= Peschanoye (Barnaulka basin) =

Salt lake in Altai Krai, Russia

- Песчаное
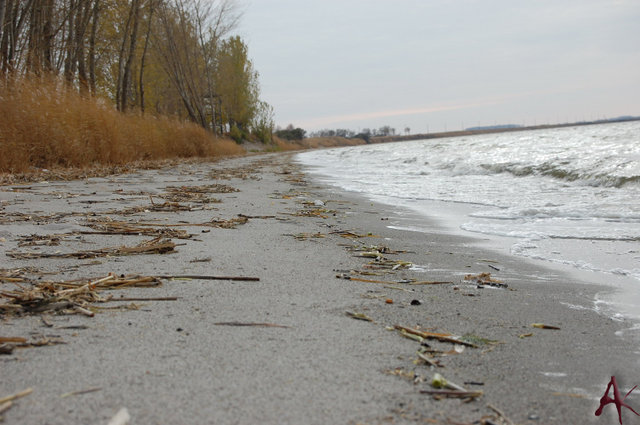
- Ribbon forest by the lakeshore

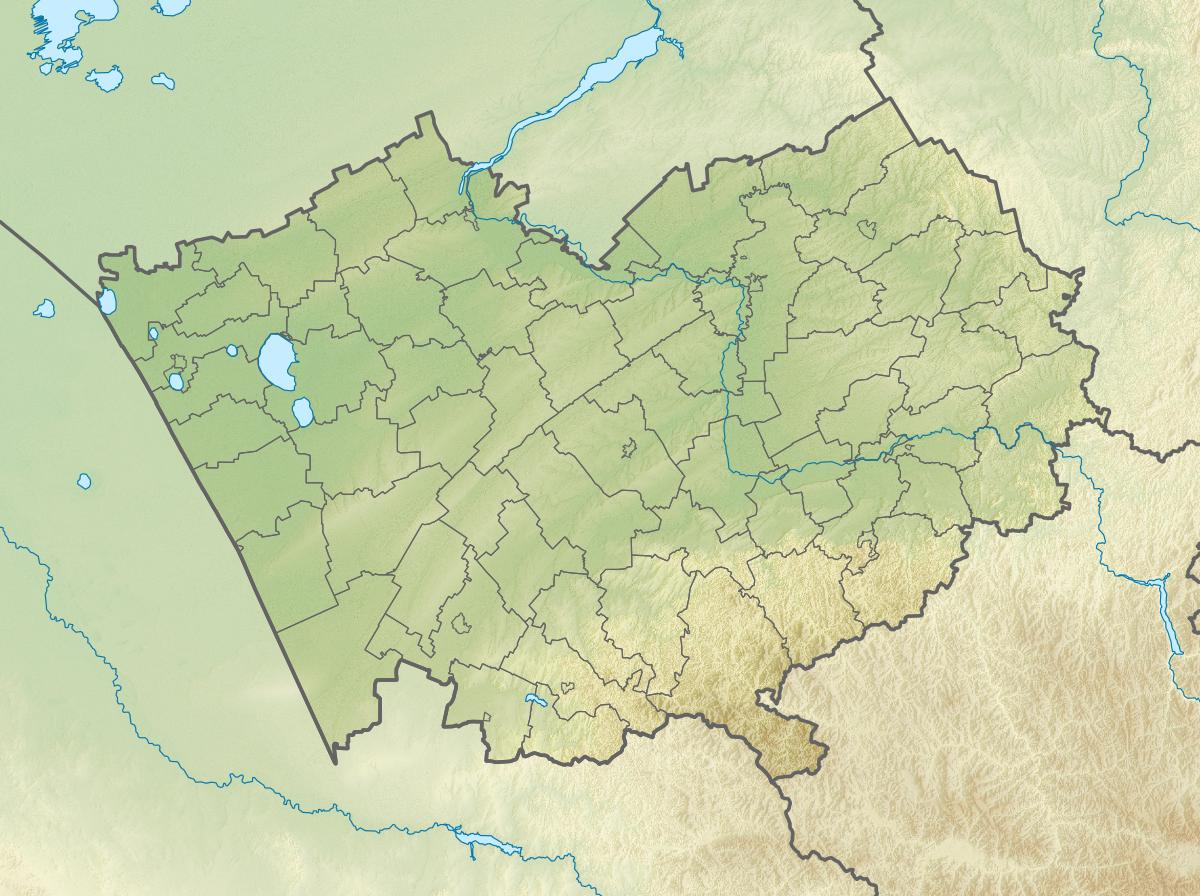
- Location within Altai Krai Location within Russia
- Location: Ob Plateau; West Siberian Plain
- Coordinates: 52°47′15″N 82°26′59″E
- Type: exorheic
- Primary outflows: Barnaulka
- Catchment area: 3,130 square kilometers (1,210 sq mi)
- Basin countries: Russia
- Max. length: 6.9 kilometers (4.3 mi)
- Max. width: 1.6 kilometers (0.99 mi)
- Surface area: 6.1 square kilometers (2.4 sq mi)
- Residence time: UTC+7
- Surface elevation: 216 meters (709 ft)
- Settlements: Peschanoye

Peschanoye (Russian: Песчаное) is a salt lake in Topchikhinsky District, Altai Krai, Russian Federation.

The lake lies roughly in the middle of the Krai. The nearest town is Peschanoye located near the northeastern lakeshore. Topchikha, the district capital, lies 47 kilometers (29 mi) to the east, and Barnaul, the capital of the Krai, 145 kilometers (90 mi) to the northeast. The lake is a tourist attraction.

== Geography ==
Peschanoye is in the area of the sources of the Barnaulka river. It lies in one of the wide ravines of glacial origin that cut diagonally across the Ob Plateau slanting towards the Ob River. The lake has an elongated shape, stretching roughly from northeast to southwest for almost 7 kilometers (4.3 mi). It is connected by a channel with neighboring lake Serebrennikovskoye to the southwest. The shores are flat and the northern section of the lake is broader than the southern one.

There are a number of lakes in the same trench. Lakes Bakhmatovskoye and Sredneye are located 8 kilometers (5.0 mi) to the southwest and Zerkalnoye 12 kilometers (7.5 mi) further away in the same direction.

== Flora and fauna ==
The ribbon pine forest characteristic of the Ob Plateau grows close to the lake.

== See also ==
- List of lakes of Russia
