= Melnikovo =

Melnikovo (Russian: Мельниково) is the name of several rural localities in Russia:

- Melnikovo, Altai Krai, a selo in Melnikovsky Selsoviet of Novichikhinsky District of Altai Krai
- Melnikovo, Chelyabinsk Oblast, a village in Travnikovsky Selsoviet of Chebarkulsky District of Chelyabinsk Oblast
- Melnikovo, Ivanovo Oblast, a village in Rodnikovsky District of Ivanovo Oblast
- Melnikovo, Kaliningrad Oblast, a settlement in Kovrovsky Rural Okrug of Zelenogradsky District of Kaliningrad Oblast
- Melnikovo, Pizhansky District, Kirov Oblast, a village under the administrative jurisdiction of the urban-type settlement of Pizhanka in Pizhansky District of Kirov Oblast
- Melnikovo, Sanchursky District, Kirov Oblast, a village in Smetaninsky Rural Okrug of Sanchursky District of Kirov Oblast
- Melnikovo, Buysky District, Kostroma Oblast, a village in Tsentralnoye Settlement of Buysky District of Kostroma Oblast
- Melnikovo, Nerekhtsky District, Kostroma Oblast, a village in Yemsnenskoye Settlement of Nerekhtsky District of Kostroma Oblast
- Melnikovo, Leningrad Oblast, a logging depot settlement in Melnikovskoye Settlement Municipal Formation of Priozersky District of Leningrad Oblast
- Melnikovo, Moscow Oblast, a village in Ateptsevskoye Rural Settlement of Naro-Fominsky District of Moscow Oblast
- Melnikovo, Gorodetsky District, Nizhny Novgorod Oblast, a village in Zinyakovsky Selsoviet of Gorodetsky District of Nizhny Novgorod Oblast
- Melnikovo, Sharangsky District, Nizhny Novgorod Oblast, a village in Rozhentsovsky Selsoviet of Sharangsky District of Nizhny Novgorod Oblast
- Melnikovo, Smolensk Oblast, a village in Vysokovskoye Rural Settlement of Novoduginsky District of Smolensk Oblast
- Melnikovo, Tomsk Oblast, a selo in Shegarsky District of Tomsk Oblast
- Melnikovo, Tver Oblast, a village in Chernogubovskoye Rural Settlement of Kalininsky District of Tver Oblast
- Melnikovo, Udmurt Republic, a village in Melnikovsky Selsoviet of Mozhginsky District of the Udmurt Republic
- Melnikovo, Vologda Oblast, a village in Podlesny Selsoviet of Vologodsky District of Vologda Oblast
- Melnikovo, Yaroslavl Oblast, a village in Rodionovsky Rural Okrug of Nekouzsky District of Yaroslavl Oblast
