= Urlapovo =

Urlapovo Урлапово
- Village
- Location within Altai Krai Location within Russia
- Coordinates: 52°34′N 82°00′E
- Country: Russia
- Region: Altai Krai
- District: Shipunovsky District
- Time zone: UTC+7:00

Urlapovo (Russian: Урлапово) is a rural locality (a selo) and the administrative center of Urlapovsky Selsoviet of Shipunovsky District, Altai Krai, Russia. The population was 840 in 2016. There are 5 streets.

== Geography ==
Urlapovo is located on the Ob Plateau near lakes Zerkalnoye and Sredneye, 48 km north of Shipunovo (the district's administrative centre) by road. Travnoye is the nearest rural locality.
