= Travnoye =

Travnoye Травное
- Selo
- Location within Altai Krai Location within Russia
- Coordinates: 52°35′N 81°52′E
- Country: Russia
- Region: Altai Krai
- District: Mamontovsky District
- Time zone: UTC+7:00

Travnoye (Russian: Травное) is a rural locality (a selo) in Mamontovsky District, Altai Krai, Russia. The population was 403 as of 2013. There are 4 streets.

== Geography ==
Travnoye is located on the Ob Plateau near lakes Zerkalnoye and Sredneye, 26 km southeast of Mamontovo (the district's administrative centre) by road. Urlapovo is the nearest rural locality.
