= Beryozovsky, Aleysky District, Altai Krai =

Beryozovsky Берёзовский
- Settlement
- Location within Altai Krai Location within Russia
- Coordinates: 52°33′N 82°18′E
- Country: Russia
- Region: Altai Krai
- District: Aleysky District
- Time zone: UTC+7:00

Beryozovsky (Russian: Берёзовский) is a rural locality (a settlement) in Druzhbinsky Selsoviet, Aleysky District, Altai Krai, Russia. The population was 2 as of 2012. There are 2 streets.

== Geography ==
Beryozovsky is located 40 km WNW of Aleysk (the district's administrative centre) by road. Druzhba and Mokhovskoye are the nearest rural localities.
