= Novokolpakovo =

Novokolpakovo Новоколпаково
- Selo
- Location within Altai Krai Location within Russia
- Coordinates: 52°33′N 82°58′E
- Country: Russia
- Region: Altai Krai
- District: Aleysky District
- Time zone: UTC+7:00

Novokolpakovo (Russian: Новоколпаково) is a rural locality (a selo) in Bolshepanyushevsky Selsoviet, Aleysky District, Altai Krai, Russia. The population was 91 as of 2013. There are 8 streets.

== Geography ==
Novokolpakovo is located on the Aley River, 19 km northeast of Aleysk (the district's administrative centre) by road. Bezgolosovo and Bolshepanyushevo are the nearest rural localities.
