= Sredneye (lake, Altai Krai) =

Salt lake in Altai Krai, Russia

- Среднее
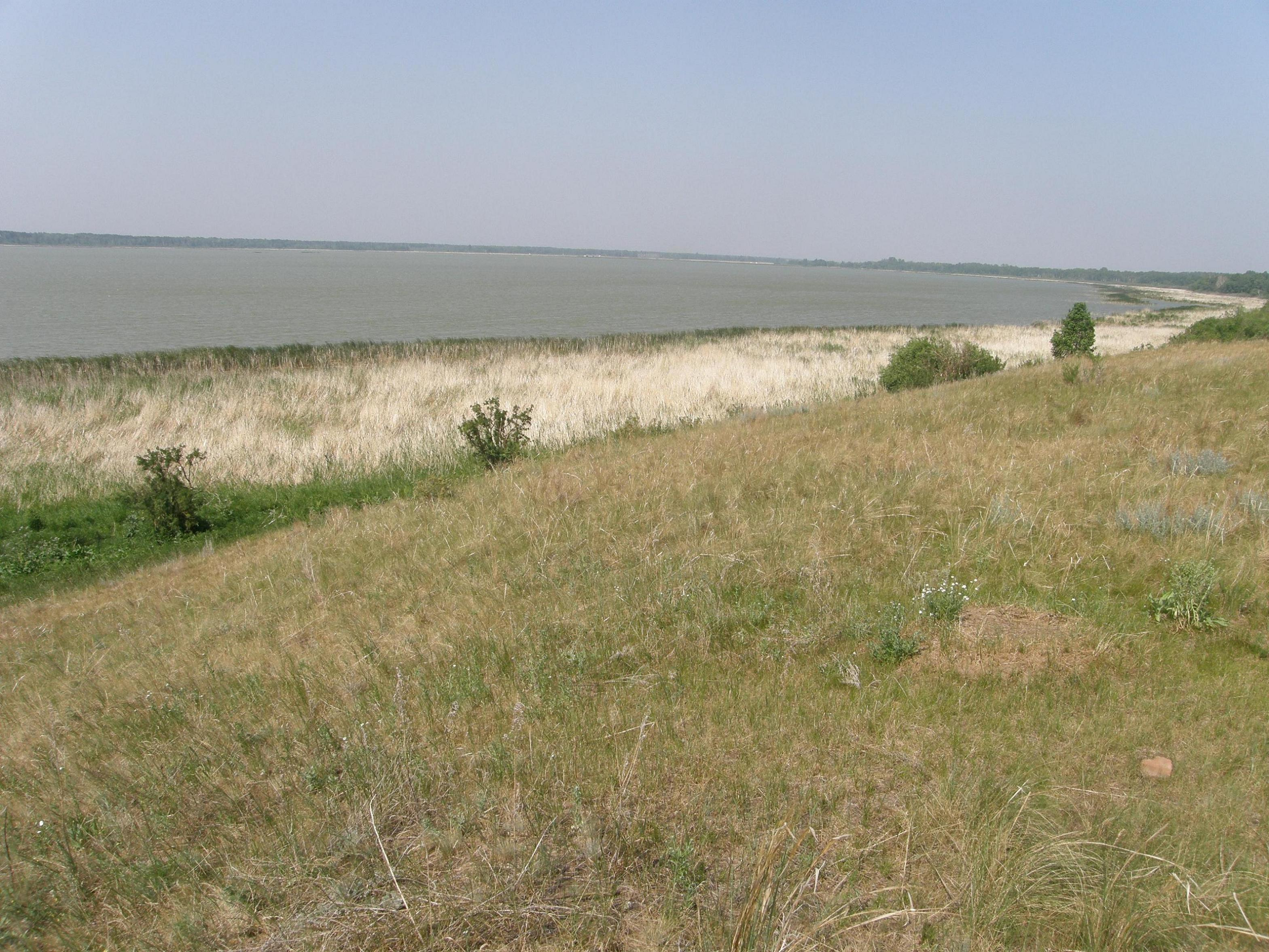
- Panorama of the lakeshore

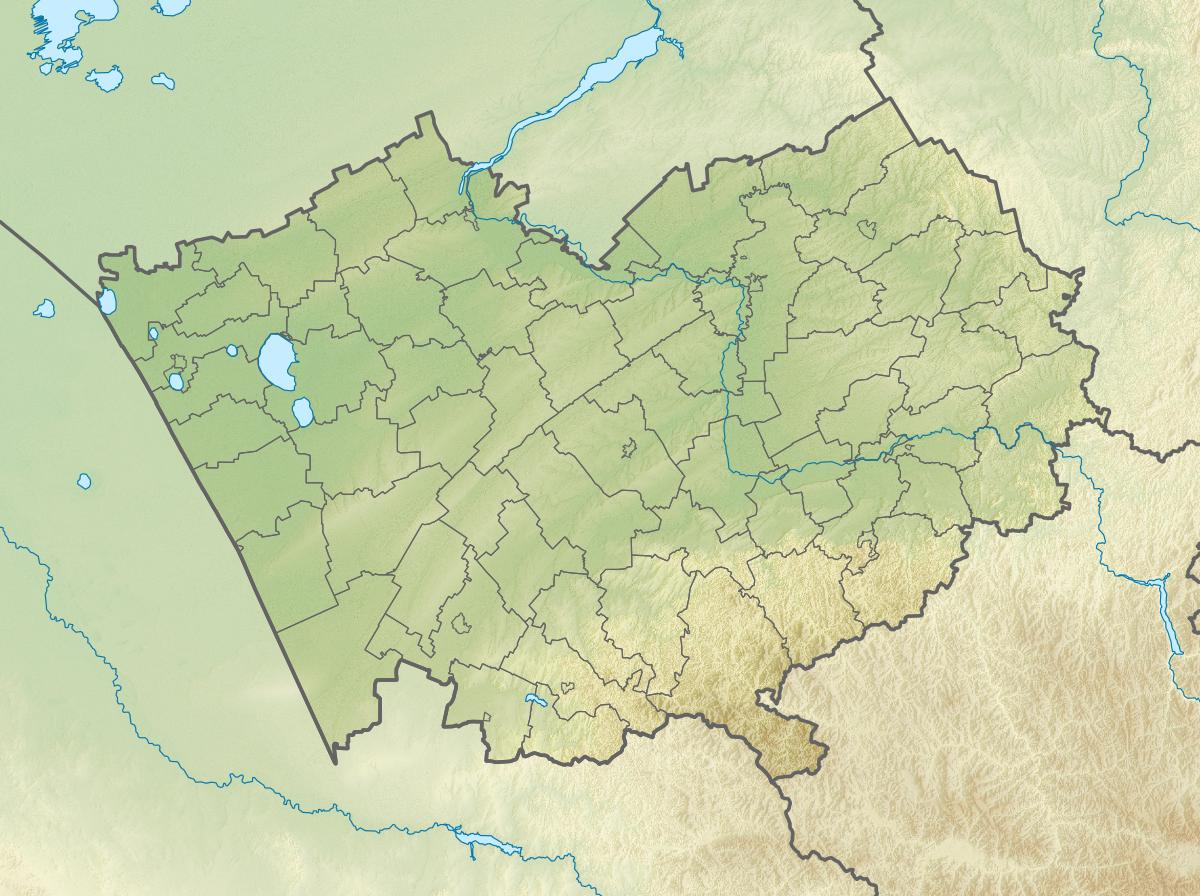
- Location within Altai Krai Location within Russia
- Location: Ob Plateau; West Siberian Plain
- Coordinates: 52°37′50″N 82°06′19″E
- Type: exorheic
- Primary outflows: Barnaulka
- Catchment area: 961 square kilometers (371 sq mi)
- Basin countries: Russia
- Max. length: 6.8 kilometers (4.2 mi)
- Max. width: 1.6 kilometers (0.99 mi)
- Surface area: 7.07 square kilometers (2.73 sq mi)
- Average depth: 1.5 meters (4 ft 11 in)
- Max. depth: 1.7 meters (5 ft 7 in)
- Residence time: UTC+6
- Shore length^{1}: 13 kilometers (8.1 mi)
- Surface elevation: 218.2 meters (716 ft)
- ^{1} Shore length is not a well-defined measure.

Sredneye (Russian: Среднее) is a salt lake in Aleysky District, Altai Krai, Russian Federation.

The lake lies roughly in the middle of the Krai. The nearest towns are Urlapovo and Borovskoye near the eastern lakeshore. Aleysk, the district capital, lies 43 kilometers (27 mi) to the southeast.

== Geography ==
Sredneye is in the area of the sources of the Barnaulka river. It lies in one of the wide ravines of glacial origin that cut diagonally across the Ob Plateau slanting towards the Ob River. The lake has an elongated shape, stretching roughly from northeast to southwest for over 6 kilometers (3.7 mi). It is connected by a channel with Bakhmatovskoye lake to the northeast. The lake is shallow and the bottom is flat and mostly silty.

Lake Zerkalnoye is located in the same trench 9 kilometers (5.6 mi) to the southwest and Gorkoye 43 kilometers (27 mi) further away in the same direction.

== Flora and fauna ==
The ribbon pine forest characteristic of the Ob Plateau grows in places close to the lake. Reeds and cattails are found in sections of the lakeshore.

== See also ==
- List of lakes of Russia
