= Bakhmatovskoye =

Salt lake in Altai Krai, Russia

- Бахматовское
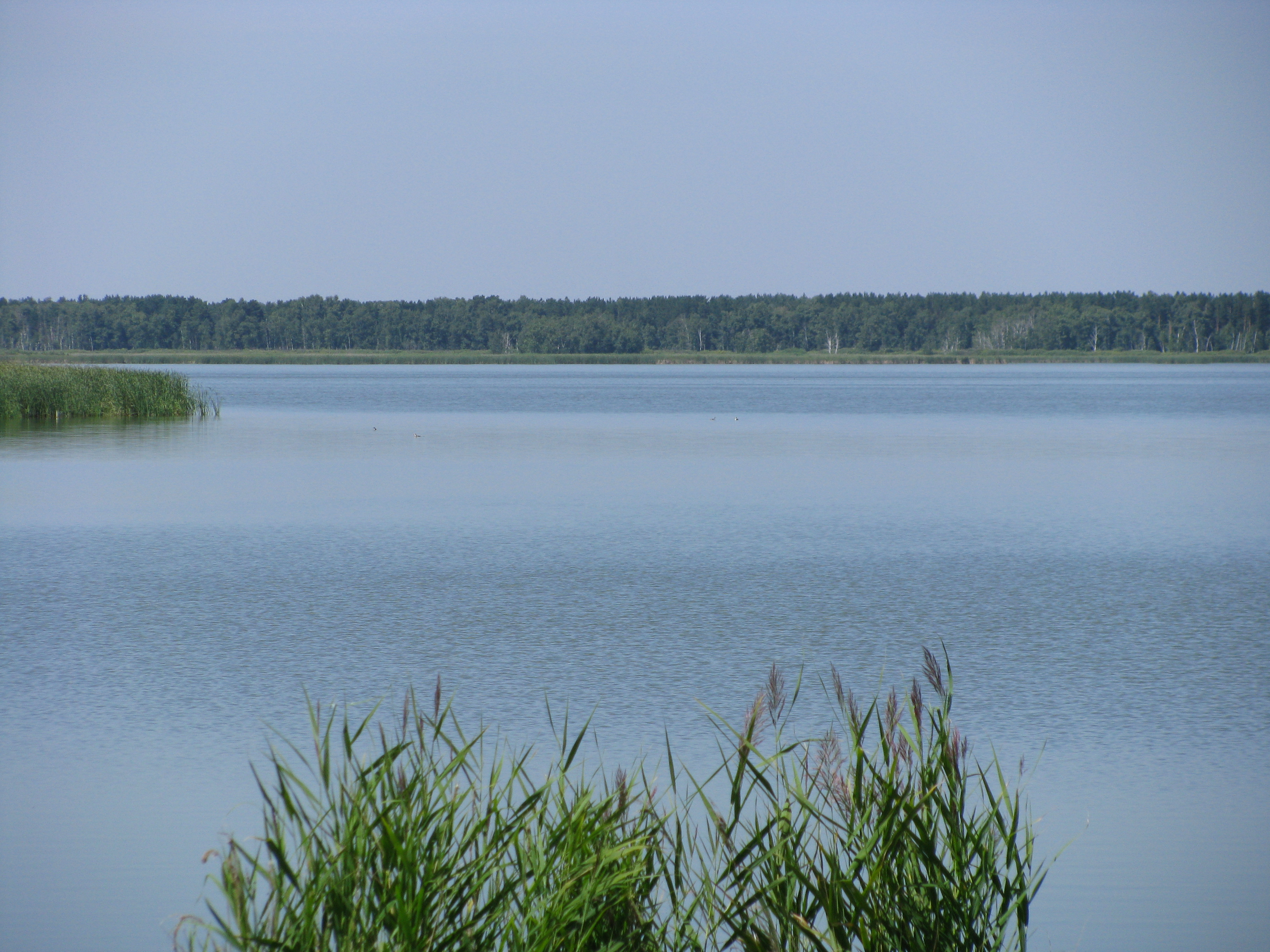
- Panoramic view of the lake.

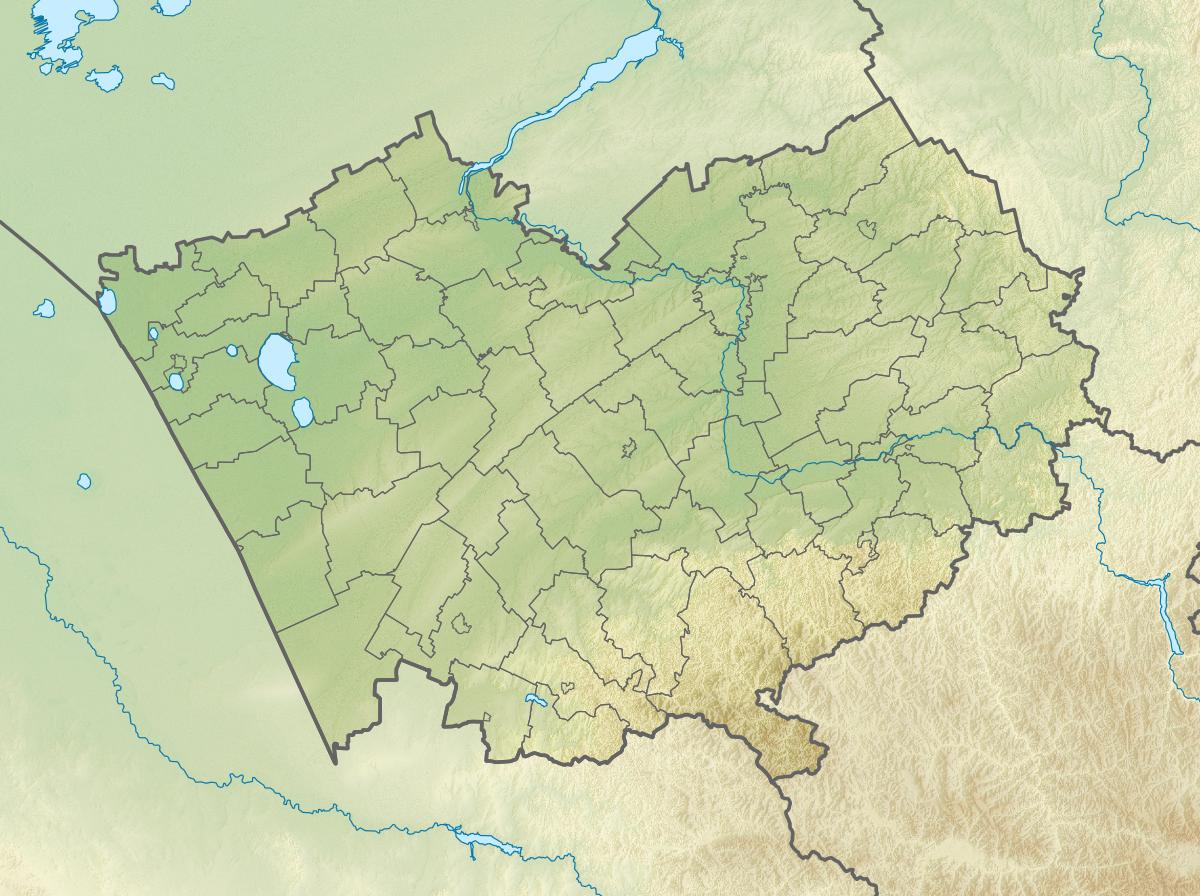
- Location within Altai Krai Location within Russia
- Location: Ob Plateau; West Siberian Plain
- Coordinates: 52°41′11″N 82°13′23″E
- Type: exorheic
- Primary outflows: Barnaulka
- Catchment area: 3,010 square kilometers (1,160 sq mi)
- Basin countries: Russia
- Max. length: 14.2 kilometers (8.8 mi)
- Max. width: 2.4 kilometers (1.5 mi)
- Surface area: 19.6 square kilometers (7.6 sq mi)
- Average depth: 1.9 meters (6 ft 3 in)
- Residence time: UTC+6
- Shore length^{1}: 13 kilometers (8.1 mi)
- Surface elevation: 217.9 meters (715 ft)
- Islands: Yes
- Settlements: Borovskoye
- ^{1} Shore length is not a well-defined measure.

Bakhmatovskoye (Russian: Бахматовское) is a salt lake in Aleysky District, Altai Krai, Russian Federation.

The lake lies roughly in the middle of the Krai. The nearest towns are Voronikha to the north and Borovskoye, formerly known as Bakhmatovo, located near the southern lakeshore. Aleysk, the district capital, lies 42 kilometers (26 mi) to the southeast.

== Geography ==
Bakhmatovskoye is in the area of the sources of the Barnaulka river. It lies in one of the wide ravines of glacial origin that cut diagonally across the Ob Plateau slanting towards the Ob River. The lake has an elongated shape, stretching roughly from northeast to southwest for over 14 kilometers (8.7 mi). It is connected by a channel with neighboring lake Sredneye to the southwest and with lake Serebrennikovskoye to the northeast. The shores are flat and often deeply indented, forming bays and peninsulas. There are also a few islands in the central section. The bottom of the lake is sandy and silty with a predominance of gray silt.

There are a number of lakes in the same trench. Lake Sredneye is located 0.9 kilometers (0.56 mi) to the southwest and Zerkalnoye 18 kilometers (11 mi) further away in the same direction. Lake Peschanoye lies 8 kilometers (5.0 mi) to the northeast.

== Flora and fauna ==
The ribbon pine forest characteristic of the Ob Plateau grows close to the lake. Reeds, bulrush and cattails are found in sections of the lakeshore. The main fish species is the crucian carp, but gudgeon and Eurasian minnow are also found. The latter are more sensitive to increases in salinity and sometimes mass-death occurs.

== See also ==
- List of lakes of Russia
