= Zerkaly =

Zerkaly Зеркалы
- Selo
- Location within Altai Krai Location within Russia
- Coordinates: 52°29′N 81°50′E
- Country: Russia
- Region: Altai Krai
- District: Shipunovsky District
- Time zone: UTC+7:00

Zerkaly (Russian: Зеркалы) is a rural locality (a selo) and the administrative center of Zerkalsky Selsoviet, Shipunovsky District, Altai Krai, Russia. The population was 659 as of 2013. There are 10 streets.

== Geography ==
Zerkaly is located on the Zerkalnoye lake, 45 km northwest of Shipunovo (the district's administrative centre) by road. Andreyevka is the nearest rural locality.
