= Rebrikha =

Rebrikha (Russian: Ребриха) is the name of two rural localities in Rebrikhinsky District of Altai Krai, Russia:

- Rebrikha, Rebrikhinsky Selsoviet, Rebrikhinsky District, Altai Krai, a selo in Rebrikhinsky Selsoviet
- Rebrikha, Stantsionno-Rebrikhinsky Selsoviet, Rebrikhinsky District, Altai Krai, a station in Stantsionno-Rebrikhinsky Selsoviet
