= Artamanovo =

Artamanovo Артамоново
- Settlement
- Location within Altai Krai Location within Russia
- Coordinates: 52°17′N 81°51′E
- Country: Russia
- Region: Altai Krai
- District: Shipunovsky District
- Time zone: UTC+7:00

Artamanovo (Russian: Артамоново) is a rural locality (a settlement) in Porozhnensky Selsoviet, Shipunovsky District, Altai Krai, Russia. The population was 122 as of 2013. There are 2 streets.

== Geography ==
Artamanovo is located 41 km WNW of Shipunovo (the district's administrative centre) by road. Porozhneye is the nearest rural locality.
