= Bezgolosovo =

Bezgolosovo Безголосово
- Selo
- Location within Altai Krai Location within Russia
- Coordinates: 52°31′N 82°57′E
- Country: Russia
- Region: Altai Krai
- District: Aleysky District
- Time zone: UTC+7:00

Bezgolosovo (Russian: Безголосово) is a rural locality (a selo) and the administrative center of Bezgolosovsky Selsoviet, Aleysky District, Altai Krai, Russia. The population was 598 as of 2013. There are 13 streets.

== Geography ==
Bezgolosovo is located on the Aley River, 15 km east of Aleysk (the district's administrative centre) by road. Bolshepanyushevo and Uspenovka are the nearest rural localities.
