= Korobeynikovo, Shipunovsky District, Altai Krai =

Korobeynikovo Коробейниково
- Selo
- Location within Altai Krai Location within Russia
- Coordinates: 52°24′N 81°41′E
- Country: Russia
- Region: Altai Krai
- District: Shipunovsky District
- Time zone: UTC+7:00

Korobeynikovo (Russian: Коробейниково) is a rural locality (a selo) in Zerkalsky Selsoviet, Shipunovsky District, Altai Krai, Russia. The population was 267 as of 2013. It was founded in 1785. There are 9 streets.

== Geography ==
Korobeynikovo is located 58 km northwest of Shipunovo (the district's administrative centre) by road. Andreyevka is the nearest rural locality.
