= Uryupino =

Uryupino Урюпино
- Selo
- Location within Altai Krai Location within Russia
- Coordinates: 52°25′N 82°40′E
- Country: Russia
- Region: Altai Krai
- District: Aleysky District
- Time zone: UTC+7:00

Uryupino (Russian: Урюпино) is a rural locality (a selo) and the administrative center of Uryupinsky Selsoviet, Aleysky District, Altai Krai, Russia. The population was 628 as of 2013. There are 13 streets.

== Geography ==
Uryupino is located 18 km southwest of Aleysk (the district's administrative centre) by road. Malakhovo is the nearest rural locality.
