= Gorkovskoye, Altai Krai =

Gorkovskoye Горьковское
- Selo
- Location within Altai Krai Location within Russia
- Coordinates: 52°04′N 82°08′E
- Country: Russia
- Region: Altai Krai
- District: Shipunovsky District
- Time zone: UTC+7:00

Gorkovskoye (Russian: Горьковское) is a rural locality (a selo) and the administrative center of Gorkovsky Selsoviet, Shipunovsky District, Altai Krai, Russia. The population was 1,150 as of 2013. There are 14 streets.

== Geography ==
Gorkovskoye is located by the Aley river, 23 km southwest of Shipunovo (the district's administrative centre) by road. Mirny is the nearest rural locality.
