= Chupino =

Chupino Чупино
- Settlement
- Location within Altai Krai Location within Russia
- Coordinates: 52°07′N 82°47′E
- Country: Russia
- Region: Altai Krai
- District: Shipunovsky District
- Time zone: UTC+7:00

Chupino (Russian: Чупино) is a rural locality (a settlement) in Voykovsky Selsoviet, Shipunovsky District, Altai Krai, Russia. The population was 11 as of 2013. There is 1 street.

== Geography ==
Chupino is located 48 km ESE of Shipunovo (the district's administrative centre) by road. Ust-Porozikha is the nearest rural locality.
