= Serebrennikovo =

Serebrennikovo Серебренниково
- Selo
- Location within Altai Krai Location within Russia
- Coordinates: 52°43′N 82°20′E
- Country: Russia
- Region: Altai Krai
- District: Aleysky District
- Time zone: UTC+7:00

Serebrennikovo (Russian: Серебренниково) is a rural locality (a selo) in Borovsky Selsoviet, Aleysky District, Altai Krai, Russia. The population was 52 as of 2013. There are 3 streets.

== Geography ==
Serebrennikovo is located on the Serebrennikovskoye Lake, 62 km northwest of Aleysk (the district's administrative centre) by road. Voronikha is the nearest rural locality.
