= Meteli, Altai Krai =

Meteli Метели
- Settlement
- Location within Altai Krai Location within Russia
- Coordinates: 52°04′N 82°28′E
- Country: Russia
- Region: Altai Krai
- District: Shipunovsky District
- Time zone: UTC+7:00

Meteli (Russian: Метели) is a rural locality (a settlement) in Beloglazovsky Selsoviet, Shipunovsky District, Altai Krai, Russia. The population was 294 as of 2013, with 4 streets.

== Geography ==
Meteli is located 28 km southeast of Shipunovo (the district's administrative centre) by road. Bestuzhevo is the nearest rural locality.
