= Kalinovka, Shipunovsky District, Altai Krai =

Kalinovka Калиновка
- Settlement
- Location within Altai Krai Location within Russia
- Coordinates: 52°07′N 82°09′E
- Country: Russia
- Region: Altai Krai
- District: Shipunovsky District
- Time zone: UTC+7:00

Kalinovka (Russian: Калиновка) is a rural locality (a settlement) in Rossiysky Selsoviet, Shipunovsky District, Altai Krai, Russia. The population was 190 as of 2013. There are 3 streets.

== Geography ==
Kalinovka is located 15 km southwest of Shipunovo (the district's administrative centre) by road. Bykovo is the nearest rural locality.
