= Kabakovo, Altai Krai =

Kabakovo Кабаково
- Selo
- Location within Altai Krai Location within Russia
- Coordinates: 52°18′30″N 82°29′31″E
- Country: Russia
- Region: Altai Krai
- District: Aleysky District
- Time zone: UTC+7:00

Kabakovo (Russian: Кабаково) is a rural locality (a selo) in Aleysky District, Altai Krai, Russia. The population was 579 as of 2013. There are 14 streets.

== Geography ==
Kabakovo is located 38 km southwest of Aleysk (the district's administrative centre) by road. Kashino is the nearest rural locality.
