= Vetyolki =

Vetyolki Ветёлки
- Selo
- Location within Altai Krai Location within Russia
- Coordinates: 52°13′N 82°53′E
- Country: Russia
- Region: Altai Krai
- District: Aleysky District
- Time zone: UTC+7:00

Vetyolki (Russian: Ветёлки) is a rural locality (a selo) in Sovkhozny Selsoviet, Aleysky District, Altai Krai, Russia. The population was 286 as of 2013. There are 6 streets.

== Geography ==
Vetyolki is located on the Plotavka River, 38 km SSE of Aleysk (the district's administrative centre) by road. Ust-Porozikha is the nearest rural locality.
