= Aleysky =

Aleysky (masculine), Aleyskaya (feminine), or Aleyskoye (neuter) may refer to:

- Aleysky District, a district of Altai Krai, Russia
- Aleysky (rural locality), a rural locality (a settlement) in Altai Krai, Russia
