= Solonovka, Novichikhinsky District, Altai Krai =

Solonovka Солоновка
- Selo
- Location within Altai Krai Location within Russia
- Coordinates: 51°59′N 81°23′E
- Country: Russia
- Region: Altai Krai
- District: Novichikhinsky District
- Time zone: UTC+7:00

Solonovka (Russian: Солоновка) is a rural locality (a selo) in Solonovsky Selsoviet, Novichikhinsky District, Altai Krai, Russia. The population was 776 as of 2013. There are 9 streets.

== Geography ==
Solonovka is located on the Priobskoye plato, 42 km south of Novichikha (the district's administrative centre) by road. 10 let Oktyabrya is the nearest rural locality.
