= Zimino =

Zimino Зимино
- Selo
- Location within Altai Krai Location within Russia
- Coordinates: 52°57′N 82°42′E
- Country: Russia
- Region: Altai Krai
- District: Rebrikhinsky District
- Time zone: UTC+7:00

Zimino (Russian: Зимино) is a rural locality (a selo) and the administrative center of Ziminsky Selsoviet, Rebrikhinsky District, Altai Krai, Russia. The population was 997 as of 2013. There are 11 streets.

== Geography ==
Zimino is located 32 km southeast of Rebrikha (the district's administrative centre) by road. Ploskoseminsky is the nearest rural locality.
