= Ploskoseminsky =

Ploskoseminsky Плоскосеминский
- Settlement
- Location within Altai Krai Location within Russia
- Coordinates: 52°59′N 82°29′E
- Country: Russia
- Region: Altai Krai
- District: Rebrikhinsky District
- Time zone: UTC+7:00

Ploskoseminsky (Russian: Плоскосеминский) is a rural locality (a settlement) and the administrative center of Ploskoseminsky Selsoviet, Rebrikhinsky District, Altai Krai, Russia. The population was 359 as of 2013. There are 4 streets.

== Geography ==
Ploskoseminsky is located 18 km southeast of Rebrikha (the district's administrative centre) by road. Dalny is the nearest rural locality.
