= Borovskoye, Altai Krai =

Borovskoye Боровское
- Selo
- Location within Altai Krai Location within Russia
- Coordinates: 52°38′N 82°10′E
- Country: Russia
- Region: Altai Krai
- District: Aleysky District
- Time zone: UTC+7:00

Borovskoye (Russian: Боровское) is a rural locality (a selo) and the administrative center of Borovsky Selsoviet, Aleysky District, Altai Krai, Russia. The population was 992 as of 2013. There are 17 streets.

== Geography ==
Borovskoye is located by lake Bakhmatovskoye, near lake Sredneye, 50 km northwest of Aleysk (the district's administrative centre) by road. Kostin Log is the nearest rural locality.
