= Vavilon, Altai Krai =

Vavilon Вавилон
- Selo
- Location within Altai Krai Location within Russia
- Coordinates: 52°28′N 82°50′E
- Country: Russia
- Region: Altai Krai
- District: Aleysky District
- Time zone: UTC+7:00

Vavilon (Russian: Вавилон) is a rural locality (a selo) and the administrative center of Fruzensky Selsoviet, Aleysky District, Altai Krai, Russia. The population was 561 as of 2013. There are five streets.

== Geography ==
Vavilon is located on the Aley River, 12 km southeast of Aleysk (the district's administrative centre) by road. Zelyonaya Polyana is the nearest rural locality.
