= Podstepnoye =

Podstepnoye Подстепное
- Selo
- Location within Altai Krai Location within Russia
- Coordinates: 52°57′N 82°05′E
- Country: Russia
- Region: Altai Krai
- District: Rebrikhinsky District
- Time zone: UTC+7:00

Podstepnoye (Russian: Подстепное) is a rural locality (a selo) and the administrative center of Podstepnovsky Selsoviet, Rebrikhinsky District, Altai Krai, Russia. The population was 919 as of 2013. There are 19 streets.

== Geography ==
Podstepnoye is located 23 km southwest of Rebrikha (the district's administrative centre) by road. Panovo is the nearest rural locality.
