= Plotava =

Plotava Плотава
- Selo
- Location within Altai Krai Location within Russia
- Coordinates: 52°17′N 82°46′E
- Country: Russia
- Region: Altai Krai
- District: Aleysky District
- Time zone: UTC+7:00

Plotava (Russian: Плотава) is a rural locality (a selo) and the administrative center of Plotavsky Selsoviet, Aleysky District, Altai Krai, Russia. The population was 469 as of 2013. There are 14 streets.

== Geography ==
Plotava is located on the Plotavka River, 29 km south of Aleysk (the district's administrative centre) by road. Sovkhozny is the nearest rural locality.
