= Krasny Yar, Aleysky District, Altai Krai =

Krasny Yar Красный Яр
- Selo
- Location within Altai Krai Location within Russia
- Coordinates: 52°23′N 82°37′E
- Country: Russia
- Region: Altai Krai
- District: Aleysky District
- Time zone: UTC+7:00

Krasny Yar (Russian: Красный Яр) is a rural locality (a selo) and the administrative center of Chapayevsky Selsoviet of Aleysky District, Altai Krai, Russia. The population was 510 as of 2016. There are 11 streets.

== Geography ==
Krasny Yar is located on the left bank of the Aley River, 22 km southeast of Aleysk (the district's administrative centre) by road. Kashino is the nearest rural locality.

== Ethnicity ==
The village is inhabited by Russians and others.
