= Shumilikha =

Shumilikha Шумилиха
- Selo
- Location within Altai Krai Location within Russia
- Coordinates: 53°07′N 81°56′E
- Country: Russia
- Region: Altai Krai
- District: Rebrikhinsky District
- Time zone: UTC+7:00

Shumilikha (Russian: Шумилиха) is a rural locality (a selo) and the administrative center of Shumilikhinsky Selsoviet, Rebrikhinsky District, Altai Krai, Russia. The population was 540 as of 2013. There are 3 streets.

== Geography ==
Shumilikha is located 28 km west of Rebrikha (the district's administrative centre) by road. Tulay is the nearest rural locality.
