= Zelyonaya Roshcha, Rebrikhinsky District, Altai Krai =

Zelyonaya Roshcha Зелёная Роща
- Selo
- Location within Altai Krai Location within Russia
- Coordinates: 53°03′N 82°29′E
- Country: Russia
- Region: Altai Krai
- District: Rebrikhinsky District
- Time zone: UTC+7:00

Zelyonaya Roshcha (Russian: Зелёная Роща) is a rural locality (a selo) and the administrative center of Zelenoroshchinsky Selsoviet, Rebrikhinsky District, Altai Krai, Russia. The population was 536 as of 2013. There are 10 streets.

== Geography ==
Zelyonaya Roshcha is located 15 km east of Rebrikha (the district's administrative centre) by road. Klyuchevka is the nearest rural locality.
