= Savinka =

Savinka Савинка
- Village
- Location within Altai Krai Location within Russia
- Coordinates: 52°38′N 82°37′E
- Country: Russia
- Region: Altai Krai
- District: Aleysky District
- Time zone: UTC+7:00

Savinka (Russian: Савинка) is a rural locality (a selo) and the administrative center of Savinsky Selsoviet of Aleysky District, Altai Krai, Russia. The population was 418 as of 2016. There are 10 streets.

== Geography ==
Savinka is located on the left bank of the Karymka River, 36 km northwest of Aleysk (the district's administrative centre) by road. Mokhovskoye is the nearest rural locality.

== Ethnicity ==
The village is inhabited by Russians and others.
