= Shipunovsky =

Shipunovsky (masculine), Shipunovskaya (feminine), or Shipunovskoye (neuter) may refer to:

- Shipunovsky District, a district of Altai Krai, Russia
- Shipunovsky (rural locality), a rural locality (a settlement) in Novosibirsk Oblast, Russia
