= Gorkoye (Novichikhinsky District) =

Salt lake in Altai Krai, Russia

- Горькое
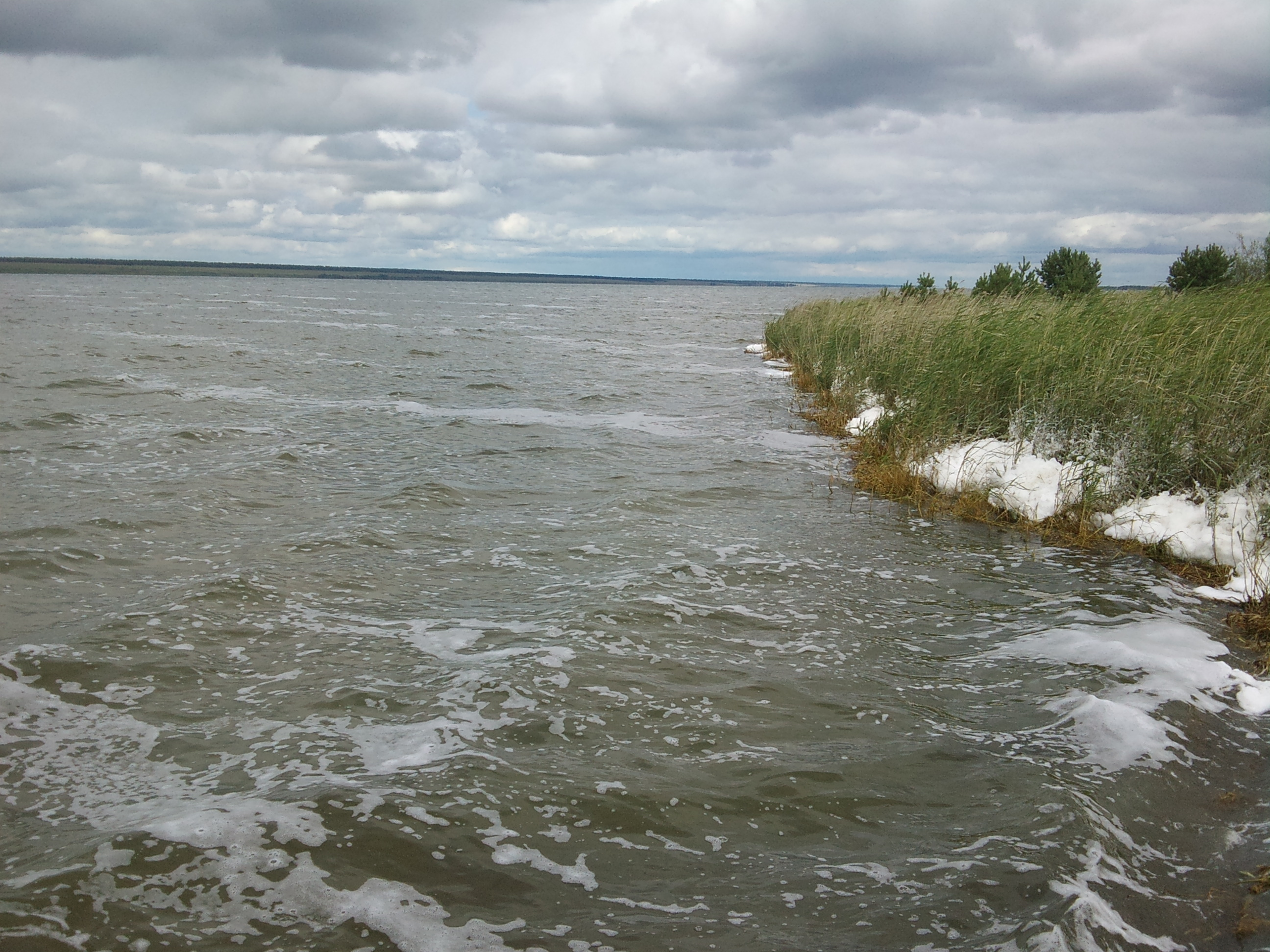
- Lakeshore view

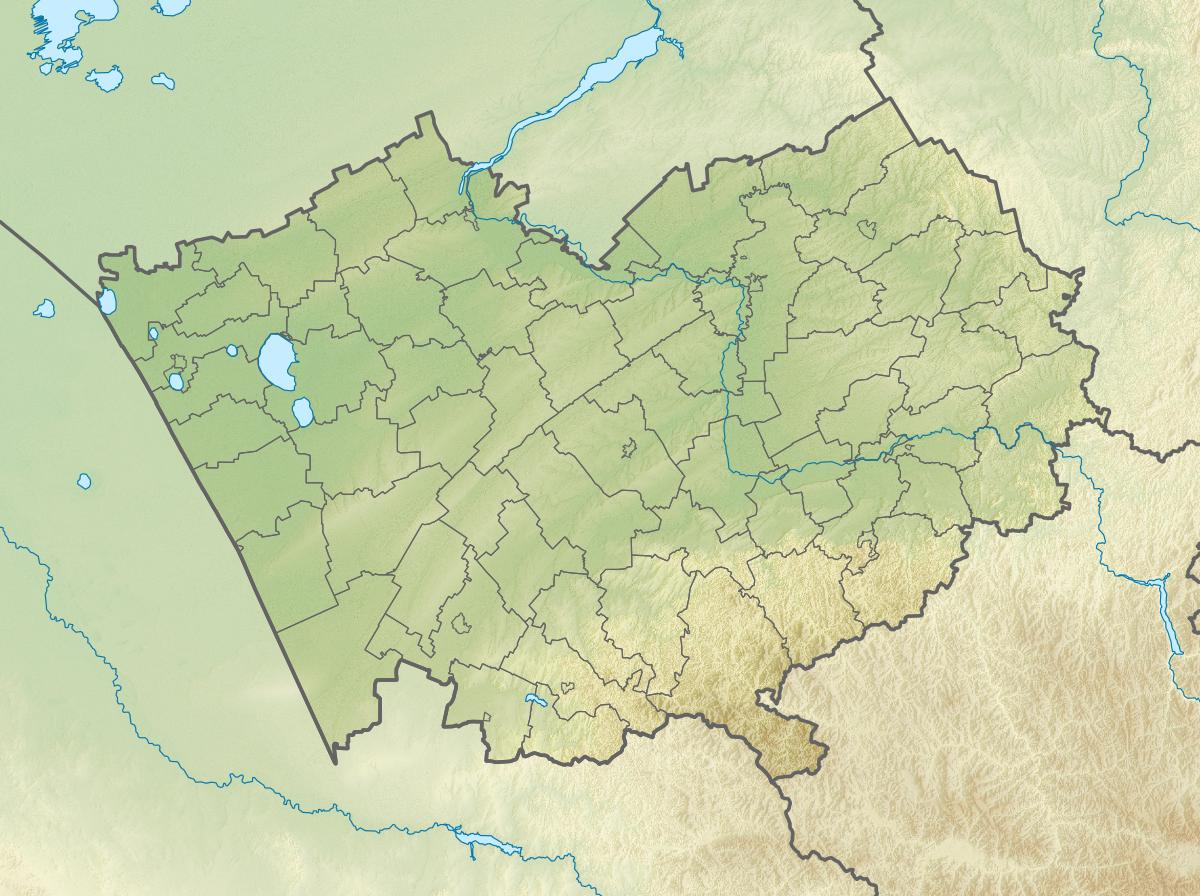
- Location within Altai Krai Location within Russia
- Location: Ob Plateau; West Siberian Plain
- Coordinates: 52°16′31″N 81°21′02″E
- Type: endorheic
- Catchment area: 961 square kilometers (371 sq mi)
- Basin countries: Russia
- Max. length: 25 kilometers (16 mi)
- Max. width: 3.8 kilometers (2.4 mi)
- Surface area: 75.1 square kilometers (29.0 sq mi)
- Average depth: 3.5 meters (11 ft)
- Max. depth: 8 meters (26 ft)
- Residence time: UTC+6
- Surface elevation: 216.3 meters (710 ft)

Gorkoye (Russian: Горькое) is a salt lake in Novichikhinsky District, Altai Krai, Russian Federation.

The lake lies roughly in the middle of the Krai. The nearest town is Melnikovo close to the southern end. Novichikha, the district capital, lies 4 kilometers (2.5 mi) to the east of the southeastern shore. The lake and its surrounding area is a tourist attraction and was declared a natural monument of regional significance in 2015.

== Geography ==
With a length of 25 kilometers (16 mi), Gorkoye is one of the longest lakes in Altai Krai. It lies in one of the wide ravines of glacial origin that cut diagonally across the Ob Plateau. The lake has an elongated shape, stretching roughly from northeast to southwest. The water is saline but was fresh in the past. The silt at the bottom of the lake is reputed to have healing properties. A ribbon forest stretches along the southeastern lakeshore.

Lake Zerkalnoye is located in the same trench 17 kilometers (11 mi) to the northeast, at the head of the Barnaulka river. Gorkoye lies 13 kilometers (8.1 mi) to the northwest, Gorkoye-Peresheyechnoye 41 kilometers (25 mi) to the southwest and pink lake Malinovoye 67 kilometers (42 mi) to the west.

== See also ==
- List of lakes of Russia
