= Voronikha (Altai Krai) =

Voronikha Ворониха
- Village
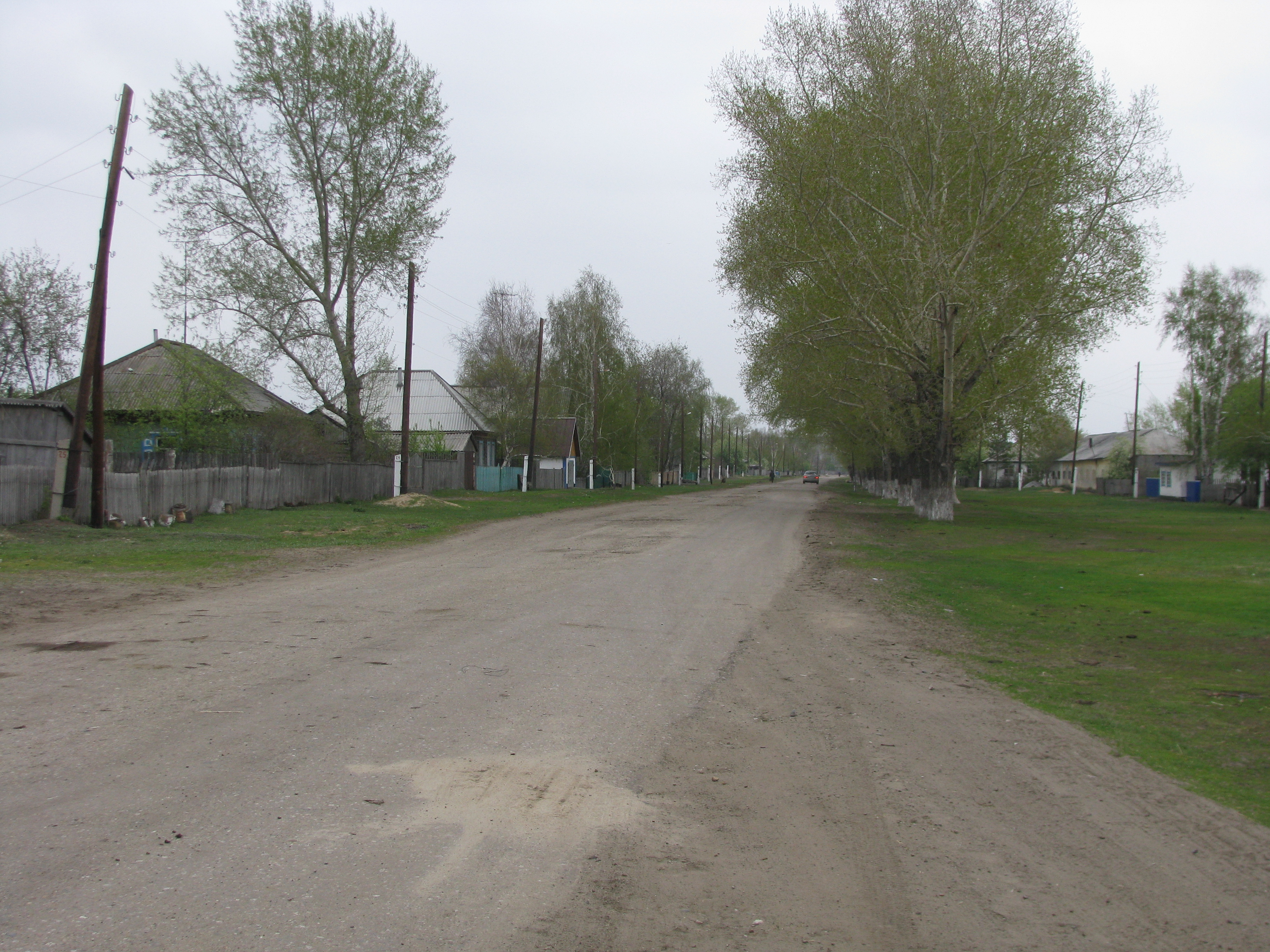
- Voronikha. Main street.

- Location within Altai Krai Location within Russia
- Coordinates: 52°45′33″N 82°13′13″E
- Country: Russia
- Region: Altai Krai
- District: Rebrikhinsky District
- Time zone: UTC+7:00

Voronikha (Russian: Ворониха) is a rural locality (a selo) and the administrative center of the Voronikhinsky Village Council, Rebrikhinsky District, Altai Krai, Russia. The population was 932 as of 2013.

== Geography ==
Voronikha is located on the Ob Plateau near lake Bakhmatovskoye. Belovo is the nearest rural locality.
