= Ust-Porozikha =

Ust-Porozikha Усть-Порозиха
- Selo
- Interactive map of Ust-Porozikha
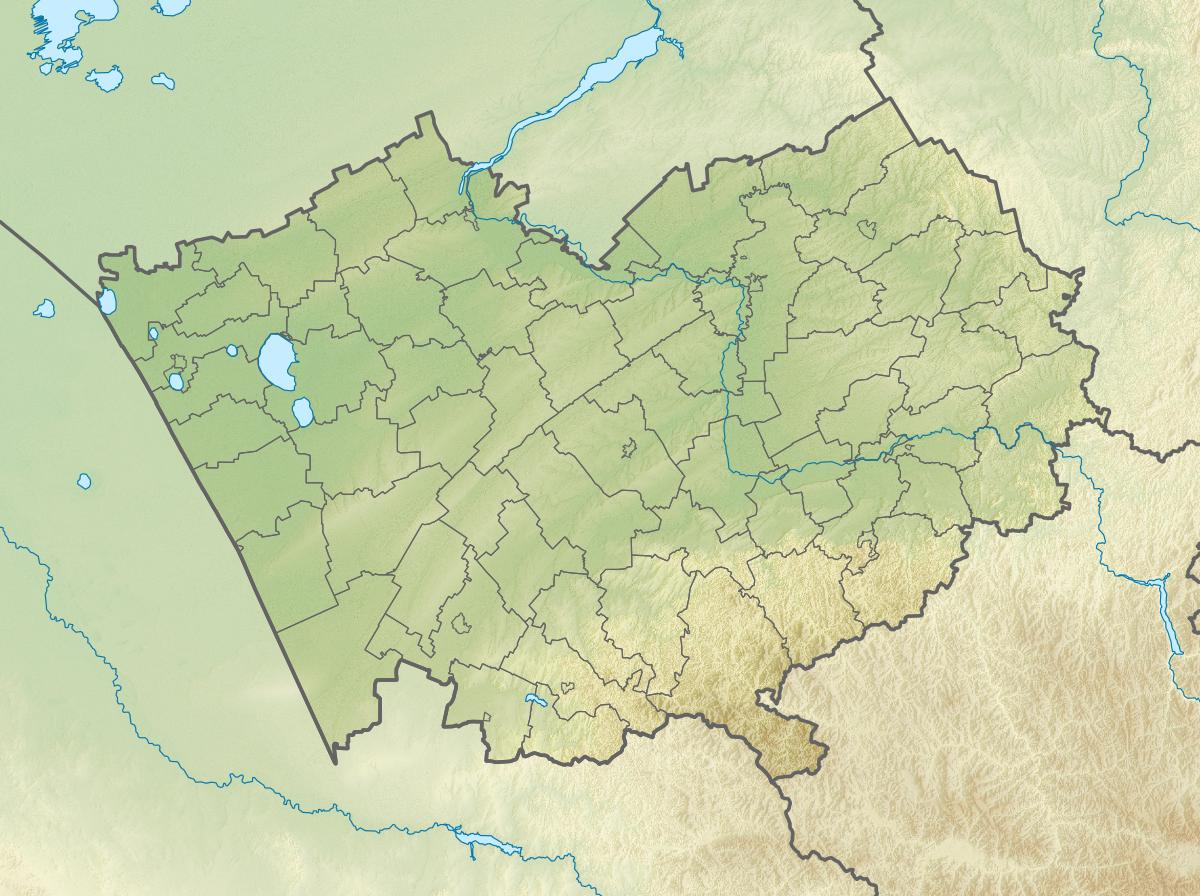
- Location within Altai Krai Location within Russia
- Coordinates: 52°07′N 82°49′E
- Country: Russia
- Region: Altai Krai
- District: Shipunovsky District
- Time zone: UTC+7:00

Ust-Porozikha (Russian: Усть-Порозиха) is a rural locality (a selo) and the administrative center of Voykovsky Selsoviet, Shipunovsky District, Altai Krai, Russia. The population was 460 as of 2013. There are 6 streets.

== Geography ==
Ust-Porozikha is located 51 km ESE of Shipunovo (the district's administrative centre) by road. Chupino is the nearest rural locality.
