= Ust-Mosikha =

Ust-Mosikha Усть-Мосиха
- Village
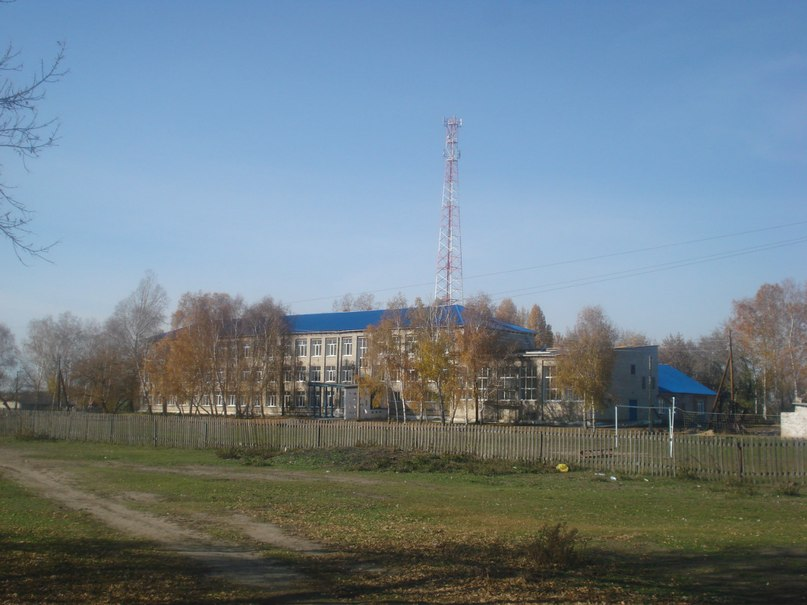
- Secondary school

- Location within Altai Krai Location within Russia
- Coordinates: 53°14′N 82°01′E
- Country: Russia
- Region: Altai Krai
- District: Rebrikhinsky District
- Time zone: UTC+7:00

Ust-Mosikha (Russian: Усть-Мосиха) is a rural locality (a selo) and the administrative center of Ust-Mosikhinsky Selsoviet, Rebrikhinsky District, Altai Krai, Russia. The population was 1,075 in 2016. There are 15 streets.

== Geography ==
Ust-Mosikha is located 31 km northwest of Rebrikha (the district's administrative centre) by road. Makarovo is the nearest rural locality.
