= Melnikovo, Altai Krai =

Melnikovo Мельниково
- Selo
- Location within Altai Krai Location within Russia
- Coordinates: 52°12′N 81°12′E
- Country: Russia
- Region: Altai Krai
- District: Novichikhinsky District
- Time zone: UTC+7:00

Melnikovo (Russian: Мельниково) is a rural locality (a selo) and the administrative center of Melnikovsky Selsoviet, Novichikhinsky District, Altai Krai, Russia. The population was 947 as of 2013. There are 10 streets.

== Geography ==
Melnikovo lies 19 kilometers (12 mi) west of Novichikha (the district's administrative centre) by road. Novichikha is the nearest rural locality. Lake Gorkoye is located by the town.
