= Alexandrovsky, Altai Krai =

Alexandrovsky Александровский
- Settlement
- Location within Altai Krai Location within Russia
- Coordinates: 52°23′N 82°55′E
- Country: Russia
- Region: Altai Krai
- District: Aleysky District
- Time zone: UTC+7:00

Alexandrovsky (Russian: Александровский) is a rural locality (a settlement) in Sovkhozny Selsoviet, Aleysky District, Altai Krai, Russia. The population was 348 as of 2013. There are 15 streets.

== Geography ==
Alexandrovsky is located 26 km southeast of Aleysk (the district's administrative centre) by road. Sovkhozny is the nearest rural locality.
