= Peschanoye, Topchikhinsky District, Altai Krai =

Peschanoye Песчаное
- Selo
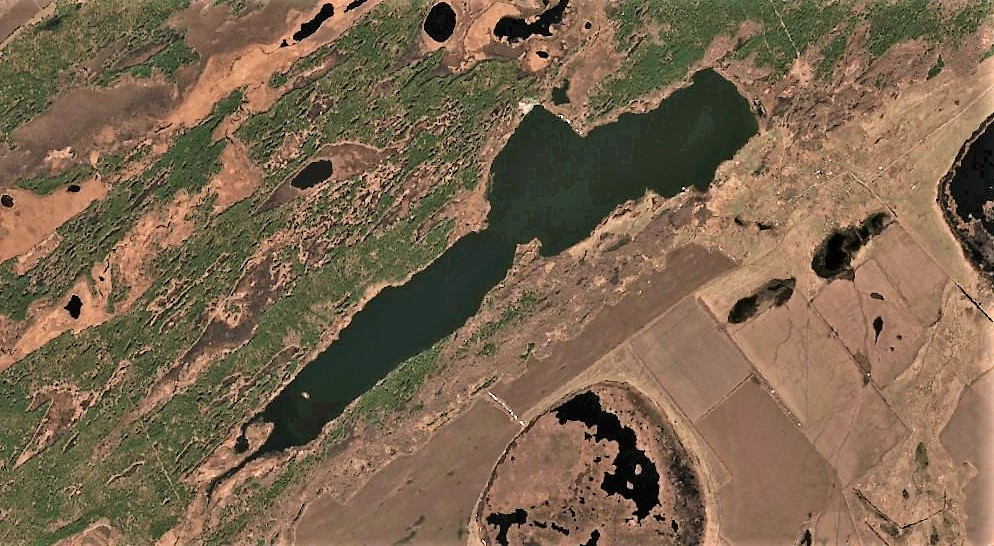
- Lake Peschanoye Sentinel-2 image

- Location within Altai Krai Location within Russia
- Coordinates: 52°47′N 82°30′E
- Country: Russia
- Region: Altai Krai
- District: Topchikhinsky District
- Time zone: UTC+7:00

Peschanoye (Russian: Песчаное) is a rural locality (a selo) in Parfyonovsky Selsoviet, Topchikhinsky District, Altai Krai, Russia. The population was 340 as of 2013. There are 5 streets.

== Geography ==
Peschanoye is located on the Ob Plateau, close to the Peschanoye Lake, 46 km west of Topchikha (the district's administrative centre) by road. Parfyonovo is the nearest rural locality.
