= Aleysky (rural locality) =

Aleysky Алейский
- Settlement
- Location within Altai Krai Location within Russia
- Coordinates: 52°28′N 82°43′E
- Country: Russia
- Region: Altai Krai
- District: Aleysky District
- Time zone: UTC+7:00

Aleysky (Russian: Алейский) is a rural locality (a settlement) and the administrative center of Aleysky Selsoviet, Aleysky District, Altai Krai, Russia. The population was 569 as of 2013. There are 11 streets.

== Geography ==
Aleysky is located 5 km southwest of Aleysk (the district's administrative centre) by road. Aleysk is the nearest rural locality.
