= Kashino, Altai Krai =

Kashino Кашино
- Selo
- Location within Altai Krai Location within Russia
- Coordinates: 52°22′N 82°33′E
- Country: Russia
- Region: Altai Krai
- District: Aleysky District
- Time zone: UTC+7:00

Kashino (Russian: Кашино) is a rural locality (a selo) and the administrative center of Kashinsky Selsoviet, Aleysky District, Altai Krai, Russia. The population was 677 as of 2013. There are 12 streets.

== Geography ==
Kashino is located on the Aley River, 25 km southwest of Aleysk (the district's administrative centre) by road. Krasny Yar is the nearest rural locality.
