= Uspenovka, Altai Krai =

Village in Altai Krai, Russia

Uspenovka Успеновка
- Settlement
- Location within Altai Krai Location within Russia
- Coordinates: 52°31′N 82°53′E
- Country: Russia
- Region: Altai Krai
- District: Aleysky District

Population (2013)
  - Total: 10
- Time zone: UTC+7:00

Uspenovka (Russian: Успеновка) is a rural locality (a settlement) in Bolshepanyushevsky Selsoviet, Aleysky District, Altai Krai, Russia. The population was 10 as of 2013. There are 3 streets.

== Geography ==
Uspenovka is located on the Aley River, 10 km ENE of Aleysk (the district's administrative centre) by road. Bolshepanyushevo is the nearest rural locality.
