= Malakhovo =

Malakhovo Малахово
- Selo
- Location within Altai Krai Location within Russia
- Coordinates: 52°24′N 82°44′E
- Country: Russia
- Region: Altai Krai
- District: Aleysky District
- Time zone: UTC+7:00

Malakhovo (Russian: Малахово) is a rural locality (a selo) in Aleysky Selsoviet, Aleysky District, Altai Krai, Russia. The population was 215 as of 2013. There are 7 streets.

== Geography ==
Malakhovo is located on the Aley River, 13 km south of Aleysk (the district's administrative centre) by road. Zelyonaya Polyana is the nearest rural locality.
