= Zerkalnoye (Altai Krai) =

Salt lake in Altai Krai, Russia

- Зеркальное
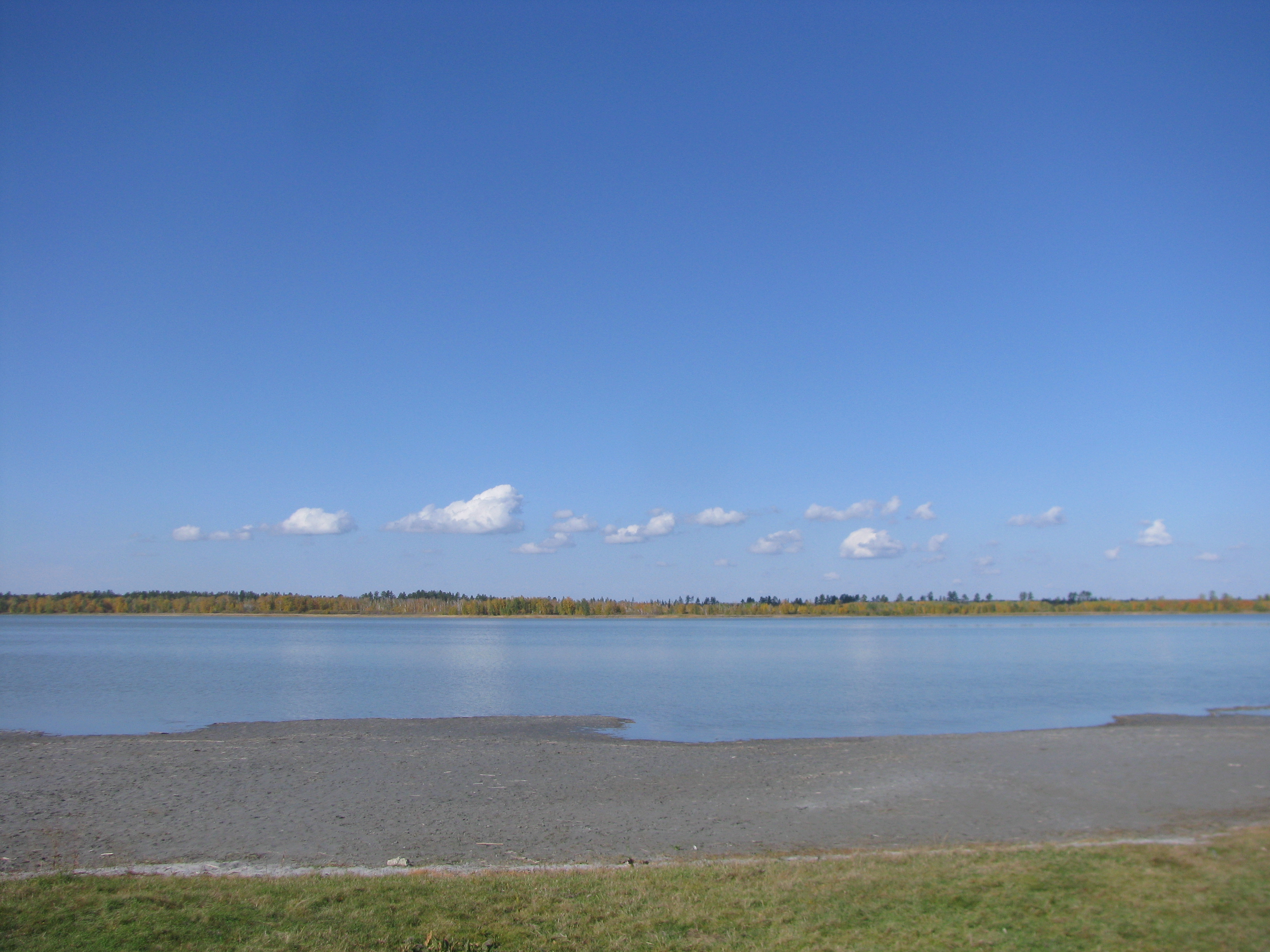
- Panorama of the lake from the shore

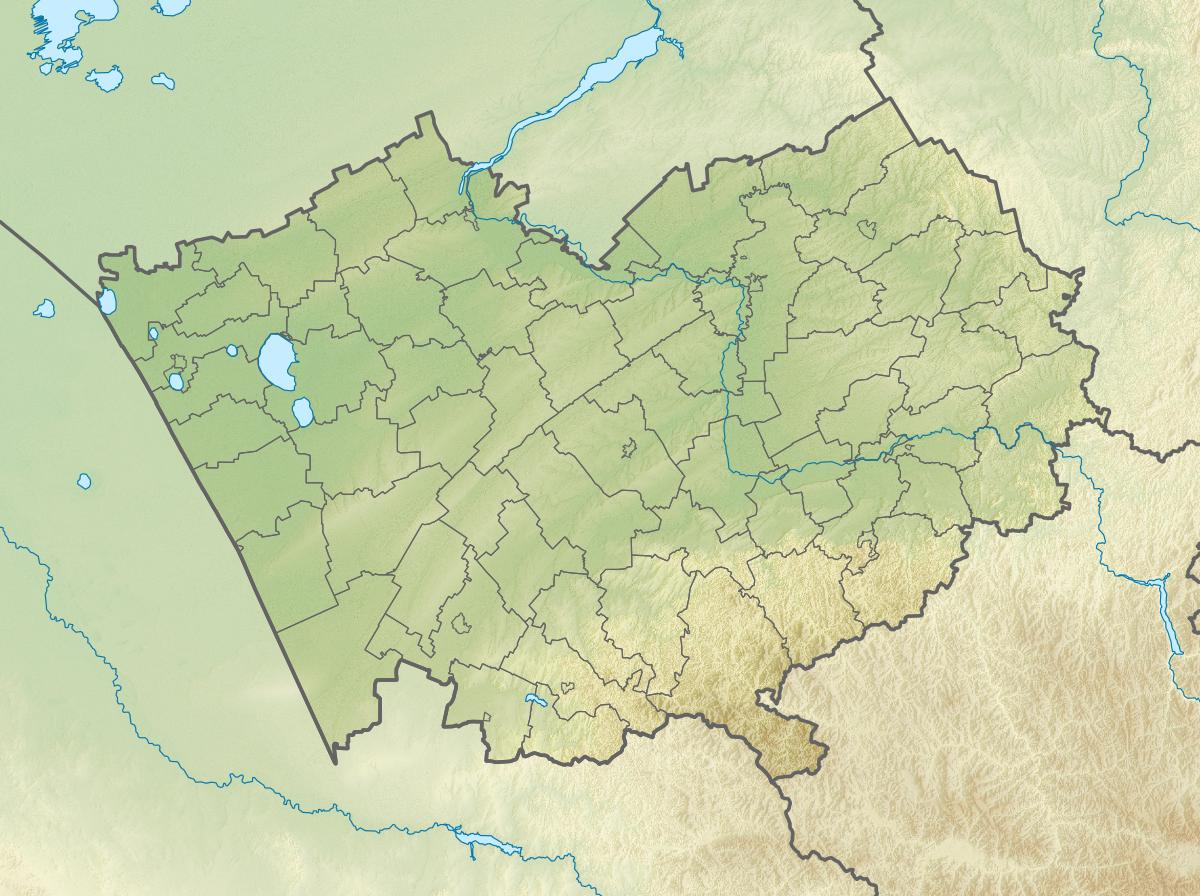
- Location within Altai Krai Location within Russia
- Location: Ob Plateau; West Siberian Plain
- Coordinates: 52°30′32″N 81°51′13″E
- Type: exorheic
- Primary outflows: Barnaulka
- Catchment area: 961 square kilometers (371 sq mi)
- Basin countries: Russia
- Max. length: 11.7 kilometers (7.3 mi)
- Max. width: 2.4 kilometers (1.5 mi)
- Surface area: 18.54 square kilometers (7.16 sq mi)
- Average depth: 1.7 meters (5 ft 7 in)
- Max. depth: 8 meters (26 ft)
- Residence time: UTC+6
- Shore length^{1}: 40.8 kilometers (25.4 mi)
- Surface elevation: 218.2 meters (716 ft)
- ^{1} Shore length is not a well-defined measure.

Zerkalnoye (Russian: Зеркальное) is a salt lake in Shipunovsky District, Altai Krai, Russian Federation.

The lake lies roughly in the middle of the Krai. The nearest town is Zerkaly by the southern lakeshore. Shipunovo, the district capital, lies 44 kilometers (27 mi) to the southeast.

== Geography ==
Zerkalnoye is at the sources of the Barnaulka river. It lies in one of the wide ravines of glacial origin that cut diagonally across the Ob Plateau slanting towards the Ob River. The lake has an elongated shape, stretching roughly from northeast to southwest for over 11 kilometers (6.8 mi). The bottom of the lake is composed of grey silt in 57% of the total area, and of sand and silt in the remaining part.

Lake Gorkoye is located in the same trench 17 kilometers (11 mi) to the southwest and Sredneye 9 kilometers (5.6 mi) to the northeast. Gorkoye lies 21 kilometers (13 mi) to the northwest and Bolshoye Ostrovnoye 22 kilometers (14 mi) to the north.

== Flora and fauna ==
The ribbon pine forest characteristic of the Ob Plateau grows in places close to the lake. Reeds and bulrushes are found in certain sections of the lakeshore and submerged aquatic plants grow further off the shore.

Regarding the fauna of the lake, the larvae of lake flies and mayflies, amphipods, water bugs, ramshorn snails and bivalves deserve mention.

== See also ==
- List of lakes of Russia
