= Sovkhozny, Altai Krai =

Sovkhozny Совхозный
- Settlement
- Location within Altai Krai Location within Russia
- Coordinates: 52°22′N 82°49′E
- Country: Russia
- Region: Altai Krai
- District: Aleysky District
- Time zone: UTC+7:00

Sovkhozny (Russian: Совхозный) is a rural locality (a settlement) and the administrative center of Sovkhozny Selsoviet, Aleysky District, Altai Krai, Russia. The population was 549 as of 2013. There are 8 streets.

== Geography ==
Sovkhozny is located 16 km south of Aleysk (the district's administrative centre) by road. Alexandrovsky is the nearest rural locality.
