= Druzhba, Aleysky District, Altai Krai =

Druzhba Дружба
- Selo
- Location within Altai Krai Location within Russia
- Coordinates: 52°34′N 82°30′E
- Country: Russia
- Region: Altai Krai
- District: Aleysky District
- Time zone: UTC+7:00

Druzhba (Russian: Дружба) is a rural locality (a selo) and the administrative center of Druzhbinsky Selsoviet, Aleysky District, Altai Krai, Russia. The population was 1,068 as of 2013. There are 21 streets.

== Geography ==
Druzhba is located 25 km northwest of Aleysk (the district's administrative centre) by road. Mokhovskoye is the nearest rural locality.
