= Zelyonaya Polyana, Aleysky District, Altai Krai =

Zelyonaya Polyana Зелёная Поляна
- Settlement
- Location within Altai Krai Location within Russia
- Coordinates: 52°26′N 82°46′E
- Country: Russia
- Region: Altai Krai
- District: Aleysky District
- Time zone: UTC+7:00

Zelyonaya Polyana (Russian: Зелёная Поляна) is a rural locality (a settlement) in Fruzensky Selsoviet, Aleysky District, Altai Krai, Russia. The population was 3 as of 2013. There are 4 streets.

== Geography ==
Zelyonaya Polyana is located 10 km south of Aleysk (the district's administrative centre) by road. Malakhovo is the nearest rural locality.
