= Melnikovo, Vologda Oblast =

Melnikovo Мельниково
- Village
- Location within Vologda Oblast Location within Russia
- Coordinates: 59°03′N 40°00′E
- Country: Russia
- Region: Vologda Oblast
- District: Vologodsky District
- Time zone: UTC+3:00

Melnikovo (Russian: Мельниково) is a rural locality (a village) in Podlesnoye Rural Settlement, Vologodsky District, Vologda Oblast, Russia. The population was 4 as of 2002.

== Geography ==
Melnikovo is located 22 km southeast of Vologda (the district's administrative centre) by road. Vinnikovo is the nearest rural locality.
