= Aley (river) =

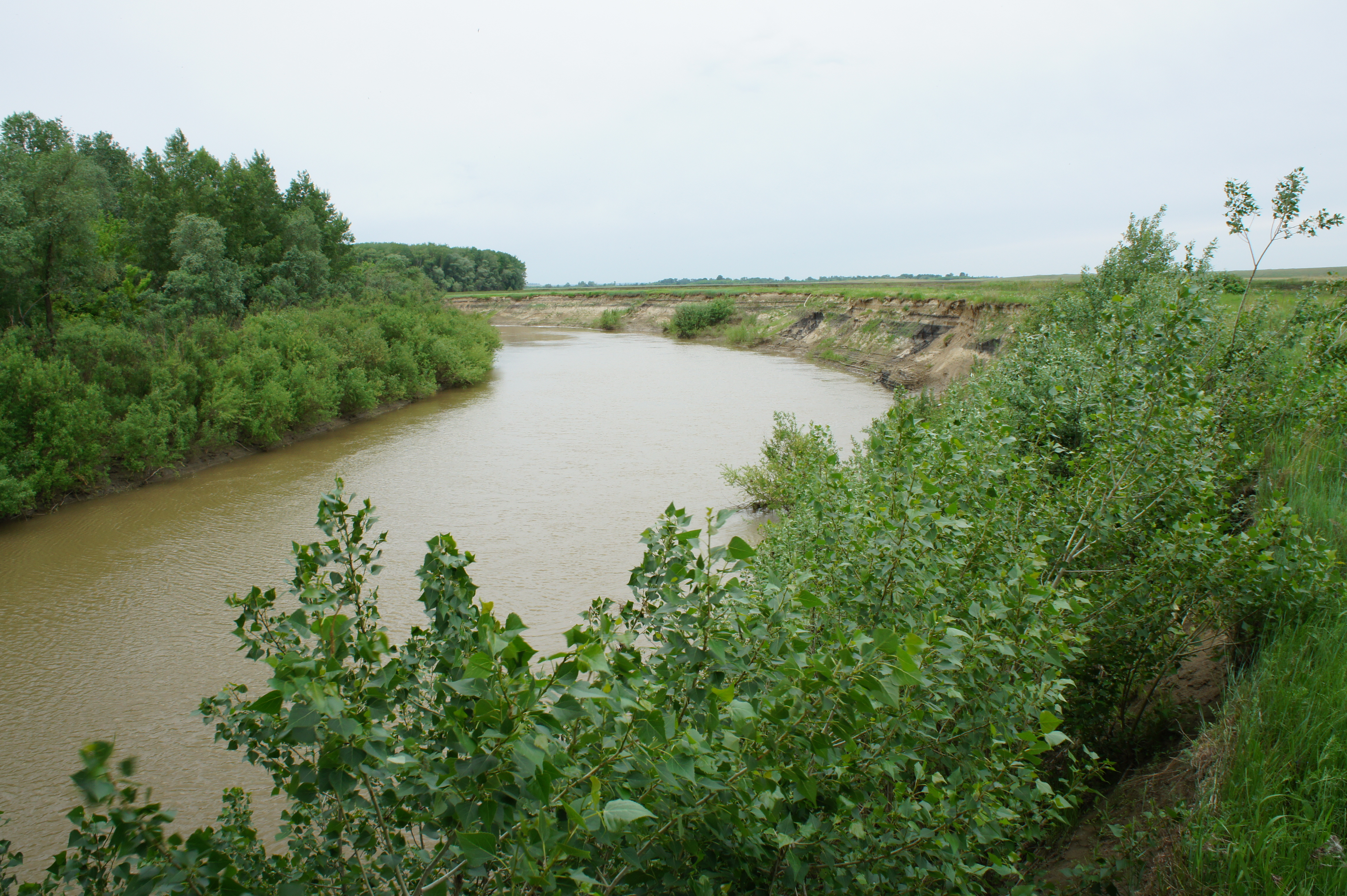
- The Aley in Aleysky District

Location
- Country: Russia

Physical characteristics
- Mouth: Ob
  - coordinates: 52°51′16″N 83°36′59″E
- Length: 858 km (533 mi)
- Basin size: 21,100 km^{2} (8,100 sq mi)

Basin features
- Progression: Ob→ Kara Sea

The Aley (Russian: Алей) is a river in Altai Krai, Russia. It is a left tributary of the Ob. It is 858 kilometres (533 mi) long, and has a drainage basin of 21,100 square kilometres (8,100 sq mi). Some of the towns along the river are Rubtsovsk, Gorkovskoye and Aleysk.

== Course ==
The river flows along the Ob Plateau in its middle and lower course.

== See also ==
- Inland port
- List of rivers of Russia
