= Mokhovskoye =

Mokhovskoye Моховское
- Selo
- Location within Altai Krai Location within Russia
- Coordinates: 52°37′N 82°29′E
- Country: Russia
- Region: Altai Krai
- District: Aleysky District
- Time zone: UTC+7:00

Mokhovskoye (Russian: Моховское) is a rural locality (a selo) and the administrative center of Mokhovsky Selsoviet, Aleysky District, Altai Krai, Russia. The population was 854 as of 2013. There are 18 streets.

== Geography ==
Mokhovskoye is located 27 km northwest of Aleysk (the district's administrative centre) by road. Druzhba is the nearest rural locality.
