= Barnaulka =

River in Siberia, Russia

Barnaulka Барнаулка
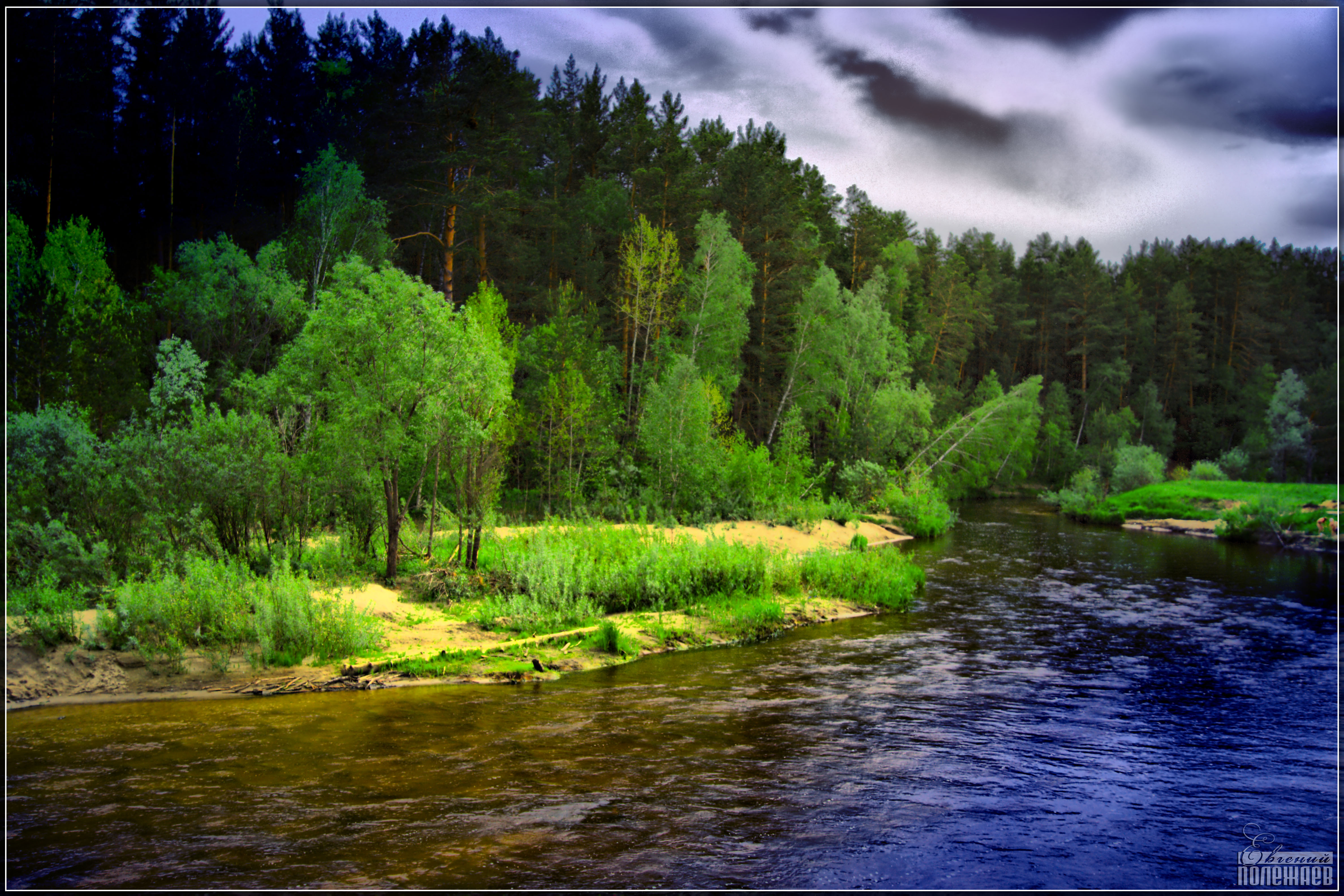
- View of the river

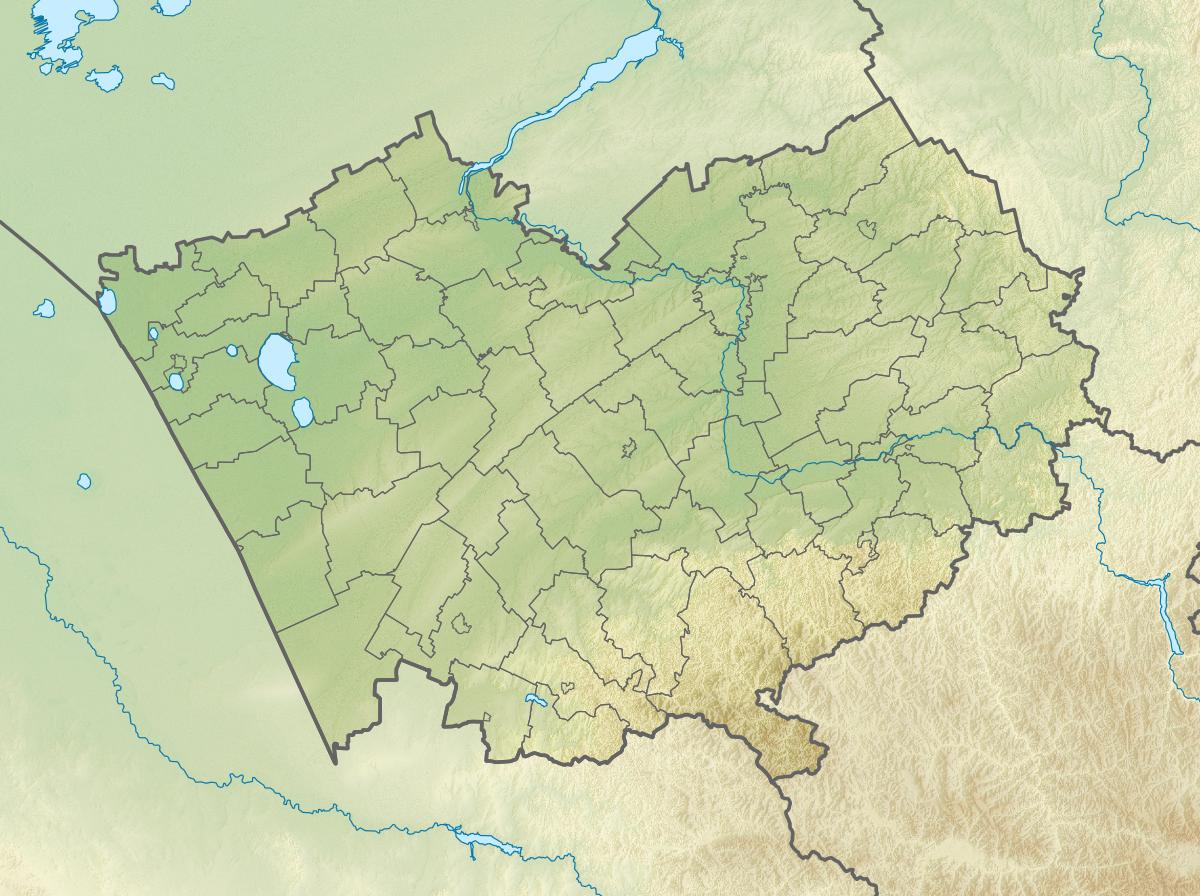
- Mouth location in Altai Krai, Russia

Location
- Country: Russia

Physical characteristics
- Source: Lake Zerkalnoye
  - coordinates: 52°33′21″N 81°57′10″E
- Mouth: Ob
  - location: Barnaul
  - coordinates: 53°19′47″N 83°48′18″E
- Length: 207 km (129 mi)
- Basin size: 5,720 km^{2} (2,210 sq mi)

Basin features
- Progression: Ob→ Kara Sea

The Barnaulka (Russian: Барнаулка) is a river in Altai Krai, Russia. The river is 207 kilometres (129 mi) long and has a catchment area of 5,720 square kilometres (2,210 sq mi).

The basin of the river is located in the Rebrikhinsky, Shipunovsky and Pavlovsky districts. The city of Barnaul is named after the river. The Barnaulka suffers from the impact of pollutants released by industrial activity along its course.

== Course ==
The Barnaulka is a left tributary of the Ob river. It has its sources in Zerkalnoye, a lake with a surface of 18 square kilometres (6.9 sq mi) lying 60 km (37 mi) to the west of Aleysk. The river flows in a roughly northeastern direction. The upper course of the river is within a trench of glacial origin of the Ob Plateau. The river basin includes a chain of lakes connected by marshy canals, such as Bakhmatovskoye and Peschanoye, as well as numerous swamps and smaller lakes. Finally the Barnaulka meets the left bank of the Ob at Barnaul, 3,409 km (2,118 mi) from the Ob's mouth.

=== Tributaries ===
The longest tributary of the Barnaulka is the 18 km (11 mi) long Vlasikha (Власиха) on the left. The river is largely fed by groundwater. It is frozen between November and April.

== See also ==
- Inland port
- List of rivers of Russia
