= Bolshepanyushevo =

Bolshepanyushevo Большепанюшево
- Selo
- Location within Altai Krai Location within Russia
- Coordinates: 52°30′N 82°52′E
- Country: Russia
- Region: Altai Krai
- District: Aleysky District
- Time zone: UTC+7:00

Bolshepanyushevo (Russian: Большепанюшево) is a rural locality (a selo) and the administrative center of Bolshepanyushevsky Selsoviet, Aleysky District, Altai Krai, Russia. The population was 507 as of 2013. There are 9 streets.

== Geography ==
Bolshepanyushevo is located on the Aley river, 8 km northeast of Aleysk (the district's administrative centre) by road. Uspenovka is the nearest rural locality.
