= Melnikovo, Ivanovo Oblast =

Melnikovo Мельниково
- Village
- Location within Ivanovo Oblast Location within Russia
- Coordinates: 57°08′N 41°27′E
- Country: Russia
- Region: Ivanovo Oblast
- District: Rodnikovsky District
- Time zone: UTC+3:00

Melnikovo (Russian: Мельниково) is a rural locality (a village) in Rodnikovsky District, Ivanovo Oblast, Russia. Population: 69 (2010 census);

== Geography ==
This rural locality is located 17 kilometres (11 mi) from Rodniki (the district's administrative centre), 34 kilometres (21 mi) from Ivanovo (capital of Ivanovo Oblast) and 278 kilometres (173 mi) from Moscow. Popovskoye is the nearest rural locality.
