= Kostin Log =

Kostin Log Костин Лог
- Village
- Location within Altai Krai Location within Russia
- Coordinates: 52°39′N 82°02′E
- Country: Russia
- Region: Altai Krai
- District: Mamontovsky District
- Time zone: UTC+7:00

Kostin Log (Russian: Костин Лог) is a rural locality (a selo) in Kostino-Logovskoy Selsoviet of Mamontovsky District, Altai Krai, Russia. The population was 1,209 in 2016. There are 12 streets.

== Geography ==
Kostin Log is located 42 km east of Mamontovo (the district's administrative centre) by road. Travnoye is the nearest rural locality.
