= Novichikha =

Novichikha Новичиха
- Selo
- Interactive map of Novichikha
- Location of Novichikha Novichikha (Altai Krai)
- Coordinates: 52°12′30″N 81°23′45″E
- Country: Russia
- Federal subject: Altai Krai
- Administrative district: Novichikhinsky District
- SelsovietSelsoviet: Novichikhinsky Selsoviet
- Founded: 1885

Population (2010 Census)
  - Total: 4,284
  - Estimate (2021): 3,711 (−13.4%)

Administrative status
  - Capital of: Novichikhinsky District, Novichikhinsky Selsoviet

Municipal status
  - Municipal district: Novichikhinsky Municipal District
  - Rural settlement: Novichikhinsky Selsoviet Rural Settlement
  - Capital of: Novichikhinsky Municipal District, Novichikhinsky Selsoviet Rural Settlement
- Time zone: UTC+7 (MSK+4)
- Postal code: 659730
- OKTMO ID: 01628444101

Novichikha (Russian: Новичиха) is a rural locality (a selo) and the administrative center of Novichikhinsky District of Altai Krai, Russia. Population: 4,284 (2010 census); 4,495 (2002 census); 4,273 (1989 Soviet census).

== Geography ==
Lake Gorkoye is located 4.5 kilometers (2.8 mi) to the west of the town.
