= Novichikhinsky District =

Novichikhinsky District Новичихинский район (Russian)
- District
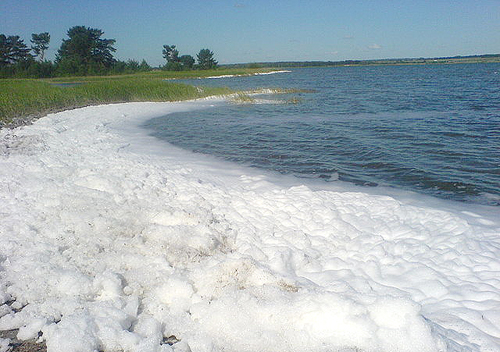
- Lake Gorikoye, Novichikhinsky District

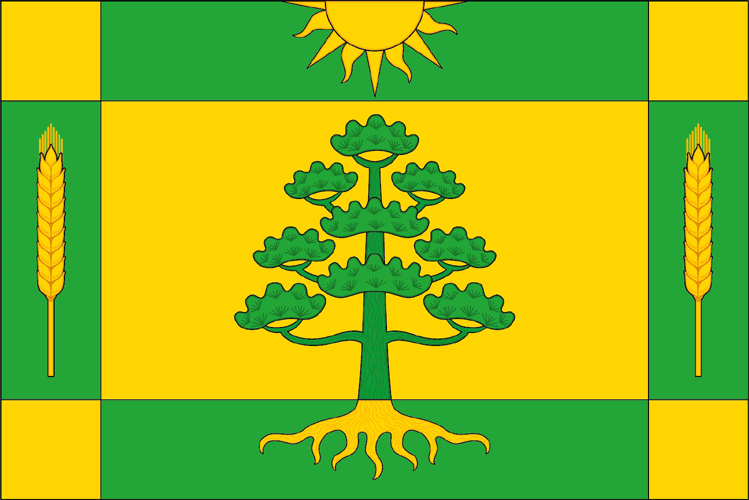
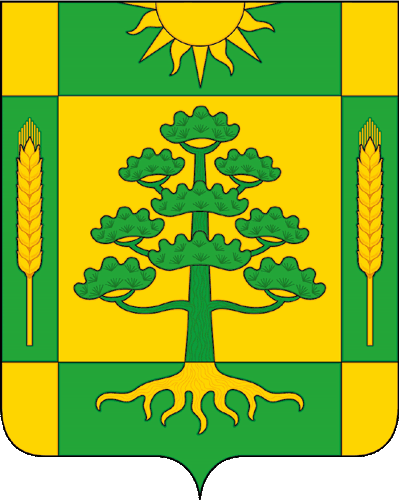
- Flag Coat of arms
- Location of Novichikhinsky District in Altai Krai
- Coordinates: 52°13′N 81°24′E
- Country: Russia
- Federal subject: Altai Krai
- Established: 1935
- Administrative center: Novichikha

Area
  - Total: 3,100 km^{2} (1,200 sq mi)

Population (2010 Census)
  - Total: 9,938
  - Density: 3.2/km^{2} (8.3/sq mi)
  - Urban: 0%
  - Rural: 100%

Administrative structure
  - Administrative divisions: 7 selsoviet
  - Inhabited localities: 16 rural localities

Municipal structure
  - Municipally incorporated as: Novichikhinsky Municipal District
  - Municipal divisions: 0 urban settlements, 7 rural settlements
- Time zone: UTC+7 (MSK+4)
- OKTMO ID: 01628000
- Website: http://www.novichiha.ru/

Novichikhinsky District (Russian: Новичи́хинский райо́н) is an administrative and municipal district (raion), one of the fifty-nine in Altai Krai, Russia. It is located in the center of the krai. The area of the district is 3,100 square kilometers (1,200 sq mi). Its administrative center is the rural locality (a selo) of Novichikha. Population: 9,938 (2010 census); 11,558 (2002 census); 11,980 (1989 Soviet census). The population of Novichikha accounts for 43.1% of the district's total population.

== Geography ==
Lake Gorkoye is located in the district.
