= Open and closed lakes =

Major subdivisions of lakes

Open and closed lakes refer to the major subdivisions of lakes – bodies of water surrounded by land. Exorheic, or open, lakes drain into a river or other body of water that ultimately drains into the ocean. Endorheic basins fall into the category of endorheic or closed lakes, wherein waters do not drain into the ocean, but are reduced by evaporation, and/or drain into the ground.

== Open lake ==
An open lake is a lake from which water constantly flows out under almost all climatic circumstances. Because water does not remain in an open lake for any length of time, dissolved solids do not accumulate, and such lakes are usually fresh water. Open lakes form in areas where precipitation is greater than evaporation. Because most of the world's water is found in areas of highly effective rainfall, most lakes are open lakes whose water eventually reaches the sea. For instance, the Great Lakes' water flows into the St. Lawrence River and eventually the Atlantic Ocean.

Open lakes typically have relatively stable water levels that do not fluctuate, as input is always matched by outflow to rivers downstream. If more water enters an open lake than was previously leaving it, then more water will leave the lake. The drainage from an open lake, like that from ordinary rivers, is referred to as exorheic (from the Greek exos, outside and rhein, to flow).

== Closed lake ==
In a closed lake (see endorheic drainage), no water flows out. Water that is not evaporated will remain in a closed lake indefinitely. This means that closed lakes are usually saline, though this salinity varies greatly from around three parts per thousand for most of the Caspian Sea to as much as 400 parts per thousand for the Dead Sea. Only the less salty closed lakes are able to sustain life, and life in them is completely different from that in rivers or freshwater open lakes. Closed lakes typically form in areas where evaporation is greater than rainfall, although most closed lakes actually obtain their water from a region with much higher precipitation than the area around the lake itself, which is often a depression of some sort.

The level of most closed lakes is unstable because if runoff into the lake is lessened, the water balance of a closed lake is altered, and the amount of water in the lake falls. This is what has caused the shrinkage of the Aral Sea, formerly the world's second largest closed lake. Similarly, if runoff into a closed lake is increased, then the level will increase because evaporation is not likely to increase at all - let alone enough to stabilise the level of the lake.

Fluctuation in the level of closed lakes is therefore much more useful in paleoclimatology than are studies of open lakes which can reduce the level of outflow if inflow decreases.

== Conversion between an open and a closed lake ==
If the amount of water entering a closed lake is increased beyond a certain level—for most closed lakes, far more than would normally enter the lake—the water level in the lake could rise so much that the lake would no longer be capable of containing it. This is rare but known conclusively in the case of Lake Corangamite in southern Victoria, when a succession of wet years during the 1950s caused the level of the lake to rise so much that it almost overflowed. There is a great deal of evidence that Lake Corangamite was an open lake prior to the end of the Little Ice Age—some evidence suggests it was an open lake for much of the Holocene due to a wetter climate.

The inflow into an open lake could decrease so much that any outflow would dry the lake up completely; that is, the open lake would become a closed lake. The only currently open lake for which there is any evidence of a closed lake previously existing in the same location is Lake Malawi in Africa. In very dry periods, outflow from the Shire River—Lake Malawi's only outlet—can drop precipitously, and it is strongly believed that during past dry periods, outflow from Lake Malawi has ceased entirely and salt has accumulated, especially during the Last Glacial Maximum and other similarly dry periods.

Apart from Australia and Southern Africa, runoff variability is rarely high enough for these changes to take place on a useful time scale, and lakes forming in areas where conversions from closed to open or open to closed are likely are very rare, though a few exist.

- Lake Titicaca, the largest lake in South America, has historically been a semi-open lake with very limited outflow, but recent glacial retreat has reduced inflows so much that some believe it could become a completely closed lake in the future.
- North Dakota's Devils Lake, historically a closed lake, was an open lake during the Medieval Warm Period. Since 1999, possibly due to global warming, Devils Lake has overflowed into Stump Lake, which could overflow into the Red River of the North if present wet conditions in the region continue.
- The former Tulare Lake in California overflowed its basin in some years but not others, switching between being an open and closed lake.
