= Ribbon forest =

Forest that occurs in long thin bands

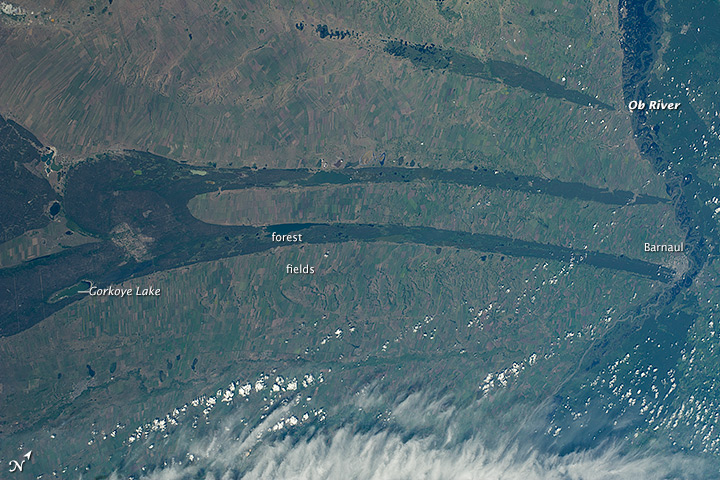
Ob Plateau, Altai Krai, Russia. The dark east-west strips are examples of ribbon forest, forested with pines and dotted with salt-rich lakes. The image shows a distance of a little more than 300 km (190 mi) from left to right, and the forested strips are nearly that length.

Ribbon forests or tape forests are forests in the form of long thin bands. In many places this may be the result of deforestation, including deliberate attempts to leave a habitat corridor in largely deforested areas, to allow wildlife to move between the remaining pockets of forest. But in North America and Russia it refers to two different natural patterns of forest growth caused by features of the local soil and climate history.

== North America ==
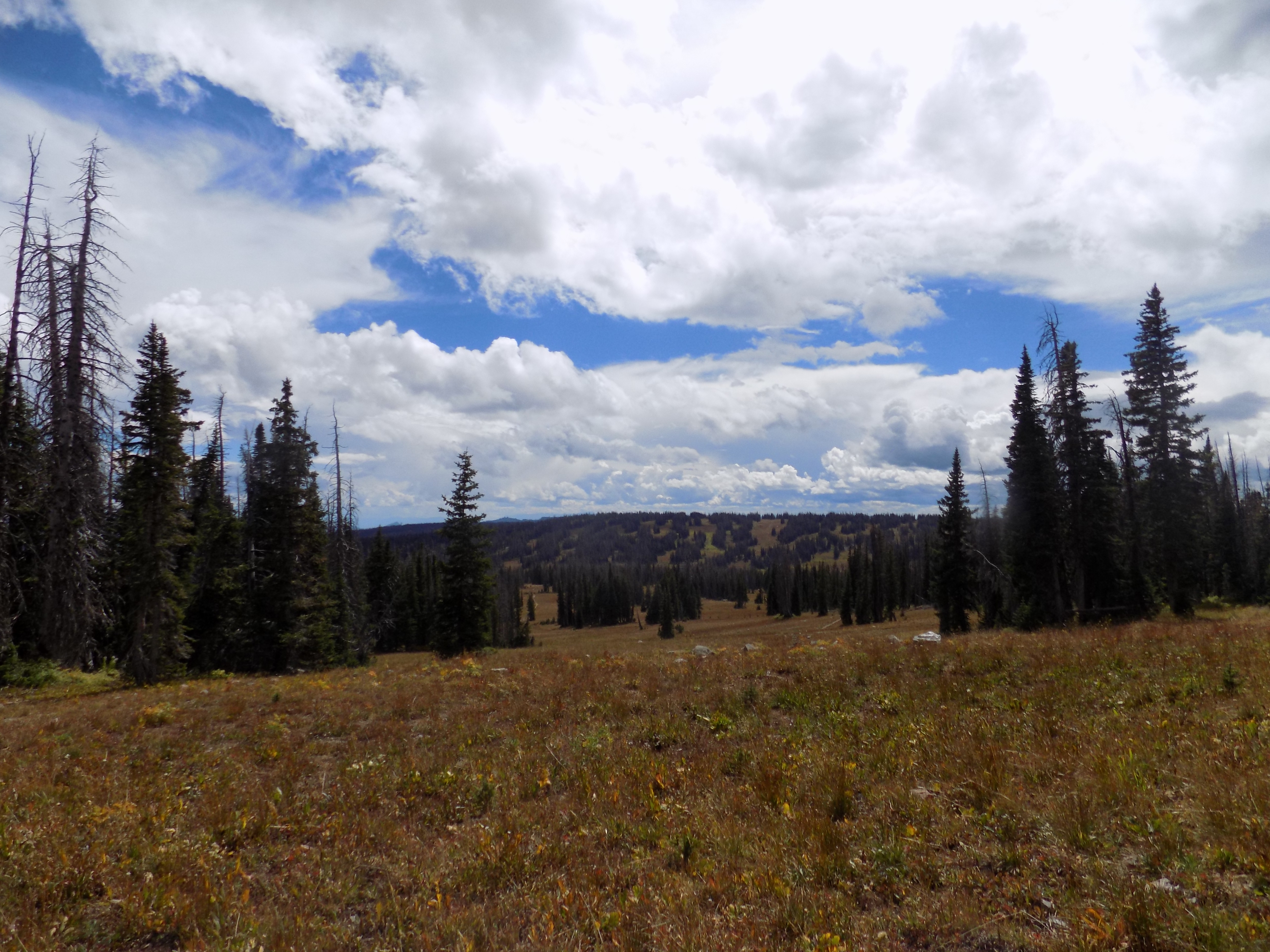
Ribbon forest at 11,000 feet in the southern Mount Zirkel Wilderness, Colorado, US.

In North America, the term "Ribbon forest" is used to describe a unique habitat type found near the tree line in the subalpine zone of the Rocky Mountains. It is made up of bands of subalpine forest and meadow that are created when deep snow and wind forces trees to grow only in bands, about twenty feet wide and thirty feet apart, that have enough shelter. Areas that have this habitat type include the southern Mount Zirkel Wilderness and the Medicine Bow Mountains. Not surprisingly, these areas get some of the Southern Rockies' largest amounts of snow. The area between Mad Creek and Buffalo Pass in the southern Park Range has Colorado's highest amount of snowfall, averaging 25 to 30 feet per winter.

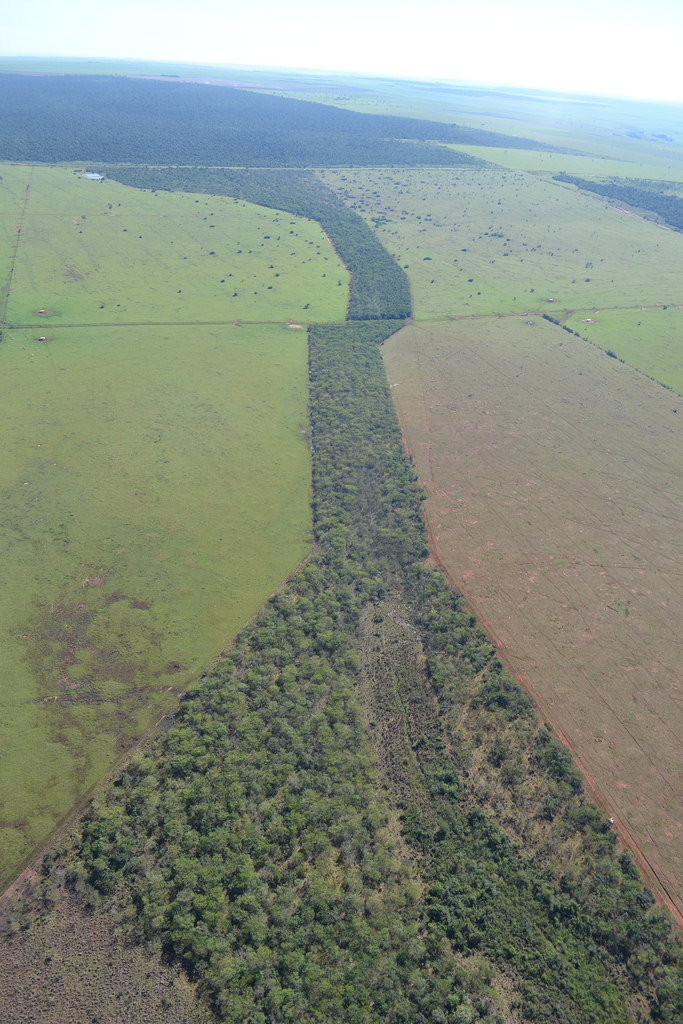
A habitat corridor in Brazil

== Russia ==
In Russia, the term "Ribbon forest" or "Tape forest" refers to a more large-scale phenomenon of long, narrow bands of forest stretching from northeast to southwest in Siberia. These bands can be 100 miles long and less than 2 miles wide. The outcroppings of pine (mostly Pinus sibirica) grow on bands of sandy soil left behind by glaciers that retreated at the end of the last ice age.
