= Rebrikhinsky District =

Rebrikhinsky District Ребрихинский район (Russian)
- District
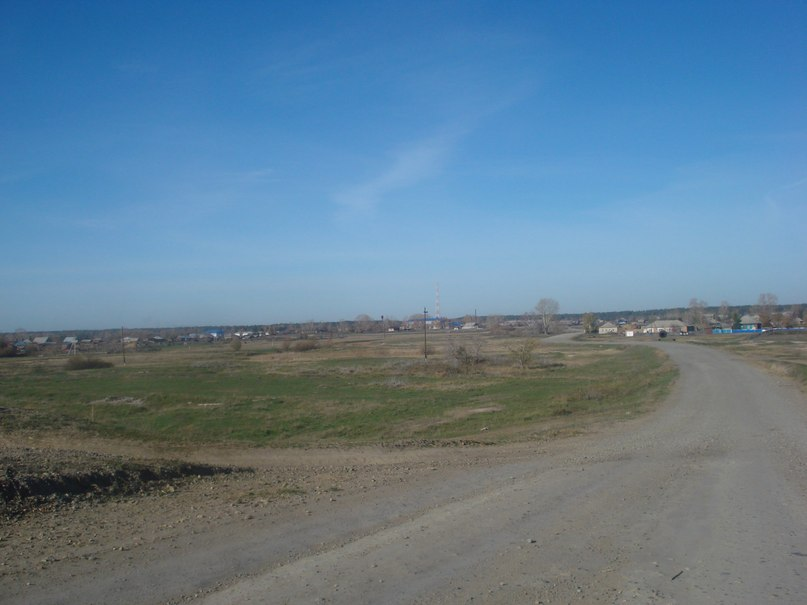
- Entrance to the selo of Ust-Mosikha in Rebrikhinsky District

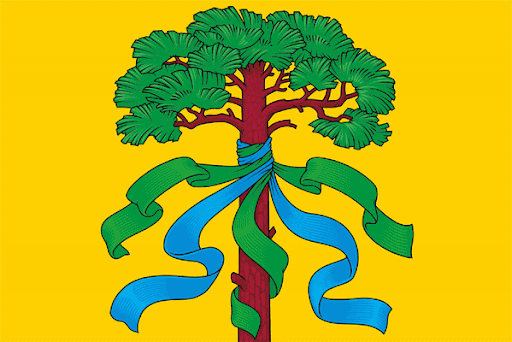
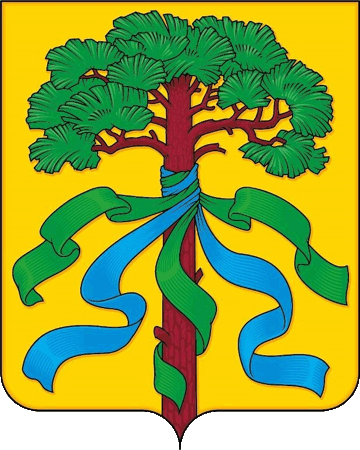
- Flag Coat of arms
- Location of Rebrikhinsky District in Altai Krai
- Coordinates: 53°05′N 82°20′E
- Country: Russia
- Federal subject: Altai Krai
- Established: 27 May 1924
- Administrative center: Rebrikha

Area
  - Total: 2,686 km^{2} (1,037 sq mi)

Population (2010 Census)
  - Total: 24,559
  - Density: 9.143/km^{2} (23.68/sq mi)
  - Urban: 0%
  - Rural: 100%

Administrative structure
  - Administrative divisions: 14 Selsoviets
  - Inhabited localities: 28 rural localities

Municipal structure
  - Municipally incorporated as: Rebrikhinsky Municipal District
  - Municipal divisions: 0 urban settlements, 14 rural settlements
- Time zone: UTC+7 (MSK+4)
- OKTMO ID: 01635000
- Website: http://www.admrebr.ru

Population of Rebrikhinsky District
- 2010 Census: 24,559
- 2002 Census: 28,238
- 1989 Census: 30,488
- 1979 Census: 33,140

Rebrikhinsky District (Russian: Ребри́хинский райо́н) is an administrative and municipal district (raion), one of the fifty-nine in Altai Krai, Russia. It is located in the north of the krai. The area of the district is 2,686 square kilometers (1,037 sq mi). Its administrative center is the rural locality (a selo) of Rebrikha. As of the 2010 Census, the total population of the district was 24,559, with the population of Rebrikha accounting for 34.5% of that number.

== Geography ==
Rebrikhinsky District is located in the north-central region of Altai Krail. The terrain is relatively flat forest-steppe, with some ravines, on the Ob Plateau. The soils are a variety of medium-humus chernozems, sandy areas in the ravines, and salt marshes. The main river through the district is the Kasmala, which flows from southwest to northeast through the district, ultimately joining the Ob River about 50 km to the northeast. The Kulunda runs parallel to the Kasmala, and forms the northern border of the district, while a third river, the Barnaulka, runs along the southern border.

Rebrikhinsky District is 75 km west of the regional city of Barnaul, and 2,800 km southeast of Moscow. The area measures 65 km (north-south), and 55 km (west-east); total area is 2,686 km2 (about 1.6% of Altai Krai). The administrative center is the town of Rebrikha.

The district is bordered on the north by Shelabolikhinsky District, on the east by Pavlovsky District, on the south by Aleysky District, and on the west by Mamontovsky District.
