= Rebrikha, Rebrikhinsky Selsoviet, Rebrikhinsky District, Altai Krai =

Rural locality in Russia

Coordinates: 53.075°N 82.338°E

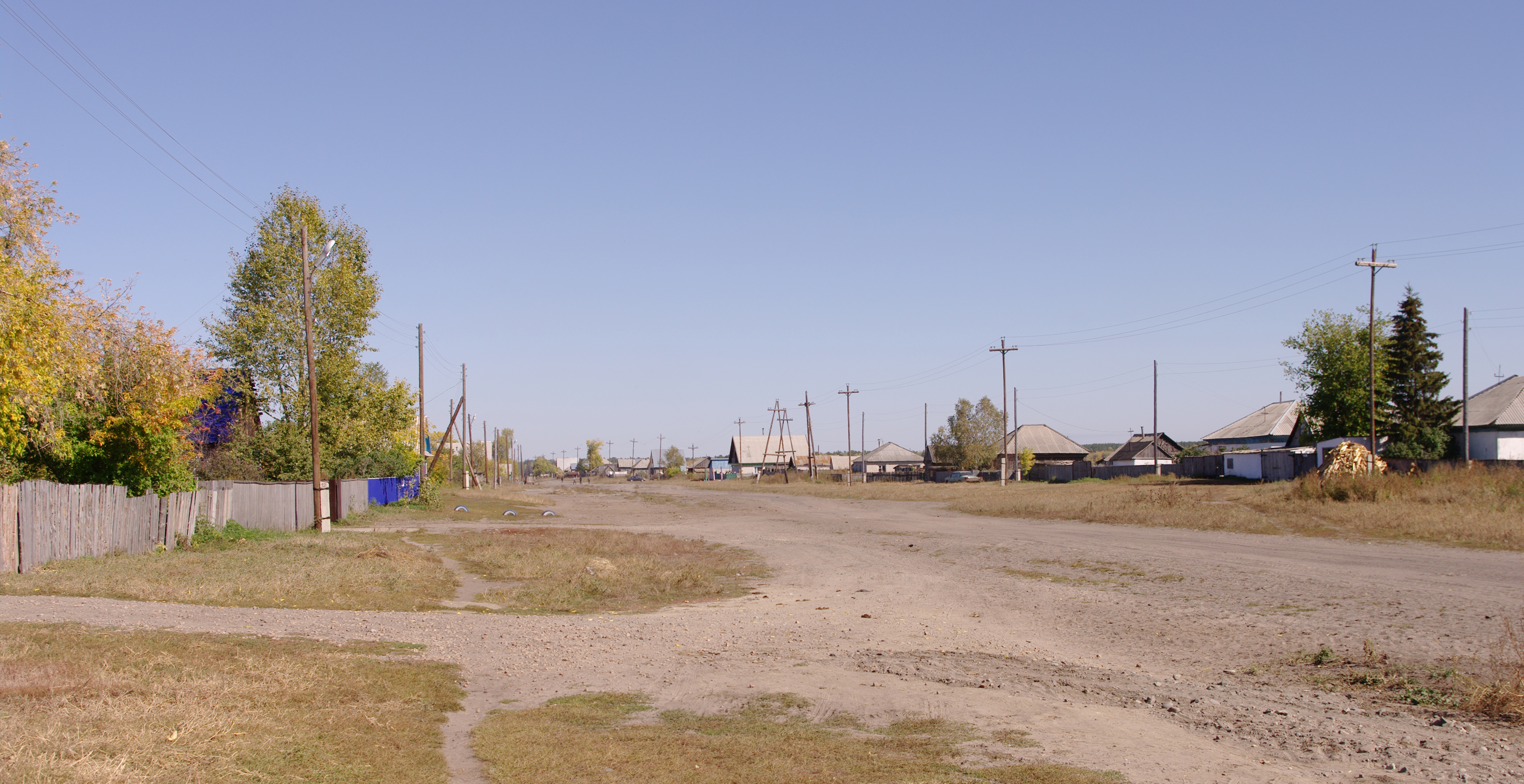
Demyan Bedny street

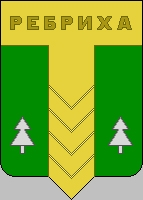
Coat of arms of Rebrikha

Rebrikha (Russian: Ребриха) is a rural locality (a selo) and the administrative center of Rebrikhinsky District of Altai Krai, Russia. Population: 8,468 (2010 census); 8,771 (2002 census); 8,604 (1989 Soviet census).
