= Shipunovo, Shipunovsky Selsoviet, Shipunovsky District, Altai Krai =

Shipunovo Шипуново
- Village
- Location within Altai Krai Location within Russia
- Coordinates: 52°13′N 82°15′E
- Country: Russia
- Region: Altai Krai
- District: Shipunovsky District
- Time zone: UTC+7:00

Shipunovo (Russian: Шипуново) is a rural locality (a selo) and the administrative center of Shipunovsky Selsoviet of Shipunovsky District, Altai Krai, Russia. The population was 13,462 in 2016. There are 98 streets.

== Geography ==
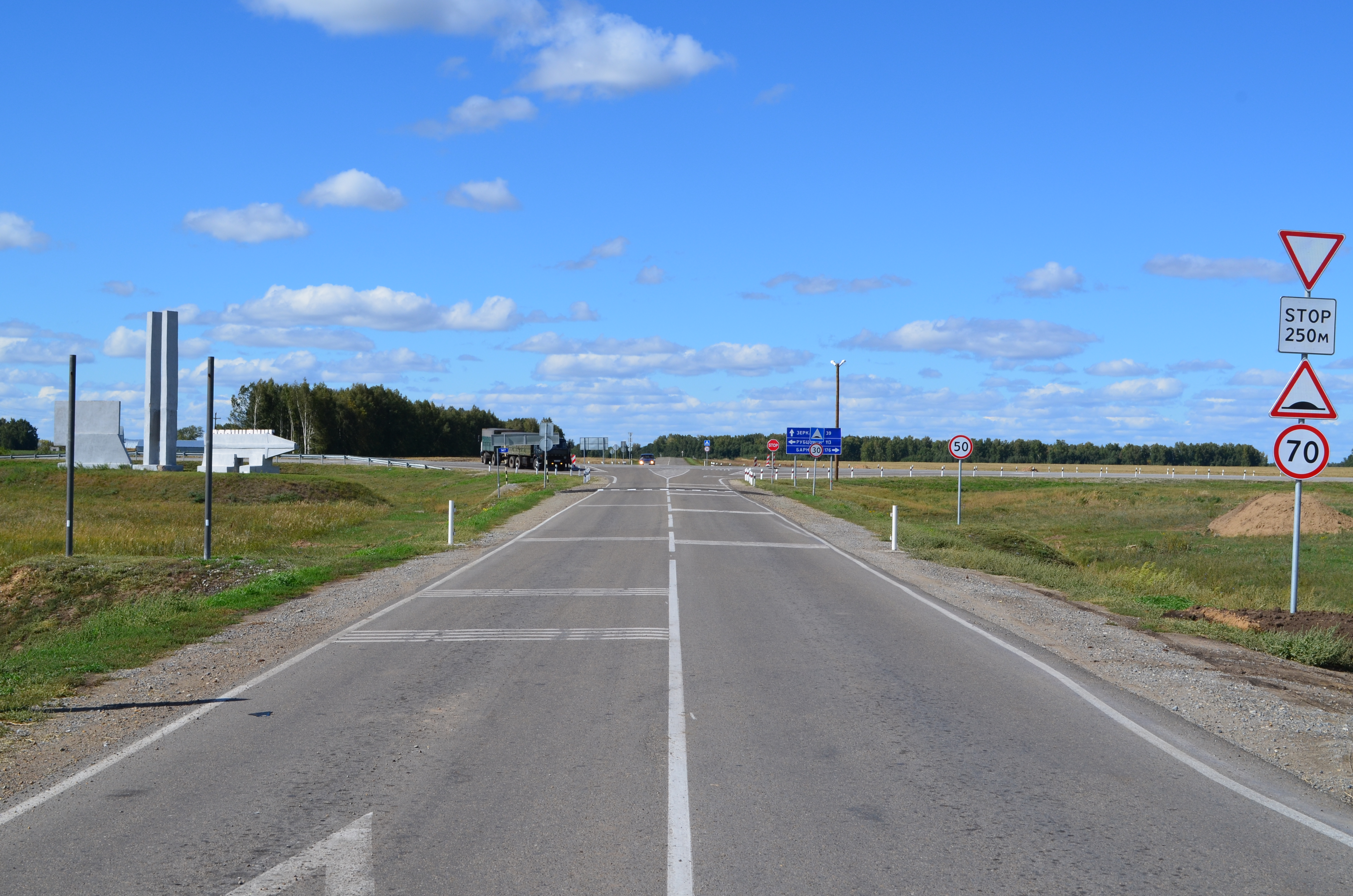
Road exit from Shipunovo to the A322 highway.

The village is located 165 south from Barnaul between Aley and Klepechikha Rivers.
