= Ob Plateau =

Plateau in Siberia, Russia

- Приобское плато
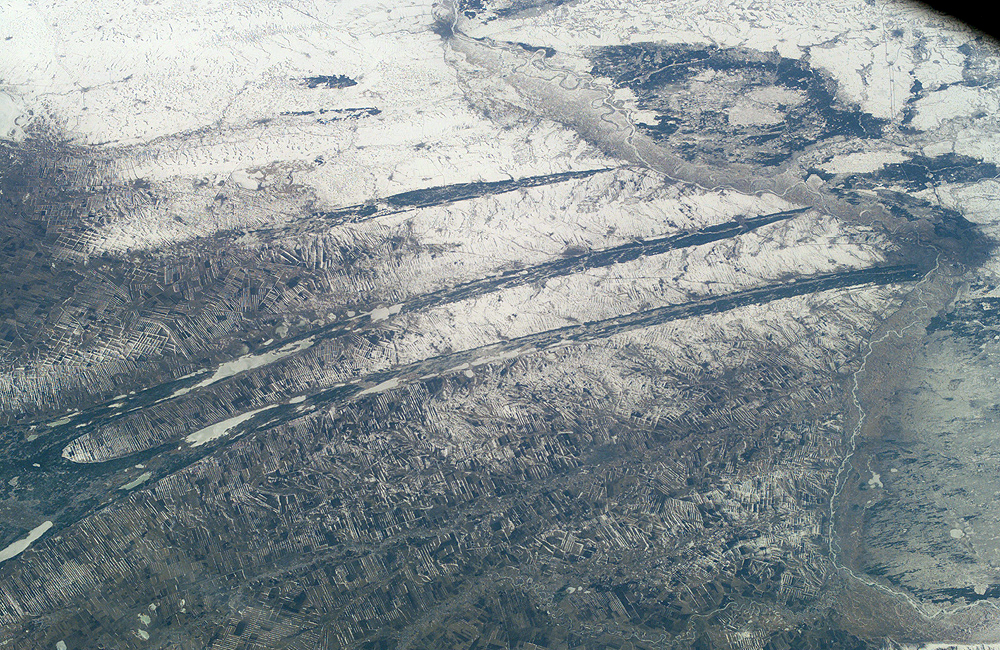
- NASA satellite image showing the straight and parallel ravines of glacial origin

Highest point
- Peak: Unnamed
- Elevation: 321 m (1,053 ft)

Geography
- Location within Russia
- Country: Russia
- Federal subject: Altai Krai, Novosibirsk Oblast
- Range coordinates: 53°30′N 81°0′E
- Parent range: West Siberian Plain

Geology
- Rock age: Quaternary
- Rock type(s): Loess-like loam, sand

The Ob Plateau (Russian: Приобское плато, Priobskoye Plato), is one of the great plateaus of Siberia. Administratively it falls within Altai Krai and Novosibirsk Oblast, Siberian Federal District, Russia. The plateau is named after the Ob River and is part of its basin.

Most of the territory of the plateau has been agriculturally developed, yielding grain crops as well as industrial crops. The Kulunda Main Canal, built at the time of the USSR, runs in a roughly southwest/northeast direction across the plateau.

== Geography ==
The Ob Plateau is located in Altai Krai and Novosibirsk Oblast at the southern edge of the West Siberian Plain. It extends roughly to the north of the foothills of the Altai Mountains along the left bank of the north-flowing Ob River. To the west it descends gradually to the Kulunda Plain.

The average height of the Ob Plateau surface is between 250 meters (820 ft) and 260 meters (850 ft), reaching a maximum height of 321 metres (1,053 ft) at an unnamed summit. The plateau is dissected diagonally by wide ravines of glacial origin slanting towards the Ob river. They are about 10 kilometers (6.2 mi) in width and between 40 meters (130 ft) to 100 meters (330 ft) deep, stretching parallel to each other in a roughly northeast to southwest direction. Chernozem soils predominate in the open steppe spaces of the plateau.

=== Hydrography ===
Some of the main rivers of the plateau are the Aley, Barnaulka, Kulunda, Burla, Karasuk, Bagan and Kasmala among others. Within the glacial trenches there are a number of salt lakes, such as Gorkoye (Chernokurynskoye), Gorkoye (Novichikhinsky District), Gorkoye (Tyumentsevsky District), Bakhmatovskoye and Gorkoye-Peresheyechnoye.

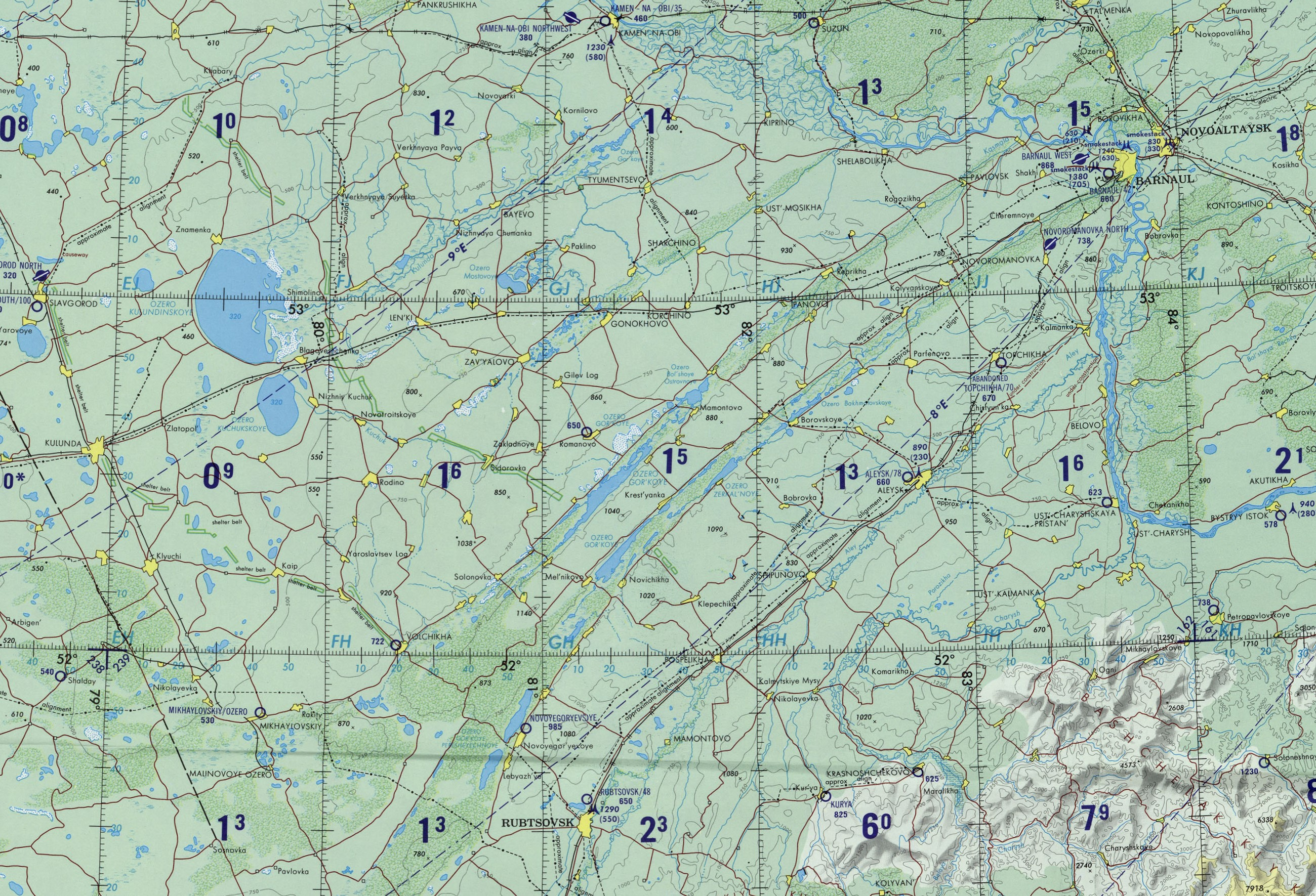
Ob Plateau area ONC map section.

== Flora ==
There are forests made up mostly of birch in the ravines, as well as remnants of coniferous taiga in higher areas. Wetlands and lakes are common in the river valleys cutting across the plateau.

== See also ==
- Geography of Russia § Topography and drainage
