= Shipunovsky District =

Shipunovsky District Шипуновский район (Russian)
- District
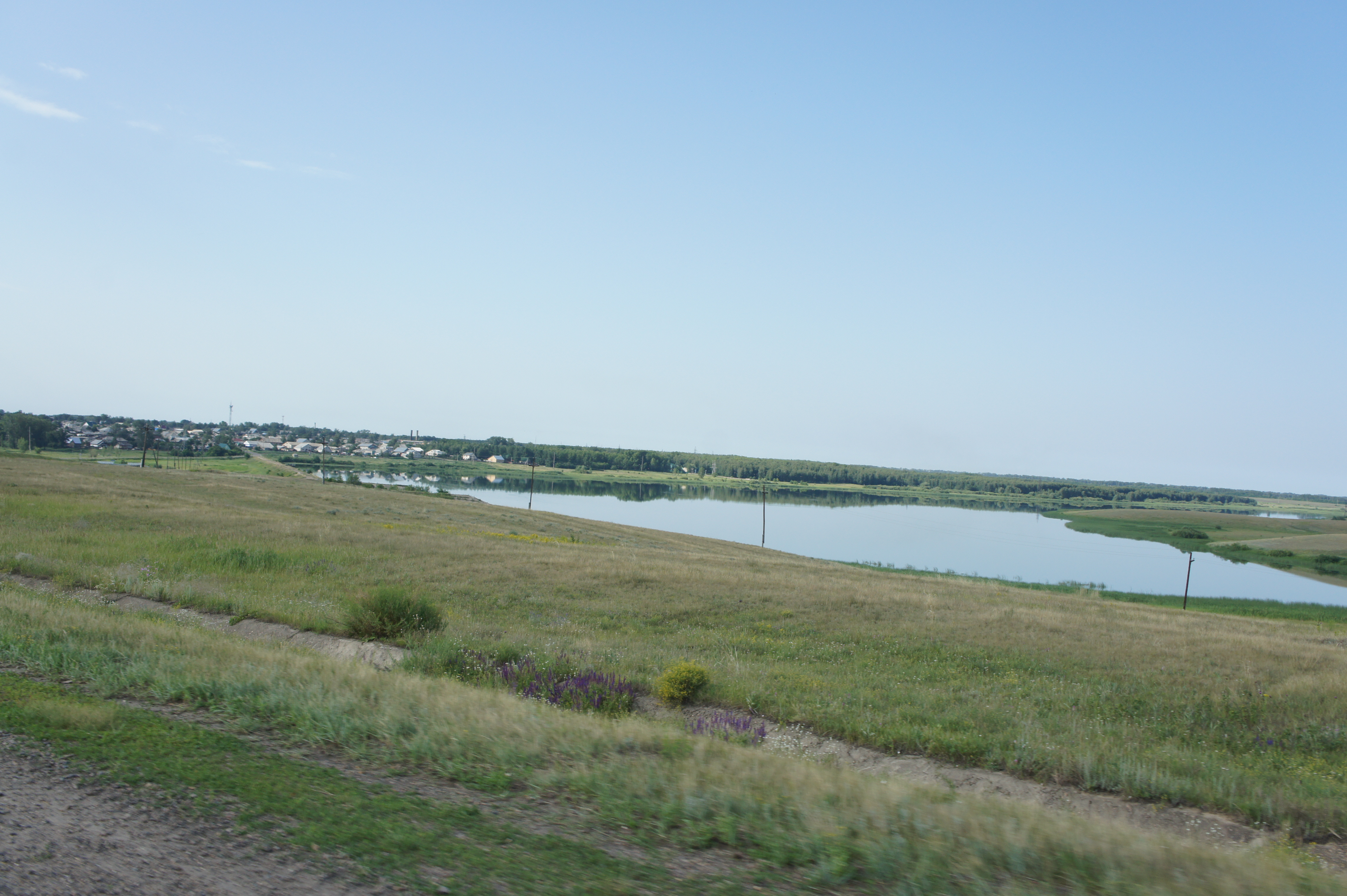
- Village Shipunovo, Shipunovsky District

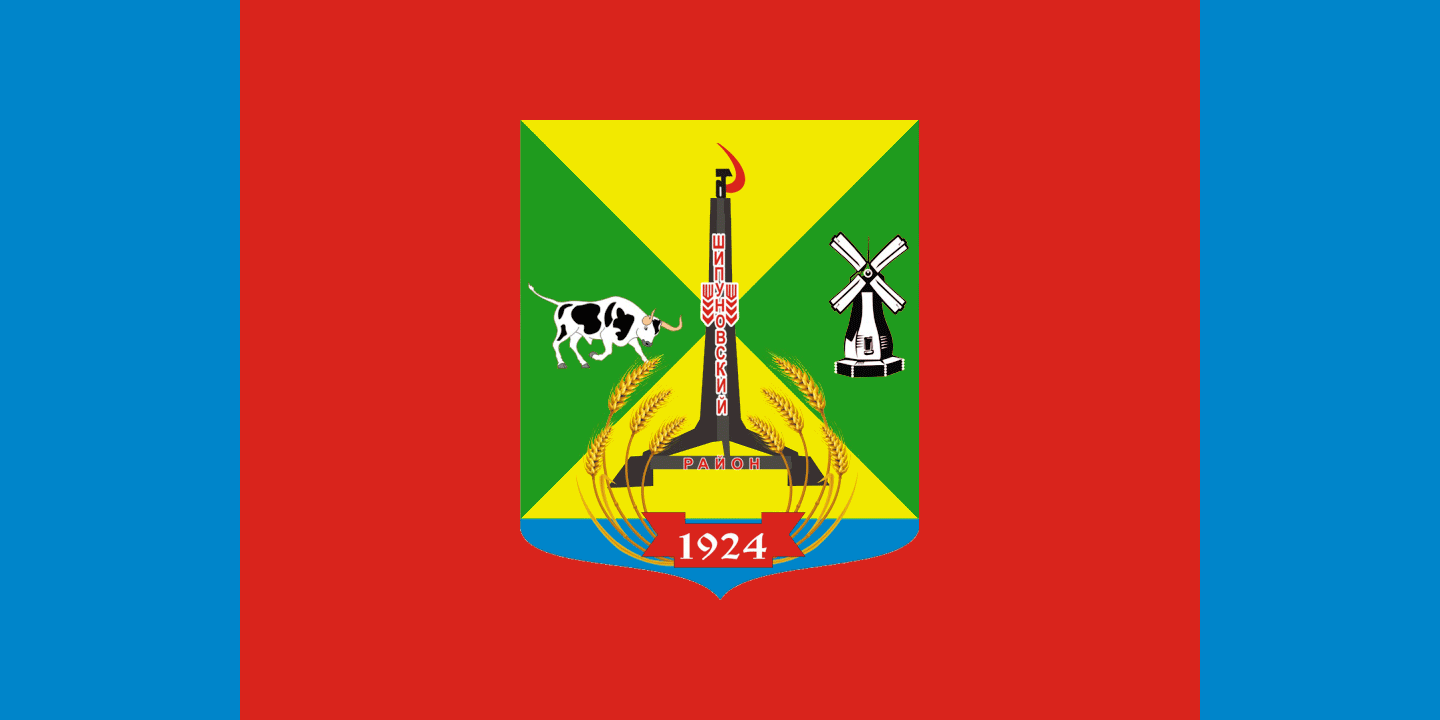
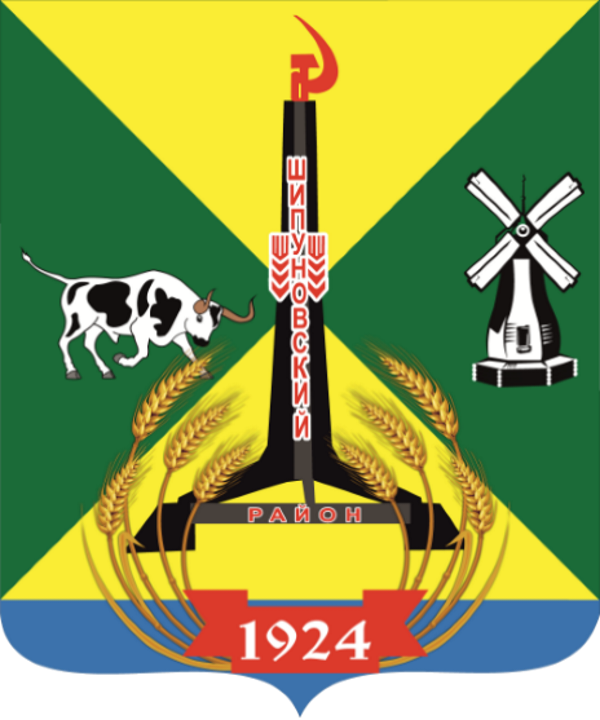
- Flag Coat of arms
- Location of Shipunovsky District in Altai Krai
- Coordinates: 52°13′N 82°16′E
- Country: Russia
- Federal subject: Altai Krai
- Established: 27 June 1924
- Administrative center: Shipunovo

Area
  - Total: 4,130 km^{2} (1,590 sq mi)

Population (2010 Census)
  - Total: 33,285
  - Density: 8.06/km^{2} (20.9/sq mi)
  - Urban: 0%
  - Rural: 100%

Administrative structure
  - Administrative divisions: 19 selsoviet
  - Inhabited localities: 50 rural localities

Municipal structure
  - Municipally incorporated as: Shipunovsky Municipal District
  - Municipal divisions: 0 urban settlements, 19 rural settlements
- Time zone: UTC+7 (MSK+4)
- OKTMO ID: 01659000
- Website: http://www.shipunovo.ru/

Shipunovsky District (Russian: Шипуно́вский райо́н) is an administrative and municipal district (raion), one of the fifty-nine in Altai Krai, Russia. It is located in the center of the krai. The area of the district is 4,130 square kilometers (1,590 sq mi). Its administrative center is the rural locality (a selo) of Shipunovo. Population: 33,285 (2010 census); 36,299 (2002 census); 36,810 (1989 Soviet census). The population of the administrative center accounts for 36.4% of the district's total population.

== Geography ==
Lake Zerkalnoye is located in the district.
