= Aleysky District =

Aleysky District Алейский район (Russian)
- District
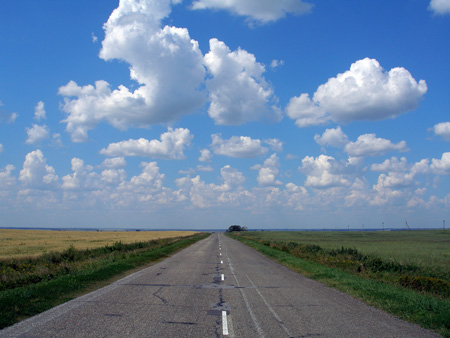
- Route A349 in Aleysky District

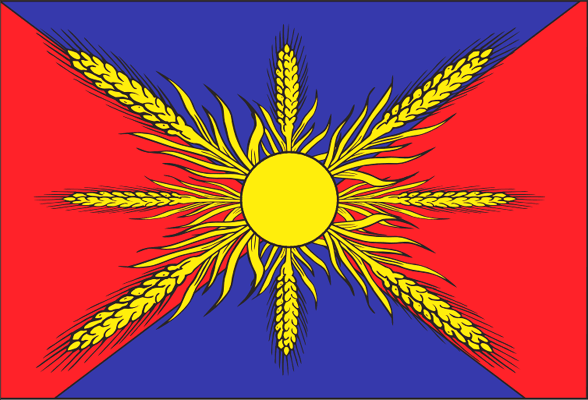
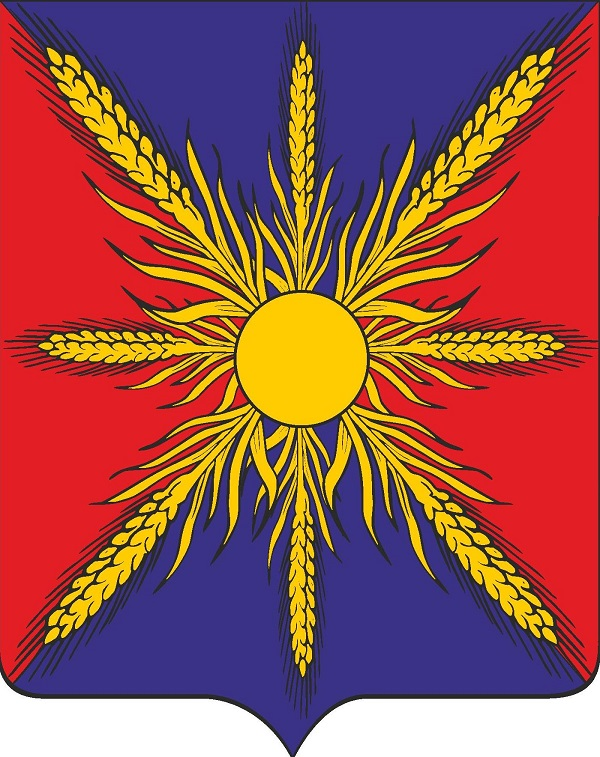
- Flag Coat of arms
- Location of Aleysky District in Altai Krai
- Coordinates: 52°30′N 82°47′E
- Country: Russia
- Federal subject: Altai Krai
- Established: 1924
- Administrative center: Aleysk

Area
  - Total: 3,400 km^{2} (1,300 sq mi)

Population (2010 Census)
  - Total: 16,800
  - Density: 4.9/km^{2} (13/sq mi)
  - Urban: 0%
  - Rural: 100%

Administrative structure
  - Administrative divisions: 19 Selsoviets
  - Inhabited localities: 43 rural localities

Municipal structure
  - Municipally incorporated as: Aleysky Municipal District
  - Municipal divisions: 0 urban settlements, 19 rural settlements
- Time zone: UTC+7 (MSK+4)
- OKTMO ID: 01601000
- Website: http://www.aladm.ru/

Aleysky District (Russian: Але́йский райо́н) is an administrative and municipal district (raion), one of the fifty-nine in Altai Krai, Russia. It is located in the center of the krai. The area of the district is 3,400 square kilometers (1,300 sq mi). Its administrative center is the town of Aleysk (which is not administratively a part of the district). Population: 16,800 (2010 census); 20,474 (2002 census); 21,510 (1989 Soviet census).

== Administrative and municipal status ==
Within the framework of administrative divisions, Aleysky District is one of the fifty-nine in the krai. The town of Aleysk serves as its administrative center, despite being incorporated separately as a town of krai significance—an administrative unit with the status equal to that of the districts.

As a municipal division, the district is incorporated as Aleysky Municipal District. The town of krai significance of Aleysk is incorporated separately from the district as Aleysk Urban Okrug.

== Geography ==
Lakes Sredneye and Bakhmatovskoye are located in the district.
