= Komsomolsky, Russia =

Komsomolsky (Russian: Комсомо́льский; masculine), Komsomolskaya (Комсомо́льская; feminine), or Komsomolskoye (Комсомо́льское; neuter) is the name of several inhabited localities in Russia.

== Modern localities ==
=== Republic of Adygea ===
As of 2012, one rural locality in the Republic of Adygea bears this name:

- Komsomolsky, Republic of Adygea, a settlement in Koshekhablsky District; 44°54′N 40°26′E

=== Altai Krai ===
As of 2012, four rural localities in Altai Krai bear this name:

- Komsomolsky, Mamontovsky District, Altai Krai, a settlement in Komsomolsky Selsoviet of Mamontovsky District; 52°58′N 81°37′E
- Komsomolsky, Pavlovsky District, Altai Krai, a settlement in Komsomolsky Selsoviet of Pavlovsky District; 53°16′N 83°23′E
- Komsomolsky, Soloneshensky District, Altai Krai, a settlement in Karpovsky Selsoviet of Soloneshensky District; 51°47′N 84°32′E
- Komsomolsky, Topchikhinsky District, Altai Krai, a settlement in Parfenovsky Selsoviet of Topchikhinsky District; 52°49′N 82°51′E

=== Arkhangelsk Oblast ===
As of 2012, two rural localities in Arkhangelsk Oblast bear this name:

- Komsomolsky, Krasnoborsky District, Arkhangelsk Oblast, a settlement in Novoshinsky Selsoviet of Krasnoborsky District
- Komsomolsky, Velsky District, Arkhangelsk Oblast, a settlement in Verkhneshonoshsky Selsoviet of Velsky District

=== Astrakhan Oblast ===
As of 2012, one rural locality in Astrakhan Oblast bears this name:

- Komsomolsky, Astrakhan Oblast, a settlement in Akhtubinsky Selsoviet of Krasnoyarsky District; 46°51′N 47°57′E

=== Republic of Bashkortostan ===
As of 2012, four rural localities in the Republic of Bashkortostan bear this name:

- Komsomolsky, Davlekanovsky District, Republic of Bashkortostan, a selo in Rassvetovsky Selsoviet of Davlekanovsky District
- Komsomolsky, Duvansky District, Republic of Bashkortostan, a village in Duvansky Selsoviet of Duvansky District
- Komsomolsky, Karaidelsky District, Republic of Bashkortostan, a selo in Karayarsky Selsoviet of Karaidelsky District
- Komsomolsky, Miyakinsky District, Republic of Bashkortostan, a village in Karanovsky Selsoviet of Miyakinsky District

=== Belgorod Oblast ===
As of 2012, two rural localities in Belgorod Oblast bear this name:

- Komsomolsky, Belgorodsky District, Belgorod Oblast, a settlement in Belgorodsky District
- Komsomolsky, Prokhorovsky District, Belgorod Oblast, a settlement in Prokhorovsky District

=== Republic of Buryatia ===
As of 2012, one rural locality in the Republic of Buryatia bears this name:

- Komsomolskoye, Republic of Buryatia, a selo in Komsomolsky Selsoviet of Yeravninsky District

=== Chechen Republic ===
As of 2012, two rural localities in the Chechen Republic bear this name:

- Komsomolskoye, Groznensky District, Chechen Republic, a selo in Komsomolskaya Rural Administration of Groznensky District
- Komsomolskoye, Gudermessky District, Chechen Republic, a selo in Komsomolskaya Rural Administration of Gudermessky District

=== Chelyabinsk Oblast ===
As of 2012, five rural localities in Chelyabinsk Oblast bear this name:

- Komsomolsky, Argayashsky District, Chelyabinsk Oblast, a settlement in Khudayberdinsky Selsoviet of Argayashsky District
- Komsomolsky, Bredinsky District, Chelyabinsk Oblast, a settlement in Komsomolsky Selsoviet of Bredinsky District
- Komsomolsky, Kizilsky District, Chelyabinsk Oblast, a settlement in Granitny Selsoviet of Kizilsky District
- Komsomolsky, Varnensky District, Chelyabinsk Oblast, a settlement in Kateninsky Selsoviet of Varnensky District
- Komsomolskoye, Chelyabinsk Oblast, a selo in Petropavlovsky Selsoviet of Verkhneuralsky District

=== Chukotka Autonomous Okrug ===
As of 2012, one urban locality in Chukotka Autonomous Okrug bears this name:

- Komsomolsky, Chukotka Autonomous Okrug, an urban-type settlement in Chaunsky District

=== Chuvash Republic ===
As of 2012, one rural locality in the Chuvash Republic bears this name:

- Komsomolskoye, Chuvash Republic, a selo in Komsomolskoye Rural Settlement of Komsomolsky District

=== Republic of Dagestan ===
As of 2012, two inhabited localities in the Republic of Dagestan bear this name:

Urban localities

- Komsomolsky, Republic of Dagestan, a settlement under the administrative jurisdiction of the Town of Kizlyar; 43°59′N 46°42′E

Rural localities

- Komsomolskoye, Republic of Dagestan, a selo in Kizilyurtovsky District; 43°12′N 46°54′E

=== Kabardino-Balkar Republic ===
As of 2012, one rural locality in the Kabardino-Balkar Republic bears this name:

- Komsomolskoye, Kabardino-Balkar Republic (or Komsomolsky), a selo in Prokhladnensky District; 43°52′N 43°57′E

=== Republic of Kalmykia ===
As of 2012, one rural locality in the Republic of Kalmykia bears this name:

- Komsomolsky, Republic of Kalmykia, a settlement in Komsomolskaya Rural Administration of Chernozemelsky District; 45°20′N 46°3′E

=== Kemerovo Oblast ===
As of 2012, one rural locality in Kemerovo Oblast bears this name:

- Komsomolsky, Kemerovo Oblast, a settlement in Shishinskaya Rural Territory of Topkinsky District; 55°22′N 85°10′E

=== Khanty-Mansi Autonomous Okrug ===
As of 2012, one rural locality in Khanty-Mansi Autonomous Okrug bears this name:

- Komsomolsky, Khanty-Mansi Autonomous Okrug, a settlement in Oktyabrsky District

=== Kirov Oblast ===
As of 2012, one rural locality in Kirov Oblast bears this name:

- Komsomolsky, Kirov Oblast, a settlement in Komsomolsky Rural Okrug of Kotelnichsky District; 58°11′N 48°0′E

=== Komi Republic ===
As of 2012, one urban locality in the Komi Republic bears this name:

- Komsomolsky, Komi Republic (or Komsomolskaya), an urban-type settlement incorporated as an Urban-Type Settlement Administrative Territory under the administrative jurisdiction of the town of republic significance of Vorkuta; 67°34′N 63°48′E

=== Krasnodar Krai ===
As of 2012, eight rural localities in Krasnodar Krai bear this name:

- Komsomolsky, Belorechensky District, Krasnodar Krai, a settlement in Pervomaysky Rural Okrug of Belorechensky District; 44°56′N 39°42′E
- Komsomolsky, Gulkevichsky District, Krasnodar Krai, a settlement in Komsomolsky Rural Okrug of Gulkevichsky District; 45°18′N 40°42′E
- Komsomolsky, Kavkazsky District, Krasnodar Krai, a settlement in Mirskoy Rural Okrug of Kavkazsky District; 45°33′N 40°20′E
- Komsomolsky, Korenovsky District, Krasnodar Krai, a settlement in Novoberezansky Rural Okrug of Korenovsky District; 45°38′N 39°29′E
- Komsomolsky, Kurganinsky District, Krasnodar Krai, a settlement in Oktyabrsky Rural Okrug of Kurganinsky District; 45°3′N 40°41′E
- Komsomolsky, Kushchyovsky District, Krasnodar Krai, a settlement in Pervomaysky Rural Okrug of Kushchyovsky District; 46°30′N 39°24′E
- Komsomolsky, Novokubansky District, Krasnodar Krai, a settlement in Kovalevsky Rural Okrug of Novokubansky District; 45°13′N 40°52′E
- Komsomolsky, Timashyovsky District, Krasnodar Krai, a settlement in Poselkovy Rural Okrug of Timashyovsky District; 45°33′N 38°46′E

=== Krasnoyarsk Krai ===
As of 2012, one rural locality in Krasnoyarsk Krai bears this name:

- Komsomolsky, Krasnoyarsk Krai, a settlement in Bolshesalbinsky Selsoviet of Idrinsky District

=== Kurgan Oblast ===
As of 2012, three rural localities in Kurgan Oblast bear this name:

- Komsomolskaya, Kargapolsky District, Kurgan Oblast, a village in Maysky Selsoviet of Kargapolsky District; 55°55′N 64°13′E
- Komsomolskaya, Shadrinsky District, Kurgan Oblast, a village in Baturinsky Selsoviet of Shadrinsky District; 55°54′N 63°39′E
- Komsomolskaya, Zverinogolovsky District, Kurgan Oblast, a village in Kruglyansky Selsoviet of Zverinogolovsky District; 54°31′N 64°58′E

=== Kursk Oblast ===
As of 2012, one rural locality in Kursk Oblast bears this name:

- Komsomolsky, Kursk Oblast, a settlement in Yaryginsky Selsoviet of Pristensky District

=== Leningrad Oblast ===
As of 2012, one rural locality in Leningrad Oblast bears this name:

- Komsomolskoye, Leningrad Oblast, a settlement under the administrative jurisdiction of Kamennogorskoye Settlement Municipal Formation in Vyborgsky District; 60°52′N 28°48′E

=== Mari El Republic ===
As of 2012, two rural localities in the Mari El Republic bear this name:

- Komsomolsky, Morkinsky District, Mari El Republic, a settlement in Korkatovsky Rural Okrug of Morkinsky District; 56°25′N 48°34′E
- Komsomolsky, Sovetsky District, Mari El Republic, a settlement in Verkh-Ushnursky Rural Okrug of Sovetsky District; 56°45′N 48°37′E

=== Republic of Mordovia ===
As of 2012, one urban locality in the Republic of Mordovia bears this name:

- Komsomolsky, Republic of Mordovia, a work settlement in Chamzinsky District; 54°26′N 45°50′E

=== Nizhny Novgorod Oblast ===
As of 2012, two rural localities in Nizhny Novgorod Oblast bear this name:

- Komsomolsky, Shakhunya, Nizhny Novgorod Oblast, a settlement in Luzhaysky Selsoviet under the administrative jurisdiction of the town of oblast significance of Shakhunya
- Komsomolsky, Bogorodsky District, Nizhny Novgorod Oblast, a settlement in Kamensky Selsoviet of Bogorodsky District

=== Republic of North Ossetia–Alania ===
As of 2012, one rural locality in the Republic of North Ossetia–Alania bears this name:

- Komsomolskoye, Republic of North Ossetia–Alania, a selo in Komsomolsky Rural Okrug of Kirovsky District

=== Novosibirsk Oblast ===
As of 2012, one rural locality in Novosibirsk Oblast bears this name:

- Komsomolsky, Novosibirsk Oblast, a settlement in Kuybyshevsky District

=== Omsk Oblast ===
As of 2012, two rural localities in Omsk Oblast bear this name:

- Komsomolsky, Omsk Oblast, a settlement in Lesnoy Rural Okrug of Isilkulsky District
- Komsomolskoye, Omsk Oblast, a village in Borisovsky Rural Okrug of Sherbakulsky District

=== Orenburg Oblast ===
As of 2012, four rural localities in Orenburg Oblast bear this name:

- Komsomolsky, Adamovsky District, Orenburg Oblast, a settlement in Komsomolsky Selsoviet of Adamovsky District
- Komsomolsky, Alexandrovsky District, Orenburg Oblast, a settlement in Yafarovsky Selsoviet of Alexandrovsky District
- Komsomolsky, Grachyovsky District, Orenburg Oblast, a settlement in Tallinsky Selsoviet of Grachyovsky District
- Komsomolsky, Kvarkensky District, Orenburg Oblast, a settlement in Briyentsky Selsoviet of Kvarkensky District

=== Oryol Oblast ===
As of 2012, one rural locality in Oryol Oblast bears this name:

- Komsomolsky, Oryol Oblast, a settlement in Kozminsky Selsoviet of Livensky District

=== Perm Krai ===
As of 2012, two rural localities in Perm Krai bear this name:

- Komsomolsky, Kungursky District, Perm Krai, a settlement in Kungursky District
- Komsomolsky, Yurlinsky District, Perm Krai, a settlement in Yurlinsky District

=== Rostov Oblast ===
As of 2012, three rural localities in Rostov Oblast bear this name:

- Komsomolsky, Kasharsky District, Rostov Oblast, a settlement in Fomino-Svechnikovskoye Rural Settlement of Kasharsky District
- Komsomolsky, Morozovsky District, Rostov Oblast, a settlement in Shiroko-Atamanovskoye Rural Settlement of Morozovsky District
- Komsomolsky, Zernogradsky District, Rostov Oblast, a settlement under the administrative jurisdiction of Zernogradskoye Urban Settlement in Zernogradsky District

=== Ryazan Oblast ===
As of 2012, one rural locality in Ryazan Oblast bears this name:

- Komsomolsky, Ryazan Oblast, a settlement in Pionersky Rural Okrug of Rybnovsky District

=== Samara Oblast ===
As of 2012, two rural localities in Samara Oblast bear this name:

- Komsomolsky, Borsky District, Samara Oblast, a settlement in Borsky District
- Komsomolsky, Kinelsky District, Samara Oblast, a settlement in Kinelsky District

=== Saratov Oblast ===
As of 2012, seven rural localities in Saratov Oblast bear this name:

- Komsomolsky, Bazarno-Karabulaksky District, Saratov Oblast, a settlement in Bazarno-Karabulaksky District
- Komsomolsky, Dergachyovsky District, Saratov Oblast, a settlement in Dergachyovsky District
- Komsomolsky, Ozinsky District, Saratov Oblast, a khutor in Ozinsky District
- Komsomolsky, Petrovsky District, Saratov Oblast, a settlement in Petrovsky District
- Komsomolskoye, Arkadaksky District, Saratov Oblast, a settlement in Arkadaksky District
- Komsomolskoye, Balakovsky District, Saratov Oblast, a selo in Balakovsky District
- Komsomolskoye, Krasnokutsky District, Saratov Oblast, a selo in Krasnokutsky District

=== Sverdlovsk Oblast ===
As of 2012, one rural locality in Sverdlovsk Oblast bears this name:

- Komsomolsky, Sverdlovsk Oblast, a settlement in Chupinsky Selsoviet of Talitsky District

=== Tula Oblast ===
As of 2012, two rural localities in Tula Oblast bear this name:

- Komsomolsky, Kireyevsky District, Tula Oblast, a settlement under the administrative jurisdiction of Lipki Town Under District Jurisdiction in Kireyevsky District
- Komsomolsky, Uzlovsky District, Tula Oblast, a settlement in Partizanskaya Rural Administration of Uzlovsky District

=== Tver Oblast ===
As of 2012, two rural localities in Tver Oblast bear this name:

- Komsomolsky, Firovsky District, Tver Oblast, a settlement in Rozhdestvenskoye Rural Settlement of Firovsky District
- Komsomolsky, Kalininsky District, Tver Oblast, a settlement in Verkhnevolzhskoye Rural Settlement of Kalininsky District

=== Tyumen Oblast ===
As of 2012, four rural localities in Tyumen Oblast bear this name:

- Komsomolsky, Golyshmanovsky District, Tyumen Oblast, a settlement in Khmelevsky Rural Okrug of Golyshmanovsky District
- Komsomolsky, Vagaysky District, Tyumen Oblast, a settlement in Pervomaysky Rural Okrug of Vagaysky District
- Komsomolsky, Zavodoukovsky District, Tyumen Oblast, a settlement in Zavodoukovsky District
- Komsomolskaya, Tyumen Oblast, a village in Desyatovsky Rural Okrug of Ishimsky District

=== Volgograd Oblast ===
As of 2012, three rural localities in Volgograd Oblast bear this name:

- Komsomolsky, Kalachyovsky District, Volgograd Oblast, a settlement in Sovetsky Selsoviet of Kalachyovsky District
- Komsomolsky, Novonikolayevsky District, Volgograd Oblast, a settlement in Komsomolsky Selsoviet of Novonikolayevsky District
- Komsomolsky, Pallasovsky District, Volgograd Oblast, a settlement in Komsomolsky Selsoviet of Pallasovsky District

=== Vologda Oblast ===
As of 2012, one rural locality in Vologda Oblast bears this name:

- Komsomolsky, Vologda Oblast, a settlement in Minkovsky Selsoviet of Babushkinsky District

=== Voronezh Oblast ===
As of 2012, five rural localities in Voronezh Oblast bear this name:

- Komsomolsky, Buturlinovsky District, Voronezh Oblast, a settlement under the administrative jurisdiction of Nizhnekislyayskoye Urban Settlement in Buturlinovsky District
- Komsomolsky, Ramonsky District, Voronezh Oblast, a settlement in Komsomolskoye Rural Settlement of Ramonsky District
- Komsomolsky, Talovsky District, Voronezh Oblast, a settlement in Alexandrovskoye Rural Settlement of Talovsky District
- Komsomolskoye, Ertilsky District, Voronezh Oblast, a settlement in Pervomayskoye Rural Settlement of Ertilsky District
- Komsomolskoye, Olkhovatsky District, Voronezh Oblast, a settlement in Lisichanskoye Rural Settlement of Olkhovatsky District

=== Zabaykalsky Krai ===
As of 2012, one rural locality in Zabaykalsky Krai bears this name:

- Komsomolskoye, Zabaykalsky Krai, a selo in Chernyshevsky District

== Renamed localities ==
- Komsomolsky, name of the town of Yugorsk in Khanty–Mansi Autonomous Okrug before 1992
- Komsomolskoye, name of 3-go otdeleniya plemsovkhoza "Pobeda Oktyabrya", a settlement in Martynovskoye Rural Settlement of Paninsky District in Voronezh Oblast, before March 2013

== Alternative names ==
- Komsomolsky, alternative name of Komsomolets, a settlement in Krasnoarmeysky Rural Okrug of Yeysky District in Krasnodar Krai; 46°35′N 38°16′E
- Komsomolskaya, alternative name of Prikumsky, a settlement in Prikumskaya Rural Administration of Chernozemelsky District in the Republic of Kalmykia; 45°16′N 45°50′E
- Komsomolskaya, alternative name of Molodyozhny, a settlement in Chernigovsky Rural Okrug of Belorechensky District in Krasnodar Krai; 44°41′N 39°41′E
