= Kazantsevo =

Kazantsevo (Russian: Каза́нцево) is the name of several rural localities in Russia.

== Altai Krai ==
As of 2010, four rural localities in Altai Krai bear this name:

- Kazantsevo, Kuryinsky District, Altai Krai, a selo in Kuryinsky District
- Kazantsevo, Romanovsky District, Altai Krai, a selo in Romanovsky District
- Kazantsevo, Talmensky District, Altai Krai, a selo in Talmensky District
- Kazantsevo, Zarinsky District, Altai Krai, a settlement in Zarinsky District

== Chelyabinsk Oblast ==
As of 2009, one rural locality in Chelyabinsk Oblast bears this name:

- Kazantsevo, Chelyabinsk Oblast, a village in Sosnovsky District

== Krasnoyarsk Krai ==
As of 2009, two rural localities in Krasnoyarsk Krai bear this name:

- Kazantsevo, Shushensky District, Krasnoyarsk Krai, a selo in Shushensky District
- Kazantsevo, Taymyrsky Dolgano-Nenetsky District, Krasnoyarsk Krai, a settlement in Taymyrsky Dolgano-Nenetsky District

== Kurgan Oblast ==
As of 2008, one rural locality in Kurgan Oblast bears this name:

- Kazantsevo, Kurgan Oblast, a village in Chastoozersky District

== Nizhny Novgorod Oblast ==
As of 2010, one rural locality in Nizhny Novgorod Oblast bears this name:

- Kazantsevo, Nizhny Novgorod Oblast, a village in Koverninsky District

== Novosibirsk Oblast ==
As of 2009, one rural locality in Novosibirsk Oblast bears this name:

- Kazantsevo, Novosibirsk Oblast, a village in Barabinsky District

== Perm Krai ==
As of 2009, one rural locality in Perm Krai bears this name:

- Kazantsevo, Perm Krai, a village in Chernushinsky District

== See also ==
- Kazantsev
