= Novotroitsk (disambiguation) =

Novotroitsk is a town in Orenburg Oblast, Russia.

Novotroitsk may also refer to:

== Places in Russia ==
- Novotroitsk, Karmaskalinsky District, Republic of Bashkortostan, a rural locality in Bashkortostan
- Novotroitsk, Rodinsky District, Altai Krai, a rural locality in Altai Krai
- Novotroitsk, Sharansky District, Republic of Bashkortostan, a rural locality in Bashkortostan
- Novotroitsk, Talmensky District, Altai Krai, a rural locality in Altai Krai
- Novotroitsk, Yanaulsky District, Republic of Bashkortostan, a rural locality in Bashkortostan
- Novo-Troitsk, a rural locality in Altai Krai

== Other ==
- FC Nosta Novotroitsk, a Russian football club
- FC Tavriya Novotroitsk, a Ukrainian football club
- The Russian-language name for Novotroitske, a town in Kherson Oblast

== See also ==
- Novotroitsky
