= Mormyshi =

Mormyshi Мормыши
- Selo
- Location within Altai Krai Location within Russia
- Coordinates: 52°27′N 81°12′E
- Country: Russia
- Region: Altai Krai
- District: Romanovsky District
- Time zone: UTC+7:00

Mormyshi (Russian: Мормыши) is a rural locality (a selo) and the administrative center of Mormyshansky Selsoviet, Romanovsky District, Altai Krai, Russia. The population was 149 as of 2013. There is 1 street.

== Geography ==
Mormyshi is located on the Gorkoye Lake, 29 kilometers (18 mi) south of Romanovo (the district's administrative centre) by road. Buranovka is the nearest rural locality.
