= Komsomolets (rural locality) =

Komsomolets (Russian: Комсомолец) is the name of several rural localities in Russia.

== Russian localities ==
- Komsomolets, Altai Krai, a settlement in Nalobikhinsky Selsoviet of Kosikhinsky District; 53°10′N 84°33′E
- Komsomolets, Krasnodar Krai, a settlement in Krasnoarmeysky Rural Okrug of Yeysky District; 46°35′N 38°16′E
- Komsomolets, Orenburg Oblast, a settlement in Toksky Selsoviet of Krasnogvardeysky District
- Komsomolets, Stavropol Krai, a settlement in Komsomolsky Selsoviet of Kirovsky District
- Komsomolets, Republic of Tatarstan, a settlement in Tukayevsky District
- Komsomolets, Udmurt Republic, a village in Komsomolsky Selsoviet of Igrinsky District
- Komsomolets, Volgograd Oblast, a village in Komsomolsky Selsoviet of Nikolayevsky District
- Komsomolets, Voronezh Oblast, a settlement in Butyrskoye Rural Settlement of Repyovsky District

== Alternative names ==
- Komsomolets, alternative name of Komsomolsky, a settlement in Shishinskaya Rural Territory of Topkinsky District; 55°22′N 85°10′E
- Komsomolets, alternative name of Komsomolskoye, a village in Kizilyurtovsky District; 43°12′N 46°54′E

== See also ==
- Komsomolsk, Russia
- Komsomolsky, Russia
