= Sidorovka, Romanovsky District, Altai Krai =

Sidorovka Сидоровка
- Selo
- Location within Altai Krai Location within Russia
- Coordinates: 52°32′N 80°45′E
- Country: Russia
- Region: Altai Krai
- District: Romanovsky District
- Time zone: UTC+7:00

Sidorovka (Russian: Сидоровка) is a rural locality (a selo) and the administrative center of Sidorovsky Selsoviet, Romanovsky District, Altai Krai, Russia. The population was 1,287 as of 2013. There are 8 streets.

== Geography ==
Sidorovka is located 38 km west of Romanovo (the district's administrative centre) by road. Zakladnoye is the nearest rural locality.
