= Sibirskiye Ogni =

Sibirskiye Ogni Сибирские Огни
- Settlement
- Location within Altai Krai Location within Russia
- Coordinates: 53°18′N 83°02′E
- Country: Russia
- Region: Altai Krai
- District: Pavlovsky District
- Time zone: UTC+7:00

Sibirskiye Ogni (Russian: Сибирские Огни) is a rural locality (a settlement) and the administrative center of Pavlozavodsky Selsoviet, Pavlovsky District, Altai Krai, Russia. The population was 1,097 as of 2013. There are 14 streets.

== Geography ==
Sibirskiye Ogni is located 8 km southeast of Pavlovsk (the district's administrative centre) by road. Pavlovsk is the nearest rural locality.
