= Stukovo =

Stukovo Стуково
- Selo
- Location within Altai Krai Location within Russia
- Coordinates: 53°12′N 83°20′E
- Country: Russia
- Region: Altai Krai
- District: Pavlovsky District
- Time zone: UTC+7:00

Stukovo (Russian: Стуково) is a rural locality (a selo) and the administrative center of Stukovsky Selsoviet, Pavlovsky District, Altai Krai, Russia. The population was 1,222 as of 2013. There are 8 streets.

== Geography ==
Stukovo is located 35 km southeast of Pavlovsk (the district's administrative centre) by road. Sarai is the nearest rural locality.
