= Pervomaysky, Romanovsky District, Altai Krai =

Pervomaysky Первомайский
- Settlement
- Location within Altai Krai Location within Russia
- Coordinates: 52°46′N 80°55′E
- Country: Russia
- Region: Altai Krai
- District: Romanovsky District
- Time zone: UTC+7:00

Pervomaysky (Russian: Первомайский) is a rural locality (a settlement) in Tambovsky Selsoviet, Romanovsky District, Altai Krai, Russia. The population was 40 as of 2013. There are 3 streets.

== Geography ==
Pervomaysky is located 38 km northwest of Romanovo (the district's administrative centre) by road. Zavyalovo is the nearest rural locality.
