= Zakladnoye =

Zakladnoye Закладное
- Selo
- Location within Altai Krai Location within Russia
- Coordinates: 52°35′N 80°59′E
- Country: Russia
- Region: Altai Krai
- District: Romanovsky District
- Time zone: UTC+7:00

Zakladnoye (Russian: Закладное) is a rural locality (a selo) and the administrative center of Zakladinsky Selsoviet, Romanovsky District, Altai Krai, Russia. The population was 803 as of 2013. There are 12 streets.

== Geography ==
Zakladnoye is located 20 km southwest of Romanovo (the district's administrative centre) by road. Tambovsky is the nearest rural locality.
