= Pervomaysky, Altai Krai =

Pervomaysky Первомайский
- Settlement
- Location within Altai Krai Location within Russia
- Coordinates: 52°55′N 81°39′E
- Country: Russia
- Region: Altai Krai
- District: Mamontovsky District
- Time zone: UTC+7:00

Pervomaysky (Russian: Первомайский) is a rural locality (a settlement) and the administrative center of Timiryazevsky Selsoviet of Mamontovsky District, Altai Krai, Russia. The population was 666 in 2016. There are 11 streets.

== Geography ==
Pervomaysky is located 36 km north of Mamontovo (the district's administrative centre) by road. Komsomolsky is the nearest rural locality.
