= Dubrovino =

Dubrovino Дубровино
- Selo
- Location within Altai Krai Location within Russia
- Coordinates: 52°40′N 80°52′E
- Country: Russia
- Region: Altai Krai
- District: Romanovsky District
- Time zone: UTC+7:00

Dubrovino (Russian: Дубровино) is a rural locality (a selo) and the administrative center of Dubrovinsky Selsoviet, Romanovsky District, Altai Krai, Russia. The population was 479 as of 2013. There are 5 streets.

== Geography ==
Dubrovino is located 40 km northwest of Romanovo (the district's administrative centre) by road. Tambovsky is the nearest rural locality.
