= Buranovka, Romanovsky District, Altai Krai =

Buranovka Бурановка
- Settlement
- Location within Altai Krai Location within Russia
- Coordinates: 52°26′N 81°09′E
- Country: Russia
- Region: Altai Krai
- District: Romanovsky District
- Time zone: UTC+7:00

Buranovka (Russian: Бурановка) is a rural locality (a settlement) in Mormyshansky Selsoviet, Romanovsky District, Altai Krai, Russia. The population was 241 as of 2013. There are 3 streets.

== Geography ==
Buranovka is located 33 km southwest of Romanovo (the district's administrative centre) by road. Ilyinsky is the nearest rural locality.
