= Cheryomno-Podgornoye =

Cheryomno-Podgornoye Черёмно-Подгорное
- Selo
- Location within Altai Krai Location within Russia
- Coordinates: 53°27′N 83°06′E
- Country: Russia
- Region: Altai Krai
- District: Pavlovsky District
- Time zone: UTC+7:00

Cheryomno-Podgornoye (Russian: Черёмно-Подгорное) is a rural locality (a selo) in Yeluninsky Selsoviet, Pavlovsky District, Altai Krai, Russia. The population was 270 as of 2013. There are 2 streets.

== Geography ==
Cheryomno-Podgornoye is located on the Ob River, 24 km northeast of Pavlovsk (the district's administrative centre) by road. Yelunino is the nearest rural locality.
