= Mamontovo =

Mamontovo (Russian: Мамонтово) is the name of several rural localities in Russia:

- Mamontovo, Mamontovsky District, Altai Krai, a selo in Mamontovsky Selsoviet of Mamontovsky District of Altai Krai
- Mamontovo, Novichikhinsky District, Altai Krai, a settlement in Novichikhinsky Selsoviet of Novichikhinsky District of Altai Krai
- Mamontovo, Rubtsovsky District, Altai Krai, a station in Tishinsky Selsoviet of Rubtsovsky District of Altai Krai
- Mamontovo, Moscow Oblast, a selo in Mamontovskoye Rural Settlement of Noginsky District of Moscow Oblast
- Mamontovo, Nizhny Novgorod Oblast, a selo in Mezhdurechensky Selsoviet of Sokolsky District of Nizhny Novgorod Oblast
- Mamontovo, Sosnovsky District, Tambov Oblast, a selo in Otyassky Selsoviet of Sosnovsky District of Tambov Oblast
- Mamontovo, Tokaryovsky District, Tambov Oblast, a selo in Vasilyevsky Selsoviet of Tokaryovsky District of Tambov Oblast
