= Zhuravli, Altai Krai =

Zhuravli Журавли
- Settlement
- Location within Altai Krai Location within Russia
- Coordinates: 52°44′N 81°00′E
- Country: Russia
- Region: Altai Krai
- District: Romanovsky District
- Time zone: UTC+7:00

Zhuravli (Russian: Журавли) is a rural locality (a settlement) in Gilyov-Logovskoy Selsoviet, Romanovsky District, Altai Krai, Russia. The population was 26 as of 2013.

== Geography ==
Zhuravli is located 27 km north of Romanovo (the district's administrative centre) by road. Gilyov-Log is the nearest rural locality.
