= Prutskoy =

Prutskoy Прутской
- Settlement
- Location within Altai Krai Location within Russia
- Coordinates: 53°18′N 83°14′E
- Country: Russia
- Region: Altai Krai
- District: Pavlovsky District
- Time zone: UTC+7:00

Prutskoy (Russian: Прутской) is a rural locality (a settlement) and the administrative center of Prutskoy Selsoviet, Pavlovsky District, Altai Krai, Russia. The population was 2,534 as of 2013. There are 15 streets.

== Geography ==
Prutskoy is located 25 km east of Pavlovsk (the district's administrative centre) by road. Urozhayny is the nearest rural locality.
