= Guseletovo =

Guseletovo Гуселетово
- Selo
- Location within Altai Krai Location within Russia
- Coordinates: 52°33′N 81°22′E
- Country: Russia
- Region: Altai Krai
- District: Romanovsky District
- Time zone: UTC+7:00

Guseletovo (Russian: Гуселетово) is a rural locality (a selo) and the administrative center of Guseletovsky Selsoviet, Romanovsky District, Altai Krai, Russia. The population was 911 as of 2013. There are 6 streets.

== Geography ==
Guseletovo is located near lakes Gorkoye (Chernokurynskoye) and Gorkoye, 14 kilometers (8.7 mi) southeast of Romanovo (the district's administrative centre) by road. Chyornaya Kurya is the nearest rural locality.
