= Rogozikha =

Rogozikha Рогозиха
- Selo
- Location within Altai Krai Location within Russia
- Coordinates: 53°15′N 82°46′E
- Country: Russia
- Region: Altai Krai
- District: Pavlovsky District
- Time zone: UTC+7:00

Rogozikha (Russian: Рогозиха) is a rural locality (a selo) and the administrative center of Rogozikhinsky Selsoviet, Pavlovsky District, Altai Krai, Russia. The population was 915 as of 2013. There are 15 streets.

== Geography ==
Rogozikha is located 18 km southwest of Pavlovsk (the district's administrative centre) by road. Buranovka is the nearest rural locality.
