= Buranovka =

Buranovka Бурановка
- Village
- Location within Altai Krai Location within Russia
- Coordinates: 53°14′N 82°44′E
- Country: Russia
- Region: Altai Krai
- District: Pavlovsky District
- Time zone: UTC+7:00

Buranovka (Russian: Бурановка) is a rural locality (a selo) and the administrative center of Buranovsky Selsoviet of Pavlovsky District, Altai Krai, Russia. The population was 827 in 2016. There are 11 streets.

== Geography ==
Buranovka is located near lake Gorkoye, between the Rogozikha and Kasmala rivers, 20 kilometers (12 mi) southwest of Pavlovsk (the district's administrative centre) by road. Rogozikha is the nearest rural locality.
