= Talmenka =

Talmenka (Russian: Тальменка) is the name of several inhabited localities in Russia.

Urban localities

- Talmenka, Talmensky District, Altai Krai, a work settlement under the administrative jurisdiction of Talmensky Settlement Council in Talmensky District of Altai Krai

Rural localities

- Talmenka, Soloneshensky District, Altai Krai, a selo in Soloneshensky Selsoviet of Soloneshensky District of Altai Krai
- Talmenka, Novosibirsk Oblast, a selo in Iskitimsky District of Novosibirsk Oblast
