= Gilyov-Log =

Gilyov-Log Гилёв-Лог
- Selo
- Location within Altai Krai Location within Russia
- Coordinates: 52°46′N 81°05′E
- Country: Russia
- Region: Altai Krai
- District: Romanovsky District
- Time zone: UTC+7:00

Gilyov-Log (Russian: Гилёв-Лог) is a rural locality (a selo) and the administrative center of Gilyov-Logovskoy Selsoviet, Romanovsky District, Altai Krai, Russia. The population was 846 as of 2013. There are 6 streets.

== Geography ==
Gilyov-Log is located on the Baklanka River, 20 km north of Romanovo (the district's administrative centre) by road. Zhuravli is the nearest rural locality.
