= Arbuzovka, Kolyvansky Selsoviet, Pavlovsky District, Altai Krai =

Arbuzovka Арбузовка
- Selo
- Location within Altai Krai Location within Russia
- Coordinates: 53°03′N 82°56′E
- Country: Russia
- Region: Altai Krai
- District: Pavlovsky District
- Time zone: UTC+7:00

Arbuzovka (Russian: Арбузовка) is a rural locality (a selo) in Kolyvansky Selsoviet, Pavlovsky District, Altai Krai, Russia. The population was 270 as of 2013. There are 2 streets.

== Geography ==
Arbuzovka is located 42 km south of Pavlovsk (the district's administrative centre) by road. Kolyvanskoye is the nearest rural locality.
