= Chernopyatovo =

Chernopyatovo Чернопятово
- Selo
- Location within Altai Krai Location within Russia
- Coordinates: 53°23′N 83°10′E
- Country: Russia
- Region: Altai Krai
- District: Pavlovsky District
- Time zone: UTC+7:00

Chernopyatovo (Russian: Чернопятово) is a rural locality (a selo) and the administrative center of Chernopyatovsky Selsoviet, Pavlovsky District, Altai Krai, Russia. As of 2013, the population was 620. The locality has six streets.

== Geography ==
Chernopyatovo is located 21 km northeast of Pavlovsk, the district's administrative centre, by road. The nearest rural locality is Nagorny.
