= Granovka =

Granovka Грановка
- Village
- Location within Altai Krai Location within Russia
- Coordinates: 52°24′N 80°58′E
- Country: Russia
- Region: Altai Krai
- District: Romanovsky District
- Time zone: UTC+7:00

Granovka (Russian: Грановка) is a rural locality (a selo) and the administrative center of Grano-Mayakovsky Selsoviet of Romanovsky District, Altai Krai, Russia. The population was 371 in 2016. There are two streets.

== Geography ==
Granovka is located 39 km southwest of Romanovo (the district's administrative centre) by road. Selivyorstovo is the nearest rural locality.
