= Kasmala =

Kasmala Касмала
- Selo
- Location within Altai Krai Location within Russia
- Coordinates: 53°26′N 83°14′E
- Country: Russia
- Region: Altai Krai
- District: Pavlovsky District
- Time zone: UTC+7:00

Kasmala (Russian: Касмала) is a rural locality (a selo) in Chernopyatovsky Selsoviet, Pavlovsky District, Altai Krai, Russia. The population was 52 as of 2013. There are 3 streets.

== Geography ==
Kasmala is located by the banks of the Kasmala near its mouth in the Ob, 28 km (17 mi) northeast of Pavlovsk (the district's administrative centre) by road. Nagorny is the nearest rural locality.
