= Kadnikovo =

Kadnikovo Кадниково
- Selo
- Location within Altai Krai Location within Russia
- Coordinates: 52°51′N 81°54′E
- Country: Russia
- Region: Altai Krai
- District: Mamontovsky District
- Time zone: UTC+7:00

Kadnikovo (Russian: Кадниково) is a rural locality (a selo) and the administrative center of Kadnikovsky Selsoviet, Mamontovsky District, Altai Krai, Russia. The population was 801 as of 2013. There are 9 streets.

== Geography ==
Kadnikovo is located 30 km northeast of Mamontovo (the district's administrative centre) by road. Bukanskoye is the nearest rural locality.
