= Shakhi, Russia =

Shakhi Шахи
- Village
- Location within Altai Krai Location within Russia
- Coordinates: 53°20′N 83°21′E
- Country: Russia
- Region: Altai Krai
- District: Pavlovsky District
- Time zone: UTC+7:00

Shakhi (Russian: Шахи) is a rural locality (a selo) and the administrative center of Shakhovsky Selsoviet of Pavlovsky District, Altai Krai, Russia. The population was 1,745 in 2016. There are 20 streets.

== Geography ==
Shakhi is located 33 km east of Pavlovsk (the district's administrative centre) by road. Novomikhaylovka is the nearest rural locality.
