= Borovikovo =

Borovikovo Боровиково
- Selo
- Location within Altai Krai Location within Russia
- Coordinates: 53°24′N 82°51′E
- Country: Russia
- Region: Altai Krai
- District: Pavlovsky District
- Time zone: UTC+7:00

Borovikovo (Russian: Боровиково) is a rural locality (a selo) in Pavlovsky Selsoviet, Pavlovsky District, Altai Krai, Russia. The population was 350 as of 2013. There are 6 streets.

== Geography ==
Borovikovo is located 13 km northwest of Pavlovsk (the district's administrative centre) by road. Sibirskiye Ogni is the nearest rural locality.
