= Yermachikha =

Yermachikha Ермачиха
- Village
- Location within Altai Krai Location within Russia
- Coordinates: 53°02′N 81°37′E
- Country: Russia
- Region: Altai Krai
- District: Mamontovsky District
- Time zone: UTC+7:00

Yermachikha (Russian: Ермачиха) is a rural locality (a selo) and the administrative center of Mamontovsky District, Altai Krai, Russia. The population was 394 in 2014. There are 7 streets.

== Geography ==
Yermachikha is located on the Yermachikha River, 53 km north of Mamontovo (the district's administrative centre) by road. Korchino is the nearest rural locality.
