= Bolshoye Ostrovnoye =

Salt lake in Altai Krai, Russia

- Большое Островное
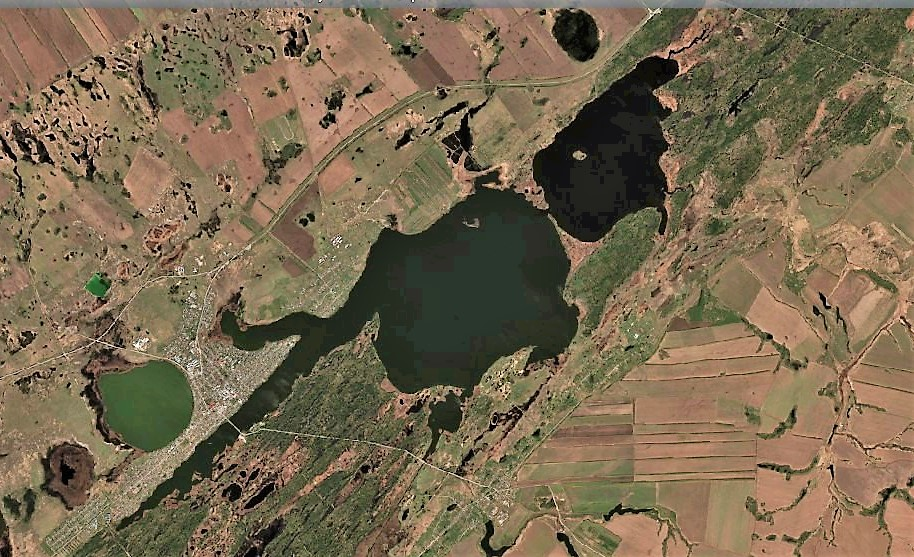
- Sentinel-2 image of the lake in May

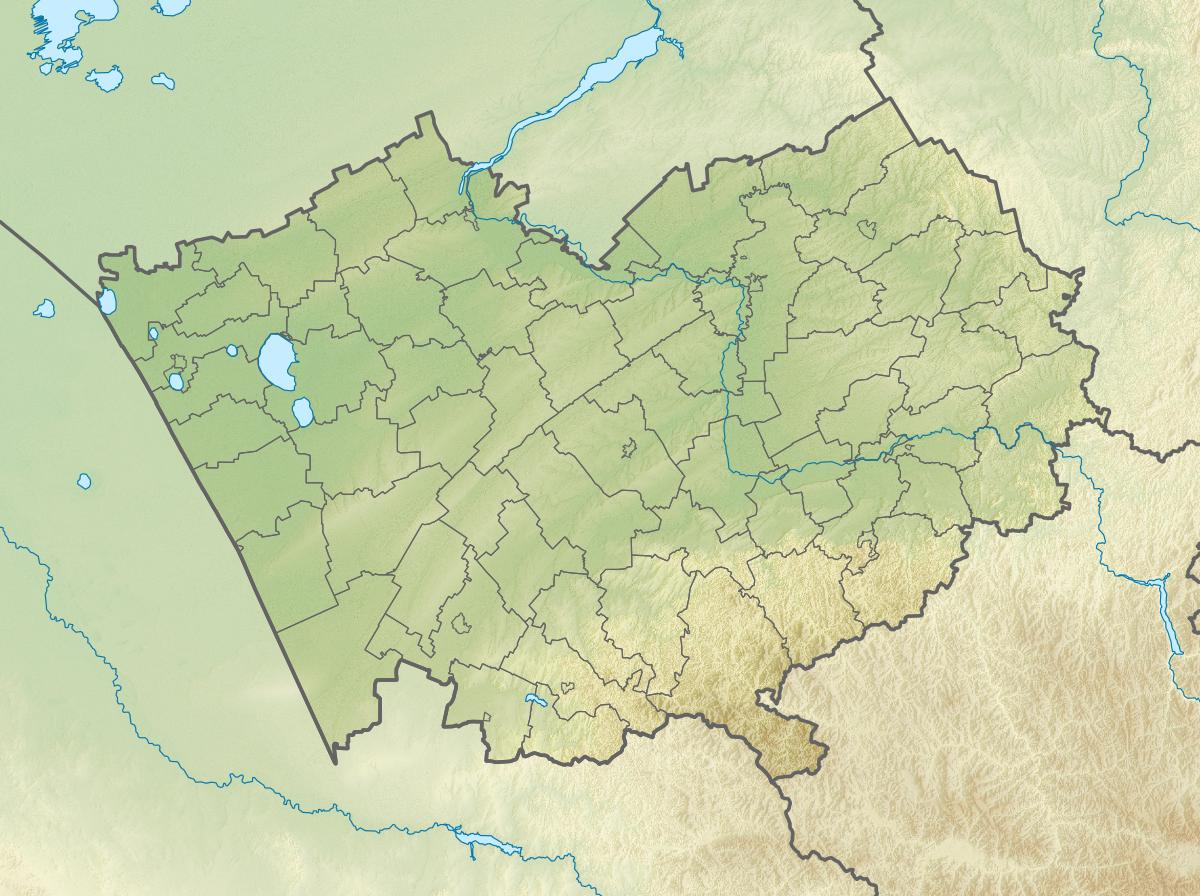
- Location within Altai Krai Location within Russia
- Location: Ob Plateau; West Siberian Plain
- Coordinates: 52°43′32″N 81°42′17″E
- Primary outflows: Kasmala
- Catchment area: 892 square kilometers (344 sq mi)
- Basin countries: Russia
- Max. length: 16.6 kilometers (10.3 mi)
- Max. width: 4.1 kilometers (2.5 mi)
- Surface area: 28.6 square kilometers (11.0 sq mi)
- Average depth: 1.8 meters (5 ft 11 in)
- Max. depth: 5.6 meters (18 ft)
- Residence time: UTC+6
- Surface elevation: 206 meters (676 ft)
- Islands: Berezovy Island
- Settlements: Mamontovo

Bolshoye Ostrovnoye (Russian: Большое Островное) is a salt lake in Mamontovsky District, Altai Krai, Russian Federation.

The lake lies roughly in the middle of the Krai. Mamontovo, Ostrovnoye and Malye Butyrki are located close to the lakeshore. The nearest towns are Bukanskoye, near the northern end, and Kazantsevo 11 kilometers (6.8 mi) to the southwest.

== Geography ==
Bolshoye Ostrovnoye is an endorheic lake that lies within one of the wide ravines of glacial origin cutting diagonally across the Ob Plateau. The lake has an irregular shape, stretching roughly from northeast to southwest for over 18 kilometers (11 mi). It has a very narrow southern section, and the broader section has two opposing landspits in the middle that almost divide the lake in two. There is an island near the northern shore. The bottom of the lake is sandy and most of the shore is low and swampy. The lake basin is well defined, located in the ancient valley of the Kasmala River. A southern branch at the head of the Kasmala flows out of the lake.

The northern end of lake Gorkoye (Chernokurynskoye) is located 12 kilometers (7.5 mi) to the southwest and lake Gorkoye (Romanovsky District) 11 kilometers (6.8 mi) slightly to the WNW. Lake Zerkalnoye lies 20 kilometers (12 mi) to the southeast and Mostovoye 59 kilometers (37 mi) to the northwest.

== Flora and fauna ==
The ribbon pine forest characteristic of the Ob Plateau flanks the eastern side of Bolshoye Ostrovnoye. Bulrushes and willows grow by the shore. The water is only slightly saline and fish were once abundant in the lake. Pike, crucian carp and roach are still to be found in its waters, however, in recent decades species such as tench, peled and perch have disappeared owing to eutrophication.

At the time of the USSR there used to be a fish processing plant by the lakeshore, where fish caught in the lake was smoked. The facility was abandoned about 25 years ago, but currently there are plans to revive it and stock the lake with fish.

== See also ==
- List of lakes of Russia
