= Novotroitsk, Talmensky District, Altai Krai =

Novotroitsk Новотроицк
- Selo
- Location within Altai Krai Location within Russia
- Coordinates: 53°54′N 83°44′E
- Country: Russia
- Region: Altai Krai
- District: Talmensky District
- Time zone: UTC+7:00

Novotroitsk (Russian: Новотроицк) is a rural locality (a selo) and the administrative center of Novotroitsky Selsoviet, Talmensky District, Altai Krai, Russia. The population was 571 as of 2013. There are 12 streets.

== Geography ==
Novotroitsk is located 18 km northeast of Talmenka (the district's administrative centre) by road. Taskayevo is the nearest rural locality.
