= Kolyvansky =

Kolyvansky (masculine), Kolyvanskaya (feminine), or Kolyvanskoye (neuter) may refer to:

- Kolyvansky District, a district of Novosibirsk Oblast, Russia
- Kolyvanskoye, a rural locality (a selo) in Altai Krai, Russia
