= Gorkoye (Chernokurynskoye) =

Salt lake in Altai Krai, Russia

- Горькое
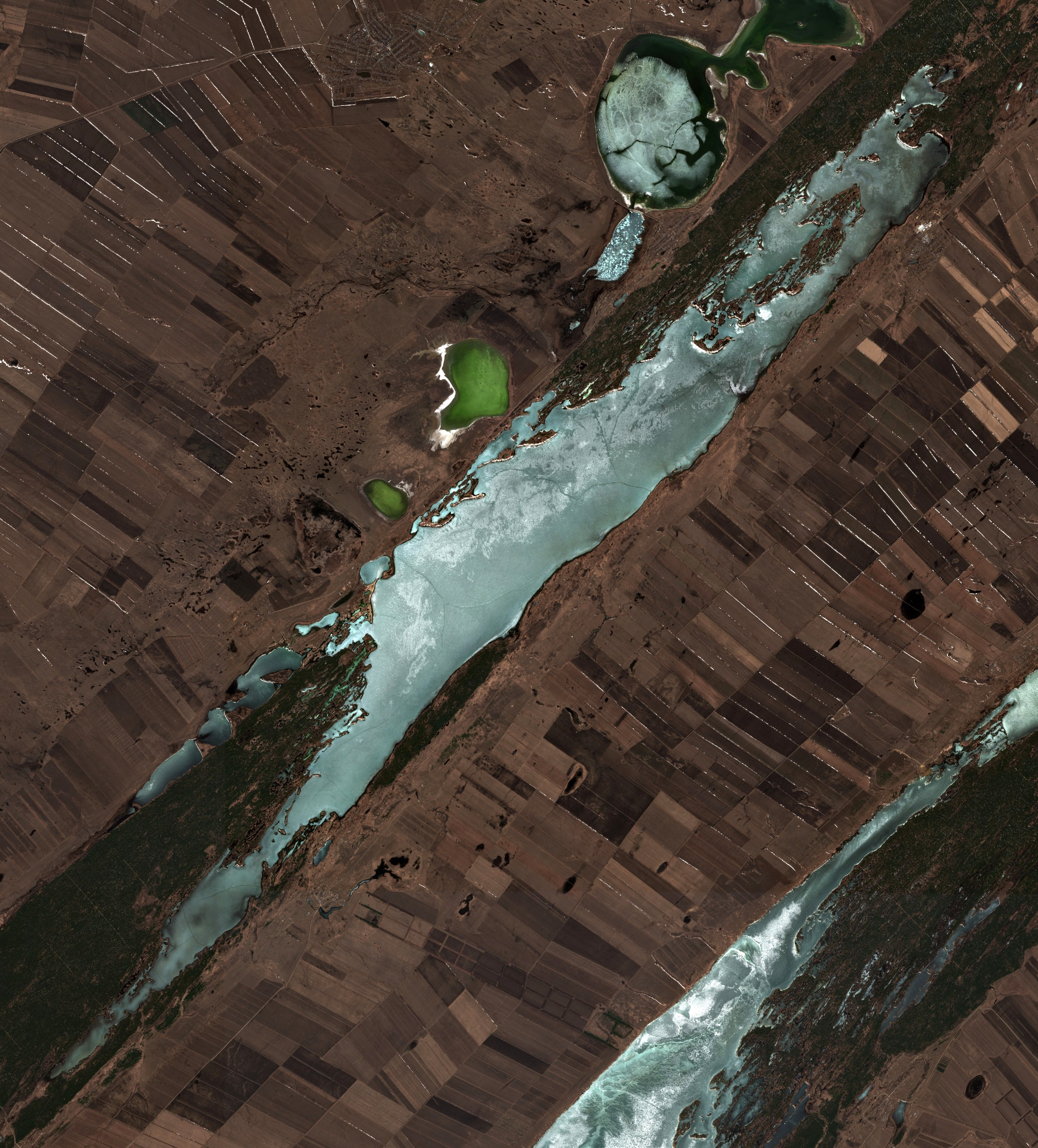
- Sentinel-2 image of the still frozen lake in April with lake Gorkoye (Romanovsky District) above and Gorkoye (Novichikhinsky District) below.

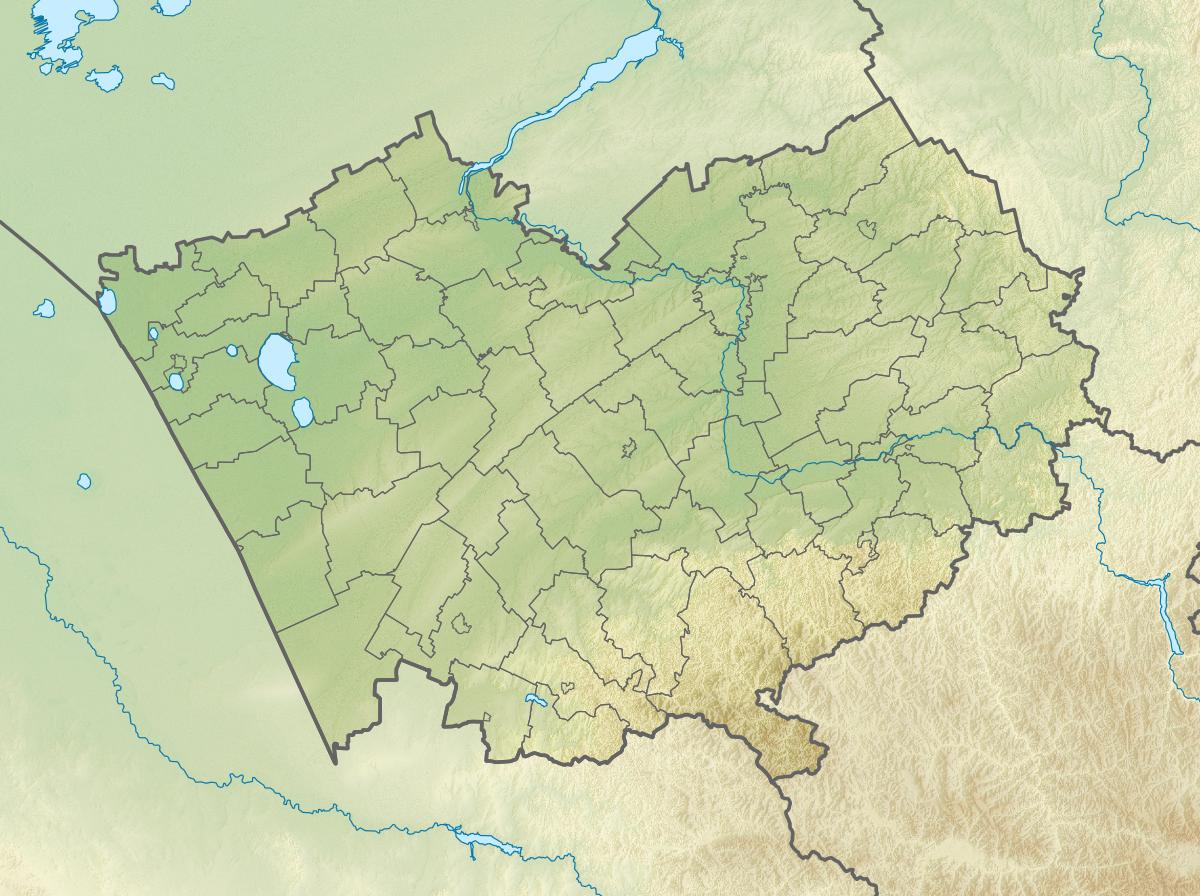
- Location within Altai Krai Location within Russia
- Location: Ob Plateau; West Siberian Plain
- Coordinates: 52°28′30″N 81°19′30″E
- Type: endorheic
- Catchment area: 4,030 square kilometers (1,560 sq mi)
- Basin countries: Russia
- Max. length: 47 kilometers (29 mi)
- Max. width: 4.8 kilometers (3.0 mi)
- Surface area: 75.1 square kilometers (29.0 sq mi)
- Max. depth: 7.2 meters (24 ft)
- Residence time: UTC+6
- Surface elevation: 199 meters (653 ft)
- Islands: numerous

Gorkoye (Russian: Горькое), also known as "Chernokurynskoye" and "Gorkoye Bolshoye", is a salt lake in Mamontovsky, Novichikhinsky and Romanovsky districts, Altai Krai, Russian Federation.

The lake lies roughly in the middle of the Krai. The nearest towns are Mormyshi close to the lakeshore, Buranovka to the west and Guseletovo near the northern end.

== Geography ==
With a length of 47 kilometers (29 mi), Gorkoye is one of the longest lakes in Altai Krai. It lies in one of the wide ravines of glacial origin that cut diagonally across the Ob Plateau, upstream from the sources of the Kasmala river. The lake has an elongated shape, stretching roughly from northeast to southwest with a northern section reaching a width of almost 5 kilometers (3.1 mi) and a very narrow southern section. The water is saline and the shores are flat.

Lake Bolshoye Ostrovnoye is located in the same trench 14 kilometers (8.7 mi) to the northeast, and small lake Seleznevo-Borovskoye, at the head of the Kasmala river, a little further to the northeast. Gorkoye (Romanovsky District) lies 2 kilometers (1.2 mi) to the north of the northern end, Gorkoye (Novichikhinsky District) 13 kilometers (8.1 mi) to the southeast and Lake Kuchuk 87 kilometers (54 mi) to the northwest.

== See also ==
- List of lakes of Russia
