= Komsomolsky, Pavlovsky District, Altai Krai =

Komsomolsky Комсомольский
- Selo
- Location within Altai Krai Location within Russia
- Coordinates: 53°15′N 83°23′E
- Country: Russia
- Region: Altai Krai
- District: Pavlovsky District
- Time zone: UTC+7:00

Komsomolsky (Russian: Комсомольский) is a rural locality (a selo) and the administrative center of Komsomolsky Selsoviet, Pavlovsky District, Altai Krai, Russia. The population was 1,892 as of 2013. There are 18 streets.

== Geography ==
Komsomolsky is located 37 km east of Pavlovsk (the district's administrative centre) by road. Novye Zori is the nearest rural locality.
