= Kazantsevo, Talmensky District, Altai Krai =

Kazantsevo Казанцево
- Village
- Location within Altai Krai Location within Russia
- Coordinates: 54°01′N 83°17′E
- Country: Russia
- Region: Altai Krai
- District: Talmensky District
- Time zone: UTC+7:00

Kazantsevo (Russian: Казанцево) is a rural locality (a selo) and the administrative center of Kazanskoye Rural Settlement of Talmensky District, Altai Krai, Russia. The population was 128 in 2016. There are 10 streets.

== Geography ==
Kazantsevo is located 42 km northwest of Talmenka (the district's administrative centre) by road. Malinovka is the nearest rural locality.
