= Kolyvanskoye =

Kolyvanskoye Колыванское
- Selo
- Location within Altai Krai Location within Russia
- Coordinates: 53°01′N 82°53′E
- Country: Russia
- Region: Altai Krai
- District: Pavlovsky District
- Time zone: UTC+7:00

Kolyvanskoye (Russian: Колыванское) is a rural locality (a selo) and the administrative center of Kolyvansky Selsoviet, Pavlovsky District, Altai Krai, Russia. The population was 1,449 as of 2013. There are 9 streets.

== Geography ==
Kolyvanskoye is located 47 km south of Pavlovsk (the district's administrative centre) by road. Arbuzovka is the nearest rural locality.
