= Kazantsevo, Romanovsky District, Altai Krai =

Kazantsevo Казанцево
- Village
- Location within Altai Krai Location within Russia
- Coordinates: 52°39′N 81°25′E
- Country: Russia
- Region: Altai Krai
- District: Romanovsky District
- Time zone: UTC+7:00

Kazantsevo (Russian: Казанцево) is a rural locality (a selo) and the administrative center of Kazantsevskoye Rural Settlement of Romanovsky District, Altai Krai, Russia. The population was 283 in 2016. There are 8 streets.

== Geography ==
Kazantsevo is located 18 km northeast of Romanovo (the district's administrative centre) by road. Mamontovo is the nearest rural locality. Salt lake Gorkoye lies close to the southern side of the town.
