= Gorkoye (Romanovsky District) =

Salt lake in Altai Krai, Russia

- Горькое
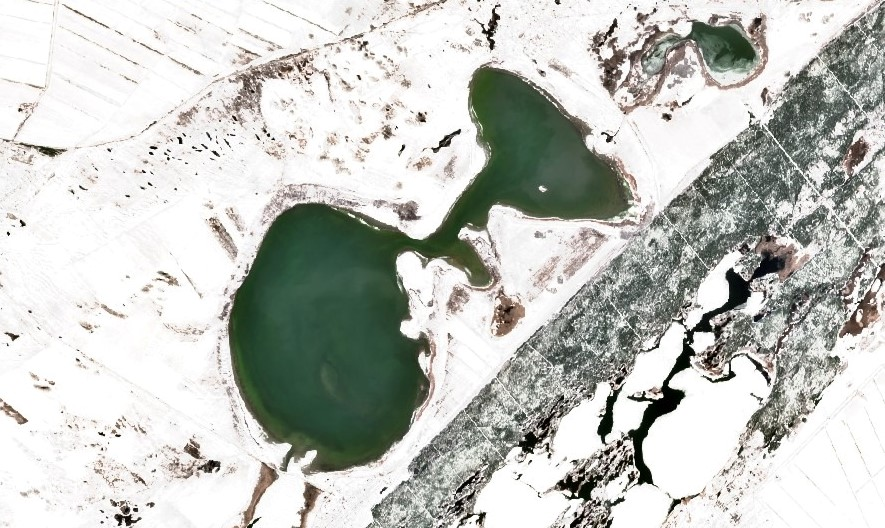
- Sentinel-2 image of the lake in April with part of lake Gorkoye (Chernokurynskoye) below.

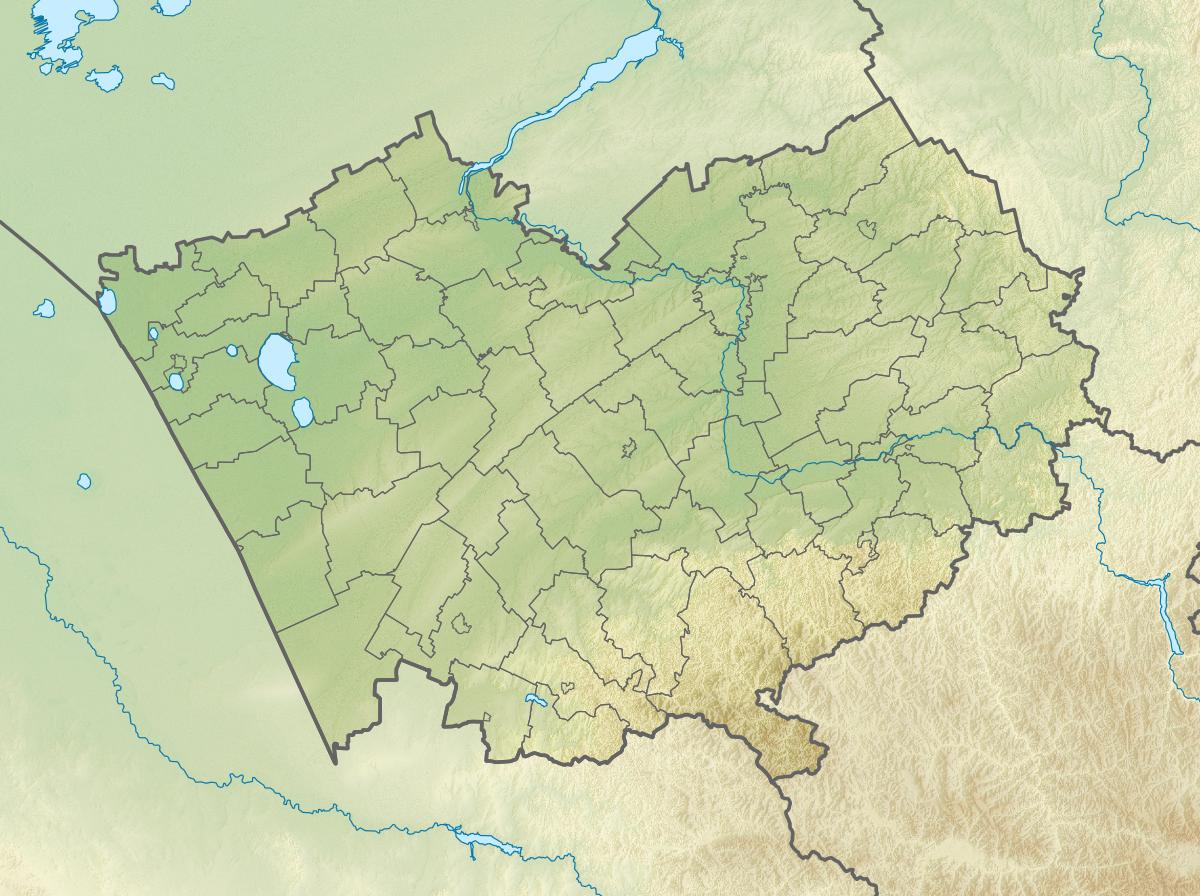
- Location within Altai Krai Location within Russia
- Location: Ob Plateau; West Siberian Plain
- Coordinates: 52°36′01″N 81°22′26″E
- Type: endorheic
- Basin countries: Russia
- Max. length: 10.2 kilometers (6.3 mi)
- Max. width: 4.7 kilometers (2.9 mi)
- Surface area: 23.2 square kilometers (9.0 sq mi)
- Residence time: UTC+6
- Surface elevation: 197 meters (646 ft)

Gorkoye (Russian: Горькое) is a salt lake in Romanovsky District, Altai Krai, Russian Federation.

The lake lies roughly in the middle of the Krai. The nearest towns are Kazantsevo close to the northern lakeshore and Guseletovo near the southern end.

== Geography ==
Gorkoye is an endorheic lake that lies close to the northern edge of one of the wide ravines of glacial origin cutting diagonally across the Ob Plateau. The lake has an hourglass shape, stretching roughly from northeast to southwest for over 10 kilometers (6.2 mi). It has a very narrow middle section that almost divides the lake in two, with a northern part that is smaller than the southern one. The lake water is saline and the shores are flat.

The northern shore of lake Gorkoye (Chernokurynskoye) is located 2 kilometers (1.2 mi) to the southeast and lake Bolshoye Ostrovnoye 17 kilometers (11 mi) to the northeast. Lake Mostovoye lies 54 kilometers (34 mi) to the northwest and Lake Kuchuk 98 kilometers (61 mi) to the WNW.

== See also ==
- List of lakes of Russia
