= Komsomolsky, Astrakhan Oblast =

Komsomolsky Комсомольский
- Settlement
- Location within Astrakhan Oblast Location within Russia
- Coordinates: 46°51′N 47°56′E
- Country: Russia
- Region: Astrakhan Oblast
- District: Krasnoyarsky District
- Time zone: UTC+4:00

Komsomolsky (Russian: Комсомольский) is a rural locality (a settlement) in Akhtubinsky Selsoviet, Krasnoyarsky District, Astrakhan Oblast, Russia. The population was 1,175 as of 2010. There are 8 streets.

== Geography ==
It is located on the Akhtuba River, 56 km northwest of Krasny Yar (the district's administrative centre) by road. Vishnevy is the nearest rural locality.
