= Komsomolsky, Krasnoborsky District, Arkhangelsk Oblast =

Komsomolsky Комсомольский
- Settlement
- Location within Arkhangelsk Oblast Location within Russia
- Coordinates: 61°23′N 45°26′E
- Country: Russia
- Region: Arkhangelsk Oblast
- District: Krasnoborsky District
- Time zone: UTC+3:00

Komsomolsky (Russian: Комсомольский) is a rural locality (a settlement) in Alexeyevskoye Rural Settlement of Krasnoborsky District, Arkhangelsk Oblast, Russia. The population was 207 as of 2010. There are 5 streets.

== Geography ==
Komsomolsky is located 37 km southwest of Krasnoborsk (the district's administrative centre) by road. Berezovka is the nearest rural locality.
