= Chernozemelsky District =

Chernozemelsky District Черноземельский район (Russian)
- District

Other transcription(s)
  - Kalmyk: Хар Һазра район
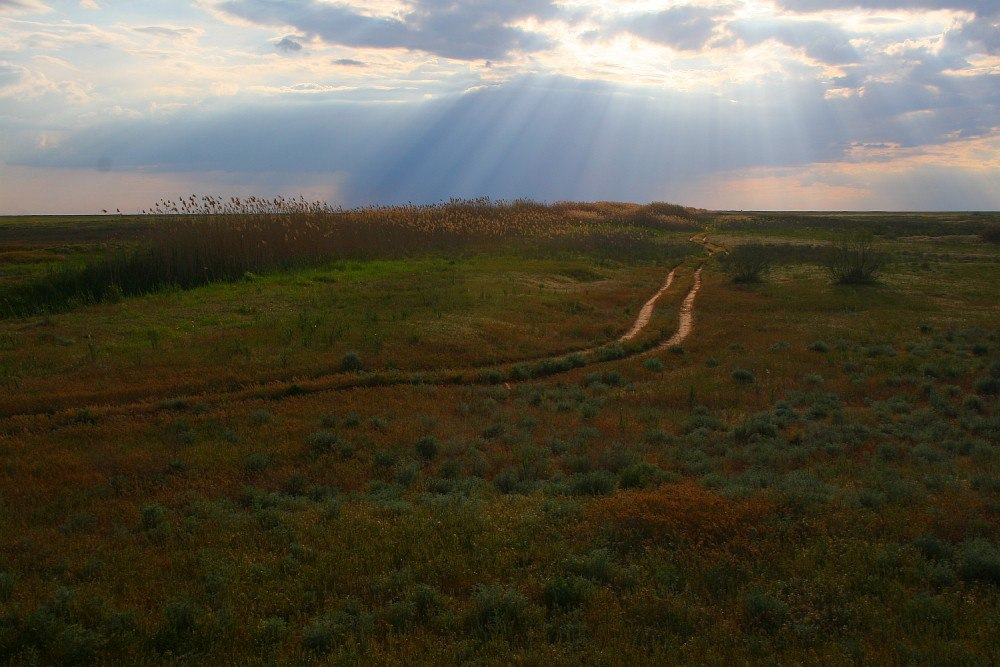
- Near Village Adyk, Chernozemelsky District

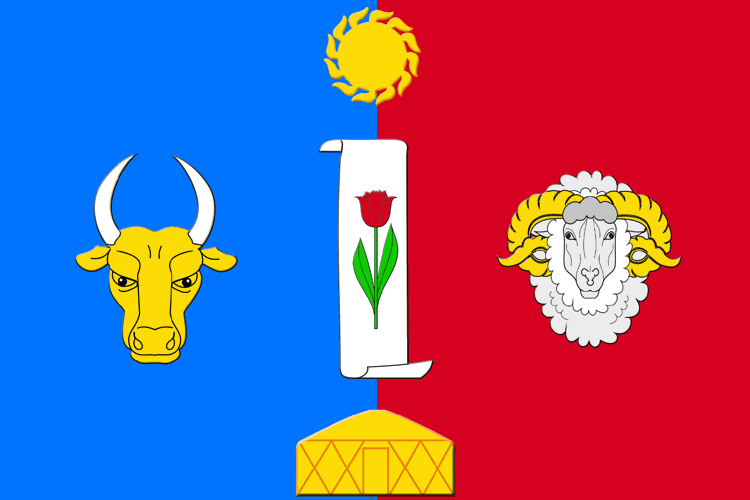
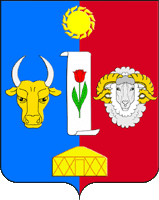
- Flag Coat of arms
- Location of Chernozemelsky District in the Republic of Kalmykia
- Coordinates: 45°20′N 46°02′E
- Country: Russia
- Federal subject: Republic of Kalmykia
- Established: 1951
- Administrative center: Komsomolsky

Area
  - Total: 14,191.68 km^{2} (5,479.44 sq mi)

Population (2010 Census)
  - Total: 13,258
  - Density: 0.93421/km^{2} (2.4196/sq mi)
  - Urban: 0%
  - Rural: 100%

Administrative structure
  - Administrative divisions: 8 Rural administrations
  - Inhabited localities: 35 rural localities

Municipal structure
  - Municipally incorporated as: Chernozemelsky Municipal District
  - Municipal divisions: 0 urban settlements, 8 rural settlements
- Time zone: UTC+3 (MSK)
- OKTMO ID: 85642000
- Website: http://chrmo.rk08.ru

Population of Chernozemelsky District
- 2010 Census: 13,258
- 2002 Census: 12,990
- 1989 Census: 16,840
- 1979 Census: 14,831

Chernozemelsky District (Russian: Черноземе́льский райо́н, [t͡ɕʲɪrnɐzʲɪˈmʲelskɪj raˈjon]; Kalmyk: Хар Һазра район, romanized: Har Ğazra rayon, [ˈxar ɣazəˈra raˈjon]) is an administrative and municipal district (raion), one of the thirteen in the Republic of Kalmykia, Russia. It is located in the southeast of the republic. The area of the district is 14,191.68 square kilometers (5,479.44 sq mi). Its administrative center is the rural locality (a settlement) of Komsomolsky. As of the 2010 Census, the total population of the district was 13,258, with the population of Komsomolsky accounting for 34.1% of that number. It is the least densely populated district in the Southern Federal District.

== History ==
The district was established in 1951.

== Administrative and municipal status ==
Within the framework of administrative divisions, Chernozemelsky District is one of the thirteen in the Republic of Kalmykia. The district is divided into eight rural administrations which comprise thirty-five rural localities. As a municipal division, the district is incorporated as Chernozemelsky Municipal District. Its eight rural administrations are incorporated as eight rural settlements within the municipal district. The settlement of Komsomolsky serves as the administrative center of both the administrative and municipal district.
