= Komsomolsky, Velsky District, Arkhangelsk Oblast =

Komsomolsky Комсомольский
- Settlement
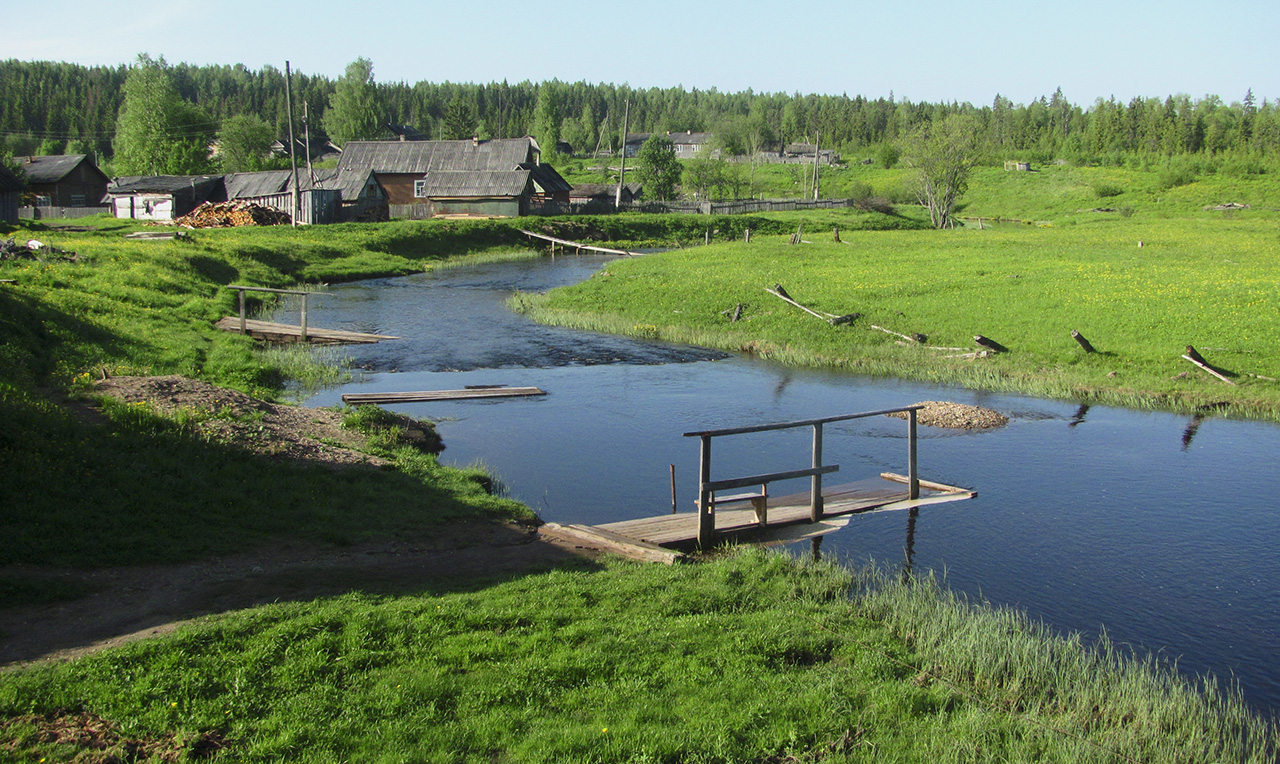
- Shonosha River in Komsomolsky Village

- Location within Arkhangelsk Oblast Location within Russia
- Coordinates: 61°19′N 41°08′E
- Country: Russia
- Region: Arkhangelsk Oblast
- District: Velsky District
- Time zone: UTC+3:00

Komsomolsky (Russian: Комсомольский) is a rural locality (a settlement) and the administrative center of Verkhneshonoshskoye Rural Settlement of Velsky District, Arkhangelsk Oblast, Russia. The population was 949 as of 2014. There are 14 streets.

== Geography ==
Komsomolsky is located 92 km northwest of Velsk (the district's administrative centre) by road. Tyomnaya is the nearest rural locality.
