= Novotroitsk, Sharansky District, Republic of Bashkortostan =

Novotroitsk Новотроицк
- Village
- Location within Bashkortostan Location within Russia
- Coordinates: 54°57′N 54°16′E
- Country: Russia
- Region: Bashkortostan
- District: Sharansky District
- Time zone: UTC+5:00

Novotroitsk (Russian: Новотроицк) is a rural locality (a village) in Michurinsky Selsoviet, Sharansky District, Bashkortostan, Russia. The population was 17 as of 2010. There is 1 street.

== Geography ==
Novotroitsk is located 27 km northeast of Sharan (the district's administrative centre) by road. Grigoryevka is the nearest rural locality.
