= Kazantsevo, Perm Krai =

Kazantsevo Казанцево
- Village
- Location within Perm Krai Location within Russia
- Coordinates: 56°35′N 56°28′E
- Country: Russia
- Region: Perm Krai
- District: Chernushinsky District
- Time zone: UTC+5:00

Kazantsevo (Russian: Казанцево) is a rural locality (a village) in Chernushinsky District, Perm Krai, Russia. The population was 31 as of 2010. There are 4 streets.

== Geography ==
Kazantsevo is located 41 km northeast of Chernushka (the district's administrative centre) by road. Olkhovka is the nearest rural locality.
