= Komsomolsky, Talovsky District, Voronezh Oblast =

Komsomolsky Комсомольский
- Settlement
- Location within Voronezh Oblast Location within Russia
- Coordinates: 51°12′N 40°37′E
- Country: Russia
- Region: Voronezh Oblast
- District: Talovsky District
- Time zone: UTC+3:00

Komsomolsky (Russian: Комсомольский) is a rural locality (a settlement) in Alexandrovskoye Rural Settlement, Talovsky District, Voronezh Oblast, Russia. The population was 207 as of 2010. There are 6 streets.

== Geography ==
Komsomolsky is located 17 km northwest of Talovaya (the district's administrative centre) by road. Alexandrovka is the nearest rural locality.
