= Komsomolsky, Ramonsky District, Voronezh Oblast =

Komsomolsky Комсомольский
- Settlement
- Location within Voronezh Oblast Location within Russia
- Coordinates: 51°59′N 39°13′E
- Country: Russia
- Region: Voronezh Oblast
- District: Ramonsky District
- Time zone: UTC+3:00

Komsomolsky (Russian: Комсомольский) is a rural locality (a settlement) and the administrative center of Komsomolskoye Rural Settlement, Ramonsky District, Voronezh Oblast, Russia. The population was 926 as of 2010. There are 16 streets.

== Geography ==
Komsomolsky is located 17 km northwest of Ramon (the district's administrative centre) by road. Sergeyevskoye is the nearest rural locality.
