= Novotroitsk, Yanaulsky District, Republic of Bashkortostan =

Novotroitsk Новотроицк
- Village
- Location within Bashkortostan Location within Russia
- Coordinates: 56°04′N 55°03′E
- Country: Russia
- Region: Bashkortostan
- District: Yanaulsky District
- Time zone: UTC+5:00

Novotroitsk (Russian: Новотроицк) is a rural locality (a village) in Izhboldinsky Selsoviet, Yanaulsky District, Bashkortostan, Russia. The population was 115 as of 2010. There is 1 street.

== Geography ==
Novotroitsk is located 26 km south of Yanaul (the district's administrative centre) by road. Atlegach is the nearest rural locality.
