= Komsomolsky, Yurlinsky District, Perm Krai =

Komsomolsky Комсомольский
- Settlement
- Location within Perm Krai Location within Russia
- Coordinates: 59°30′N 53°49′E
- Country: Russia
- Region: Perm Krai
- District: Yurlinsky District
- Time zone: UTC+5:00

Komsomolsky (Russian: Комсомольский) is a rural locality (a settlement) in Ust-Berezovskoye Rural Settlement, Yurlinsky District, Perm Krai, Russia. The population was 209 as of 2010. There are 6 streets.

== Geography ==
Komsomolsky is located 43 km northwest of Yurla (the district's administrative centre) by road. Lipova is the nearest rural locality.
