= Komsomolets, Volgograd Oblast =

Komsomolets Комсомолец
- Selo
- Location within Volgograd Oblast Location within Russia
- Coordinates: 49°57′N 45°38′E
- Country: Russia
- Region: Volgograd Oblast
- District: Nikolayevsky District
- Time zone: UTC+4:00

Komsomolets (Russian: Комсомолец) is a rural locality (a selo) in Leninskoye Rural Settlement, Nikolayevsky District, Volgograd Oblast, Russia. The population was 915 as of 2010. There are 12 streets.

== Geography ==
Komsomolets is located in steppe, on the left bank of the Volgograd Reservoir, on the bank of Zavolzhsky Canal, 24 km southeast of Nikolayevsk (the district's administrative centre) by road. Leninskoye is the nearest rural locality.
