= Komsomolsky, Duvansky District, Republic of Bashkortostan =

Komsomolsky Комсомольский
- Selo
- Location within Bashkortostan Location within Russia
- Coordinates: 55°36′N 57°26′E
- Country: Russia
- Region: Bashkortostan
- District: Duvansky District
- Time zone: UTC+5:00

Komsomolsky (Russian: Комсомольский) is a rural locality (a selo) in Duvansky Selsoviet, Duvansky District, Bashkortostan, Russia. The population was 52 as of 2010. There is 1 street.

== Geography ==
Komsomolsky is located 69 km west of Mesyagutovo (the district's administrative centre) by road. Kalmash is the nearest rural locality.
