= Komsomolsky, Republic of Kalmykia =

Rural locality in Kalmykia, Russia

Coordinates: 45°19′50″N 46°02′29″E

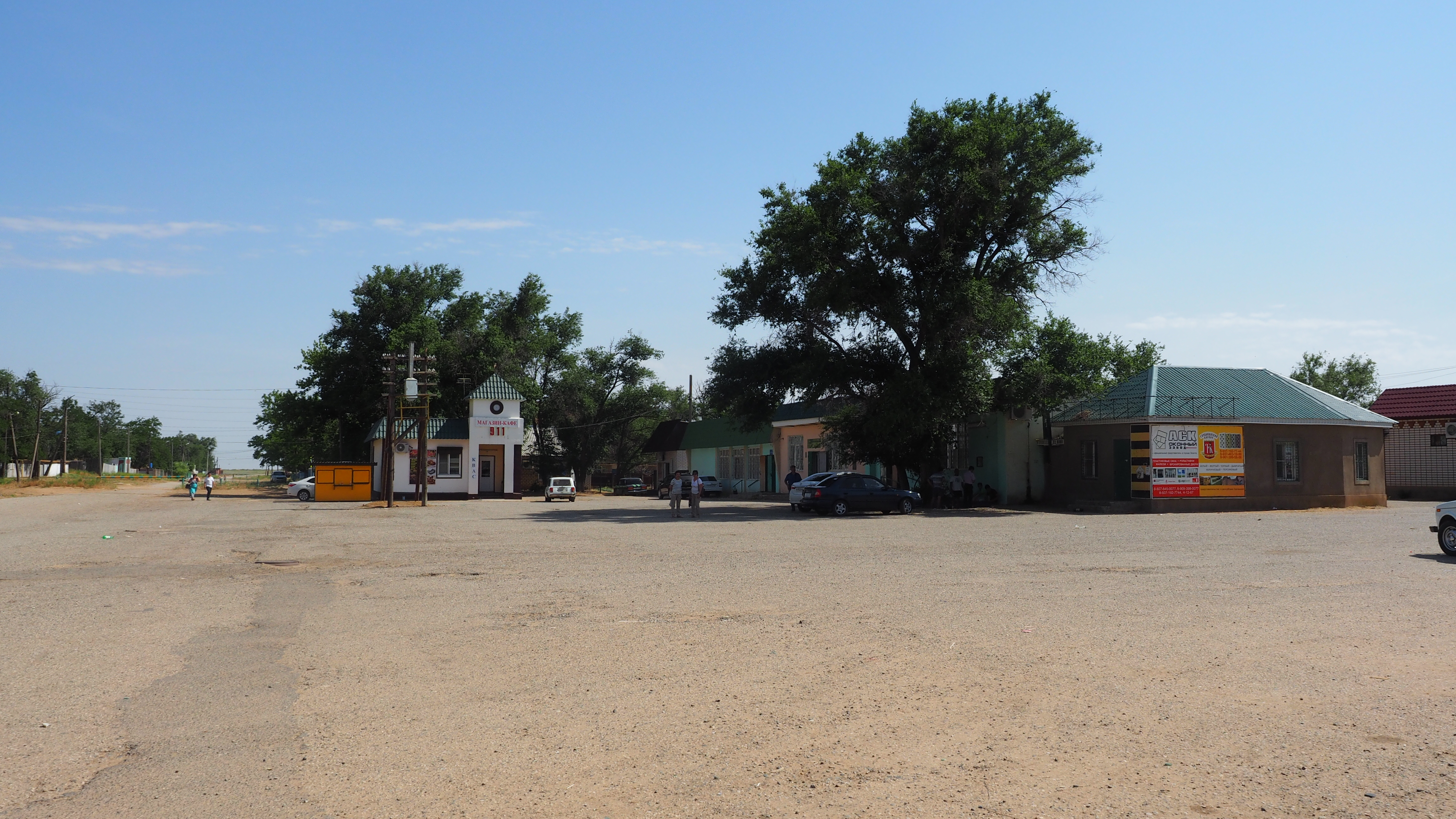
Komsomolskiy

Komsomolsky (Russian: Комсомо́льский, Oirat: Комсомольский) is a rural locality (a settlement) and the administrative center of Chernozemelsky District of the Republic of Kalmykia, Russia. Population: 4,525 (2010 census); 3,983 (2002 census); 4,050 (1989 Soviet census).
