= Komsomolsky, Kalachyovsky District, Volgograd Oblast =

Komsomolsky Комсомольский
- Settlement
- Location within Volgograd Oblast Location within Russia
- Coordinates: 48°39′N 43°52′E
- Country: Russia
- Region: Volgograd Oblast
- District: Kalachyovsky District
- Time zone: UTC+4:00

Komsomolsky (Russian: Комсомольский) is a rural locality (a settlement) in Sovetskoye Rural Settlement, Kalachyovsky District, Volgograd Oblast, Russia. The population was 1,224 as of 2010. There are 33 streets.

== Geography ==
Komsomolsky is located 30 km east of Kalach-na-Donu (the district's administrative centre) by road. Prikanalny is the nearest rural locality.
