= Komsomolsky, Karaidelsky District, Republic of Bashkortostan =

Komsomolsky Комсомольский
- Selo
- Location within Bashkortostan Location within Russia
- Coordinates: 55°42′N 57°08′E
- Country: Russia
- Region: Bashkortostan
- District: Karaidelsky District
- Time zone: UTC+5:00

Komsomolsky (Russian: Комсомольский) is a rural locality (a selo) in Karayarsky Selsoviet, Karaidelsky District, Bashkortostan, Russia. The population was 491 as of 2010. There are 16 streets.

== Geography ==
Komsomolsky is located 33 km southeast of Karaidel (the district's administrative centre) by road. Ust-Sukhoyaz is the nearest rural locality.
