= Kazantsevo, Shushensky District, Krasnoyarsk Krai =

Rural locality in Shushensky District, Russia

Coordinates: 53°24′25″N 92°00′00″E

Kazantsevo (Russian: Каза́нцево) is a rural locality (a selo) in Shushensky District of Krasnoyarsk Krai, Russia.

The climate is cool in summer and is very cold in winter, with temperatures reaching −40 °C (−40 °F).
