= Komsomolsky, Miyakinsky District, Republic of Bashkortostan =

Komsomolsky Комсомольский
- Village
- Location within Bashkortostan Location within Russia
- Coordinates: 53°44′N 55°01′E
- Country: Russia
- Region: Bashkortostan
- District: Miyakinsky District
- Time zone: UTC+5:00

Komsomolsky (Russian: Комсомольский) is a rural locality (a village) in Karanovsky Selsoviet, Miyakinsky District, Bashkortostan, Russia. The population was 177 as of 2010. There are 3 streets.

== Geography ==
Komsomolsky is located 37 km northeast of Kirgiz-Miyaki (the district's administrative centre) by road. Sergeyevka is the nearest rural locality.
