= Komsomolskoye, Republic of Buryatia =

Komsomolskoye Комсомольское
- Selo
- Location within Republic of Buryatia Location within Russia
- Coordinates: 52°28′N 111°05′E
- Country: Russia
- Region: Republic of Buryatia
- District: Yeravninsky District
- Time zone: UTC+8:00

Komsomolskoye (Russian: Комсомольское; Buryat: Харха, Kharkha) is a rural locality (a selo) and the administrative centre of Komsomolskoye Rural Settlement, Yeravninsky District, Republic of Buryatia, Russia. The population was 677 as of 2017. There are 28 streets.

== Geography ==
Komsomolskoye is located 32 km west of Sosnovo-Ozerskoye (the district's administrative centre) by road. Gonda is the nearest rural locality.
