= Komsomolsky, Novonikolayevsky District, Volgograd Oblast =

Komsomolsky Комсомольский
- Settlement
- Location within Volgograd Oblast Location within Russia
- Coordinates: 50°59′N 42°28′E
- Country: Russia
- Region: Volgograd Oblast
- District: Novonikolayevsky District
- Time zone: UTC+4:00

Komsomolsky (Russian: Комсомольский) is a rural locality (a settlement) and the administrative center of Komsomolskoye Rural Settlement, Novonikolayevsky District, Volgograd Oblast, Russia. The population was 882 as of 2010. There are 15 streets.

== Geography ==
Komsomolsky is located in steppe, on the Khopyorsko-Buzulukskaya Plain, 9 km northeast of Novonikolayevsky (the district's administrative centre) by road. Ruzheynikovsky is the nearest rural locality.
