= Komsomolsky, Kungursky District, Perm Krai =

Komsomolsky Комсомольский
- Settlement
- Location within Perm Krai Location within Russia
- Coordinates: 57°27′N 57°07′E
- Country: Russia
- Region: Perm Krai
- District: Kungursky District
- Time zone: UTC+5:00

Komsomolsky (Russian: Комсомольский) is a rural locality (a settlement) and the administrative center of Komsomolskoye Rural Settlement, Kungursky District, Perm Krai, Russia. The population was 3,096 as of 2010. There are 26 streets.

== Geography ==
Komsomolsky is located 17 km northeast of Kungur (the district's administrative centre) by road. Michkovo is the nearest rural locality.
