= Komsomolskoye, Zabaykalsky Krai =

Komsomolskoye Комсомольское
- Selo
- Location within Zabaykalsky Krai Location within Russia
- Coordinates: 52°20′N 116°52′E
- Country: Russia
- Region: Zabaykalsky Krai
- District: Chernyshevsky District
- Time zone: UTC+9:00

Komsomolskoye (Russian: Комсомольское) is a rural locality (a selo) in Chernyshevsky District, Zabaykalsky Krai, Russia. Population: 855 (2021 census); 991 (2010 census); There are 14 streets in this selo.

== Geography ==
This rural locality is located 22 km from Chernyshevsk (the district's administrative centre), 232 km from Chita (capital of Zabaykalsky Krai) and 5,396 km from Moscow. Bagulny is the nearest rural locality.
