= Komsomolskoye, Ertilsky District, Voronezh Oblast =

Komsomolskoye Комсомольское
- Settlement
- Location within Voronezh Oblast Location within Russia
- Coordinates: 51°40′N 40°46′E
- Country: Russia
- Region: Voronezh Oblast
- District: Ertilsky District
- Time zone: UTC+3:00

Komsomolskoye (Russian: Комсомольское) is a rural locality (a settlement) in Pervomayskoye Rural Settlement, Ertilsky District, Voronezh Oblast, Russia. The population was 169 as of 2010. There are 5 streets.

== Geography ==
Komsomolskoye is located 35 km south of Ertil (the district's administrative centre) by road. Pervomaysky is the nearest rural locality.
