= Kasmala (river) =

River in Siberia, Russia

Kasmala Касмала
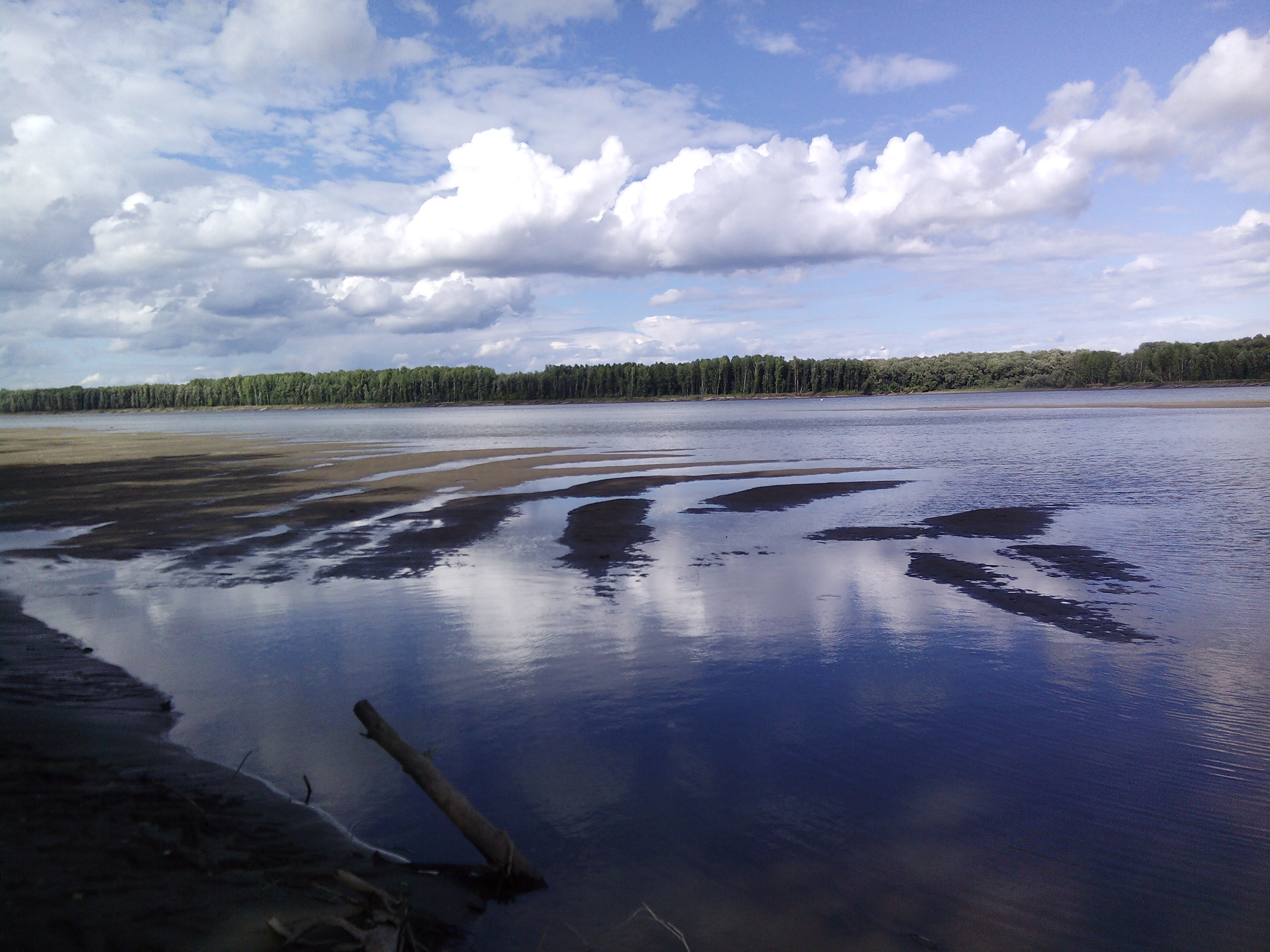
- View of the banks of the river near its mouth in the Ob

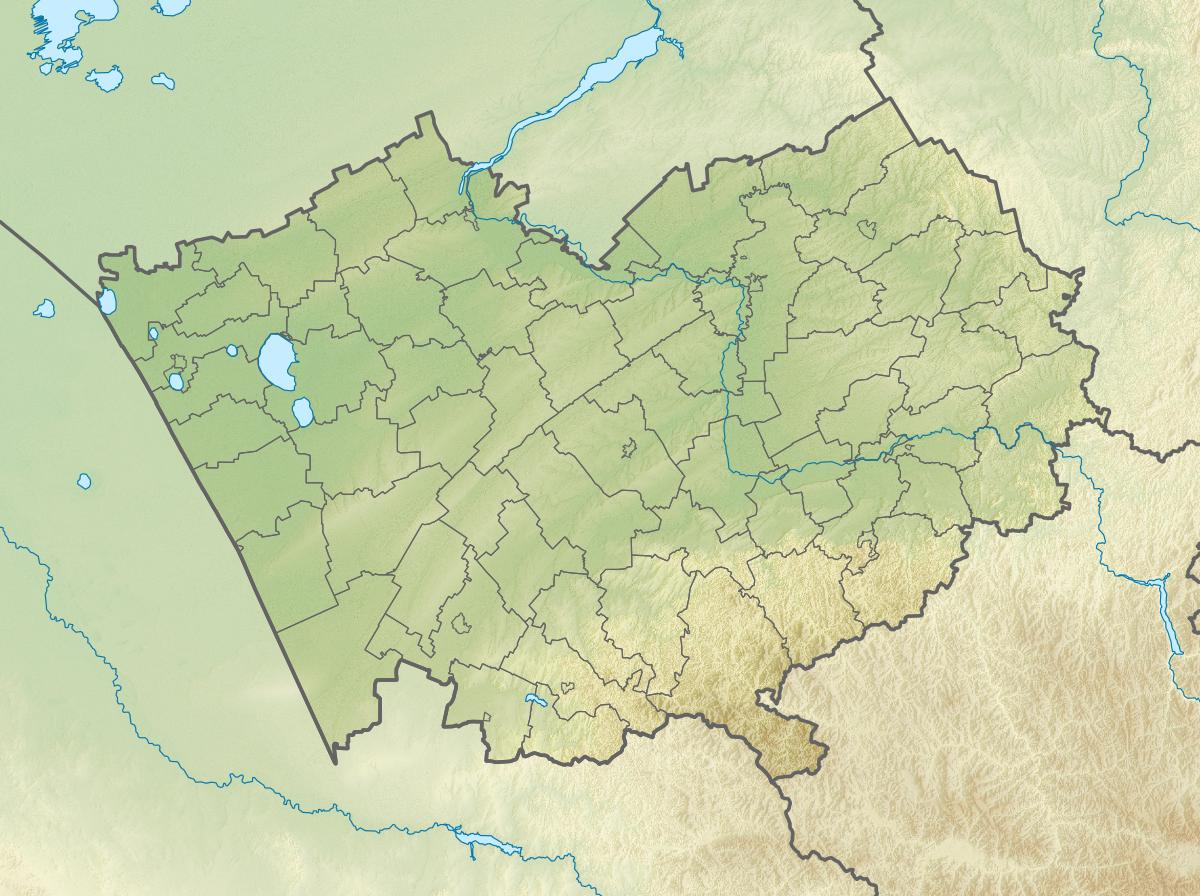
- Mouth location in Altai Krai, Russia

Location
- Country: Russia

Physical characteristics
- Source: Ob Plateau
  - coordinates: 52°55′20″N 82°03′42″E
- Mouth: Ob
  - location: Kasmala
  - coordinates: 53°29′0″N 83°15′50″E
- Length: 119 km (74 mi)
- Basin size: 2,550 km^{2} (980 sq mi)

Basin features
- Progression: Ob→ Kara Sea

The Kasmala (Russian: Касмала) is a river in Altai Krai, Russia. The river is 119 kilometres (74 mi) long and has a catchment area of 2,550 square kilometres (980 sq mi).

The basin of the river is located in the Rebrikhinsky and Pavlovsky districts. Kasmala rural locality is named after the river.

== Course ==
The Kasmala is a left tributary of the Ob river. It has its sources in lake Seleznevo-Borovskoye, located 30 km (19 mi) northeast of lake Bolshoye Ostrovnoye in a swampy area of the Ob Plateau. The river flows in a roughly northeastern direction within one of the wide ravines of glacial origin that cut diagonally across the plateau. Finally it meets the left bank of the Ob at Kasmala, 3,343 km (2,077 mi) from the Ob's mouth.

=== Tributaries ===
The longest tributary of the Kasmala is the 32 km (20 mi) long Borovlyanka (Боровлянка) on the left. The river is frozen between November and April.

== See also ==
- List of rivers of Russia
