= Kazantsev =

Kazantsev (Russian: Казанцев; masculine) or Kazantseva (Казанцева; feminine) is a Russian surname. It is shared by the following people:

- Alexander Kazantsev, Soviet sci-fi writer
- Artyom Kazantsev (1988—2022), perpetrator of the Izhevsk school shooting
- Kira Kazantsev (born 1991), American beauty pageant titleholder who won Miss America 2015
- Viktor Kazantsev, Hero of the Russian Federation
- Vladimir Kazantsev (athlete)
- Vladimir Kazantsev (canoeist)
