= Kazantsevo, Zarinsky District, Altai Krai =

Kazantsevo Казанцево
- Settlement
- Location within Altai Krai Location within Russia
- Coordinates: 53°51′N 85°12′E
- Country: Russia
- Region: Altai Krai
- District: Zarinsky District
- Time zone: UTC+7:00

Kazantsevo (Russian: Казанцево) is a rural locality (a settlement) in Novodrachyoninsky Selsoviet, Zarinsky District, Altai Krai, Russia. The population was 105 as of 2013. There are 5 streets.

== Geography ==
Kazantsevo is located 35 km northeast of Zarinsk (the district's administrative centre) by road. Smaznevo is the nearest rural locality.
