= Novotroitsk, Karmaskalinsky District, Republic of Bashkortostan =

Novotroitsk Новотроицк
- Village
- Location within Bashkortostan Location within Russia
- Coordinates: 54°19′N 56°14′E
- Country: Russia
- Region: Bashkortostan
- District: Karmaskalinsky District
- Time zone: UTC+5:00

Novotroitsk (Russian: Новотроицк) is a rural locality (a village) in Karmaskalinsky Selsoviet, Karmaskalinsky District, Bashkortostan, Russia. The population was 16 as of 2010. There is 1 street.

== Geography ==
Novotroitsk is located 10 km southeast of Karmaskaly (the district's administrative centre) by road. Ivanovka is the nearest rural locality.
