= Komsomolsky, Pallasovsky District, Volgograd Oblast =

Komsomolsky Комсомольский
- Settlement
- Location within Volgograd Oblast Location within Russia
- Coordinates: 49°32′N 46°45′E
- Country: Russia
- Region: Volgograd Oblast
- District: Pallasovsky District
- Time zone: UTC+4:00

Komsomolsky (Russian: Комсомольский) is a rural locality (a settlement) and the administrative center of Kalashnikovskoye Rural Settlement, Pallasovsky District, Volgograd Oblast, Russia. The population was 1,285 as of 2010. There are 15 streets.

== Geography ==
Komsomolsky is located on the Caspian Depression, 65 km of Pallasovka (the district's administrative centre) by road. Vishnevka is the nearest rural locality.
