= Kazantsevo, Kuryinsky District, Altai Krai =

Kazantsevo Казанцево
- Selo
- Location within Altai Krai Location within Russia
- Coordinates: 51°21′N 82°21′E
- Country: Russia
- Region: Altai Krai
- District: Kuryinsky District
- Time zone: UTC+7:00

Kazantsevo (Russian: Казанцево) is a rural locality (a selo) in and the administrative center of Kazantsevsky Selsoviet, Kuryinsky District, Altai Krai, Russia. The population was 250 as of 2013. There are 6 streets.

== Geography ==
Kazantsevo is located 34 km south of Kurya (the district's administrative centre) by road. Rudovozovo is the nearest rural locality.
