= Komsomolskoye, Republic of Dagestan =

Komsomolskoye Комсомольское Эркенлъиб
- Selo
- Location within Republic of Dagestan Location within Russia
- Coordinates: 43°11′N 46°53′E
- Country: Russia
- Region: Republic of Dagestan
- District: Kizilyurtovsky District
- Time zone: UTC+3:00

Komsomolskoye (Russian: Комсомольское; Avar: Эркенлъиб) is a rural locality (a selo) in Kizilyurtovsky District, Republic of Dagestan, Russia. The population was 6,983 as of 2010. There are 47 streets.

== Nationalities ==
Avars live there.

== Geography ==
Komsomolskoye is located 3 km southeast of Kizilyurt (the district's administrative centre) by road. Kizilyurt and Nizhny Chiryurt are the nearest rural localities.
