= Talmenka, Talmensky District, Altai Krai =

Urban locality in Russia

Coordinates: 53.816°N 83.562°E

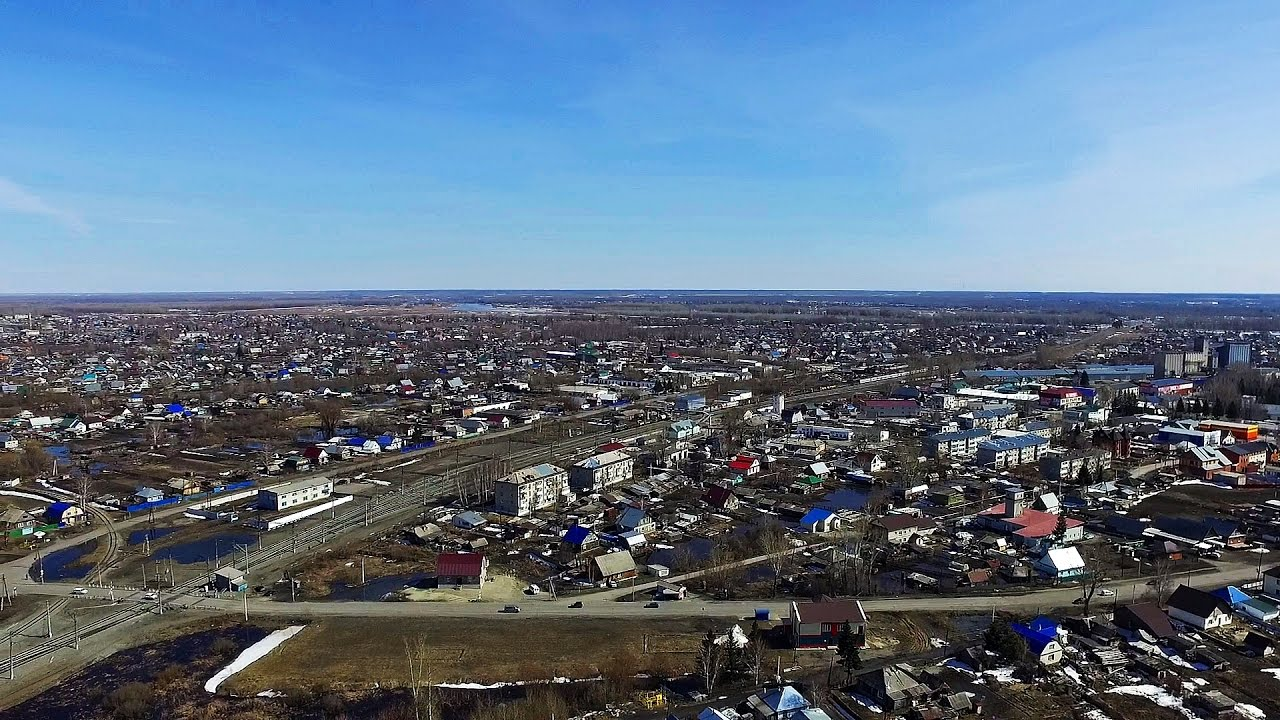
View of Talmenka

Talmenka (Russian: Тальменка) is an urban locality (work settlement) and the administrative center of Talmensky District of Altai Krai, Russia. Population: 18,814 (2010 census); 20,016 (2002 census); 19,720 (1989 Soviet census).
