= Talmensky District =

Talmensky District Тальменский район (Russian)
- District
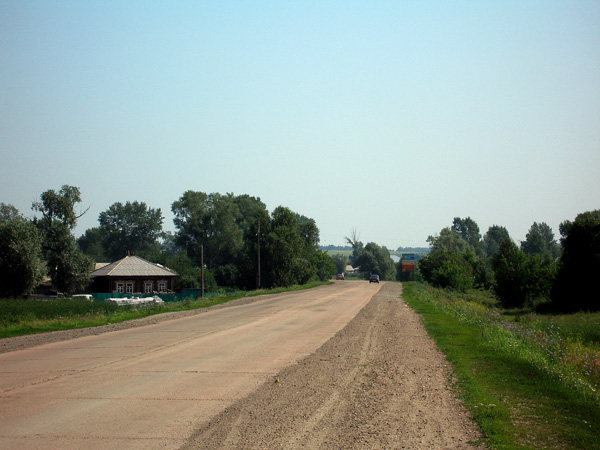
- A road in Talmenka, Talmensky District

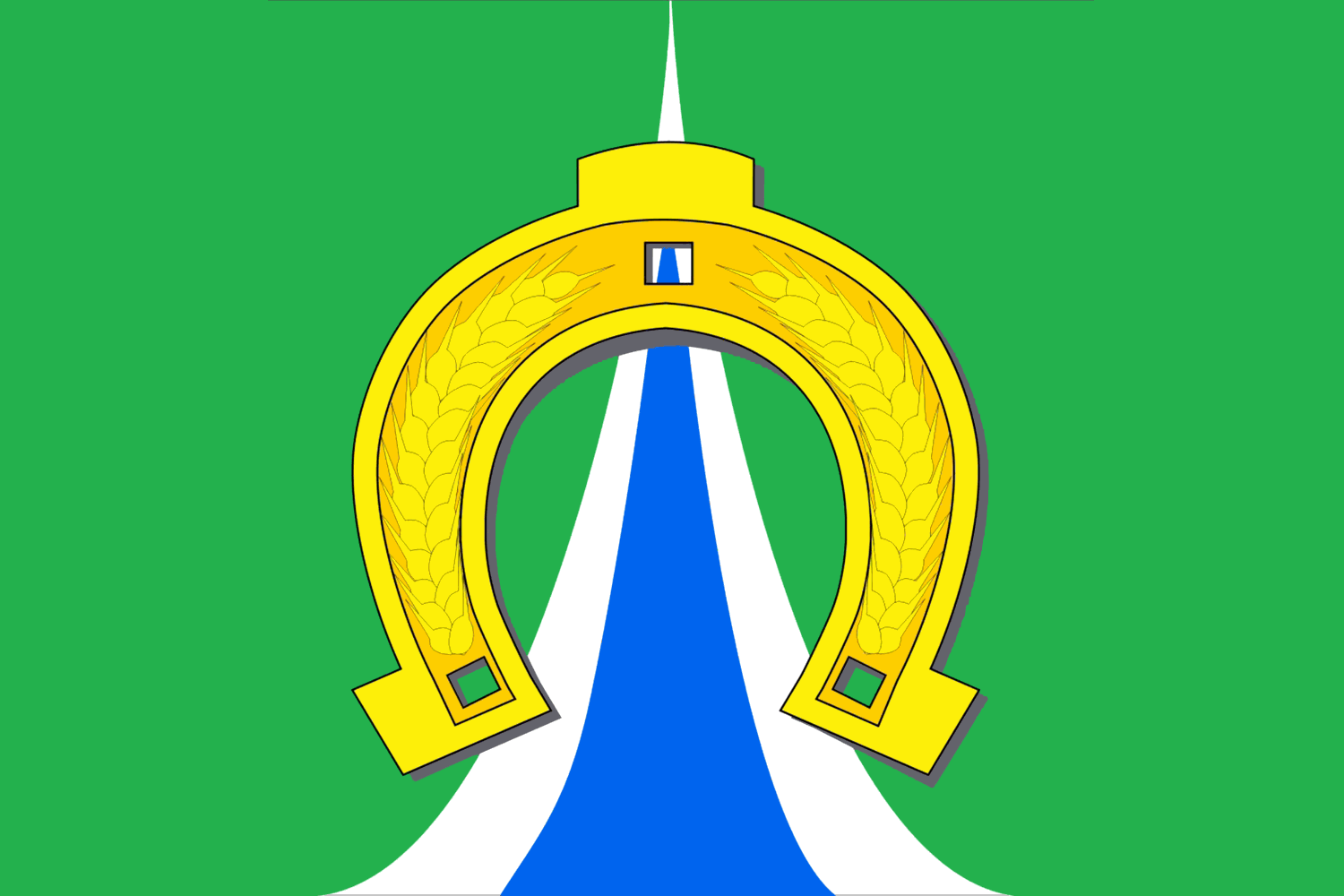
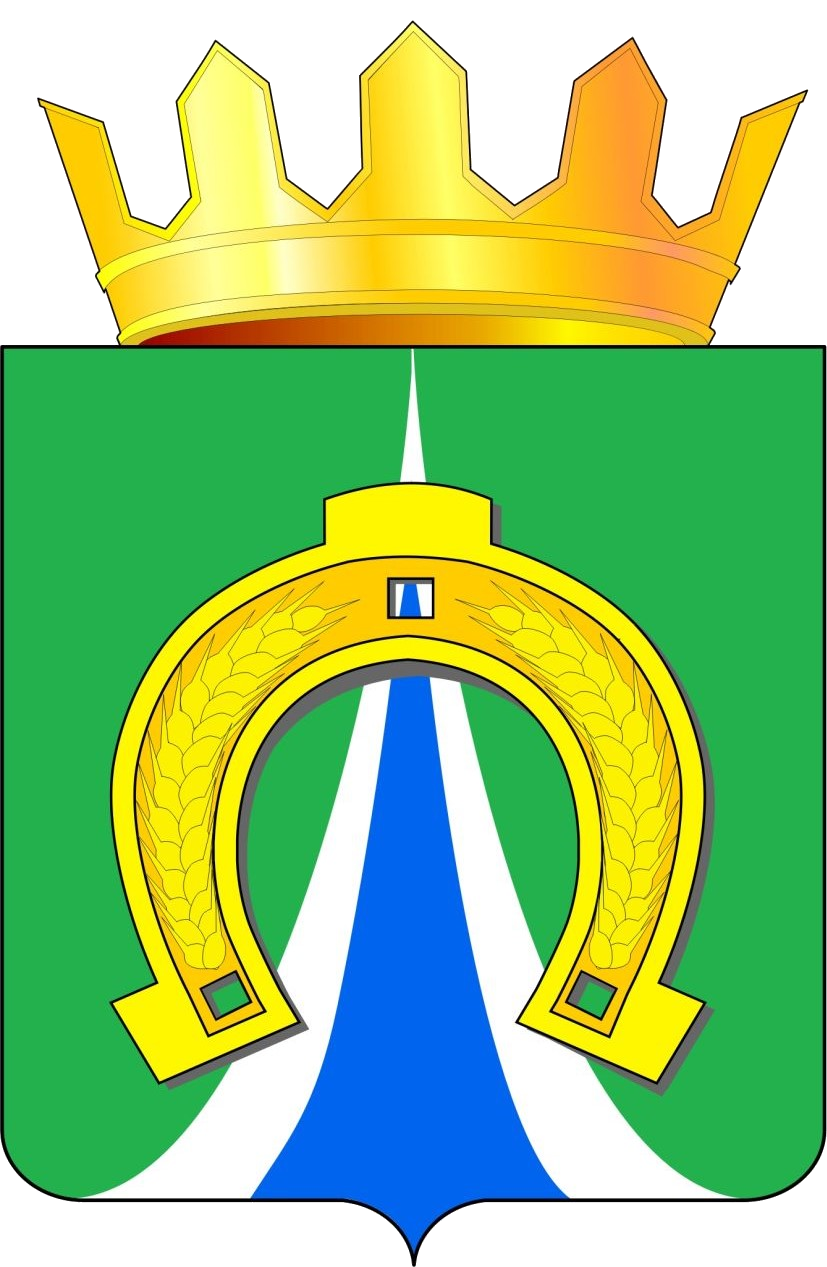
- Flag Coat of arms
- Location of Talmensky District in Altai Krai
- Coordinates: 53°48′N 83°36′E
- Country: Russia
- Federal subject: Altai Krai
- Established: 1924
- Administrative center: Talmenka

Area
  - Total: 3,914 km^{2} (1,511 sq mi)

Population (2010 Census)
  - Total: 46,770
  - Density: 11.95/km^{2} (30.95/sq mi)
  - Urban: 40.2%
  - Rural: 59.8%

Administrative structure
  - Administrative divisions: 1 Settlement administrations, 17 Selsoviets
  - Inhabited localities: 1 urban-type settlements, 41 rural localities

Municipal structure
  - Municipally incorporated as: Talmensky Municipal District
  - Municipal divisions: 1 urban settlements, 17 rural settlements
- Time zone: UTC+7 (MSK+4)
- OKTMO ID: 01647000
- Website: http://www.tal-alt.ru/

Talmensky District (Russian: Тальме́нский райо́н) is an administrative and municipal district (raion), one of the fifty-nine in Altai Krai, Russia. It is located in the north of the krai. The area of the district is 3,914 square kilometers (1,511 sq mi). Its administrative center is the urban locality (a work settlement) of Talmenka. Population: 46,770 (2010 census); 48,287 (2002 census); 48,569 (1989 Soviet census). The population of Talmenka accounts for 40.2% of the district's total population.
