= Mamontovo, Mamontovsky District, Altai Krai =

Rural locality in Russia

Mamontovo Мамонтово
- Selo
- Interactive map of Mamontovo
- Location of Mamontovo Mamontovo (Altai Krai)
- Coordinates: 52°42′30″N 81°37′39″E
- Country: Russia
- Federal subject: Altai Krai
- Administrative district: Mamontovsky District
- SelsovietSelsoviet: Mamontovsky Selsoviet
- Founded: 1780

Population (2010 Census)
  - Total: 8,784
  - Estimate (2021): 8,251 (−6.1%)

Administrative status
  - Capital of: Mamontovsky District, Mamontovsky Selsoviet

Municipal status
  - Municipal district: Mamontovsky Municipal District
  - Rural settlement: Mamontovsky Selsoviet Rural Settlement
  - Capital of: Mamontovsky Municipal District, Mamontovsky Selsoviet Rural Settlement
- Time zone: UTC+7 (MSK+4)
- Postal code: 658560
- OKTMO ID: 01626449101

Mamontovo (Russian: Мамонтово) is a rural locality (a selo) and the administrative center of Mamontovsky District of Altai Krai, Russia. Population: 8,784 (2010 census); 9,348 (2002 census); 8,980 (1989 Soviet census).
