= Mamontovsky District =

Mamontovsky District Мамонтовский район (Russian)
- District
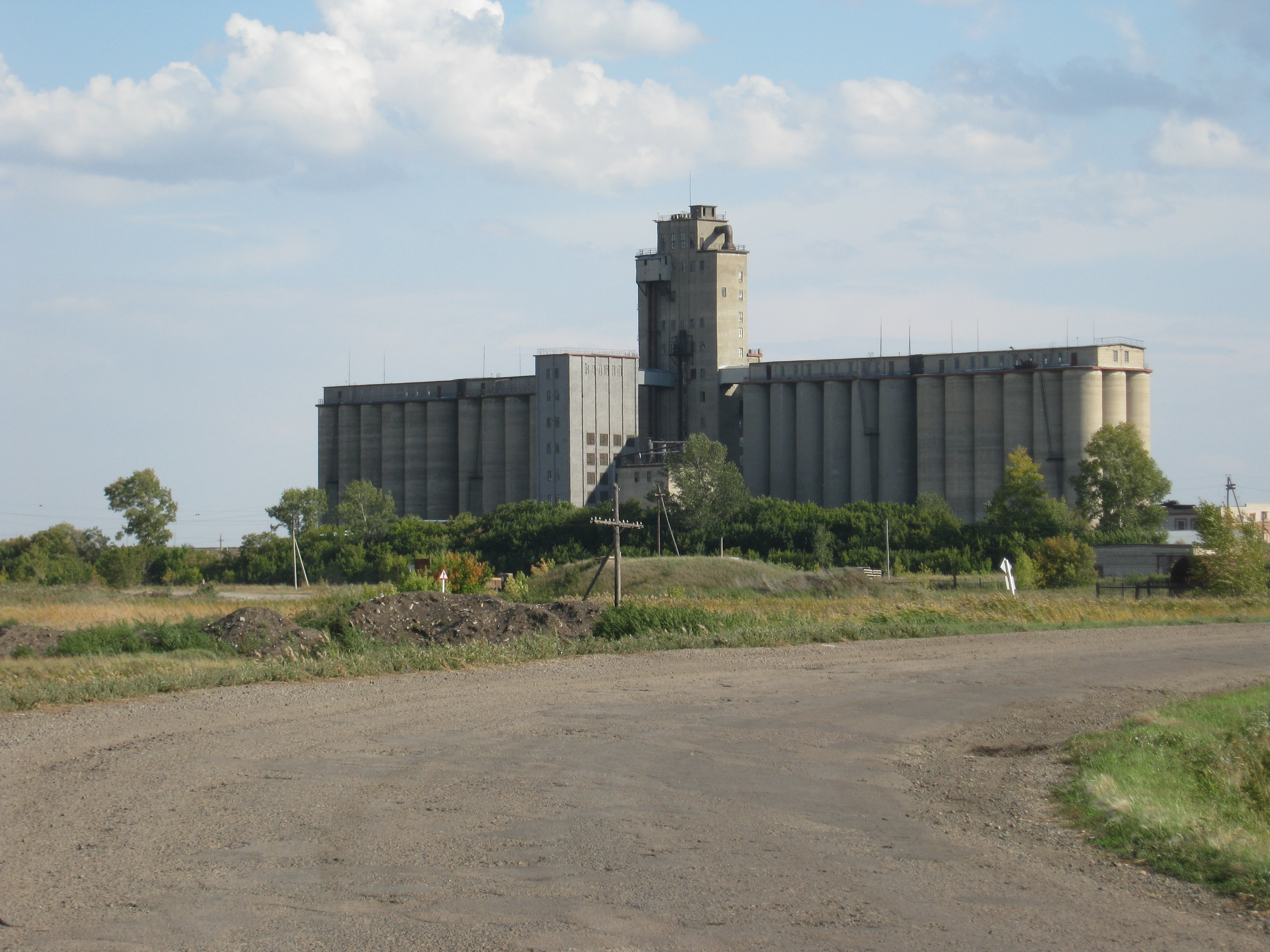
- Grain elevator in the settlement of Komsomolsky in Mamontovsky District

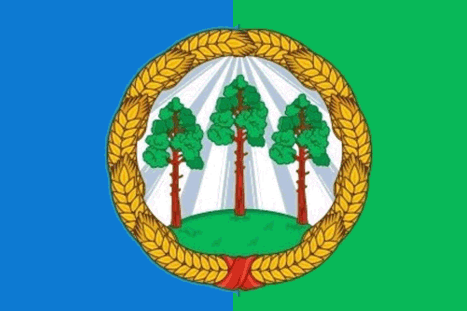
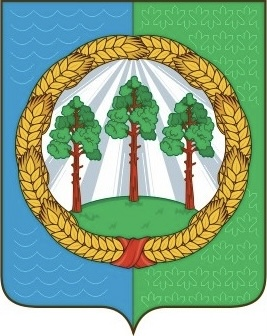
- Flag Coat of arms
- Location of Mamontovsky District in Altai Krai
- Coordinates: 52°42′N 81°38′E
- Country: Russia
- Federal subject: Altai Krai
- Established: May 27, 1924
- Administrative center: Mamontovo

Area
  - Total: 2,305.2 km^{2} (890.0 sq mi)

Population (2010 Census)
  - Total: 23,412
  - Density: 10.156/km^{2} (26.304/sq mi)
  - Urban: 0%
  - Rural: 100%

Administrative structure
  - Administrative divisions: 13 Selsoviets
  - Inhabited localities: 22 rural localities

Municipal structure
  - Municipally incorporated as: Mamontovsky Municipal District
  - Municipal divisions: 0 urban settlements, 13 rural settlements
- Time zone: UTC+7 (MSK+4)
- OKTMO ID: 01626000
- Website: http://mamontovo22.ru

Population of Mamontovsky District
- 2010 Census: 23,412
- 2002 Census: 26,102
- 1989 Census: 26,092
- 1979 Census: 26,032

Mamontovsky District (Russian: Ма́монтовский райо́н) is an administrative and municipal district (raion), one of the fifty-nine in Altai Krai, Russia. It is located in the center of the krai. The area of the district is 2,305.2 square kilometers (890.0 sq mi). Its administrative center is the rural locality (a selo) of Mamontovo. As of the 2010 Census, the total population of the district was 23,412, with the population of Mamontovo accounting for 37.5% of that number.

== Geography ==
Lakes Gorkoye and Bolshoye Ostrovnoye are located in the district.
