= Romanovo, Romanovsky District, Altai Krai =

Rural locality in Altai Krai, Russia

Coordinates: 52.620°N 81.227°E

Romanovo (Russian: Романово) is a rural locality (a selo) and the administrative center of Romanovsky District of Altai Krai, Russia. Population: 5,624 (2010 census); 6,243 (2002 census); 6,174 (1989 Soviet census).
