= Romanovsky District, Altai Krai =

Romanovsky District Романовский район (Russian)
- District
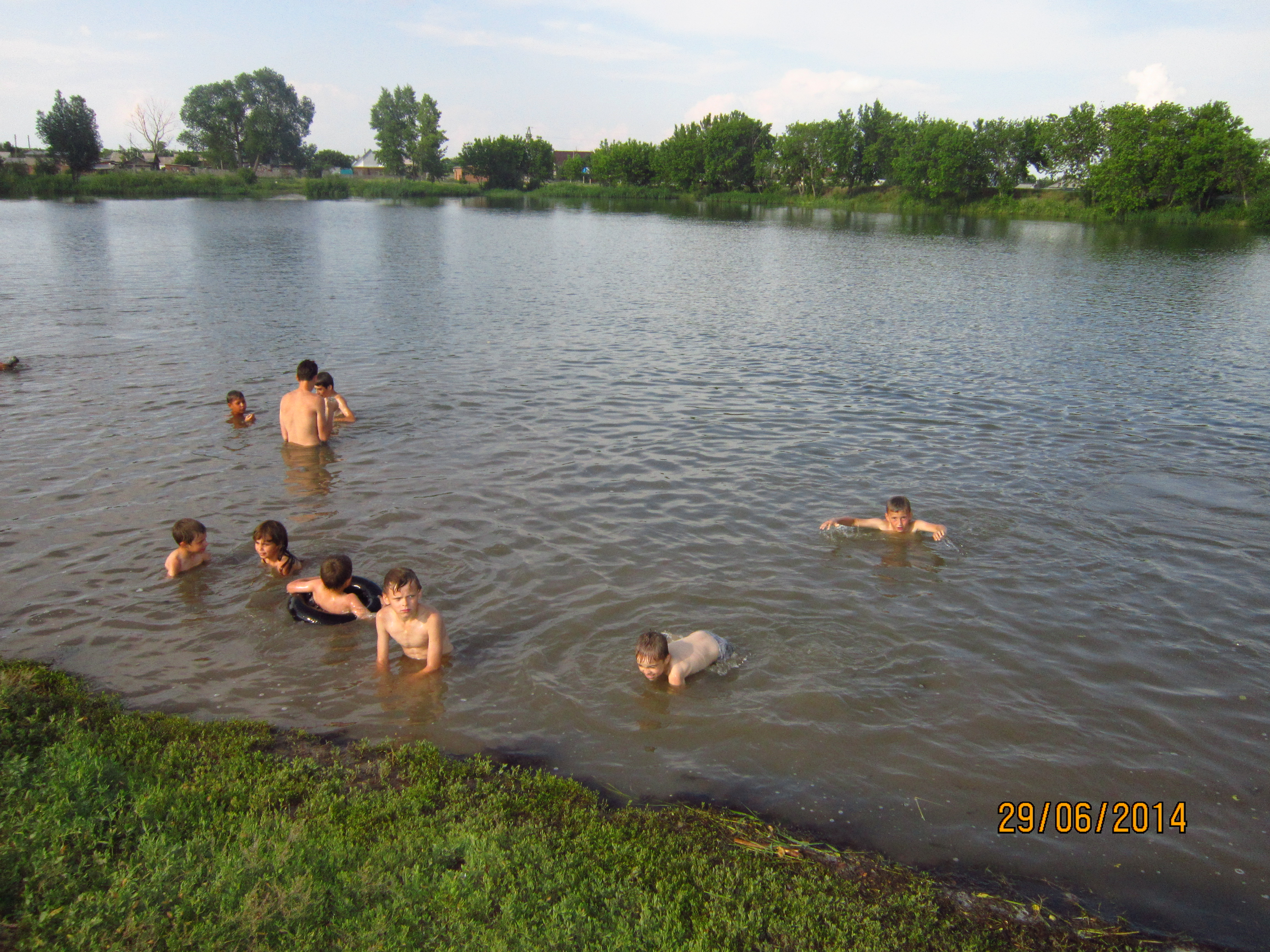
- Swimming in pond near Romanovo, Romanovsky District

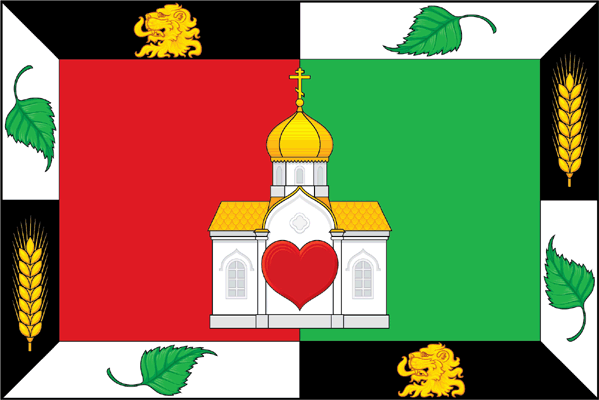
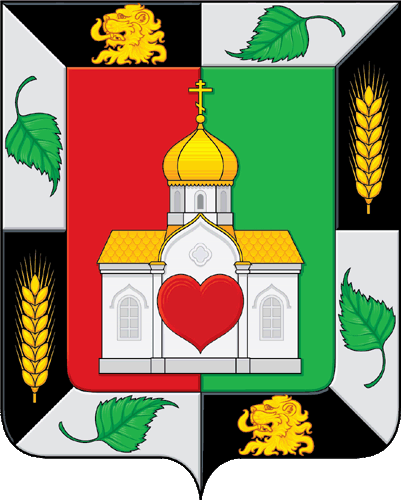
- Flag Coat of arms
- Location of Romanovsky District in Altai Krai
- Coordinates: 52°37′N 81°14′E
- Country: Russia
- Federal subject: Altai Krai
- Established: 15 January 1944
- Administrative center: Romanovo

Area
  - Total: 2,082 km^{2} (804 sq mi)

Population (2010 Census)
  - Total: 13,179
  - Density: 6.330/km^{2} (16.39/sq mi)
  - Urban: 0%
  - Rural: 100%

Administrative structure
  - Administrative divisions: 12 selsoviet
  - Inhabited localities: 16 rural localities

Municipal structure
  - Municipally incorporated as: Romanovsky Municipal District
  - Municipal divisions: 0 urban settlements, 12 rural settlements
- Time zone: UTC+7 (MSK+4)
- OKTMO ID: 01637000
- Website: http://admromalt.ru/

Romanovsky District (Russian: Рома́новский райо́н) is an administrative and municipal district (raion), one of the fifty-nine in Altai Krai, Russia. It is located in the western central part of the krai. The area of the district is 2,082 square kilometers (804 sq mi). Its administrative center is the rural locality (a selo) of Romanovo. Population: 13,179 (2010 census); 15,412 (2002 census); 16,111 (1989 Soviet census). The population of Romanovo accounts for 42.7% of the district's total population.

== Geography ==
Lakes Gorkoye (Chernokurynskoye) and Gorkoye are located in the district.
