= Pavlovsk, Altai Krai =

Rural locality in Pavlovsky District, Russia

Coordinates: 53°19′N 83°01′E

Pavlovsk (Russian: Па́вловск) is a rural locality (a selo) and the administrative center of Pavlovsky District of Altai Krai, Russia. Population: 14,533 (2010 census); 14,944 (2002 census).

== Gallery ==
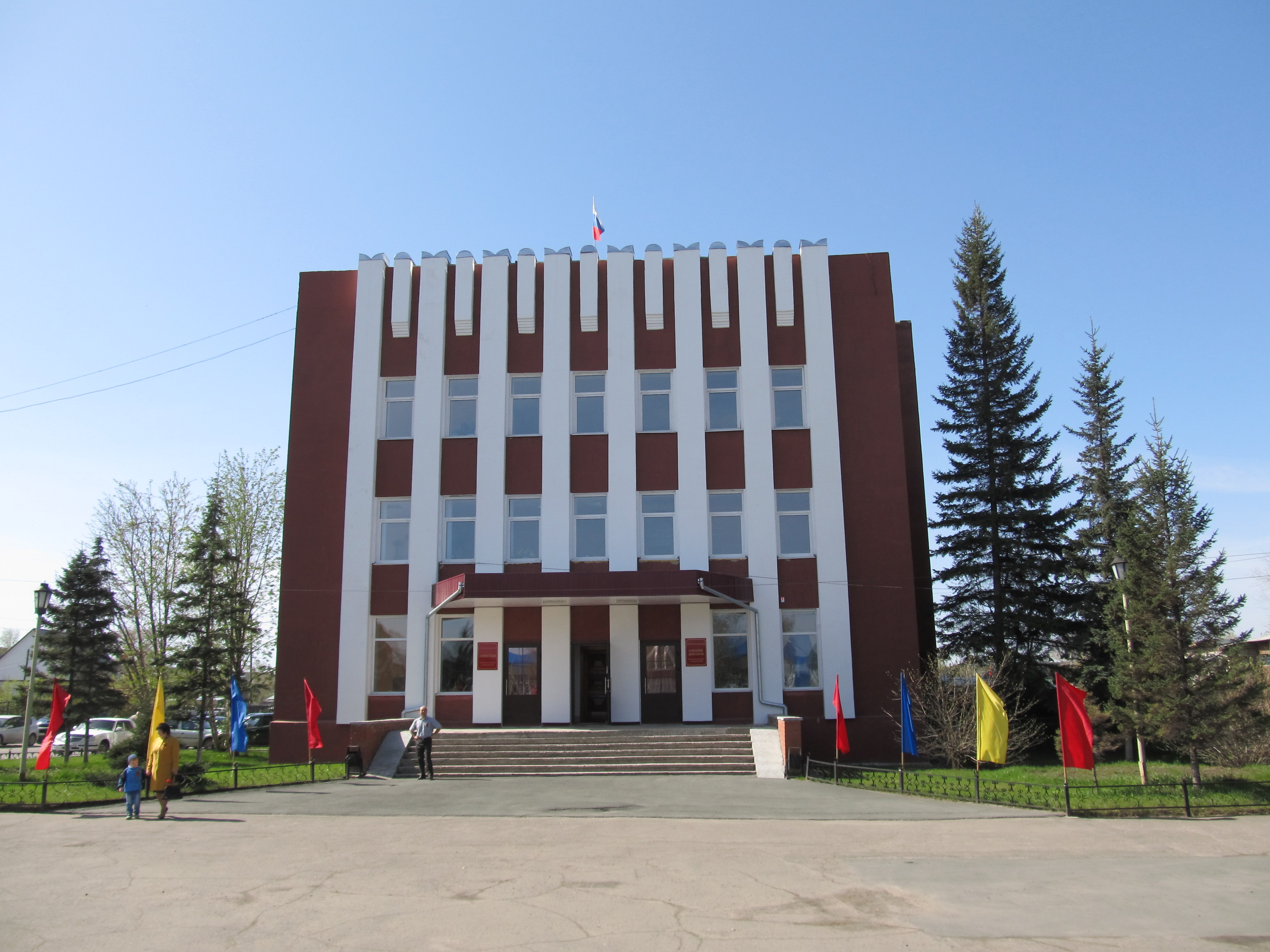
Administrative building

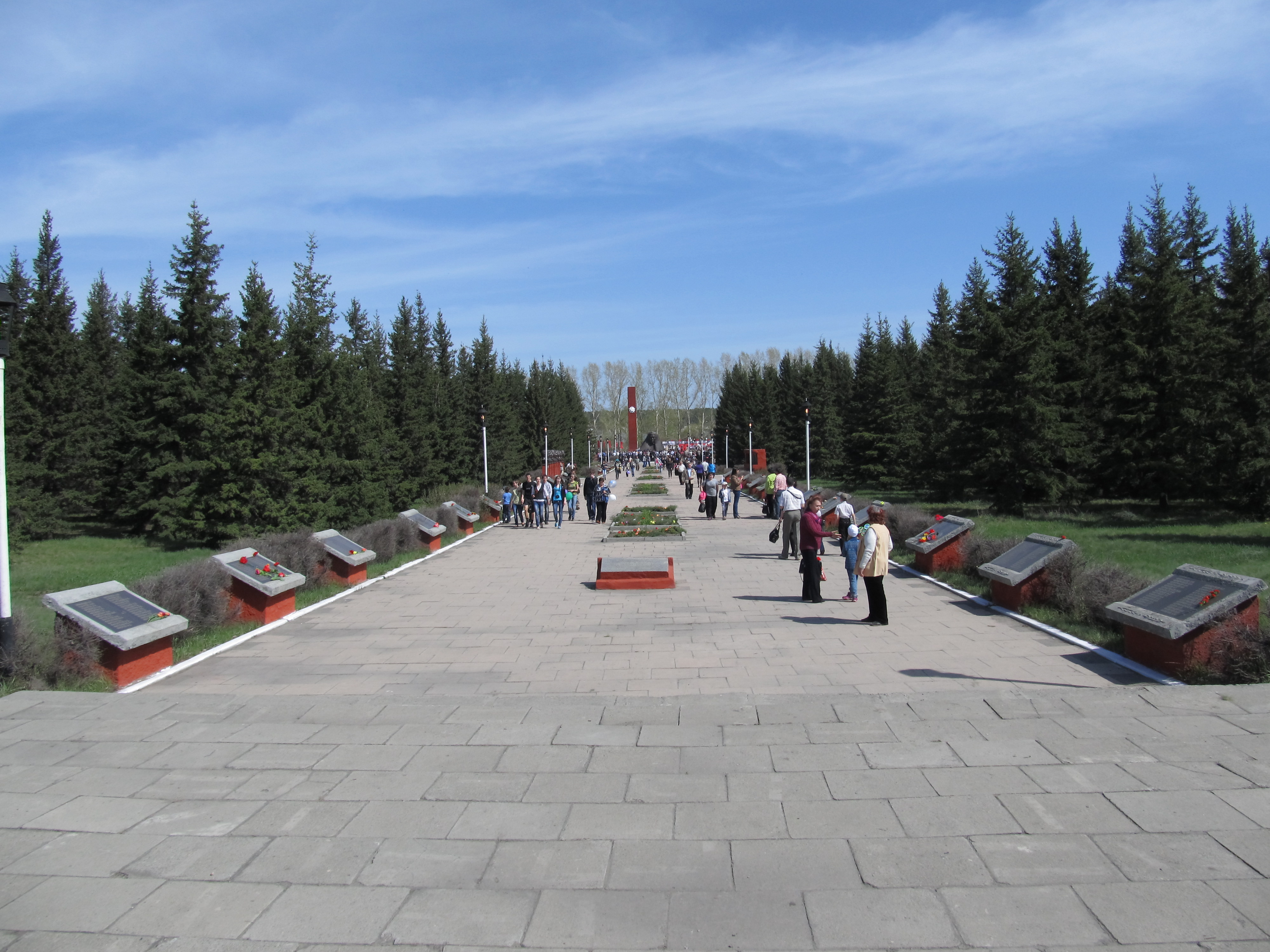
Memorial of World War II

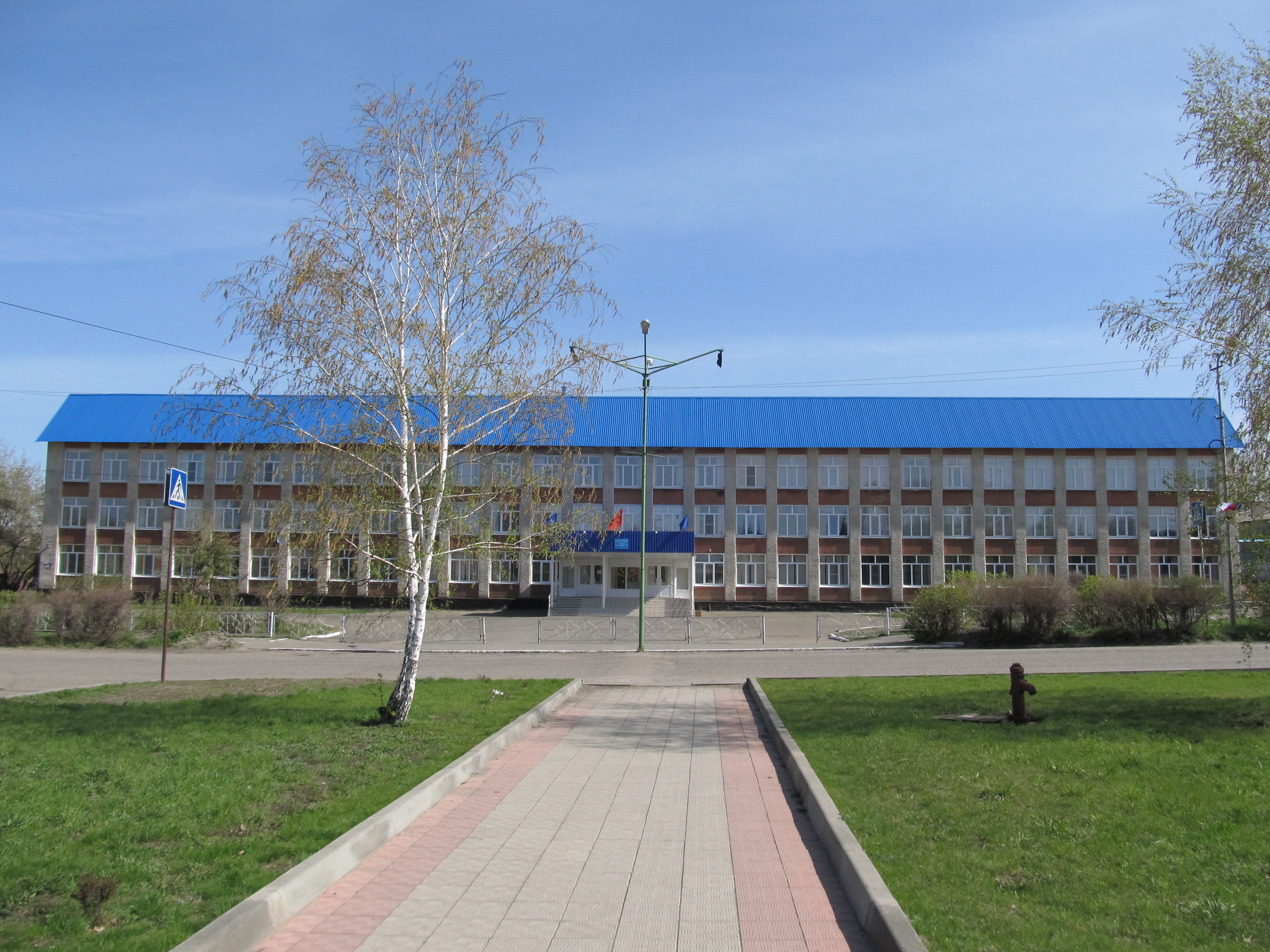
Secondary school
