= Pavlovsky District, Altai Krai =

Pavlovsky District Павловский район (Russian)
- District
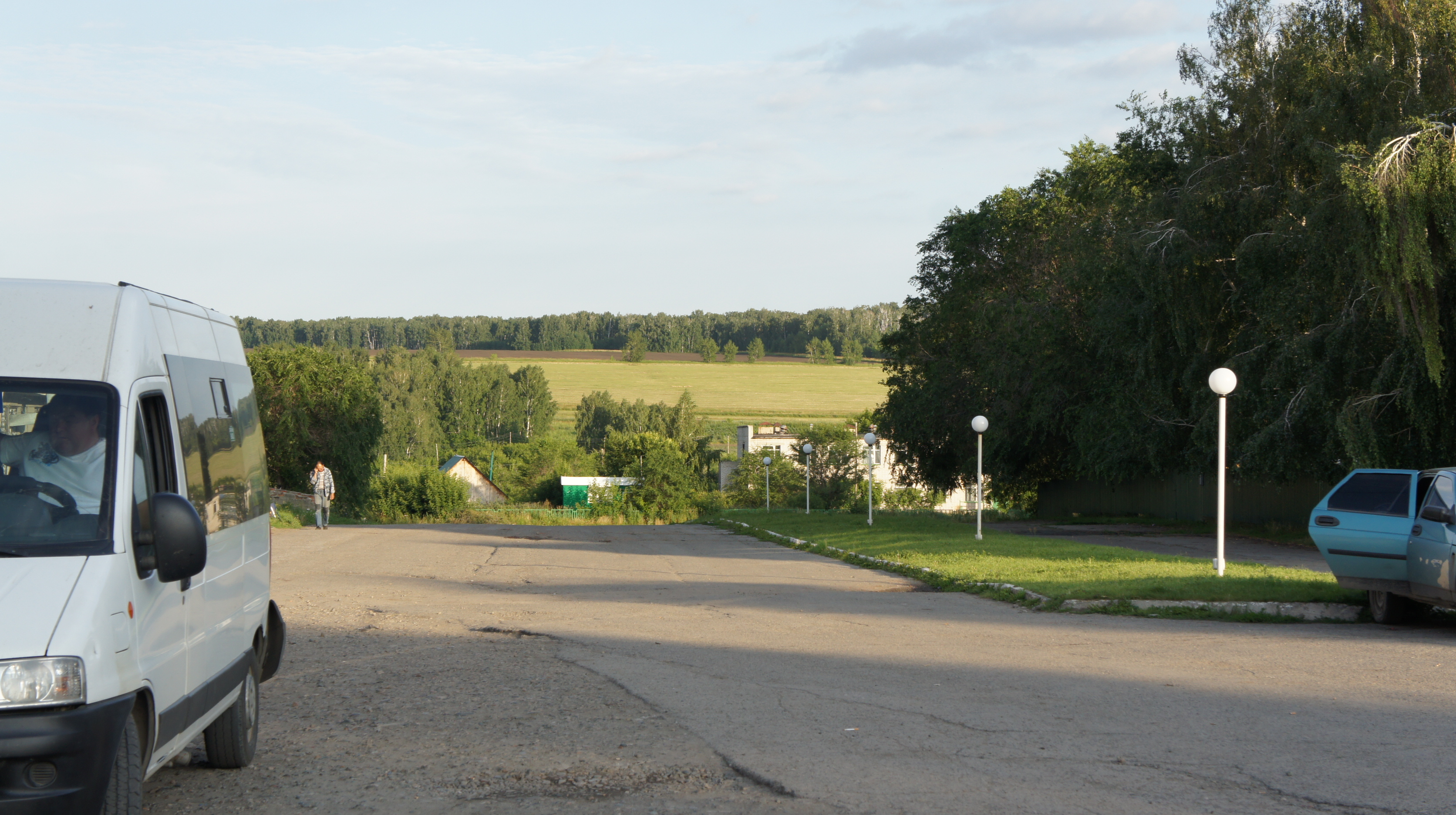
- Village Prut, Pavlovsky District
- Location of Pavlovsky District in Altai Krai
- Coordinates: 53°19′31″N 82°58′36″E
- Country: Russia
- Federal subject: Altai Krai
- Established: 1925
- Administrative center: Pavlovsk

Area
  - Total: 2,230 km^{2} (860 sq mi)

Population (2010 Census)
  - Total: 40,235
  - Density: 18.0/km^{2} (46.7/sq mi)
  - Urban: 0%
  - Rural: 100%

Administrative structure
  - Administrative divisions: 15 selsoviet
  - Inhabited localities: 34 rural localities

Municipal structure
  - Municipally incorporated as: Pavlovsky Municipal District
  - Municipal divisions: 0 urban settlements, 15 rural settlements
- Time zone: UTC+7 (MSK+4)
- OKTMO ID: 01630000
- Website: http://pavlovsk22.ru/

Pavlovsky District (Russian: Па́вловский райо́н) is an administrative and municipal district (raion), one of the fifty-nine in Altai Krai, Russia. It is located in the north of the krai. The area of the district is 2,230 square kilometers (860 sq mi). Its administrative center is the rural locality (a selo) of Pavlovsk. Population: 40,235 (2010 census); 41,495 (2002 census); 38,458 (1989 Soviet census). The population of Pavlovsk accounts for 36.1% of the district's total population.
