= Bykovo (inhabited locality) =

Bykovo (Russian: Бы́ково) is the name of several inhabited localities in Russia.

== Altai Krai ==
As of 2010, two rural localities in Altai Krai bear this name:

- Bykovo, Shelabolikhinsky District, Altai Krai, a selo in Krutishinsky Selsoviet of Shelabolikhinsky District
- Bykovo, Shipunovsky District, Altai Krai, a selo in Rossiysky Selsoviet of Shipunovsky District

== Arkhangelsk Oblast ==
As of 2010, two rural localities in Arkhangelsk Oblast bear this name:

- Bykovo, Kargopolsky District, Arkhangelsk Oblast, a village in Kalitinsky Selsoviet of Kargopolsky District
- Bykovo, Vilegodsky District, Arkhangelsk Oblast, a village in Pavlovsky Selsoviet of Vilegodsky District

== Republic of Bashkortostan ==
As of 2010, one rural locality in the Republic of Bashkortostan bears this name:

- Bykovo, Republic of Bashkortostan, a village in Staronadezhdinsky Selsoviet of Blagoveshchensky District

== Bryansk Oblast ==
As of 2010, one rural locality in Bryansk Oblast bears this name:

- Bykovo, Bryansk Oblast, a village in Sergeyevsky Selsoviet of Dubrovsky District

== Republic of Buryatia ==
As of 2010, one rural locality in the Republic of Buryatia bears this name:

- Bykovo, Republic of Buryatia, a selo in Sherginsky Selsoviet of Kabansky District

== Chelyabinsk Oblast ==
As of 2010, one rural locality in Chelyabinsk Oblast bears this name:

- Bykovo, Chelyabinsk Oblast, a village in Krutoyarsky Selsoviet of Oktyabrsky District

== Irkutsk Oblast ==
As of 2010, one rural locality in Irkutsk Oblast bears this name:

- Bykovo, Irkutsk Oblast, a settlement in Alarsky District

== Ivanovo Oblast ==
As of 2010, seven rural localities in Ivanovo Oblast bear this name:

- Bykovo, Furmanovsky District, Ivanovo Oblast, a village in Furmanovsky District
- Bykovo (Ryabovskoye Rural Settlement), Lukhsky District, Ivanovo Oblast, a village in Lukhsky District; municipally, a part of Ryabovskoye Rural Settlement of that district
- Bykovo (Porzdnevskoye Rural Settlement), Lukhsky District, Ivanovo Oblast, a village in Lukhsky District; municipally, a part of Porzdnevskoye Rural Settlement of that district
- Bykovo, Pestyakovsky District, Ivanovo Oblast, a village in Pestyakovsky District
- Bykovo, Puchezhsky District, Ivanovo Oblast, a village in Puchezhsky District
- Bykovo, Teykovsky District, Ivanovo Oblast, a village in Teykovsky District
- Bykovo, Yuzhsky District, Ivanovo Oblast, a village in Yuzhsky District

== Kaluga Oblast ==
As of 2010, three rural localities in Kaluga Oblast bear this name:

- Bykovo, Baryatinsky District, Kaluga Oblast, a village in Baryatinsky District
- Bykovo, Kuybyshevsky District, Kaluga Oblast, a village in Kuybyshevsky District
- Bykovo, Maloyaroslavetsky District, Kaluga Oblast, a village in Maloyaroslavetsky District

== Kirov Oblast ==
As of 2010, three rural localities in Kirov Oblast bear this name:

- Bykovo, Kirov, Kirov Oblast, a village under the administrative jurisdiction of Oktyabrsky City District of the City of Kirov
- Bykovo, Kumyonsky District, Kirov Oblast, a selo in Kumensky Rural Okrug of Kumyonsky District
- Bykovo, Sovetsky District, Kirov Oblast, a village in Kichminsky Rural Okrug of Sovetsky District

== Kostroma Oblast ==
As of 2010, six rural localities in Kostroma Oblast bear this name:

- Bykovo, Antropovsky District, Kostroma Oblast, a village in Kurnovskoye Settlement of Antropovsky District
- Bykovo, Krasnoselsky District, Kostroma Oblast, a village in Zakharovskoye Settlement of Krasnoselsky District
- Bykovo, Makaryevsky District, Kostroma Oblast, a village in Unzhenskoye Settlement of Makaryevsky District
- Bykovo, Ivanovskoye Settlement, Sharyinsky District, Kostroma Oblast, a village in Ivanovskoye Settlement of Sharyinsky District
- Bykovo, Ivanovskoye Settlement, Sharyinsky District, Kostroma Oblast, a village in Ivanovskoye Settlement of Sharyinsky District
- Bykovo, Troitskoye Settlement, Sharyinsky District, Kostroma Oblast, a village in Troitskoye Settlement of Sharyinsky District

== Kursk Oblast ==
As of 2010, one rural locality in Kursk Oblast bears this name:

- Bykovo, Kursk Oblast, a selo in Bykovsky Selsoviet of Gorshechensky District

== Leningrad Oblast ==
As of 2010, one rural locality in Leningrad Oblast bears this name:

- Bykovo, Leningrad Oblast, a logging depot settlement in Melnikovskoye Settlement Municipal Formation of Priozersky District

== Lipetsk Oblast ==
As of 2010, one rural locality in Lipetsk Oblast bears this name:

- Bykovo, Lipetsk Oblast, a selo in Prechistensky Selsoviet of Izmalkovsky District

== Moscow Oblast ==
As of 2010, nine inhabited localities in Moscow Oblast bear this name.

Urban localities

- Bykovo, Ramensky District, Moscow Oblast, a work settlement in Ramensky District

Rural localities

- Bykovo, Kulikovskoye Rural Settlement, Dmitrovsky District, Moscow Oblast, a village in Kulikovskoye Rural Settlement of Dmitrovsky District
- Bykovo, Dmitrov Town, Dmitrovsky District, Moscow Oblast, a village under the administrative jurisdiction of the Town of Dmitrov, Dmitrovsky District
- Bykovo, Lotoshinsky District, Moscow Oblast, a village in Mikulinskoye Rural Settlement of Lotoshinsky District
- Bykovo, Pavlovo-Posadsky District, Moscow Oblast, a village in Rakhmanovskoye Rural Settlement of Pavlovo-Posadsky District
- Bykovo, Podolsky District, Moscow Oblast, a settlement in Strelkovskoye Rural Settlement of Podolsky District
- Bykovo, Vereyskoye Rural Settlement, Ramensky District, Moscow Oblast, a selo in Vereyskoye Rural Settlement of Ramensky District
- Bykovo, Sergiyevo-Posadsky District, Moscow Oblast, a village under the administrative jurisdiction of the Town of Khotkovo, Sergiyevo-Posadsky District
- Bykovo, Volokolamsky District, Moscow Oblast, a village in Kashinskoye Rural Settlement of Volokolamsky District

== Nizhny Novgorod Oblast ==
As of 2010, five rural localities in Nizhny Novgorod Oblast bear this name:

- Bykovo, Bor, Nizhny Novgorod Oblast, a village in Lindovsky Selsoviet of the city of oblast significance of Bor
- Bykovo, Koverninsky District, Nizhny Novgorod Oblast, a village in Khokhlomsky Selsoviet of Koverninsky District
- Bykovo (selo), Loyminsky Selsoviet, Sokolsky District, Nizhny Novgorod Oblast, a selo in Loyminsky Selsoviet of Sokolsky District
- Bykovo (village), Loyminsky Selsoviet, Sokolsky District, Nizhny Novgorod Oblast, a village in Loyminsky Selsoviet of Sokolsky District
- Bykovo, Urensky District, Nizhny Novgorod Oblast, a village in Krasnogorsky Selsoviet of Urensky District

== Novgorod Oblast ==
As of 2010, six rural localities in Novgorod Oblast bear this name:

- Bykovo, Borovichsky District, Novgorod Oblast, a village in Progresskoye Settlement of Borovichsky District
- Bykovo, Lyubytinsky District, Novgorod Oblast, a village under the administrative jurisdiction of the urban-type settlement of Lyubytino, Lyubytinsky District
- Bykovo, Maryovsky District, Novgorod Oblast, a village in Molvotitskoye Settlement of Maryovsky District
- Bykovo, Bykovskoye Settlement, Pestovsky District, Novgorod Oblast, a village in Bykovskoye Settlement of Pestovsky District
- Bykovo, Vyatskoye Settlement, Pestovsky District, Novgorod Oblast, a village in Vyatskoye Settlement of Pestovsky District
- Bykovo, Valdaysky District, Novgorod Oblast, a village in Kostkovskoye Settlement of Valdaysky District

== Novosibirsk Oblast ==
As of 2010, one rural locality in Novosibirsk Oblast bears this name:

- Bykovo, Novosibirsk Oblast, a selo in Novosibirsky District

== Perm Krai ==
As of 2010, one rural locality in Perm Krai bears this name:

- Bykovo, Perm Krai, a village in Sivinsky District

== Pskov Oblast ==
As of 2010, eleven rural localities in Pskov Oblast bear this name:

- Bykovo, Bezhanitsky District, Pskov Oblast, a village in Bezhanitsky District
- Bykovo, Dnovsky District, Pskov Oblast, a village in Dnovsky District
- Bykovo (Ushchitskaya Rural Settlement), Kunyinsky District, Pskov Oblast, a village in Kunyinsky District; municipally, a part of Ushchitskaya Rural Settlement of that district
- Bykovo (Slepnevskaya Rural Settlement), Kunyinsky District, Pskov Oblast, a village in Kunyinsky District; municipally, a part of Slepnevskaya Rural Settlement of that district
- Bykovo, Nevelsky District, Pskov Oblast, a village in Nevelsky District
- Bykovo, Opochetsky District, Pskov Oblast, a village in Opochetsky District
- Bykovo, Plyussky District, Pskov Oblast, a village in Plyussky District
- Bykovo, Porkhovsky District, Pskov Oblast, a village in Porkhovsky District
- Bykovo, Pushkinogorsky District, Pskov Oblast, a village in Pushkinogorsky District
- Bykovo (Zabelskaya Rural Settlement), Pustoshkinsky District, Pskov Oblast, a village in Pustoshkinsky District; municipally, a part of Zabelskaya Rural Settlement of that district
- Bykovo (Alolskaya Rural Settlement), Pustoshkinsky District, Pskov Oblast, a village in Pustoshkinsky District; municipally, a part of Alolskaya Rural Settlement of that district

== Ryazan Oblast ==
As of 2010, four rural localities in Ryazan Oblast bear this name:

- Bykovo, Belovsky Rural Okrug, Klepikovsky District, Ryazan Oblast, a village in Belovsky Rural Okrug of Klepikovsky District
- Bykovo, Gureyevsky Rural Okrug, Klepikovsky District, Ryazan Oblast, a village in Gureyevsky Rural Okrug of Klepikovsky District
- Bykovo, Korablinsky District, Ryazan Oblast, a village in Krasnensky Rural Okrug of Korablinsky District
- Bykovo, Starozhilovsky District, Ryazan Oblast, a village in Stolpnyansky Rural Okrug of Starozhilovsky District

== Smolensk Oblast ==
As of 2010, eight rural localities in Smolensk Oblast bear this name:

- Bykovo, Dorogobuzhsky District, Smolensk Oblast, a village in Balakirevskoye Rural Settlement of Dorogobuzhsky District
- Bykovo, Kholm-Zhirkovsky District, Smolensk Oblast, a village in Tomskoye Rural Settlement of Kholm-Zhirkovsky District
- Bykovo, Novoduginsky District, Smolensk Oblast, a village in Tesovskoye Rural Settlement of Novoduginsky District
- Bykovo, Pochinkovsky District, Smolensk Oblast, a village in Losnenskoye Rural Settlement of Pochinkovsky District
- Bykovo, Safonovsky District, Smolensk Oblast, a village in Pushkinskoye Rural Settlement of Safonovsky District
- Bykovo, Kasnyanskoye Rural Settlement, Vyazemsky District, Smolensk Oblast, a village in Kasnyanskoye Rural Settlement of Vyazemsky District
- Bykovo, Kaydakovskoye Rural Settlement, Vyazemsky District, Smolensk Oblast, a village in Kaydakovskoye Rural Settlement of Vyazemsky District
- Bykovo, Novoselskoye Rural Settlement, Vyazemsky District, Smolensk Oblast, a village in Novoselskoye Rural Settlement of Vyazemsky District

== Sverdlovsk Oblast ==
As of 2010, one rural locality in Sverdlovsk Oblast bears this name:

- Bykovo, Sverdlovsk Oblast, a selo in Achitsky District

== Tomsk Oblast ==
As of 2010, one rural locality in Tomsk Oblast bears this name:

- Bykovo, Tomsk Oblast, a village in Tomsky District

== Tver Oblast ==
As of 2010, fourteen rural localities in Tver Oblast bear this name:

- Bykovo, Belsky District, Tver Oblast, a village in Belsky District
- Bykovo, Bezhetsky District, Tver Oblast, a village in Bezhetsky District
- Bykovo (Kablukovskoye Rural Settlement), Kalininsky District, Tver Oblast, a village in Kalininsky District; municipally, a part of Kablukovskoye Rural Settlement of that district
- Bykovo (Verkhnevolzhskoye Rural Settlement), Kalininsky District, Tver Oblast, a village in Kalininsky District; municipally, a part of Verkhnevolzhskoye Rural Settlement of that district
- Bykovo, Kalyazinsky District, Tver Oblast, a village in Kalyazinsky District
- Bykovo, Kesovogorsky District, Tver Oblast, a village in Kesovogorsky District
- Bykovo, Kimrsky District, Tver Oblast, a village in Kimrsky District
- Bykovo, Rameshkovsky District, Tver Oblast, a village in Rameshkovsky District
- Bykovo (Larionovskoye Rural Settlement), Selizharovsky District, Tver Oblast, a village in Selizharovsky District; municipally, a part of Larionovskoye Rural Settlement of that district
- Bykovo (Zakharovskoye Rural Settlement), Selizharovsky District, Tver Oblast, a village in Selizharovsky District; municipally, a part of Zakharovskoye Rural Settlement of that district
- Bykovo, Staritsky District, Tver Oblast, a village in Staritsky District
- Bykovo, Udomelsky District, Tver Oblast, a village in Udomelsky District
- Bykovo, Zapadnodvinsky District, Tver Oblast, a village in Zapadnodvinsky District
- Bykovo, Zubtsovsky District, Tver Oblast, a village in Zubtsovsky District

== Vladimir Oblast ==
As of 2010, one rural locality in Vladimir Oblast bears this name:

- Bykovo, Vladimir Oblast, a village in Sudogodsky District

== Volgograd Oblast ==
As of 2010, one urban locality in Volgograd Oblast bears this name:

- Bykovo, Volgograd Oblast, a work settlement in Bykovsky District

== Vologda Oblast ==
As of 2010, ten rural localities in Vologda Oblast bear this name:

- Bykovo, Cherepovetsky District, Vologda Oblast, a village in Myaksinsky Selsoviet of Cherepovetsky District
- Bykovo, Gryazovetsky District, Vologda Oblast, a village in Komyansky Selsoviet of Gryazovetsky District
- Bykovo, Kharovsky District, Vologda Oblast, a village in Kharovsky Selsoviet of Kharovsky District
- Bykovo, Kirillovsky District, Vologda Oblast, a village in Sukhoverkhovsky Selsoviet of Kirillovsky District
- Bykovo, Nyuksensky District, Vologda Oblast, a village in Kosmarevsky Selsoviet of Nyuksensky District
- Bykovo, Sokolsky District, Vologda Oblast, a village in Zamoshsky Selsoviet of Sokolsky District
- Bykovo, Totemsky District, Vologda Oblast, a village in Pogorelovsky Selsoviet of Totemsky District
- Bykovo, Velikoustyugsky District, Vologda Oblast, a village in Viktorovsky Selsoviet of Velikoustyugsky District
- Bykovo, Vozhegodsky District, Vologda Oblast, a village in Beketovsky Selsoviet of Vozhegodsky District
- Bykovo, Vytegorsky District, Vologda Oblast, a village in Megorsky Selsoviet of Vytegorsky District

== Yaroslavl Oblast ==
As of 2010, two rural localities in Yaroslavl Oblast bear this name:

- Bykovo, Nekouzsky District, Yaroslavl Oblast, a mestechko in Spassky Rural Okrug of Nekouzsky District
- Bykovo, Rybinsky District, Yaroslavl Oblast, a village in Kamennikovsky Rural Okrug of Rybinsky District

== Zabaykalsky Krai ==
As of 2010, one rural locality in Zabaykalsky Krai bears this name:

- Bykovo, Zabaykalsky Krai, a selo in Krasnochikoysky District
