= Gumerovo =

Gumerovo (Russian: Гумерово) is the name of several rural localities in the Republic of Bashkortostan, Russia:

- Gumerovo, Aurgazinsky District, Republic of Bashkortostan, a village in Tashtamaksky Selsoviet of Aurgazinsky District
- Gumerovo, Baymaksky District, Republic of Bashkortostan, a village in Yaratovsky Selsoviet of Baymaksky District
- Gumerovo, Blagoveshchensky District, Republic of Bashkortostan, a village in Ilikovsky Selsoviet of Blagoveshchensky District
- Gumerovo, Burayevsky District, Republic of Bashkortostan, a village in Azyakovsky Selsoviet of Burayevsky District
- Gumerovo, Davlekanovsky District, Republic of Bashkortostan, a village in Kadyrgulovsky Selsoviet of Davlekanovsky District
- Gumerovo, Ishimbaysky District, Republic of Bashkortostan, a village in Petrovsky Selsoviet of Ishimbaysky District
- Gumerovo, Kushnarenkovsky District, Republic of Bashkortostan, a village in Gorkovsky Selsoviet of Kushnarenkovsky District
- Gumerovo, Mechetlinsky District, Republic of Bashkortostan, a village in Duvan-Mechetlinsky Selsoviet of Mechetlinsky District
