= Bykovsky =

Bykovsky (masculine), Bykovskaya (feminine), or Bykovskoye (neuter) may refer to:

- Bykovsky District, a district of Volgograd Oblast, Russia
- Bykovsky (rural locality), name of several rural localities in Russia
- Bykovsky channel, a major distributary of the Lena River
- Bykovsky (surname)
- Bykovsky Peninsula, in Laptev Sea

== See also ==
- Bykovo (disambiguation)
- Bykowski, a surname
