= Kazanka, Blagoveshchensky District, Republic of Bashkortostan =

Kazanka Казанка
- Village
- Location within Bashkortostan Location within Russia
- Coordinates: 55°14′N 56°23′E
- Country: Russia
- Region: Bashkortostan
- District: Blagoveshchensky District
- Time zone: UTC+5:00

Kazanka (Russian: Казанка) is a rural locality (a village) in Pokrovsky Selsoviet, Blagoveshchensky District, Bashkortostan, Russia. The population was 40 as of 2010. There is 1 street.

== Geography ==
Kazanka is located 47 km northeast of Blagoveshchensk (the district's administrative centre) by road. Staronadezhdino is the nearest rural locality.
