= Bedeyeva Polyana =

Bedeyeva Polyana Бедеева Поляна
- Selo
- Location within Bashkortostan Location within Russia
- Coordinates: 55°19′N 56°22′E
- Country: Russia
- Region: Bashkortostan
- District: Blagoveshchensky District

Population (2010)
  - Total: 1,757
- Time zone: UTC+5:00
- Postal code: 453446

Bedeyeva Polyana (Russian: Бедеева Поляна) is a rural locality (a selo) and the administrative centre of Bedeyevo-Polyansky Selsoviet, Blagoveshchensky District, Bashkortostan, Russia. The population was 1,757 as of 2010. There are 17 streets.

== Geography ==
Bedeyeva Polyana is located 48 km northeast of Blagoveshchensk (the district's administrative centre) by road. Pushkino is the nearest rural locality.
