= Udelno-Duvaney =

Udelno-Duvaney Удельно-Дуваней
- Selo
- Location within Bashkortostan Location within Russia
- Coordinates: 55°10′N 55°50′E
- Country: Russia
- Region: Bashkortostan
- District: Blagoveshchensky District

Population (2010)
  - Total: 1,079
- Time zone: UTC+5:00
- Postal code: 453442

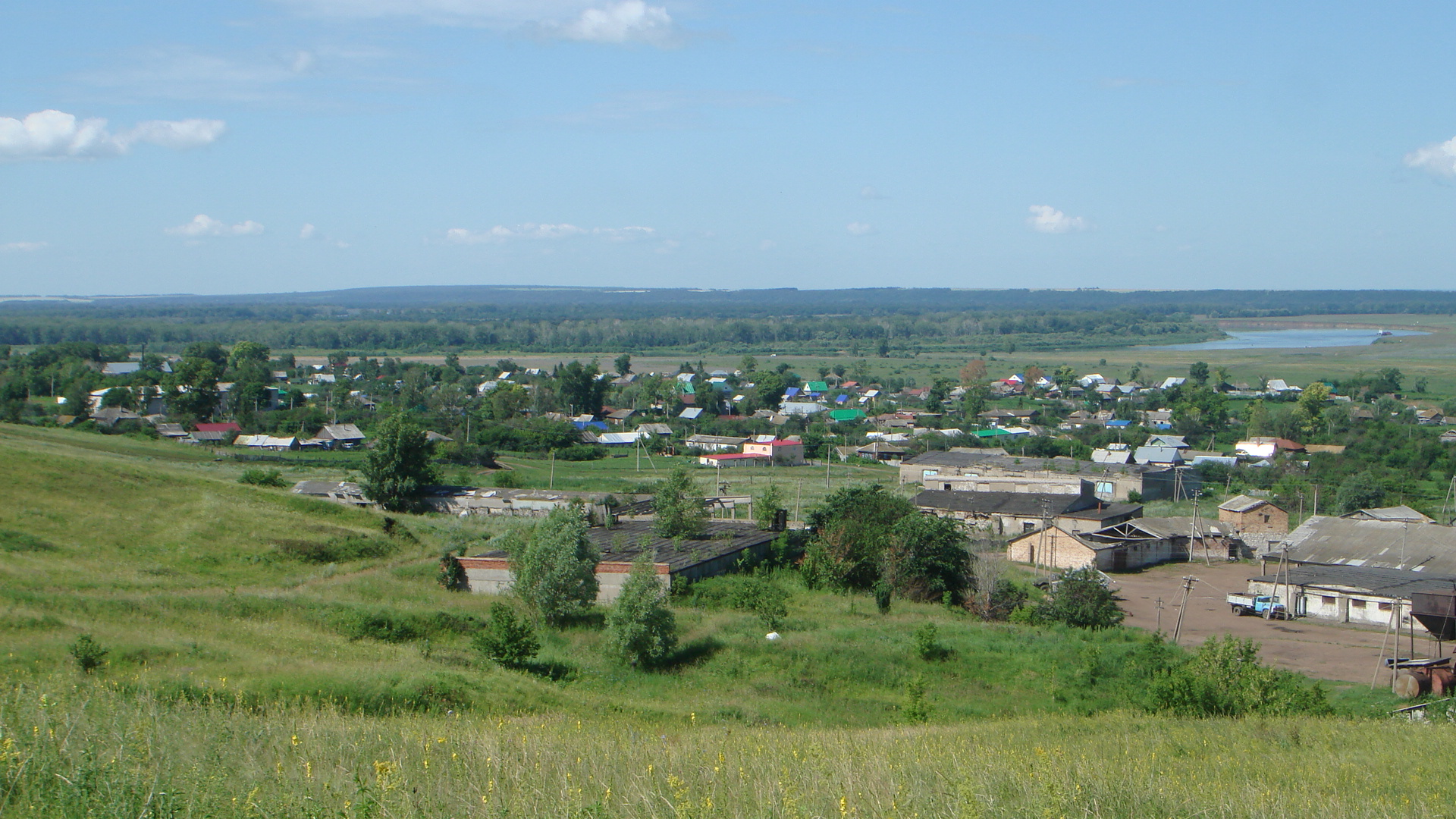

Udelno-Duvaney (Russian: Удельно-Дуваней; Bashkir: Удельно-Дыуанай, Udelno-Dıwanay) is a rural locality (a selo) and the administrative centre of Udelno-Duvaneysky Selsoviet, Blagoveshchensky District, Bashkortostan, Russia. The population was 1,079 as of 2010. There are 27 streets.

== Geography ==
Udelno-Duvaney is located on the right bank of the Belaya River, 19 km north of Blagoveshchensk (the district's administrative centre) by road. Ilyinsky is the nearest rural locality.
