= Osipovka =

Osipovka Осиповка
- Selo
- Location within Bashkortostan Location within Russia
- Coordinates: 55°28′N 56°22′E
- Country: Russia
- Region: Bashkortostan
- District: Blagoveshchensky District

Population (2010)
  - Total: 364
- Time zone: UTC+5:00
- Postal code: 453455

Osipovka (Russian: Осиповка) is a rural locality (a selo) and the administrative centre of Oktyabrsky Selsoviet, Blagoveshchensky District, Bashkortostan, Russia. The population was 364 as of 2010. There are 7 streets.

== Geography ==
Osipovka is located 72 km northeast of Blagoveshchensk (the district's administrative centre) by road. Usabash is the nearest rural locality.
