= Staroilikovo, Blagoveshchensky District, Republic of Bashkortostan =

Staroilikovo Староиликово
- Selo
- Location within Bashkortostan Location within Russia
- Coordinates: 55°20′N 56°14′E
- Country: Russia
- Region: Bashkortostan
- District: Blagoveshchensky District

Population (2010)
  - Total: 356
- Time zone: UTC+5:00
- Postal code: 453456

Staroilikovo (Russian: Староиликово; Bashkir: Иҫке Илек, İśke İlek) is a rural locality (a selo) and the administrative centre of Ilikovsky Selsoviet, Blagoveshchensky District, Bashkortostan, Russia. The population was 356 as of 2010. There are 5 streets.

== Geography ==
Staroilikovo is located 51 km northeast of Blagoveshchensk (the district's administrative centre) by road. Gumerovo is the nearest rural locality.
