= Ilyino-Polyana =

Ilyino-Polyana Ильино-Поляна
- Selo
- Location within Bashkortostan Location within Russia
- Coordinates: 55°02′N 56°11′E
- Country: Russia
- Region: Bashkortostan
- District: Blagoveshchensky District

Population (2010)
  - Total: 2,039
- Time zone: UTC+5:00
- Postal code: 453447

Ilyino-Polyana (Russian: Ильино-Поляна) is a rural locality (a selo) and the administrative centre of Ilyino-Polyansky Selsoviet, Blagoveshchensky District, Bashkortostan, Russia. The population was 2,039 as of 2010. There are 11 streets.

== Geography ==
Ilyino-Polyana is located 19 km east of Blagoveshchensk (the district's administrative centre) by road. Turushla is the nearest rural locality.
