= Verkhny Izyak =

Verkhny Izyak Верхний Изяк
- Selo
- Location within Bashkortostan Location within Russia
- Coordinates: 54°59′N 56°14′E
- Country: Russia
- Region: Bashkortostan
- District: Blagoveshchensky District

Population (2010)
  - Total: 558
- Time zone: UTC+5:00
- Postal code: 453457

Verkhny Izyak (Russian: Верхний Изяк; Bashkir: Үрге Иҙәк, Ürge İźäk; Meadow Mari: Кӱшыл Ӱзек, Küšyl Üzek) is a rural locality (a selo) and the administrative centre of Izyaksky Selsoviet, Blagoveshchensky District, Bashkortostan, Russia. The population was 558 as of 2010. There are 9 streets.

== Geography ==
Verkhny Izyak is located 27 km southeast of Blagoveshchensk (the district's administrative centre) by road. Tornovka is the nearest rural locality.
