= Yezhovka =

Yezhovka Ежовка
- Selo
- Location within Bashkortostan Location within Russia
- Coordinates: 55°24′N 56°18′E
- Country: Russia
- Region: Bashkortostan
- District: Blagoveshchensky District
- Time zone: UTC+5:00

Yezhovka (Russian: Ежовка) is a rural locality (a selo) in Oktyabrsky Selsoviet, Blagoveshchensky District, Bashkortostan, Russia. The population was 84 as of 2010. There are 4 streets.

== Geography ==
Yezhovka is located 73 km northeast of Blagoveshchensk (the district's administrative centre) by road. Usabash is the nearest rural locality.
