= Bolshoy Log, Republic of Bashkortostan =

Bolshoy Log Большой Лог
- Village
- Location within Bashkortostan Location within Russia
- Coordinates: 55°30′N 56°19′E
- Country: Russia
- Region: Bashkortostan
- District: Blagoveshchensky District
- Time zone: UTC+5:00

Bolshoy Log (Russian: Большой Лог) is a rural locality (a village) in Oktyabrsky Selsoviet, Blagoveshchensky District, Bashkortostan, Russia. The population was 10 as of 2010. There is 1 street.

== Geography ==
Bolshoy Log is located 75 km northeast of Blagoveshchensk (the district's administrative centre) by road. Mukhametdinovo is the nearest rural locality.
