= Sharipovka =

Sharipovka Шариповка
- Village
- Location within Bashkortostan Location within Russia
- Coordinates: 54°58′N 56°11′E
- Country: Russia
- Region: Bashkortostan
- District: Blagoveshchensky District
- Time zone: UTC+5:00

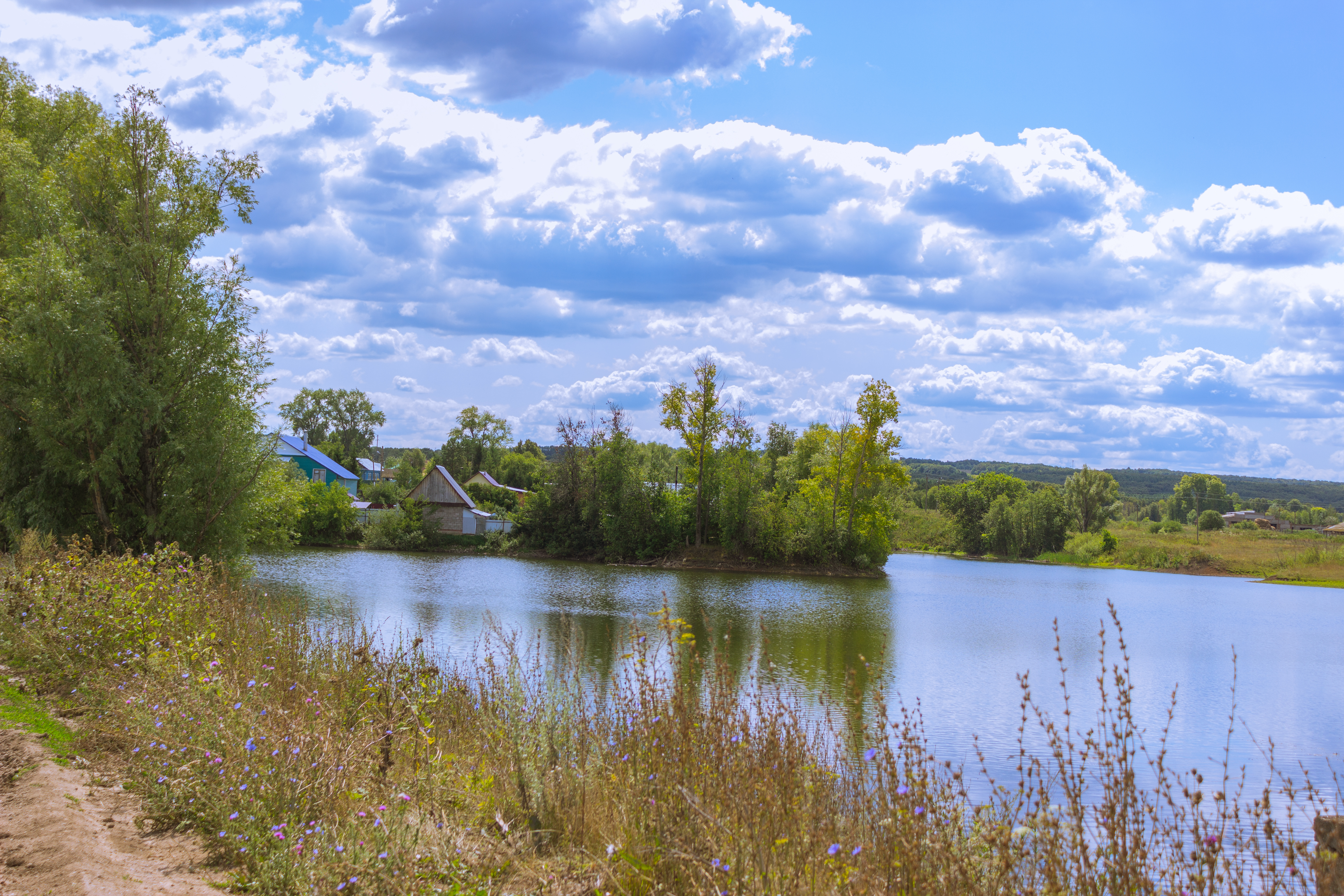
village of Sharipovka, Republic of Bashkortostan.

Sharipovka (Russian: Шариповка; Bashkir: Шәрип, Şärip) is a rural locality (a village) in Izyaksky Selsoviet, Blagoveshchensky District, Bashkortostan, Russia. The population was 93 as of 2010. There are 3 streets.

== Geography ==
Sharipovka is located 31 km southeast of Blagoveshchensk (the district's administrative centre) by road. Gorny Urazbay is the nearest rural locality.
