= Varyaz =

Varyaz Варьяз
- Village
- Location within Bashkortostan Location within Russia
- Coordinates: 55°06′N 56°28′E
- Country: Russia
- Region: Bashkortostan
- District: Blagoveshchensky District
- Time zone: UTC+5:00

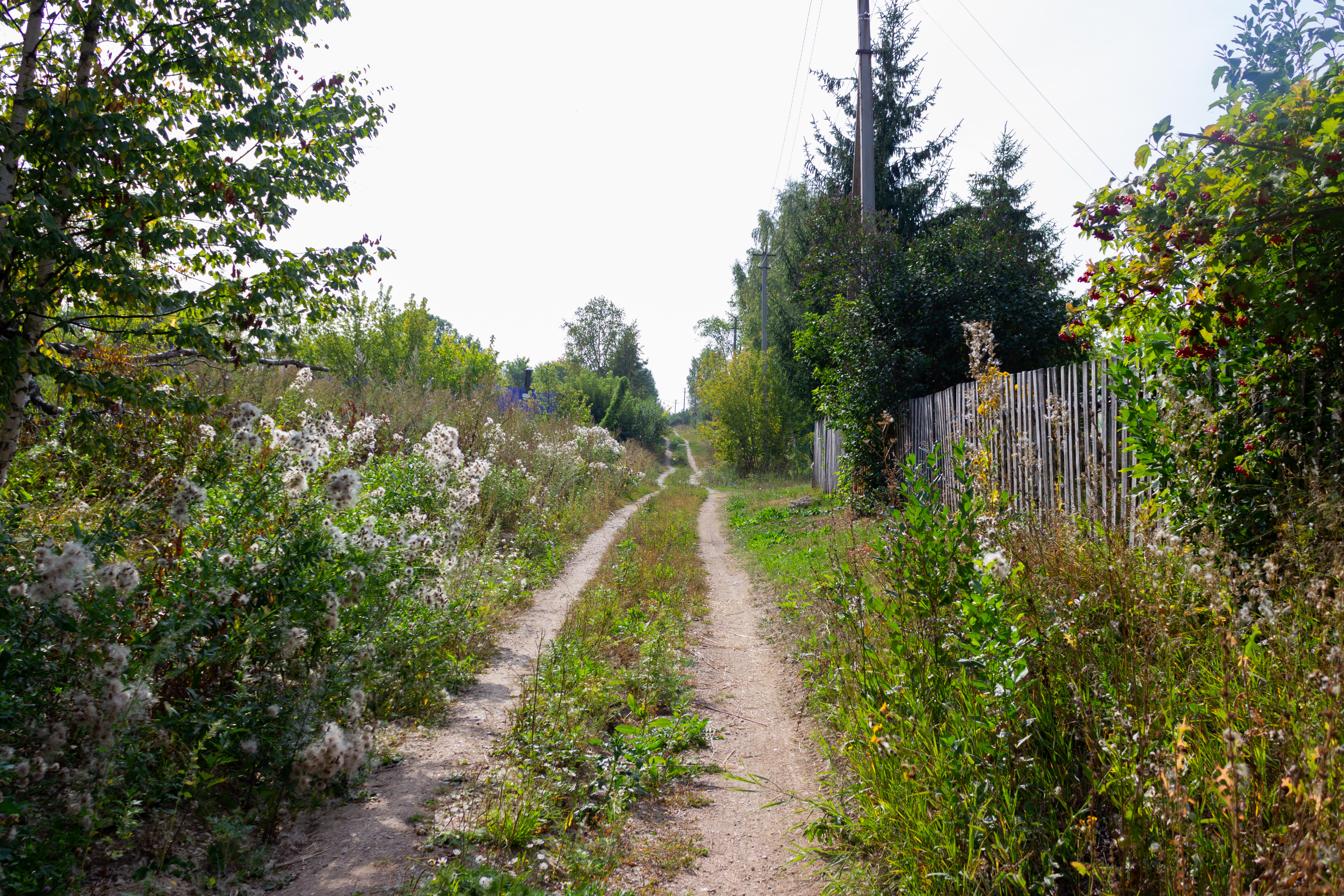
Village of Varyaz

Varyaz (Russian: Варьяз) is a rural locality (a village) in Staronadezhdinsky Selsoviet, Blagoveshchensky District, Bashkortostan, Russia. The population was 12 as of 2010. There are 2 streets.

== Geography ==
Varyaz is located 43 km northeast of Blagoveshchensk (the district's administrative centre) by road. Vladimirovka is the nearest rural locality.
