= Anninsky (inhabited locality) =

Anninsky (Russian: Аннинский; masculine), Anninskaya (Аннинская; feminine), or Anninskoye (Аннинское; neuter) is the name of several rural localities in Russia:

- Anninsky (rural locality), a pochinok in Smetaninsky Rural Okrug of Sanchursky District of Kirov Oblast
- Anninskoye, Pskov Oblast, a village in Sebezhsky District of Pskov Oblast
- Anninskoye, Tver Oblast, a village in Lukinskoye Rural Settlement of Sandovsky District of Tver Oblast
- Anninskoye, Vologda Oblast, a village in Komyansky Selsoviet of Gryazovetsky District of Vologda Oblast
- Anninskaya, a village in Staronadezhdinsky Selsoviet of Blagoveshchensky District of the Republic of Bashkortostan
