= Tuktarovo =

Tuktarovo Туктарово
- Village
- Location within Bashkortostan Location within Russia
- Coordinates: 55°06′N 56°21′E
- Country: Russia
- Region: Bashkortostan
- District: Blagoveshchensky District
- Time zone: UTC+5:00

Tuktarovo (Russian: Туктарово; Bashkir: Туҡтар, Tuqtar) is a rural locality (a village) in Volkovsky Selsoviet, Blagoveshchensky District, Bashkortostan, Russia. The population was 172 as of 2010. There are 2 streets.

== Geography ==
Tuktarovo is located 33 km east of Blagoveshchensk (the district's administrative centre) by road. Preobrazhenskoye is the nearest rural locality.
