= Troshkino =

Troshkino Трошкино
- Village
- Location within Bashkortostan Location within Russia
- Coordinates: 55°07′N 56°07′E
- Country: Russia
- Region: Bashkortostan
- District: Blagoveshchensky District
- Time zone: UTC+5:00

Troshkino (Russian: Трошкино) is a rural locality (a village) in Novonadezhdinsky Selsoviet, Blagoveshchensky District, Bashkortostan, Russia. The population was 284 as of 2010. There are 3 streets.

== Geography ==
Troshkino is located 19 km northeast of Blagoveshchensk (the district's administrative centre) by road. Sedovka is the nearest rural locality.
