= Truzhenik =

Truzhenik Труженик
- Village
- Location within Bashkortostan Location within Russia
- Coordinates: 55°10′N 56°00′E
- Country: Russia
- Region: Bashkortostan
- District: Blagoveshchensky District
- Time zone: UTC+5:00

Truzhenik (Russian: Труженик) is a rural locality (a village) in Orlovsky Selsoviet, Blagoveshchensky District, Bashkortostan, Russia. The population was 39 as of 2010. There is 1 street.

== Geography ==
Truzhenik is located 24 km north of Blagoveshchensk (the district's administrative centre) by road. Orlovka is the nearest rural locality.
