= Turushla =

Turushla Турушла
- Village
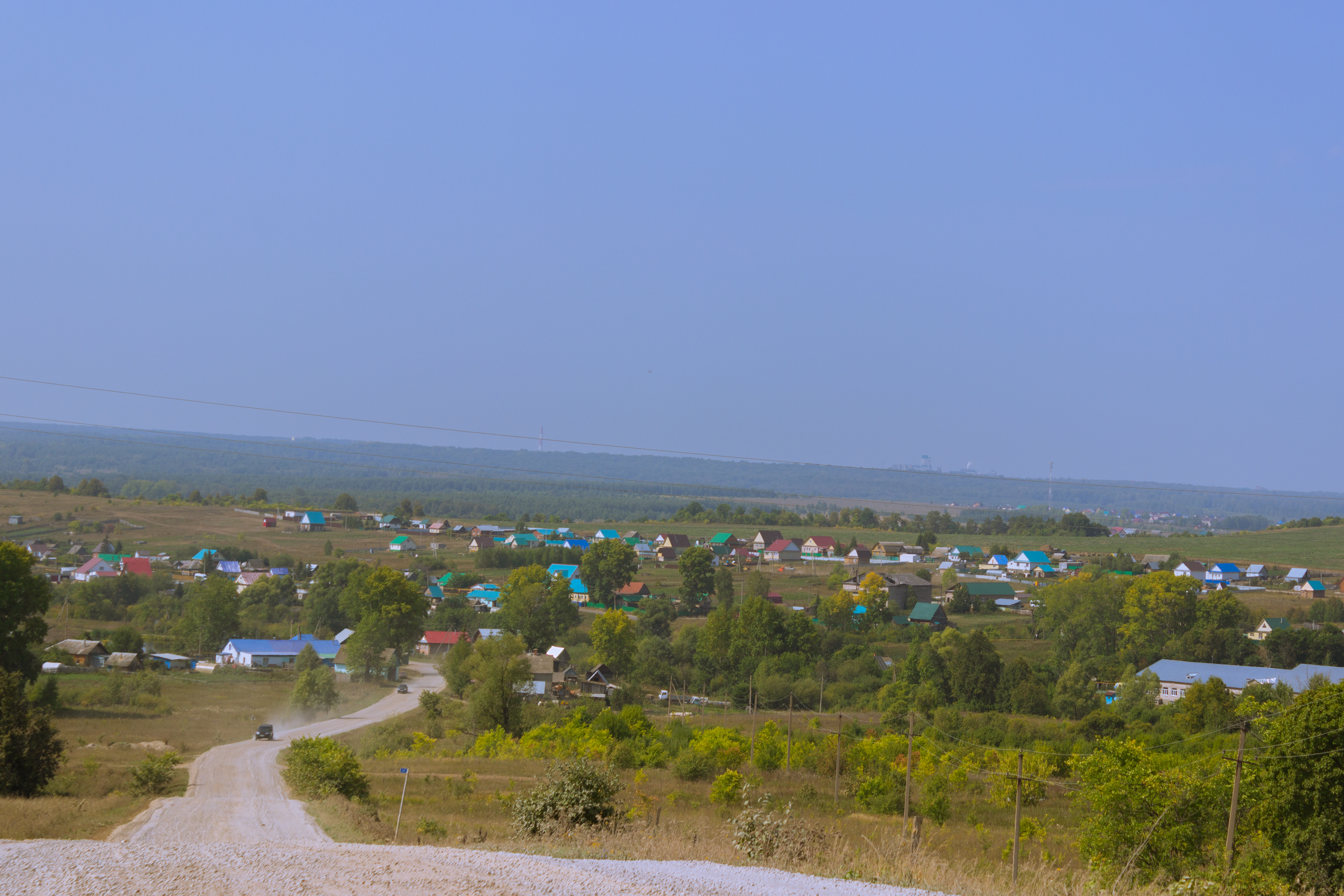
- View of Turushla

- Location within Bashkortostan Location within Russia
- Coordinates: 55°01′N 56°13′E
- Country: Russia
- Region: Bashkortostan
- District: Blagoveshchensky District

Population (2010)
  - Total: 351
- Time zone: UTC+5:00
- Postal code: 453448

Turushla (Russian: Турушла; Bashkir: Төрөшлө, Töröşlö) is a rural locality (a village) in Ilyino-Polyansky Selsoviet, Blagoveshchensky District, Bashkortostan, Russia. The population was 351 as of 2010. There are 3 streets.

== Geography ==
Turushla is located 22 km east of Blagoveshchensk (the district's administrative centre) by road. Pekarskaya is the nearest rural locality.
