= Emanino =

Emanino Эманино
- Village
- Location within Bashkortostan Location within Russia
- Coordinates: 55°17′N 56°41′E
- Country: Russia
- Region: Bashkortostan
- District: Blagoveshchensky District
- Time zone: UTC+5:00

Emanino (Russian: Эманино; Bashkir: Эманин, Emanin) is a rural locality (a village) in Bedeyevo-Polyansky Selsoviet, Blagoveshchensky District, Bashkortostan, Russia. The population was 79 as of 2010. There is 1 street.

== Geography ==
Emanino is located 84 km northeast of Blagoveshchensk (the district's administrative centre) by road. Bulychevo is the nearest rural locality.
