= 2nd Alexandrovka =

2nd Alexandrovka 2-я Александровская 2-се Александровка 2-se Aleksandrovka
- Village
- Location within Bashkortostan Location within Russia
- Coordinates: 55.055278°N 56.285833°E
- Country: Russia
- Region: Bashkortostan
- District: Blagoveshchensky District
- Time zone: UTC+05:00

2nd Alexandrovka (Russian: 2-я Александровская; Bashkir: 2-се Александровка, 2-se Aleksandrovka) is a rural locality (a village) in Ilyino-Polyansky Selsoviet of Blagoveshchensky District, Russia. The population was 13 as of 2010.

== Geography ==
2nd Alexandrovka is located 35 km northeast of Blagoveshchensk (the district's administrative centre) by road.

== Streets ==
- Alexandrovskaya
