= Tugay, Blagoveshchensky District, Republic of Bashkortostan =

Tugay Тугай
- Selo
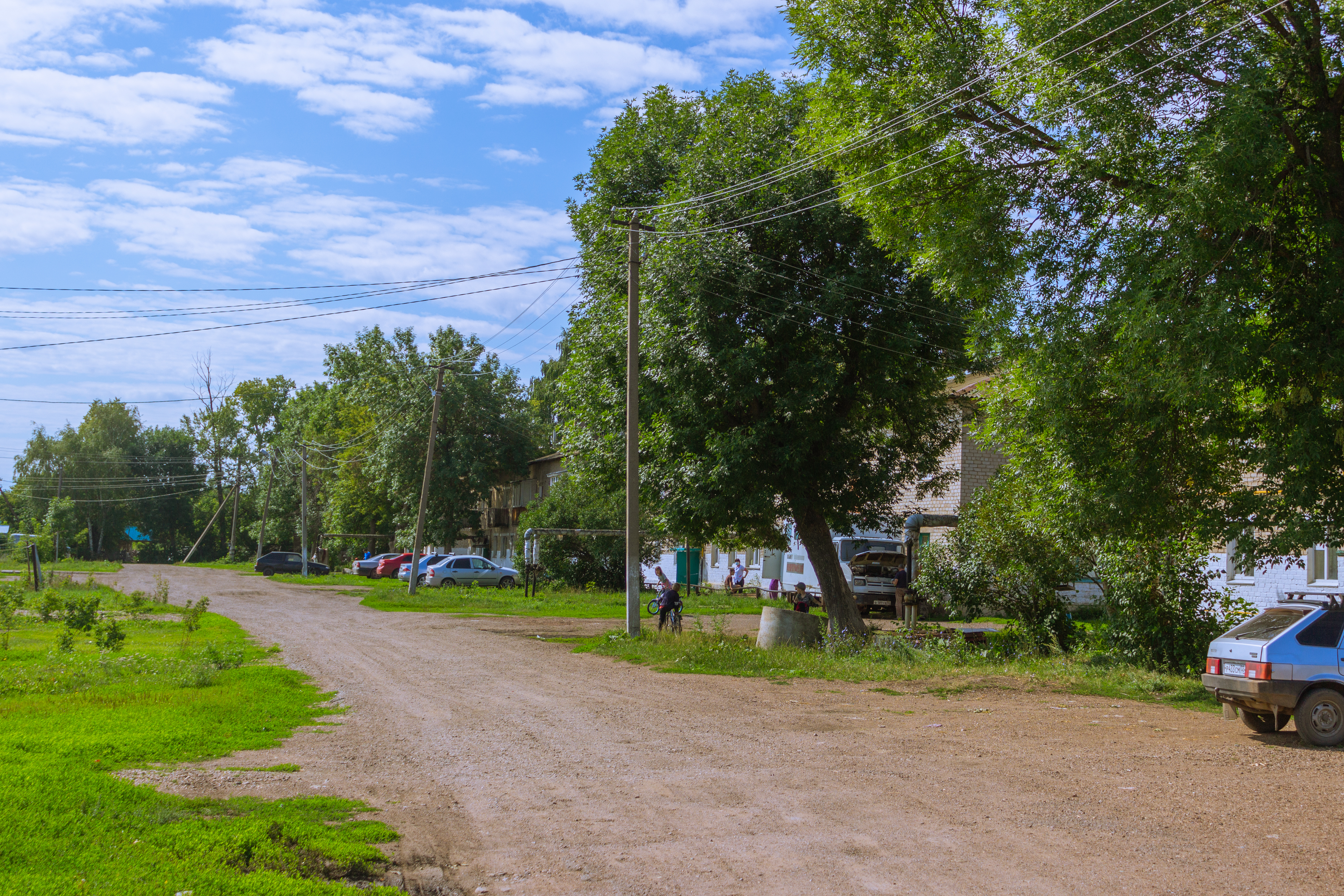
- A street within Tugay

- Location within Bashkortostan Location within Russia
- Coordinates: 54°56′N 55°57′E
- Country: Russia
- Region: Bashkortostan
- District: Blagoveshchensky District
- Time zone: UTC+5:00

Tugay (Russian: Тугай; Bashkir: Туғай, Tuğay) is a rural locality (a selo) and the administrative centre of Tugaysky Selsoviet, Blagoveshchensky District, Bashkortostan, Russia. The population was 555 as of 2010. There are 9 streets.

== Geography ==
Tugay is located 26 km south of Blagoveshchensk (the district's administrative centre) by road. Yakshivanovo is the nearest rural locality.
