= Novominzitarovo =

Novominzitarovo Новоминзитарово
- Village
- Location within Bashkortostan Location within Russia
- Coordinates: 54°59′N 56°17′E
- Country: Russia
- Region: Bashkortostan
- District: Blagoveshchensky District
- Time zone: UTC+5:00

Novominzitarovo (Russian: Новоминзитарово; Bashkir: Яңы Меңйетәр, Yañı Meñyetär) is a rural locality (a village) in Izyaksky Selsoviet, Blagoveshchensky District, Bashkortostan, Russia. The population was 61 as of 2010. There are 2 streets.

== Geography ==
Novominzitarovo is located 32 km southeast of Blagoveshchensk (the district's administrative centre) by road. Rafikovo is the nearest rural locality.
