= Yevgrafovka =

Yevgrafovka Евграфовка
- Village
- Location within Bashkortostan Location within Russia
- Coordinates: 55°17′N 56°13′E
- Country: Russia
- Region: Bashkortostan
- District: Blagoveshchensky District
- Time zone: UTC+5:00

Yevgrafovka (Russian: Евграфовка) is a rural locality (a village) in Pokrovsky Selsoviet, Blagoveshchensky District, Bashkortostan, Russia. The population was 5 as of 2010. There is 1 street.

== Geography ==
Yevgrafovka is located 39 km northeast of Blagoveshchensk (the district's administrative centre) by road. Sologubovka is the nearest rural locality.
