= Usa-Stepanovka =

Usa-Stepanovka Уса-Степановка
- Village
- Location within Bashkortostan Location within Russia
- Coordinates: 55°22′N 56°19′E
- Country: Russia
- Region: Bashkortostan
- District: Blagoveshchensky District
- Time zone: UTC+5:00

Usa-Stepanovka (Russian: Уса-Степановка; Bashkir: Уҫы-Степановка, Uśı-Stepanovka) is a rural locality (a village) in Oktyabrsky Selsoviet, Blagoveshchensky District, Bashkortostan, Russia. The population was 57 as of 2010. There is 1 street.

== Geography ==
Usa-Stepanovka is located 71 km northeast of Blagoveshchensk (the district's administrative centre) by road. Kurgashtamak is the nearest rural locality.
