= Ukman =

Ukman Укман
- Village
- Location within Bashkortostan Location within Russia
- Coordinates: 55°03′N 56°25′E
- Country: Russia
- Region: Bashkortostan
- District: Blagoveshchensky District
- Time zone: UTC+5:00

Ukman (Russian: Укман; Bashkir: Уҡман, Uqman) is a rural locality (a village) in Staronadezhdinsky Selsoviet, Blagoveshchensky District, Bashkortostan, Russia. The population was 28 as of 2010. There are 3 streets.

== Geography ==
Ukman is located 37 km east of Blagoveshchensk (the district's administrative centre) by road. Sokolovskoye is the nearest rural locality.
