= Sedyash =

Sedyash Седяш
- Village
- Location within Bashkortostan Location within Russia
- Coordinates: 55°26′N 56°25′E
- Country: Russia
- Region: Bashkortostan
- District: Blagoveshchensky District
- Time zone: UTC+5:00

Sedyash (Russian: Седяш; Bashkir: Сиҙәш, Siźäş) is a rural locality (a village) in Oktyabrsky Selsoviet, Blagoveshchensky District, Bashkortostan, Russia. The population was 18 as of 2010.

== Geography ==
Sedyash is located 67 km northeast of Blagoveshchensk (the district's administrative centre) by road. Osipovka is the nearest rural locality.
