= Aramelevka =

Aramelevka Арамелевка
- Village
- Location within Bashkortostan Location within Russia
- Coordinates: 55°03′N 56°11′E
- Country: Russia
- Region: Bashkortostan
- District: Blagoveshchensky District
- Time zone: UTC+5:00

Aramelevka (Russian: Арамелевка) is a rural locality (a village) in Ilyino-Polyansky Selsoviet, Blagoveshchensky District, Bashkortostan, Russia. The population was 193 as of 2010. There is 1 street.

== Geography ==
Aramelevka is located 20 km east of Blagoveshchensk (the district's administrative centre) by road. Ilyino-Polyana is the nearest rural locality.
