= Suneyevka =

Suneyevka Сунеевка
- Village
- Location within Bashkortostan Location within Russia
- Coordinates: 55°04′N 56°00′E
- Country: Russia
- Region: Bashkortostan
- District: Blagoveshchensky District
- Time zone: UTC+5:00

Suneyevka (Russian: Сунеевка; Bashkir: Сөнәй, Sönäy) is a rural locality (a village) in Nikolayevsky Selsoviet, Blagoveshchensky District, Bashkortostan, Russia. The population was 12 as of 2010. There is 1 street.

== Geography ==
Suneyevka is located 7 km northeast of Blagoveshchensk (the district's administrative centre) by road. Blagoveshchensk is the nearest rural locality.
