= Khristolyubovo =

Khristolyubovo Христолюбово
- Village
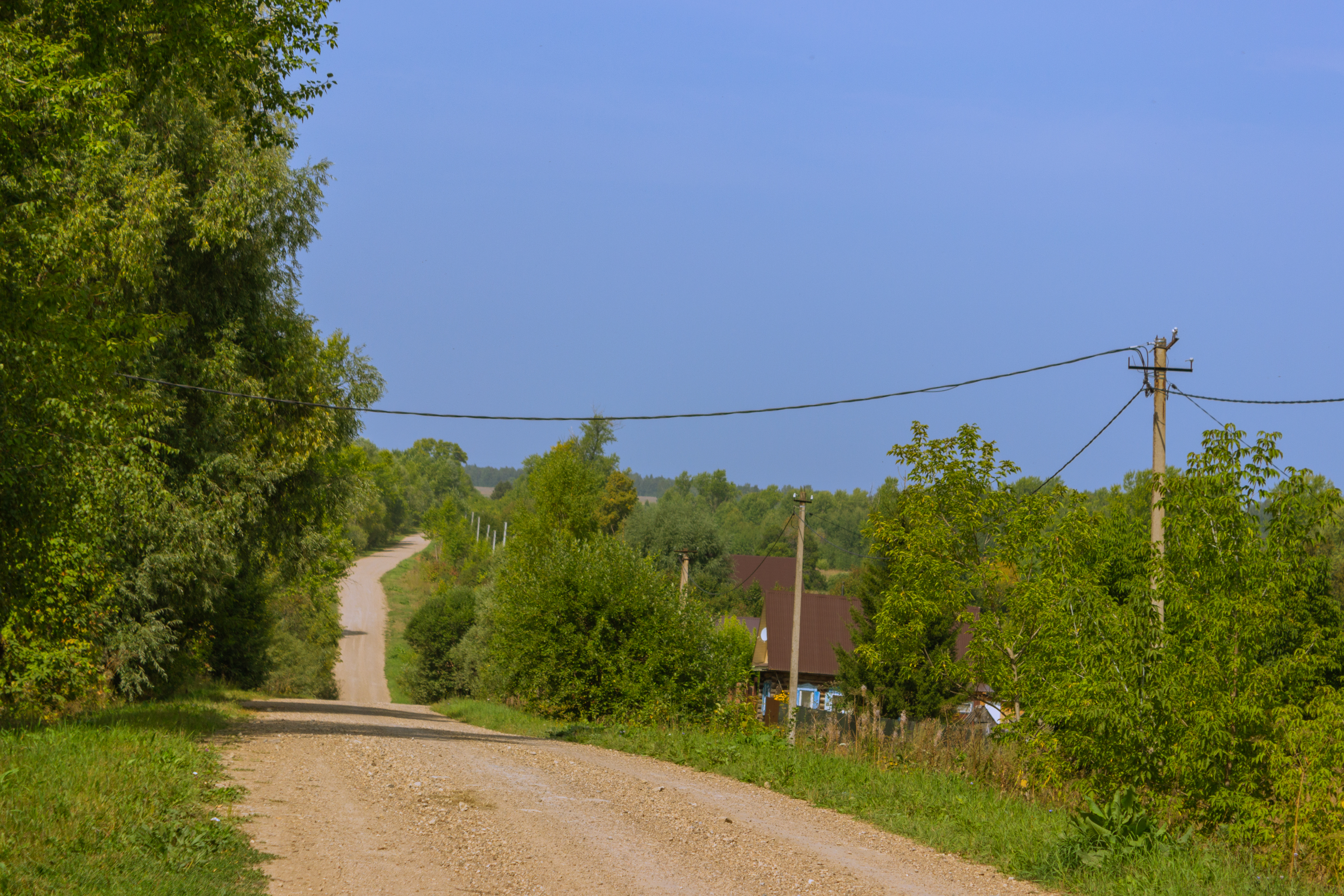

- Location within Bashkortostan Location within Russia
- Coordinates: 55°08′N 56°21′E
- Country: Russia
- Region: Bashkortostan
- District: Blagoveshchensky District
- Time zone: UTC+5:00

Khristolyubovo (Russian: Христолюбово) is a rural locality (a village) in Volkovsky Selsoviet, Blagoveshchensky District, Bashkortostan, Russia. The population was 6 as of 2010. There is 1 street.

== Geography ==
Khristolyubovo is located 36 km northeast of Blagoveshchensk (the district's administrative centre) by road. Volkovo is the nearest rural locality.
