= Nizhny Izyak =

Nizhny Izyak Нижний Изяк
- Village
- Location within Bashkortostan Location within Russia
- Coordinates: 54°58′N 56°17′E
- Country: Russia
- Region: Bashkortostan
- District: Blagoveshchensky District
- Time zone: UTC+5:00

Nizhny Izyak (Russian: Нижний Изяк; Bashkir: Түбәнге Иҙәк, Tübänge İźäk; Meadow Mari: Ӱлыл Ӱзек, Ülyl Üzek) is a rural locality (a village) in Izyaksky Selsoviet, Blagoveshchensky District, Bashkortostan, Russia. The population was 256 as of 2010. There are 6 streets.

== Geography ==
Nizhny Izyak is located 30 km southeast of Blagoveshchensk (the district's administrative centre) by road. Rafikovo is the nearest rural locality.
