= Krasnaya Burna =

Krasnaya Burna Красная Бурна
- Village
- Location within Bashkortostan Location within Russia
- Coordinates: 55°17′N 56°35′E
- Country: Russia
- Region: Bashkortostan
- District: Blagoveshchensky District
- Time zone: UTC+5:00

Krasnaya Burna (Russian: Красная Бурна; Bashkir: Ҡыҙыл Бурна, Qıźıl Burna) is a rural locality (a village) in Bedeyevo-Polyansky Selsoviet, Blagoveshchensky District, Bashkortostan, Russia. The population was 8 as of 2010. There is 1 street.

== Geography ==
Krasnaya Burna is located on the right bank of the Ufa River, 90 km northeast of Blagoveshchensk (the district's administrative centre) by road. Bulychevo is the nearest rural locality.
