= Starogilevo =

Starogilevo Старогилево
- Village
- Location within Bashkortostan Location within Russia
- Coordinates: 55°05′N 56°12′E
- Country: Russia
- Region: Bashkortostan
- District: Blagoveshchensky District
- Time zone: UTC+5:00

Starogilevo (Russian: Старогилево) is a rural locality (a village) in Ilyino-Polyansky Selsoviet, Blagoveshchensky District, Bashkortostan, Russia. The population was 9 as of 2010. There is 1 street.

== Geography ==
Starogilevo is located 28 km northeast of Blagoveshchensk (the district's administrative centre) by road. Nikolskoye is the nearest rural locality.
