= Mukhametdinovo =

Mukhametdinovo Мухаметдиново
- Village
- Location within Bashkortostan Location within Russia
- Coordinates: 55°32′N 56°23′E
- Country: Russia
- Region: Bashkortostan
- District: Blagoveshchensky District
- Time zone: UTC+5:00

Mukhametdinovo (Russian: Мухаметдиново; Bashkir: Мөхәмәтдин, Möxämätdin) is a rural locality (a village) in Oktyabrsky Selsoviet, Blagoveshchensky District, Bashkortostan, Russia. The population was 19 as of 2010. There are 2 streets.

== Geography ==
Mukhametdinovo is located 81 km northeast of Blagoveshchensk (the district's administrative centre) by road. Bolshoy Log is the nearest rural locality.
