= Gorny Urazbay =

Gorny Urazbay Горный Уразбай
- Village
- Location within Bashkortostan Location within Russia
- Coordinates: 54°58′N 56°13′E
- Country: Russia
- Region: Bashkortostan
- District: Blagoveshchensky District
- Time zone: UTC+5:00

Gorny Urazbay (Russian: Горный Уразбай; Bashkir: Тау-Ураҙбай, Taw-Uraźbay) is a rural locality (a village) in Izyaksky Selsoviet, Blagoveshchensky District, Bashkortostan, Russia. The population was 23 as of 2010. There is 1 street.

== Geography ==
Gorny Urazbay is located 28 km southeast of Blagoveshchensk (the district's administrative centre) by road. Verkhny Izyak is the nearest rural locality.
