= Serguyaz =

Serguyaz Сергуяз
- Village
- Location within Bashkortostan Location within Russia
- Coordinates: 55°14′N 56°08′E
- Country: Russia
- Region: Bashkortostan
- District: Blagoveshchensky District
- Time zone: UTC+5:00

Serguyaz (Russian: Сергуяз) is a rural locality (a village) in Novonadezhdinsky Selsoviet, Blagoveshchensky District, Bashkortostan, Russia. The population was 1 as of 2010. There is 1 street.

== Geography ==
Serguyaz is located 31 km northeast of Blagoveshchensk (the district's administrative centre) by road. Yazykovo is the nearest rural locality.
