= Sanninskoye =

Sanninskoye Саннинское
- Selo
- Location within Bashkortostan Location within Russia
- Coordinates: 55°17′N 56°08′E
- Country: Russia
- Region: Bashkortostan
- District: Blagoveshchensky District
- Time zone: UTC+5:00

Sanninskoye (Russian: Саннинское; Bashkir: Һынны, Hınnı) is a rural locality (a selo) and the administrative centre of Sanninsky Selsoviet, Blagoveshchensky District, Bashkortostan, Russia. The population was 383 as of 2010. There are 2 streets.

== Geography ==
Sanninskoye is located 35 km northeast of Blagoveshchensk (the district's administrative centre) by road. Alexandrovka is the nearest rural locality.
