= Shchepnoye =

Shchepnoye Щепное
- Village
- Location within Bashkortostan Location within Russia
- Coordinates: 54°59′N 56°05′E
- Country: Russia
- Region: Bashkortostan
- District: Blagoveshchensky District
- Time zone: UTC+5:00

Shchepnoye (Russian: Щепное) is a rural locality (a village) in Tugaysky Selsoviet, Blagoveshchensky District, Bashkortostan, Russia. The population was 9 as of 2010. There is 1 street.

== Geography ==
Shchepnoye is located 17 km southeast of Blagoveshchensk (the district's administrative centre) by road. Starye Turbasly is the nearest rural locality.
