= Bulychyovo =

Bulychyovo Булычёво
- Village
- Location within Bashkortostan Location within Russia
- Coordinates: 55°17′N 56°38′E
- Country: Russia
- Region: Bashkortostan
- District: Blagoveshchensky District
- Time zone: UTC+5:00

Bulychyovo (Russian: Булычёво) is a rural locality (a village) in Bedeyevo-Polyansky Selsoviet, Blagoveshchensky District, Bashkortostan, Russia. The population was 33 as of 2010. There is 1 street.

== Geography ==
Bulychyovo is located 87 km northeast of Blagoveshchensk (the district's administrative centre) by road. Irkenlek is the nearest rural locality.
