= Karagaykul =

Karagaykul Карагайкуль
- Village
- Location within Bashkortostan Location within Russia
- Coordinates: 55°30′N 56°27′E
- Country: Russia
- Region: Bashkortostan
- District: Blagoveshchensky District
- Time zone: UTC+5:00

Karagaykul (Russian: Карагайкуль; Bashkir: Ҡарағайкүл, Qarağaykül) is a rural locality (a village) in Oktyabrsky Selsoviet, Blagoveshchensky District, Bashkortostan, Russia. The population was 111 as of 2010. There are 2 streets.

== Geography ==
Karagaykul is located 74 km northeast of Blagoveshchensk (the district's administrative centre) by road. Mukhametdinovo is the nearest rural locality.
