= Arkaul =

Arkaul Аркаул
- Village
- Location within Bashkortostan Location within Russia
- Coordinates: 55°07′N 56°25′E
- Country: Russia
- Region: Bashkortostan
- District: Blagoveshchensky District
- Time zone: UTC+5:00

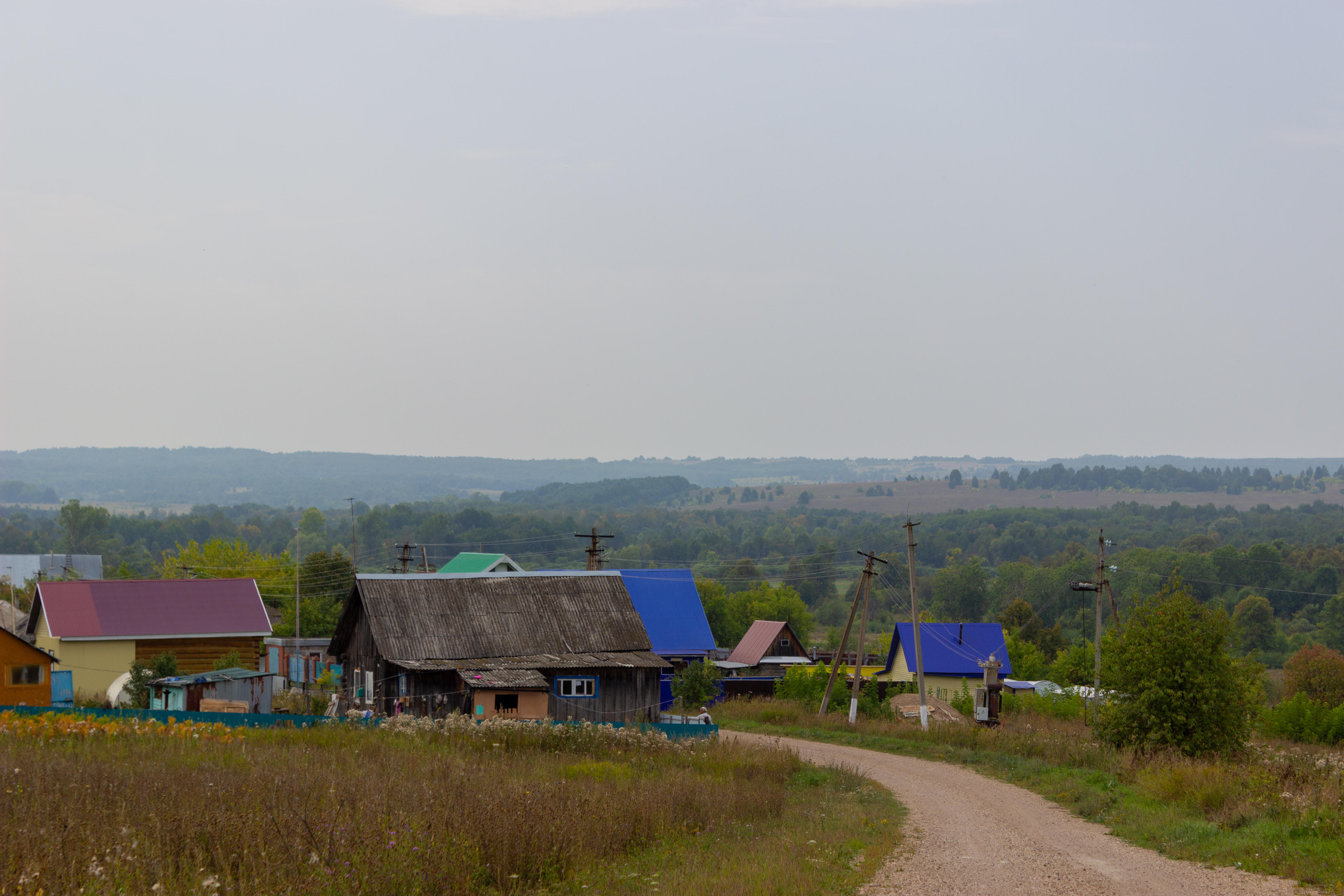
Arkaul village, Republic of Bashkortostan

Arkaul (Russian: Аркаул; Bashkir: Арҡауыл, Arqawıl) is a rural locality (a village) in Staronadezhdinsky Selsoviet, Blagoveshchensky District, Bashkortostan, Russia. The population was 93 as of 2010. There are 2 streets.

== Geography ==
Arkaul is located 44 km northeast of Blagoveshchensk (the district's administrative centre) by road. Bykovo is the nearest rural locality.
