= Tanayka =

Tanayka Танайка
- Village
- Location within Bashkortostan Location within Russia
- Coordinates: 55°23′N 56°27′E
- Country: Russia
- Region: Bashkortostan
- District: Blagoveshchensky District
- Time zone: UTC+5:00

Tanayka (Russian: Танайка; Bashkir: Тәнәй, Tänäy) is a rural locality (a village) in Bedeyevo-Polyansky Selsoviet, Blagoveshchensky District, Bashkortostan, Russia. The population was 60 as of 2010. There are 2 streets.

== Geography ==
Tanayka is located 59 km (37 mi) northeast of Blagoveshchensk (the district's administrative centre) by road. Pavlovka is the nearest rural locality.
