= Sedovka =

Sedovka Седовка
- Village
- Location within Bashkortostan Location within Russia
- Coordinates: 55°07′N 56°05′E
- Country: Russia
- Region: Bashkortostan
- District: Blagoveshchensky District
- Time zone: UTC+5:00

Sedovka (Russian: Седовка) is a rural locality (a village) in Novonadezhdinsky Selsoviet, Blagoveshchensky District, Bashkortostan, Russia. The population was 2 as of 2010. There is 1 street.

== Geography ==
Sedovka is located 17 km northeast of Blagoveshchensk (the district's administrative centre) by road. Kamennaya Polyana is the nearest rural locality.
