= Shalana =

Shalana Шалана
- Village
- Location within Bashkortostan Location within Russia
- Coordinates: 55°01′N 56°19′E
- Country: Russia
- Region: Bashkortostan
- District: Blagoveshchensky District
- Time zone: UTC+5:00

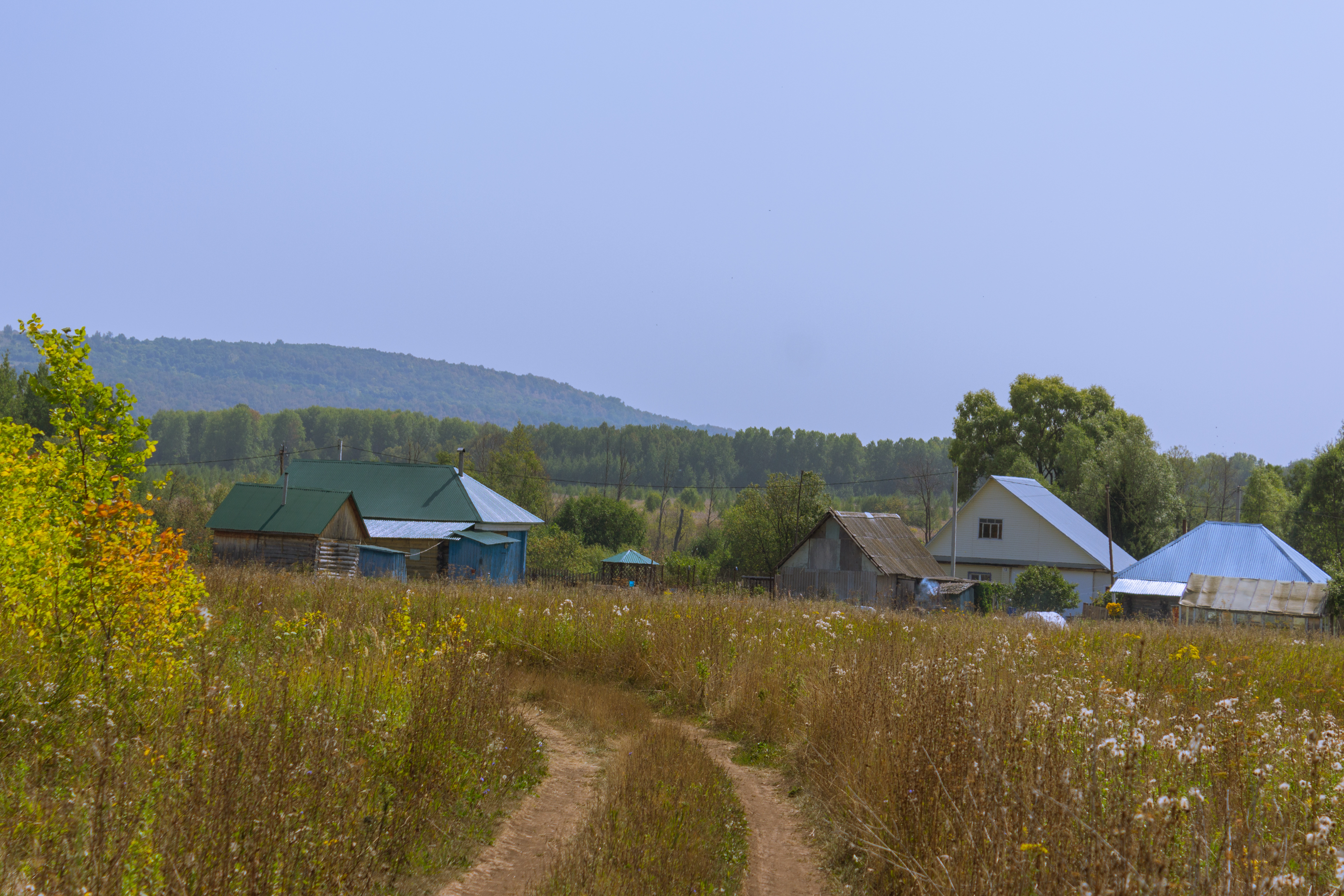
village of Shalana, Republic of Bashkortostan

Shalana (Russian: Шалана; Bashkir: Шылан, Şılan) is a rural locality (a village) in Ilyino-Polyansky Selsoviet, Blagoveshchensky District, Bashkortostan, Russia. The population was 6 as of 2010. There is 1 street.

== Geography ==
Shalana is located 30 km east of Blagoveshchensk (the district's administrative centre) by road. Sitniki is the nearest rural locality.
