= Novoilikovo, Blagoveshchensky District, Republic of Bashkortostan =

Novoilikovo Новоиликово
- Village
- Location within Bashkortostan Location within Russia
- Coordinates: 55°19′N 56°11′E
- Country: Russia
- Region: Bashkortostan
- District: Blagoveshchensky District
- Time zone: UTC+5:00

Novoilikovo (Russian: Новоиликово; Bashkir: Яңы Илек, Yañı İlek) is a rural locality (a village) in Ilikovsky Selsoviet, Blagoveshchensky District, Bashkortostan, Russia. The population was 16 as of 2010. There is 1 street.

== Geography ==
Novoilikovo is located 42 km north of Blagoveshchensk (the district's administrative centre) by road. Staroilikovo is the nearest rural locality.
