= Sitniki =

Sitniki Ситники
- Village
- Location within Bashkortostan Location within Russia
- Coordinates: 55°02′N 56°19′E
- Country: Russia
- Region: Bashkortostan
- District: Blagoveshchensky District
- Time zone: UTC+5:00

Sitniki (Russian: Ситники) is a rural locality (a village) in Ilyino-Polyansky Selsoviet, Blagoveshchensky District, Bashkortostan, Russia. The population was 32 as of 2010. There is 1 street.

== Geography ==
Sitniki is located 30 km east of Blagoveshchensk (the district's administrative centre) by road. Sokolovskoye is the nearest rural locality.
