= Kurech =

Kurech Куреч
- Village
- Location within Bashkortostan Location within Russia
- Coordinates: 55°03′N 55°44′E
- Country: Russia
- Region: Bashkortostan
- District: Blagoveshchensky District
- Time zone: UTC+5:00

Kurech (Russian: Куреч; Bashkir: Көрәш, Köräş) is a rural locality (a village) in Nikolayevsky Selsoviet, Blagoveshchensky District, Bashkortostan, Russia. The population was 49 as of 2010. There are 3 streets.

== Geography ==
Kurech is located 20 km west of Blagoveshchensk (the district's administrative centre) by road. Andreyevka is the nearest rural locality.
