= Yablochny =

Yablochny Яблочный
- Village
- Location within Bashkortostan Location within Russia
- Coordinates: 55°07′N 56°47′E
- Country: Russia
- Region: Bashkortostan
- District: Blagoveshchensky District
- Time zone: UTC+5:00

Yablochny (Russian: Яблочный) is a rural locality (a village) in Udelno-Duvaneysky Selsoviet, Blagoveshchensky District, Bashkortostan, Russia. The population was 12 as of 2010. There are 2 streets.

== Geography ==
Yablochny is situated on the Belaya River, 25 km northwest of Blagoveshchensk, the district's administrative centre, by road. The nearest rural locality is Ilyinsky.
