= Sologubovka =

Sologubovka Сологубовка
- Village
- Location within Bashkortostan Location within Russia
- Coordinates: 55°14′N 56°12′E
- Country: Russia
- Region: Bashkortostan
- District: Blagoveshchensky District
- Time zone: UTC+5:00

Sologubovka (Russian: Сологубовка) is a rural locality (a village) in Pokrovsky Selsoviet, Blagoveshchensky District, Bashkortostan, Russia. The population was 62 as of 2010. There is 1 street.

== Geography ==
Sologubovka is located 33 km northeast of Blagoveshchensk (the district's administrative centre) by road. Pokrovka is the nearest rural locality.
