= Novoblagoveshchenka =

Novoblagoveshchenka Новоблаговещенка
- Village
- Location within Bashkortostan Location within Russia
- Coordinates: 55°06′N 56°09′E
- Country: Russia
- Region: Bashkortostan
- District: Blagoveshchensky District
- Time zone: UTC+5:00

Novoblagoveshchenka (Russian: Новоблаговещенка) is a rural locality (a village) in Novonadezhdinsky Selsoviet, Blagoveshchensky District, Bashkortostan, Russia. The population was 5 as of 2010. There are 2 streets.

== Geography ==
Novoblagoveshchenka is located 24 km northeast of Blagoveshchensk (the district's administrative centre) by road. Olkhovka is the nearest rural locality.
