= Beryozovaya Polyana =

Beryozovaya Polyana Берёзовая Поляна
- Village
- Location within Bashkortostan Location within Russia
- Coordinates: 55°09′N 56°32′E
- Country: Russia
- Region: Bashkortostan
- District: Blagoveshchensky District
- Time zone: UTC+5:00

Beryozovaya Polyana (Russian: Берёзовая Поляна) is a rural locality (a village) in Staronadezhdinsky Selsoviet, Blagoveshchensky District, Bashkortostan, Russia. The population was 27 as of 2010. There is 1 street.

== Geography ==
Beryozovaya Polyana is located 55 km northeast of Blagoveshchensk (the district's administrative centre) by road. Ust-Saldybash is the nearest rural locality.
