= Ashkashla =

Ashkashla Ашкашла
- Village
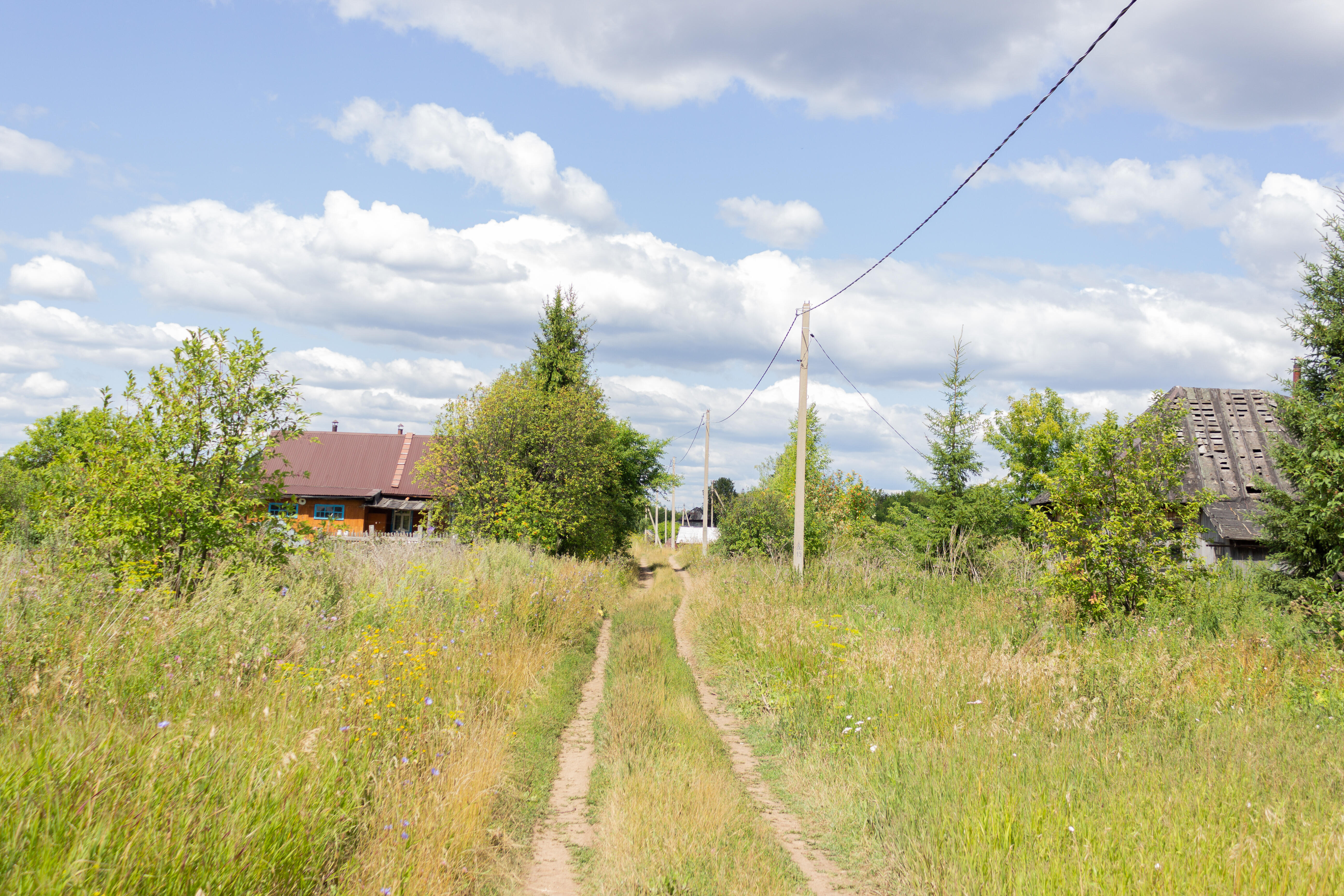
- Ashkashla village

- Location within Bashkortostan Location within Russia
- Coordinates: 55°00′N 56°09′E
- Country: Russia
- Region: Bashkortostan
- District: Blagoveshchensky District
- Time zone: UTC+5:00

Ashkashla (Russian: Ашкашла; Bashkir: Ашҡашлы, Aşqaşlı) is a rural locality (a village) in Ilyino-Polyansky Selsoviet, Blagoveshchensky District, Bashkortostan, Russia. The population was 28 as of 2010. There is 1 street.

== Geography ==
Ashkashla is located 24 km southeast of Blagoveshchensk (the district's administrative centre) by road. Rozhdestvenskoye and Kryukovsky are the nearest rural localities.
