= Novonikolsky =

Novonikolsky Новоникольский
- Village
- Location within Bashkortostan Location within Russia
- Coordinates: 55°00′N 55°54′E
- Country: Russia
- Region: Bashkortostan
- District: Blagoveshchensky District
- Time zone: UTC+5:00

Novonikolsky (Russian: Новоникольский) is a rural locality (a village) in Tugaysky Selsoviet, Blagoveshchensky District, Bashkortostan, Russia. The population was 21 as of 2010. There are 2 streets.

== Geography ==
Novonikolsky is located 34 km southwest of Blagoveshchensk (the district's administrative centre) by road. Rudny is the nearest rural locality.
