= Kuliki, Republic of Bashkortostan =

Kuliki Кулики
- Village
- Location within Bashkortostan Location within Russia
- Coordinates: 55°09′N 56°18′E
- Country: Russia
- Region: Bashkortostan
- District: Blagoveshchensky District
- Time zone: UTC+5:00

Kuliki (Russian: Кулики) is a rural locality (a village) in Volkovsky Selsoviet, Blagoveshchensky District, Bashkortostan, Russia. The population was 34 as of the 2010 census. There is 1 street.

== Geography ==
Kuliki is located 42 km northeast of Blagoveshchensk (the district's administrative centre) by road. Volkovo is the nearest rural locality.
