= Kamennaya Polyana =

Kamennaya Polyana Каменная Поляна
- Village
- Location within Bashkortostan Location within Russia
- Coordinates: 55°07′N 56°04′E
- Country: Russia
- Region: Bashkortostan
- District: Blagoveshchensky District
- Time zone: UTC+5:00

Kamennaya Polyana (Russian: Каменная Поляна) is a rural locality (a village) in Novonadezhdinsky Selsoviet, Blagoveshchensky District, Bashkortostan, Russia. The population was 25 as of 2010. There is 1 street.

== Geography ==
Kamennaya Polyana is located 15 km northeast of Blagoveshchensk (the district's administrative centre) by road. Sedovka is the nearest rural locality.
