= Oshmyanka =

Oshmyanka Ошмянка
- Village
- Location within Bashkortostan Location within Russia
- Coordinates: 55°08′N 56°00′E
- Country: Russia
- Region: Bashkortostan
- District: Blagoveshchensky District
- Time zone: UTC+5:00

Oshmyanka (Russian: Ошмянка) is a rural locality (a village) in Orlovsky Selsoviet, Blagoveshchensky District, Bashkortostan, Russia. The population was 252 as of 2010. There are 3 streets.

== Geography ==
Oshmyanka is located 20 km north of Blagoveshchensk (the district's administrative centre) by road. Truzhenik is the nearest rural locality.
