= Ustyugovsky =

Village in Bashkortostan, Russia

Ustyugovsky Устюговский
- Village
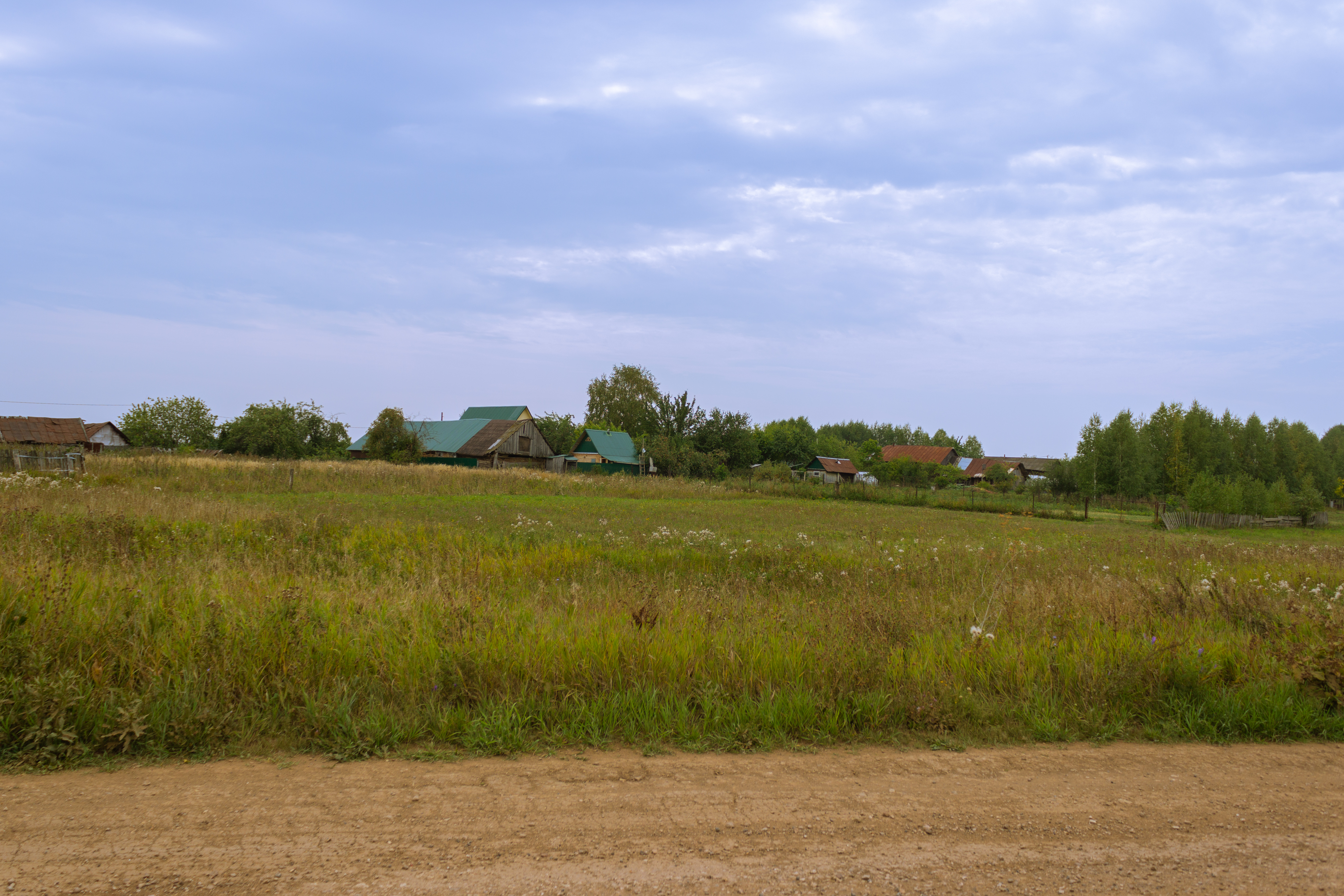
- Ustyugovsky, Blagoveshchensky District, Bashkortostan, Russia

- Location within Bashkortostan Location within Russia
- Coordinates: 55°12′N 56°32′E
- Country: Russia
- Region: Bashkortostan
- District: Blagoveshchensky District
- Time zone: UTC+5:00

Ustyugovsky (Russian: Устюговский) is a rural locality (a village) in Staronadezhdinsky Selsoviet, Blagoveshchensky District, Bashkortostan, Russia. The population was 9 as of 2010. There is only 1 street.

== Geography ==
Ustyugovsky is located 60 km north-east of Blagoveshchensk (the district's administrative centre) by road. Starobedeyevo is the nearest rural locality.
