= Fyodorovka, Blagoveshchensky District, Republic of Bashkortostan =

Fyodorovka Фёдоровка
- Village
- Location within Bashkortostan Location within Russia
- Coordinates: 55°17′N 56°18′E
- Country: Russia
- Region: Bashkortostan
- District: Blagoveshchensky District
- Time zone: UTC+5:00

Fyodorovka (Russian: Фёдоровка) is a rural locality (a village) in Bedeyevo-Polyansky Selsoviet, Blagoveshchensky District, Bashkortostan, Russia. The population was 260 as of 2010. There are 2 streets.

== Geography ==
Fyodorovka is located 43 km northeast of Blagoveshchensk (the district's administrative centre) by road. Yevgrafovka is the nearest rural locality.
