= Novyye Turbasly =

Novyye Turbasly Новые Турбаслы
- Village
- Location within Bashkortostan Location within Russia
- Coordinates: 54°57′N 56°00′E
- Country: Russia
- Region: Bashkortostan
- District: Blagoveshchensky District
- Time zone: UTC+5:00

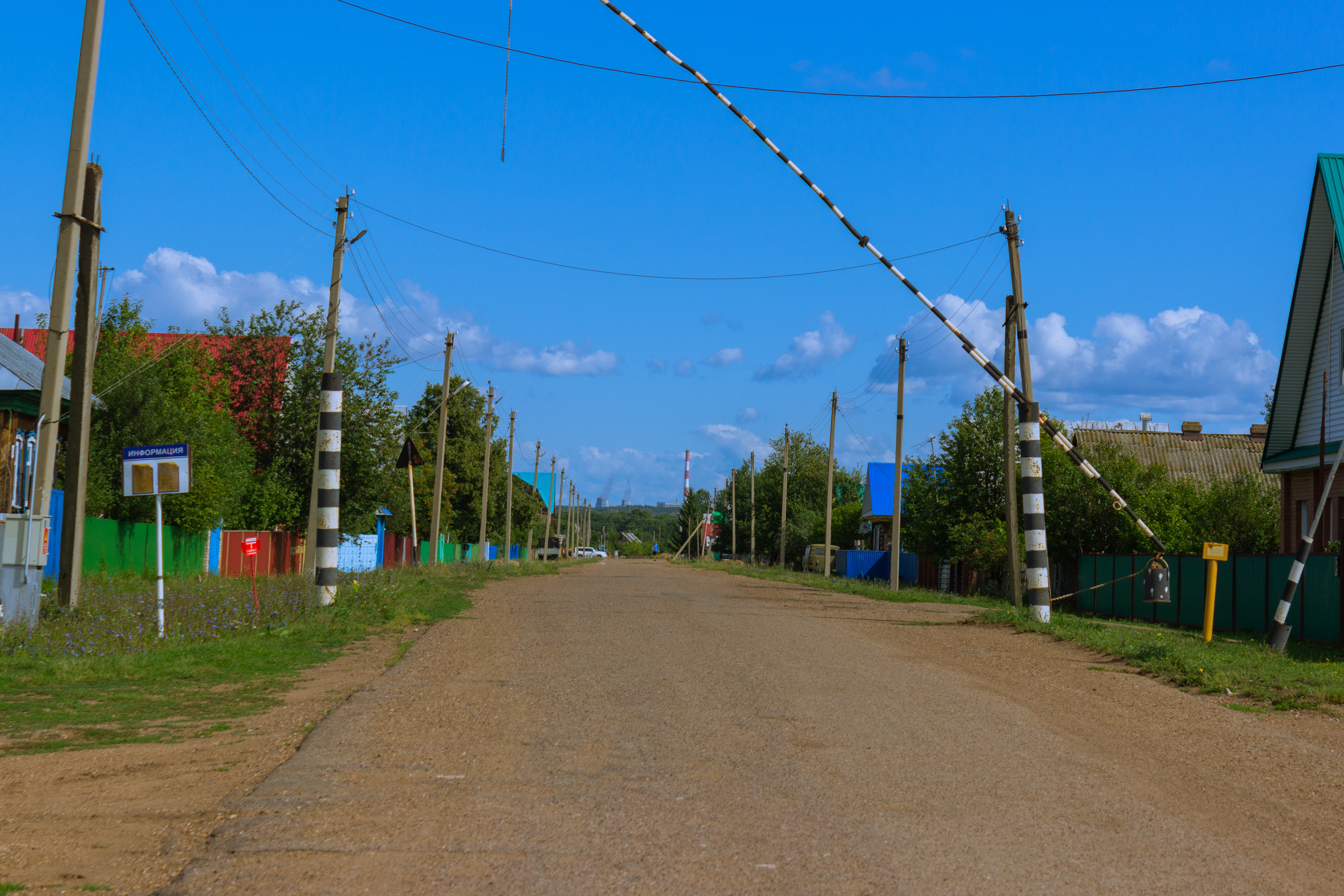
village of Novye Turbasly, Republic of Bashkortostan

Novyye Turbasly (Russian: Новые Турбаслы; Bashkir: Яңы Турбаҫлы, Yañı Turbaślı) is a rural locality (a village) in Tugaysky Selsoviet, Blagoveshchensky District, Bashkortostan, Russia. The population was 51 as of 2010. There are 2 streets.

== Geography ==
Novyye Turbasly is located 30 km south of Blagoveshchensk (the district's administrative centre) by road. Tugay is the nearest rural locality.
