= Staronadezhdino =

Staronadezhdino Старонадеждино
- Selo
- Location within Bashkortostan Location within Russia
- Coordinates: 55°12′N 56°27′E
- Country: Russia
- Region: Bashkortostan
- District: Blagoveshchensky District

Population (2010)
  - Total: 525
- Time zone: UTC+5:00
- Postal code: 453438

Staronadezhdino (Russian: Старонадеждино) is a rural locality (a selo) and the administrative centre of Staronadezhdinsky Selsoviet, Blagoveshchensky District, Bashkortostan, Russia. The population was 525 as of 2010. There are 4 streets.

== Geography ==
It is located 54 km northeast of Blagoveshchensk.
