= Tornovka =

Tornovka Торновка
- Village
- Location within Bashkortostan Location within Russia
- Coordinates: 54°59′N 56°15′E
- Country: Russia
- Region: Bashkortostan
- District: Blagoveshchensky District
- Time zone: UTC+5:00

Tornovka (Russian: Торновка) is a rural locality (a village) in Izyaksky Selsoviet, Blagoveshchensky District, Bashkortostan, Russia. The population was 22 as of 2010. There are 2 streets.

== Geography ==
Tornovka is located 28 km southeast of Blagoveshchensk (the district's administrative centre) by road. Verkhny Izyak is the nearest rural locality.
