= Ilyinsky, Republic of Bashkortostan =

Ilyinsky Ильинский
- Village
- Location within Bashkortostan Location within Russia
- Coordinates: 55°08′N 55°48′E
- Country: Russia
- Region: Bashkortostan
- District: Blagoveshchensky District

Population (2010)
  - Total: 5
- Time zone: UTC+5:00

Ilyinsky (Russian: Ильинский) is a rural locality (a village) in Udelno-Duvaneysky Selsoviet, Blagoveshchensky District, Bashkortostan, Russia. The population was 5 as of 2010. There are 4 streets.

== Geography ==
Ilyinsky is located on the Belaya River, 24 km northwest of Blagoveshchensk (the district's administrative centre) by road. Yablochny is the nearest rural locality.
