= Siberian Colonial Battalion (France) =

French colonial force active during the Russian Civil War

- Bataillon Colonial Sibérien
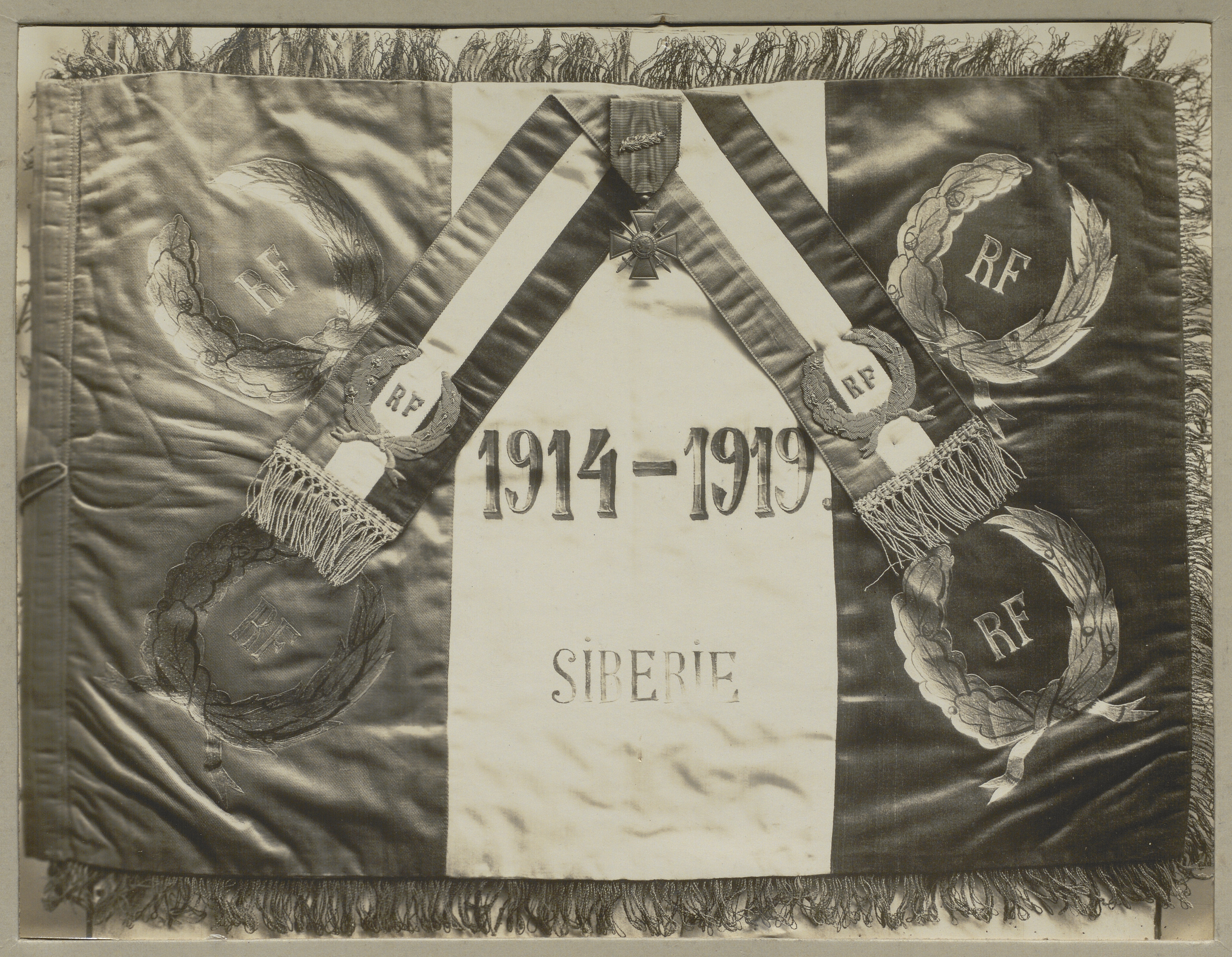
- Pennant of the Siberian Colonial Battalion exhibited in Tianjin in the interwar period
- Active: July 14, 1918 - March 4, 1920
- Disbanded: March 4, 1920
- Country: France
- Allegiance: French Army
- Type: March Battalion
- Size: 1,140
- Engagements: Russian Civil War; Allied Intervention in Siberia
- Decorations: Croix de guerre 1914-1918

Commanders
- Colonel: R. Mallet

The Siberian Colonial Battalion (French: Bataillon Colonial Sibérien or BCS) was a French colonial military force sent to Vladivostok, Russia, during the Russian Revolution as part of the Allied intervention in the Russian Civil War and the North Russia intervention to help bolster allied presence, support the Russian White movement, and to oppose the Bolshevik Revolution.

== History ==
From 1918-1920 France deployed several expeditionary forces including the French Expeditionary Force in Northern Russia (Corps Expéditionnaire Français en Russie du Nord) at Arkhangelsk and the French southern Army of the Danube as part of the Armée d'Orient. The Siberian Colonial Battalion was one of the formations specifically formed by France in order to help the Russian White movement during the North Russia intervention from 1918-1919. The unit primarily consisted of both French and French colonial troops including; French, Vietnamese, Guyanese, Serbs, and Cambodians among others.

The Siberian Colonial Battalion was first formed on July 14, 1918 and consisted of the following units:

- The 1st and 8th companies of the 9th Marine Infantry Regiment from French Indochina.
- A company of the 3rd Zouave Regiment from Tonkin.
- A Serbian detachment (19 men) from Shanghai.
- The 1st and 11th companies of the 16th Colonial Infantry Regiment.

In addition to the Serbian elements, the battalion numbered roughly 1,140 soldiers and included 277 Tirailleurs indochinois, and Zouaves based in Tonkin. The unit was commanded by Colonel R. Mallet and fell under overall command of Maurice Janin. Initially, the aim of the Siberian Colonial Battalion was to help evacuate elements of the Czechoslovak Legion and prevent the Germans from getting their hands on the war material delivered to Russia before the October Revolution, which was stored mainly in the Arctic ports at Murmansk and Arkhangelsk and the Pacific ports in Vladivostok.

=== Deployment to Russia ===
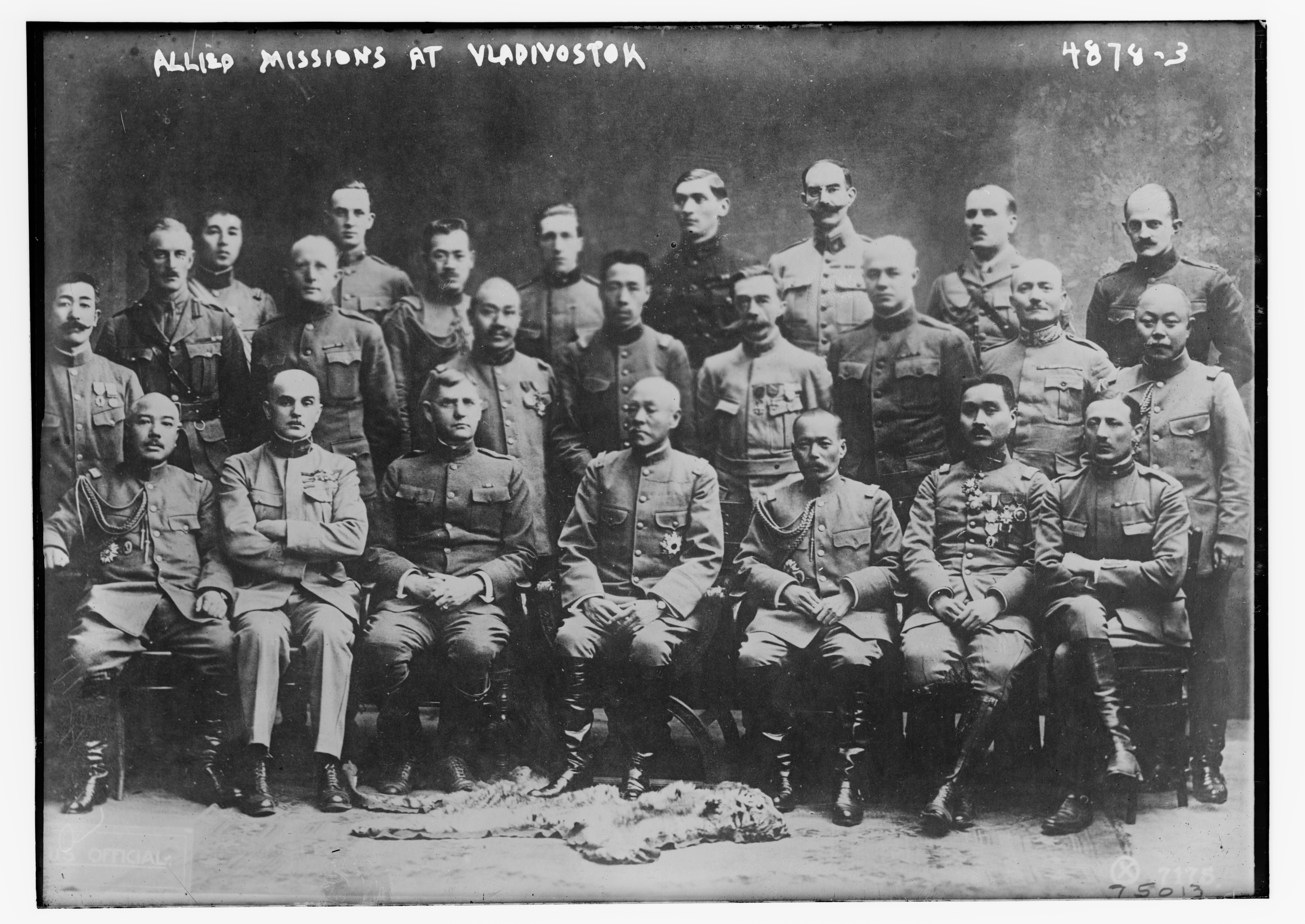
Commanding Officers and Chiefs of Staff of the Allied Military Mission to Siberia in Vladivostok, 1918-1919.

The battalion embarked for Shanghai on July 24, 1918 aboard the liner the SS André Lebon where it was joined by the Serbian detachment. Priority for transport was given to the battalion headquarters, a European company, a company of Annamite riflemen (Tonkinese Rifles), and a machine gun section. It was planned that if the Indochinese were unable to embark, it would be the men of the French Tientsin China Occupation Corps who would move to Vladivostok.

The unit disembarked in Vladivostok on August 9, 1918, from there the BCS was split into two separate maneuver battalions. The first was commanded by Captain Feuerstein (5th and 8th companies, a platoon of the 11th and two machine gun sections). The second was commanded by Captain Schill (6th and 7th companies, a platoon of the 11th company and two machine gun sections). The whole was commanded by Major, alter Colonel, R. Mallet. From Vladivostok, the BCS was deployed along the Trans-Siberian Railway to the West. The BCS supported the Czechoslovak Legion and then the Japanese Expeditionary Force. From August 14 to 24, 1918 the BCS had already lost 2 killed, 19 wounded, and 1 missing.

On November 11, 1918, the BCS arrived in Novo-Nikolaevsk (present-day Novosibirsk) where a banquet was offered by the Russian authorities and by the staff of the Polish troops. On December 18, the BCS was placed at the disposal of the battalion and received the order to place itself at the disposal of the "White" army of General Sergey Voytsekhovsky. Despite the objections of Major Mallet and his deputies, the unit took the road to Gumerovo (the westernmost point that the battalion would reach, about 400 km from Kazan). On December 22, in support of the Russian troops, the BCS engaged in combat with an artillery section and the 2nd company. By January 16, 1919 the BCS withdrew to Petropavlovsk-Kamchatsky and then to Vladivostok, which it reached on September 14, 1919. Commander Mallet handed over his command to Captain Madaule on November 26, 1919.

On January 28, 1920 Bolsheviks entered the city and seized French General Constantin Rozanoff's command post. it was not until February 14, 1920 that order was restored and the battalion left to Nikolsk. On February 17, after crossing the Mongolian border an overloaded train car caught on fire followed by two other cars catching fire. On February 20 the battalion reached Harbin and after several refusals to tow the train in Mukden, troops of the battalion made the final trek to Tianjin (Tien-Tsin) on March 4, 1920 when the battalion was disbanded. The absent men were transferred to the 16th Colonial Infantry Regiment and others were reassigned to the French Mission in Siberia, which was finally repatriated in 1921.

== Notable people ==
Several notable people severed in the Siberian Colonial Battalion including:

- Joseph Kessel

== Awards ==
The Siberian Colonial Battalion received permission to wear the Croix de guerre 1914–1918 on October 18, 1918.

== In fiction ==
The battalion is the core of the novel Les Vents Noir written in 2017 by Arnaud de La Grange.
