= Usabash =

Usabash Усабаш
- Village
- Location within Bashkortostan Location within Russia
- Coordinates: 55°25′N 56°18′E
- Country: Russia
- Region: Bashkortostan
- District: Blagoveshchensky District
- Time zone: UTC+5:00

Usabash (Russian: Усабаш; Bashkir: Уҫыбаш, Uśıbaş) is a rural locality (a village) in Oktyabrsky Selsoviet, Blagoveshchensky District, Bashkortostan, Russia. The population was 93 as of 2010. There is one street.

== Geography ==
Usabash is located 73 km northeast of Blagoveshchensk (the district's administrative centre) by road. Yezhovka is the nearest rural locality.
