= Pekarskaya =

Pekarskaya Пекарская
- Village
- Location within Bashkortostan Location within Russia
- Coordinates: 55°01′N 56°13′E
- Country: Russia
- Region: Bashkortostan
- District: Blagoveshchensky District
- Time zone: UTC+5:00

Pekarskaya (Russian: Пекарская) is a rural locality (a village) in Ilyino-Polyansky Selsoviet, Blagoveshchensky District, Bashkortostan, Russia. The population was 9 as of 2010. There are 2 streets.

== Geography ==
Pekarskaya is located 22 km east of Blagoveshchensk (the district's administrative centre) by road. Turushla is the nearest rural locality.
