= Anninsky =

Anninsky (masculine), Anninskaya (feminine), or Anninskoye (neuter) may refer to:

- Anninsky District, a district of Voronezh Oblast, Russia
- Anninsky (inhabited locality) (Anninskaya, Anninskoye), several rural localities in Russia
