= Anninskaya =

Anninskaya Аннинская
- Village
- Location within Bashkortostan Location within Russia
- Coordinates: 55°10′N 56°30′E
- Country: Russia
- Region: Bashkortostan
- District: Blagoveshchensky District
- Time zone: UTC+5:00

Anninskaya (Russian: Аннинская) is a rural locality (a village) in Staronadezhdinsky Selsoviet, Blagoveshchensky District, Bashkortostan, Russia. The population was 4 as of 2010. There is 1 street.

== Geography ==
Anninskaya is located 58 km northeast of Blagoveshchensk (the district's administrative centre) by road.
