= Bykovo, Republic of Bashkortostan =

Bykovo Быково
- Village
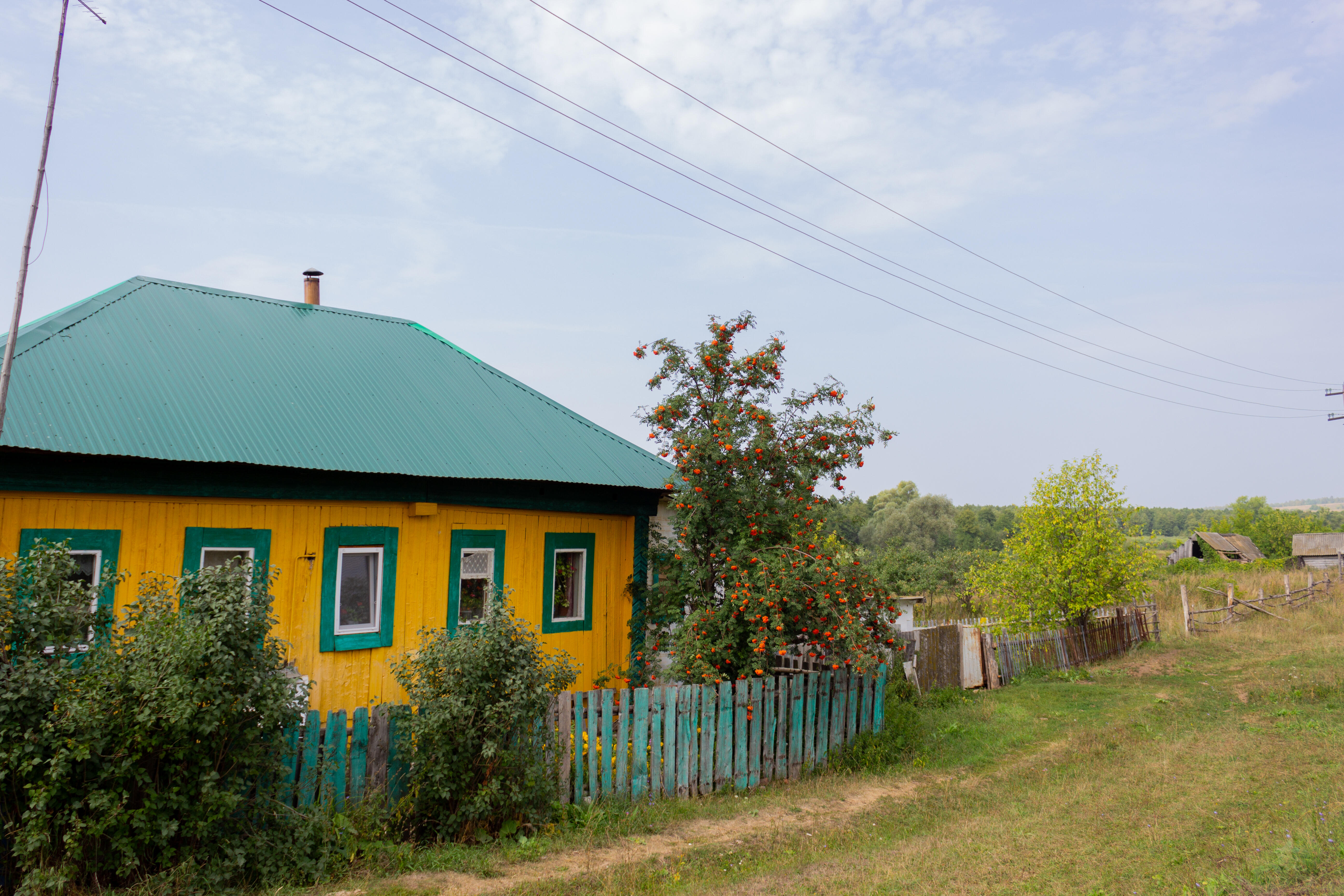

- Location within Bashkortostan Location within Russia
- Coordinates: 55°09′N 56°24′E
- Country: Russia
- Region: Bashkortostan
- District: Blagoveshchensky District
- Time zone: UTC+5:00

Bykovo (Russian: Быково) is a rural locality (a village) in Staronadezhdinsky Selsoviet, Blagoveshchensky District, Bashkortostan, Russia. In 2002, the population was 51. In 2009 it was 53, and in 2010- 44. There is 1 street.

== Geography ==
Bykovo is located 46 km northeast of Blagoveshchensk (the district's administrative centre) by road. Arkaul is the nearest rural locality.
