= Pushkino, Blagoveshchensky District, Republic of Bashkortostan =

Pushkino Пушкино
- Village
- Location within Bashkortostan Location within Russia
- Coordinates: 55°19′N 56°20′E
- Country: Russia
- Region: Bashkortostan
- District: Blagoveshchensky District
- Time zone: UTC+5:00

Pushkino (Russian: Пушкино) is a rural locality (a village) in Bedeyevo-Polyansky Selsoviet, Blagoveshchensky District, Bashkortostan, Russia. The population was 83 as of 2010. There is one street.

== Geography ==
Pushkino is located 47 km northeast of Blagoveshchensk (the district's administrative centre) by road. Bedeyeva Polyana is the nearest rural locality.
