= Bykovo =

Bykovo, from Russian byk (бык), "bull", may refer to:

- Bykovo (inhabited locality), name of several inhabited localities in Russia
- Bykovo Airport, a regional airport outside Moscow
