= Bykovsky (surname) =

Bykovsky, Bykovskyi or Bykovski (Belarusian: Быкоўскі, Russian: Быковский, Ukrainian: Биковський) is a Slavic masculine surname originating from the word byk meaning a bull; its feminine counterpart is Bykovskaya (Belarusian, Russian) or Bykovska (Ukrainian). Phonetic transliteration of the Polish surname Bykowski/Bykowska.

The surname may refer to:

- Ihor Bykovskyi (born 1996), Ukrainian footballer
- Sergey Bykovsky (born 1972), Belarusian boxer
- Valery Bykovsky (1934–2019), Soviet cosmonaut
