= Bykovo, Republic of Buryatia =

Bykovo Быково
- Selo
- Location within Republic of Buryatia Location within Russia
- Coordinates: 52°10′N 106°42′E
- Country: Russia
- Region: Republic of Buryatia
- District: Kabansky District
- Time zone: UTC+8:00

Bykovo (Russian: Быково) is a rural locality (a selo) in Kabansky District, Republic of Buryatia, Russia. The population was 230 as of 2010. There are 3 streets.

== Geography ==
Bykovo is located 39 km (24 mi) northeast of Kabansk (the district's administrative centre) by road. Shergino is the nearest rural locality.
