= Bykovo, Totemsky District, Vologda Oblast =

Bykovo Быково
- Village
- Location within Vologda Oblast Location within Russia
- Coordinates: 59°41′N 41°59′E
- Country: Russia
- Region: Vologda Oblast
- District: Totemsky District
- Time zone: UTC+3:00

Bykovo (Russian: Быково) is a rural locality (a village) in Pogorelovskoye Rural Settlement, Totemsky District, Vologda Oblast, Russia. The population was 52 as of 2002.

== Geography ==
Bykovo is located 60 km southwest of Totma (the district's administrative centre) by road. Zhilino is the nearest rural locality.
