= Bykovo, Irkutsk Oblast =

Bykovo Быково
- Village
- Location within Irkutsk Oblast Location within Russia
- Coordinates: 53°30′N 103°19′E
- Country: Russia
- Region: Irkutsk Oblast
- District: Alarsky District
- Time zone: UTC+8:00

Bykovo (Russian: Быково) is a rural locality (a settlement) in Alarsky District, Irkutsk Oblast, Russia. Population: 127 (2010 census);

== Geography ==
This rural locality is located 39 kilometres (24 mi) from Kutulik (the district's administrative centre), 149 kilometres (93 mi) from Irkutsk (capital of Irkutsk Oblast) and 4,353 kilometres (2,705 mi) from Moscow. Angarsky is the nearest rural locality.
