= Bykovo, Kharovsky District, Vologda Oblast =

Bykovo Быково
- Village
- Location within Vologda Oblast Location within Russia
- Coordinates: 59°52′N 40°00′E
- Country: Russia
- Region: Vologda Oblast
- District: Kharovsky District
- Time zone: UTC+3:00

Bykovo (Russian: Быково) is a rural locality (a village) in Kharovskoye Rural Settlement, Kharovsky District, Vologda Oblast, Russia. The population was 4 as of 2002.

== Geography ==
Bykovo is located 18 km southwest of Kharovsk (the district's administrative centre) by road. Pogost Nikolsky is the nearest rural locality.
