= Bykovo, Cherepovetsky District, Vologda Oblast =

Bykovo Быково
- Village
- Location within Vologda Oblast Location within Russia
- Coordinates: 58°56′N 38°13′E
- Country: Russia
- Region: Vologda Oblast
- District: Cherepovetsky District
- Time zone: UTC+3:00

Bykovo (Russian: Быково) is a rural locality (a village) in Myaksinskoye Rural Settlement, Cherepovetsky District, Vologda Oblast, Russia. The population was 5 as of 2002.

== Geography ==
Bykovo is located 32 km (20 mi) southeast of Cherepovets (the district's administrative centre) by road. Frolkovo is the nearest rural locality.
