= Bykovo, Vladimir Oblast =

Bykovo Быково
- Village
- Location within Vladimir Oblast Location within Russia
- Coordinates: 56°00′N 40°50′E
- Country: Russia
- Region: Vladimir Oblast
- District: Sudogodsky District
- Time zone: UTC+3:00

Bykovo (Russian: Быково) is a rural locality (a village) in Lavrovskoye Rural Settlement, Sudogodsky District, Vladimir Oblast, Russia. The population was 4 as of 2010.

== Geography ==
Bykovo is located 8 km north of Sudogda (the district's administrative centre) by road. Lukhtonovo is the nearest rural locality.
