= Gumerovo, Ishimbaysky District, Republic of Bashkortostan =

Gumerovo Гумерово
- Village
- Location within Bashkortostan Location within Russia
- Coordinates: 53°34′N 56°34′E
- Country: Russia
- Region: Bashkortostan
- District: Ishimbaysky District
- Time zone: UTC+5:00

Gumerovo (Russian: Гумерово; Bashkir: Ғүмәр, Ğümär) is a rural locality (a village) in Ishimbaysky District of the Republic of Bashkortostan, Russia.
