= Bykovo, Vozhegodsky District, Vologda Oblast =

Bykovo Быково
- Village
- Location within Vologda Oblast Location within Russia
- Coordinates: 60°31′N 39°21′E
- Country: Russia
- Region: Vologda Oblast
- District: Vozhegodsky District
- Time zone: UTC+3:00

Bykovo (Russian: Быково) is a rural locality (a village) in Beketovskoye Rural Settlement, Vozhegodsky District, Vologda Oblast, Russia. The population was 12 as of 2002.

== Geography ==
Bykovo is located 58 km northwest of Vozhega (the district's administrative centre) by road. Pilyevo is the nearest rural locality.
