= Gumerovo, Burayevsky District, Republic of Bashkortostan =

Gumerovo Гумерово
- Village
- Location within Bashkortostan Location within Russia
- Coordinates: 55°42′N 55°34′E
- Country: Russia
- Region: Bashkortostan
- District: Burayevsky District
- Time zone: UTC+5:00

Gumerovo (Russian: Гумерово; Bashkir: Ғүмәр, Ğümär) is a rural locality (a village) in Azyakovsky Selsoviet, Burayevsky District, Bashkortostan, Russia. The population was 27 as of 2010. There is 1 street.

== Geography ==
Gumerovo is located 22 km southeast of Burayevo (the district's administrative centre) by road. Novomustafino is the nearest rural locality.
