= Gumerovo, Blagoveshchensky District, Republic of Bashkortostan =

Gumerovo Гумерово
- Village
- Location within Bashkortostan Location within Russia
- Coordinates: 55°21′N 56°17′E
- Country: Russia
- Region: Bashkortostan
- District: Blagoveshchensky District
- Time zone: UTC+5:00

Gumerovo (Russian: Гумерово; Bashkir: Ғүмәр, Ğümär) is a rural locality (a village) in Ilikovsky Selsoviet, Blagoveshchensky District, Bashkortostan, Russia. The population was 59 as of 2010. In this village there is only one street.

== Geography ==
Gumerovo is located 50 km northeast of Blagoveshchensk (the district's administrative centre) by road. Staroilikovo is the nearest rural locality.
