= Bykovo, Shipunovsky District, Altai Krai =

Bykovo Быково
- Selo
- Location within Altai Krai Location within Russia
- Coordinates: 52°08′N 82°10′E
- Country: Russia
- Region: Altai Krai
- District: Shipunovsky District
- Time zone: UTC+7:00

Bykovo (Russian: Быково) is a rural locality (a selo) in Rossiysky Selsoviet, Shipunovsky District, Altai Krai, Russia. The population was 598 as of 2013. There are 6 streets.

== Geography ==
Bykovo is located 13 km southwest of Shipunovo (the district's administrative centre) by road. Kalinovka is the nearest rural locality.
