= Gumerovo, Baymaksky District, Republic of Bashkortostan =

Gumerovo Гумерово
- Village
- Location within Bashkortostan Location within Russia
- Coordinates: 52°35′N 57°57′E
- Country: Russia
- Region: Bashkortostan
- District: Baymaksky District
- Time zone: UTC+5:00

Gumerovo (Russian: Гумерово; Bashkir: Ғүмәр, Ğümär) is a rural locality (a village) in Yaratovsky Selsoviet, Baymaksky District, Bashkortostan, Russia. The population was 367 as of 2010. There are 3 streets.

== Geography ==
Gumerovo is located 33 km west of Baymak (the district's administrative centre) by road. Yaratovo is the nearest rural locality.
