= Bykovo, Shelabolikhinsky District, Altai Krai =

Bykovo Быково
- Selo
- Location within Altai Krai Location within Russia
- Coordinates: 53°31′N 81°55′E
- Country: Russia
- Region: Altai Krai
- District: Shelabolikhinsky District
- Time zone: UTC+7:00

Bykovo (Russian: Быково) is a rural locality (a selo) in Krutishinsky Selsoviet, Shelabolikhinsky District, Altai Krai, Russia. The population was 68 as of 2013. There are 4 streets.

== Geography ==
Bykovo is located 68 km northwest of Shelabolikha (the district's administrative centre) by road. Chaykino is the nearest rural locality.
