= Gumerovo, Kushnarenkovsky District, Republic of Bashkortostan =

Gumerovo Гумерово
- Village
- Location within Bashkortostan Location within Russia
- Coordinates: 55°12′N 55°02′E
- Country: Russia
- Region: Bashkortostan
- District: Kushnarenkovsky District
- Time zone: UTC+5:00

Gumerovo (Russian: Гумерово; Bashkir: Ғүмәр, Ğümär) is a rural locality (a village) in Gorkovsky Selsoviet, Kushnarenkovsky District, Bashkortostan, Russia. The population was 184 as of 2010. There are 2 streets.

== Geography ==
Gumerovo is located 29 km northwest of Kushnarenkovo (the district's administrative centre) by road. Karacha-Yelga is the nearest rural locality.
