= Gumerovo, Mechetlinsky District, Republic of Bashkortostan =

Gumerovo Гумерово
- Village
- Location within Bashkortostan Location within Russia
- Coordinates: 55°39′N 58°19′E
- Country: Russia
- Region: Bashkortostan
- District: Mechetlinsky District
- Time zone: UTC+5:00

Gumerovo (Russian: Гумерово; Bashkir: Ғүмәр, Ğümär) is a rural locality (a village) in Duvan-Mechetlinsky Selsoviet, Mechetlinsky District, Bashkortostan, Russia. The population was 166 as of 2010. There are 3 streets.

== Geography ==
Gumerovo is located 40 km south of Bolsheustyikinskoye (the district's administrative centre) by road. Duvan-Mechetlino is the nearest rural locality.
