= Bykowski =

Bykowski (Polish feminine: Bykowska; plural: Bykowscy) is a surname. It is related to a number of surnames in other languages.

== Related surnames ==
Language	Masculine	Feminine
Polish	Bykowski	Bykowska
Belarusian (Romanization)	Быкоўскі (Bykoŭski)	Быкоўская (Bykouskaya, Bykoŭskaja)
Bulgarian (Romanization)	Биковски (Bikovski)	Биковска (Bikovska)
Lithuanian	Bykauskas; Bikauskas	
Russian (Romanization)	Быковский (Bykovskiy, Bykovskii, Bykovskij, Bykovsky, Bykovski)	Быковская (Bykovskaya, Bykovskaia, Bykovskaja)
Ukrainian (Romanization)	Биковський (Bykovskyi, Bykovskyy, Bykovskyj, Bykovsky)	Биковська (Bykovska)
Other	Bykowsky, Bykofsky, Bycofski	

== People ==
- Carter Bykowski (born 1990), American football player
- Frank Bykowski (1915–1985), American football player
- Maciej Bykowski (born 1977), Polish footballer
- Ron Bykowski, American musician
- Alexander Bykowski (born 1959), Professor
