= Anninskoye, Vologda Oblast =

Anninskoye Аннинское
- Village
- Location within Vologda Oblast Location within Russia
- Coordinates: 59°03′N 40°13′E
- Country: Russia
- Region: Vologda Oblast
- District: Gryazovetsky District
- Time zone: UTC+3:00

Anninskoye (Russian: Аннинское) is a rural locality (a village) in Komyanskoye Rural Settlement, Gryazovetsky District, Vologda Oblast, Russia. The population was 9 as of 2002.

== Geography ==
Anninskoye is located 37 km (23 mi) north of Gryazovets (the district's administrative centre) by road. Svinino is the nearest rural locality.
