= Gumerovo, Davlekanovsky District, Republic of Bashkortostan =

Gumerovo Гумерово
- Village
- Location within Bashkortostan Location within Russia
- Coordinates: 54°10′N 55°32′E
- Country: Russia
- Region: Bashkortostan
- District: Davlekanovsky District
- Time zone: UTC+5:00

Gumerovo (Russian: Гумерово; Bashkir: Ғүмәр, Ğümär) is a rural locality (a village) in Kadyrgulovsky Selsoviet, Davlekanovsky District, Bashkortostan, Russia. The population was 40 as of 2010. There is 1 street.

== Geography ==
Gumerovo is located 44 km southeast of Davlekanovo (the district's administrative centre) by road. Kadyrgulovo is the nearest rural locality.
