= Gumerovo, Aurgazinsky District, Republic of Bashkortostan =

Gumerovo Гумерово
- Village
- Location within Bashkortostan Location within Russia
- Coordinates: 53°58′N 55°43′E
- Country: Russia
- Region: Bashkortostan
- District: Aurgazinsky District
- Time zone: UTC+5:00

Gumerovo (Russian: Гумерово; Bashkir: Ғүмәр, Ğümär) is a rural locality (a village) in Tashtamaksky Selsoviet, Aurgazinsky District, Bashkortostan, Russia. The population was 85 as of 2010. There are 2 streets.

== Geography ==
Gumerovo is located 15 km southwest of Tolbazy (the district's administrative centre) by road. Tursugali is the nearest rural locality.
