= Bykovsky (rural locality) =

Bykovsky (Russian: Быковский; masculine), Bykovskaya (Быковская; feminine), or Bykovskoye (Быковское; neuter) is the name of several rural localities in Russia:

- Bykovsky, Rostov Oblast, a khutor in Nizhnebykovskoye Rural Settlement of Verkhnedonskoy District of Rostov Oblast
- Bykovsky, Sakha Republic, a selo in Bykovsky Natsionalny Rural Okrug of Bulunsky District of the Sakha Republic
- Bykovskaya, Kargopolsky District, Arkhangelsk Oblast, a village in Priozerny Selsoviet of Kargopolsky District of Arkhangelsk Oblast
- Bykovskaya, Velsky District, Arkhangelsk Oblast, a village in Khozminsky Selsoviet of Velsky District of Arkhangelsk Oblast
- Bykovskaya, Kirov Oblast, a village in Bolshevistsky Rural Okrug of Sunsky District of Kirov Oblast
- Bykovskaya, Maryinsky Selsoviet, Vozhegodsky District, Vologda Oblast, a village in Maryinsky Selsoviet of Vozhegodsky District of Vologda Oblast
- Bykovskaya, Mityukovsky Selsoviet, Vozhegodsky District, Vologda Oblast, a village in Mityukovsky Selsoviet of Vozhegodsky District of Vologda Oblast
