= Blagoveshchensk, Bashkortostan =

Town in Bashkortostan, Russia

Blagoveshchensk Благовещенск
- Town

Other transcription(s)
  - Bashkir: Благовещен
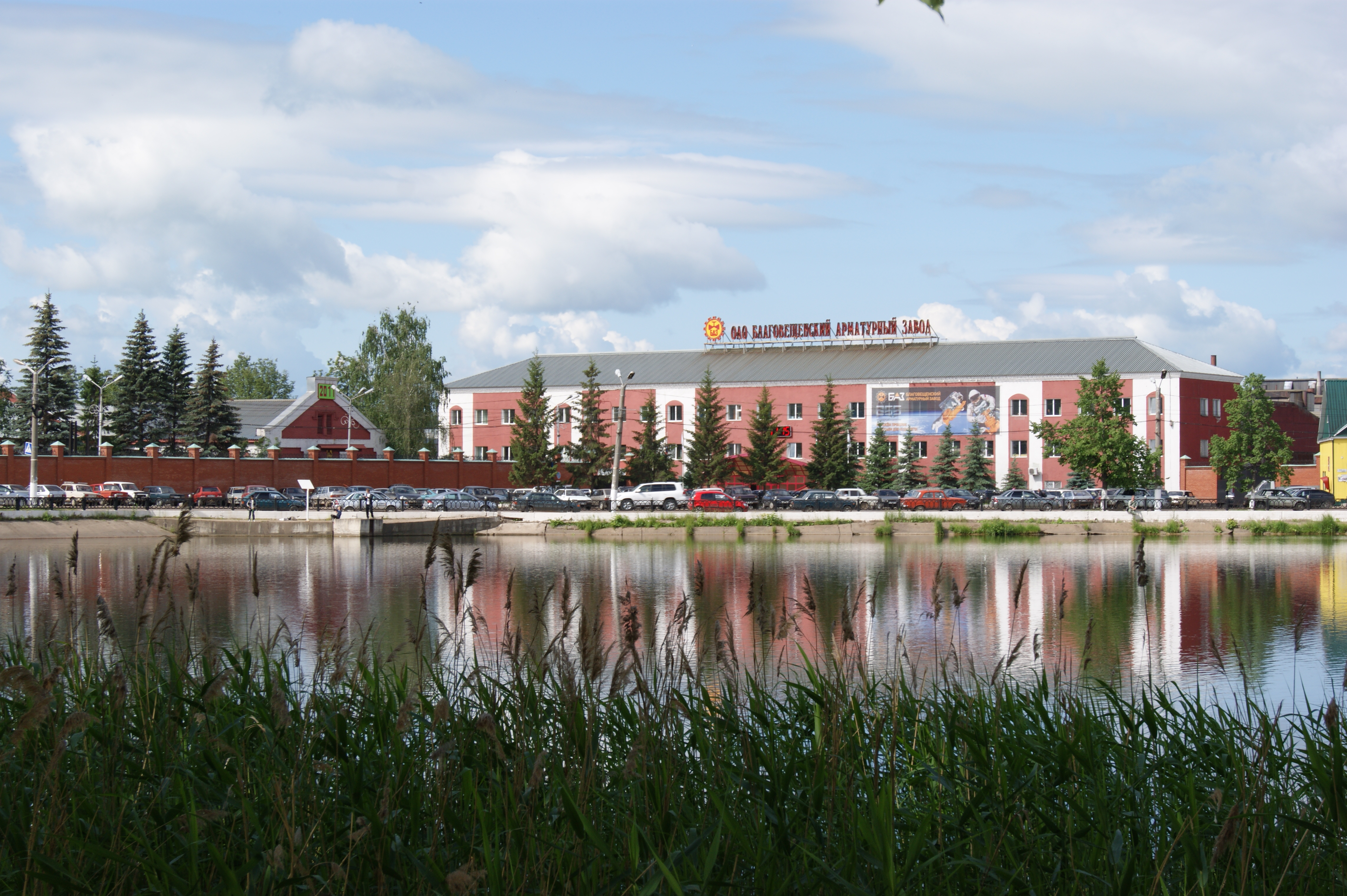
- The building of the former copper melting works

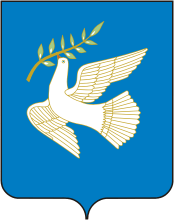
- Flag Coat of arms
- Interactive map of Blagoveshchensk
- Location of Blagoveshchensk Blagoveshchensk (Bashkortostan)
- Coordinates: 55°02′06″N 55°58′41″E
- Country: Russia
- Federal subject: Bashkortostan
- Founded: 1756
- Town status since: 1941
- Elevation: 120 m (390 ft)

Population (2010 Census)
  - Total: 34,239
  - Estimate (2021): 35,481 (+3.6%)

Administrative status
  - Subordinated to: town of republic significance of Blagoveshchensk
  - Capital of: Blagoveshchensky District, town of republic significance of Blagoveshchensk

Municipal status
  - Municipal district: Blagoveshchensky Municipal District
  - Urban settlement: Blagoveshchensk Urban Settlement
  - Capital of: Blagoveshchensky Municipal District, Blagoveshchensk Urban Settlement
- Time zone: UTC+5 (MSK+2)
- Postal codes: 453430, 453431
- OKTMO ID: 80615101001

Blagoveshchensk (Russian: Благове́щенск; Bashkir: Благовещен, romanized: Blagoveşçen) is a town in the Republic of Bashkortostan, Russia, located 42 kilometers (26 mi) north of Ufa on the right bank of the Belaya River. Population: 34,239 (2010 census); 32,989 (2002 census); 27,705 (1989 Soviet census).

== History ==
It was founded in 1756 as a settlement serving the copper melting works and was granted town status in 1941.

== Administrative and municipal status ==
Within the framework of administrative divisions, Blagoveshchensk serves as the administrative center of Blagoveshchensky District, even though it is not a part of it. As an administrative division, it is incorporated separately as the town of republic significance of Blagoveshchensk—an administrative unit with the status equal to that of the districts. As a municipal division, the town of republic significance of Blagoveshchensk is incorporated within Blagoveshchensky Municipal District as Blagoveshchensk Urban Settlement.
