= Blagoveshchensky District, Bashkortostan =

Blagoveshchensky District Благовещенский район (Russian)
- District

Other transcription(s)
  - Bashkir: Благовещен районы
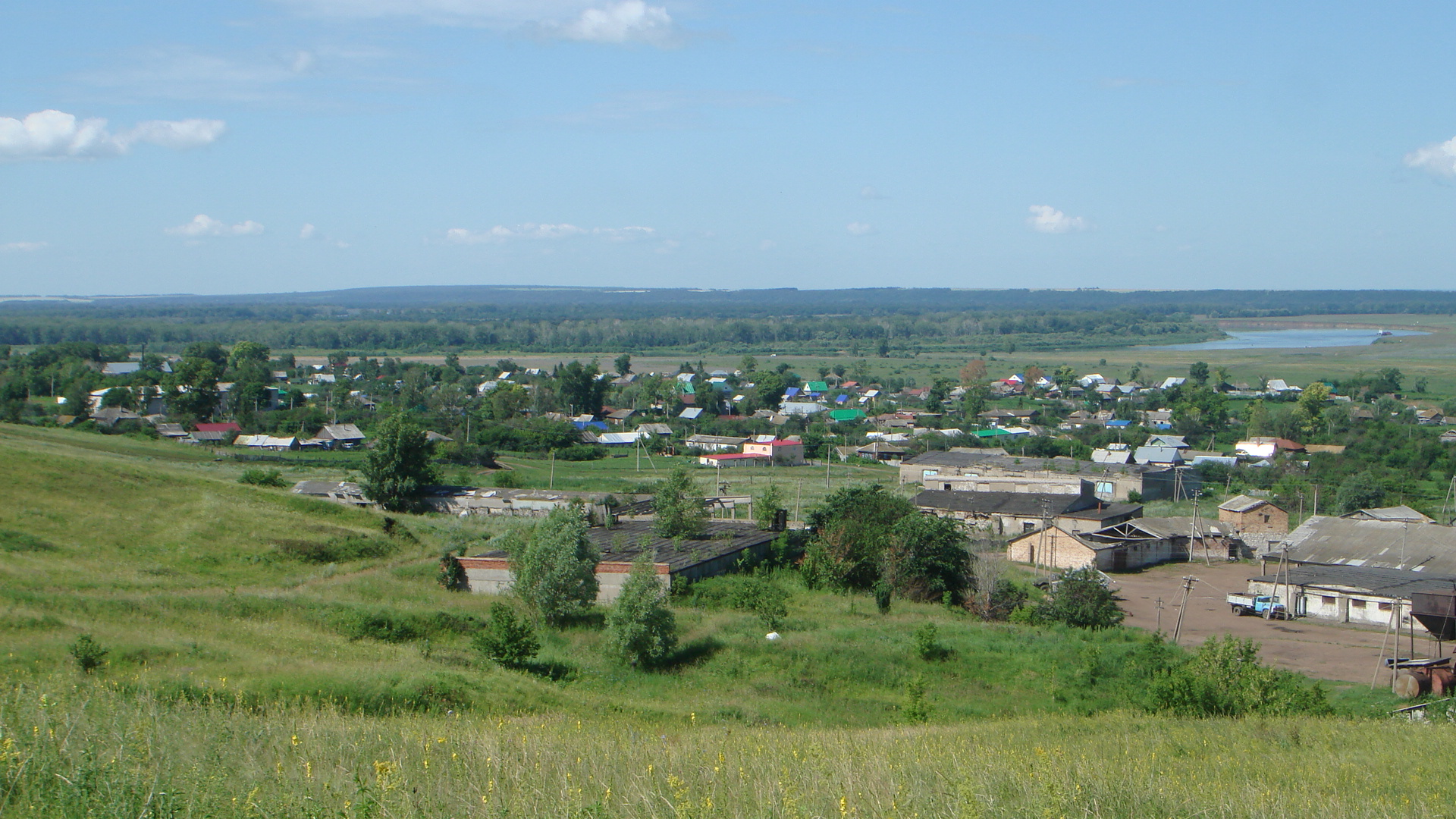
- Village Duvanov in Blagoveshchensky district

- Flag Coat of arms
- Location of Blagoveshchensky District in the Republic of Bashkortostan
- Coordinates: 55°02′N 55°59′E
- Country: Russia
- Federal subject: Republic of Bashkortostan
- Established: 20 August 1930
- Administrative center: Blagoveshchensk

Area
  - Total: 2,250 km^{2} (870 sq mi)

Population (2010 Census)
  - Total: 15,497
  - Density: 6.89/km^{2} (17.8/sq mi)
  - Urban: 0
  - Rural: 100%

Administrative structure
  - Administrative divisions: 15 Selsoviets
  - Inhabited localities: 99 rural localities

Municipal structure
  - Municipally incorporated as: Blagoveshchensky Municipal District
  - Municipal divisions: 1 urban settlements, 15 rural settlements
- Time zone: UTC+5 (MSK+2)
- OKTMO ID: 80615000
- Website: http://www.adm-blagrb.ru

Population of Blagoveshchensky District
- 2010 Census: 15,497
- 2002 Census: 15,861
- 1989 Census: 46,596
- 1979 Census: 43,763

Blagoveshchensky District (Russian: Благове́щенский райо́н; Bashkir: Благовещен районы, romanized: Blagoveşçen rayonı) is an administrative and municipal district (raion), one of the fifty-four in the Republic of Bashkortostan, Russia. It is located in the northern central part of the republic and borders with Karaidelsky District in the north, Nurimanovsky District in the east, Ufimsky District in the south, Kushnarenkovsky District in the southwest, Birsky District in the west, and with Mishkinsky District in the northwest. The area of the district is 2,250 square kilometers (870 sq mi). Its administrative center is the town of Blagoveshchensk (which is not administratively a part of the district). As of the 2010 Census, the total population of the district was 15,497.

== Administrative and municipal status ==
Within the framework of administrative divisions, Blagoveshchensky District is one of the fifty-four in the Republic of Bashkortostan. It is divided into fifteen selsoviets, comprising ninety-nine rural localities. The town of Blagoveshchensk serves as its administrative center, despite being incorporated separately as a town of republic significance—an administrative unit with the status equal to that of the districts.

As a municipal division, the district is incorporated as Blagoveshchensky Municipal District, with the town of republic significance of Blagoveshchensk being incorporated within it as Blagoveshchensk Urban Settlement. Its fifteen selsoviets are incorporated as fifteen rural settlements within the municipal district. The town of BLagoveshchensk serves as the administrative center of the municipal district as well.
