= Razdolny, Russia =

Razdolny (Russian: Раздо́льный; masculine), Razdolnaya (Раздо́льная; feminine), or Razdolnoye (Раздо́льное; neuter) is the name of several rural localities in Russia.

== Modern localities ==
=== Altai Krai ===
As of 2014, four rural localities in Altai Krai bear this name:

Altai Krai distribution map
Distribution in Altai Krai.
- Razdolny, Kamensky District, Altai Krai, a settlement in Poperechensky Selsoviet of Kamensky District; 53°37′N 80°33′E
- Razdolny, Smolensky District, Altai Krai, a settlement in Kirovsky Selsoviet of Smolensky District; 52°18′N 85°01′E
- Razdolnoye, Loktevsky District, Altai Krai, a selo in Zolotukhinsky Selsoviet of Loktevsky District; 50°52′N 81°37′E
- Razdolnoye, Rodinsky District, Altai Krai, a selo in Razdolnensky Selsoviet of Rodinsky District; 52°29′N 79°58′E

=== Amur Oblast ===
As of 2014, three rural localities in Amur Oblast bear this name:

Amur Oblast distribution map
Distribution of the rural localities called Razdolnoye in Amur Oblast.
- Razdolnoye, Mazanovsky District, Amur Oblast, a selo in Novokiyevsky Rural Settlement of Mazanovsky District; 51°33′N 29°02′E
- Razdolnoye, Shimanovsky District, Amur Oblast, a selo in Malinovsky Rural Settlement of Shimanovsky District; 52°06′N 27°47′E
- Razdolnoye, Tambovsky District, Amur Oblast, a selo in Razdolnensky Rural Settlement of Tambovsky District; 50°01′N 27°50′E

=== Astrakhan Oblast ===
As of 2014, one rural locality in Astrakhan Oblast bears this name:

Astrakhan Oblast location map
Location of Razdolny in Astrakhan Oblast
- Razdolny, Astrakhan Oblast, a settlement in Kamennoyarsky Selsoviet of Chernoyarsky District; 48°23′N 45°34′E

=== Chuvash Republic ===
As of 2014, one rural locality in the Chuvash Republic bears this name:

Chuvash Republic location map
Location of Razdolnoye in the Chuvash Republic
- Razdolnoye, Chuvash Republic, a selo in Syresinskoye Rural Settlement of Poretsky District; 55°02′N 46°22′E

=== Republic of Crimea ===
As of 2014, two inhabited localities in the Republic of Crimea bear this name:

Urban localities

- Razdolnoye, Razdolnensky District, Republic of Crimea, an urban-type settlement in Razdolnensky District

Rural localities

- Razdolnoye, Sovetsky District, Republic of Crimea, a selo in Sovetsky District

=== Jewish Autonomous Oblast ===
As of 2014, one rural locality in the Jewish Autonomous Oblast bears this name:

- Razdolnoye, Jewish Autonomous Oblast, a selo in Birobidzhansky District

=== Kaliningrad Oblast ===
As of 2014, four rural localities in Kaliningrad Oblast bear this name:

- Razdolnoye, Bagrationovsky District, Kaliningrad Oblast, a settlement in Pogranichny Rural Okrug of Bagrationovsky District
- Razdolnoye, Nesterovsky District, Kaliningrad Oblast, a settlement in Prigorodny Rural Okrug of Nesterovsky District
- Razdolnoye, Pravdinsky District, Kaliningrad Oblast, a settlement in Domnovsky Rural Okrug of Pravdinsky District
- Razdolnoye, Slavsky District, Kaliningrad Oblast, a settlement in Yasnovsky Rural Okrug of Slavsky District

=== Republic of Kalmykia ===
As of 2014, one rural locality in the Republic of Kalmykia bears this name:

Republic of Kalmykia location map
Location of Razdolny in the Republic of Kalmykia
- Razdolny, Republic of Kalmykia, a settlement in Achinerovskaya Rural Administration of Chernozemelsky District; 45°33′N 45°30′E

=== Kamchatka Krai ===
As of 2014, one rural locality in Kamchatka Krai bears this name:

- Razdolny, Kamchatka Krai, a settlement in Yelizovsky District

=== Kemerovo Oblast ===
As of 2014, two rural localities in Kemerovo Oblast bear this name:

Kemerovo Oblast distribution map
Distribution in Kemerovo Oblast.
- Razdolny, Kemerovo Oblast, a settlement in Razdolnaya Rural Territory of Guryevsky District; 54°17′N 86°00′E
- Razdolnoye, Kemerovo Oblast, a selo in Kalininskaya Rural Territory of Mariinsky District; 56°07′N 87°37′E

=== Krasnodar Krai ===
As of 2014, seven rural localities in Krasnodar Krai bear this name:

Krasnodar Krai distribution map
Distribution in Krasnodar Krai.
- Razdolny, Bryukhovetsky District, Krasnodar Krai, a settlement in Chepiginsky Rural Okrug of Bryukhovetsky District; 45°54′N 38°53′E
- Razdolny, Kanevskoy District, Krasnodar Krai, a khutor in Novoderevyankovsky Rural Okrug of Kanevskoy District; 46°18′N 38°37′E
- Razdolny, Korenovsky District, Krasnodar Krai, a settlement in Novoberezansky Rural Okrug of Korenovsky District; 45°43′N 39°29′E
- Razdolny, Novokubansky District, Krasnodar Krai, a khutor in Sovetsky Rural Okrug of Novokubansky District; 44°48′N 41°03′E
- Razdolnoye, Sochi, Krasnodar Krai, a selo in Razdolsky Rural Okrug under the administrative jurisdiction of Khostinsky City District under the administrative jurisdiction of the City of Sochi; 43°37′N 39°47′E
- Razdolnoye, Kushchyovsky District, Krasnodar Krai, a selo in Razdolnensky Rural Okrug of Kushchyovsky District; 46°42′N 39°40′E
- Razdolnaya, Krasnodar Krai, a stanitsa in Razdolnensky Rural Okrug of Korenovsky District; 45°23′N 39°33′E

=== Krasnoyarsk Krai ===
As of 2014, one rural locality in Krasnoyarsk Krai bears this name:

- Razdolnoye, Krasnoyarsk Krai, a settlement in Razdolnensky Selsoviet of Bolshemurtinsky District

=== Kurgan Oblast ===
As of 2014, one rural locality in Kurgan Oblast bears this name:

Kurgan Oblast location map
Location of Razdolnaya in Kurgan Oblast
- Razdolnaya, Kurgan Oblast, a village in Krasnouralsky Selsoviet of Yurgamyshsky District; 55°21′N 64°28′E

=== Republic of North Ossetia-Alania ===
As of 2014, one rural locality in the Republic of North Ossetia-Alania bears this name:

Republic of North Ossetia-Alania location map
Location of Razdolnoye in the Republic of North Ossetia-Alania
- Razdolnoye, Republic of North Ossetia-Alania, a selo in Razdolnensky Rural Okrug of Mozdoksky District; 43°42′N 44°32′E

=== Novgorod Oblast ===
As of 2014, one rural locality in Novgorod Oblast bears this name:

- Razdolnoye, Novgorod Oblast, a village in Moiseyevskoye Settlement of Maryovsky District

=== Novosibirsk Oblast ===
As of 2014, two rural localities in Novosibirsk Oblast bear this name:

Novosibirsk Oblast distribution map
Distribution in Novosibirsk Oblast.
- Razdolny, Novosibirsk Oblast, a settlement in Iskitimsky District; 54°29′N 83°05′E
- Razdolnoye, Novosibirsk Oblast, a selo in Novosibirsky District; 55°03′N 83°07′E

=== Omsk Oblast ===
As of 2014, one rural locality in Omsk Oblast bears this name:

Omsk Oblast location map
Location of Razdolnoye in Omsk Oblast
- Razdolnoye, Omsk Oblast, a village in Yuzhny Rural Okrug of Pavlogradsky District; 54°05′N 73°59′E

=== Orenburg Oblast ===
As of 2014, one rural locality in Orenburg Oblast bears this name:

- Razdolnoye, Orenburg Oblast, a selo in Studenovsky Selsoviet of Ileksky District

=== Primorsky Krai ===
As of 2014, one rural locality in Primorsky Krai bears this name:

- Razdolnoye, Primorsky Krai, a settlement in Nadezhdinsky District

=== Pskov Oblast ===
As of 2014, one rural locality in Pskov Oblast bears this name:

- Razdolny, Pskov Oblast, a village in Pskovsky District

=== Rostov Oblast ===
As of 2014, one rural locality in Rostov Oblast bears this name:

Rostov Oblast location map
Location of Razdolny in Rostov Oblast
- Razdolny, Rostov Oblast, a khutor in Kiyevskoye Rural Settlement of Remontnensky District; 46°38′N 42°58′E

=== Ryazan Oblast ===
As of 2014, one rural locality in Ryazan Oblast bears this name:

- Razdolnoye, Ryazan Oblast, a selo in Zhmurovsky Rural Okrug of Mikhaylovsky District

=== Sakhalin Oblast ===
As of 2014, three rural localities in Sakhalin Oblast bear this name:

- Razdolnoye, Korsakovsky District, Sakhalin Oblast, a selo in Korsakovsky District
- Razdolnoye, Nevelsky District, Sakhalin Oblast, a selo in Nevelsky District
- Razdolnoye, Smirnykhovsky District, Sakhalin Oblast, a selo in Smirnykhovsky District

=== Saratov Oblast ===
As of 2014, two rural localities in Saratov Oblast bear this name:

- Razdolnoye, Krasnopartizansky District, Saratov Oblast, a selo in Krasnopartizansky District
- Razdolnoye, Lysogorsky District, Saratov Oblast, a settlement in Lysogorsky District

=== Stavropol Krai ===
As of 2014, two rural localities in Stavropol Krai bear this name:

- Razdolny, Stavropol Krai, a khutor in Georgiyevsky Selsoviet of Kochubeyevsky District
- Razdolnoye, Stavropol Krai, a selo in Razdolnensky Selsoviet of Novoalexandrovsky District

=== Sverdlovsk Oblast ===
As of 2014, one rural locality in Sverdlovsk Oblast bears this name:

- Razdolnoye, Sverdlovsk Oblast, a selo in Zarechensky Selsoviet of Kamyshlovsky District

=== Volgograd Oblast ===
As of 2014, two rural localities in Volgograd Oblast bear this name:

- Razdolny, Volgograd Oblast, a settlement in Basakinsky Selsoviet of Chernyshkovsky District
- Razdolnoye, Volgograd Oblast, a selo in Sovkhozsky Selsoviet of Nikolayevsky District

=== Vologda Oblast ===
As of 2014, one rural locality in Vologda Oblast bears this name:

- Razdolnaya, Vologda Oblast, a village in Sukhonsky Selsoviet of Mezhdurechensky District

=== Voronezh Oblast ===
As of 2014, two rural localities in Voronezh Oblast bear this name:

- Razdolny, Voronezh Oblast, a khutor in Nikolskoye Rural Settlement of Bobrovsky District
- Razdolnoye, Voronezh Oblast, a village in Novotroitskoye Rural Settlement of Ternovsky District

=== Zabaykalsky Krai ===
As of 2014, one rural locality in Zabaykalsky Krai bears this name:

== Abolished localities ==
- Razdolny, Troitsky District, Altai Krai, a settlement in Gordeyevsky Selsoviet of Troitsky District in Altai Krai; abolished in October 2012; 53°08′N 84°53′E

== Alternative names ==
- Razdolny, alternative name of Razdolnoye, a selo in Zolotukhinsky Selsoviet of Loktevsky District in Altai Krai; 50°52′N 81°37′E
- Razdolny (or Razdolnoye), alternative name of Razdolnoye, a selo in Razdolnensky Selsoviet of Rodinsky District in Altai Krai; 52°29′N 79°58′E
- Razdolny (or Razdolnaya), alternative name of Razdolnoye, a selo in Malinovsky Rural Settlement of Shimanovsky District in Amur Oblast; 52°06′N 27°47′E
- Razdolny (or Razdolnoye), alternative name of Tatal, a settlement in Tatalskaya Rural Administration of Yustinsky District in the Republic of Kalmykia; 47°18′N 46°16′E
- Razdolny, alternative name of Razdolnoye, a selo in Kalininskaya Rural Territory of Mariinsky District in Kemerovo Oblast; 56°07′N 87°37′E
- Razdolnoye, alternative name of Razdolny, a settlement in Poperechensky Selsoviet of Kamensky District in Altai Krai; 53°37′N 80°33′E
