= Kuchuk =

Kuchuk may refer to:

People

- Al-Ashraf Kujuk (1334 – 1345)
- Kuchuk Hanem (1850 – 1870)
- Küchük Muhammad (1391 – 1459)
- Leonid Kuchuk (b. 1959)
- Kučuk-Alija (1801 – 1804)
- Aliaksei Kuchuk (b. 1986)
- Kuchuk Ahmad Pasha (d. 1636)

Places

- Kuchuk, Altai Krai, a rural locality in Altai Krai, Russia
- Lake Kuchuk, Altai Krai, Russia
- Kuchuk (river), Altai Krai, Russia
- Kuchuk Checmedje, a suburb of Istambul, Turkey
- Nizhny Kuchuk, a rural locality in Altai Krai, Russia
- Stepnoy Kuchuk, a rural locality in Altai Krai, Russia
- Tat-Kuchuk, a rural locality in Bashkortostan, Russia
- Verkh-Kuchuk, a rural locality in Altai Krai, Russia
