= Klyuchi =

Klyuchi (Russian: Ключи; lit. springs) is the name of several rural localities in Russia:

- Klyuchi, Kamchatka Krai, a former town in Kamchatka Oblast; since 2004 — a rural locality; since 2007 — in Kamchatka Krai
- Klyuchi, Biysky District, Altai Krai, a selo in Biysky District of Altai Krai
- Klyuchi, Kamensky District, Altai Krai, a selo in Kamensky District of Altai Krai
- Klyuchi, Klyuchevsky District, Altai Krai, a selo in Klyuchevsky District of Altai Krai
- Klyuchi, Topchikhinsky District, Altai Krai, a settlement in Topchikhinsky District of Altai Krai
- Klyuchi, Tyumenstevsky District, Altai Krai, a selo in Tyumentsevsky District of Altai Krai
- Klyuchi, name of several other rural localities

== See also ==
- Klyuchevsky (disambiguation)
