= Samarsky (rural locality) =

Samarsky (Russian: Самарский; masculine), Samarskaya (Самарская; feminine), or Samarskoye (Самарское; neuter) is the name of several rural localities in Russia:

- Samarsky, Altai Krai, a settlement in Rybinsky Selsoviet of Kamensky District of Altai Krai; 53°31′N 81°20′E
- Samarsky, Chelyabinsk Oblast, a settlement in Forshtadtsky Selsoviet of Verkhneuralsky District of Chelyabinsk Oblast
- Samarsky, Novosibirsk Oblast, a settlement in Toguchinsky District of Novosibirsk Oblast
- Samarsky, Alexandrovsky District, Orenburg Oblast, a settlement in Marksovsky Selsoviet of Alexandrovsky District of Orenburg Oblast
- Samarsky, Perevolotsky District, Orenburg Oblast, a khutor in Perevolotsky Settlement Council of Perevolotsky District of Orenburg Oblast
- Samarsky, Matveyevo-Kurgansky District, Rostov Oblast, a khutor in Novonikolayevskoye Rural Settlement of Matveyevo-Kurgansky District of Rostov Oblast
- Samarsky, Tselinsky District, Rostov Oblast, a khutor in Kirovskoye Rural Settlement of Tselinsky District of Rostov Oblast
- Samarsky, Samara Oblast, a settlement in Volzhsky District of Samara Oblast
- Samarsky (khutor), Tula Oblast, a khutor in Samarskaya Volost of Kurkinsky District of Tula Oblast
- Samarsky (settlement), Tula Oblast, a settlement in Samarskaya Volost of Kurkinsky District of Tula Oblast
- Samarskoye, Abzelilovsky District, Republic of Bashkortostan, a village in Tashtimerovsky Selsoviet of Abzelilovsky District of the Republic of Bashkortostan
- Samarskoye, Khaybullinsky District, Republic of Bashkortostan, a selo in Samarsky Selsoviet of Khaybullinsky District of the Republic of Bashkortostan
- Samarskoye, Kaliningrad Oblast, a settlement under the administrative jurisdiction of the town of district significance of Krasnoznamensk in Krasnoznamensky District of Kaliningrad Oblast
- Samarskoye, Rostov Oblast, a selo in Samarskoye Rural Settlement of Azovsky District of Rostov Oblast

Alternative names

- Samarsky, alternative name of Samarka, a selo in Samarsky Selsoviet of Rubtsovsky District in Altai Krai; 51°22′N 81°16′E
