= Seleznyovo, Altai Krai =

Seleznyovo Селезнёво
- Selo
- Location within Altai Krai Location within Russia
- Coordinates: 53°29′N 82°09′E
- Country: Russia
- Region: Altai Krai
- District: Shelabolikhinsky District
- Time zone: UTC+7:00

Seleznyovo (Russian: Селезнёво) is a rural locality (a selo) in Kiprinsky Selsoviet, Shelabolikhinsky District, Altai Krai, Russia. The population was 494 as of 2013. There are 11 streets.

== Geography ==
Seleznyovo is located 36 km west of Shelabolikha (the district's administrative centre) by road. Omutskoye is the nearest rural locality.
