= 3 Internatsional =

3 Internatsional 3 Интернационал
- Settlement
- Location within Altai Krai Location within Russia
- Coordinates: 53°52′N 81°35′E
- Country: Russia
- Region: Altai Krai
- District: Kamensky District
- Time zone: UTC+7:00

3 Internatsional (Russian: 3 Интернационал) is a rural locality (a settlement) in Verkh-Allaksky Selsoviet, Kamensky District, Altai Krai, Russia. The population was 4 as of 2013. There are 2 streets.

== Geography ==
3 Internatsional is located 22 km northeast of Kamen-na-Obi (the district's administrative centre) by road. Verkh-Allak is the nearest rural locality.
