= Kiprino, Altai Krai =

Kiprino Киприно
- Selo
- Location within Altai Krai Location within Russia
- Coordinates: 53°31′N 82°03′E
- Country: Russia
- Region: Altai Krai
- District: Shelabolikhinsky District
- Time zone: UTC+7:00

Kiprino (Russian: Киприно) is a rural locality (a selo) and the administrative center of Kiprinsky Selsoviet, Shelabolikhinsky District, Altai Krai, Russia. The population was 1,192 as of 2013. There are 17 streets.

== Geography ==
Kiprino is located 44 km northwest of Shelabolikha (the district's administrative centre) by road. Seleznyovo is the nearest rural locality.
