= Novotroitsk, Rodinsky District, Altai Krai =

Novotroitsk Новотроицк
- Settlement
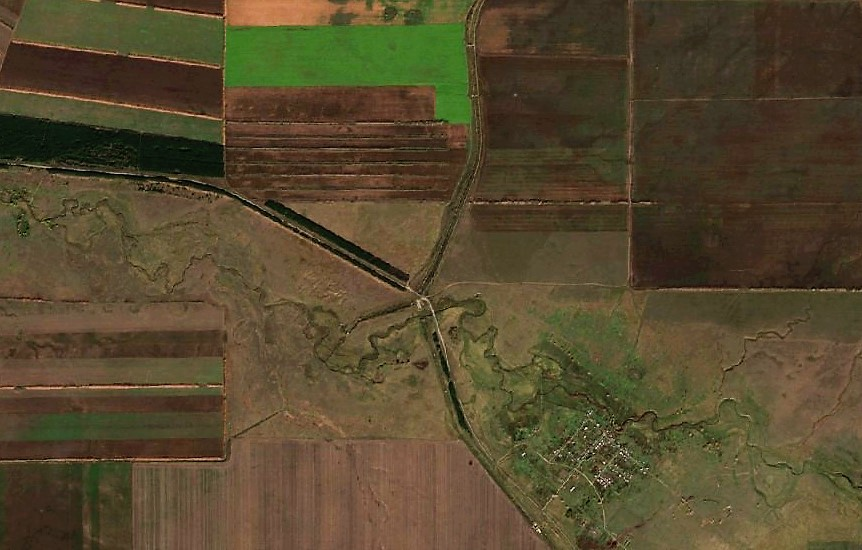

- Location within Altai Krai Location within Russia
- Coordinates: 52°39′N 80°08′E
- Country: Russia
- Region: Altai Krai
- District: Rodinsky District
- Time zone: UTC+7:00

Novotroitsk (Russian: Новотроицк) is a rural locality (a settlement) in Mirnensky Selsoviet, Rodinsky District, Altai Krai, Russia. The population was 321 as of 2013. There are 8 streets.

== Geography ==
Novotroitsk is located by the Kuchuk river at the end of the Kulunda Main Canal. It lies 19 km north of Rodino (the district's administrative centre) by road. Mirny is the nearest rural locality.
