= Podvetrenno-Teleutskoye =

Podvetrenno-Teleutskoye Подветренно-Телеутское
- Selo
- Location within Altai Krai Location within Russia
- Coordinates: 53°28′N 81°12′E
- Country: Russia
- Region: Altai Krai
- District: Kamensky District
- Time zone: UTC+7:00

Podvetrenno-Teleutskoye (Russian: Подветренно-Телеутское) is a rural locality (a selo) in Teleutsky Selsoviet, Kamensky District, Altai Krai, Russia. The population was 50 as of 2013. There are 5 streets.

== Geography ==
Podvetrenno-Teleutskoye is located 49 km southwest of Kamen-na-Obi (the district's administrative centre) by road. Vetrenno-Teleutskoye is the nearest rural locality.
