= Shubinka, Rodinsky District, Altai Krai =

Shubinka Шубинка
- Settlement
- Location within Altai Krai Location within Russia
- Coordinates: 52°45′N 80°20′E
- Country: Russia
- Region: Altai Krai
- District: Rodinsky District
- Time zone: UTC+7:00

Shubinka (Russian: Шубинка) is a rural locality (a settlement) in Pokrovsky Selsoviet, Rodinsky District, Altai Krai, Russia. The population was 25 as of 2013. There are 3 streets.

== Geography ==
Shubinka is located 37 km north of Rodino (the district's administrative centre) by road. Pokrovka is the nearest rural locality.
