= Sakmarino =

Sakmarino Сакмарино
- Selo
- Location within Altai Krai Location within Russia
- Coordinates: 53°31′N 82°06′E
- Country: Russia
- Region: Altai Krai
- District: Shelabolikhinsky District
- Time zone: UTC+7:00

Sakmarino (Russian: Сакмарино) is a rural locality (a selo) in Kiprinsky Selsoviet, Shelabolikhinsky District, Altai Krai, Russia. The population was 5 as of 2013. There are 2 streets.

== Geography ==
Sakmarino is located 45 km northwest of Shelabolikha (the district's administrative centre) by road. Kiprino is the nearest rural locality.
