= Chaykino, Altai Krai =

Chaykino Чайкино
- Selo
- Location within Altai Krai Location within Russia
- Coordinates: 53°30′N 81°52′E
- Country: Russia
- Region: Altai Krai
- District: Shelabolikhinsky District
- Time zone: UTC+7:00

Chaykino (Russian: Чайкино) is a rural locality (a selo) in Krutishinsky Selsoviet, Shelabolikhinsky District, Altai Krai, Russia. The population was 243 as of 2013. There are 6 streets.

== Geography ==
Chaykino is located 63 km west of Shelabolikha (the district's administrative centre) by road. Bykovo is the nearest rural locality.
