= Rodino (rural locality) =

Rodino (Russian: Родино) is the name of several rural localities in Russia:

- Rodino, Rodinsky District, Altai Krai, a selo in Rodinsky Selsoviet of Rodinsky District of Altai Krai
- Rodino, Shipunovsky District, Altai Krai, a selo in Rodinsky Selsoviet of Shipunovsky District of Altai Krai
- Rodino, Ivanovo Oblast, a village in Pestyakovsky District of Ivanovo Oblast
- Rodino, Kirov Oblast, a village in Loshkarinsky Rural Okrug of Sovetsky District of Kirov Oblast
- Rodino, Mezhevskoy District, Kostroma Oblast, a village in Nikolskoye Settlement of Mezhevskoy District of Kostroma Oblast
- Rodino, Parfenyevsky District, Kostroma Oblast, a village in Matveyevskoye Settlement of Parfenyevsky District of Kostroma Oblast
- Rodino, Smolensk Oblast, a village in Vysokovskoye Rural Settlement of Novoduginsky District of Smolensk Oblast
- Rodino, Tver Oblast, a village in Privolzhskoye Rural Settlement of Kimrsky District of Tver Oblast
- Rodino, Ferapontovsky Selsoviet, Kirillovsky District, Vologda Oblast, a village in Ferapontovsky Selsoviet of Kirillovsky District of Vologda Oblast
- Rodino, Goritsky Selsoviet, Kirillovsky District, Vologda Oblast, a village in Goritsky Selsoviet of Kirillovsky District of Vologda Oblast
