= Myski, Altai Krai =

Myski Мыски
- Settlement
- Location within Altai Krai Location within Russia
- Coordinates: 53°41′30″N 81°32′19″E
- Country: Russia
- Region: Altai Krai
- District: Kamensky District
- Time zone: UTC+7:00

Myski (Russian: Мыски) is a rural locality (a settlement) in Gonokhovsky Selsoviet, Kamensky District, Altai Krai, Russia. The population was 90 as of 2013. There are 5 streets.

== Geography ==
Myski is located 34 km southeast of Kamen-na-Obi (the district's administrative centre) by road. Gonokhovo is the nearest rural locality.
