= Novosyolovka, Altai Krai =

Novosyolovka Новосёловка
- Selo
- Location within Altai Krai Location within Russia
- Coordinates: 53°28′N 82°14′E
- Country: Russia
- Region: Altai Krai
- District: Shelabolikhinsky District
- Time zone: UTC+7:00

Novosyolovka (Russian: Новосёловка) is a rural locality (a selo) in Kiprinsky Selsoviet, Shelabolikhinsky District, Altai Krai, Russia. The population was 40 people in 2013. There are 3 streets.

== Geography ==
Novosyolovka is located 36 km west of Shelabolikha (the district's administrative centre) by road. Omutskoye is the nearest rural locality.
