= Voznesenka, Rodinsky District, Altai Krai =

Voznesenka Вознесенка
- Selo
- Location within Altai Krai Location within Russia
- Coordinates: 52°20′N 80°27′E
- Country: Russia
- Region: Altai Krai
- District: Rodinsky District
- Time zone: UTC+7:00

Voznesenka (Russian: Вознесенка) is a rural locality (a selo) in Tsentralny Selsoviet, Rodinsky District, Altai Krai, Russia. The population was 394 in 2013. There are 6 streets.

== Geography ==
Voznesenka is located 27 km southeast of Rodino (the district's administrative centre) by road. Tsentralnoye is the nearest rural settlement. The Kuchuk River has its sources 8 km (5.0 mi) to the south of the village.
