= Kayaushka =

Kayaushka Каяушка
- Selo
- Location within Altai Krai Location within Russia
- Coordinates: 52°29′N 80°27′E
- Country: Russia
- Region: Altai Krai
- District: Rodinsky District
- Time zone: UTC+7:00

Kayaushka (Russian: Каяушка) is a rural locality (a selo) and the administrative center of Kayaushinsky Selsoviet, Rodinsky District, Altai Krai, Russia. The population was 424 as of 2013. There are 4 streets.

== Geography ==
Kayaushka is located on the banks of the Kuchuk river, 17 km (11 mi) east of Rodino (the district's administrative centre) by road. Zelyonaya Dubrava is the nearest rural locality.
