= Novoyarki =

Novoyarki Новоярки
- Selo
- Location within Altai Krai Location within Russia
- Coordinates: 53°35′N 80°52′E
- Country: Russia
- Region: Altai Krai
- District: Kamensky District
- Time zone: UTC+7:00

Novoyarki (Russian: Новоярки) is a rural locality (a selo) and the administrative center of Novoyarkovsky Selsoviet, Kamensky District, Altai Krai, Russia. The population was 1,168 as of 2013. There are 18 streets.

== Geography ==
Novoyarki is located 42 km southwest of Kamen-na-Obi (the district's administrative centre) by road. Poperechnoye is the nearest rural locality.
