= Plotnikovo, Kamensky District, Altai Krai =

Plotnikovo Плотниково
- Selo
- Location within Altai Krai Location within Russia
- Coordinates: 53°32′N 81°31′E
- Country: Russia
- Region: Altai Krai
- District: Kamensky District
- Time zone: UTC+7:00

Plotnikovo (Russian: Плотниково) is a rural locality (a selo) in Plotnikovsky Selsoviet, Kamensky District, Altai Krai, Russia. The population was 75 as of 2013. There are 5 streets.

== Geography ==
Plotnikovo is located 38 km southeast of Kamen-na-Obi (the district's administrative centre) by road. Lugovoye is the nearest rural locality.
