= Sokolovo, Kamensky District, Altai Krai =

Sokolovo Соколово
- Selo
- Location within Altai Krai Location within Russia
- Coordinates: 53°59′N 81°18′E
- Country: Russia
- Region: Altai Krai
- District: Kamensky District
- Time zone: UTC+7:00

Sokolovo (Russian: Соколово) is a rural locality (a selo) in Stolbovsky Selsoviet, Kamensky District, Altai Krai, Russia. The population was 3 as of 2013. There are 6 streets.

== Geography ==
Sokolovo is located 34 km north of Kamen-na-Obi (the district's administrative centre) by road. Dresvyanka is the nearest rural locality.
