= Kornilovo =

Kornilovo Корнилово
- Selo
- Location within Altai Krai Location within Russia
- Coordinates: 53°31′N 81°04′E
- Country: Russia
- Region: Altai Krai
- District: Kamensky District
- Time zone: UTC+7:00

Kornilovo (Russian: Корнилово) is a rural locality (a selo) and the administrative center of Kornilovsky Selsoviet, Kamensky District, Altai Krai, Russia. The population was 1,350 as of 2013. There are 26 streets.

== Geography ==
Kornilovo is located 38 km southwest of Kamen-na-Obi (the district's administrative centre) by road. Podvetrenno-Teleutskoye is the nearest rural locality.
