= Krasny Altay =

Krasny Altay Красный Алтай
- Settlement
- Location within Altai Krai Location within Russia
- Coordinates: 52°17′N 80°17′E
- Country: Russia
- Region: Altai Krai
- District: Rodinsky District
- Time zone: UTC+7:00

Krasny Altay (Russian: Красный Алтай) is a rural locality (a settlement) in Tsentralny Selsoviet, Rodinsky District, Altai Krai, Russia. The population was 416 as of 2013. There are 3 streets.

== Geography ==
Krasny Altay is located 34 km south of Rodino (the district's administrative centre) by road. Tsentralnoye is the nearest rural locality.
