= Maletino =

Maletino (Russian: Малетино) is the name of several rural localities (selos and villages) in Russia:

- Maletino, Altai Krai, a selo in Stolbovsky Selsoviet of Kamensky District of Altai Krai
- Maletino, Krasnoborsky District, Arkhangelsk Oblast, a village in Berezonavolotsky Selsoviet of Krasnoborsky District of Arkhangelsk Oblast
- Maletino, Pinezhsky District, Arkhangelsk Oblast, a village in Pinezhsky Selsoviet of Pinezhsky District of Arkhangelsk Oblast
- Maletino, Kurgan Oblast, a village in Nizhnevsky Selsoviet of Kurtamyshsky District of Kurgan Oblast
