= Dukhovaya =

Dukhovaya Духовая
- Village
- Location within Altai Krai Location within Russia
- Coordinates: 53°47′N 81°41′E
- Country: Russia
- Region: Altai Krai
- District: Kamensky District
- Time zone: UTC+7:00

Dukhovaya (Russian: Духовая) is a rural locality (a village) in Allaksky Selsoviet, Kamensky District, Altai Krai, Russia. The population was 88 as of 2013. There are 3 streets.

== Geography ==
Dukhovaya is located on the Priobskoye plato, 27 km east of Kamen-na-Obi (the district's administrative centre) by road. Allak is the nearest rural locality.
