= Tsentralnoye, Altai Krai =

Tsentralnoye Центральное
- Selo
- Location within Altai Krai Location within Russia
- Coordinates: 52°18′N 80°24′E
- Country: Russia
- Region: Altai Krai
- District: Rodinsky District
- Time zone: UTC+7:00

Tsentralnoye (Russian: Центральное) is a rural locality (a selo) and the administrative center of Tsentralny Selsoviet, Rodinsky District, Altai Krai, Russia. The population was 524 as of 2013. There are 12 streets.

== Geography ==
Tsentralnoye is located 1.5 km (0.93 mi) west of the Kuchuk river, 29 km (18 mi) southeast of Rodino (the district's administrative centre) by road. Voznesenka is the nearest rural locality.
