= Latkinsky =

Latkinsky Латкинский
- Settlement
- Location within Altai Krai Location within Russia
- Coordinates: 53°10′N 81°30′E
- Country: Russia
- Region: Altai Krai
- District: Tyumentsevsky District
- Time zone: UTC+7:00

Latkinsky (Russian: Латкинский) is a rural locality (a settlement) and the administrative center of Korolyovsky Selsoviet, Tyumentsevsky District, Altai Krai, Russia. The population was 36 as of 2013. It was founded in 1918. There are 2 streets.

== Geography ==
Latkinsky is located 21 km south of Tyumentsevo (the district's administrative centre) by road. Korolyovsky is the nearest rural locality.
