= Inya, Altai Krai =

Inya Иня
- Selo
- Location within Altai Krai Location within Russia
- Coordinates: 53°30′N 82°40′E
- Country: Russia
- Region: Altai Krai
- District: Shelabolikhinsky District
- Time zone: UTC+7:00

Inya (Russian: Иня) is a rural locality (a selo) and the administrative center of Inskoy Selsoviet, Shelabolikhinsky District, Altai Krai, Russia. The population was 628 as of 2013. There are 7 streets.

== Geography ==
Inya is located 14 km north of Shelabolikha (the district's administrative centre) by road. Shelabolikha is the nearest rural locality.
