= Zelyony Lug =

Zelyony Lug Зелёный Луг
- Selo
- Location within Altai Krai Location within Russia
- Coordinates: 52°22′N 80°08′E
- Country: Russia
- Region: Altai Krai
- District: Rodinsky District
- Time zone: UTC+7:00

Zelyony Lug (Russian: Зелёный Луг) is a rural locality (a selo) and the administrative center of Zelyonolugovskoy Selsoviet, Rodinsky District, Altai Krai, Russia. The population was 523 as of 2013. There are 6 streets.

== Geography ==
Zelyony Lug is located 16 km south of Rodino (the district's administrative centre) by road. Shatalovka is the nearest rural locality.
