= Razumovka =

Razumovka Разумовка
- Selo
- Location within Altai Krai Location within Russia
- Coordinates: 52°33′N 79°43′E
- Country: Russia
- Region: Altai Krai
- District: Rodinsky District
- Time zone: UTC+7:00

Razumovka (Russian: Разумовка) is a rural locality (a selo) in Razdolnensky Selsoviet, Rodinsky District, Altai Krai, Russia. The population was 329 as of 2013. There are 8 streets.

== Geography ==
Razumovka is located 40 km west of Rodino (the district's administrative centre) by road. Tizek is the nearest rural locality.
