= Yudikha =

Yudikha Юдиха
- Selo
- Location within Altai Krai Location within Russia
- Coordinates: 53°26′N 81°56′E
- Country: Russia
- Region: Altai Krai
- District: Tyumentsevsky District
- Time zone: UTC+7:00

Yudikha (Russian: Юдиха) is a rural locality (a selo) in and the administrative center of Yudikhinsky Selsoviet, Tyumentsevsky District, Altai Krai, Russia. The population was 483 as of 2013. It was founded in 1823. There are 7 streets.

== Geography ==
Yudikha is located 34 km east of Tyumentsevo (the district's administrative centre) by road. Krutishka is the nearest rural locality.
