= Vyacheslavka =

Vyacheslavka Вячеславка
- Settlement
- Location within Altai Krai Location within Russia
- Coordinates: 52°49′N 80°26′E
- Country: Russia
- Region: Altai Krai
- District: Rodinsky District
- Time zone: UTC+7:00

Vyacheslavka (Russian: Вячеславка) is a rural locality (a settlement) in Pokrovsky Selsoviet, Rodinsky District, Altai Krai, Russia. The population was 190 as of 2013. There are 2 streets.

== Geography ==
Vyacheslavka is located 44 km north of Rodino (the district's administrative centre) by road. Kalinovka is the nearest rural locality.
