= Verkh-Allak =

Verkh-Allak Верх-Аллак
- Selo
- Location within Altai Krai Location within Russia
- Coordinates: 53°52′N 81°39′E
- Country: Russia
- Region: Altai Krai
- District: Kamensky District
- Time zone: UTC+7:00

Verkh-Allak (Russian: Верх-Аллак) is a rural locality (a selo) and the administrative center of Verkh-Allaksky Selsoviet, Kamensky District, Altai Krai, Russia. The population was 483 as of 2013. There are 11 streets.

== Geography ==
Verkh-Allak is located on the Priobskoye plato, 27 km northeast of Kamen-na-Obi (the district's administrative centre) by road. 3 Internatsional is the nearest rural locality.
