= Lugovoye, Shelabolikhinsky District, Altai Krai =

Lugovoye Луговое
- Selo
- Location within Altai Krai Location within Russia
- Coordinates: 53°27′N 82°18′E
- Country: Russia
- Region: Altai Krai
- District: Shelabolikhinsky District
- Time zone: UTC+7:00

Lugovoye (Russian: Луговое) is a rural locality (a selo) in Ilyinsky Selsoviet, Shelabolikhinsky District, Altai Krai, Russia. The population was 73 as of 2013. There are 2 streets.

== Geography ==
Lugovoye is located 24 km northwest of Shelabolikha (the district's administrative centre) by road. Ilyinka is the nearest rural locality.
