= Zelyonaya Dubrava =

Zelyonaya Dubrava Зелёная Дубрава
- Settlement
- Location within Altai Krai Location within Russia
- Coordinates: 53°40′N 80°42′E
- Country: Russia
- Region: Altai Krai
- District: Kamensky District
- Time zone: UTC+7:00

Zelyonaya Dubrava (Russian: Зелёная Дубрава) is a rural locality (a settlement) in Filippovsky Selsoviet, Kamensky District, Altai Krai, Russia. The population was 108 as of 2013. There are 3 streets.

== Geography ==
Zelyonaya Dubrava is located 62 km southwest of Kamen-na-Obi (the district's administrative centre) by road. Filippovsky is the nearest rural locality.
