= Makarovo, Altai Krai =

Makarovo Макарово
- Selo
- Location within Altai Krai Location within Russia
- Coordinates: 53°17′N 81°59′E
- Country: Russia
- Region: Altai Krai
- District: Shelabolikhinsky District
- Time zone: UTC+7:00

Makarovo (Russian: Макарово) is a rural locality (a selo) and the administrative center of Makarovsky Selsoviet, Shelabolikhinsky District, Altai Krai, Russia. The population was 479 as of 2013. There are 7 streets.

== Geography ==
Makarovo is located 51 km southwest of Shelabolikha (the district's administrative centre) by road. Ust-Mosikha is the nearest rural locality.
