= Vetrenno-Teleutskoye =

Vetrenno-Teleutskoye Ветренно-Телеутское
- Selo
- Location within Altai Krai Location within Russia
- Coordinates: 53°27′N 81°10′E
- Country: Russia
- Region: Altai Krai
- District: Kamensky District
- Time zone: UTC+7:00

Vetrenno-Teleutskoye (Russian: Ветренно-Телеутское) is a rural locality (a selo) and the administrative center of Teleutsky Selsoviet, Kamensky District, Altai Krai, Russia. The population was 282 as of 2013. There are 5 streets.

== Geography ==
Vetrenno-Teleutskoye is located 52 km southwest of Kamen-na-Obi (the district's administrative centre) by road. Podvetrenno-Teleutskoye is the nearest rural locality.
