= Allak =

Allak Аллак
- Selo
- Location within Altai Krai Location within Russia
- Coordinates: 53°48′N 81°31′E
- Country: Russia
- Region: Altai Krai
- District: Kamensky District
- Time zone: UTC+7:00

Allak (Russian: Аллак) is a rural locality (a selo) and the administrative center of Allaksky Selsoviet, Kamensky District, Altai Krai, Russia. The population was 974 as of 2013. There are 13 streets.

== Geography ==
Allak is located 17 km east of Kamen-na-Obi (the district's administrative centre) by road. Plotinnaya is the nearest rural locality.
