= Klyuchi, Kamensky District, Altai Krai =

Klyuchi Ключи
- Selo
- Location within Altai Krai Location within Russia
- Coordinates: 53°58′N 81°28′E
- Country: Russia
- Region: Altai Krai
- District: Kamensky District
- Time zone: UTC+7:00

Klyuchi (Russian: Ключи) is a rural locality (a selo) in Stolbovsky Selsoviet, Kamensky District, Altai Krai, Russia. The population was 63 as of 2013. There are 3 streets.

== Geography ==
Klyuchi is located 31 km northeast of Kamen-na-Obi (the district's administrative centre) by road. Stolbovo is the nearest rural locality.
