= Maletino, Altai Krai =

Maletino Малетино
- Selo
- Location within Altai Krai Location within Russia
- Coordinates: 54°02′N 81°24′E
- Country: Russia
- Region: Altai Krai
- District: Kamensky District
- Time zone: UTC+7:00

Maletino (Russian: Малетино) is a rural locality (a selo) in Stolbovsky Selsoviet, Kamensky District, Altai Krai, Russia. The population was 68 as of 2013. There are 2 streets.

== Geography ==
Maletino is located 41 km north of Kamen-na-Obi (the district's administrative centre) by road. Klyuchi is the nearest rural locality.
