= Samarsky, Altai Krai =

Samarsky Settlement
- Selo
- Location within Altai Krai Location within Russia
- Coordinates: 53°31′N 81°19′E
- Country: Russia
- Region: Altai Krai
- District: Kamensky District
- Time zone: UTC+7:00

Samarsky (Russian: Самарский) is a rural locality (a settlement) in Rybinsky Selsoviet, Kamensky District, Altai Krai, Russia. The population was 90 as of 2013. There are 4 streets.

== Geography ==
Samarsky is located 40 km south of Kamen-na-Obi (the district's administrative centre) by road. Rybnoye is the nearest rural locality.
