= Gorkoye (Tyumentsevsky District) =

Salt lake in Altai Krai, Russia

- Горькое
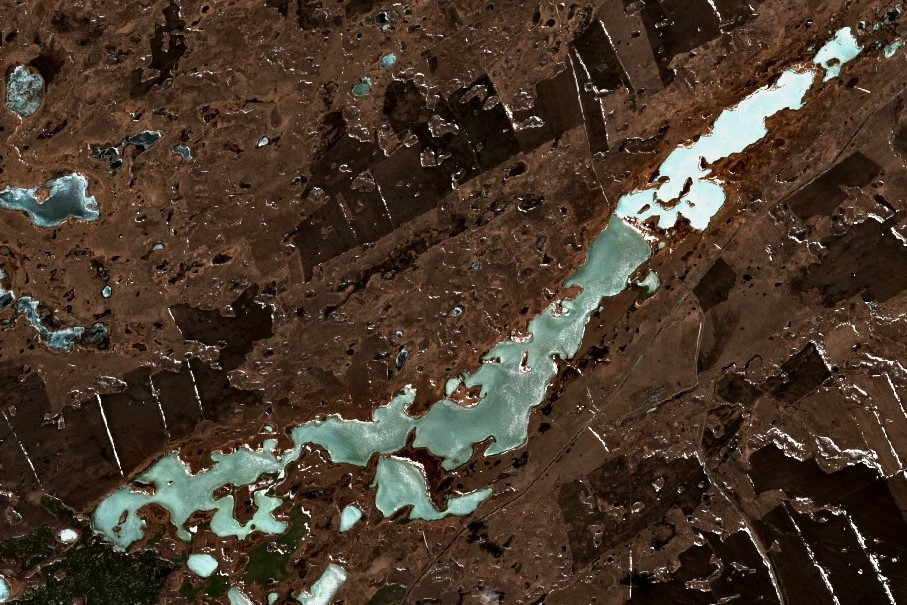
- Sentinel-2 image of the still frozen lake in April

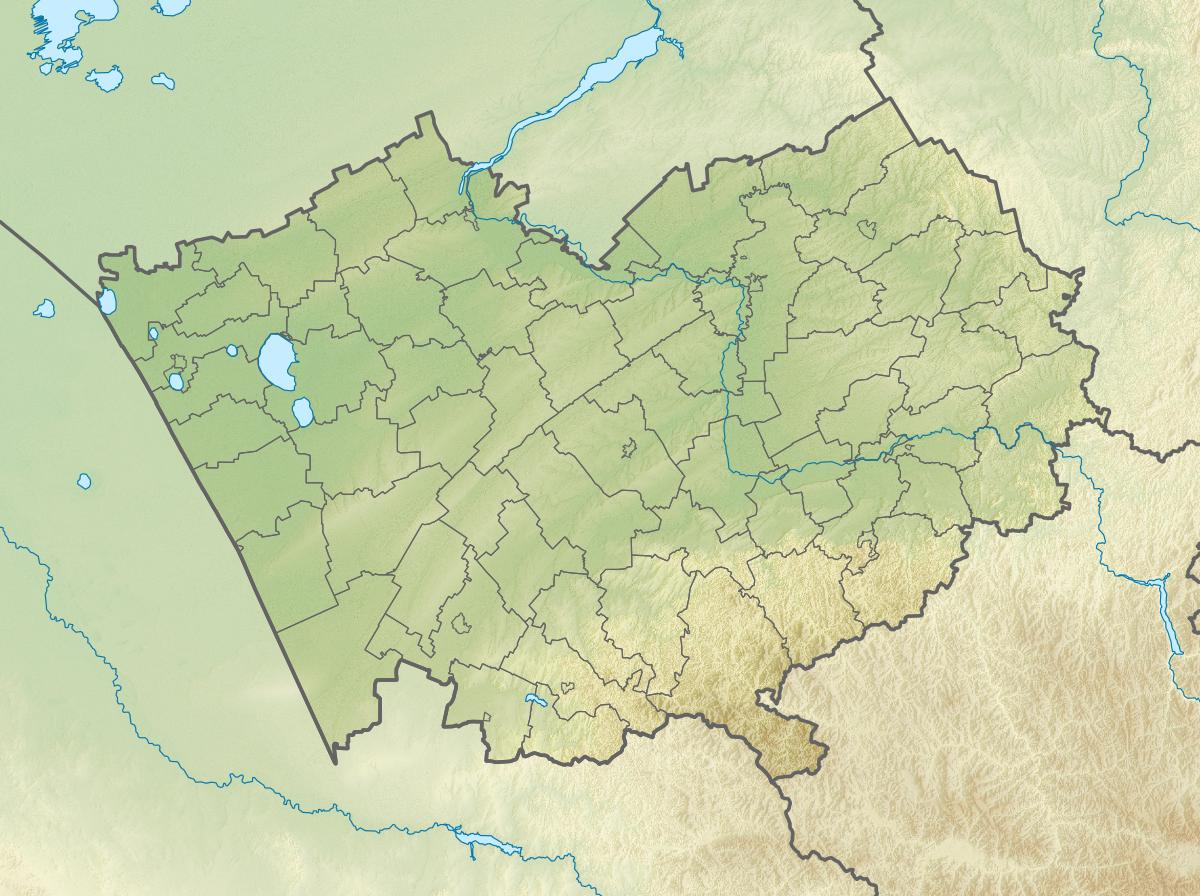
- Location within Altai Krai Location within Russia
- Location: Ob Plateau; West Siberian Plain
- Coordinates: 53°26′31″N 81°20′20″E
- Type: endorheic
- Basin countries: Russia
- Max. length: 20.5 kilometers (12.7 mi)
- Max. width: 1.8 kilometers (1.1 mi)
- Surface area: ca 26 square kilometers (10 sq mi)
- Residence time: UTC+6
- Surface elevation: 132 meters (433 ft)
- Islands: Yes

Gorkoye (Russian: Горькое) is a salt lake in Tyumentsevsky District, Altai Krai, Russian Federation.

The lake lies in the northern part of the Krai and there are no inhabited places by the lakeshore. The nearest town is Klyuchi, 2 kilometers (1.2 mi) from the eastern side. Tyumentsevo, the district capital, lies 13 kilometers (8.1 mi) to the south.

== Geography ==
With a length of 20 kilometers (12 mi), Gorkoye is one of the longest lakes in Altai Krai and the largest in Tyumentsevsky District. It lies in one of the wide ravines of glacial origin that cut diagonally across the Ob Plateau. The lake has an elongated shape, stretching roughly from northeast to southwest. The shores are flat and often deeply indented, forming bays and peninsulas. There are a few relatively large islands in the southern section. The water is moderately saline and the bottom is sandy. The lake freezes in the winter and it does not dry in the summer.

The Kulunda Main Canal, built at the time of the USSR, runs roughly in a SW/NE direction only 1 kilometer (0.62 mi) to the east of the eastern lakeshore. River Ob flows 27 kilometers (17 mi) to the north of Gorkoye's northern end. Less than 1 kilometer (0.62 mi) to the southwest lies smaller lake Bolshoye Utichye. Lake Mostovoye is located 17 kilometers (11 mi) to the southwest.

== Flora and fauna ==
Reeds cover long stretches of the Gorkoye lakeshore. The crucian carp is one of the main fish species living in the lake's waters. The building of the Kulunda Main Canal disrupted the Gorkoye ecosystem and some fish species died out.

== See also ==
- List of lakes of Russia
