= Samarsky =

Samarsky (masculine), Samarskaya (feminine), or Samarskoye (neuter) may refer to:

People

- Alexander Andreevich Samarskii (1919–2008), Soviet and Russian mathematician
- Mikhail Samarsky (b. 1996), Russian writer and public figure
- Vassili Samarsky-Bykhovets (1803–1870), chief of Russian Mining Engineering Corps (1845–1861)

Places

- Samara Oblast (Samarskaya oblast), a federal subject of Russia
- Samarsky City District, a city district of Samara in Samara Oblast, Russia
- Samarsky (rural locality) (Samarskaya, Samarskoye), several rural localities in Russia
- Samarskaya (Samara Metro), a planned station of the Samara Metro, Samara, Russia
