= Razdolnoye, Rodinsky District, Altai Krai =

Razdolnoye Раздольное
- Selo
- Location within Altai Krai Location within Russia
- Coordinates: 52°29′N 79°57′E
- Country: Russia
- Region: Altai Krai
- District: Rodinsky District
- Time zone: UTC+7:00

Razdolnoye (Russian: Раздольное) is a rural locality (a selo) and the administrative center of Razdolnensky Selsoviet, Rodinsky District, Altai Krai, Russia. The population was 835 as of 2013. There are 10 streets.

== Geography ==
Razdolnoye is located 21 km west of Rodino (the district's administrative centre) by road. Markovka and Rodino are the nearest rural localities.
