= Razdolny, Kamensky District, Altai Krai =

Razdolny Раздольный
- Settlement
- Location within Altai Krai Location within Russia
- Coordinates: 53°36′N 80°32′E
- Country: Russia
- Region: Altai Krai
- District: Kamensky District
- Time zone: UTC+7:00

Razdolny (Russian: Раздольный) is a rural locality (a settlement) in Poperechensky Selsoviet, Kamensky District, Altai Krai, Russia. The population was 175 as of 2013. There are 3 streets.

== Geography ==
Razdolny is located 66 km southwest of Kamen-na-Obi (the district's administrative centre) by road. Filippovsky is the nearest rural locality.
