= Verkh-Kuchuk =

Verkh-Kuchuk Верх-Кучук
- Selo
- Location within Altai Krai Location within Russia
- Coordinates: 53°21′N 82°14′E
- Country: Russia
- Region: Altai Krai
- District: Shelabolikhinsky District
- Time zone: UTC+7:00

Verkh-Kuchuk (Russian: Верх-Кучук) is a rural locality (a selo) and the administrative center of Verkh-Kuchuksky Selsoviet, Shelabolikhinsky District, Altai Krai, Russia. The population was 1,044 as of 2013. There are 12 streets.

== Geography ==
Verkh-Kuchuk is located 40 km west of Shelabolikha (the district's administrative centre) by road. Ivanovka is the nearest rural locality.
