= Omutskoye =

Omutskoye Омутское
- Selo
- Location within Altai Krai Location within Russia
- Coordinates: 53°28′N 82°12′E
- Country: Russia
- Region: Altai Krai
- District: Shelabolikhinsky District
- Time zone: UTC+7:00

Omutskoye (Russian: Омутское) is a rural locality (a selo) in Kiprinsky Selsoviet, Shelabolikhinsky District, Altai Krai, Russia. The population was 413 as of 2013. There are 9 streets.

== Geography ==
Omutskoye is located 33 km west of Shelabolikha (the district's administrative centre) by road. Novosyolovka is the nearest rural locality.
