= Rodino =

Rodino may refer to:

- Peter W. Rodino (1909–2005), American politician
- Rodino (rural locality), several rural localities in Russia
