= Kuchuk, Altai Krai =

Kuchuk Кучук
- Selo
- Location within Altai Krai Location within Russia
- Coordinates: 53°26′N 82°28′E
- Country: Russia
- Region: Altai Krai
- District: Shelabolikhinsky District
- Time zone: UTC+7:00

Kuchuk (Russian: Кучук) is a rural locality (a selo) and the administrative center of Kuchuksky Selsoviet, Shelabolikhinsky District, Altai Krai, Russia. The population was 994 as of 2013. There are 12 streets.

== Geography ==
Kuchuk is located 15 km northwest of Shelabolikha (the district's administrative centre) by road. Sibirka is the nearest rural locality.
