= Stepnoy Kuchuk =

Stepnoy Kuchuk Степной Кучук
- Selo
- Location within Altai Krai Location within Russia
- Coordinates: 52°35′N 80°20′E
- Country: Russia
- Region: Altai Krai
- District: Rodinsky District
- Time zone: UTC+7:00

Stepnoy Kuchuk (Russian: Степной Кучук) is a rural locality (a selo) and the administrative center of Stepno-Kuchuksky Selsoviet, Rodinsky District, Altai Krai, Russia. The population was 1,040 as of 2013. There are 7 streets.

== Geography ==
Stepnoy Kuchuk is located on the Kuchuk River, 16 km northeast of Rodino (the district's administrative centre) by road. Stepnoye is the nearest rural locality.
