= Plotinnaya =

Plotinnaya Плотинная
- Railway station
- Location within Altai Krai Location within Russia
- Coordinates: 53°47′N 81°25′E
- Country: Russia
- Region: Altai Krai
- District: Kamensky District
- Time zone: UTC+7:00

Plotinnaya (Russian: Плотинная) is a rural locality (a railway station) of West Siberian Railway in Kamensky District, Altai Krai, Russia. The population was 746 as of 2016. There are 7 streets.

== Geography ==
Plotinnaya is located on the right bank of the Ob River, 8 km east of Kamen-na-Obi (the district's administrative centre) by road. Kamen-na-Obi is the nearest rural locality.
