= Klyuchi (Tyumenstevsky District) =

Klyuchi Ключи
- Settlement
- Location within Altai Krai Location within Russia
- Coordinates: 53°26′52″N 81°25′10″E
- Country: Russia
- Region: Altai Krai
- District: Tyumentsevsky District
- Elevation: 151 m (495 ft)
- Time zone: UTC+7:00
- Postcode: 658597

Klyuchi (Russian: Ключи) is a rural locality (a settlement) and the administrative center of Klyuchevsky Village Council, Tyumentsevsky District, Altai Krai, Russian Federation.

The village was founded in 1776. Population: 542 (2010 census); 631 (2002 census);

== Geography ==
Kliuchy is located 2 kilometers (1.2 mi) to the east of lake Gorkoye, 0.6 kilometers (0.37 mi) from the Kulunda Main Canal. Tyumentsevo, the district capital, lies 16 kilometers (9.9 mi) to the south.
