= Kuchuk (river) =

River in Siberia, Russia

Kuchuk Кучук
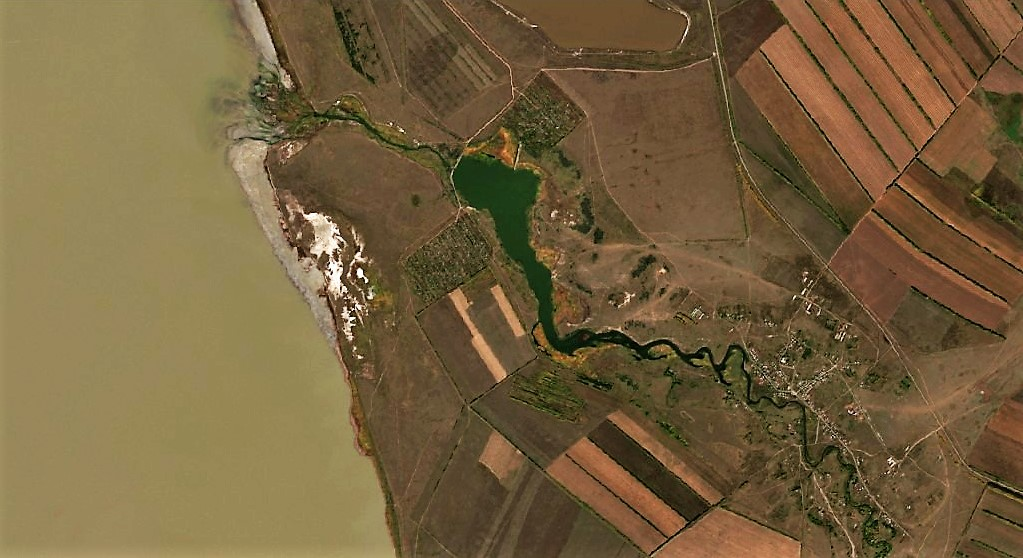
- Last stretch of the Kuchuk river and mouth in lake Kuchuk Sentinel-2 image

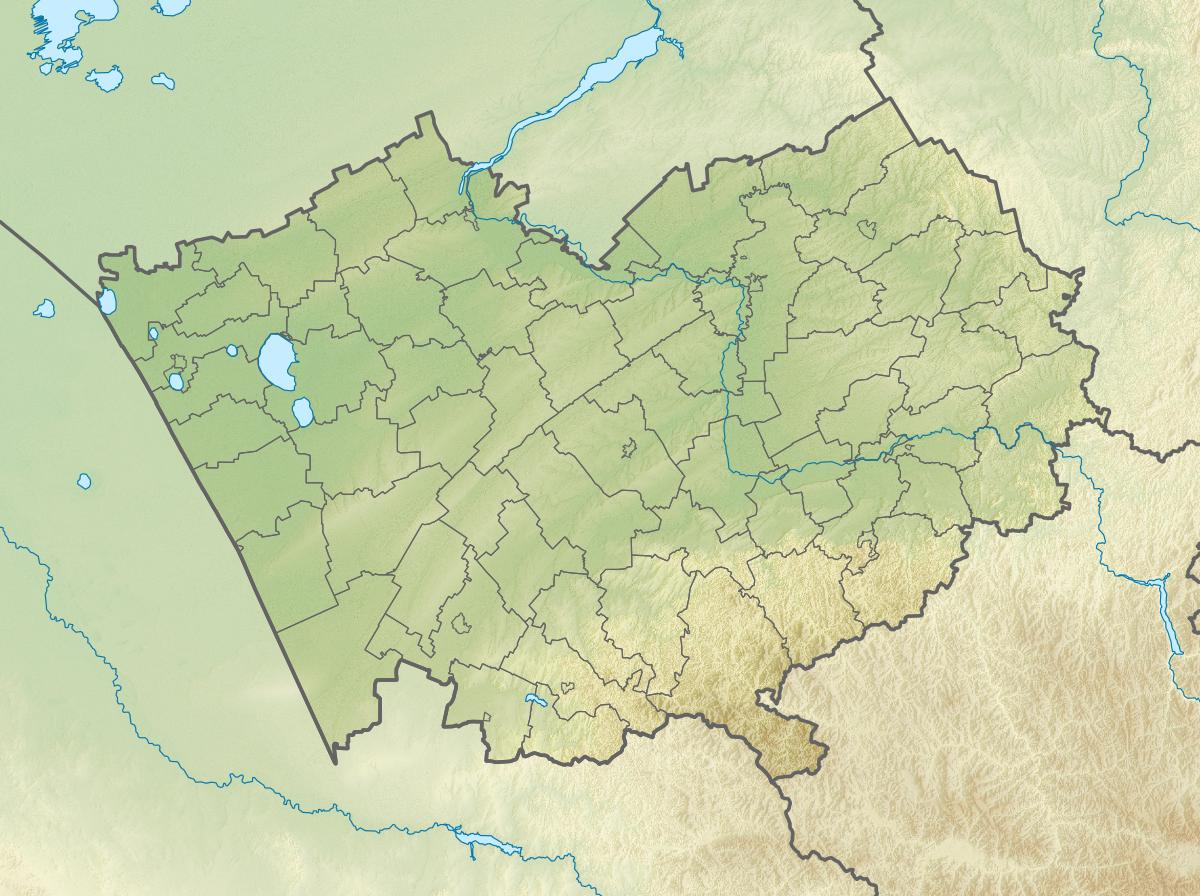
- Mouth location in Altai Krai, Russia

Location
- Country: Russia

Physical characteristics
- Source: Near Voznesenka
  - coordinates: 52°15′48″N 80°24′51″E
  - elevation: 277 metres (909 ft)
- Mouth: Lake Kuchuk
  - coordinates: 52°44′46″N 79°50′27″E
  - elevation: 98 metres (322 ft)
- Length: 121 km (75 mi)
- Basin size: 1,020 km^{2} (390 sq mi)

The Kuchuk (Russian: Кучук) is a river in Altai Krai, Russia. The river is 121 kilometres (75 mi) long and has a catchment area of 1,020 square kilometres (390 sq mi).

The basin of the river is located in the Rodinsky and Blagoveshchensky districts. There are a number of villages near its banks, such as Nizhny Kuchuk, Stepnoy Kuchuk, Kayaushka, Novotroitsk, Voznesenka and Tsentralnoye. The ghost-town of Verkh-Nezamay is also located by the river. Founded in 1910, it was abolished in 2003.

== Course ==
The Kuchuk river system is an endorheic basin between the Ob and the Irtysh rivers. The sources are at the southwestern end of the Ob Plateau, in lake Zhir-Kain, a small lake located 8 kilometres (5.0 mi) to the south of Voznesenka. In its upper course the river flows northwards, then it bends westwards and flows meandering in a roughly western direction within the Kulunda Plain. In its last stretch it heads in a roughly northwestern direction. The end of the Kulunda Main Canal is located by the Kuchuk near Novotroitsk. Finally the river meets the eastern shore of Lake Kuchuk about 5 km (3.1 mi) northwest of Nizhny Kuchuk.

=== Tributaries ===
The longest tributary of the Kuchuk is an unnamed 14 km (8.7 mi) long river joining it from the left 93 km (58 mi) from its mouth. The river is largely fed by groundwater. It is frozen between November and April.

== See also ==
- List of rivers of Russia
