= Kulunda Main Canal =

Irrigation canal in Russia

Kulunda Main Canal Кулундинский магистральный канал
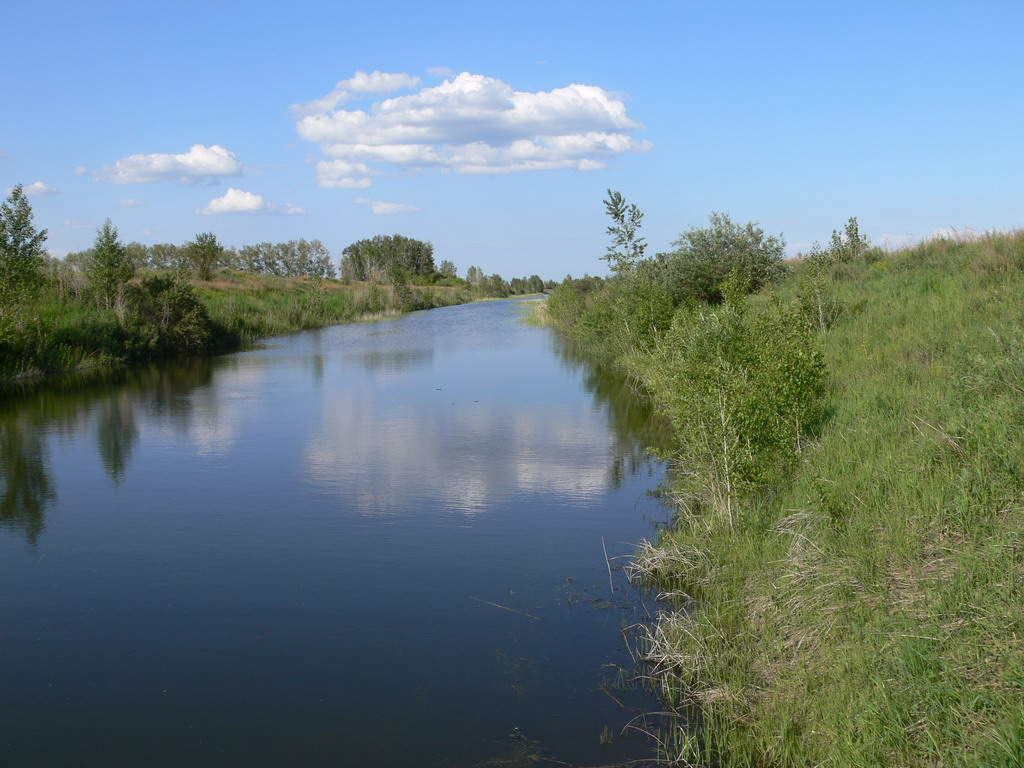
- The canal near Glyaden village

Specifications
- Length: 182 km (113 mi)
- Status: Unfinished

History
- Construction began: August 1973
- Date completed: November 1983

Geography
- Start point: Ob river
- End point: Kuchuk river
- Beginning coordinates: 53°44′54″N 81°21′04″E
- Ending coordinates: 52°40′20″N 80°07′07″E

The Kulunda Main Canal (Russian: Кулундинский магистральный канал) is an irrigation canal in Altai Krai, Russian Federation. The canal was built to bring water to the Kulunda Steppe, a region periodically subjected to severe droughts.

== Topography ==
The canal begins close to Kamen-na-Obi and runs first southwards; shortly thereafter it heads in a southeast direction then it bends and runs in a roughly southwest direction. It passes through the Kamensky, Tyumentsevsky, Bayevsky, Blagoveshchensky and Rodinsky districts. The total length of the canal is 182 km (113 mi) with a capacity of 25 m^{3}/s (883 cu ft/s) and two pumping stations. The main pumping station is in Kamen-na-Obi and it pumps the water of the Ob river at an elevation of 113 m (371 ft) to the edge of the Ob Plateau at an elevation of 140 m (459 ft). The secondary one is further south in Klyuchi village, Tyumentsevsky District.

The canal ends at the Kuchuk river close to Novotroitsk. A 120 km (75 mi) extension reaching Zlatopol was projected, but never carried out.

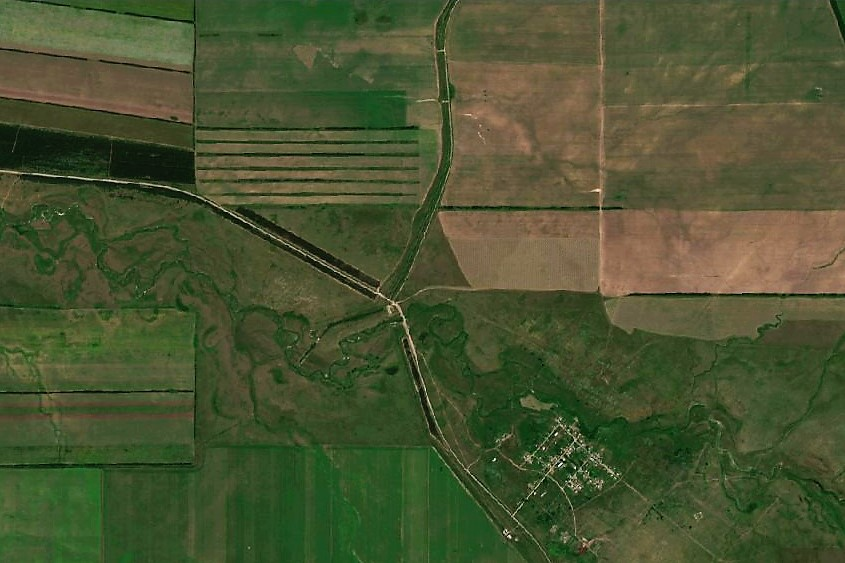
End of the Kulunda Main Canal near Novotroitsk

== History ==
Construction of the canal began in August 1973, at the time of the USSR. The project had been put forward at the beginning of the decade and aimed to irrigate 20,000 ha (49,421 acres) in the area of Novotroitsk, as well as Zlatopol, located further west near the Kazakhstan–Russia border. Besides, it was expected that the canal would also benefit 18,500 ha (45,714 acres) of agricultural fields and around 45,000 ha (111,197 acres) of pastureland in the areas located by the eastern section of the canal.

=== Current situation ===
In present times the surfaces watered by the canal have diminished. The canal has become silted in some places with water overflowing its banks in heavy rain, leading to the flooding of inhabited areas. In other stretches its waters are absorbed by the sandy soil, owing to the deterioration of the original watertight coating. The canal crosses areas with various types of soil, including clayey, sandy, loamy, and solonetz soils. A length totaling approximately 80 km (50 mi) running through sandy soil sectors was planned to be provided with an anti-filtration polyethylene coating over a 1 m (3 ft) thick protective layer of soil. But in the end only a 20 km (12 mi) length of canal sections were treated against filtration and the coating has a lifetime of about 30 years, which already ran out by the turn of the millennium. Plans for the maintenance and overhaul of the canal have been put forward, but so far they have not been implemented.

== Ecological impact ==
The Kulunda Main Canal runs roughly in a NE/SW direction only 1 kilometer (0.62 mi) to the east of lake Gorkoye, a long salt lake. The building of the canal disrupted the Gorkoye ecosystem by increasing the salinity of the lake and some fish species died out.
