= Razdolnoye, Shimanovsky District, Amur Oblast =

Razdolnoye Раздольное
- Selo
- Location within Amur Oblast Location within Russia
- Coordinates: 52°05′N 127°46′E
- Country: Russia
- Region: Amur Oblast
- District: Shimanovsky District
- Time zone: UTC+9:00

Razdolnoye (Russian: Раздольное) is a rural locality (a selo) in Malinovsky Selsoviet of Shimanovsky District, Amur Oblast, Russia. The population was 43 as of 2018. There is 1 street.

== Geography ==
Razdolnoye is located 17 km northeast of Shimanovsk (the district's administrative centre) by road. Bazisnoye is the nearest rural locality.
