= Klyuchi, Biysky District, Altai Krai =

Klyuchi Ключи
- Selo
- Location within Altai Krai Location within Russia
- Coordinates: 52°35′N 85°38′E
- Country: Russia
- Region: Altai Krai
- District: Biysky District
- Time zone: UTC+7:00

Klyuchi (Russian: Ключи) is a rural locality (a selo) in Usyatsky Selsoviet, Biysky District, Altai Krai, Russia. The population was 227 as of 2013. There are 31 streets.

== Geography ==
Klyuchi is located 33 km east of Biysk (the district's administrative centre) by road. Stan-Bekhtemir is the nearest rural locality.
