= Samarskoye, Abzelilovsky District, Republic of Bashkortostan =

Samarskoye Самарское
- Village
- Location within Bashkortostan Location within Russia
- Coordinates: 53°31′N 58°43′E
- Country: Russia
- Region: Bashkortostan
- District: Abzelilovsky District
- Time zone: UTC+5:00

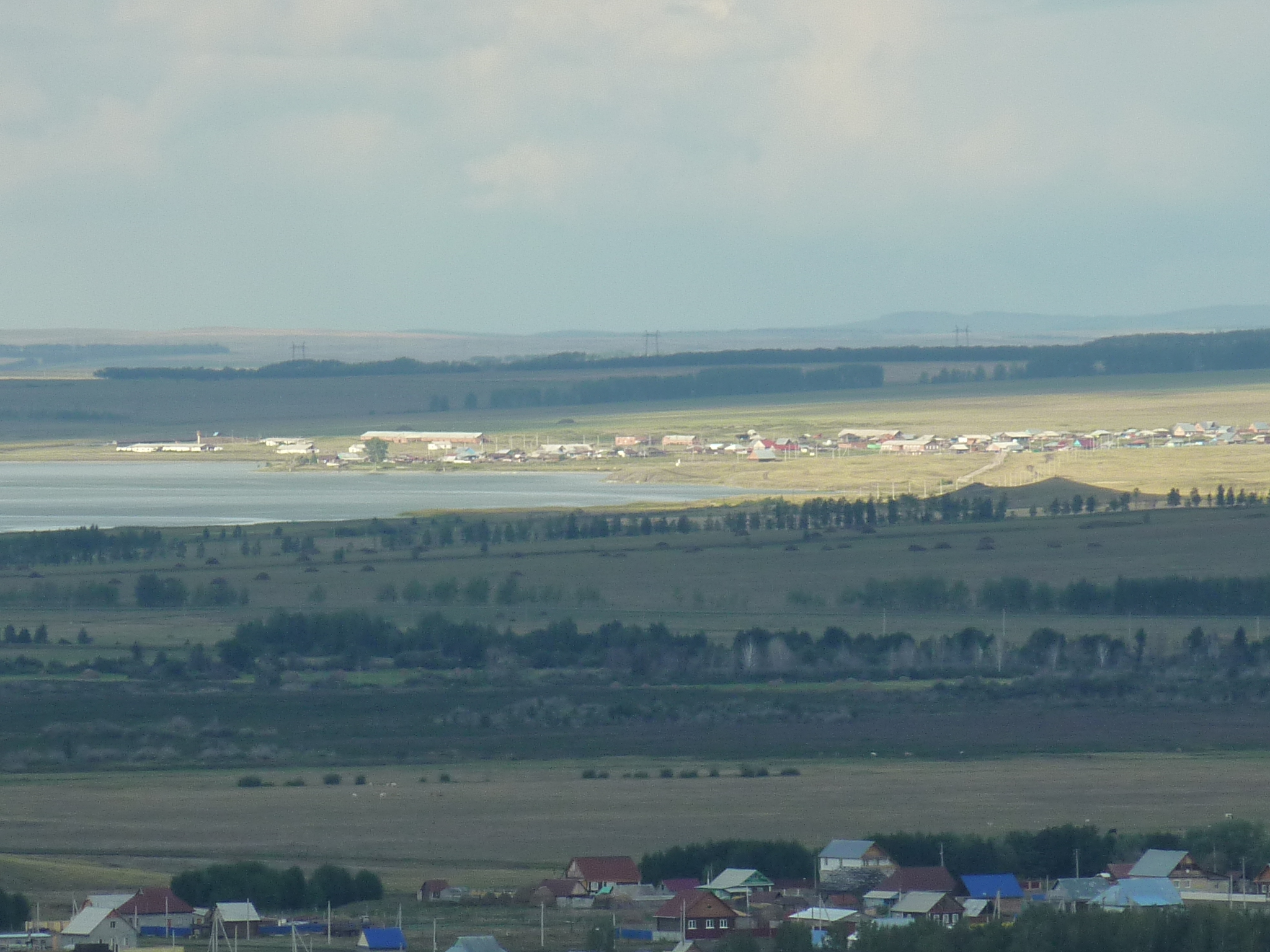

Samarskoye (Russian: Самарское; Bashkir: Һамар, Hamar) is a rural locality (a village) in Tashtimerovsky Selsoviet, Abzelilovsky District, Bashkortostan, Russia. The population was 197 as of 2010. There are 5 streets.

== Geography ==
Samarskoye is located 29 km northeast of Askarovo (the district's administrative centre) by road. Aumyshevo is the nearest rural locality.
