= Razdolnoye, Tambovsky District, Amur Oblast =

Razdolnoye Раздольное
- Selo
- Location within Amur Oblast Location within Russia
- Coordinates: 50°01′N 127°50′E
- Country: Russia
- Region: Amur Oblast
- District: Tambovsky District
- Time zone: UTC+9:00

Razdolnoye (Russian: Раздольное) is a rural locality (a selo) and the administrative center of Razdolnensky Selsoviet of Tambovsky District, Amur Oblast, Russia. The population was 1,750 as of 2018. There are 21 streets.

== Geography ==
Razdolnoye is located 21 km southwest of Tambovka (the district's administrative centre) by road. Roshchino is the nearest rural locality.
