= Samarka, Rubtsovsky District, Altai Krai =

Samarka Самарка
- Selo
- Location within Altai Krai Location within Russia
- Coordinates: 51°22′N 81°15′E
- Country: Russia
- Region: Altai Krai
- District: Rubtsovsky District
- Time zone: UTC+7:00

Samarka (Russian: Самарка) is a rural locality (a selo) and the administrative center of Samarsky Selsoviet, Rubtsovsky District, Altai Krai, Russia. The population was 887 as of 2013. There are 9 streets.

== Geography ==
Samarka is located 18 km south of Rubtsovsk (the district's administrative centre) by road. Polovinkino is the nearest rural locality.
