= Tat-Kuchuk =

Tat-Kuchuk Тат-Кучук
- Village
- Location within Bashkortostan Location within Russia
- Coordinates: 54°48′N 53°52′E
- Country: Russia
- Region: Bashkortostan
- District: Sharansky District
- Time zone: UTC+5:00

Tat-Kuchuk (Russian: Тат-Кучук; Bashkir: Тат-Көсөк, Tat-Kösök) is a rural locality (a village) in Dyurtyulinsky Selsoviet, Sharansky District, Bashkortostan, Russia. The population was 100 as of 2010. There is 1 street.

== Geography ==
Tat-Kuchuk is located 13 km southwest of Sharan (the district's administrative centre) by road. Sarsaz is the nearest rural locality.
