= Razdolnoye, Jewish Autonomous Oblast =

Razdolnoye Раздольное
- Selo
- Location within Jewish Autonomous Oblast Location within Russia
- Coordinates: 48°50′N 132°50′E
- Country: Russia
- Region: Jewish Autonomous Oblast
- District: Birobidzhansky District
- Time zone: UTC+10:00

Razdolnoye (Russian: Раздольное) is a rural locality (a selo) in Birobidzhansky District, Jewish Autonomous Oblast, Russia. Population: 327 (2010 census); 265 (2002 census); There are 36 streets in this selo.

== Geography ==
This rural locality is located 8 km from Birobidzhan (the district's administrative centre and capital of Jewish Autonomous Oblast) and 7,011 km from Moscow. Kirga is the nearest rural locality.
