= Razdolnoye, Volgograd Oblast =

Razdolnoye Раздольное
- Selo
- Location within Volgograd Oblast Location within Russia
- Coordinates: 49°54′N 46°03′E
- Country: Russia
- Region: Volgograd Oblast
- District: Nikolayevsky District
- Time zone: UTC+4:00

Razdolnoye (Russian: Раздольное) is a rural locality (a selo) and the administrative center of Sovkhozskoye Rural Settlement, Nikolayevsky District, Volgograd Oblast, Russia. The population was 1,451 as of 2010. There are 18 streets.

== Geography ==
Razdolnoye is located in steppe of the Transvolga, 59 km southeast of Nikolayevsk (the district's administrative centre) by road. Kumysolechebnitsa is the nearest rural locality.
