= Nizhny Kuchuk =

Nizhny Kuchuk Нижний Кучук
- Village
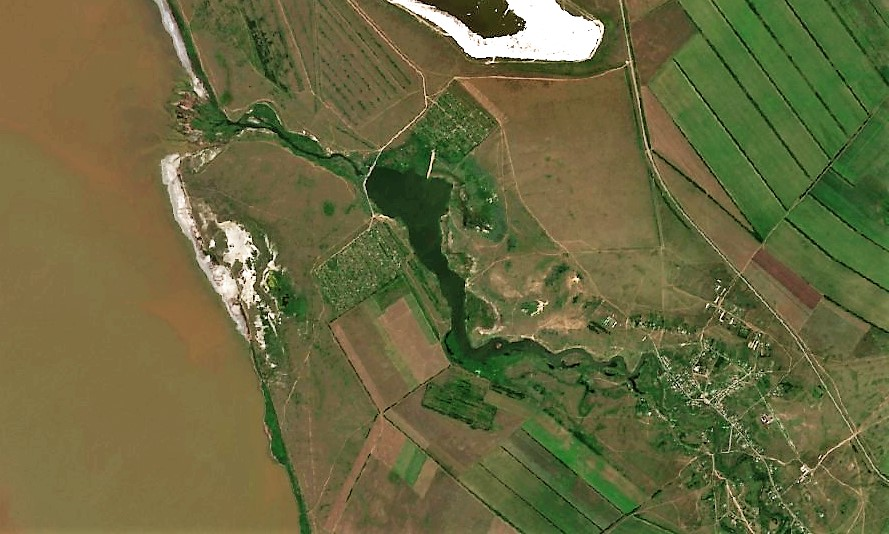
- Nizhny Kuchuk village in the lower right

- Location within Altai Krai Location within Russia
- Coordinates: 52°42′N 79°56′E
- Country: Russia
- Region: Altai Krai
- District: Blagoveshchensky District
- Time zone: UTC+7:00

Nizhny Kuchuk (Russian: Нижний Кучук) is a rural locality (a selo) and the administrative center of Nizhnekuchuksky Selsoviet of Blagoveshchensky District, Altai Krai, Russia. The population was 464 as of 2016. There are 6 streets.

== Geography ==
Nizhny Kuchuk is located east of Lake Kuchuk, by the Kuchuk River, 18 km south of Blagoveshchenka (the district's administrative centre) by road. Stepnoye Ozero is the nearest rural locality.

== Ethnicity ==
The village is inhabited by Russians, as well as other ethnic groups.
