= Razdolny, Astrakhan Oblast =

Razdolny Раздольный
- Khutor
- Location within Astrakhan Oblast Location within Russia
- Coordinates: 48°23′N 45°34′E
- Country: Russia
- Region: Astrakhan Oblast
- District: Chernoyarsky District
- Time zone: UTC+4:00

Razdolny (Russian: Раздольный) is a rural locality (a khutor) in Kamennoyarsky Selsoviet, Chernoyarsky District, Astrakhan Oblast, Russia. The population was 12 as of 2010.

== Geography ==
Razdolny is located on the Volga River, 67 km northwest of Chyorny Yar (the district's administrative centre) by road. Kamenny Yar is the nearest rural locality.
