= Razdolny, Volgograd Oblast =

Razdolny Раздольный
- Settlement
- Location within Volgograd Oblast Location within Russia
- Coordinates: 48°08′N 42°08′E
- Country: Russia
- Region: Volgograd Oblast
- District: Chernyshkovsky District
- Time zone: UTC+4:00

Razdolny (Russian: Раздольный) is a rural locality (a settlement) in Basakinskoye Rural Settlement, Chernyshkovsky District, Volgograd Oblast, Russia. The population was 17 as of 2010. There are 2 streets.

== Geography ==
Razdolny is located 44 km southwest of Chernyshkovsky (the district's administrative centre) by road. Rossoshansky is the nearest rural locality.
