= Rodino, Shipunovsky District, Altai Krai =

Rodino Родино
- Selo
- Location within Altai Krai Location within Russia
- Coordinates: 52°22′N 81°59′E
- Country: Russia
- Region: Altai Krai
- District: Shipunovsky District
- Time zone: UTC+7:00

Rodino (Russian: Родино) is a rural locality (a selo) and the administrative center of Rodinsky Selsoviet, Shipunovsky District, Altai Krai, Russia. The population was 1,253 as of 2013. There are 18 streets.

== Geography ==
Rodino is located 27 km northwest of Shipunovo (the district's administrative centre) by road. Novoivanovka is the nearest rural locality.
