= Razdolny, Voronezh Oblast =

Razdolny Раздольный
- Khutor
- Location within Voronezh Oblast Location within Russia
- Coordinates: 51°08′N 39°48′E
- Country: Russia
- Region: Voronezh Oblast
- District: Bobrovsky District
- Time zone: UTC+3:00

Razdolny (Russian: Раздольный) is a rural locality (a khutor) in Nikolskoye Rural Settlement, Bobrovsky District, Voronezh Oblast, Russia. The population was 71 as of 2010.

== Geography ==
Razdolny is located 23 km northwest of Bobrov (the district's administrative centre) by road. Nikolskoye 2-ye is the nearest rural locality.
