= Samarskoye, Khaybullinsky District, Republic of Bashkortostan =

Samarskoye Самарское
- Selo
- Location within Bashkortostan Location within Russia
- Coordinates: 52°01′N 58°09′E
- Country: Russia
- Region: Bashkortostan
- District: Khaybullinsky District
- Time zone: UTC+5:00

Samarskoye (Russian: Самарское; Bashkir: Һамар, Hamar) is a rural locality (a selo) and the administrative centre of Samarsky Selsoviet, Khaybullinsky District, Bashkortostan, Russia. The population was 877 as of 2010. There are 10 streets.

== Geography ==
Samarskoye is located 21 km north of Akyar (the district's administrative centre) by road. Buribay is the nearest rural locality.
