= Tyumentsevo =

Tyumentsevo Тюменцево
- Village
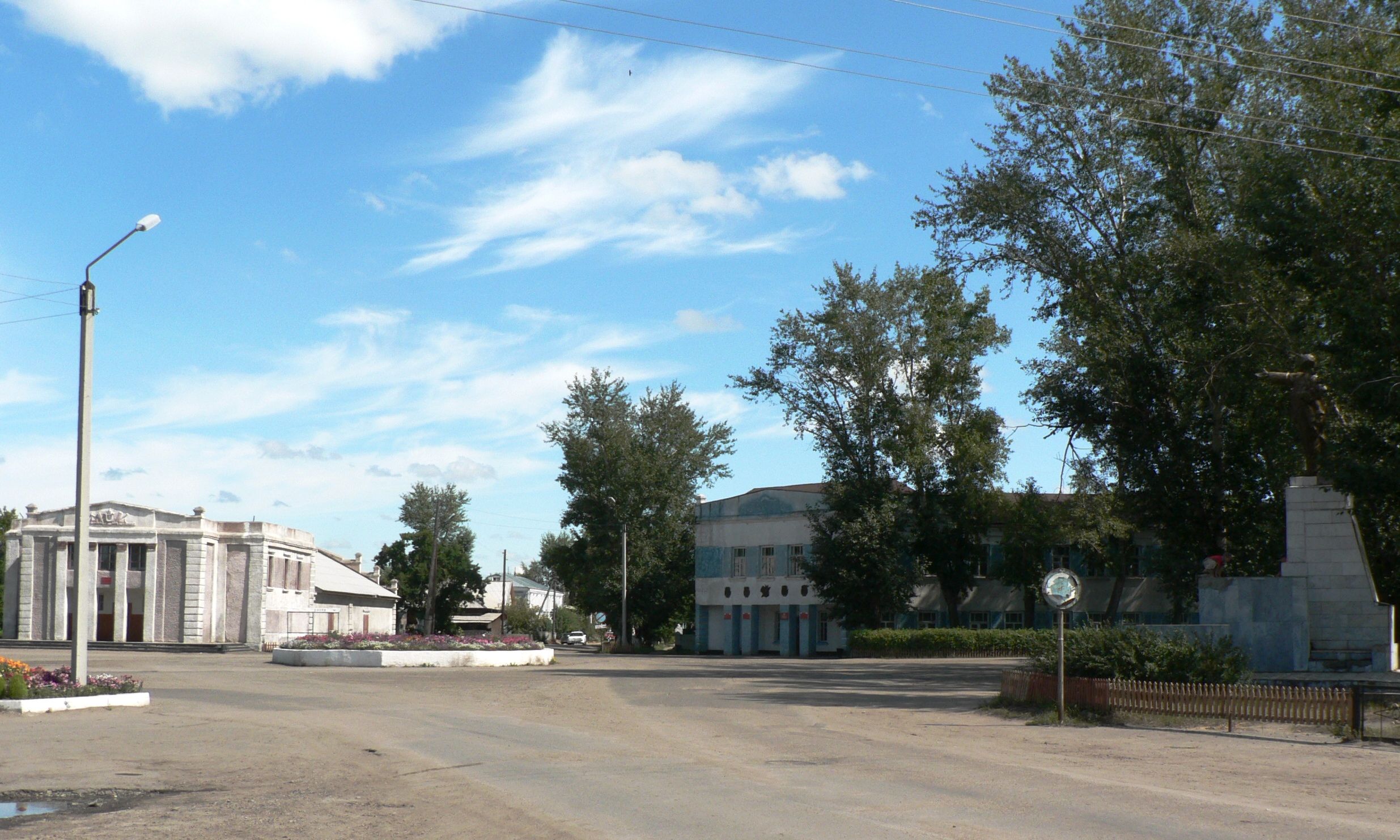

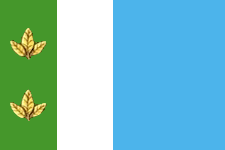
- Flag

- Location within Altai Krai Location within Russia
- Coordinates: 53°19′N 81°30′E
- Country: Russia
- Region: Altai Krai
- District: Tyumentsevsky District
- Time zone: UTC+7:00

Tyumentsevo (Russian: Тюменцево) is a rural locality (a selo) and the administrative center of Tyumentsevsky District, Altai Krai, Russia. The population was 5,255 in 2016. There are 45 streets.

== Geography ==
The village is located in the forest-steppe zone of the West Siberian Plain at the confluence of the Cheremshanka and Medvedka Rivers.
