= Tyumentsevsky District =

Tyumentsevsky District Тюменцевский район (Russian)
- District
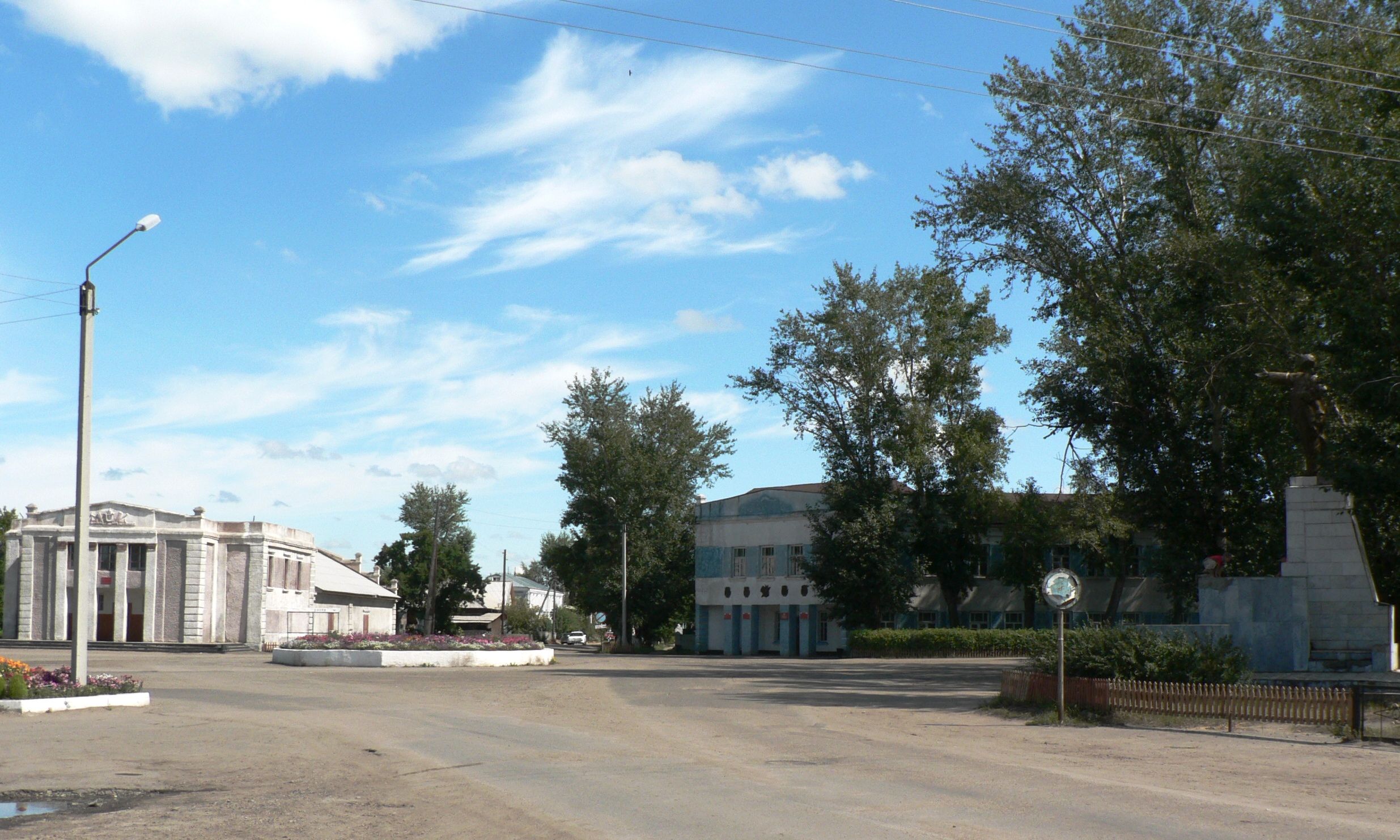
- Tyumentsevo, Tyumentsevsky District

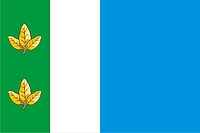
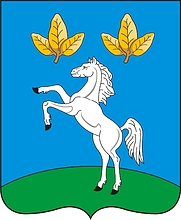
- Flag Coat of arms
- Location of Tyumentsevsky District in Altai Krai
- Coordinates: 53°18′N 81°30′E
- Country: Russia
- Federal subject: Altai Krai
- Established: 12 September 1924
- Administrative center: Tyumentsevo

Area
  - Total: 2,273 km^{2} (878 sq mi)

Population (2010 Census)
  - Total: 15,695
  - Density: 6.905/km^{2} (17.88/sq mi)
  - Urban: 0%
  - Rural: 100%

Administrative structure
  - Administrative divisions: 14 selsoviet
  - Inhabited localities: 20 rural localities

Municipal structure
  - Municipally incorporated as: Tyumentsevsky Municipal District
  - Municipal divisions: 0 urban settlements, 14 rural settlements
- Time zone: UTC+7 (MSK+4)
- OKTMO ID: 01652000
- Website: http://tumencevo.ucoz.ru/

Tyumentsevsky District (Russian: Тюме́нцевский райо́н) is an administrative and municipal district (raion), one of the fifty-nine in Altai Krai, Russia. The area of the district is 2,273 square kilometers (878 sq mi). Its administrative center is the rural locality (a selo) of Tyumentsevo. Population: 15,695 (2010 census); 17,985 (2002 census); 17,616 (1989 Soviet census). The population of Tyumentsevo accounts for 35.5% of the district's total population.

== Geography ==
The district is located in the north of the krai, in the area of the Ob Plateau. Lake Gorkoye is located in the district and the Kulunda Main Canal runs along its eastern side.
