= Shelabolikha =

Shelabolikha Шелаболиха
- Village
- Location within Altai Krai Location within Russia
- Coordinates: 53°24′N 82°36′E
- Country: Russia
- Region: Altai Krai
- District: Shelabolikhinsky District
- Time zone: UTC+7:00

Shelabolikha (Russian: Шелаболиха) is a rural locality (a selo) and the administrative center of Shelabolikhinsky Selsoviet and Shelabolikhinsky District, Altai Krai, Russia. The population was 3,780 in 2016. There are 49 streets.

== Geography ==
The village is located 86 km west from Barnaul on the Ob River.
