= Rodino, Rodinsky District, Altai Krai =

Rural locality in Altai Krai, Russia

Rodino Родино
- Selo
- Location within Altai Krai Location within Russia
- Coordinates: 52°30′N 80°12′E
- Country: Russia
- Region: Altai Krai
- District: Rodinsky District
- Time zone: UTC+7:00

Rodino (Russian: Родино) is a rural locality (a selo) and the administrative center of Rodinsky District of Altai Krai, Russia. Population: 8,597 (2010 census); 9,496 (2002 census); 8,944 (1989 Soviet census).

== Geography ==
Rodino is located in the Kulunda Plain, 30 kilometers (19 mi) to the southeast of Lake Kuchuk.
