= Shelabolikhinsky District =

Shelabolikhinsky District Шелаболихинский район (Russian)
- District
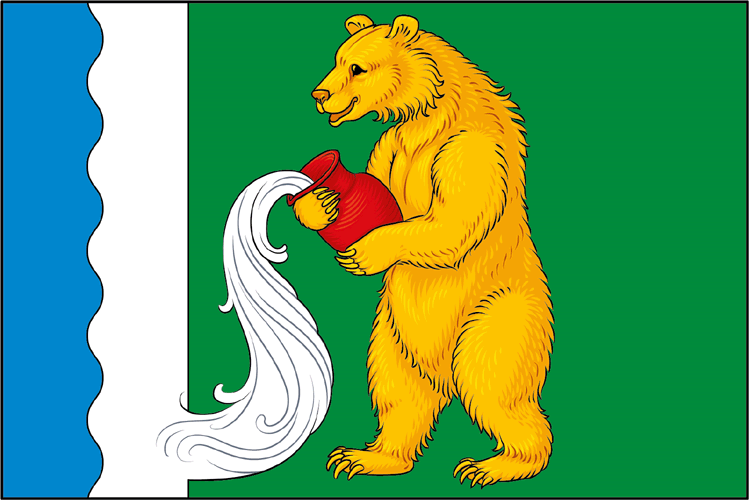
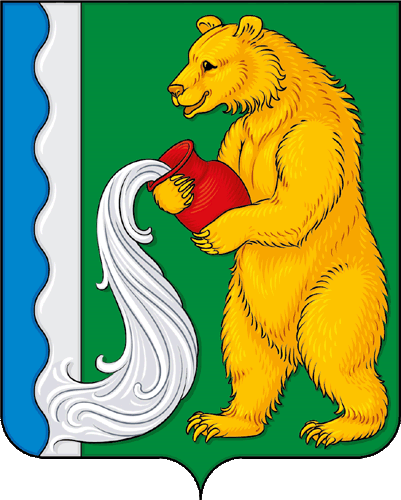
- Flag Coat of arms
- Location of Shelabolikhinsky District in Altai Krai
- Coordinates: 53°25′N 82°37′E
- Country: Russia
- Federal subject: Altai Krai
- Administrative center: Shelabolikha

Area
  - Total: 2,510 km^{2} (970 sq mi)

Population (2010 Census)
  - Total: 13,678
  - Density: 5.45/km^{2} (14.1/sq mi)
  - Urban: 0%
  - Rural: 100%

Administrative structure
  - Administrative divisions: 10 selsoviet
  - Inhabited localities: 21 rural localities

Municipal structure
  - Municipally incorporated as: Shelabolikhinsky Municipal District
  - Municipal divisions: 0 urban settlements, 10 rural settlements
- Time zone: UTC+7 (MSK+4)
- OKTMO ID: 01645000
- Website: http://xn--80aacorpcx9dwa.xn--p1ai/

Shelabolikhinsky District (Russian: Шелабо́лихинский райо́н) is an administrative and municipal district (raion), one of the fifty-nine in Altai Krai, Russia. It is located in the north of the krai. The area of the district is 2,510 square kilometers (970 sq mi). Its administrative center is the rural locality (a selo) of Shelabolikha. Population: 13,678 (2010 census); 15,818 (2002 census); 15,535 (1989 Soviet census). The population of Shelabolikha accounts for 29.3% of the district's total population.
