= Rodinsky District =

Rodinsky District Родинский район (Russian)
- District
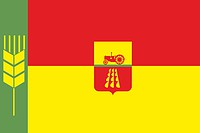
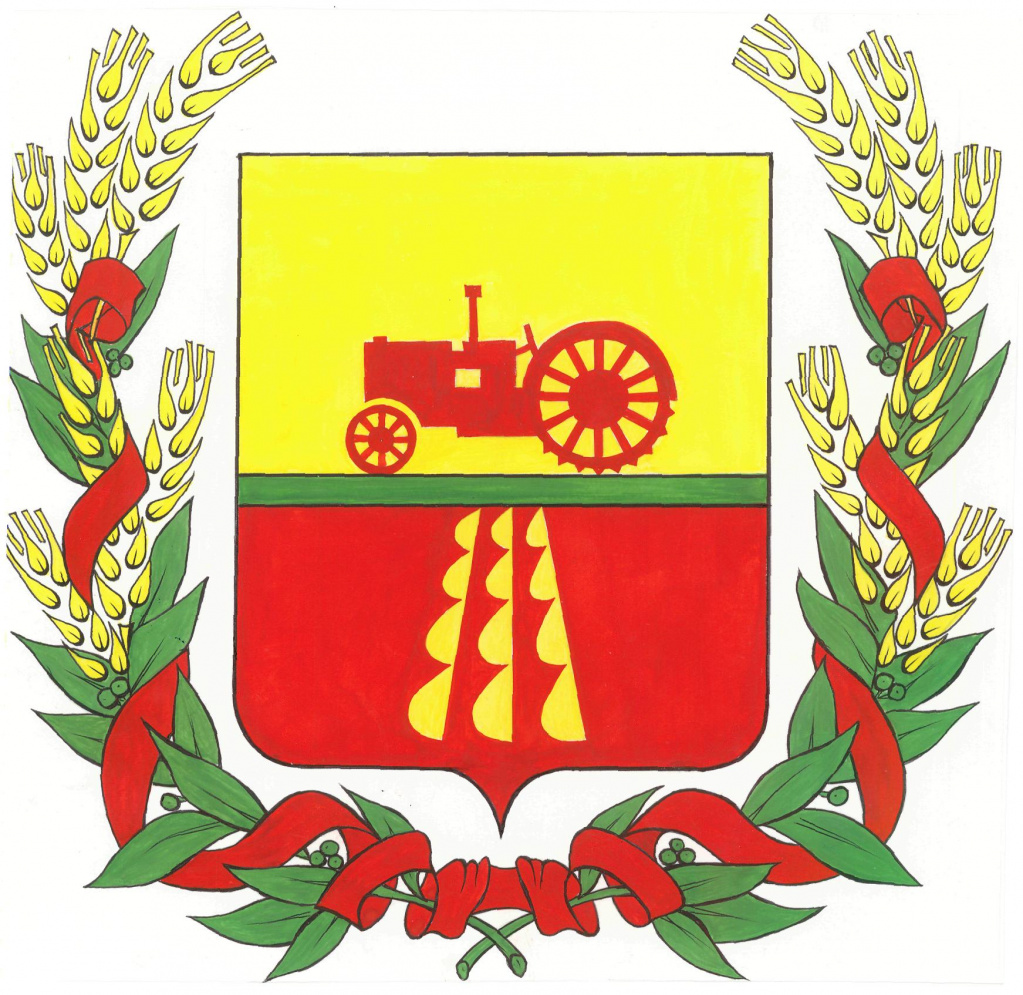
- Flag Coat of arms
- Location of Rodinsky District in Altai Krai
- Coordinates: 52°30′N 80°14′E
- Country: Russia
- Federal subject: Altai Krai
- Established: 1924
- Administrative center: Rodino

Area
  - Total: 3,118 km^{2} (1,204 sq mi)

Population (2010 Census)
  - Total: 20,719
  - Density: 6.645/km^{2} (17.21/sq mi)
  - Urban: 0%
  - Rural: 100%

Administrative structure
  - Administrative divisions: 12 selsoviet
  - Inhabited localities: 20 rural localities

Municipal structure
  - Municipally incorporated as: Rodinsky Municipal District
  - Municipal divisions: 0 urban settlements, 12 rural settlements
- Time zone: UTC+7 (MSK+4)
- OKTMO ID: 01636000
- Website: http://rodino22.ru/

Rodinsky District (Russian: Ро́динский райо́н) is an administrative and municipal district (raion), one of the fifty-nine in Altai Krai, Russia. It is located in the west of the krai. The area of the district is 3,118 square kilometers (1,204 sq mi). Its administrative center is the rural locality (a selo) of Rodino. Population: 20,719 (2010 census); 25,482 (2002 census); 24,966 (1989 Soviet census). The population of Rodino accounts for 41.5% of the district's total population.

== Geography ==
Rodinsky District is located in the western sector of the krai, in the area where the Ob Plateau transitions to the Kulunda Steppe. The last stretch of the Kulunda Main Canal is located in the district.
