= Kamen-na-Obi =

Town in Altai Krai, Russia

Kamen-na-Obi Камень-на-Оби
- Town
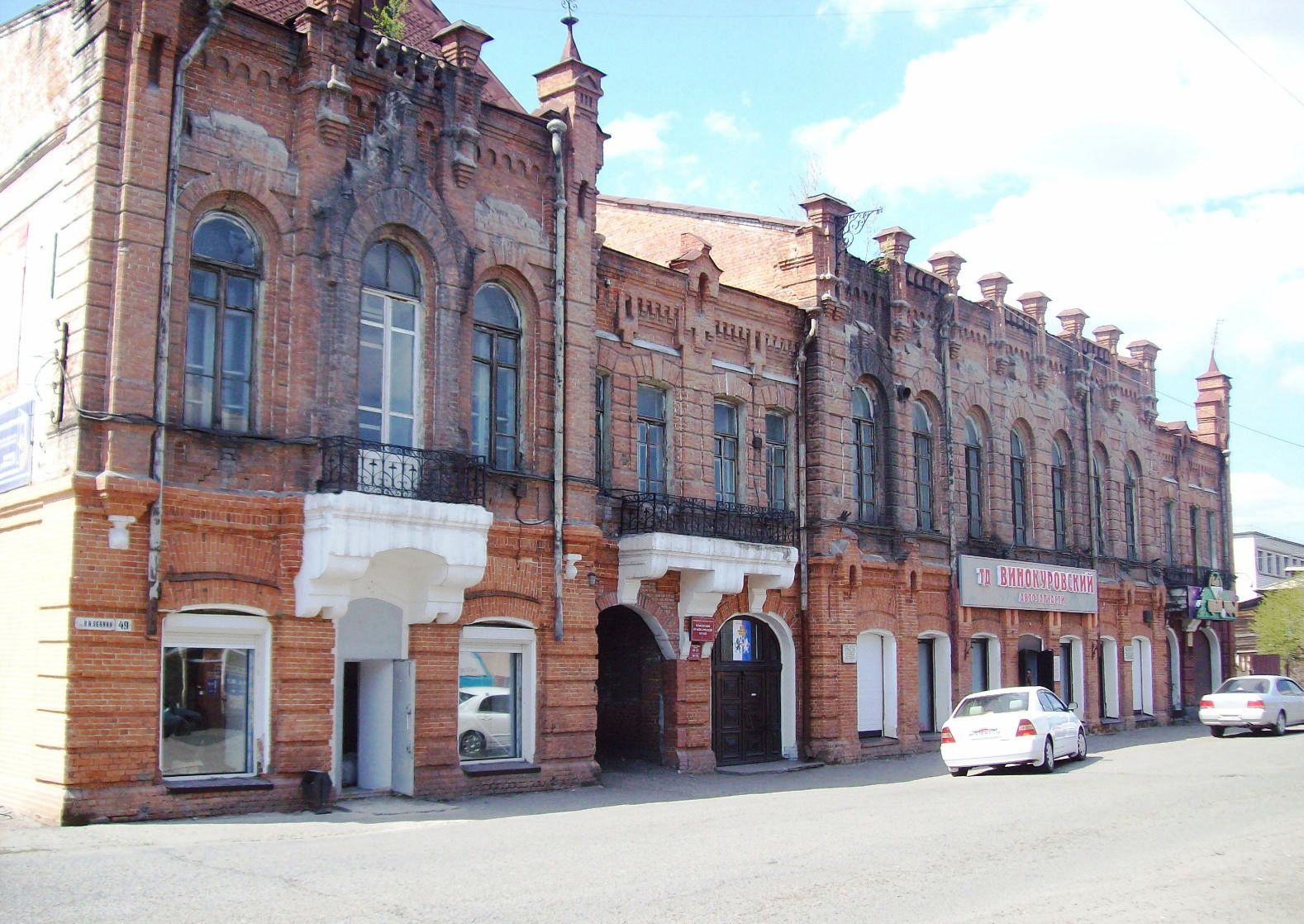
- A historical building in Kamen-na-Obi

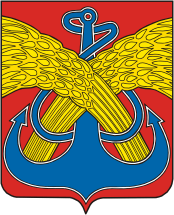
- Coat of arms
- Interactive map of Kamen-na-Obi
- Location of Kamen-na-Obi Kamen-na-Obi (Altai Krai)
- Coordinates: 53°47′N 81°20′E
- Country: Russia
- Federal subject: Altai Krai
- Administrative district: Kamensky District
- Town of district significanceSelsoviet: Kamen-na-Obi
- Founded: 1751
- Town status since: 1915
- Elevation: 120 m (390 ft)

Population (2010 Census)
  - Total: 43,888
  - Estimate (2021): 32,385 (−26.2%)

Administrative status
  - Capital of: Kamensky District, town of district significance of Kamen-na-Obi

Municipal status
  - Municipal district: Kamensky Municipal District
  - Urban settlement: Kamen-na-Obi Urban Settlement
  - Capital of: Kamensky Municipal District, Kamen-na-Obi Urban Settlement
- Time zone: UTC+7 (MSK+4)
- Postal codes: 658700, 658701, 658703–658707, 658709, 658739
- OKTMO ID: 01616101001

Kamen-na-Obi population
- 2010 Census: 43,888
- 2002 Census: 44,375
- 1989 Census: 42,483
- 1979 Census: 40,018

Kamen-na-Obi (Russian: Ка́мень-на-Оби́), known until 1933 as Kamen (Ка́мень), is a town in Altai Krai, Russia, located on the left bank of the Ob River 208 kilometers (129 mi) northwest of Barnaul, the administrative center of the krai. As of the 2010 Census, its population was 43,888.

== History ==
=== Pre-revolutionary period ===
The founding date of the settlement is considered to be 1751. Previously, the founding date was considered to be 1670, however, in 2000, a scientific study was carried out, during which it turned out that the founding date of the village of Kamen is 1751. The name has a literal explanation: the village was named so because of the rocky outcrop of a spur of the Salair Ridge on the surface of the earth near it.

On a detailed map of the Kolyvan-Voznesensk mountain district in 1816, the village is called Kamenka.

On the General Map of Western Siberia in 1848, the village is labeled Kamenka (Buksilova).

On the map of Tomsk province in Ilyin's atlas (1871) the village is called Kuksilovo.

On the map Map of provinces and regions of the Russian Empire along the Siberian Railway (1893) the village is called Katelnarskaya (Kamen).

Since 1886, it has been classified as a village. It was formed by the merger of several smaller settlements located in the neighborhood.

The favorable geographical location and the presence of a pier determined the economic development of the village. By the end of the 19th century, the village of Kamen was a large trading village in the Barnaul Uezd of the Tomsk Governorate and became (until 1925) the center of the Kamensk volost. Local merchants established economic trade ties with Russian and European enterprises. The main commodity sold at that time was grain. The largest suppliers of wheat were local merchants Vinokurov and Falkov. In 1912, in terms of trade turnover, the village of Kamen ranked 4th in the Tomsk Governorate, after Tomsk, Novonikolaevsk (now Novosibirsk) and Barnaul. There was also a handicraft industry in the city and county: tanneries, oil churns, mills and other small enterprises for processing agricultural raw materials. In the district there were about 200 butter-making artels, many private butter factories and grain storage centers. The labor force, represented by landless peasant migrants from Central Russia, was unusually cheap.

After the construction of the Trans-Siberian Railway in Novonikolaevsk (now Novosibirsk), the importance of water transport decreased and the economic role of the village in the region began to gradually fade away. However, railway transport did not develop so quickly and the village remained a major grain transshipment point. On May 10 (23), 1915, the village of Kamen was given the status of a city; by 1917 there were 15 thousand inhabitants.

=== Kamen during the October Revolution ===
A feature of the political development of the city in 1917 was the hegemony of the Bolsheviks, who were among the first in Siberia to form a party organization separate from the Mensheviks and took power in the city peacefully. Power passed to the Soviets at the end of December 1917. The executive committee of the Council adopted the name "District Council of People's Commissars". Ignatiy Vladimirovich Gromov (Mamonov) was elected chairman of the Kamensky District Soviet. After the establishment of Soviet power, the People's House was opened in the city, clubs were opened in the volost villages, and reading huts were opened in the villages. The council nationalized several houses of large landlords and turned them over to schools. To finance public education, as well as the fight against counter-revolution, an indemnity in the amount of 3 million rubles was imposed on the local bourgeoisie (of which they managed to collect about 2 million).

At the suggestion of the anarchists elected to the council, the issue of creating the Kamensk district federal republic was discussed. Local anarchists wanted to achieve independence from the province so as not to supply food to the center.

In February – March 1918, a counter-revolutionary rebellion broke out in Kamen and its district, led by the head of the district police, former lieutenant Samoilov. The rebels killed Bolsheviks, Soviet activists, and destroyed Soviet institutions. Red Guard detachments from Barnaul and Novonikolaevsk arrived to eliminate the rebellion. The Barnaul detachment of Red Guard railwaymen, numbering up to 150 bayonets, was led by I. M. Tsaritsyn and M. A. Fomin. As a result, the rebellion was suppressed, moreover, Soviets appeared in those villages of the district where they had not previously existed.

By May 1918, Kamen's Red Guard detachment numbered about 300 fighters, but its main forces were sent to Transbaikalia to fight against the gangs of Ataman Semyonov. By the time of the White Czech uprising, the Kamensk Bolsheviks were practically unarmed. On June 9, 1918, the city was taken without a fight by the White Guards, who arrived by boat from Novonikolaevsk. 8 Bolsheviks remained in the city to conduct underground work.

In August 1919, Kamen became a frontline city. A peasant uprising began in the village of Ust-Mosikha, organized by a local teacher, Bolshevik A. N. Danilov. On August 29, 1919, the partisan detachment of Ignatius Gromov occupied the city for several hours. This action pursued not so much military as political goals: to show the increased power of pro-Bolshevik partisans. In the afternoon, the Whites returned to the city, supported by one and a half thousand Poles, with two steamships, two cannons and machine guns. The Red partisans and peasants retreated, capturing 400 rifles and looting warehouses with ammunition, uniforms, textiles and leather goods. The Reds freed about five hundred captured Hungarians, from whom a company of Red Magyars was formed under the command of Max Lamberg.

Soviet power in the city was restored on November 28, 1919, by partisan detachments and units of the regular Red Army that occupied Kamen.

=== Soviet period and the present ===
In 1930, according to the project and under the leadership of Yuri Kondratyuk, a unique structure named "Mastodon" was built – the largest wooden granary in the world with a capacity of 13,000 tons. This structure was built without a single nail. In the mid-1990s, Mastodon was seriously damaged during a major fire and was subsequently destroyed.

Since April 10, 1933, the city has had its modern name – Kamen-na-Obi.

During the years 1939 to 1941, Jews and others from Lithuania were arrested and forcibly taken to Kamen-na-Obi during the "Lietuvos Gyventoju Genocidas," the Genocide of the Lithuanian People.

During World War II, some enterprises and institutions were evacuated to Kamen-on-Ob: in particular, the Voronezh Agricultural Institute and the Altai State Pedagogical University.

In the post-war years, Kamen-na-Obi developed as an agricultural center in the region. Thus, in the early 1960s, the Central Siberian Mainline of the West Siberian Railway was put into operation, which made it possible to establish stable transport links with major cities of Siberia. From 1973 to 1983, the Kulunda Main Canal was built, designed to irrigate agricultural lands in the arid steppe of Altai Krai. In 1977, the head pumping station and the head section, starting in Kamen-na-Obi, were put into operation. In 1979, construction of the largest grain elevator beyond the Urals was completed.

Until 2015 it was a city of regional significance; since then it has been a city of district significance.

== Administrative and municipal status ==
Within the framework of administrative divisions, Kamen-na-Obi serves as the administrative center of Kamensky District. As an administrative division, it is, together with one rural locality (the station of Plotinnaya), incorporated within Kamensky District as the town of district significance of Kamen-na-Obi. As a municipal division, the town of district significance of Kamen-na-Obi is incorporated within Kamensky Municipal District as Kamen-na-Obi Urban Settlement.

As an administrative division, prior to September 2015 Kamen-na-Obi and Plotinnaya were incorporated separately into the town of krai significance of Kamen-na-Obi—an administrative unit with the status equal to that of the districts. As a municipal division, the town of krai significance of Kamen-na-Obi was incorporated as Kamen-na-Obi Urban Okrug. The status of both units was changed in September 2015, when the town of krai significance was demoted to a town of district significance and subordinated to Kamensky District, while the urban okrug was demoted to an urban settlement within Kamensky Municipal District.

== Economy ==
=== Industry ===
Kamen-na-Obi has a very developed trade and food industry, and other industries are also represented in small numbers.

The main enterprises in the town are a metal plant, a Voskhod meat processing plant, a butter and cheese factory, a fish factory, a poultry farm, a grain elevator, a furniture factory, and an enterprise for the production of deep-frozen products.

In 2011, one of the largest woodworking plants in the Siberian region, the Kamensky Timber and Wood Processing Plant, was launched. The processing capacity of the plant is 1000 cubic meters of wood per day. The volume of wood processing at Kamenskoye LDK is 220–240 thousand m^{3} per year.

=== Transport ===
The city has rail, road and river transport.

The Central Siberian Mainline of the West Siberian Railway passes through the Kamen-na-Obi railway station. With the commissioning of the second bridgeа across the Ob on September 25, 2009, the Central Siberian Railway became the main freight route of the West Siberian Railway. Long-distance passenger trains to Moscow, Omsk and Rubtsovsk and commuter trains to Karasuk, Barnaul and Plotinnaya run through the Kamen-na-Obi station.

Public transport is represented by intercity, suburban and city bus transportation. From the Kamen bus station, buses depart to Novosibirsk, Barnaul, Rubtsovsk, Slavgorod, Bayevo, Tyumentsevo, Zavyalovo and other settlements of the region. Suburban passenger transportation is carried out in the villages of Kamensky and Krutikhinsky districts. The urban transport route network consists of eight bus routes. The regional highway P380 Novosibirsk – Kamen-na-Obi – Barnaul passes through the city.

River transport is represented by passenger transportation (2 suburban routes) and freight transportation (barge transportation of sand, crushed stone, etc.).

There is a military airfield 9 km west of the city. Until the mid-1990s, the 96th training aviation regiment of the Barnaul VVAUL was based at the airfield. Currently, the airfield is mothballed. The airfield accepts civil aircraft (medical and agricultural aviation).

Main highways of the city:

- Barnaulskiy Trakt (to Barnaul on highway P380),
- Kamenskaya Street (to Novosibirsk on highway P380),
- Novoyarkovsky Trakt (to Bayevo, Zavyalovo),

as well as inner city streets such as Kolesnikova, Pushkina, Leningradskaya and Gogol streets as well as others.

== Geography ==
=== Climate ===
Kamen-na-Obi has a cold and temperate climate. High rainfall, even in the dry months. According to the Köppen climate classification, it lies in a humid continental climate (Dfb index) with uniform humidity and warm summers.

The continental climate of Kamen-na-Obi is determined by its unique geographical location in southwestern Siberia. Openness to the influence simultaneously from the Altai Mountains, the Arctic Ocean and the semi-desert regions of Central Asia creates the possibility of the arrival of air masses of different properties, which contributes to a significant contrast in weather conditions. Kamen-na-Obi is characterized by frosty, moderately severe and little snow winters and warm, dry summers.

The coldest month of the year is January (average temperature −17 °C), while the warmest is July (+20 °C). Relative humidity in the cold period of the year varies between 71% and 89%, and in the warm period it is about 58%. The average annual precipitation is 381 mm.

Climate data for Kamen-na-Obi (extremes 1936–present)
Month	Jan	Feb	Mar	Apr	May	Jun	Jul	Aug	Sep	Oct	Nov	Dec	Year
Record high °C (°F)	4.5 (40.1)	4.9 (40.8)	16.0 (60.8)	32.5 (90.5)	36.6 (97.9)	39.3 (102.7)	39.3 (102.7)	37.5 (99.5)	35.6 (96.1)	26.2 (79.2)	15.0 (59.0)	4.6 (40.3)	39.3 (102.7)
Mean daily maximum °C (°F)	−12.8 (9.0)	−9.5 (14.9)	−1.5 (29.3)	11.6 (52.9)	20.6 (69.1)	25.1 (77.2)	26.7 (80.1)	24.9 (76.8)	17.8 (64.0)	9.3 (48.7)	−2.7 (27.1)	−9.7 (14.5)	8.3 (47.0)
Daily mean °C (°F)	−17.9 (−0.2)	−15.5 (4.1)	−7.5 (18.5)	4.6 (40.3)	12.7 (54.9)	18.2 (64.8)	20.0 (68.0)	17.5 (63.5)	10.7 (51.3)	3.4 (38.1)	−6.9 (19.6)	−14.3 (6.3)	2.1 (35.8)
Mean daily minimum °C (°F)	−22.5 (−8.5)	−20.5 (−4.9)	−12.7 (9.1)	−1.1 (30.0)	5.6 (42.1)	11.3 (52.3)	13.6 (56.5)	10.8 (51.4)	4.8 (40.6)	−1.0 (30.2)	−10.5 (13.1)	−18.6 (−1.5)	−3.4 (25.9)
Record low °C (°F)	−52.5 (−62.5)	−46.8 (−52.2)	−41.0 (−41.8)	−30.0 (−22.0)	−10.5 (13.1)	−2.6 (27.3)	2.3 (36.1)	−1.5 (29.3)	−8.5 (16.7)	−23.9 (−11.0)	−45.2 (−49.4)	−46.6 (−51.9)	−52.5 (−62.5)
Average precipitation mm (inches)	16.0 (0.63)	14.6 (0.57)	14.6 (0.57)	18.2 (0.72)	30.8 (1.21)	43.1 (1.70)	62.7 (2.47)	37.8 (1.49)	35.2 (1.39)	25.5 (1.00)	25.3 (1.00)	22.9 (0.90)	346.7 (13.65)
Source: pogoda.ru.net

== Social sphere ==
The city has educational, healthcare and cultural institutions, and there are bank branches, including Sberbank.

=== Education ===
Among the educational institutions there are 7 secondary schools (including 2 lyceums, 1 gymnasium), a secondary vocational educational institution, 3 secondary specialized educational institutions (Kamenska Pedagogical College, Kamensk Medical College, Kamensk Agrarian College). There are also branches of some universities in Barnaul and Novosibirsk. There are institutions of additional education (3 music schools, a sports school, an environmental and biological station, a young technician station, a children's creativity center, etc.).

=== Healthcare ===
Health care institutions in the city are represented by the Kamensk Central District Hospital, Regional Psychiatric Hospital No. 2, clinics, and an anti-tuberculosis dispensary. There are several private dental offices in the city.

=== Culture ===
The city has a city library and its branches, cultural centers, a recreation park, and a local history museum, which was created in 1920.

== Attractions ==
The main attractions are located on Lenin Street (formerly Main Street), which runs parallel to the Ob River for more than 3 km from Bazarnaya Square (currently home to the Spartak stadium) to the port facilities.

At the beginning of the street on a hill is the Epiphany Church (consecrated in 1902). The construction and arrangement of a stone church on the site of a dilapidated wooden one was carried out with donations from merchants Vinokurov, Zorin, Pudovkin, Simonin and Chaigin. The temple was based on an exemplary design in the Russian Revival architectural style, with elements of ancient Russian religious architecture. In the 1930s, the crosses were removed from the temple, and a distillery was located inside. Archived from the original on September 17, 2013. Currently, the plant's facilities have been transferred to another building – the temple building is being restored.

In the building of the mansion of the merchant A.S. Khomutov (Lenin St., 18), next to the church, there was a medical school until 2007. This is a two-story brick house with a basement. The façade is decorated with white brick ornaments. The building is made in an Eclectic style using elements of classicism. In connection with the start of construction in 2006 of the second railway bridge across the Ob, the school moved to a new building on Pushkin Street.

At house number 49 on Lenin Street there is the Kamensk State Museum of Local Lore. The city museum is located in the neoclassical mansion of the Vinokurov merchants ("Vinokurovsky House"). In 1942–1944. the building housed the evacuated Voronezh Agricultural Institute. Since May 2008, the Vinokurov and Sons trading house has been protected by the state as an architectural monument of federal significance.

On the corner of Lenin Street (No. 66) and Komsomolskaya there is a beautiful two-story brick house of the merchant Pudovkin with a rounded corner shape. Its architecture contains elements of early century Art Nouveau. On the second floor there are twisted wrought iron balconies and decorative elements. At the address st. Lenina, 78 is the main building of the estate of the merchant Zorin (now the Office of the Pension Fund of the Russian Federation for Kamen-na-Obi and Kamensky District), also built in the eclectic style of the early 20th century. It is also a two-story brick building with a cubic shape. On the second floor of the central facade there is a beautiful wrought-iron balcony; the windows are decorated with white brick ornaments.

Among the modern attractions, one can note the embankment, stretching along the river bank from Krasnoarmeyskaya Street to the city park.

== Notable people ==
Ivan Pyryev, (November 4 (17), 1901 – February 7, 1968) – Soviet film director, screenwriter, actor, teacher, public figure, People's Artist of the USSR (1948), laureate of six Stalin Prizes (1941, 1942, 1943, 1946, 1948, 1951). Knight of three orders of Lenin (1938, 1948, 1967)
