= Kamensky District, Altai Krai =

Kamensky District Каменский район (Russian)
- District
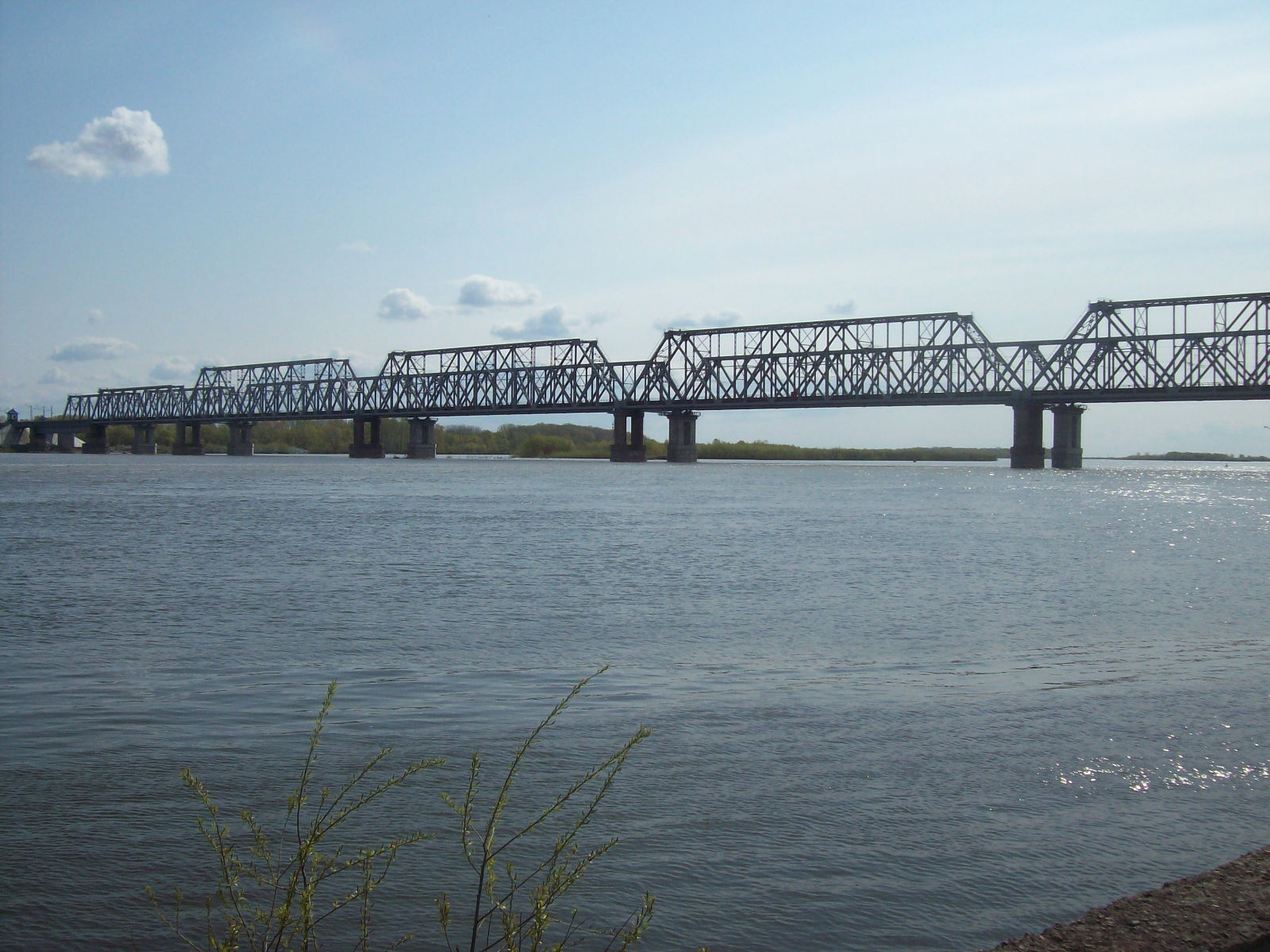
- Bridge over the Ob River in Kamen-na-Obi, the administrative center of the district

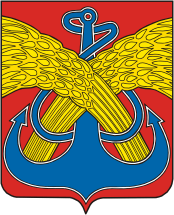
- Coat of arms
- Location of Kamensky District in Altai Krai
- Coordinates: 53°48′N 81°21′E
- Country: Russia
- Federal subject: Altai Krai
- Established: 9 December 1925
- Administrative center: Kamen-na-Obi

Area
  - Total: 3,666 km^{2} (1,415 sq mi)

Population (2010 Census)
  - Total: 12,025
  - Density: 3.280/km^{2} (8.496/sq mi)
  - Urban: 0%
  - Rural: 100%

Administrative structure
  - Administrative divisions: 1 Towns of district significance, 13 Selsoviets
  - Inhabited localities: 33 rural localities

Municipal structure
  - Municipally incorporated as: Kamensky Municipal District
  - Municipal divisions: 1 urban settlements, 13 rural settlements
- Time zone: UTC+7 (MSK+4)
- OKTMO ID: 01616000
- Website: http://kamenrai.ru

Population of Kamensky District
- 2010 Census: 12,025
- 2002 Census: 16,600
- 1989 Census: 16,977
- 1979 Census: 18,801

Kamensky District (Russian: Ка́менский райо́н) is an administrative and municipal district (raion), one of the fifty-nine in Altai Krai, Russia. It is located in the north of the krai and borders Krutikhinsky and Suzunsky Districts of Novosibirsk Oblast in the north, Shelabolikhinsky District in the east, Bayevsky and Tyumentsevsky Districts in the south, and Pankrushikhinsky District in the west. The area of the district is 3,666 square kilometers (1,415 sq mi). Its administrative center is the town of Kamen-na-Obi. As of the 2010 Census, the total population of the district was 12,025.

== Geography ==
The district is located on the northern border of Altai Krai, straddling the Ob River, which runs through the district from east to west as it makes its turn to the north. The terrain is hilly steppe on the Ob Plateau. Besides the Ob, the district is also watered by the Kulunda Main Canal, which has its head pumping station in Kamen-na-Obi. While much of the area is agricultural land, there are forests in the east on the meandering Ob floodplain, as well as numerous fresh and saltwater lakes. The soils are medium chernozem (black), sandy soils. The regional city of Barnaul is 125 km to the east.

== Climate ==
Average temperature in January is −19.7 °C (−3.5 °F), and average July temperature is 18.9 °C (66.0 °F). Annual precipitation is 330 millimeters (13 in). The climate is Humid continental climate, cool summer, (Dfb). This climate is characterized by large swings in temperature, both diurnally and seasonally, with mild summers and cold, snowy winters.

== Economy ==
Employment in the district is focused on food processing and agriculture.
