= List of rural localities in Altai Krai =

Map of Russia with Altai Krai highlighted

This is a list of rural localities in Altai Krai. Altai Krai (Russian: Алта́йский край, romanized: Altaysky kray, IPA: [ɐlˈtajskʲɪj kraj]) is a federal subject of Russia (a krai). It borders with, clockwise from the west, Kazakhstan (East Kazakhstan Region and Pavlodar Region), Novosibirsk and Kemerovo Oblasts, and the Altai Republic. The krai's administrative center is the city of Barnaul. As of the 2010 Census, the population of the krai was 2,419,755.

== Aleysky District ==
Rural localities in Aleysky District:

- Alexandrovsky
- Aleysky
- Beryozovsky
- Bezgolosovo
- Bolshepanyushevo
- Borikha
- Borovskoye
- Chernyshevsky
- Druzhba
- Dubrovsky
- Kabakovo
- Kashino
- Kirovskoye
- Kondratyevsky
- Krasnodubrovsky
- Krasny Yar
- Malakhovo
- Malinovka
- Mamontovsky
- Mokhovskoye
- Novokolpakovo
- Novonikolsky
- Oktyabrsky
- Oskolkovo
- Pervomaysky
- Plotava
- Priyatelsky
- Savinka
- Serebrennikovo
- Solnechny
- Sovkhozny
- Tolstaya Dubrova
- Troitsky
- Uryupino
- Urzhum
- Uspenovka
- Vavilon
- Vetyolki
- Yazevka-Sibirskaya
- Zavety Ilyicha
- Zelyonaya Polyana

== Altaysky District ==
Rural localities in Altaysky District:

- Altayskoye
- Aya
- Basargino
- Beloye
- Bolshaya Kyrkyla
- Bulatovo
- Bulukhta
- Cheremshanka
- Danilovka
- Katun
- Kazanka
- Komar
- Kuyacha
- Kuyagan
- Makaryevka
- Nikolskoye
- Nizhnekamenka
- Nizhnekayancha
- Proletarka
- Rossoshi
- Rudnik
- Sarasa
- Starobelokurikha
- Tourak
- Verkh-Ya

== Barnaul ==
Rural localities in Barnaul urban okrug:

- Belmesyovo
- Berezovka
- Borzovaya Zaimka
- Chernitsk
- Gonba
- Kazyonnaya Zaimka
- Konyukhi
- Lebyazhye
- Lesnoy
- Mokhnatushka
- Nauchny Gorodok
- Novomikhaylovka
- Polzunovo
- Prigorodny
- Vlasikha
- Vlasikha
- Yagodnoye
- Zemlyanukha

== Bayevsky District ==
Rural localities in Bayevsky District:

- Bayevo
- Chumanka
- Kapustinka
- Nizhnechumanka
- Nizhnepayva
- Paklino
- Pavlovka
- Plotava
- Pokrovka
- Proslaukha
- Rybnye Borki
- Safronovo
- Sitnikovo
- Verkh-Chumanka
- Verkh-Payva

== Biysk ==
Rural localities in Biysk urban okrug:

- Fominskoye
- Nagorny
- Odintsovka
- Zhavoronkovo

== Biysky District ==
Rural localities in Biysky District:

- Amursky
- Borovoy
- Chuysky
- Klyuchi
- Lesnoye
- Malougrenyovo
- Maloyeniseyskoye
- Novikovo
- Obraztsovka
- Pevomayskoye
- Predgorny
- Prigorodny
- Shebalino
- Srostki
- Svetloozyorskoye
- Ust-Katun
- Verkh-Bekhtemir
- Verkh-Katunskoye
- Yagodny
- Yasnaya Polyana
- Yeniseyskoye
- Zaozerny
- Zarya

== Blagoveshchensky District ==
Rural localities in Blagoveshchensky District:

- Alexandrovka
- Alexeyevka
- Baygamut
- Dmitriyevka
- Dolinka
- Glyaden
- Glyaden-2
- Glyaden-3
- Glyaden-4
- Kalinovka
- Khoroshavka
- Kurgan
- Lenki
- Melnikovka
- Mikhaylovka
- Nikolayevka
- Nizhny Kuchuk
- Novokulundinka
- Novotyumentsevo
- Orlean
- Pregradinka
- Shimolino
- Sukhoy Rakit
- Suvorovka
- Tatyanovka
- Telmansky
- Yagotino
- Yagotinskaya

== Burlinsky District ==
Rural localities in Burlinsky District:

- Bigeldy
- Burla
- Burlinka
- Chernavka
- Gusinaya Lyaga
- Kineral
- Kirillovka
- Lesnoye
- Mikhaylovka
- Mirny
- Novoalexeyevka
- Novoandreyevka
- Novopeschanoye
- Novoselskoye
- Orekhovo
- Partizanskoye
- Pervomayskoye
- Petrovka
- Prityka
- Staropeschanoye
- Tsvetopol
- Ustyanka
- Volchy Rakit

== Bystroistoksky District ==
Rural localities in Bystroistoksky District:

- Akutikha
- Bystry Istok
- Khleborobnoye
- Novopokrovka
- Novosmolenka
- Pervomaysky
- Priobskoye
- Smolensky
- Soldatovo
- Ust-Anuy
- Verkh-Anuyskoye
- Verkh-Ozyornoe

== Charyshsky District ==
Rural localities in Charyshsky District:

- Charyshskoye

== Kalmansky District ==
Rural localities in Kalmansky District:

- Alexandrovka
- Altay
- Buranovo
- Ivanovka
- Kalmanka
- Kubanka
- Novobarnaulka
- Novoromanovo
- Novy
- Panfilovo
- Shadrino
- Shilovo
- Troitsk
- Ust-Aleyka
- Zimari

== Kamensky District ==
Rural localities in Kamensky District:

- 3 Internatsional
- Allak
- Dresvyanka
- Dukhovaya
- Filippovsky
- Gonokhovo
- Kalinovka
- Klyuchi
- Kornilovo
- Lugovoye
- Maletino
- Mikhaylovka
- Myski
- Novoyarki
- Obskoye
- Oktyabrsky
- Plotinnaya
- Plotnikovo
- Podvetrenno-Teleutskoye
- Poperechnoye
- Razdolny
- Rybnoye
- Samarsky
- Sokolovo
- Stolbovo
- Tambovsky
- Tolstovsky
- Verkh-Allak
- Vetrenno-Teleutskoye
- Zelyonaya Dubrava

== Khabarsky District ==
Rural localities in Khabarsky District:

- Alexeyevka
- Berezovka
- Bogatskoye
- Dobrovolshchina
- Kalinovka
- Khabary
- Khabary
- Korotoyak
- Malopavlovka
- Martovka
- Michurinskoye
- Moskovka
- Nechayevka
- Novofyodorovka
- Novoilyinka
- Novoplotava
- Novovasilyevka
- Pioner Truda
- Plyoso-Kurya
- Poperechnoye
- Rassvet
- Serp i Molot
- Smirnovsky
- Sverdlovskoye
- Topolnoye
- Tselinny
- Ust-Kurya
- Utyanka
- Vasilyevka
- Voskhod
- Yasnaya Polyana
- Zyatkova Rechka

== Klyuchevsky District ==
Rural localities in Klyuchevsky District:

- Istimis
- Kaip
- Klyuchi
- Krasny Yar
- Makarovka
- Markovka
- Novopoltava
- Novovoznesenka
- Petrovka
- Petukhi
- Platovka
- Pokrovka
- Severka
- Slava
- Tselinny
- Vasilchuki
- Zapadny Ugol
- Zelyonaya Polyana

== Kosikhinsky District ==
Rural localities in Kosikhinsky District:

- Kosikha
- Malakhovo
- Ovchinnikovo
- Polkovnikovo
- Verkh-Zhilino

== Krasnogorsky District ==
Rural localities in Krasnogorsky District:

- Berezovka
- Krasnogorskoye
- Lugovoye
- Souskanikha
- Ust-Kazha

== Krasnoshchyokovsky District ==
Rural localities in Krasnoshchyokovsky District:

- Berezovka
- Charyshsky
- Chineta
- Krasnoshchyokovo
- Malaya Suyetka
- Novoshipunovo

== Krutikhinsky District ==
Rural localities in Krutikhinsky District:

- Bolshoy Log
- Borovoye
- Buyan
- Dolganka
- Karasi
- Krasnoryazhsky
- Krutikha
- Malovolchanka
- Maslyakha
- Moskovsky
- Novouvalsky
- Podborny
- Pryganka
- Radostny
- Volchno-Burlinskoye
- Zakovryashino

== Kulundinsky District ==
Rural localities in Kulundinsky District:

- Ananyevka
- Belotserkovka
- Estlan
- Gorodetsky
- Kilty
- Kirey
- Konstantinovka
- Krasnaya Sloboda
- Krotovka
- Kulunda
- Kursk
- Mirabilit
- Mirny
- Myshkino
- Novopetrovka
- Novopokrovka
- Novoznamenka
- Oktyabrsky
- Orlovka
- Ozyornoye
- Popasnoye
- Semyonovka
- Sergeyevka
- Smirnenkoye
- Troitsk
- Vinogradovka
- Voskresenovka
- Vozdvizhenka
- Yekaterinovka
- Zheleznodorozhnaya Kazarma 24 km
- Zlatopol

== Kuryinsky District ==
Rural localities in Kuryinsky District:

- Bugryshikha
- Gornovka
- Ivanovka
- Kalmatsky
- Kamenka
- Kazantsevo
- Kolyvan
- Krasnoznamenka
- Krasnoznamensky
- Kurya
- Kuznetsovo
- Mikhaylovka
- Novofirsovo
- Novoznamenka
- Podkhoz
- Podpalattsy
- Podzaymishche
- Posyolok imeni 8 Marta
- Ruchyovo
- Rudovozovo
- Trusovo
- Ust-Talovka

== Kytmanovsky District ==
Rural localities in Kytmanovsky District:

- Dmitro-Titovo
- Kalinovsky
- Kytmanovo
- Novokytmanovo
- Novoozyornoye
- Otradnoye
- Poroshino
- Semyonovo-Krasilovo
- Staraya Taraba
- Uskovo
- Zarechnoye

== Loktevsky District ==
Rural localities in Loktevsky District:

- Alexandrovka
- Antoshikha
- Ermoshikha
- Georgiyevka
- Gilyovo
- Kirovsky
- Kucherovka
- Lokot
- Masalsky
- Mezhdurechye
- Mirny
- Nikolayevka
- Novenkoye
- Novomikhaylovka
- Pavlovka
- Pokrovka
- Removsky
- Samarka
- Sovetsky Put
- Stepnoy
- Uspenka
- Ustyanka
- Vtoraya Kamenka
- Zolotukha

== Mamontovsky District ==
Rural localities in Mamontovsky District:

- Kadnikovo
- Kostin Log
- Krestyanka
- Mamontovo
- Pervomaysky
- Poteryayevka
- Travnoye
- Yermachikha

== Mikhaylovsky District ==
Rural localities in Mikhaylovsky District:

- Aschegul
- Bastan
- Irkutsky
- Mikhaylovskoye
- Nazarovka
- Nevodnoye
- Nikolayevka
- Nikolayevka
- Poluyamki
- Rakity

== Nemetsky National District ==
Rural localities in Nemetsky National District:

- Alexandrovka
- Degtyarka
- Dvorskoye
- Galbshtadt
- Grishkovka
- Kamyshi
- Krasnoarmeysky
- Kusak
- Lesnoye
- Nikolayevka
- Orlovo
- Podsosnovo
- Polevoye
- Protasovo
- Redkaya Dubrava
- Shumanovka

== Novichikhinsky District ==
Rural localities in Novichikhinsky District:

- Melnikovo
- Novichikha
- Solonovka

== Pankrushikhinsky District ==
Rural localities in Pankrushikhinsky District:

- Beregovoye
- Berezovsky
- Lensky
- Lukovka
- Pankrushikha
- Petrovsky
- Romanovo
- Zarechny
- Zarya

== Pavlovsky District ==
Rural localities in Pavlovsky District:

- Arbuzovka
- Arbuzovka
- Borovikovo
- Buranovka
- Chernopyatovo
- Cheryomno-Podgornoye
- Cheryomnoye
- Kasmala
- Kolyvanskoye
- Komsomolsky
- Krasnaya Dubrava
- Krasny May
- Lebyazhye
- Novye Zori
- Pavlovsk
- Prutskoy
- Rogozikha
- Sarai
- Shakhi
- Sibirskiye Ogni
- Solonovka
- Stukovo
- Urozhayny
- Yelunino
- Zhukovka

== Pervomaysky District ==
Rural localities in Pervomaysky District:

- Akulovo
- Bayunovskiye Klyuchi
- Bazhevo
- Berezovka
- Beshentsevo
- Bobrovka
- Borovikha
- Firsovo
- Golubtsovo
- Golyshevo
- Kazachy
- Kislukha
- Kostyaki
- Lebyazhye
- Lesnaya Polyana
- Lesnoy
- Lesnoy
- Logovskoye
- Losikha
- Malaya Povalikha
- Malaya Rechka
- Nizhnyaya Petrovka
- Nogino
- Novoberezovka
- Novochesnokovka
- Novokopylovo
- Novokrayushkino
- Novopovalikha
- Novy Mir
- Novy
- Oktyabrskoye
- Pervomayskoye
- Porkovka
- Posyolok Ilyicha
- Povalikha
- Pravda
- Purysevo
- Rasskazikha
- Rogulichny
- Sannikovo
- Severny
- Sibirsky
- Solnechnoye
- Sorochy Log
- Sosnovka
- Starokraychikovo
- Stepnoy
- Talovka
- Volga
- Zheleznodorozhnaya Kazarma 193 km
- Zhilino
- Zhuravlikha
- Zudilovo

== Petropavlovsky District ==
Rural localities in Petropavlovsky District:

- Krasny Vostok
- Petropavlovskoye

== Pospelikhinsky District ==
Rural localities in Pospelikhinsky District:

- Berezovka
- Kalmytskiye Mysy
- Khodayevsky
- Krasnoyarskoye
- Nikolayevka
- Pospelikha
- Pospelikhinsky
- Posyolok imeni Mamontova
- Stepnobugrinsky

== Rebrikhinsky District ==
Rural localities in Rebrikhinsky District:

- Belovo
- Georgiyevka
- Klochki
- Lesnoy
- Panovo
- Ploskoseminsky
- Podstepnoye
- Rebrikha
- Shumilikha
- Tulay
- Ust-Mosikha
- Verkh-Borovlyanka
- Zelyonaya Roshcha
- Zimino

== Rodinsky District ==
Rural localities in Rodinsky District:

- Kayaushka
- Kochki
- Krasny Altay
- Mirny
- Novotroitsk
- Pokrovka
- Razdolnoye
- Razumovka
- Rodino
- Shatalovka
- Shubinka
- Stepnoy Kuchuk
- Stepnoye
- Tizek
- Tsentralnoye
- Voznesenka
- Vyacheslavka
- Yaroslavtsev Log
- Zelyonaya Dubrava
- Zelyony Lug

== Romanovsky District ==
Rural localities in Romanovsky District:

- Buranovka
- Dubrovino
- Gilyov-Log
- Granovka
- Guseletovo
- Kazantsevo
- Maysky
- Mormyshi
- Pamyat Kommunarov
- Pervomaysky
- Rassvet
- Romanovo
- Sidorovka
- Tambovsky
- Zakladnoye
- Zhuravli

== Rubtsovsky District ==
Rural localities in Rubtsovsky District:

- Aksenovka
- Berezovka
- Bezrukavka
- Bobkovo
- Bolshaya Shelkovka
- Bugry
- Chayka
- Cheburikha
- Dalny
- Kalinovka
- Katkovo
- Kolos
- Kolos
- Kuybyshevo
- Mamontovo
- Michurinsky
- Nazarovka
- Novoalexandrovka
- Novomatveyevka
- Novonikolayevka
- Novorossiysky
- Novosklyuikha
- Novovoznesenka
- Peschany
- Polovinkino
- Posyolok VI Kongressa Kominterna
- Posyolok imeni Kalinina
- Poteryayevka
- Priozerny
- Pushkino
- Rakity
- Romanovka
- Samarka
- Saratovka
- Shmidta
- Tishinka
- Traktorny
- Troinka
- Vesyoloyarsk
- Vishnevka
- Vtorye Korosteli
- Vympel
- Zakharovo
- Zarnitsa
- Zheleznodorozhnaya Kazarma 498 km
- Zheleznodorozhnaya Kazarma 512 km
- Zheleznodorozhnaya Kazarma 519 km
- Zheleznodorozhnaya Kazarma 538 km
- Zheleznodorozhnaya Kazarma 543 km
- Zelyonaya Dubrava
- Zerno

== Shelabolikhinsky District ==
Rural localities in Shelabolikhinsky District:

- Baturovo
- Bykovo
- Chaykino
- Ilyinka
- Inya
- Ivanovka
- Kiprino
- Krutishka
- Kuchuk
- Lugovoye
- Makarovo
- Malinovka
- Novoobintsevo
- Novosyolovka
- Omutskoye
- Podgorny
- Sakmarino
- Seleznyovo
- Shelabolikha
- Sibirka
- Verkh-Kuchuk

== Shipunovsky District ==
Rural localities in Shipunovsky District:

- Andreyevka
- Artamanovo
- Batalovo
- Beloglazovo
- Berezovka
- Bestuzhevo
- Bobrovka
- Bykovo
- Chupino
- Gorkovskoye
- Ilyinka
- Kalinovka
- Komarikha
- Korobeynikovo
- Kosobokovo
- Meteli
- Nechunayevo
- Porozhneye
- Rodino
- Samsonovo
- Shipunovo
- Tugozvonovo
- Urlapovo
- Ust-Porozikha
- Vorobyovo
- Yasnaya Polyana
- Yeltsovka
- Zerkaly

== Sibirsky ==
Rural localities in Sibirsky urban okrug:

- Sibirsky

== Slavgorod ==
Rural localities in Slavgorod urban okrug:

- Andreyevka
- Arkhangelskoye
- Aynak
- Ballastny Kuryer
- Bursol
- Danilovka
- Dobrovka
- Kalistratikha
- Kuatovka
- Maximovka
- Novovoznesenka
- Panovka
- Pavlovka
- Pokrovka
- Prigorodnoye
- Raygorod
- Selektsionnoye
- Semyonovka
- Slavgorodskoye
- Vesyoloye
- Vladimirovka
- Yekaterinovka
- Zelyonaya Roshcha
- Znamenka

== Smolensky District ==
Rural localities in Smolensky District:

- Anuyskoye
- Chernovaya
- Novotyryshkino
- Smolenskoye
- Solonovka
- Starotyryshkino
- Sychevka

== Soloneshensky District ==
Rural localities in Soloneshensky District:

- Berezovka
- Berezovo
- Chegon
- Dyomino
- Iskra
- Lyutayevo
- Sibiryachikha
- Soloneshnoye
- Telezhikha
- Topolnoye
- Tumanovo

== Soltonsky District ==
Rural localities in Soltonsky District:

- Neninka
- Solton

== Sovetsky District ==
Rural localities in Sovetsky District:

- Krasny Yar
- Nikolskoye
- Platovo
- Shulgin Log
- Sovetskoye
- Urozhaynoye

== Suyetsky District ==
Rural localities in Suyetsky District:

- Alexandrovka
- Beregovoy
- Boronsky
- Dobrovolsky
- Mikhaylovka
- Nikolayevka
- Nizhnyaya Suyetka
- Oktyabrsky
- Osinovsky
- Posyolok imeni Vladimira Ilyicha
- Sibirsky Gigant
- Tsibermanovo
- Ukrainsky
- Verkh-Suyetka

== Tabunsky District ==
Rural localities in Tabunsky District:

- Alexandrovka
- Altayskoye
- Bolsheromanovka
- Bolsheslavino
- Georgiyevka
- Granichnoye
- Kamyshenka
- Kanna
- Karpilovka
- Khorosheye
- Lebedino
- Nikolayevka
- Novokiyevka
- Novorossiyka
- Novosovkhozny
- Sambor
- Saratovka
- Serebropol
- Tabuny
- Udalnoye
- Uspenka
- Yambor
- Yelizavetgrad
- Yermakovka
- Zabavnoye

== Talmensky District ==
Rural localities in Talmensky District:

- Kazantsevo
- Litvinovka
- Novotroitsk

== Togulsky District ==
Rural localities in Togulsky District:

- Antipino
- Buranovo
- Kolonkovo
- Lnozavod
- Novoiushino
- Shumikha
- Stary Togul
- Titovo
- Togul
- Toptushka
- Uksunay
- Verkh-Koptelka

== Topchikhinsky District ==
Rural localities in Topchikhinsky District:

- Khabazino
- Kirovsky
- Komarikha
- Makaryevka
- Parfyonovo
- Peschanoye
- Topchikha
- Volodarka

== Tretyakovsky District ==
Rural localities in Tretyakovsky District:

- Chekanovo
- Ivanovka
- Korbolikha
- Krasnoye Razdolye
- Kryuchki
- Lopatinka
- Mikhaylovka
- Novoaleyskoye
- Novogalstovka
- Novokamyshenka
- Pervokamenka
- Ploskoye
- Semyonovka
- Shupunikha
- Staroaleyskoye
- Tretyakovo
- Verkh-Aleyka
- Yekaterininskoye

== Troitsky District ==
Rural localities in Troitsky District:

- Bolshaya Rechka
- Borovlyanka
- Mnogoozyorny
- Troitskoye
- Yeltsovka
- Zavodskoye

== Tselinny District ==
Rural localities in Tselinny District:

- Berezovka
- Maly Bashchelak
- Marushka
- Mayak
- Sentelek
- Tselinnoye
- Tulata
- Verkh-Shubinka

== Tyumentsevsky District ==
Rural localities in Tyumentsevsky District:

- Andronovo
- Berezovka
- Karpovsky
- Latkinsky
- Sosnovka
- Tyumentsevo
- Vylkovo
- Yudikha

== Uglovsky District ==
Rural localities in Uglovsky District:

- Alexeyevka
- Belenkoye
- Bor-Kosobulat
- Borisovka
- Chernokorovnikovo
- Gorkoye
- Kormikha
- Krugloye
- Kuybyshevo
- Laptev Log
- Lyapunovo
- Mirny
- Naumovka
- Novouglovsky
- Ozyorno-Kuznetsovo
- Ozyorno-Kuznetsovsky Leskhoz
- Pavlovka
- Pervye Korosteli
- Shadrukha
- Simonovo
- Topolinsky Leskhoz
- Topolnoye
- Uglovskoye
- Valovoy Kordon

== Ust-Kalmansky District ==
Rural localities in Ust-Kalmansky District:

- Buranovo
- Charyshskoye
- Druzhba
- Kabanovo
- Mikhaylovka
- Novoburanovo
- Novokalmanka
- Novotroyenka
- Novy Charysh
- Ogni
- Ponomaryovo
- Priozerny
- Slyudyanka
- Stepnoy
- Ust-Kalmanka
- Ust-Kamyshenka
- Ust-Yermilikha
- Vasilyevka
- Verkh-Slyudyanka
- Vostochny
- Yeltsovka
- Zapadny

== Ust-Pristansky District ==
Rural localities in Ust-Pristansky District:

- Belovo
- Klepikovo
- Korobeynikovo
- Romanovo
- Ust-Charyshskaya Pristan

== Volchikhinsky District ==
Rural localities in Volchikhinsky District:

- Beryozovsky
- Bor-Forpost
- Komintern
- Malyshev Log
- Novokormikha
- Plodosovkhoz
- Pravda
- Priborovoye
- Pyatkov Log
- Selivyorstovo
- Solonovka
- Ust-Kormikha
- Ust-Volchikha
- Volchikha
- Vostrovo

== Yegoryevsky District ==
Rural localities in Yegoryevsky District:

- Borisovka
- Dolino
- Ivanovka
- Kruglo-Sementsy
- Lebyazhye
- Malaya Shelkovka
- Mirny
- Novosovetsky
- Novoyegoryevskoye
- Peresheyechny
- Pervomayskoye
- Peschany Borok
- Petukhov Log
- Rechka-Kormikha
- Shubinka
- Sibir
- Srosty
- Titovka
- Zhernovtsy

== Yeltsovsky District ==
Rural localities in Yeltsovsky District:

- Aksenovo
- Bragino
- Cheremshanka
- Kedrovka
- Martynovo
- Novokamenka
- Poslednikovo
- Pushtulim
- Troitsk
- Verkh-Nenya
- Yeltsovka

== Zalesovsky District ==
Rural localities in Zalesovsky District:

- Borisovo
- Cheryomushkino
- Dumchevo
- Gunikha
- Kalinovka
- Kamyshenka
- Kordon
- Maly Kaltay
- Muravey
- Nikolsky
- Peshcherka
- Shatunovo
- Tundrikha
- Vidonovo
- Voskhod
- Zakharovo
- Zalesovo
- Zaplyvino

== Zarinsky District ==
Rural localities in Zarinsky District:

- Afonino
- Alambay
- Borovlyanka
- Golubtsovo
- Golukha
- Gonoshikha
- Goryushino
- Grishino
- Kazantsevo
- Khmelyovka
- Komarskoye
- Malinovka
- Mironovka
- Novodrachyonino
- Novokopylovo
- Novomonoshkino
- Novozyryanovo
- Omutnaya
- Shpagino
- Smaznevo
- Smirnovo
- Sosnovka
- Starodrachenino
- Staroglushinka
- Tyagun
- Verkh-Kamyshenka
- Voskresenka
- Yanovo
- Zhulanikha
- Zyryanovka

== Zavyalovsky District ==
Rural localities in Zavyalovsky District:

- Alexandrovka
- Chernavka
- Chistoozyorka
- Dobraya Volya
- Gilyovka
- Glubokoye
- Gonokhovo
- Kamyshenka
- Kharitonovo
- Krasnodubrovsky
- Malinovsky
- Novokulikovsky
- Ovechkino
- Ovechkino
- Soboli
- Svetloye
- Tumanovsky
- Zavyalovo

== Zmeinogorsky District ==
Rural localities in Zmeinogorsky District:

- Andreyevsky
- Baranovka
- Berezovka
- Bespalovsky
- Cherepanovsky
- Galtsovka
- Karamyshevo
- Krasnogvardeysky
- Kuzminka
- Lazurka
- Lokotok
- Nikolsk
- Novokuznetsovka
- Oktyabrsky
- Otrada
- Ryazanovka
- Savvushka
- Talovka
- Varshava
- Voronezh

== Zonalny District ==
Rural localities in Zonalny District:

- Bulanikha
- Komarovo
- Lugovskoye
- Mirny
- Novaya Chemrovka
- Novaya Mikhaylovka
- Oktyabrsky
- Pleshkovo
- Safonovka
- Savinovo
- Shubenka
- Sokolovo
- Urozhayny
- Voskhod
- Zonalnoye

== See also ==
- Lists of rural localities in Russia
