= Shubenka =

Shubenka Шубёнка
- Village
- Location within Altai Krai Location within Russia
- Coordinates: 52°38′N 85°05′E
- Country: Russia
- Region: Altai Krai
- District: Zonalny District
- Time zone: UTC+7:00

Shubenka (Russian: Шубёнка) is a rural locality (a selo) and the administrative center of Shubensky Selsoviet of Zonalny District, Altai Krai, Russia. The population was 1,248 as of 2016. There are 24 streets.

== Geography ==
Shubenka is located on the banks of the Chemrovka and Shubinka Rivers, 19 km east of Zonalnoye (the district's administrative centre) by road. Staraya Chemrovka is the nearest rural locality.

== Ethnicity ==
The village is inhabited by Russians and others.
