= Tsibermanovo =

Tsibermanovo Циберманово
- Settlement
- Location within Altai Krai Location within Russia
- Coordinates: 53°18′N 79°48′E
- Country: Russia
- Region: Altai Krai
- District: Suyetsky District
- Time zone: UTC+7:00

Tsibermanovo (Russian: Циберманово) is a rural locality (a settlement) in Nizhnesuyetsky Selsoviet, Suyetsky District, Altai Krai, Russia. The population was 66 as of 2013. There are 2 streets.

== Geography ==
Tsibermanovo is located 27 km west of Verkh-Suyetka (the district's administrative centre) by road. Nechayevka is the nearest rural locality.
