= Novotyryshkino =

Novotyryshkino Новотырышкино
- Selo
- Location within Altai Krai Location within Russia
- Coordinates: 52°05′N 84°54′E
- Country: Russia
- Region: Altai Krai
- District: Smolensky District
- Time zone: UTC+7:00

Novotyryshkino (Russian: Новотырышкино) is a rural locality (a selo) and the administrative center of Novotyryshkinsky Selsoviet, Smolensky District, Altai Krai, Russia. The population was 1,880 as of 2013. There are 22 streets in the locality.

== Geography ==
Novotyryshkino is located 38 km southwest of Smolenskoye (the district's administrative centre) by road. Sychyovka is the nearest rural locality.
