= Yagodnoye, Altai Krai =

Yagodnoye Ягодное
- Settlement
- Location within Altai Krai Location within Russia
- Coordinates: 53°13′N 83°37′E
- Country: Russia
- Region: Altai Krai
- District: Barnaul
- Time zone: UTC+7:00

Yagodnoye (Russian: Ягодное) is a rural locality (a settlement) in Barnaul, Altai Krai, Russia. The population was 1,188 as of 2013. There are 10 streets.

== Geography ==
Yagodnoye is located 22 km southwest of Barnaul by road. Tsentralny is the nearest rural locality.
