= Chernitsk =

Chernitsk Черницк
- Settlement
- Location within Altai Krai Location within Russia
- Coordinates: 53°12′N 83°33′E
- Country: Russia
- Region: Altai Krai
- District: Barnaul
- Time zone: UTC+7:00

Chernitsk (Russian: Черницк) is a rural locality (a settlement) in Barnaul, Altai Krai, Russia. The population was 822 as of 2013. There are 12 streets.

== Geography ==
Chernitsk is located 25 km southwest of Barnaul by road. Mokhnatushka is the nearest rural locality.
