= Savvushka =

Savvushka Саввушка
- Selo
- Location within Altai Krai Location within Russia
- Coordinates: 51°21′N 82°08′E
- Country: Russia
- Region: Altai Krai
- District: Zmeinogorsky District
- Time zone: UTC+7:00

Savvushka (Russian: Саввушка) is a rural locality (a selo) Savvushinsky Selsoviet, Zmeinogorsky District, Altai Krai, Russia. The population was 1,172 as of 2013. There are 6 streets.

== Geography ==
Savvushka is located 24 km north of Zmeinogorsk (the district's administrative centre) by road. Novokharkovka is the nearest rural locality.
