= Bulanikha =

Bulanikha Буланиха
- Selo
- Location within Altai Krai Location within Russia
- Coordinates: 52°48′N 84°55′E
- Country: Russia
- Region: Altai Krai
- District: Zonalny District
- Time zone: UTC+7:00

Bulanikha (Russian: Буланиха) is a rural locality (a selo) and the administrative center of Bulanikhinsky Selsoviet, Zonalny District, Altai Krai, Russia. The population was 2,463 as of 2013. There are 17 streets.

== Geography ==
Bulanikha is located 22 km north of Zonalnoye (the district's administrative centre) by road. Parizhskaya Kommuna is the nearest rural locality.
