= Podkhoz =

Podkhoz Подхоз
- Selo
- Location within Altai Krai Location within Russia
- Coordinates: 51°19′N 82°32′E
- Country: Russia
- Region: Altai Krai
- District: Kuryinsky District
- Time zone: UTC+7:00

Podkhoz (Russian: Подхоз) is a rural locality (a selo) in Kolyvansky Selsoviet, Kuryinsky District, Altai Krai, Russia. The population was 102 as of 2013. There are 2 streets.

== Geography ==
Podkhoz is located 54 km southeast of Kurya (the district's administrative centre) by road. Kolyvan is the nearest rural locality.
