= Yekaterinovka, Slavgorod, Altai Krai =

Yekaterinovka Екатериновка
- Selo
- Location within Altai Krai Location within Russia
- Coordinates: 52°51′N 78°29′E
- Country: Russia
- Region: Altai Krai
- District: Slavgorod
- Time zone: UTC+7:00

Yekaterinovka (Russian: Екатериновка) is a rural locality (a selo) in Slavgorod, Altai Krai, Russia. The population was 73 as of 2013. There are 2 streets.
