= Ballastny Kuryer =

Ballastny Kuryer Балластный Карьер
- Settlement
- Location within Altai Krai Location within Russia
- Coordinates: 53°07′N 78°30′E
- Country: Russia
- Region: Altai Krai
- District: Slavgorod
- Time zone: UTC+7:00

Ballastny Kuryer (Russian: Балластный Карьер) is a rural locality (a settlement) in Slavgorod, Altai Krai, Russia. The population was 140 as of 2013. There are 3 streets.
