= Ovchinnikovo, Altai Krai =

Ovchinnikovo Овчинниково
- Selo
- Location within Altai Krai Location within Russia
- Coordinates: 53°12′N 84°30′E
- Country: Russia
- Region: Altai Krai
- District: Kosikhinsky District
- Time zone: UTC+7:00

Ovchinnikovo (Russian: Овчинниково) is a rural locality (a selo) in Kontoshinsky Selsoviet, Kosikhinsky District, Altai Krai, Russia. The population was 203 as of 2013. There are 10 streets.

== Geography ==
Ovchinnikovo is located 30 km southwest of Kosikha (the district's administrative centre) by road. Kontoshino is the nearest rural locality.
