= Gonoshikha =

Gonoshikha Гоношиха
- Selo
- Location within Altai Krai Location within Russia
- Coordinates: 53°45′N 84°48′E
- Country: Russia
- Region: Altai Krai
- District: Zarinsky District
- Time zone: UTC+7:00

Gonoshikha (Russian: Гоношиха) is a rural locality (a selo) and the administrative center of Gonoshikhinsky Selsoviet, Zarinsky District, Altai Krai, Russia. The population was 593 as of 2013. There are 9 streets.

== Geography ==
Gonoshikha is located 15 km southeast of Zarinsk (the district's administrative centre) by road. Novokrasilovo and Starokopylovo are the nearest rural localities.
