= Novoznamenka =

Novoznamenka Новознаменка
- Selo
- Location within Altai Krai Location within Russia
- Coordinates: 52°34′N 78°37′E
- Country: Russia
- Region: Altai Krai
- District: Kulundinsky District
- Time zone: UTC+7:00

Novoznamenka (Russian: Новознаменка) is a rural locality (a selo) in Oktyabrsky Selsoviet, Kulundinsky District, Altai Krai, Russia. The population was 32 as of 2013. There are 3 streets.

== Geography ==
Novoznamenka is located 25 km west of Kulunda (the district's administrative centre) by road. Orlovka is the nearest rural locality.
