= Ermoshikha =

Ermoshikha Ермошиха
- Village
- Location within Altai Krai Location within Russia
- Coordinates: 50°46′N 81°41′E
- Country: Russia
- Region: Altai Krai
- District: Loktevsky District
- Time zone: UTC+7:00

Ermoshikha (Russian: Ермошиха) is a rural locality (a selo) and the administrative center of Ermoshikhinsky Selsoviet of Loktevsky District, Altai Krai, Russia. The population was 150 as of 2016. There are 5 streets.

== Geography ==
Ermoshikha is located 32 km south of Gornyak (the district's administrative centre) by road. Gorkunovo is the nearest rural locality.
