= Volchy Rakit =

Volchy Rakit Волчий Ракит
- Selo
- Location within Altai Krai Location within Russia
- Coordinates: 53°22′N 78°50′E
- Country: Russia
- Region: Altai Krai
- District: Burlinsky District
- Time zone: UTC+7:00

Volchy Rakit (Russian: Волчий Ракит) is a rural locality (a selo) in Ustyansky Selsoviet, Burlinsky District, Altai Krai, Russia. The population was 49 as of 2013. It was founded in 1939. There are 2 streets.

== Geography ==
Volchy Rakit is located 53 km east of Burla (the district's administrative centre) by road. Podsosnovo is the nearest rural locality.
