= Aschegul =

Aschegul Ащегуль
- Village
- Location within Altai Krai Location within Russia
- Coordinates: 52°07′N 79°46′E
- Country: Russia
- Region: Altai Krai
- District: Mikhaylovsky District
- Time zone: UTC+7:00

Aschegul (Russian: Ащегуль) is a rural locality (a selo) and the administrative center of Aschegulsky Selsoviet of Mikhaylovsky District, Altai Krai, Russia. The population was 359 in 2016. There are 7 streets.

== Geography ==
Aschegul is located 40 km north of Mikhaylovskoye (the district's administrative centre) by road. Poluyamki is the nearest rural locality.
