= Tolstovsky =

Tolstovsky Толстовский
- Settlement
- Location within Altai Krai Location within Russia
- Coordinates: 53°40′N 80°56′E
- Country: Russia
- Region: Altai Krai
- District: Kamensky District
- Time zone: UTC+7:00

Tolstovsky (Russian: Толстовский) is a rural locality (a settlement) and the administrative center of Tolstovsky Selsoviet, Kamensky District, Altai Krai, Russia. The population was 615 as of 2013. There are 8 streets.

== Geography ==
Tolstovsky is located 33 km southwest of Kamen-na-Obi (the district's administrative centre) by road. Tambovsky is the nearest rural locality.
