= Pushtulim =

Pushtulim Пуштулим
- Selo
- Location within Altai Krai Location within Russia
- Coordinates: 53°12′N 86°26′E
- Country: Russia
- Region: Altai Krai
- District: Yeltsovsky District
- Time zone: UTC+7:00

Pushtulim (Russian: Пуштулим) is a rural locality (a selo) and the administrative center of Pushtulimsky Selsoviet, Yeltsovsky District, Altai Krai, Russia. The population was 705 as of 2013. There are 14 streets.

== Geography ==
Pushtulim is located 16 km southeast of Yeltsovka (the district's administrative centre) by road. Kaltyk is the nearest rural locality.
