= Urozhayny =

Urozhayny Урожайный
- Settlement
- Location within Altai Krai Location within Russia
- Coordinates: 52°42′N 84°55′E
- Country: Russia
- Region: Altai Krai
- District: Zonalny District
- Time zone: UTC+7:00

Urozhayny (Russian: Урожайный) is a rural locality (a settlement) in Zonalny Selsoviet, Zonalny District, Altai Krai, Russia. The population was 187 as of 2013. There are 5 streets.

== Geography ==
Urozhayny is located 8 km north of Zonalnoye (the district's administrative centre) by road. Voskhod is the nearest rural locality.
