= Uksunay =

Uksunay Уксунай
- Selo
- Location within Altai Krai Location within Russia
- Coordinates: 53°29′N 86°00′E
- Country: Russia
- Region: Altai Krai
- District: Togulsky District
- Time zone: UTC+7:00

Uksunay (Russian: Уксунай) is a rural locality (a selo) in Starotogulsky Selsoviet, Togulsky District, Altai Krai, Russia. The population was 99 as of 2013. There are 8 streets.

== Geography ==
Uksunay is located on the Uksunay River, 15 km northeast of Togul (the district's administrative centre) by road. Lnozavod is the nearest rural locality.
