= Malovolchanka =

Malovolchanka Маловолчанка
- Selo
- Location within Altai Krai Location within Russia
- Coordinates: 54°04′N 80°54′E
- Country: Russia
- Region: Altai Krai
- District: Krutikhinsky District
- Time zone: UTC+7:00

Malovolchanka (Russian: Маловолчанка) is a rural locality (a selo) and the administrative center of Malovolchansky Selsoviet, Krutikhinsky District, Altai Krai, Russia. The population was 611 as of 2013. There are 5 streets.

== Geography ==
Malovolchanka is located 46 km northwest of Krutikha (the district's administrative centre) by road. Volchno-Burlinskoye is the nearest rural locality.
