= Mnogoozyorny =

Mnogoozyorny Многоозёрный
- Settlement
- Location within Altai Krai Location within Russia
- Coordinates: 52°44′N 84°22′E
- Country: Russia
- Region: Altai Krai
- District: Troitsky District
- Time zone: UTC+7:00

Mnogoozyorny (Russian: Многоозёрный) is a rural locality (a settlement) and the administrative center of Yuzhakovsky Selsoviet, Troitsky District, Altai Krai, Russia. The population was 380 as of 2013. It was founded in 1939. There are 16 streets.

== Geography ==
Mnogoozyorny is located 45 km southwest of Troitskoye (the district's administrative centre) by road. Yuzhakovo is the nearest rural locality.
