= Urozhayny, Pavlovsky District, Altai Krai =

Urozhayny Урожайный
- Settlement
- Location within Altai Krai Location within Russia
- Coordinates: 53°16′N 83°09′E
- Country: Russia
- Region: Altai Krai
- District: Pavlovsky District
- Time zone: UTC+7:00

Urozhayny (Russian: Урожайный) is a rural locality (a settlement) in Komsomolsky Selsoviet, Pavlovsky District, Altai Krai, Russia. The population was 463 as of 2013. There are 8 streets.

== Geography ==
Urozhayny is located 18 km southeast of Pavlovsk (the district's administrative centre) by road. Prutskoy is the nearest rural locality.
