= Martynovo, Altai Krai =

Martynovo Мартыново
- Selo
- Location within Altai Krai Location within Russia
- Coordinates: 53°15′N 85°54′E
- Country: Russia
- Region: Altai Krai
- District: Yeltsovsky District
- Time zone: UTC+7:00

Martynovo (Russian: Мартыново) is a rural locality (a selo) and the administrative center of Martynovsky Selsoviet, Yeltsovsky District, Altai Krai, Russia. The population was 1,252 as of 2013. There are 23 streets.

== Geography ==
Martynovo is located 29 km west of Yeltsovka (the district's administrative centre) by road. Bragino is the nearest rural locality.
