= Kryuchki =

Kryuchki Крючки
- Settlement
- Location within Altai Krai Location within Russia
- Coordinates: 50°50′N 81°47′E
- Country: Russia
- Region: Altai Krai
- District: Tretyakovsky District
- Time zone: UTC+7:00

Kryuchki (Russian: Крючки) is a rural locality (a settlement) in Tretyakovsky Selsoviet, Tretyakovsky District, Altai Krai, Russia. The population was 129 as of 2013. There are 3 streets.

== Geography ==
Kryuchki is located 28 km southwest of Staroaleyskoye (the district's administrative centre) by road. Tretyakovo is the nearest rural locality.
