= Komarikha =

Komarikha Комариха
- Village
- Location within Altai Krai Location within Russia
- Coordinates: 51°55′N 82°42′E
- Country: Russia
- Region: Altai Krai
- District: Shipunovsky District
- Time zone: UTC+7:00

Komarikha (Russian: Комариха) is a rural locality (a selo) and the administrative center of Komarikhinsky Selsoviet of Shipunovsky District, Altai Krai, Russia. The population was 1,001 in 2017. There are 9 streets.

== Geography ==
Komarikha is located 53 km southeast of Shipunovo (the district's administrative centre) by road. Tugozvonovo is the nearest rural locality.
