= Khmelyovka, Altai Krai =

Khmelyovka Хмелёвка
- Selo
- Location within Altai Krai Location within Russia
- Coordinates: 53°57′N 85°11′E
- Country: Russia
- Region: Altai Krai
- District: Zarinsky District
- Time zone: UTC+7:00

Khmelyovka (Russian: Хмелёвка) is a rural locality (a selo) and the administrative center of Khmelyovsky Selsoviet, Zarinsky District, Altai Krai, Russia. The population was 1,072 as of 2013. There are 16 streets.

== Geography ==
Khmelyovka is located 42 km northeast of Zarinsk (the district's administrative centre) by road. Novodresvyanka is the nearest rural locality.
