= Novorossiysky =

Novorossiysky Новороссийский
- Settlement
- Location within Altai Krai Location within Russia
- Coordinates: 51°50′N 81°22′E
- Country: Russia
- Region: Altai Krai
- District: Rubtsovsky District
- Time zone: UTC+7:00

Novorossiysky (Russian: Новороссийский) is a rural locality (a settlement) and the administrative center of Novorossiysky Selsoviet, Rubtsovsky District, Altai Krai, Russia. The population was 631 as of 2013. There are 6 streets.

== Geography ==
Novorossiysky is located 49 km north of Rubtsovsk (the district's administrative centre) by road. Aksyonovka is the nearest rural locality.
