= Komarikha, Topchikhinsky District, Altai Krai =

Komarikha Комариха
- Settlement
- Location within Altai Krai Location within Russia
- Coordinates: 52°43′N 82°38′E
- Country: Russia
- Region: Altai Krai
- District: Topchikhinsky District
- Time zone: UTC+7:00

Komarikha (Russian: Комариха) is a rural locality (a settlement) in Parfyonovsky Selsoviet, Topchikhinsky District, Altai Krai, Russia. The population was 61 as of 2013. There are 2 streets.

== Geography ==
Komarikha is located 43 km southwest of Topchikha (the district's administrative centre) by road. Kirovskoye is the nearest rural locality.
