= Poteryayevka, Rubtsovsky District, Altai Krai =

Poteryayevka Потеряевка
- Settlement
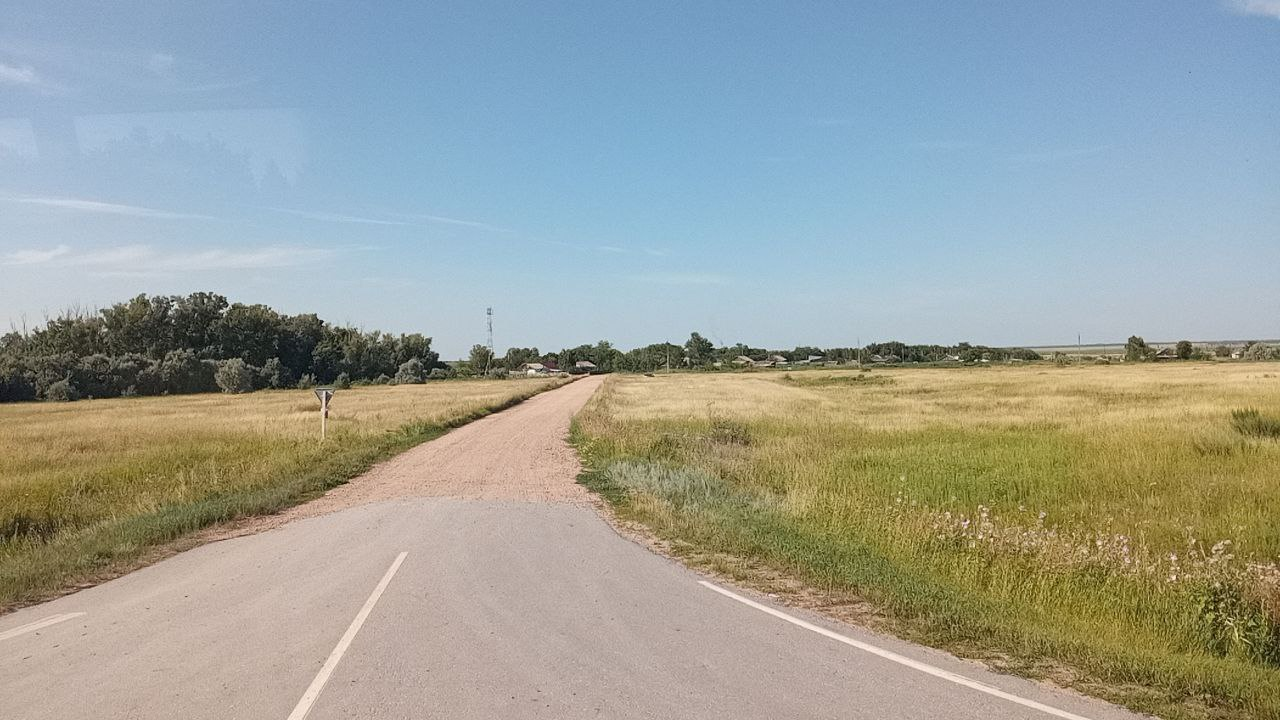
- Poteryaevka village

- Location within Altai Krai Location within Russia
- Coordinates: 51°27′N 81°29′E
- Country: Russia
- Region: Altai Krai
- District: Rubtsovsky District
- Time zone: UTC+7:00

Poteryayevka (Russian: Потеряевка) is a rural locality (a settlement) in Novosklyuikhinsky Selsoviet, Rubtsovsky District, Altai Krai, Russia. The population was 187 as of 2013. There are 5 streets.

== Geography ==
Poteryayevka is located 23 km east of Rubtsovsk (the district's administrative centre) by road. Romanovka is the nearest rural locality.
