= Krutishka =

Krutishka Крутишка
- Selo
- Location within Altai Krai Location within Russia
- Coordinates: 53°27′N 81°49′E
- Country: Russia
- Region: Altai Krai
- District: Shelabolikhinsky District
- Time zone: UTC+7:00

Krutishka (Russian: Крутишка) is a rural locality (a selo) and the administrative center of Krutishinsky Selsoviet, Shelabolikhinsky District, Altai Krai, Russia. The population was 1,046 as of 2013. There are 15 streets.

== Geography ==
Krutishka is located 58 km west of Shelabolikha (the district's administrative centre) by road. Chaykino is the nearest rural locality.
