= Yazevka-Sibirskaya =

Yazevka-Sibirskaya Язевка-Сибирская
- Station
- Location within Altai Krai Location within Russia
- Coordinates: 52°21′N 82°31′E
- Country: Russia
- Region: Altai Krai
- District: Aleysky District
- Time zone: UTC+7:00

Yazevka-Sibirskaya (Russian: Язевка-Сибирская) is a rural locality (a station) in Kashinsky Selsoviet, Aleysky District, Altai Krai, Russia. The population was 59 as of 2013. There are 4 streets.
