= Nechunayevo =

Nechunayevo Нечунаево
- Selo
- Location within Altai Krai Location within Russia
- Coordinates: 52°15′N 82°23′E
- Country: Russia
- Region: Altai Krai
- District: Shipunovsky District
- Time zone: UTC+7:00

Nechunayevo (Russian: Нечунаево) is a rural locality (a selo) and the administrative center of Nechunayevsky Selsoviet, Shipunovsky District, Altai Krai, Russia. The population was 788 as of 2013. There are 14 streets.

== Geography ==
Nechunayevo is located 19 km ENE of Shipunovo (the district's administrative centre) by road. Barchikha is the nearest rural locality.
