= Lugovoye, Kamensky District, Altai Krai =

Lugovoye Луговое
- Selo
- Location within Altai Krai Location within Russia
- Coordinates: 53°30′N 81°37′E
- Country: Russia
- Region: Altai Krai
- District: Kamensky District
- Time zone: UTC+7:00

Lugovoye (Russian: Луговое) is a rural locality (a selo) and the administrative center of Plotnikovsky Selsoviet, Kamensky District, Altai Krai, Russia. The population was 769 as of 2013. There are 17 streets.

== Geography ==
Lugovoye is located 39 km southeast of Kamen-na-Obi (the district's administrative centre) by road. Podgorny is the nearest rural locality.
