= Arbuzovka =

Arbuzovka Арбузовка
- Station
- Location within Altai Krai Location within Russia
- Coordinates: 53°05′N 82°54′E
- Country: Russia
- Region: Altai Krai
- District: Pavlovsky District
- Time zone: UTC+7:00

Arbuzovka (Russian: Арбузовка) is a rural locality (a station) and the administrative center of Arbuzovsky Selsoviet, Pavlovsky District, Altai Krai, Russia. The population was 868 as of 2013. There are 15 streets.

== Geography ==
Arbuzovka is located 35 km from Pavlovsk (the district's administrative centre) by road.
