= Ust-Kazha =

Ust-Kazha Усть-Кажа
- Selo
- Location within Altai Krai Location within Russia
- Coordinates: 52°10′N 85°57′E
- Country: Russia
- Region: Altai Krai
- District: Krasnogorsky District
- Time zone: UTC+7:00

Ust-Kazha (Russian: Усть-Кажа) is a rural locality (a selo) and the administrative center of Ust-Kazhinsky Selsoviet, Krasnogorsky District, Altai Krai, Russia. The population was 697 as of 2013. There are 16 streets.

== Geography ==
Ust-Kazha is located 37 km north of Krasnogorskoye (the district's administrative centre) by road. Novaya Azhinka is the nearest rural locality.
