= Ust-Talovka =

Ust-Talovka Усть-Таловка
- Selo
- Location within Altai Krai Location within Russia
- Coordinates: 51°29′N 82°17′E
- Country: Russia
- Region: Altai Krai
- District: Kuryinsky District
- Time zone: UTC+7:00

Ust-Talovka (Russian: Усть-Таловка) is a rural locality (a selo) and the administrative center of Ust-Talovsky Selsoviet, Kuryinsky District, Altai Krai, Russia. The population was 948 as of 2013. There are 8 streets.

== Geography ==
Ust-Talovka is located 19 km south of Kurya (the district's administrative centre) by road. Kurya and Ruchyovo are the nearest rural localities.
