= Novokopylovo =

Novokopylovo Новокопылово
- Selo
- Location within Altai Krai Location within Russia
- Coordinates: 53°40′N 84°44′E
- Country: Russia
- Region: Altai Krai
- District: Zarinsky District
- Time zone: UTC+7:00

Novokopylovo (Russian: Новокопылово) is a rural locality (a selo) and the administrative center of Novokopylovsky Selsoviet, Zarinsky District, Altai Krai, Russia. The population was 840 as of 2013. There are 8 streets.

== Geography ==
Novokopylovo is located 19 km southwest of Zarinsk (the district's administrative centre) by road. Smirnovo is the nearest rural locality.
