= Novoalexandrovka, Altai Krai =

Novoalexandrovka Новоалександровка
- Selo
- Location within Altai Krai Location within Russia
- Coordinates: 51°22′N 81°10′E
- Country: Russia
- Region: Altai Krai
- District: Rubtsovsky District
- Time zone: UTC+7:00

Novoalexandrovka (Russian: Новоалександровка) is a rural locality (a selo) and the administrative center of Novoalexandrovsky Selsoviet, Rubtsovsky District, Altai Krai, Russia. The population was 877 as of 2013. There are 6 streets.

== Geography ==
Novoalexandrovka is located 20 km south of Rubtsovsk (the district's administrative centre) by road. Kolos is the nearest rural locality.
