= Bobkovo =

Bobkovo Бобково
- Selo
- Location within Altai Krai Location within Russia
- Coordinates: 51°40′N 81°23′E
- Country: Russia
- Region: Altai Krai
- District: Rubtsovsky District
- Time zone: UTC+7:00

Bobkovo (Russian: Бобково) is a rural locality (a selo) and the administrative center of Bobkovsky Selsoviet, Rubtsovsky District, Altai Krai, Russia. The population was 911 as of 2013. There are 15 streets.

== Geography ==
Bobkovo is located 29 km northeast of Rubtsovsk (the district's administrative centre) by road. Katkovo is the nearest rural locality.
