= Tugozvonovo =

Tugozvonovo Тугозвоново
- Selo
- Location within Altai Krai Location within Russia
- Coordinates: 52°04′N 82°35′E
- Country: Russia
- Region: Altai Krai
- District: Shipunovsky District
- Time zone: UTC+7:00

Tugozvonovo (Russian: Тугозвоново) is a rural locality (a selo) and the administrative center of Tugozvonovsky Selsoviet, Shipunovsky District, Altai Krai, Russia. The population was 1,156 as of 2013. It was founded in 1735. There are 20 streets.

== Geography ==
Tugozvonovo is located 37 km southeast of Shipunovo (the district's administrative centre) by road. Novoselskoye is the nearest rural locality.
