= Novoobintsevo =

Novoobintsevo Новообинцево
- Selo
- Location within Altai Krai Location within Russia
- Coordinates: 53°24′N 82°42′E
- Country: Russia
- Region: Altai Krai
- District: Shelabolikhinsky District
- Time zone: UTC+7:00

Novoobintsevo (Russian: Новообинцево) is a rural locality (a selo) and the administrative center of Novoobintsevsky Selsoviet, Shelabolikhinsky District, Altai Krai, Russia. The population was 935 as of 2013. There are 6 streets.

== Geography ==
Novoobintsevo is located 11 km east of Shelabolikha (the district's administrative centre) by road. Malinovka is the nearest rural locality.
