= Shatalovka, Altai Krai =

Shatalovka Шаталовка
- Selo
- Location within Altai Krai Location within Russia
- Coordinates: 52°24′N 79°57′E
- Country: Russia
- Region: Altai Krai
- District: Rodinsky District
- Time zone: UTC+7:00

Shatalovka (Russian: Шаталовка) is a rural locality (a selo) and the administrative center of Shatalovsky Selsoviet, Rodinsky District, Altai Krai, Russia. The population was 619 as of 2013. There are 8 streets.

== Geography ==
Shatalovka is located 22 km southwest of Rodino (the district's administrative centre) by road. Zelyony Lug is the nearest rural locality.
