= Novouvalsky =

Novouvalsky Новоувальский
- Settlement
- Location within Altai Krai Location within Russia
- Coordinates: 53°51′N 81°16′E
- Country: Russia
- Region: Altai Krai
- District: Krutikhinsky District
- Time zone: UTC+7:00

Novouvalsky (Russian: Новоувальский) is a rural locality (a settlement) in Zakovryashinsky Selsoviet, Krutikhinsky District, Altai Krai, Russia. The population was 18 as of 2013. There are 2 streets.

== Geography ==
Novouvalsky is located 20 km south of Krutikha (the district's administrative centre) by road. Karasi and Dresvyanka are the nearest rural localities.
