= Baygamut =

Baygamut Байгамут
- Settlement
- Location within Altai Krai Location within Russia
- Coordinates: 52°38′N 79°42′E
- Country: Russia
- Region: Altai Krai
- District: Blagoveshchensky District
- Time zone: UTC+7:00

Baygamut (Russian: Байгамут) is a rural locality (a settlement) in Orleansky Selsoviet, Blagoveshchensky District, Altai Krai, Russia. The population was 86 as of 2013. It was founded in 1728. There are 3 streets.

== Geography ==
Baygamut is located 40 km southwest of Blagoveshchenka (the district's administrative centre) by road. Orlean is the nearest rural locality.
