= Goryushino =

Goryushino Горюшино
- Selo
- Location within Altai Krai Location within Russia
- Coordinates: 53°53′N 85°20′E
- Country: Russia
- Region: Altai Krai
- District: Zarinsky District
- Time zone: UTC+7:00

Goryushino (Russian: Горюшино) is a rural locality (a selo) in Sosnovsky Selsoviet, Zarinsky District, Altai Krai, Russia. The population was 8 as of 2013. There is 1 street.

== Geography ==
Goryushino is located on the Stepnoy Alambay River, 46 km northeast of Zarinsk (the district's administrative centre) by road. Sosnovka is the nearest rural locality.
