= Yeltsovka, Troitsky District, Altai Krai =

Yeltsovka Ельцовка
- Selo
- Location within Altai Krai Location within Russia
- Coordinates: 53°03′N 85°07′E
- Country: Russia
- Region: Altai Krai
- District: Troitsky District
- Time zone: UTC+7:00

Yeltsovka (Russian: Ельцовка) is a rural locality (a selo) and the administrative center of Khayryuzovsky Selsoviet, Troitsky District, Altai Krai, Russia. The population was 646 as of 2013. There are 4 streets.

== Geography ==
It is located 110 km south-east from Barnaul, on the Yeltsovka River.
