= Yanovo, Altai Krai =

Yanovo Яново
- Selo
- Location within Altai Krai Location within Russia
- Coordinates: 53°53′N 85°12′E
- Country: Russia
- Region: Altai Krai
- District: Zarinsky District
- Time zone: UTC+7:00

Yanovo (Russian: Яново) is a rural locality (a selo) and the administrative center of Yanovsky Selsoviet, Zarinsky District, Altai Krai, Russia. The population was 452 as of 2013. There are 9 streets.

== Geography ==
Yanovo is located 41 km northeast of Zarinsk (the district's administrative centre) by road. Kamenushka is the nearest rural locality.
