= Krestyanka =

Krestyanka Крестьянка
- Selo
- Location within Altai Krai Location within Russia
- Coordinates: 52°25′N 81°35′E
- Country: Russia
- Region: Altai Krai
- District: Mamontovsky District
- Time zone: UTC+7:00

Krestyanka (Russian: Крестьянка) is a rural locality (a selo) and the administrative center of Krestyansky Selsoviet, Mamontovsky District, Altai Krai, Russia. The population was 1,219 as of 2013. There are 16 streets.

== Geography ==
Krestyanka is located 50 km south of Mamontovo (the district's administrative centre) by road. Korobeynikovo is the nearest rural locality.
