= Shulgin Log =

Shulgin Log Шульгин Лог
- Selo
- Location within Altai Krai Location within Russia
- Coordinates: 52°09′N 85°51′E
- Country: Russia
- Region: Altai Krai
- District: Sovetsky District
- Time zone: UTC+7:00

Shulgin Log (Russian: Шульгин Лог) is a rural locality (a selo) in Shulgin-Logsky Selsoviet, Sovetsky District, Altai Krai, Russia. The population was 856 as of 2013. There are 6 streets.

== Geography ==
Shulgin Log is located on the Katun River, 45 km southeast of Sovetskoye (the district's administrative centre) by road. Ust-Isha is the nearest rural locality.
