= Bolshaya Rechka, Altai Krai =

Bolshaya Rechka Большая Речка
- Selo
- Location within Altai Krai Location within Russia
- Coordinates: 53°01′N 84°47′E
- Country: Russia
- Region: Altai Krai
- District: Troitsky District
- Time zone: UTC+7:00

Bolshaya Rechka (Russian: Большая Речка) is a rural locality (a selo) in Petrovsky Selsoviet, Troitsky District, Altai Krai, Russia. The population was 181 as of 2013. It was founded in 1857.There are 4 streets.

== Geography ==
Bolshaya Rechka is located 11 km northeast of Troitskoye (the district's administrative centre) by road. Troitskoye is the nearest rural locality.
