= Vorobyovo, Altai Krai =

Vorobyovo Воробьёво
- Settlement
- Location within Altai Krai Location within Russia
- Coordinates: 52°03′N 82°58′E
- Country: Russia
- Region: Altai Krai
- District: Shipunovsky District
- Time zone: UTC+7:00

Vorobyovo (Russian: Воробьёво) is a rural locality (a settlement) in Voykovsky Selsoviet, Shipunovsky District, Altai Krai, Russia. The population was 198 as of 2013. There are 4 streets.

== Geography ==
Vorobyovo is located 64 km southeast of Shipunovo (the district's administrative centre) by road. Kosobokovo is the nearest rural locality.
