= Zelyonaya Roshcha, Slavgorod, Altai Krai =

Zelyonaya Roshcha Зелёная Роща
- Selo
- Location within Altai Krai Location within Russia
- Coordinates: 53°11′N 79°06′E
- Country: Russia
- Region: Altai Krai
- District: Slavgorod
- Time zone: UTC+7:00

Zelyonaya Roshcha (Russian: Зелёная Роща) is a rural locality (a selo) in Slavgorod, Altai Krai, Russia. The population was 3 in 2013. There are two streets.
