= Gilyovka =

Gilyovka Гилёвка
- Selo
- Location within Altai Krai Location within Russia
- Coordinates: 52°51′N 81°06′E
- Country: Russia
- Region: Altai Krai
- District: Zavyalovsky District
- Time zone: UTC+7:00

Gilyovka (Russian: Гилёвка) is a rural locality (a selo) and the administrative center of Gilyovsky Selsoviet of Zavyalovsky District, Altai Krai, Russia. The population was 1232 as of 2016. There are 19 streets.

== Geography ==
Gilyovka is located 22 km northeast of Zavyalovo (the district's administrative centre) by road. Dobraya Volya is the nearest rural locality.
