= Selektsionnoye, Altai Krai =

Selektsionnoye Селекционное
- Selo
- Location within Altai Krai Location within Russia
- Coordinates: 52°58′N 78°35′E
- Country: Russia
- Region: Altai Krai
- District: Slavgorod
- Time zone: UTC+7:00

Selektsionnoye (Russian: Селекционное) is a rural locality (a selo) in Slavgorod, Altai Krai, Russia. The population was 1,214 as of 2013. There are 15 streets.
