= Zavodskoye, Altai Krai =

Village in Altai Krai, Russia

Coordinates: 52°49′47″N 84°42′45″E

Zavodskoye (Russian: Заводско́е) is a village (selo) in Troitsky District of Altai Krai, Russia.

It is situated at an altitude of 258 metres. The latitude and longitude of Zavodskoye are 53.06949° and 84.42251° respectively.

Zavodskoye is located in the time zone Krasnoyarsk Standard Time of UTC +7. Its postal code is 659831.

The population of Zavodskoye is 1,330.
