= Panovka =

Panovka Пановка
- Selo
- Location within Altai Krai Location within Russia
- Coordinates: 53°15′N 79°35′E
- Country: Russia
- Region: Altai Krai
- District: Slavgorod
- Time zone: UTC+7:00

Panovka (Russian: Пановка) is a rural locality (a selo) in Slavgorod, Altai Krai, Russia. The population was 125 as of 2013. There are 3 streets.
