= Ustyanka =

Ustyanka Устьянка
- Village
- Location within Altai Krai Location within Russia
- Coordinates: 51°08′N 81°35′E
- Country: Russia
- Region: Altai Krai
- District: Loktevsky District
- Time zone: UTC+7:00

Ustyanka (Russian: Устьянка) is a rural locality (a selo) and the administrative center of Ustyanovsky Selsoviet of Loktevsky District, Altai Krai, Russia. The population was 841 in 2016. There are 11 streets.

== Geography ==
Ustyanka is located 27 km north of Gornyak (the district's administrative centre) by road. Georgiyevka is the nearest rural locality.
