= Samarka =

Samarka Самарка
- Selo
- Location within Altai Krai Location within Russia
- Coordinates: 50°54′N 81°32′E
- Country: Russia
- Region: Altai Krai
- District: Loktevsky District
- Time zone: UTC+7:00

Samarka (Russian: Самарка) is a rural locality (a selo) and the administrative center of Samarsky Selsoviet of Loktevsky District, Altai Krai, Russia. The population was 590 as of 2016. There are 4 streets.

== Geography ==
Samarka is located in the valley of the Zolotukha River, 14 km southeast of Gornyak (the district's administrative centre) by road. Uspenka is the nearest rural locality.

== Ethnicity ==
The village is inhabited by Russians, Germans and others.
