= Kosobokovo =

Kosobokovo Кособоково
- Selo
- Location within Altai Krai Location within Russia
- Coordinates: 52°03′N 82°51′E
- Country: Russia
- Region: Altai Krai
- District: Shipunovsky District
- Time zone: UTC+7:00

Kosobokovo (Russian: Кособоково) is a rural locality (a selo) in Voykovsky Selsoviet, Shipunovsky District, Altai Krai, Russia. The population was 333 as of 2013. There are 9 streets.

== Geography ==
Kosobokovo is located 61 km southeast of Shipunovo (the district's administrative centre) by road. Vorobyovo is the nearest rural locality.
