= Sibirka, Altai Krai =

Sibirka Сибирка
- Selo
- Location within Altai Krai Location within Russia
- Coordinates: 53°26′N 82°29′E
- Country: Russia
- Region: Altai Krai
- District: Shelabolikhinsky District
- Time zone: UTC+7:00

Sibirka (Russian: Сибирка) is a rural locality (a selo) in Kuchuksky Selsoviet, Shelabolikhinsky District, Altai Krai, Russia. The population was 71 as of 2013. There is 1 street.

== Geography ==
Sibirka is located on the Ob River, 17 km northwest of Shelabolikha (the district's administrative centre) by road. Kuchuk is the nearest rural locality.
