= Bor-Forpost =

Bor-Forpost Бор-Форпост
- Village
- Location within Altai Krai Location within Russia
- Coordinates: 51°52′32″N 80°06′54″E
- Country: Russia
- Region: Altai Krai
- District: Volchikhinsky District
- Time zone: UTC+7:00

Bor-Forpost (Russian: Бор-Форпост) is a rural locality (a selo) and the administrative center of Bor-Forpostovsky Selsoviet of Volchikhinsky District, Altai Krai, Russia. The population was 843 as of 2016. It was founded in 1656. There are 12 streets.

== Geography ==
Bor-Forpost is located 25 km southwest of Volchikha (the district's administrative centre) by road. Ust-Volchikha is the nearest rural locality.

== Ethnicity ==
The village is inhabited by Russians and others.
