= Naumovka, Altai Krai =

Naumovka Наумовка
- Selo
- Location within Altai Krai Location within Russia
- Coordinates: 51°01′N 80°26′E
- Country: Russia
- Region: Altai Krai
- District: Uglovsky District
- Time zone: UTC+7:00

Naumovka (Russian: Наумовка) is a rural locality (a selo) in Laptevsky Selsoviet, Uglovsky District, Altai Krai, Russia. The population was 305 as of 2013. It was founded in 1912. There are 9 streets.

== Geography ==
Naumovka is located 75 km south of Uglovskoye (the district's administrative centre) by road. Laptev Log is the nearest rural locality.
