= Kusak =

Kusak Кусак
- Selo
- Location within Altai Krai Location within Russia
- Coordinates: 53°13′N 78°56′E
- Country: Russia
- Region: Altai Krai
- District: Nemetsky National District
- Time zone: UTC+7:00

Kusak (Russian: Кусак) is a rural locality (a selo) in Nemetsky National District, Altai Krai, Russia. The population was 1,538 as of 2013. There are 6 streets.

== Geography ==
Kusak is located 5 km west of Galbshtadt (the district's administrative centre) by road. Galbshtadt is the nearest rural locality.
