= Novomonoshkino =

Novomonoshkino Новомоношкино
- Selo
- Location within Altai Krai Location within Russia
- Coordinates: 53°36′N 84°29′E
- Country: Russia
- Region: Altai Krai
- District: Zarinsky District
- Time zone: UTC+7:00

Novomonoshkino (Russian: Новомоношкино) is a rural locality (a selo) and the administrative center of Novomonoshkinsky Selsoviet, Zarinsky District, Altai Krai, Russia. The population was 1,045 as of 2013. There are 17 streets.

== Geography ==
Novomonoshkino is located 53 km northeast of Zarinsk (the district's administrative centre) by road. Khmelyovka is the nearest rural locality.
