= Plotava, Bayevsky District, Altai Krai =

Plotava Плотава
- Selo
- Location within Altai Krai Location within Russia
- Coordinates: 53°27′N 80°43′E
- Country: Russia
- Region: Altai Krai
- District: Bayevsky District
- Time zone: UTC+7:00

Plotava (Russian: Плотава) is a rural locality (a selo) and the administrative center of Plotavsky Selsoviet, Bayevsky District, Altai Krai, Russia. The population was 717 as of 2013. There are 11 streets.

== Geography ==
Plotava is located 23 km north of Bayevo (the district's administrative centre) by road. Verkh-Chumanka is the nearest rural locality.
