= Gonba =

Gonba Гоньба
- Selo
- Location within Altai Krai Location within Russia
- Coordinates: 53°24′N 83°34′E
- Country: Russia
- Region: Altai Krai
- District: Barnaul
- Time zone: UTC+7:00

Gonba (Russian: Гоньба) is a rural locality (a selo) in Barnaul, Altai Krai, Russia. The population was 2,993 as of 2013. There are 29 streets.

== Geography ==
Gonba is located 19 km northwest of Barnaul by road. Zemlyanukha is the nearest rural locality.
