= Pravda, Pervomaysky District, Altai Krai =

Pravda Правда
- Settlement
- Location within Altai Krai Location within Russia
- Coordinates: 53°26′N 84°07′E
- Country: Russia
- Region: Altai Krai
- District: Pervomaysky District
- Time zone: UTC+7:00

Pravda (Russian: Правда) is a rural locality (a settlement) in Beryozovsky Selsoviet, Pervomaysky District, Altai Krai, Russia. The population was 447 as of 2013. There are 6 streets.

== Geography ==
Pravda is located 17 km east of Novoaltaysk (the district's administrative centre) by road. Beryozovka is the nearest rural locality.
