= Pamyat Kommunarov =

Pamyat Kommunarov Память Коммунаров
- Settlement
- Location within Altai Krai Location within Russia
- Coordinates: 52°43′N 81°17′E
- Country: Russia
- Region: Altai Krai
- District: Romanovsky District
- Time zone: UTC+7:00

Pamyat Kommunarov (Russian: Память Коммунаров) is a rural locality (a settlement) in Maysky Selsoviet, Romanovsky District, Altai Krai, Russia. The population was 27 as of 2013. There is 1 street.

== Geography ==
Pamyat Kommunarov is located 17 km north of Romanovo (the district's administrative centre) by road. Maysky is the nearest rural locality.
