= Zheleznodorozhnaya Kazarma 193 km =

Zheleznodorozhnaya Kazarma 193 km Железнодорожная Казарма 193 км
- Station
- Location within Altai Krai Location within Russia
- Coordinates: 53°32′N 83°47′E
- Country: Russia
- Region: Altai Krai
- District: Pervomaysky District
- Time zone: UTC+7:00

Zheleznodorozhnaya Kazarma 193 km (Russian: Железнодорожная Казарма 193 км) is a rural locality (a station) in Sibirsky Selsoviet, Pervomaysky District, Altai Krai, Russia. The population was 33 as of 2013. There is 1 street.

== Geography ==
The station is located 23 km from Novoaltaysk, 51 km from Barnaul.
