= Ust-Anuy =

Ust-Anuy Усть-Ануй
- Village
- Location within Altai Krai Location within Russia
- Coordinates: 52°23′N 84°45′E
- Country: Russia
- Region: Altai Krai
- District: Bystroistoksky District
- Time zone: UTC+7:00

Ust-Anuy (Russian: Усть-Ануй) is a rural locality (a selo) and the administrative center of Ust-Anuysky Selsoviet of Bystroistoksky District, Altai Krai, Russia. The population was 262 as of 2016. There are 3 streets.

== Geography ==
Ust-Anuy is located at the mouth of the Anuy river, 32 km east of Bystry Istok (the district's administrative centre) by road. Starotaryshkino is the nearest rural locality.

== Ethnicity ==
The village is inhabited by Russians and others.
