= Ust-Katun =

Ust-Katun Усть-Катунь
- Settlement
- Location within Altai Krai Location within Russia
- Coordinates: 52°27′N 85°10′E
- Country: Russia
- Region: Altai Krai
- District: Biysky District
- Time zone: UTC+7:00

Ust-Katun (Russian: Усть-Катунь) is a rural locality (a settlement) in Biysky District, Altai Krai, Russia. The population was 449 as of 2013. There are 11 streets. The postal code for the city is 659374.

== Geography ==
Ust-Katun is located 13 km southwest of Biysk (the district's administrative centre) by road. Biysk is the nearest rural locality.

The highest altitude is 171 meters ( 561 ft. ) and it has a humid continental climate.
