= Novaya Mikhaylovka, Altai Krai =

Novaya Mikhaylovka Новая Михайловка
- Selo
- Location within Altai Krai Location within Russia
- Coordinates: 52°39′N 84°51′E
- Country: Russia
- Region: Altai Krai
- District: Zonalny District
- Time zone: UTC+7:00

Novaya Mikhaylovka (Russian: Новая Михайловка) is a rural locality (a selo) in Zonalny Selsoviet, Zonalny District, Altai Krai, Russia. The population was 304 as of 2013. There are 4 streets.

== Geography ==
Novaya Mikhaylovka is located on the Biysko-Chumyshskaya plain, 6 km west of Zonalnoye (the district's administrative centre) by road. Zonalnoye is the nearest rural locality.
