= Tundrikha =

Tundrikha Тундриха
- Selo
- Location within Altai Krai Location within Russia
- Coordinates: 53°59′N 84°32′E
- Country: Russia
- Region: Altai Krai
- District: Zalesovsky District
- Time zone: UTC+7:00

Tundrikha (Russian: Тундриха) is a rural locality (a selo) and the administrative center of Tundrikhinsky Selsoviet, Zalesovsky District, Altai Krai, Russia. The population was 441 as of 2013. There are 6 streets.

== Geography ==
Tundrikha is located 15 km west of Zalesovo (the district's administrative centre) by road. Zaplyvino is the nearest rural locality.
