= Kalinovka, Zalesovsky District, Altai Krai =

Kalinovka Калиновка
- Settlement
- Location within Altai Krai Location within Russia
- Coordinates: 53°51′N 84°33′E
- Country: Russia
- Region: Altai Krai
- District: Zalesovsky District
- Time zone: UTC+7:00

Kalinovka (Russian: Калиновка) is a rural locality (a settlement) in Shatunovsky Selsoviet, Zalesovsky District, Altai Krai, Russia. The population was 34 as of 2013. There are 2 streets.

== Geography ==
Kalinovka is located 30 km southwest of Zalesovo (the district's administrative centre) by road. Shatunovo is the nearest rural locality.
