= Osinovsky =

Osinovsky Осиновский
- Settlement
- Location within Altai Krai Location within Russia
- Coordinates: 53°15′N 80°01′E
- Country: Russia
- Region: Altai Krai
- District: Suyetsky District
- Time zone: UTC+7:00

Osinovsky (Russian: Осиновский) is a rural locality (a settlement) in Verkh-Suyetsky Selsoviet, Suyetsky District, Altai Krai, Russia. The population was 114 as of 2013. There are 7 streets.

== Geography ==
Osinovsky is located 6 km southwest of Verkh-Suyetka (the district's administrative centre) by road. Beregovoy is the nearest rural locality.
