= Kalmatsky =

Kalmatsky Калмацкий
- Settlement
- Location within Altai Krai Location within Russia
- Coordinates: 51°44′N 82°27′E
- Country: Russia
- Region: Altai Krai
- District: Kuryinsky District
- Time zone: UTC+7:00

Kalmatsky (Russian: Калмацкий) is a rural locality (a settlement) in Trusovsky Selsoviet, Kuryinsky District, Altai Krai, Russia. The population was 82 as of 2013. There is 1 street.

== Geography ==
Kalmatsky is located 24 km northeast of Kurya (the district's administrative centre) by road. Trusovo is the nearest rural locality.
