= Glyaden-2 =

Glyaden-2 Глядень-2
- Selo
- Location within Altai Krai Location within Russia
- Coordinates: 52°47′N 80°16′E
- Country: Russia
- Region: Altai Krai
- District: Blagoveshchensky District
- Time zone: UTC+7:00

Glyaden-2 (Russian: Глядень-2) is a rural locality (a selo) in Blagoveshchensky District, Altai Krai, Russia. The population was 278 as of 2013. There are 2 streets.

== Geography ==
Glyaden-2 is located 41 km east of Blagoveshchenka (the district's administrative centre) by road. Glyaden is the nearest rural locality.
