= Zhernovtsy =

Zhernovtsy Жерновцы
- Settlement
- Location within Altai Krai Location within Russia
- Coordinates: 51°56′N 81°04′E
- Country: Russia
- Region: Altai Krai
- District: Yegoryevsky District
- Time zone: UTC+7:00

Zhernovtsy (Russian: Жерновцы) is a rural locality (a settlement) in Srostinsky Selsoviet, Yegoryevsky District, Altai Krai, Russia. The population was 50 as of 2013.

== Geography ==
Zhernovtsy is located 28 km northeast of Novoyegoryevskoye (the district's administrative centre) by road. Srosty is the nearest rural locality.
