= Krasnoznamenka =

Krasnoznamenka Краснознаменка
- Selo
- Location within Altai Krai Location within Russia
- Coordinates: 51°41′N 82°16′E
- Country: Russia
- Region: Altai Krai
- District: Kuryinsky District
- Time zone: UTC+7:00

Krasnoznamenka (Russian: Краснознаменка) is a rural locality (a selo) in and the administrative center of Krasnoznamensky Selsoviet, Kuryinsky District, Altai Krai, Russia. The population was 904 as of 2013. There are 14 streets.

== Geography ==
Krasnoznamenka is located 13 km north of Kurya (the district's administrative centre) by road. Novoznamenka is the nearest rural locality.
