= Antoshikha =

Antoshikha Антошиха
- Selo
- Location within Altai Krai Location within Russia
- Coordinates: 50°53′N 81°47′E
- Country: Russia
- Region: Altai Krai
- District: Loktevsky District
- Time zone: UTC+7:00

Antoshikha (Russian: Антошиха) is a rural locality (a selo) in Masalsky Selsoviet, Loktevsky District, Altai Krai, Russia. The population was 106 as of 2013. There are 2 streets.

== Geography ==
Antoshikha is located on the Paseka River, 35 km southeast of Gornyak (the district's administrative centre) by road. Kryuchki and Masalsky are the nearest rural localities.
