= Poperechnoye, Khabarsky District, Altai Krai =

Poperechnoye Поперечное
- Settlement
- Location within Altai Krai Location within Russia
- Coordinates: 53°28′N 79°50′E
- Country: Russia
- Region: Altai Krai
- District: Khabarsky District
- Time zone: UTC+7:00

Poperechnoye (Russian: Поперечное) is a rural locality (a settlement) in Zyatkovo-Rechensky Selsoviet, Khabarsky District, Altai Krai, Russia. The population was 156 as of 2013. It was founded in 1914. There is 1 street.

== Geography ==
Poperechnoye is located 37 km southeast of Khabary (the district's administrative centre) by road. Michurinskoye is the nearest rural locality.
