= Yasnaya Polyana, Shipunovsky District, Altai Krai =

Yasnaya Polyana Ясная Поляна
- Settlement
- Location within Altai Krai Location within Russia
- Coordinates: 52°06′N 82°32′E
- Country: Russia
- Region: Altai Krai
- District: Shipunovsky District
- Time zone: UTC+7:00

Yasnaya Polyana (Russian: Ясная Поляна) is a rural locality (a settlement) in Beloglazovsky Selsoviet, Shipunovsky District, Altai Krai, Russia. The population was 326 as of 2013. There are 6 streets.

== Geography ==
Yasnaya Polyana is located 29 km southeast of Shipunovo (the district's administrative centre) by road. Beloglazovo is the nearest rural locality.
