= Cheryomnoye =

Cheryomnoye Черёмное
- Selo
- Location within Altai Krai Location within Russia
- Coordinates: 53°10′N 83°13′E
- Country: Russia
- Region: Altai Krai
- District: Pavlovsky District
- Time zone: UTC+7:00

Cheryomnoye (Russian: Черёмное) is a rural locality (a selo) and the administrative center of Cheryomnovsky Selsoviet, Pavlovsky District, Altai Krai, Russia. The population was 4,624 as of 2013. There are 31 streets.

== Geography ==
Cheryomnoye is located 36 km southeast of Pavlovsk (the district's administrative centre) by road. Sarai is the nearest rural locality.
