= Ust-Kamyshenka =

Ust-Kamyshenka Усть-Камышенка
- Selo
- Location within Altai Krai Location within Russia
- Coordinates: 52°03′N 83°11′E
- Country: Russia
- Region: Altai Krai
- District: Ust-Kalmansky District
- Time zone: UTC+7:00

Ust-Kamyshenka (Russian: Усть-Камышенка) is a rural locality (a selo) in Kabanovsky Selsoviet, Ust-Kalmansky District, Altai Krai, Russia. The population was 344 as of 2013. There are 9 streets.

== Geography ==
Ust-Kamyshenka is located 17 km southwest of Ust-Kalmanka (the district's administrative centre) by road. Ponomarevo is the nearest rural locality.
