= Trusovo, Altai Krai =

Trusovo Трусово
- Selo
- Location within Altai Krai Location within Russia
- Coordinates: 51°42′N 82°29′E
- Country: Russia
- Region: Altai Krai
- District: Kuryinsky District
- Time zone: UTC+7:00

Trusovo (Russian: Трусово) is a rural locality (a selo) and the administrative center of Trusovsky Selsoviet, Kuryinsky District, Altai Krai, Russia. The population was 607 as of 2013. There are 13 streets.

== Geography ==
Trusovo is located 20 km northeast of Kurya (the district's administrative centre) by road. Kalmatsky is the nearest rural locality.
