= Solonovka, Pavlovsky District, Altai Krai =

Solonovka Солоновка
- Selo
- Location within Altai Krai Location within Russia
- Coordinates: 53°08′N 83°10′E
- Country: Russia
- Region: Altai Krai
- District: Pavlovsky District
- Time zone: UTC+7:00

Solonovka (Russian: Солоновка) is a rural locality (a selo) in Cheryomnovsky Selsoviet, Pavlovsky District, Altai Krai, Russia. The population was 160 as of 2013. There are 3 streets.

== Geography ==
Solonovka is located 41 km southeast of Pavlovsk (the district's administrative centre) by road. Cheryomnoye is the nearest rural locality.
