= Makaryevka, Topchikhinsky District, Altai Krai =

Makaryevka Макарьевка
- Selo
- Location within Altai Krai Location within Russia
- Coordinates: 52°52′N 83°02′E
- Country: Russia
- Region: Altai Krai
- District: Topchikhinsky District
- Time zone: UTC+7:00

Makaryevka (Russian: Макарьевка) is a rural locality (a selo) and the administrative center of Makaryevsky Selsoviet, Topchikhinsky District, Altai Krai, Russia. The population was 482 as of 2013. There are 10 streets.

== Geography ==
Makaryevka is located 8 km northwest of Topchikha (the district's administrative centre) by road. Mikhaylovka is the nearest rural locality.
