= Novopovalikha =

Novopovalikha Новоповалиха
- Selo
- Location within Altai Krai Location within Russia
- Coordinates: 53°43′N 84°05′E
- Country: Russia
- Region: Altai Krai
- District: Pervomaysky District
- Time zone: UTC+7:00

Novopovalikha (Russian: Новоповалиха) is a rural locality (a selo) in Pervomaysky Selsoviet, Pervomaysky District, Altai Krai, Russia. The population was 342 as of 2013. There are 6 streets.

== Geography ==
Novopovalikha is located 49 km north of Novoaltaysk (the district's administrative centre) by road. Pervomayskoye is the nearest rural locality.
