= Novomikhaylovka, Barnaul, Altai Krai =

Novomikhaylovka Новомихайловка
- Settlement
- Location within Altai Krai Location within Russia
- Coordinates: 53°20′N 83°28′E
- Country: Russia
- Region: Altai Krai
- District: Barnaul
- Time zone: UTC+7:00

Novomikhaylovka (Russian: Новомихайловка) is a rural locality (a settlement) in Barnaul, Altai Krai, Russia. The population was 1,304 as of 2013. There are 21 streets.

== Geography ==
Novomikhaylovka is located 22 km west of Barnaul by road. Aviator is the nearest rural locality.
