= Baturovo =

Baturovo Батурово
- Selo
- Location within Altai Krai Location within Russia
- Coordinates: 53°25′N 82°23′E
- Country: Russia
- Region: Altai Krai
- District: Shelabolikhinsky District
- Time zone: UTC+7:00

Baturovo (Russian: Батурово) is a rural locality (a selo) in Kuchuksky Selsoviet, Shelabolikhinsky District, Altai Krai, Russia. The population was 414 as of 2013. There are 8 streets.

== Geography ==
Baturovo is located 17 km west of Shelabolikha (the district's administrative centre) by road. Kuchuk is the nearest rural locality.
