= Zhavoronkovo =

Zhavoronkovo Жаворонково
- Selo
- Location within Altai Krai Location within Russia
- Coordinates: 52°30′N 84°53′E
- Country: Russia
- Region: Altai Krai
- District: Biysk
- Time zone: UTC+7:00

Zhavoronkovo (Russian: Жаворонково) is a rural locality (a selo) in Biysk, Altai Krai, Russia. The population was 113 as of 2013. There are 13 streets.

== Geography ==
Zhavoronkovo is located 38 km west of Biysk (the district's administrative centre) by road. Savinovo is the nearest rural locality.
