= Verkh-Slyudyanka =

Verkh-Slyudyanka Верх-Слюдянка
- Selo
- Location within Altai Krai Location within Russia
- Coordinates: 51°47′N 83°47′E
- Country: Russia
- Region: Altai Krai
- District: Ust-Kalmansky District
- Time zone: UTC+7:00

Verkh-Slyudyanka (Russian: Верх-Слюдянка) is a rural locality (a selo) in Mikhaylovsky Selsoviet, Ust-Kalmansky District, Altai Krai, Russia. The population was 144 as of 2013. There are 3 streets.

== Geography ==
Verkh-Slyudyanka is located 61 km southeast of Ust-Kalmanka (the district's administrative centre) by road. Sibiryachikha and Beryozovka are the nearest rural localities.
