= Granichnoye =

Granichnoye Граничное
- Selo
- Location within Altai Krai Location within Russia
- Coordinates: 52°48′N 78°25′E
- Country: Russia
- Region: Altai Krai
- District: Tabunsky District
- Time zone: UTC+7:00

Granichnoye (Russian: Граничное) is a rural locality (a selo) in Altaysky Selsoviet, Tabunsky District, Altai Krai, Russia. The population was 32 as of 2013. There are 3 streets.

== Geography ==
Granichnoye is located on the Kulundinskaya plain, 34 km west of Tabuny (the district's administrative centre) by road. Kamyshenka and Raygorod are the nearest rural localities.
