= Tulay, Altai Krai =

Tulay Тулай
- Settlement
- Location within Altai Krai Location within Russia
- Coordinates: 53°07′N 81°52′E
- Country: Russia
- Region: Altai Krai
- District: Rebrikhinsky District
- Time zone: UTC+7:00

Tulay (Russian: Тулай) is a rural locality (a settlement) in Shumilikhinsky Selsoviet, Rebrikhinsky District, Altai Krai, Russia. The population was 108 as of 2013. There are 2 streets.

== Geography ==
Tulay is located 32 km west of Rebrikha (the district's administrative centre) by road. Shumilikha is the nearest rural locality.
