= Yermakovka =

Yermakovka Ермаковка
- Selo
- Location within Altai Krai Location within Russia
- Coordinates: 52°50′N 79°05′E
- Country: Russia
- Region: Altai Krai
- District: Tabunsky District
- Time zone: UTC+7:00

Yermakovka (Russian: Ермаковка) is a rural locality (a selo) in Lebedinsky Selsoviet, Tabunsky District, Altai Krai, Russia. The population was 32 as of 2013. There is 1 street.

== Geography ==
Yermakovka is located 24 km east of Tabuny (the district's administrative centre) by road. Saratovka is the nearest rural locality.
