= Cheremshanka, Altaysky District, Altai Krai =

Cheremshanka Черемшанка
- Settlement
- Location within Altai Krai Location within Russia
- Coordinates: 51°45′N 85°26′E
- Country: Russia
- Region: Altai Krai
- District: Altaysky District
- Time zone: UTC+7:00

Cheremshanka (Russian: Черемшанка) is a rural locality (a settlement) in Proletarsky Selsoviet, Altaysky District, Altai Krai, Russia. The population was 2 as of 2013. There is 1 street.

== Geography ==
Cheremshanka is located 34 km south of Altayskoye (the district's administrative centre) by road. Basargino is the nearest rural locality.
