= Sibir, Altai Krai =

Sibir Сибирь
- Settlement
- Location within Altai Krai Location within Russia
- Coordinates: 51°41′N 81°06′E
- Country: Russia
- Region: Altai Krai
- District: Yegoryevsky District
- Time zone: UTC+7:00

Sibir (Russian: Сибирь) is a rural locality (a settlement) in Novoyegoryevsky Selsoviet, Yegoryevsky District, Altai Krai, Russia. The population was 18 as of 2013.

== Geography ==
Sibir is located 23 km southeast of Novoyegoryevskoye (the district's administrative centre) by road. Peschany Borok is the nearest rural locality.
