= Khabary (station) =

Khabary Хабары
- Station
- Location within Altai Krai Location within Russia
- Coordinates: 53°45′N 79°39′E
- Country: Russia
- Region: Altai Krai
- District: Khabarsky District
- Time zone: UTC+7:00

Khabary (Russian: Хабары) is a rural locality (a station) in Korotoyaksky Selsoviet, Khabarsky District, Altai Krai, Russia. The population was 89 as of 2013. There is 1 street.
