= Novotyumentsevo =

Novotyumentsevo Новотюменцево
- Settlement
- Location within Altai Krai Location within Russia
- Coordinates: 53°03′N 80°12′E
- Country: Russia
- Region: Altai Krai
- District: Blagoveshchensky District
- Time zone: UTC+7:00

Novotyumentsevo (Russian: Новотюменцево) is a rural locality (a settlement) in Novokulundinsky Selsoviet, Blagoveshchensky District, Altai Krai, Russia. The population was 187 as of 2013. It was founded in 1812. There are 2 streets.

== Geography ==
Novotyumentsevo is located 46 km northeast of Blagoveshchenka (the district's administrative centre) by road. Novokulundinka is the nearest rural locality.
