= Vidonovo =

Vidonovo Видоново
- Selo
- Location within Altai Krai Location within Russia
- Coordinates: 53°58′N 84°03′E
- Country: Russia
- Region: Altai Krai
- District: Zalesovsky District
- Time zone: UTC+7:00

Vidonovo (Russian: Видоново) is a rural locality (a selo) in Cheryomushkinskoye Selsoviet, Zalesovsky District, Altai Krai, Russia. The population was 152 as of 2013. There are 5 streets.

== Geography ==
Vidonovo is located 50 km west of Zalesovo (the district's administrative centre) by road. Shadrintsevo is the nearest rural locality.
