= Zheleznodorozhnaya Kazarma 24 km =

Zheleznodorozhnaya Kazarma 24 km Железнодорожная Казарма 24 км
- Station
- Location within Altai Krai Location within Russia
- Coordinates: 52°38′N 79°14′E
- Country: Russia
- Region: Altai Krai
- District: Kulundinsky District
- Time zone: UTC+7:00

Zheleznodorozhnaya Kazarma 24 km (Russian: Железнодорожная Казарма 24 км) is a rural locality (a station) in Zlatopolinsky Selsoviet, Kulundinsky District, Altai Krai, Russia. The population was 633 as of 2013. There are 6 streets.
