= Kazyonnaya Zaimka =

Kazyonnaya Zaimka Казённая Заимка
- Settlement
- Location within Altai Krai Location within Russia
- Coordinates: 53°23′N 83°36′E
- Country: Russia
- Region: Altai Krai
- District: Barnaul
- Time zone: UTC+7:00

Kazyonnaya Zaimka (Russian: Казённая Заимка) is a rural locality (a settlement) in Barnaul, Altai Krai, Russia. The population was 2,769 as of 2013. There are 55 streets.

== Geography ==
Kazyonnaya Zaimka is located 16 km northwest of Barnaul by road. Gonba is the nearest rural locality.
