= Krugloye, Uglovsky District, Altai Krai =

Krugloye Круглое
- Selo
- Location within Altai Krai Location within Russia
- Coordinates: 51°17′N 80°26′E
- Country: Russia
- Region: Altai Krai
- District: Uglovsky District
- Time zone: UTC+7:00

Krugloye (Russian: Круглое) is a rural locality (a selo) and the administrative center of Kruglyansky Selsoviet, Uglovsky District, Altai Krai, Russia. The population was 731 as of 2013. There are 6 streets. It was founded in 1877.

== Geography ==
Krugloye is located 28 km east of Uglovskoye (the district's administrative centre) by road. Kuybyshevo is the nearest rural locality.
