= Kalinovka, Kamensky District, Altai Krai =

Kalinovka Калиновка
- Settlement
- Location within Altai Krai Location within Russia
- Coordinates: 53°27′N 81°34′E
- Country: Russia
- Region: Altai Krai
- District: Kamensky District
- Time zone: UTC+7:00

Kalinovka (Russian: Калиновка) is a rural locality (a settlement) in Plotnikovsky Selsoviet, Kamensky District, Altai Krai, Russia. The population was 67 as of 2013. There are 2 streets.

== Geography ==
Kalinovka is located 45 km south of Kamen-na-Obi (the district's administrative centre) by road. Lugovoye is the nearest rural locality.
