= Posyolok VI Kongressa Kominterna =

Posyolok VI Kongressa Kominterna Посёлок VI Конгресса Коминтерна
- Settlement
- Location within Altai Krai Location within Russia
- Coordinates: 51°18′N 81°31′E
- Country: Russia
- Region: Altai Krai
- District: Rubtsovsky District
- Time zone: UTC+7:00

Posyolok VI Kongressa Kominterna (Russian: Посёлок VI Конгресса Коминтерна) is a rural locality (a settlement) in Vishnyovsky Selsoviet, Rubtsovsky District, Altai Krai, Russia. The population was 196 as of 2013. There are 3 streets.

== Geography ==
The settlement is located 42 km southeast of Rubtsovsk (the district's administrative centre) by road. Vishnyovka is the nearest rural locality.
