= Yekaterininskoye =

Yekaterininskoye Екатерининское
- Selo
- Location within Altai Krai Location within Russia
- Coordinates: 50°54′N 82°01′E
- Country: Russia
- Region: Altai Krai
- District: Tretyakovsky District
- Time zone: UTC+7:00

Yekaterininskoye (Russian: Екатерининское) is a rural locality (a selo) and the administrative center of Yekaterininsky Selsoviet, Tretyakovsky District, Altai Krai, Russia. The population was 1,111 as of 2013. There are 10 streets.

== Geography ==
Yekaterininskoye is located 18 km south of Staroaleyskoye (the district's administrative centre) by road, on the Aley River. Lopatinka is the nearest rural locality.
