= Krasnaya Dubrava =

Krasnaya Dubrava Красная Дубрава
- Settlement
- Location within Altai Krai Location within Russia
- Coordinates: 53°16′N 82°49′E
- Country: Russia
- Region: Altai Krai
- District: Pavlovsky District
- Time zone: UTC+7:00

Krasnaya Dubrava (Russian: Красная Дубрава) is a rural locality (a settlement) in Rogozikhinsky Selsoviet, Pavlovsky District, Altai Krai, Russia. The population was 257 as of 2013. There are six streets.

== Geography ==
Krasnaya Dubrava is located 12 km southwest of Pavlovsk (the district's administrative centre) by road. Rogozikha is the nearest rural locality.
