= Kalinovsky =

Kalinovsky Калиновский
- Settlement
- Location within Altai Krai Location within Russia
- Coordinates: 53°32′N 85°20′E
- Country: Russia
- Region: Altai Krai
- District: Kytmanovsky District
- Time zone: UTC+7:00

Kalinovsky (Russian: Калиновский) is a rural locality (a settlement) in Dmitro-Titovsky Selsoviet, Kytmanovsky District, Altai Krai, Russia. The population was 79 as of 2013. There is 1 street.

== Geography ==
Kalinovsky is located 24 km north of Kytmanovo (the district's administrative centre) by road. Petrushikha is the nearest rural locality.
