= Podsosnovo =

Podsosnovo Подсосново
- Village
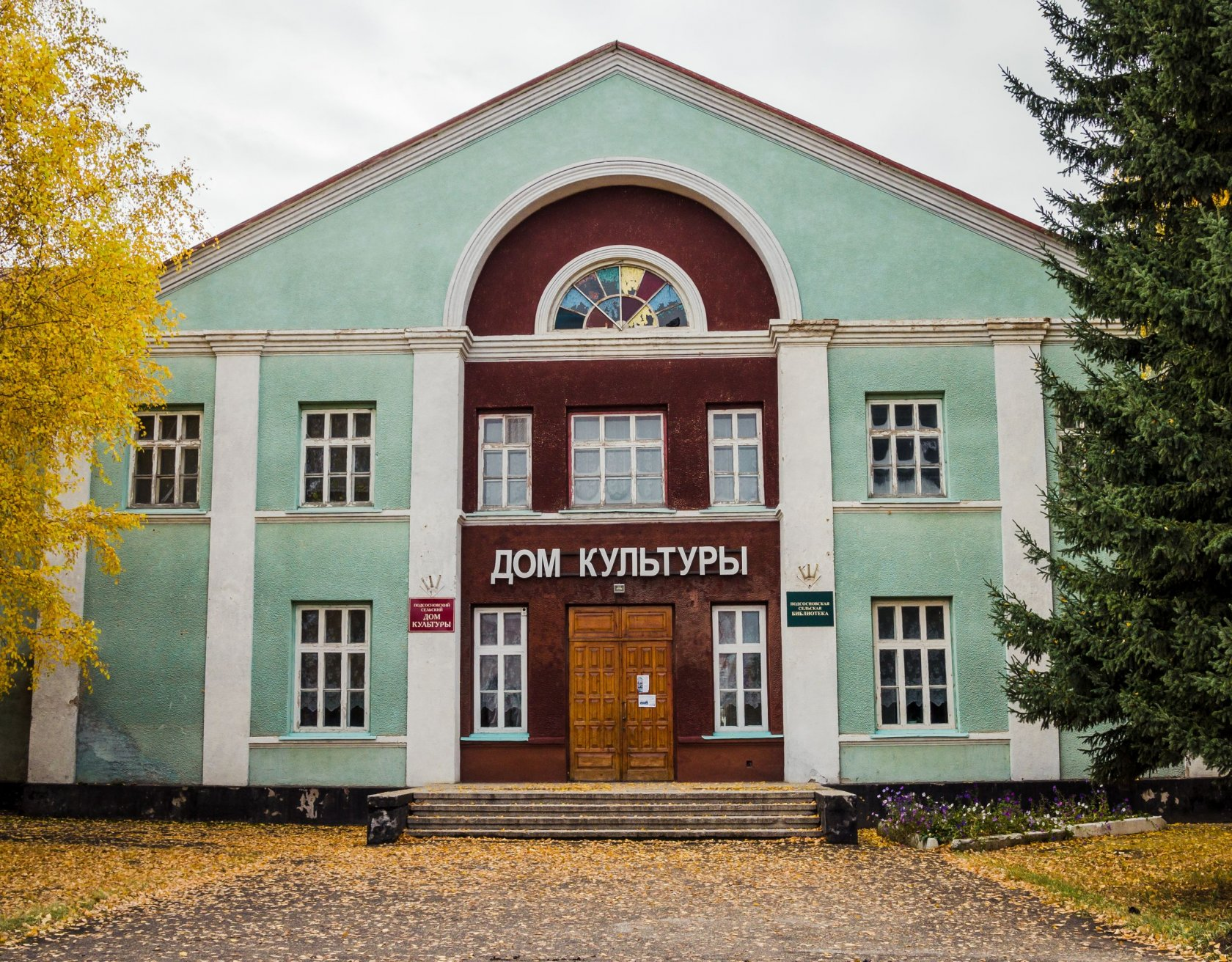
- House of culture

- Location within Altai Krai Location within Russia
- Coordinates: 53°22′N 78°55′E
- Country: Russia
- Region: Altai Krai
- District: Nemetsky National District
- Time zone: UTC+7:00

Podsosnovo (Russian: Подсосново) is a rural locality (a selo) in Nemetsky National District, Altai Krai, Russia. The population was 2093 as of 2016. There are 6 streets.

== Geography ==
Podsosnovo is located 21 km north of Galbshtadt (the district's administrative centre) by road. Kamyshi is the nearest rural locality.

== Ethnicity ==
The village is inhabited by Russians and Germans.
