= Porozhneye =

Porozhneye Порожнее
- Selo
- Location within Altai Krai Location within Russia
- Coordinates: 52°16′N 81°55′E
- Country: Russia
- Region: Altai Krai
- District: Shipunovsky District
- Time zone: UTC+7:00

Porozhneye (Russian: Порожнее) is a rural locality (a selo) and the administrative center of Porozhnensky Selsoviet, Shipunovsky District, Altai Krai, Russia. The population was 805 as of 2013. There are 10 streets.

== Geography ==
Porozhneye is located 34 km WNW of Shipunovo (the district's administrative centre) by road. Artamonovo is the nearest rural locality.
