= Kalinovka, Rubtsovsky District, Altai Krai =

Kalinovka Калиновка
- Settlement
- Location within Altai Krai Location within Russia
- Coordinates: 51°29′N 81°20′E
- Country: Russia
- Region: Altai Krai
- District: Rubtsovsky District
- Time zone: UTC+7:00

Kalinovka (Russian: Калиновка) is a rural locality (a settlement) in Novosklyuikhinsky Selsoviet, Rubtsovsky District, Altai Krai, Russia. The population was 255 as of 2013. There are 3 streets.

== Geography ==
Kalinovka is located 11 km east of Rubtsovsk (the district's administrative centre) by road. Vympel is the nearest rural locality.
