= Gonokhovo, Kamensky District, Altai Krai =

Gonokhovo Гонохово
- Selo
- Location within Altai Krai Location within Russia
- Coordinates: 53°38′N 81°33′E
- Country: Russia
- Region: Altai Krai
- District: Kamensky District
- Time zone: UTC+7:00

Gonokhovo (Russian: Гонохово) is a rural locality (a selo) and the administrative center of Gonokhovsky Selsoviet, Kamensky District, Altai Krai, Russia. The population was 731 as of 2013. There are 10 streets.

== Geography ==
Gonokhovo is located 28 km southeast of Kamen-na-Obi (the district's administrative centre) by road. Myski is the nearest rural locality.
