= Bogatskoye =

Bogatskoye Богатское
- Settlement
- Location within Altai Krai Location within Russia
- Coordinates: 53°27′N 79°02′E
- Country: Russia
- Region: Altai Krai
- District: Khabarsky District
- Time zone: UTC+7:00

Bogatskoye (Russian: Богатское) is a rural locality (a settlement) in Novoilyinsky Selsoviet, Khabarsky District, Altai Krai, Russia. The population was 235 as of 2013. It was founded in 1735. There are 3 streets.

== Geography ==
Bogatskoye is located 39 km southwest of Khabary (the district's administrative centre) by road.
