= Vlasikha (selo), Altai Krai =

Vlasikha Власиха
- Selo
- Location within Altai Krai Location within Russia
- Coordinates: 53°17′N 83°35′E
- Country: Russia
- Region: Altai Krai
- District: Barnaul
- Time zone: UTC+7:00

Vlasikha (Russian: Власиха) is a rural locality (a selo) in Barnaul, Altai Krai, Russia. The population was 2,992 as of 2013. There are 90 streets.

== Geography ==
Vlasikha is located 18 km southwest of Barnaul by road. Oktyabrsky is the nearest rural locality.
