= Lenki =

Lenki Леньки
- Selo
- Location within Altai Krai Location within Russia
- Coordinates: 52°56′N 80°26′E
- Country: Russia
- Region: Altai Krai
- District: Blagoveshchensky District
- Time zone: UTC+7:00

Lenki (Russian: Леньки) is a rural locality (a selo) and the administrative center of Lenkovsky Selsoviet, Blagoveshchensky District, Altai Krai, Russia. The population was 3,232 as of 2013. There are 52 streets.

== Geography ==
Lenki is located 52 km northeast of Blagoveshchenka (the district's administrative centre) by road. Alexeyevka is the nearest rural locality.
