= Novochesnokovka =

Novochesnokovka Новочесноковка
- Selo
- Location within Altai Krai Location within Russia
- Coordinates: 53°30′N 84°25′E
- Country: Russia
- Region: Altai Krai
- District: Pervomaysky District
- Time zone: UTC+7:00

Novochesnokovka (Russian: Новочесноковка) is a rural locality (a selo) in Zhilinsky Selsoviet, Pervomaysky District, Altai Krai, Russia. The population was 147 as of 2013. There are 8 streets.

== Geography ==
Novochesnokovka is located 48 km northeast of Novoaltaysk (the district's administrative centre) by road.
