= Nizhnyaya Petrovka =

Nizhnyaya Petrovka Нижняя Петровка
- Settlement
- Location within Altai Krai Location within Russia
- Coordinates: 52°54′N 83°51′E
- Country: Russia
- Region: Altai Krai
- District: Pervomaysky District
- Time zone: UTC+7:00

Nizhnyaya Petrovka (Russian: Нижняя Петровка) is a rural locality (a settlement) in Rasskazikhinsky Selsoviet, Pervomaysky District, Altai Krai, Russia. The population was 188 as of 2013. There are 5 streets.

== Geography ==
Nizhnyaya Petrovka is located 67 km south of Novoaltaysk (the district's administrative centre) by road. Malaya Rechka is the nearest rural locality.
