= Prigorodny, Barnaul, Altai Krai =

Prigorodny Пригородный
- Settlement
- Location within Altai Krai Location within Russia
- Coordinates: 53°18′N 83°36′E
- Country: Russia
- Region: Altai Krai
- District: Barnaul
- Time zone: UTC+7:00

Prigorodny (Russian: Пригородный) is a rural locality (a settlement) in Barnaul, Altai Krai, Russia. The population was 3,025 as of 2013. There are 24 streets.

== Geography ==
Prigorodny is located 15 km southwest of Barnaul by road. Novosilikatny is the nearest rural locality.
