= Podpalattsy =

Podpalattsy Подпалатцы
- Settlement
- Location within Altai Krai Location within Russia
- Coordinates: 51°14′N 82°43′E
- Country: Russia
- Region: Altai Krai
- District: Kuryinsky District
- Time zone: UTC+7:00

Podpalattsy (Russian: Подпалатцы) is a rural locality (a settlement) in Bugryshikhinsky Selsoviet, Kuryinsky District, Altai Krai, Russia. The population was 9 as of 2013. There are 2 streets.

== Geography ==
Podpalattsy is located 68 km southeast of Kurya (the district's administrative centre) by road. Bugryshikha is the nearest rural locality.
