= Shumanovka =

Shumanovka Шумановка
- Selo
- Location within Altai Krai Location within Russia
- Coordinates: 53°15′N 78°55′E
- Country: Russia
- Region: Altai Krai
- District: Nemetsky National District
- Time zone: UTC+7:00

Shumanovka (Russian: Шумановка) is a rural locality (a selo) and the administrative center of Shumanovsky Selsoviet of Nemetsky National District, Altai Krai, Russia. The population was 1222 as of 2016. There are 5 streets.

== Geography ==
Shumanovka is located within the Kulunda Plain, 8 km north of Galbshtadt (the district's administrative centre) by road. Galbshtadt is the nearest rural locality.

== Ethnicity ==
The village is inhabited by Russians, Germans and others.
