= Borzovaya Zaimka =

Borzovaya Zaimka Борзовая Заимка
- Settlement
- Location within Altai Krai Location within Russia
- Coordinates: 53°17′N 83°39′E
- Country: Russia
- Region: Altai Krai
- District: Barnaul
- Time zone: UTC+7:00

Borzovaya Zaimka (Russian: Борзовая Заимка) is a rural locality (a settlement) in Barnaul, Altai Krai, Russia. The population was 2,229 as of 2013.

== Geography ==
Borzovaya Zaimka is located 18 km southwest of Barnaul by road. Polzunovo is the nearest rural locality.
