= Malinovka, Shelabolikhinsky District, Altai Krai =

Malinovka Малиновка
- Selo
- Location within Altai Krai Location within Russia
- Coordinates: 53°24′N 82°44′E
- Country: Russia
- Region: Altai Krai
- District: Shelabolikhinsky District
- Time zone: UTC+7:00

Malinovka (Russian: Малиновка) is a rural locality (a selo) in Novoobintsevsky Selsoviet, Shelabolikhinsky District, Altai Krai, Russia. The population was 25 as of 2013. There is 1 street.

== Geography ==
Malinovka is located 14 km east of Shelabolikha (the district's administrative centre) by road. Novoobintsevo is the nearest rural locality.
