= Pokrovka, Slavgorod, Altai Krai =

Pokrovka Покровка
- Selo
- Location within Altai Krai Location within Russia
- Coordinates: 52°57′N 78°24′E
- Country: Russia
- Region: Altai Krai
- District: Slavgorod
- Time zone: UTC+7:00

Pokrovka (Russian: Покровка) is a rural locality (a selo) in Slavgorod, Altai Krai, Russia. The population was 507 as of 2013. There are 6 streets.
