= Lugovskoye =

Lugovskoye Луговское
- Selo
- Location within Altai Krai Location within Russia
- Coordinates: 52°45′N 85°10′E
- Country: Russia
- Region: Altai Krai
- District: Zonalny District
- Time zone: UTC+7:00

Lugovskoye (Russian: Луговское) is a rural locality (a selo) and the administrative center of Lugovsky Selsoviet, Zonalny District, Altai Krai, Russia. The population was 1,163 as of 2013. There are 16 streets.

== Geography ==
Lugovskoye is located 28 km northeast of Zonalnoye (the district's administrative centre) by road. Novy Byt is the nearest rural locality.
