= Batalovo =

Batalovo Баталово
- Selo
- Location within Altai Krai Location within Russia
- Coordinates: 52°12′N 81°51′E
- Country: Russia
- Region: Altai Krai
- District: Shipunovsky District
- Time zone: UTC+7:00

Batalovo (Russian: Баталово) is a rural locality (a selo) in Porozhnensky Selsoviet, Shipunovsky District, Altai Krai, Russia. The population was 378 as of 2013. There are 5 streets.

== Geography ==
Batalovo is located 44 km west of Shipunovo (the district's administrative centre) by road. Porozhneye is the nearest rural locality.
