= Polzunovo =

Polzunovo Ползуново
- Station
- Location within Altai Krai Location within Russia
- Coordinates: 53°17′N 83°41′E
- Country: Russia
- Region: Altai Krai
- District: Barnaul
- Time zone: UTC+7:00

Polzunovo (Russian: Ползуново) is a rural locality (a station) in Barnaul, Altai Krai, Russia. The population was 332 as of 2013. There are 3 streets.

== Geography ==
Polzunovo is located 12 km southwest of Barnaul by road. Borzovaya Zaimka is the nearest rural locality.
