= Maximovka, Altai Krai =

Maximovka Максимовка
- Selo
- Location within Altai Krai Location within Russia
- Coordinates: 53°05′N 78°46′E
- Country: Russia
- Region: Altai Krai
- District: Slavgorod
- Time zone: UTC+7:00

Maximovka (Russian: Максимовка) is a rural locality (a selo) in Slavgorod, Altai Krai, Russia. The population was 194 as of 2013. There are 2 streets.
