= Kuyacha =

Kuyacha Куяча
- Selo
- Location within Altai Krai Location within Russia
- Coordinates: 51°40′N 85°05′E
- Country: Russia
- Region: Altai Krai
- District: Altaysky District
- Time zone: UTC+7:00

Kuyacha (Russian: Куяча) is a rural locality (a selo) and the administrative center of Kuyachinsky Selsoviet, Altaysky District, Altai Krai, Russia. The population was 465 as of 2013. There are 6 streets.

== Geography ==
Kuyacha is located 63 km southwest of Altayskoye (the district's administrative centre) by road. Kuyagan is the nearest rural locality.
