= Zheleznodorozhnaya Kazarma 538 km =

Zheleznodorozhnaya Kazarma 538 km Железнодорожная Казарма 538 км
- Station
- Location within Altai Krai Location within Russia
- Coordinates: 51°15′N 81°05′E
- Country: Russia
- Region: Altai Krai
- District: Rubtsovsky District
- Time zone: UTC+7:00

Zheleznodorozhnaya Kazarma 538 km (Russian: Железнодорожная Казарма 538 км) is a rural locality (a station) in Vesyoloyarsky Selsoviet, Rubtsovsky District, Altai Krai, Russia. The population was 16 as of 2013. There is 1 street.
