= Kubanka, Altai Krai =

Kubanka Кубанка
- Settlement
- Location within Altai Krai Location within Russia
- Coordinates: 52°49′N 83°21′E
- Country: Russia
- Region: Altai Krai
- District: Kalmansky District
- Time zone: UTC+7:00

Kubanka (Russian: Кубанка) is a rural locality (a settlement) and the administrative center of Kubansky Selsoviet, Kalmansky District, Altai Krai, Russia. The population was 474 as of 2013. There are 11 streets.

== Geography ==
Kubanka is located on the Kalmanka River, 17 km southwest of Kalmanka (the district's administrative centre) by road. Logovskoye is the nearest rural locality.
