= Lyapunovo =

Lyapunovo Ляпуново
- Selo
- Location within Altai Krai Location within Russia
- Coordinates: 51°17′N 80°07′E
- Country: Russia
- Region: Altai Krai
- District: Uglovsky District
- Time zone: UTC+7:00

Lyapunovo (Russian: Ляпуново) is a rural locality (a selo) in Shadrukhinsky Selsoviet, Uglovsky District, Altai Krai, Russia. The population was 127 as of 2013. It was founded in 1864. There are 2 streets.

== Geography ==
Lyapunovo is located 11 km south of Uglovskoye (the district's administrative centre) by road. Uglovskoye is the nearest rural locality.
