= Vylkovo, Altai Krai =

Vylkovo Вылково
- Selo
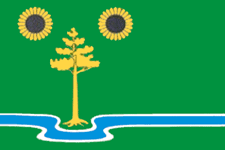
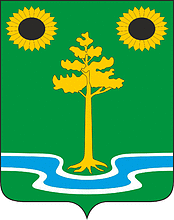
- Flag Seal

- Location within Altai Krai Location within Russia
- Coordinates: 53°04′N 81°25′E
- Country: Russia
- Region: Altai Krai
- District: Tyumentsevsky District
- Time zone: UTC+7:00

Vylkovo (Russian: Вылково) is a rural locality (a selo) and the administrative center of Vylkovsky Selsoviet, Tyumentsevsky District, Altai Krai, Russia. The population was 1,925 as of 2013. It was founded in 1726. There are 24 streets.

== Geography ==
Vylkovo is located 29 km south of Tyumentsevo (the district's administrative centre) by road. Grishenskoye is the nearest rural locality.
