= Mokhnatushka =

Mokhnatushka Мохнатушка
- Settlement
- Location within Altai Krai Location within Russia
- Coordinates: 53°13′N 83°34′E
- Country: Russia
- Region: Altai Krai
- District: Barnaul
- Time zone: UTC+7:00

Mokhnatushka (Russian: Мохнатушка) is a rural locality (a settlement) in Barnaul, Altai Krai, Russia. The population was 262 as of 2013. There are 7 streets.

== Geography ==
Mokhnatushka is located 27 km southwest of Barnaul by road. Chernitsk is the nearest rural locality.
