= Gunikha =

Gunikha Гуниха
- Selo
- Location within Altai Krai Location within Russia
- Coordinates: 54°11′N 84°38′E
- Country: Russia
- Region: Altai Krai
- District: Zalesovsky District
- Time zone: UTC+7:00

Gunikha (Russian: Гуниха) is a rural locality (a selo) in Peshchersky Selsoviet, Zalesovsky District, Altai Krai, Russia. The population was 181 as of 2013. There are 8 streets.

== Geography ==
Gunikha is located 35 km north of Zalesovo (the district's administrative centre) by road. Peshcherka is the nearest rural locality.
