= Novy Charysh =

Novy Charysh Новый Чарыш
- Settlement
- Location within Altai Krai Location within Russia
- Coordinates: 52°10′36″N 83°22′12″E
- Country: Russia
- Region: Altai Krai
- District: Ust-Kalmansky District
- Time zone: UTC+7:00

Novy Charysh (Russian: Новый Чарыш) is a rural locality (a settlement) in Ust-Kalmansky District, Altai Krai, Russia. The population was 208 as of 2013. There are 2 streets.

== Geography ==
Novy Charysh is located 8 km northeast of Ust-Kalmanka (the district's administrative centre) by road. Charyshskoye is the nearest rural locality.
