= Mamontovo, Rubtsovsky District, Altai Krai =

Mamontovo Мамонтово
- Station
- Location within Altai Krai Location within Russia
- Coordinates: 51°45′N 81°23′E
- Country: Russia
- Region: Altai Krai
- District: Rubtsovsky District
- Time zone: UTC+7:00

Mamontovo (Russian: Мамонтово) is a rural locality (a station) in Tishinsky Selsoviet, Rubtsovsky District, Altai Krai, Russia. The population was 437 on 2013. There are six streets.

== Geography ==
It is located 9 kilometres (5.6 mi) south-east of Tishinka.
