= Nazarovka =

Nazarovka Назаровка
- Village
- Location within Altai Krai Location within Russia
- Coordinates: 52°01′N 79°38′E
- Country: Russia
- Region: Altai Krai
- District: Mikhaylovsky District
- Time zone: UTC+7:00

Nazarovka (Russian: Назаровка) is a rural locality (a selo) and the administrative center of Nazarovsky Selsoviet of Mikhaylovsky District, Altai Krai, Russia. The population was 540 in 2016. There are 6 streets.

== Geography ==
Nazarovka is located 26 km north of Mikhaylovskoye (the district's administrative centre) by road. Poluyamki is the nearest rural locality.
