= Kostyaki =

Kostyaki Костяки
- Settlement
- Location within Altai Krai Location within Russia
- Coordinates: 53°33′N 83°44′E
- Country: Russia
- Region: Altai Krai
- District: Pervomaysky District
- Time zone: UTC+7:00

Kostyaki (Russian: Костяки) is a rural locality (a settlement) in Sibirsky Selsoviet, Pervomaysky District, Altai Krai, Russia. The population was 34 as of 2013. There is 1 street.

== Geography ==
Kostyaki is located 36 km north of Novoaltaysk (the district's administrative centre) by road. Lesnaya Polyana is the nearest rural locality.
