= Malinovka, Zarinsky District, Altai Krai =

Malinovka Малиновка
- Selo
- Location within Altai Krai Location within Russia
- Coordinates: 53°54′N 85°24′E
- Country: Russia
- Region: Altai Krai
- District: Zarinsky District
- Time zone: UTC+7:00

Malinovka (Russian: Малиновка) is a rural locality (a selo) in Sosnovsky Selsoviet, Zarinsky District, Altai Krai, Russia. The population was 36 as of 2013. There are 3 streets.

== Geography ==
Malinovka is located 53 km northeast of Zarinsk (the district's administrative centre) by road. Sosnovka is the nearest rural locality.
