= Lukovka =

Lukovka Луковка
- Selo
- Location within Altai Krai Location within Russia
- Coordinates: 53°54′N 80°16′E
- Country: Russia
- Region: Altai Krai
- District: Pankrushikhinsky District
- Time zone: UTC+7:00

Lukovka (Russian: Луковка) is a rural locality (a selo) and the administrative center of Lukovsky Selsoviet, Pankrushikhinsky District, Altai Krai, Russia. The population was 699 as of 2013. There are 5 streets.

== Geography ==
Lukovka is located 12 km north of Pankrushikha (the district's administrative centre) by road. Velizhanka is the nearest rural locality.
