= Shipunikha =

Shipunikha Шипуниха
- Selo
- Location within Altai Krai Location within Russia
- Coordinates: 50°56′N 82°22′E
- Country: Russia
- Region: Altai Krai
- District: Tretyakovsky District
- Time zone: UTC+7:00

Shipunikha (Russian: Шипуниха) is a rural locality (a selo) and the administrative center of Shipunikhinsky Selsoviet, Tretyakovsky District, Altai Krai, Russia. The population was 539 as of 2013. There are 9 streets.

== Geography ==
Shipunikha is located 37 km east of Staroaleyskoye (the district's administrative centre) by road. Palatnaya is the nearest rural locality.
