= Saratovka, Tabunsky District, Altai Krai =

Saratovka Саратовка
- Selo
- Location within Altai Krai Location within Russia
- Coordinates: 52°52′N 79°07′E
- Country: Russia
- Region: Altai Krai
- District: Tabunsky District
- Time zone: UTC+7:00

Saratovka (Russian: Саратовка) is a rural locality (a selo) in Serebropolsky Selsoviet, Tabunsky District, Altai Krai, Russia. The population was 120 as of 2013. There is 1 street.

== Geography ==
By road, Saratovka is located 28 km northeast of Tabuny (the district's administrative centre). Serebropol is the nearest rural locality.
