= Nagorny, Biysk, Altai Krai =

Nagorny Нагорный
- Settlement
- Location within Altai Krai Location within Russia
- Coordinates: 52°33′N 85°12′E
- Country: Russia
- Region: Altai Krai
- District: Biysk
- Time zone: UTC+7:00

Nagorny (Russian: Нагорный) is a rural locality (a settlement) in Biysk, Altai Krai, Russia. The population was 7,777 as of 2013.
