= Partizanskoye, Altai Krai =

Partizanskoye Партизанское
- Selo
- Location within Altai Krai Location within Russia
- Coordinates: 53°20′N 78°21′E
- Country: Russia
- Region: Altai Krai
- District: Burlinsky District
- Time zone: UTC+7:00

Partizanskoye (Russian: Партизанское) is a rural locality (a selo) and the administrative center of Partizansky Selsoviet, Burlinsky District, Altai Krai, Russia. The population was 542 as of 2013. It was founded in 1968. There are 6 streets.

== Geography ==
Partizanskoye is located 3 km southwest of Burla (the district's administrative centre) by road. Burla is the nearest rural locality.
