= Borovlyanka =

Borovlyanka Боровлянка
- Selo
- Location within Altai Krai Location within Russia
- Coordinates: 53°52′N 85°28′E
- Country: Russia
- Region: Altai Krai
- District: Zarinsky District
- Time zone: UTC+7:00

Borovlyanka (Russian: Боровлянка) is a rural locality (a selo) in Sosnovsky Selsoviet, Zarinsky District, Altai Krai, Russia. The population was 38 as of 2013. There are 4 streets.

== Geography ==
Borovlyanka is located 57 km northeast of Zarinsk (the district's administrative centre) by road. Golukha is the nearest rural locality.
