= Proletarka =

Village in Altai Krai, Russia

Proletarka Пролетарка
- Selo
- Location within Altai Krai Location within Russia
- Coordinates: 51°47′N 85°21′E
- Country: Russia
- Region: Altai Krai
- District: Altaysky District
- Time zone: UTC+7:00

Proletarka (Russian: Пролетарка) is a rural locality (a selo) in Proletarsky Selsoviet, Altaysky District, Altai Krai, Russia. The population was 165 as of 2013. There are 2 streets.

== Geography ==
Proletarka is located 20 km south of Altayskoye (the district's administrative centre) by road. Rudnik is the nearest rural locality.
