= Bugryshikha =

Bugryshikha Бугрышиха
- Selo
- Location within Altai Krai Location within Russia
- Coordinates: 51°16′N 82°47′E
- Country: Russia
- Region: Altai Krai
- District: Kuryinsky District
- Time zone: UTC+7:00

Bugryshikha (Russian: Бугрышиха) is a rural locality (a selo) and the administrative center of Bugryshikhinsky Selsoviet, Kuryinsky District, Altai Krai, Russia. The population was 74 as of 2013. There are 5 streets.

== Geography ==
Bugryshikha is located 70 km southeast of Kurya (the district's administrative centre) by road. Posyolok imeni 8 Marta is the nearest rural locality.
