= Malougrenyovo =

Malougrenyovo Малоугренёво
- Selo
- Location within Altai Krai Location within Russia
- Coordinates: 52°33′N 85°20′E
- Country: Russia
- Region: Altai Krai
- District: Biysky District
- Time zone: UTC+7:00

Malougrenyovo (Russian: Малоугренёво) is a rural locality (a selo) and the administrative center of Malougryonovsky Selsoviet, Biysky District, Altai Krai, Russia. The population was 2,413 as of 2013. There are 36 streets.

== Geography ==
Malougrenyovo is located on the Biya River, 12 km east of Biysk (the district's administrative centre) by road. Solnechnaya Polyana is the nearest rural locality.
