= Novosovkhozny =

Novosovkhozny Новосовхозный
- Passing loop
- Location within Altai Krai Location within Russia
- Coordinates: 52°40′N 78°50′E
- Country: Russia
- Region: Altai Krai
- District: Tabunsky District
- Time zone: UTC+7:00

Novosovkhozny (Russian: Новосовхозный) is a rural locality (a passing loop) in Tabunsky Selsoviet, Tabunsky District, Altai Krai, Russia. The population was 3 as of 2013.
