= Dobrovka =

Dobrovka Добровка
- Selo
- Location within Altai Krai Location within Russia
- Coordinates: 53°18′27″N 79°31′04″E
- Country: Russia
- Region: Altai Krai
- District: Slavgorod
- Time zone: UTC+7:00

Dobrovka (Russian: Добровка) is a rural locality (a selo) in Slavgorod, Altai Krai, Russia. The population was 32 as of 2013. There are 2 streets.
