= Zheleznodorozhnaya Kazarma 519 km =

Zheleznodorozhnaya Kazarma 519 km Железнодорожная Казарма 519 км
- Station
- Location within Altai Krai Location within Russia
- Coordinates: 51°25′N 81°09′E
- Country: Russia
- Region: Altai Krai
- District: Rubtsovsky District
- Time zone: UTC+7:00

Zheleznodorozhnaya Kazarma 519 km (Russian: Железнодорожная Казарма 519 км) is a rural locality (a station) in Rubtsovsky Selsoviet, Rubtsovsky District, Altai Krai, Russia. It had a population of 38 as of 2013.
