= Zemlyanukha =

Zemlyanukha Землянуха
- Settlement
- Location within Altai Krai Location within Russia
- Coordinates: 53°24′N 83°35′E
- Country: Russia
- Region: Altai Krai
- District: Barnaul
- Time zone: UTC+7:00

Zemlyanukha (Russian: Землянуха) is a rural locality (a settlement) in Barnaul, Altai Krai, Russia. The population was 82 as of 2013. There are 3 streets.

== Geography ==
Zemlyanukha is located 17 km northwest of Barnaul by road. Gonba is the nearest rural locality.
