= Klepikovo =

Klepikovo Клепиково
- Selo
- Location within Altai Krai Location within Russia
- Coordinates: 52°32′N 83°46′E
- Country: Russia
- Region: Altai Krai
- District: Ust-Pristansky District
- Time zone: UTC+7:00

Klepikovo (Russian: Клепиково) is a rural locality (a selo) and the administrative center of Klepikovsky Selsoviet, Ust-Pristansky District, Altai Krai, Russia. The population was 430 as of 2013. There are 8 streets.
