= Belotserkovka, Altai Krai =

Belotserkovka Белоцерковка
- Selo
- Location within Altai Krai Location within Russia
- Coordinates: 52°43′N 79°15′E
- Country: Russia
- Region: Altai Krai
- District: Kulundinsky District
- Time zone: UTC+7:00

Belotserkovka (Russian: Белоцерковка) is a rural locality (a selo) in Konstantinovsky Selsoviet, Kulundinsky District, Altai Krai, Russia. The population was 81 as of 2013. There are 2 streets.

== Geography ==
Belotserkovka is located 39 km northeast of Kulunda (the district's administrative centre) by road. Krasnaya Sloboda is the nearest rural locality.
