= Ploskoye, Altai Krai =

Ploskoye Плоское
- Selo
- Location within Altai Krai Location within Russia
- Coordinates: 50°51′N 82°09′E
- Country: Russia
- Region: Altai Krai
- District: Tretyakovsky District
- Time zone: UTC+7:00

Ploskoye (Russian: Плоское) is a rural locality (a selo) and the administrative center of Ploskovsky Selsoviet, Tretyakovsky District, Altai Krai, Russia. The population was 737 as of 2013. There are 6 streets.

== Geography ==
Ploskoye is located 33 km southeast of Staroaleyskoye (the district's administrative centre) by road. Yekaterininskoye is the nearest rural locality.
