= Charyshskoye, Ust-Kalmansky District, Altai Krai =

Charyshskoye Чарышское
- Selo
- Location within Altai Krai Location within Russia
- Coordinates: 52°09′N 83°18′E
- Country: Russia
- Region: Altai Krai
- District: Ust-Kalmansky District
- Time zone: UTC+7:00

Charyshskoye (Russian: Чарышское) is a rural locality (a selo) and the administrative center of Charyshsky Selsoviet, Ust-Kalmansky District, Altai Krai, Russia. The population was 1,243 as of 2013. There are 10 streets.

== Geography ==
Charyshskoye is located 7 km north of Ust-Kalmanka (the district's administrative centre) by road. Ust-Kalmanka is the nearest rural locality.
