= Novovoznesenka, Rubtsovsky District, Altai Krai =

Novovoznesenka Нововознесенка
- Settlement
- Location within Altai Krai Location within Russia
- Coordinates: 51°32′N 81°42′E
- Country: Russia
- Region: Altai Krai
- District: Rubtsovsky District
- Time zone: UTC+7:00

Novovoznesenka (Russian: Нововознесенка) is a rural locality (a settlement) in Dalny Selsoviet, Rubtsovsky District, Altai Krai, Russia. The population was 73 as of 2013. There are 3 streets.

== Geography ==
Novovoznesenka is located 50 km east Rubtsovsk (the district's administrative centre) by road. Cheburikha is the nearest rural locality.
