= Lugovoye, Krasnogorsky District, Altai Krai =

Lugovoye Луговое
- Selo
- Location within Altai Krai Location within Russia
- Coordinates: 52°20′N 86°07′E
- Country: Russia
- Region: Altai Krai
- District: Krasnogorsky District
- Time zone: UTC+7:00

Lugovoye (Russian: Луговое) is a rural locality (a selo) in Krasnogorsky District, Altai Krai, Russia. The population was 70 as of 2013. There is 1 street.

== Geography ==
Lugovoye is located on the Barda River, 9 km northwest of Krasnogorskoye (the district's administrative centre) by road. Manuilskoye is the nearest rural locality.
