= Poperechnoye =

Poperechnoye Поперечное
- Selo
- Location within Altai Krai Location within Russia
- Coordinates: 53°33′N 80°46′E
- Country: Russia
- Region: Altai Krai
- District: Kamensky District
- Time zone: UTC+7:00

Poperechnoye (Russian: Поперечное) is a rural locality (a selo) and the administrative center of Poperechensky Selsoviet, Kamensky District, Altai Krai, Russia. The population was 783 as of 2013. There are 11 streets.

== Geography ==
Poperechnoye is located 49 km southwest of Kamen-na-Obi (the district's administrative centre) by road. Novoyarki is the nearest rural locality.
