= Novokuznetsovka =

Novokuznetsovka Новокузнецовка
- Settlement
- Location within Altai Krai Location within Russia
- Coordinates: 51°13′N 82°03′E
- Country: Russia
- Region: Altai Krai
- District: Zmeinogorsky District
- Time zone: UTC+7:00

Novokuznetsovka (Russian: Новокузнецовка) is a rural locality (a settlement) in Karamyshevsky Selsoviet, Zmeinogorsky District, Altai Krai, Russia. The population was 125 as of 2013. There is 1 street.

== Geography ==
Novokuznetsovka is located 16 km northwest of Zmeinogorsk (the district's administrative centre) by road. Karamyshevo is the nearest rural locality.
