= Dvorskoye =

Dvorskoye Дворское
- Selo
- Location within Altai Krai Location within Russia
- Coordinates: 53°18′N 79°17′E
- Country: Russia
- Region: Altai Krai
- District: Nemetsky National District
- Time zone: UTC+7:00

Dvorskoye (Russian: Дворское) is a rural locality (a selo) in Nemetsky National District, Altai Krai, Russia. The population was 149 as of 2013.

== Geography ==
Dvorskoye is located 26 km northeast of Galbshtadt (the district's administrative centre) by road. Orlovo is the nearest rural locality.
