= Kuatovka =

Kuatovka Куатовка
- Selo
- Location within Altai Krai Location within Russia
- Coordinates: 52°52′N 78°41′E
- Country: Russia
- Region: Altai Krai
- District: Slavgorod
- Time zone: UTC+7:00

Kuatovka (Russian: Куатовка) is a rural locality (selo) in Slavgorod, Altai Krai, Russia. The population was 54 as of 2013. There are 3 streets.
