= Soboli, Altai Krai =

Soboli Соболи
- Settlement
- Location within Altai Krai Location within Russia
- Coordinates: 53°05′N 80°43′E
- Country: Russia
- Region: Altai Krai
- District: Zavyalovsky District
- Time zone: UTC+7:00

Soboli (Russian: Соболи) is a rural locality (a settlement) in Glubokovsky Selsoviet, Zavyalovsky District, Altai Krai, Russia. The population was 108 as of 2013. There are 2 streets.

== Geography ==
Soboli is located 37 km north of Zavyalovo (the district's administrative centre) by road. Sitnikovo is the nearest rural locality.
