= Odintsovka =

Odintsovka Одинцовка
- Selo
- Location within Altai Krai Location within Russia
- Coordinates: 52°26′N 84°57′E
- Country: Russia
- Region: Altai Krai
- District: Biysk
- Time zone: UTC+7:00

Odintsovka (Russian: Одинцовка) is a rural locality (a selo) in Biysk, Altai Krai, Russia. The population was 401 as of 2013. There are 8 streets.

== Geography ==
Odintsovka is located 27 km southwest of Biysk (the district's administrative centre) by road. Fominskoye is the nearest rural locality.
