= Verkh-Ozyornoe =

Verkh-Ozyornoe Верх-Озёрное
- Village
- Location within Altai Krai Location within Russia
- Coordinates: 52°19′N 84°16′E
- Country: Russia
- Region: Altai Krai
- District: Bystroistoksky District
- Time zone: UTC+7:00

Verkh-Ozyornoe (Russian: Верх-Озёрное) is a rural locality (a selo) and the administrative center of Verkh-Ozerninsky Selsoviet of Bystroistoksky District, Altai Krai, Russia. The population was 454 as of 2016. There are 12 streets.

== Geography ==
Verkh-Ozyornoe is located south from the Ob River, on the bank of the Zavyalovo Lake, 11 km southwest of Bystry Istok (the district's administrative centre) by road. Bystry Istok is the nearest rural locality.

== Ethnicity ==
The village is inhabited by Russians and others.
