= Smirnovo, Altai Krai =

Smirnovo Смирново
- Selo
- Location within Altai Krai Location within Russia
- Coordinates: 53°41′N 84°40′E
- Country: Russia
- Region: Altai Krai
- District: Zarinsky District
- Time zone: UTC+7:00

Smirnovo (Russian: Смирново) is a rural locality (a selo) in Novokopylovsky Selsoviet, Zarinsky District, Altai Krai, Russia. The population was 263 as of 2013. There are 4 streets.

== Geography ==
Smirnovo is located 25 km west of Zarinsk (the district's administrative centre) by road. Novokopylovo is the nearest rural locality.
