= Kucherovka =

Kucherovka Кучеровка
- Selo
- Location within Altai Krai Location within Russia
- Coordinates: 50°54′N 81°43′E
- Country: Russia
- Region: Altai Krai
- District: Loktevsky District
- Time zone: UTC+7:00

Kucherovka (Russian: Кучеровка) is a rural locality (a selo) in Masalsky Selsoviet, Loktevsky District, Altai Krai, Russia. The population was 71 as of 2013. There is 1 street.

== Geography ==
Kucherovka is located 36 km southeast of Gornyak (the district's administrative centre) by road. Masalsky is the nearest rural locality.
