= Novye Zori =

Rural settlement in Altai Krai, Russia

Novye Zori Новые Зори
- Settlement
- Location within Altai Krai Location within Russia
- Coordinates: 53°14′N 83°26′E
- Country: Russia
- Region: Altai Krai
- District: Pavlovsky District
- Time zone: UTC+7:00

Novye Zori (Russian: Новые Зори) is a rural locality (a settlement) and the administrative center of Novozorinsky Selsoviet, Pavlovsky District, Altai Krai, Russia. The population was 3,299 as of 2013. There are 38 streets.

== Geography ==
Novye Zori is located 41 km southeast of Pavlovsk (the district's administrative centre) by road. Komsomolsky and Lesnoy are the nearest rural localities.
