= Zheleznodorozhnaya Kazarma 498 km =

Zheleznodorozhnaya Kazarma 498 km Железнодорожная Казарма 498 км
- Station
- Location within Altai Krai Location within Russia
- Coordinates: 51°35′N 81°15′E
- Country: Russia
- Region: Altai Krai
- District: Rubtsovsky District
- Time zone: UTC+7:00

Zheleznodorozhnaya Kazarma 498 km (Russian: Железнодорожная Казарма 498 км) is a rural locality (a station) in Bezrukavsky Selsoviet, Rubtsovsky District, Altai Krai, Russia. The population was 1 as of 2013. There is 1 street.
