= Staraya Taraba =

Staraya Taraba Старая Тараба
- Selo
- Location within Altai Krai Location within Russia
- Coordinates: 53°24′N 85°29′E
- Country: Russia
- Region: Altai Krai
- District: Kytmanovsky District
- Time zone: UTC+7:00

Staraya Taraba (Russian: Старая Тараба) is a rural locality (a selo) in Kytmanovsky Selsoviet, Kytmanovsky District, Altai Krai, Russia. The population was 377 as of 2013. There are 5 streets.

== Geography ==
Staraya Taraba is located 8 km south of Kytmanovo (the district's administrative centre) by road, on the Taraba River. Ulus-Taraba and Kytmanovo are the nearest rural localities.
