= Verkh-Borovlyanka =

Rural locality in Rebrikhinsky District, Russia

Coordinates: 53°12′N 82°12′E

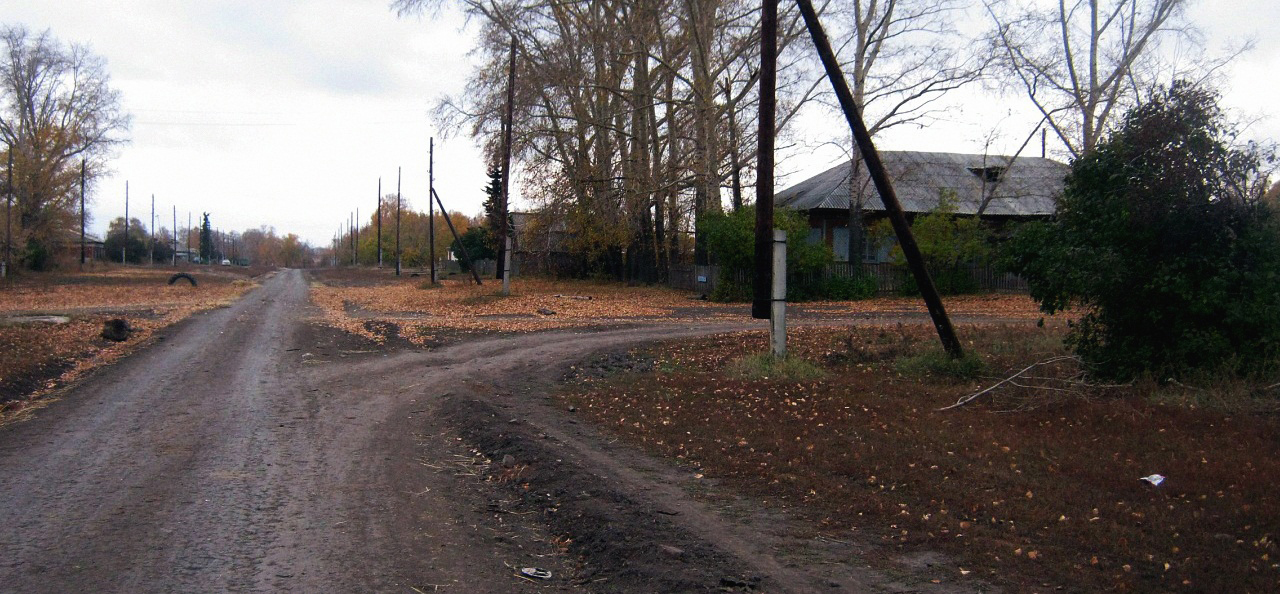
Community center in Verkh-Borovlyanka, October 2010

Verkh-Borovlyanka (Russian: Верх-Боровля́нка) is a rural locality (a settlement) in Rebrikhinsky District of Altai Krai, Russia, located on the Priobskoye Plateau. Population: 238 (2010).

== History ==
It was founded in 1926.

== Climate ==
Verkh-Borovlyanka has a humid continental climate (Dfb) with frigid winters, warm to hot summers, and relatively low precipitation.

Climate data for Verkh-Bororvlyanka
Month	Jan	Feb	Mar	Apr	May	Jun	Jul	Aug	Sep	Oct	Nov	Dec	Year
Mean daily maximum °C (°F)	−11.3 (11.7)	−9.8 (14.4)	−2.6 (27.3)	8.8 (47.8)	18.8 (65.8)	24.4 (75.9)	26.3 (79.3)	23.5 (74.3)	17.9 (64.2)	7.5 (45.5)	−3 (27)	−9.4 (15.1)	7.6 (45.7)
Mean daily minimum °C (°F)	−21.2 (−6.2)	−21 (−6)	−13.9 (7.0)	−2.4 (27.7)	5.1 (41.2)	11 (52)	13.3 (55.9)	10.7 (51.3)	5.1 (41.2)	−1.7 (28.9)	−11.4 (11.5)	−18.6 (−1.5)	−3.7 (25.2)
Average precipitation mm (inches)	26 (1.0)	21 (0.8)	19 (0.7)	30 (1.2)	45 (1.8)	47 (1.9)	65 (2.6)	47 (1.9)	40 (1.6)	41 (1.6)	38 (1.5)	37 (1.5)	456 (18.1)
Source: chinci.com
