= Raygorod =

Raygorod Райгород
- Selo
- Location within Altai Krai Location within Russia
- Coordinates: 52°51′N 78°24′E
- Country: Russia
- Region: Altai Krai
- District: Slavgorod
- Time zone: UTC+7:00

Raygorod (Russian: Райгород) is a rural locality (a selo) in Slavgorod, Altai Krai, Russia. The population was 133 as of 2013. There is 1 street.
