= Aynak, Altai Krai =

Aynak Айнак
- Station
- Location within Altai Krai Location within Russia
- Coordinates: 53°11′N 78°28′E
- Country: Russia
- Region: Altai Krai
- District: Slavgorod
- Time zone: UTC+7:00

Aynak (Russian: Айнак) is a rural locality (a station) in Slavgorod, Altai Krai, Russia. The population was 10 as of 2013.
