= Chernavka, Burlinsky District, Altai Krai =

Chernavka Чернавка
- Selo
- Location within Altai Krai Location within Russia
- Coordinates: 53°10′N 78°09′E
- Country: Russia
- Region: Altai Krai
- District: Burlinsky District
- Time zone: UTC+7:00

Chernavka (Russian: Чернавка) is a rural locality (a selo) in Orekhovsky Selsoviet, Burlinsky District, Altai Krai, Russia. The population was 123 as of 2013. It was founded in 1912. There are 2 streets.

== Geography ==
Chernavka is located 33 km southwest of Burla (the district's administrative centre) by road. Orekhovo and Tsvetopol are the nearest rural localities.
