= Korbolikha =

Korbolikha Корболиха
- Selo
- Location within Altai Krai Location within Russia
- Coordinates: 51°05′N 81°57′E
- Country: Russia
- Region: Altai Krai
- District: Tretyakovsky District
- Time zone: UTC+7:00

Korbolikha (Russian: Корболиха) is a rural locality (a selo) and the administrative center of Korbolikhinsky Selsoviet, Tretyakovsky District, Altai Krai, Russia. The population was 1,281 as of 2013. There are 13 streets.

== Geography ==
Korbolikha is located 14 km north of Staroaleyskoye (the district's administrative centre) by road. Staroaleyskoye is the nearest rural locality.
