= Firsovo =

Firsovo Фирсово
- Selo
- Location within Altai Krai Location within Russia
- Coordinates: 53°18′N 83°57′E
- Country: Russia
- Region: Altai Krai
- District: Pervomaysky District
- Time zone: UTC+7:00

Firsovo (Russian: Фирсово) is a rural locality (a selo) in Sannikovsky Selsoviet, Pervomaysky District, Altai Krai, Russia. The population was 807 as of 2013. There are 80 streets.

== Geography ==
Firsovo is located 14 km south of Novoaltaysk (the district's administrative centre) by road. Firsovo-2 is the nearest rural locality.
