= Zheleznodorozhnaya Kazarma 512 km =

Zheleznodorozhnaya Kazarma 512 km Железнодорожная Казарма 512 км
- Station
- Location within Altai Krai Location within Russia
- Coordinates: 51°28′N 81°10′E
- Country: Russia
- Region: Altai Krai
- District: Rubtsovsky District
- Time zone: UTC+7:00

Zheleznodorozhnaya Kazarma 512 km (Russian: Железнодорожная Казарма 512 км) is a rural locality (a station) in Rubtsovsky Selsoviet, Rubtsovsky District, Altai Krai, Russia. The population was 23 as of 2013. There is only 1 street.
