= Vlasikha (station), Altai Krai =

Vlasikha Власиха
- Station
- Location within Altai Krai Location within Russia
- Coordinates: 53°17′N 83°37′E
- Country: Russia
- Region: Altai Krai
- District: Barnaul
- Time zone: UTC+7:00

Vlasikha (Russian: Власиха) is a rural locality (a station) in Barnaul, Altai Krai, Russia. The population was 57 as of 2013.
