= Katkovo =

Locality in Bobkovsky Selsoviet, Rubtsovsky District, Altai Krai, Russia

Katkovo Катково
- Selo
- Location within Altai Krai Location within Russia
- Coordinates: 51°39′23″N 81°27′40″E
- Country: Russia
- Region: Altai Krai
- District: Rubtsovsky District
- Time zone: UTC+7:00

Katkovo (Russian: Катково) is a rural locality (a selo) in Bobkovsky Selsoviet, Rubtsovsky District, Altai Krai, Russia. The population was 371 as of 2013. There are 6 streets.

== Geography ==
Katkovo is located 33 km northeast of Rubtsovsk (the district's administrative centre) by road. Posyolok imeni Kalinina is the nearest rural locality.
