= Novozyryanovo =

Novozyryanovo Новозыряново
- Selo
- Location within Altai Krai Location within Russia
- Coordinates: 53°48′N 84°54′E
- Country: Russia
- Region: Altai Krai
- District: Zarinsky District
- Time zone: UTC+7:00

Novozyryanovo (Russian: Новозыряново) is a rural locality (a selo) and the administrative center of Novozyryanovsky Selsoviet, Zarinsky District, Altai Krai, Russia. The population was 538 as of 2013. There are 9 streets.

== Geography ==
Novozyryanovo is located 20 km north of Zarinsk (the district's administrative centre) by road. Zarinsk is the nearest rural locality.
