= Golubtsovo, Pervomaysky District, Altai Krai =

Golubtsovo Голубцово
- Passing loop
- Location within Altai Krai Location within Russia
- Coordinates: 53°31′N 84°20′E
- Country: Russia
- Region: Altai Krai
- District: Pervomaysky District
- Time zone: UTC+7:00

Golubtsovo (Russian: Голубцово) is a rural locality (a passing loop) in Logovskoy Selsoviet, Pervomaysky District, Altai Krai, Russia. The population was 37 as of 2013. There are 2 streets.

== Geography ==
Golubtsovo is located 51 km northeast of Novoaltaysk (the district's administrative centre) by road. Novokopylovo is the nearest rural locality.
