= Tizek =

Tizek Тизек
- Settlement
- Location within Altai Krai Location within Russia
- Coordinates: 52°35′N 79°50′E
- Country: Russia
- Region: Altai Krai
- District: Rodinsky District
- Time zone: UTC+7:00

Tizek (Russian: Тизек) is a rural locality (a settlement) in Razdolnensky Selsoviet, Rodinsky District, Altai Krai, Russia. The population was 104 as of 2013. There are 3 streets.

== Geography ==
Tizek is located 50 km northwest of Rodino (the district's administrative centre) by road. Razumovka is the nearest rural locality.
