= Maloyeniseyskoye =

Maloyeniseyskoye Малоенисейское
- Selo
- Location within Altai Krai Location within Russia
- Coordinates: 52°34′N 85°30′E
- Country: Russia
- Region: Altai Krai
- District: Biysky District
- Time zone: UTC+7:00

Maloyeniseyskoye (Russian: Малоенисейское) is a rural locality (a selo) and the administrative centre of Maloyeniseysky Selsoviet, Biysky District, Altai Krai, Russia. The population was 2,181 as of 2013. There are 20 streets.

== Geography ==
Maloyeniseyskoye is located 23 km east of Biysk (the district's administrative centre) by road. Yeniseyskoye is the nearest rural locality.
