= Belmesyovo =

Belmesyovo Бельмесёво
- Settlement
- Location within Altai Krai Location within Russia
- Coordinates: 53°12′N 83°41′E
- Country: Russia
- Region: Altai Krai
- District: Barnaul
- Time zone: UTC+7:00

Belmesyovo (Russian: Бельмесёво) is a rural locality (a settlement) in Barnaul, Altai Krai, Russia. The population was 1,778 as of 2013. There are 98 streets.

== Geography ==
Belmesyovo is located 21 km south of Barnaul by road. Sibirskaya Dolina is the nearest rural locality.
