= Maly Bashchelak =

Maly Bashchelak Малый Бащелак
- Selo
- Location within Altai Krai Location within Russia
- Coordinates: 51°29′N 83°49′E
- Country: Russia
- Region: Altai Krai
- District: Charyshsky District
- Time zone: UTC+7:00

Maly Bashchelak (Russian: Малый Бащелак) is a rural locality (a selo) and the administrative center of Malobashchelaksky Selsoviet, Charyshsky District, Altai Krai, Russia. The population was 836 as of 2013. There are 24 streets.

== Geography ==
Maly Bashchelak is located 28 km northeast of Charyshskoye (the district's administrative centre) by road. Bolshoy Bashchelak is the nearest rural locality.
