= Orlean, Altai Krai =

Orlean Орлеан
- Selo
- Location within Altai Krai Location within Russia
- Coordinates: 52°41′N 79°35′E
- Country: Russia
- Region: Altai Krai
- District: Blagoveshchensky District
- Time zone: UTC+7:00

Orlean (Russian: Орлеан) is a rural locality (a selo) and the administrative center of Orleansky Selsoviet, Blagoveshchensky District, Altai Krai, Russia. The population was 525 as of 2013.

== Geography ==
Orlean lies in the Kulunda Steppe, 5 kilometers (3.1 mi) to the west of lake Kuchuk, 11 kilometers (6.8 mi) to the ENE of lake Dzhira and 8 kilometers (5.0 mi) to the southeast of lake Bauzhansor. It is located 30 km southwest of Blagoveshchenka (the district's administrative centre) by road. Yagotino is the nearest rural locality.
