= Yagotino =

Yagotino Яготино
- Selo
- Location within Altai Krai Location within Russia
- Coordinates: 52°44′N 79°37′E
- Country: Russia
- Region: Altai Krai
- District: Blagoveshchensky District
- Time zone: UTC+7:00

Yagotino (Russian: Яготино) is a rural locality (a selo) and the administrative center of Yagotinsky Selsoviet, Blagoveshchensky District, Altai Krai, Russia. The population was 600 as of 2013. It was founded in 1909. There are 8 streets.

== Geography ==
Yagotino lies in the Kulunda Steppe, 3 kilometers (1.9 mi) to the west of lake Kuchuk and 8 kilometers (5.0 mi) to the east of lake Bauzhansor. It is located 23 km southwest of Blagoveshchenka (the district's administrative centre) by road. Orlean is the nearest rural locality.
