= Zlatopol, Altai Krai =

Zlatopol Златополь
- Selo
- Location within Altai Krai Location within Russia
- Coordinates: 52°37′N 79°15′E
- Country: Russia
- Region: Altai Krai
- District: Kulundinsky District
- Time zone: UTC+7:00

Zlatopol (Russian: Златополь) is a rural locality (a selo) and the administrative center of Zlatopolinsky Selsoviet, Kulundinsky District, Altai Krai, Russia. The population was 700 as of 2013. There are 8 streets.

== Geography ==
Zlatopol lies in the Kulunda Steppe, 6 kilometers (3.7 mi) to the north of lake Gorkiye Kilty and 11 kilometers (6.8 mi) to the west of Bolshoye Shklo. It is located 29 kilometers (18 mi) northeast of Kulunda (the district's administrative centre) by road. Sergeyevka is the nearest rural locality.
