= Vozdvizhenka (rural locality) =

Vozdvizhenka (Russian: Воздвиженка) is the name of several rural localities (selos, villages, and settlements) in Russia:

- Vozdvizhenka, Altai Krai, a selo in Vozdvizhensky Selsoviet of Kulundinsky District of Altai Krai
- Vozdvizhenka, Alsheyevsky District, Republic of Bashkortostan, a selo in Vozdvizhensky Selsoviet of Alsheyevsky District of the Republic of Bashkortostan
- Vozdvizhenka, Khaybullinsky District, Republic of Bashkortostan, a village in Makansky Selsoviet of Khaybullinsky District of the Republic of Bashkortostan
- Vozdvizhenka, Tuymazinsky District, Republic of Bashkortostan, a village in Gafurovsky Selsoviet of Tuymazinsky District of the Republic of Bashkortostan
- Vozdvizhenka, Agapovsky District, Chelyabinsk Oblast, a settlement in Svetlogorsky Selsoviet of Agapovsky District of Chelyabinsk Oblast
- Vozdvizhenka, Kaslinsky District, Chelyabinsk Oblast, a settlement in Vozdvizhensky Selsoviet of Kaslinsky District of Chelyabinsk Oblast
- Vozdvizhenka, Krasnoyarsk Krai, a village in Stretensky Selsoviet of Nizhneingashsky District of Krasnoyarsk Krai
- Vozdvizhenka, Polovinsky District, Kurgan Oblast, a village in Privolnensky Selsoviet of Polovinsky District of Kurgan Oblast
- Vozdvizhenka, Tselinny District, Kurgan Oblast, a village in Polovinsky Selsoviet of Tselinny District of Kurgan Oblast
- Vozdvizhenka, Lipetsk Oblast, a village in Naberezhansky Selsoviet of Volovsky District of Lipetsk Oblast
- Vozdvizhenka, Moscow Oblast, a village in Vasilyevskoye Rural Settlement of Serpukhovsky District of Moscow Oblast
- Vozdvizhenka, Nizhny Novgorod Oblast, a village in Naruksovsky Selsoviet of Pochinkovsky District of Nizhny Novgorod Oblast
- Vozdvizhenka, Novosibirsk Oblast, a village in Tatarsky District of Novosibirsk Oblast
- Vozdvizhenka, Asekeyevsky District, Orenburg Oblast, a selo in Vozdvizhensky Selsoviet of Asekeyevsky District of Orenburg Oblast
- Vozdvizhenka, Belyayevsky District, Orenburg Oblast, a settlement in Razdolny Selsoviet of Belyayevsky District of Orenburg Oblast
- Vozdvizhenka, Ponomaryovsky District, Orenburg Oblast, a selo in Vozdvizhensky Selsoviet of Ponomaryovsky District of Orenburg Oblast
- Vozdvizhenka, Saraktashsky District, Orenburg Oblast, a selo in Vozdvizhensky Selsoviet of Saraktashsky District of Orenburg Oblast
- Vozdvizhenka, Oryol Oblast, a village in Surovsky Selsoviet of Novoderevenkovsky District of Oryol Oblast
- Vozdvizhenka, Primorsky Krai, a selo under the administrative jurisdiction of Ussuriysk City Under Krai Jurisdiction, Primorsky Krai
- Vozdvizhenka, Ryazan Oblast, a village in Novinsky Rural Okrug of Skopinsky District of Ryazan Oblast
- Vozdvizhenka, Chelno-Vershinsky District, Samara Oblast, a settlement in Chelno-Vershinsky District, Samara Oblast
- Vozdvizhenka, Krasnoarmeysky District, Samara Oblast, a selo in Krasnoarmeysky District, Samara Oblast
- Vozdvizhenka, Saratov Oblast, a selo in Samoylovsky District of Saratov Oblast
- Vozdvizhenka, Republic of Tatarstan, a settlement in Leninogorsky District of the Republic of Tatarstan
