= Kulunda =

Kulunda may refer to:

- Kulunda (village), a settlement in Altai Krai, Russia.
- Kulunda District, a district of Altai Krai, Russia.
- Kulunda (river), a course of water in the Ob Plateau.
- Kulunda Main Canal, an irrigation canal in the Ob Plateau.
- Kulunda Steppe, an alluvial plain in Russia and Kazakhstan.
- Lake Kulunda, a lake in Altai Krai, Russia.
