= Yagotinskaya =

Yagotinskaya Яготинская
- Station
- Location within Altai Krai Location within Russia
- Coordinates: 52°43′N 79°31′E
- Country: Russia
- Region: Altai Krai
- District: Blagoveshchensky District
- Time zone: UTC+7:00

Yagotinskaya (Russian: Яготинская) is a rural locality (a station) in Yagotinsky Selsoviet, Blagoveshchensky District, Altai Krai, Russia. The population was 26 as of 2013. There is 1 street.

== Geography ==
Yagotinskaya lies in the Kulunda Steppe, 2 kilometers (1.2 mi) to the southeast of lake Bauzhansor and 8 kilometers (5.0 mi) to the northeast of lake Dzhira. It is located 29 km southwest of Blagoveshchenka (the district's administrative centre) by road. Yagotino is the nearest rural locality.
