= Konstantinovka, Kulundinsky District, Altai Krai =

Konstantinovka Константиновка
- Selo
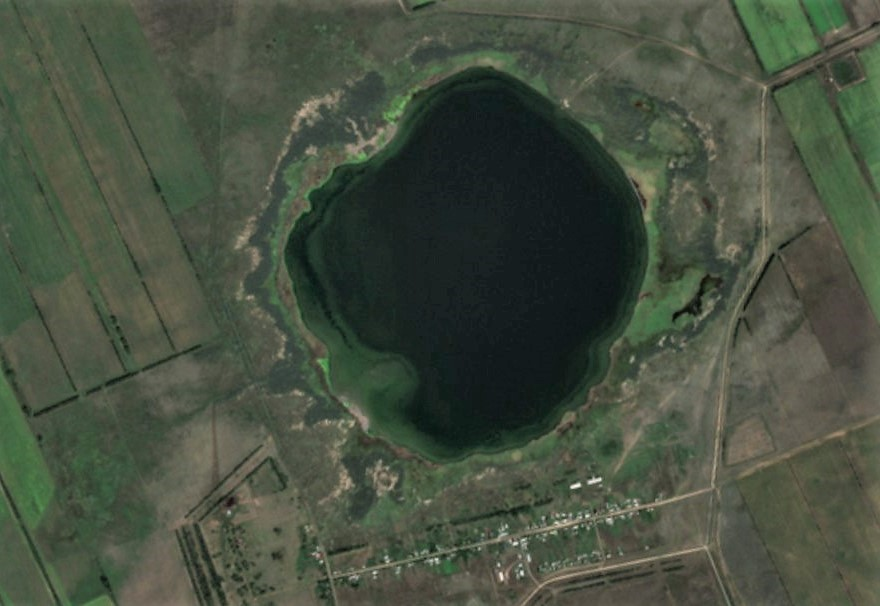
- Konstantinovka on the southern shore of the lake Sentinel-2 image

- Location within Altai Krai Location within Russia
- Coordinates: 52°37′N 79°04′E
- Country: Russia
- Region: Altai Krai
- District: Kulundinsky District
- Time zone: UTC+7:00

Konstantinovka (Russian: Константиновка) is a rural locality (a selo) and the administrative center of Konstantinovsky Selsoviet, Kulundinsky District, Altai Krai, Russia. The population was 344 as of 2013. There are 4 streets.

== Geography ==
Konstantinovka lies in the Kulunda Steppe by lake Bolshoye Shklo-Ushkaly to the north. It is located 18 km northeast of Kulunda (the district's administrative centre) by road. Myshkino is the nearest rural locality.
