= Telmansky =

Telmansky Тельманский
- Settlement
- Location within Altai Krai Location within Russia
- Coordinates: 52°47′N 79°32′E
- Country: Russia
- Region: Altai Krai
- District: Blagoveshchensky District
- Time zone: UTC+7:00

Telmansky (Russian: Тельманский) is a rural locality (a settlement) in Yagotinsky Selsoviet, Blagoveshchensky District, Altai Krai, Russia. The population was 330 as of 2013. There are 3 streets.

== Geography ==
Telmansky lies in the Kulunda Steppe, 3 kilometers (1.9 mi) to the southwest of lake Kulunda, 6 kilometers (3.7 mi) to the east of lake Zhigilda and 5 kilometers (3.1 mi) to the northeast of lake Bauzhansor. It is located 31 km west of Blagoveshchenka (the district's administrative centre) by road. Yagotino is the nearest rural locality.
