= Dzhira =

Salt lake in Altai Krai, Russia

Zhira
- Жира
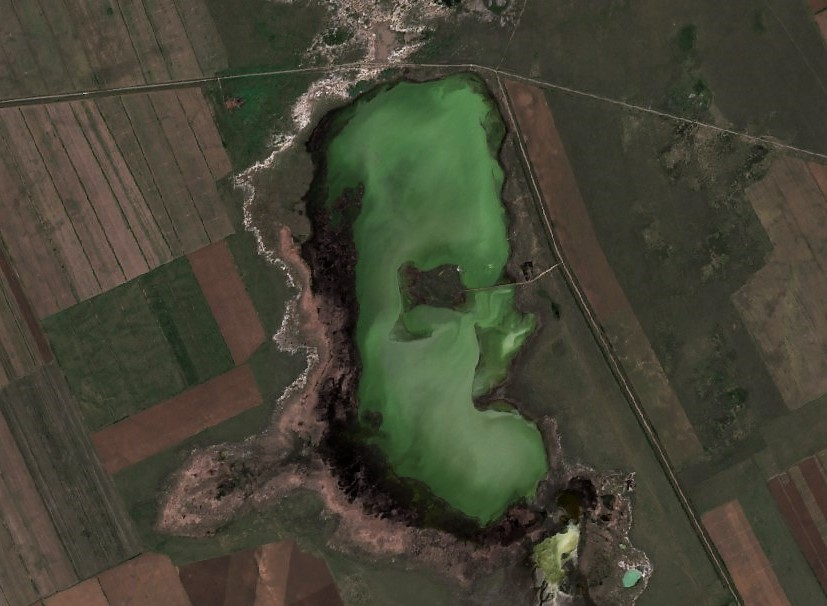
- Sentinel-2 image of the lake

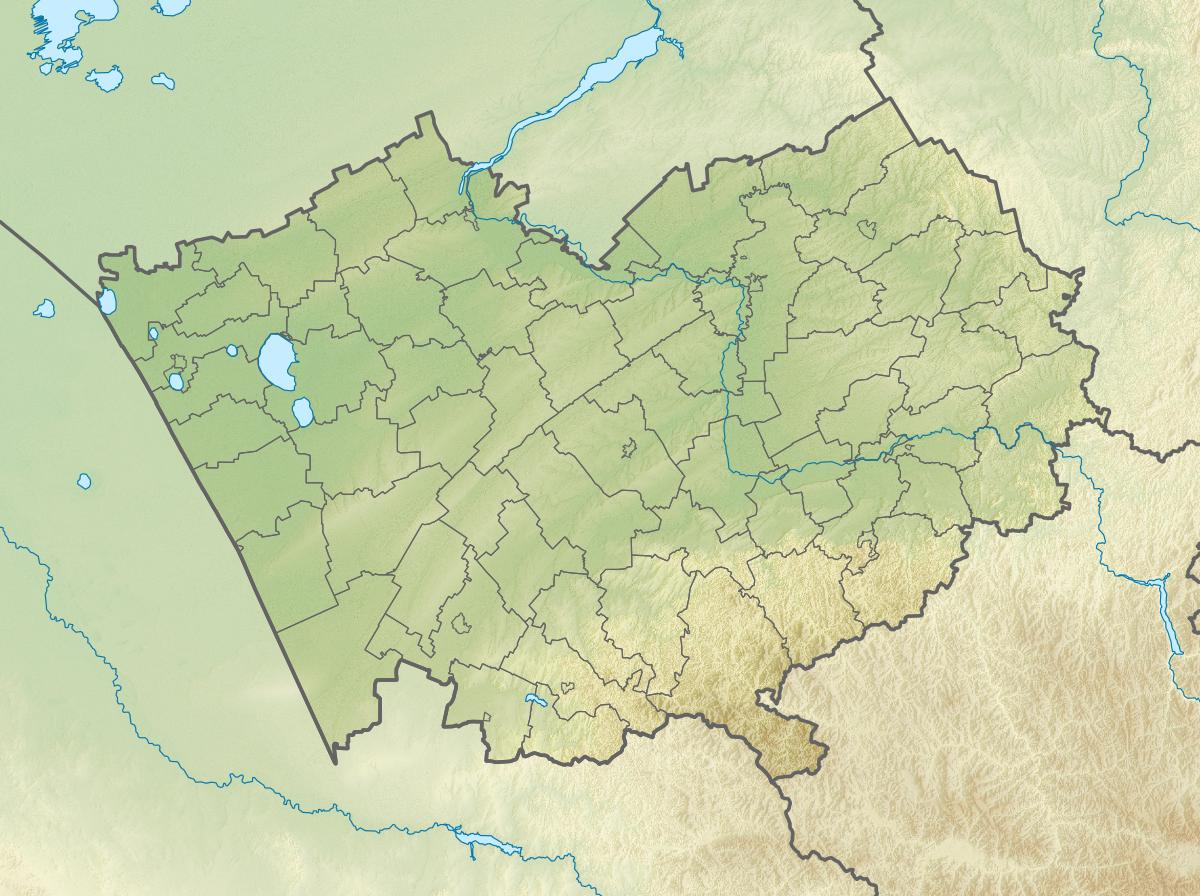
- Location within Altai Krai Location within Russia
- Location: Kulunda Steppe; West Siberian Plain
- Coordinates: 52°38′41″N 79°25′02″E
- Type: endorheic
- Basin countries: Russia
- Max. length: 5.1 kilometers (3.2 mi)
- Max. width: 1.7 kilometers (1.1 mi)
- Surface area: 7.8 square kilometers (3.0 sq mi)
- Residence time: UTC+7
- Islands: One

Zhira (Russian: Жира), Dzhira (Russian: Джира) or Dzhiry (Russian: Джиры), is a salt lake in Kulundinsky District, Altai Krai, Russian Federation.

The lake is located in the western part of the Krai. The nearest inhabited places are Sergeyevka, 5.5 kilometers (3.4 mi) to the west, Yagotinskaya, 8 kilometers (5.0 mi) to the northeast, and Ananyevka 9 kilometers (5.6 mi) to the southeast. Kulunda, the district capital, lies 31 kilometers (19 mi) to the WSW.

There are large gypsum deposits at the lake estimated at about 9,000,000 metric tons (8,900,000 long tons; 9,900,000 short tons). The gypsum is of good quality, not containing harmful impurities and not caking during storage. At the time of the USSR the Ministry of the Medical Industry built a plant on the shore of lake Zhira for the extraction of raw gypsum. The project was, however, abandoned. The plant never began to operate and was subsequently mothballed and destroyed.

== Geography ==
Zhira is located in a residual depression of the Kulunda Plain. It is one of the largest lakes in the district, with a length of 5 kilometers (3.1 mi) stretching from north to south. The lakeshore is fringed by salt pans, especially on the eastern side. A fairly large lone island in the middle part of the lake is 0.7 kilometers (0.43 mi) across.

Lake Gorkiye Kilty lies 12 kilometers (7.5 mi) to the southwest, Bauzhansor 7 kilometers (4.3 mi) to the north, Kuchuk 18 kilometers (11 mi) to the east, Kulunda 21 kilometers (13 mi) to the northeast, and Bolshoye Shklo 22 kilometers (14 mi) to the west.

== Flora and fauna ==
The lake is surrounded by flat steppe landscape and cultivated fields.

== See also ==
- List of lakes of Russia
