= Kilty, Altai Krai =

Kilty Кильты
- Passing loop
- Location within Altai Krai Location within Russia
- Coordinates: 52°36′N 79°07′E
- Country: Russia
- Region: Altai Krai
- District: Kulundinsky District
- Time zone: UTC+7:00

Kilty (Russian: Кильты) is a rural locality (a passing loop) in Konstantinovsky Selsoviet, Kulundinsky District, Altai Krai, Russia. The population was 10 as of 2013. There is 1 street.

== Geography ==
Kilty is located 17 km northeast of Kulunda (the district's administrative centre) by road. Konstantinovka is the nearest rural locality.
