= Zhigilda =

Salt lake in Altai Krai, Russia

- Жигилда
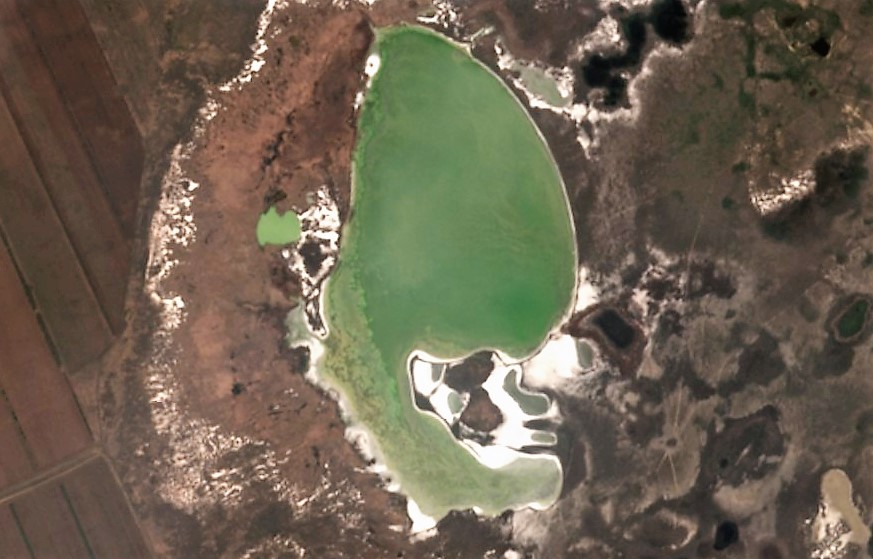
- Sentinel-2 image of the lake

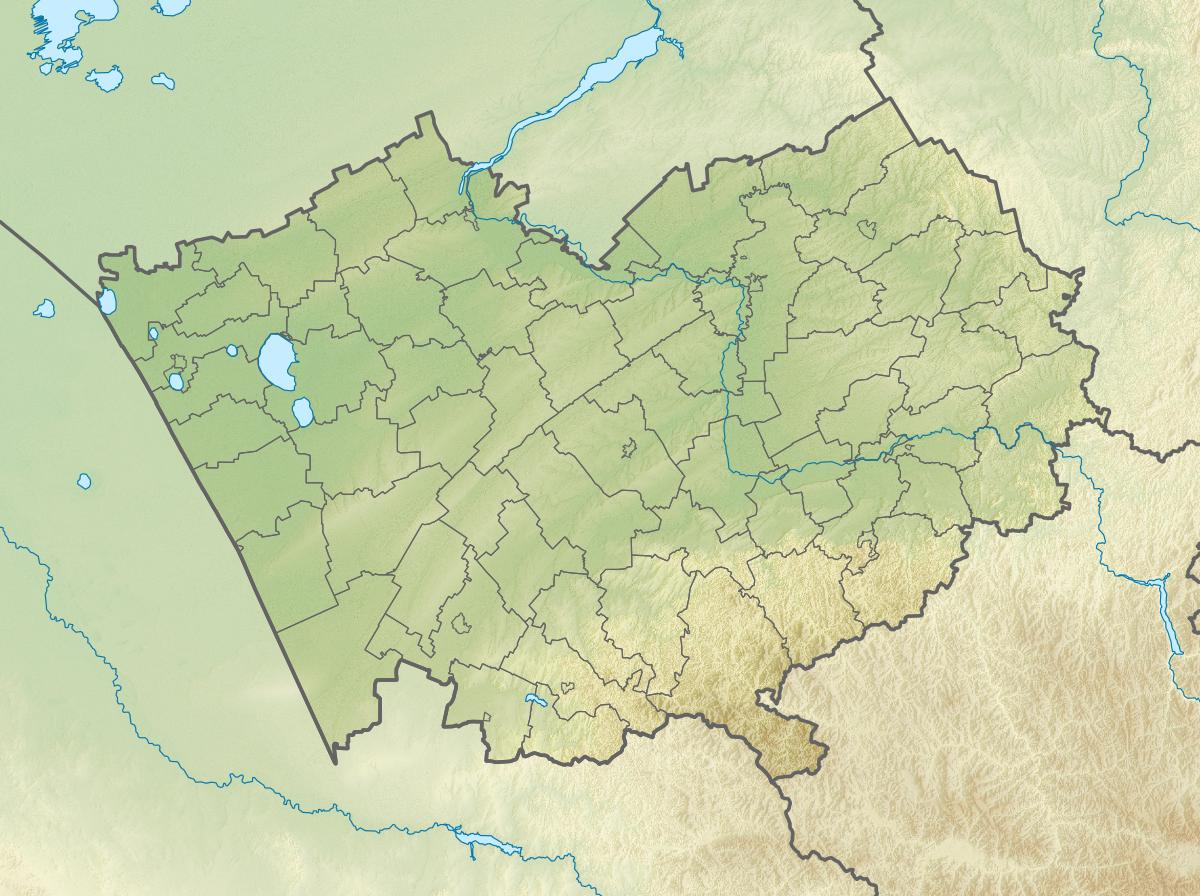
- Location within Altai Krai Location within Russia
- Location: Kulunda Steppe; West Siberian Plain
- Coordinates: 52°48′30″N 79°25′35″E
- Type: endorheic
- Basin countries: Russia
- Max. length: 3.2 kilometers (2.0 mi)
- Max. width: 1.5 kilometers (0.93 mi)
- Surface area: 5.9 square kilometers (2.3 sq mi)
- Residence time: UTC+7
- Surface elevation: 98 meters (322 ft)
- Settlements: Telmansky and Yelizavetgrad

Zhigilda (Russian: Жигилда) is a salt lake in Blagoveshchensky District, Altai Krai, Russian Federation.

The lake is located in the western part of the Krai. The nearest inhabited places are Yelizavetgrad, Telmansky and Lebedino. Blagoveshchenka, the district capital, lies 23 kilometers (14 mi) to the east. The border with Tabunsky District runs along the western lakeshore.

== Geography ==
Located in the Kulunda Plain, Zhigilda has an elongated shape. It stretches for approximately 3 kilometers (1.9 mi) from north to south and has a peninsula in the southeastern lakeshore that narrows the southern end to a width averaging 0.4 kilometers (0.25 mi).

Lake Bauzhansor lies 3 kilometers (1.9 mi) to the SSE, Kulunda 6 kilometers (3.7 mi) to the northeast, Kuchuk 17 kilometers (11 mi) to the ESE, and Maloye Yarovoye 28 kilometers (17 mi) to the northwest.

== Flora and fauna ==
The lake is surrounded by flat steppe landscape and salt pans. There are cultivated fields about 1 kilometer (0.62 mi) away from the western side. The small crustaceans Artemia salina live in the lake and are periodically harvested for commercial purposes.

== See also ==
- List of lakes of Russia
