= Novopetrovka, Altai Krai =

Novopetrovka Новопетровка
- Selo
- Location within Altai Krai Location within Russia
- Coordinates: 52°32′N 78°54′E
- Country: Russia
- Region: Altai Krai
- District: Kulundinsky District
- Time zone: UTC+7:00

Novopetrovka (Russian: Новопетровка) is a rural locality (a selo) in Oktyabrsky Selsoviet, Kulundinsky District, Altai Krai, Russia. The population was 378 as of 2013. There are 3 streets.

== Geography ==
Novopetrovka lies in the Kulunda Steppe, near lake Shchekulduk to the west. It is located 7 km southwest of Kulunda (the district's administrative centre) by road. Kulunda is the nearest rural locality.
