= Kirey =

Kirey Кирей
- Selo
- Location within Altai Krai Location within Russia
- Coordinates: 52°31′N 79°04′E
- Country: Russia
- Region: Altai Krai
- District: Kulundinsky District
- Time zone: UTC+7:00

Kirey (Russian: Кирей) is a rural locality (a selo) in Mirabilitsky Selsoviet, Kulundinsky District, Altai Krai, Russia. The population was 265 as of 2013. There are 3 streets.

== Geography ==
Kirey is located 16 km southeast of Kulunda (the district's administrative centre) by road. Mirabilit is the nearest rural locality.
