= Ozyornoye, Kulundinsky District, Altai Krai =

Ozyornoye Озёрное
- Selo
- Location within Altai Krai Location within Russia
- Coordinates: 52°30′N 79°20′E
- Country: Russia
- Region: Altai Krai
- District: Kulundinsky District
- Time zone: UTC+7:00

Ozyornoye (Russian: Озёрное) is a rural locality (a selo) in Semyonovsky Selsoviet, Kulundinsky District, Altai Krai, Russia. The population was 12 as of 2013. There is 1 street.

== Geography ==
Ozyornoye lies in the Kulunda Steppe, near lake Gorkiye Kilty to the northwest. It is located 32 km southeast of Kulunda (the district's administrative centre) by road. Semyonovka is the nearest rural locality.
