= Oktyabrsky, Kulundinsky District, Altai Krai =

Oktyabrsky Октябрьский
- Settlement
- Location within Altai Krai Location within Russia
- Coordinates: 52°33′N 78°52′E
- Country: Russia
- Region: Altai Krai
- District: Kulundinsky District
- Time zone: UTC+7:00

Oktyabrsky (Russian: Октябрьский) is a rural locality (a settlement) and the administrative center of Oktyabrsky Selsoviet, Kulundinsky District, Altai Krai, Russia. The population was 1,263 as of 2013. There are 15 streets.

== Geography ==
Oktyabrsky lies in the Kulunda Steppe, near lake Shchekulduk to the south. It is located 5 km west of Kulunda (the district's administrative centre) by road. Kulunda is the nearest rural locality.
