= Khoroshavka =

Khoroshavka Хорошавка
- Settlement
- Location within Altai Krai Location within Russia
- Coordinates: 52°52′N 80°17′E
- Country: Russia
- Region: Altai Krai
- District: Blagoveshchensky District
- Time zone: UTC+7:00

Khoroshavka (Russian: Хорошавка) is a rural locality (a settlement) in Suvorovsky Selsoviet, Blagoveshchensky District, Altai Krai, Russia. The population was 126 as of 2013. There are 5 streets.

== Geography ==
Khoroshavka is located 39 km east of Blagoveshchenka (the district's administrative centre) by road. Lenki is the nearest rural locality.
