= Krotovka =

Krotovka Кротовка
- Selo
- Location within Altai Krai Location within Russia
- Coordinates: 52°35′N 78°54′E
- Country: Russia
- Region: Altai Krai
- District: Kulundinsky District
- Time zone: UTC+7:00

Krotovka (Russian: Кротовка) is a rural locality (a selo) in Konstantinovsky Selsoviet, Kulundinsky District, Altai Krai, Russia. The population was 177 as of 2013. There is 1 street.

== Geography ==
Krotovka is located 7 km north of Kulunda (the district's administrative centre) by road. Oktyabrsky and Kulunda are the nearest rural localities.
