= Sergeyevka, Altai Krai =

Sergeyevka Сергеевка
- Selo
- Location within Altai Krai Location within Russia
- Coordinates: 52°39′N 79°18′E
- Country: Russia
- Region: Altai Krai
- District: Kulundinsky District
- Time zone: UTC+7:00

Sergeyevka (Russian: Сергеевка) is a rural locality (a selo) in Zlatopolinsky Selsoviet, Kulundinsky District, Altai Krai, Russia. The population was 152 as of 2013. There is 1 street.

== Geography ==
Sergeyevka lies in the Kulunda Steppe, 5.5 kilometers (3.4 mi) to the west of lake Dzhira. It is located 34 kilometers (21 mi) northeast of Kulunda (the district's administrative centre) by road. Zlatopol is the nearest rural locality.
