= Glyaden-3 =

Glyaden-3 Глядень-3
- Selo
- Location within Altai Krai Location within Russia
- Coordinates: 52°43′N 80°15′E
- Country: Russia
- Region: Altai Krai
- District: Blagoveshchensky District
- Time zone: UTC+7:00

Glyaden-3 (Russian: Глядень-3) is a rural locality (a selo) in Blagoveshchensky District, Altai Krai, Russia. The population was 296 as of 2013. There are 2 streets.

== Geography ==
Glyaden-3 is located 43 km southeast of Blagoveshchenka (the district's administrative centre) by road. Glyaden is the nearest rural locality.
