= Ananyevka =

Ananyevka Ананьевка
- Selo
- Location within Altai Krai Location within Russia
- Coordinates: 52°34′N 79°34′E
- Country: Russia
- Region: Altai Krai
- District: Kulundinsky District
- Time zone: UTC+7:00

Ananyevka (Russian: Ананьевка) is a rural locality (a selo) and the administrative center of Ananyevsky Selsoviet, Kulundinsky District, Altai Krai, Russia. The population was 633 as of 2013. There are 6 streets.

== Geography ==
Ananyevka lies in the Kulunda Steppe, 9 kilometers (5.6 mi) to the southeast of lake Dzhira. It 56 km east of Kulunda (the district's administrative centre) by road. Yekaterinovka is the nearest rural locality.
