= Sukhoy Rakit =

Sukhoy Rakit Сухой Ракит
- Village
- Location within Altai Krai Location within Russia
- Coordinates: 52°53′N 80°03′E
- Country: Russia
- Region: Altai Krai
- District: Blagoveshchensky District
- Time zone: UTC+7:00

Sukhoy Rakit (Russian: Сухой Ракит) is a rural locality (a selo) in Blagoveshchensky District, Altai Krai, Russia. The population was 60 as of 2016. There are 2 streets.

== Geography ==
Sukhoy Rakit is located 16 km northeast of Blagoveshchenka (the district's administrative centre) by road. Nikolayevka is the nearest rural locality.

== Ethnicity ==
The village is inhabited by Russians and others.
