= Bura (lake) =

Lake in Kazakhstan and Russia

- Бура
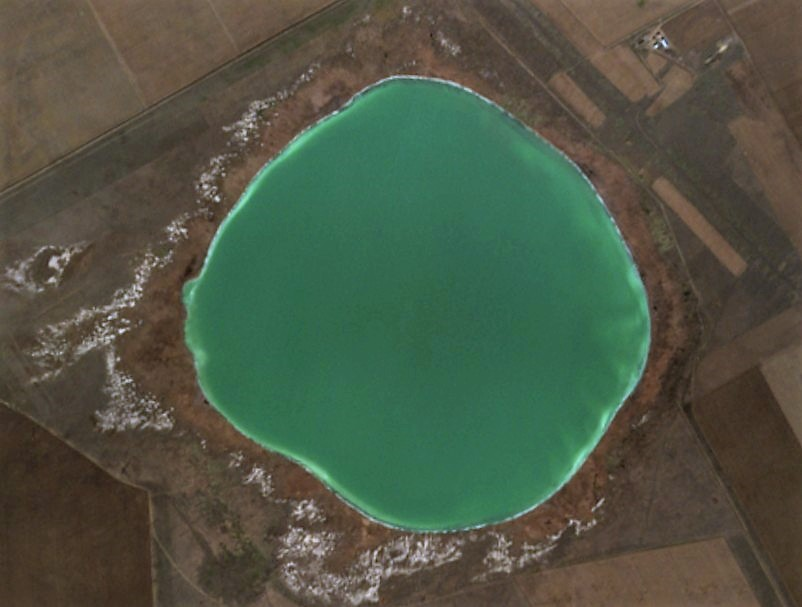
- Lake Bura Sentinel-2 image.

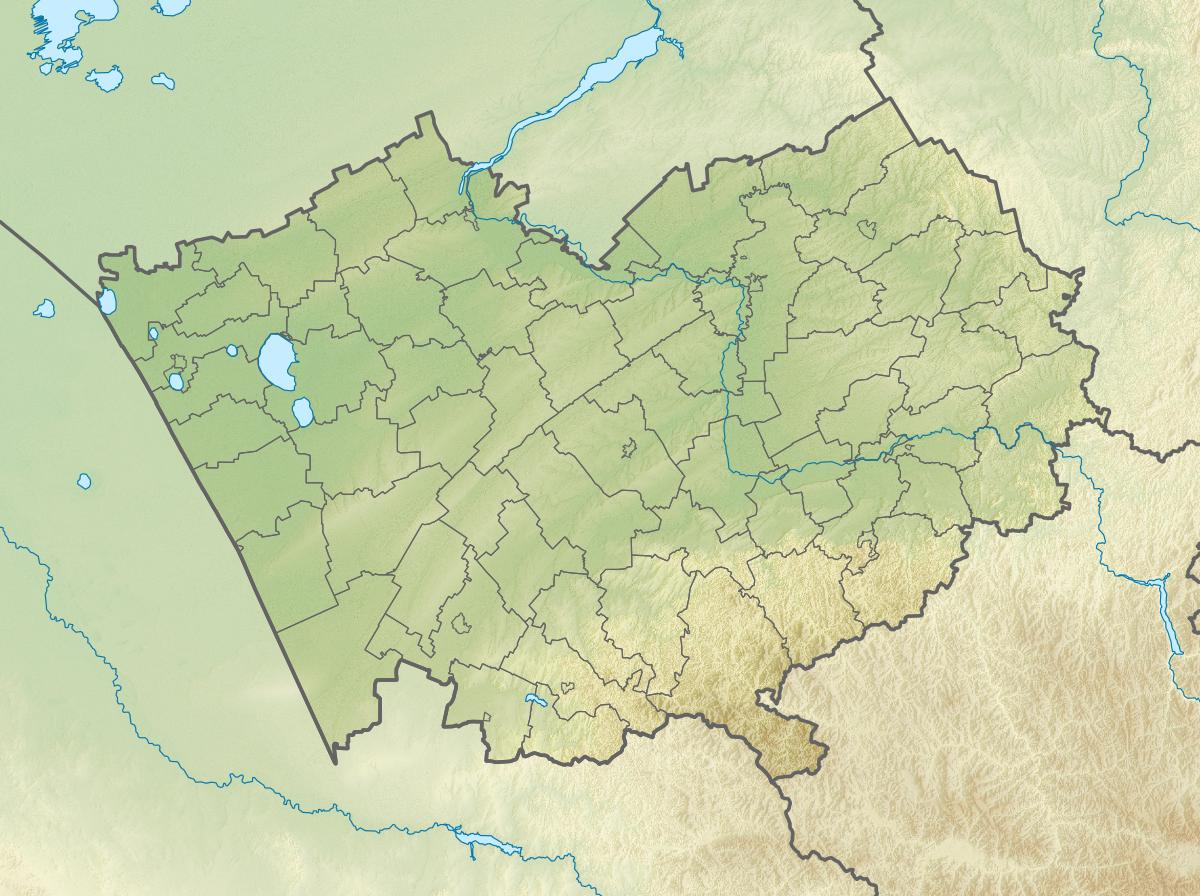
- Location within Kazakhstan Location within Altai Krai
- Location: Kulunda Plain
- Coordinates: 52°39′45″N 78°29′34″E
- Type: Endorheic
- Basin countries: Kazakhstan; Russia
- Max. length: 2.6 kilometers (1.6 mi)
- Max. width: 2.4 kilometers (1.5 mi)
- Surface area: 4.9 square kilometers (1.9 sq mi)
- Residence time: UTC+5
- Surface elevation: 119 meters (390 ft)
- Islands: none
- Settlements: Syntas

Bura (Kazakh: Бура; Russian: Бура) is a salt lake in Sharbakty District, Pavlodar Region, Kazakhstan, with a small part in Kulundinsky District, Altai Krai, Russia.

Lake Bura is located at the Russia-Kazakhstan border, 5 kilometers (3.1 mi) to the east of Syntas village and approximately 28 kilometers (17 mi) northwest of Kulunda village in Russia. Sharbakty, the Kazakh district capital, lies roughly 27 kilometers (17 mi) to the southwest.

== Geography ==
Bura lies in a tectonic depression of the Kulunda Plain. The Kazakhstan–Russia border runs diagonally off the shore across the northeastern end. Most of the lake is within Kazakhstan, but a 0.16 kilometers (0.099 mi) broad segment of lake Bura lies within Russian territory.

The lake has a roughly round shape, with a diameter of about 2.5 kilometers (1.6 mi). The western and southern lakeshore sections are fringed by salt marshes.

Lake Maraldy lies 57 kilometers (35 mi) to the southwest, Shchekulduk 26 kilometers (16 mi) to the southeast, and Bolshoye Yarovoye 21 kilometers (13 mi) to the northeast, the latter two on the other side of the border.

== Flora and fauna ==
Lake Bura is surrounded by steppe vegetation and cultivated fields.

== See also ==
- List of lakes of Kazakhstan
- List of lakes of Russia
