= Gorodetsky (rural locality) =

Gorodetsky (Russian: Городецкий; masculine), Gorodetskaya (Городецкая; feminine), or Gorodetskoye (Городецкое; neuter) is the name of several rural localities in Russia:

- Gorodetsky, Altai Krai, a settlement in Vozdvizhensky Selsoviet of Kulundinsky District of Altai Krai
- Gorodetsky, Nizhny Novgorod Oblast, a settlement in Nikolo-Pogostinsky Selsoviet of Gorodetsky District of Nizhny Novgorod Oblast
- Gorodetskoye, Republic of Bashkortostan, a selo in Beketovsky Selsoviet of Yermekeyevsky District of the Republic of Bashkortostan
- Gorodetskoye, Novgorod Oblast, a village in Morkhovskoye Settlement of Kholmsky District of Novgorod Oblast
- Gorodetskoye, Oryol Oblast, a selo in Yarishchensky Selsoviet of Kolpnyansky District of Oryol Oblast
- Gorodetskoye, Skopinsky District, Ryazan Oblast, a selo in Shelemishevsky Rural Okrug of Skopinsky District of Ryazan Oblast
- Gorodetskoye, Starozhilovsky District, Ryazan Oblast, a village in Stolpnyansky Rural Okrug of Starozhilovsky District of Ryazan Oblast
- Gorodetskoye, Smolensk Oblast, a village in Syrokorenskoye Rural Settlement of Roslavlsky District of Smolensk Oblast
- Gorodetskoye, Ulyanovsk Oblast, a selo in Ignatovsky Settlement Okrug of Maynsky District, Ulyanovsk Oblast
