= Voskresenovka, Altai Krai =

Voskresenovka Воскресеновка
- Selo
- Location within Altai Krai Location within Russia
- Coordinates: 52°25′N 78°53′E
- Country: Russia
- Region: Altai Krai
- District: Kulundinsky District
- Time zone: UTC+7:00

Voskresenovka (Russian: Воскресеновка) is a rural locality (a selo) in Kursky Selsoviet, Kulundinsky District, Altai Krai, Russia. The population was 144 as of 2013. There are 2 streets.

== Geography ==
Voskresenovka is located 18 km south of Kulunda (the district's administrative centre) by road. Kursk is the nearest rural locality.
