= Krasnaya Sloboda, Altai Krai =

Krasnaya Sloboda Красная Слобода
- Selo
- Location within Altai Krai Location within Russia
- Coordinates: 52°40′N 79°13′E
- Country: Russia
- Region: Altai Krai
- District: Kulundinsky District
- Time zone: UTC+7:00

Krasnaya Sloboda (Russian: Красная Слобода) is a rural locality (a selo) in Konstantinovsky Selsoviet, Kulundinsky District, Altai Krai, Russia. The population was 93 as of 2013. There are 3 streets.

== Geography ==
Krasnaya Sloboda is located 31 km northeast of Kulunda (the district's administrative centre) by road. Zlatopol is the nearest rural locality.
