= Kalinovka, Blagoveshchensky District, Altai Krai =

Kalinovka Калиновка
- Settlement
- Location within Altai Krai Location within Russia
- Coordinates: 52°50′N 80°28′E
- Country: Russia
- Region: Altai Krai
- District: Blagoveshchensky District
- Time zone: UTC+7:00

Kalinovka (Russian: Калиновка) is a rural locality (a settlement) in Alexeyevsky Selsoviet, Blagoveshchensky District, Altai Krai, Russia. The population was 64 as of 2013. There are 2 streets.

== Geography ==
Kalinovka is located 62 km east of Blagoveshchenka (the district's administrative centre) by road. Vyacheslavka is the nearest rural locality.
