= Melnikovka =

Melnikovka Мельниковка
- Settlement
- Location within Altai Krai Location within Russia
- Coordinates: 53°09′N 79°57′E
- Country: Russia
- Region: Altai Krai
- District: Blagoveshchensky District
- Time zone: UTC+7:00

Melnikovka (Russian: Мельниковка) is a rural locality (a settlement) in Shimolinsky Selsoviet, Blagoveshchensky District, Altai Krai, Russia. The population was 323 as of 2013. It was founded in 1912. There are three streets.

== Geography ==
Melnikovka is located 48 km north of Blagoveshchenka (the district's administrative centre) by road. Boronsky is the nearest rural locality.
