= Glyaden =

Glyaden (Russian: Глядень) is the name of several rural localities in Russia:

- Glyaden, Altai Krai, a selo in Glyadensky Selsoviet of Blagoveshchensky District of Altai Krai
- Glyaden, Glyadensky Selsoviet, Nazarovsky District, Krasnoyarsk Krai, a settlement in Glyadensky Selsoviet of Nazarovsky District of Krasnoyarsk Krai
- Glyaden, Krasnosopkinsky Selsoviet, Nazarovsky District, Krasnoyarsk Krai, a village in Krasnosopkinsky Selsoviet of Nazarovsky District of Krasnoyarsk Krai
- Glyaden, Novosibirsk Oblast, a village in Moshkovsky District of Novosibirsk Oblast
