= Tatyanovka, Altai Krai =

Tatyanovka Татьяновка
- Settlement
- Location within Altai Krai Location within Russia
- Coordinates: 52°58′N 80°14′E
- Country: Russia
- Region: Altai Krai
- District: Blagoveshchensky District
- Time zone: UTC+7:00

Tatyanovka (Russian: Татьяновка) is a rural locality (a settlement) in Nikolayevsky Selsoviet, Blagoveshchensky District, Altai Krai, Russia. The population was 348 as of 2013. There are two streets.

== Geography ==
Tatyanovka is located 33 km northeast of Blagoveshchenka (the district's administrative centre) by road. Nikolayevka is the nearest rural locality.
