= Kulundinsky =

Kulundinsky (masculine), Kulundinskaya (feminine), or Kulundinskoye (neuter) may refer to:

- Kulundinsky District, a district of Altai Krai, Russia
- Kulundinsky (rural locality), a rural locality (a settlement) in Tyumentsevsky District of Altai Krai, Russia
- Lake Kulunda, a lake in Altai Krai, Russia
