= Novopokrovka, Kulundinsky District, Altai Krai =

Novopokrovka Новопокровка
- Selo
- Location within Altai Krai Location within Russia
- Coordinates: 52°28′N 78°42′E
- Country: Russia
- Region: Altai Krai
- District: Kulundinsky District
- Time zone: UTC+7:00

Novopokrovka (Russian: Новопокровка) is a rural locality (a selo) in Kursky Selsoviet, Kulundinsky District, Altai Krai, Russia. The population was 99 as of 2013. There is 1 street.

== Geography ==
Novopokrovka is located 24 km southwest of Kulunda (the district's administrative centre) by road. Popasnoye is the nearest rural locality.
