= Smirnenkoye =

Smirnenkoye Смирненькое
- Selo
- Location within Altai Krai Location within Russia
- Coordinates: 52°31′N 79°15′E
- Country: Russia
- Region: Altai Krai
- District: Kulundinsky District
- Time zone: UTC+7:00

Smirnenkoye (Russian: Смирненькое) is a rural locality (a selo) in Semyonovsky Selsoviet, Kulundinsky District, Altai Krai, Russia. The population was 316 as of 2013. There are 3 streets.

== Geography ==
Smirnenkoye lies in the Kulunda Steppe, near lake Gorkiye Kilty to the northeast. It is located 24 kilometers (15 mi) east of Kulunda (the district's administrative centre) by road. Semyonovka is the nearest rural locality.
