= Gorodetsky, Altai Krai =

Gorodetsky Городецкий
- Settlement
- Location within Altai Krai Location within Russia
- Coordinates: 52°42′N 78°58′E
- Country: Russia
- Region: Altai Krai
- District: Kulundinsky District
- Time zone: UTC+7:00

Gorodetsky (Russian: Городецкий) is a rural locality (a settlement) in Kulundinsky District, Altai Krai, Russia. The population was 205 as of 2013. There are 2 streets.

== Geography ==
Gorodetsky lies in the Kulunda Steppe, 11 kilometers (6.8 mi) to the northwest of lake Bolshoye Shklo. It is located 22 km north of Kulunda (the district's administrative centre) by road. Vozdvizhenka, Yambor and Kharkovka are the nearest rural localities.
