= Pregradinka =

Pregradinka Преградинка
- Settlement
- Location within Altai Krai Location within Russia
- Coordinates: 52°48′N 80°05′E
- Country: Russia
- Region: Altai Krai
- District: Blagoveshchensky District
- Time zone: UTC+7:00

Pregradinka (Russian: Преградинка) is a rural locality (a settlement) in Suvorovsky Selsoviet, Blagoveshchensky District, Altai Krai, Russia. The population was 336 as of 2013. It was founded in 1912. There are 3 streets.

== Geography ==
Pregradinka is located 21 km southeast of Blagoveshchenka (the district's administrative centre) by road. Suvorovka is the nearest rural locality.
