= Sharbakty =

Sharbakty may refer to:

- Sharbakty District, an administrative division of Pavlodar Region, Kazakhstan
- Sharbakty (Sharbakty District), a village in Pavlodar Region, Kazakhstan
- Sharbakty (Akkuly District), a village in Pavlodar Region, Kazakhstan
- Sharbakty (lake), a lake in the Kulunda Plain, Kazakhstan
