= Vozdvizhenka, Altai Krai =

Vozdvizhenka Воздвиженка
- Village
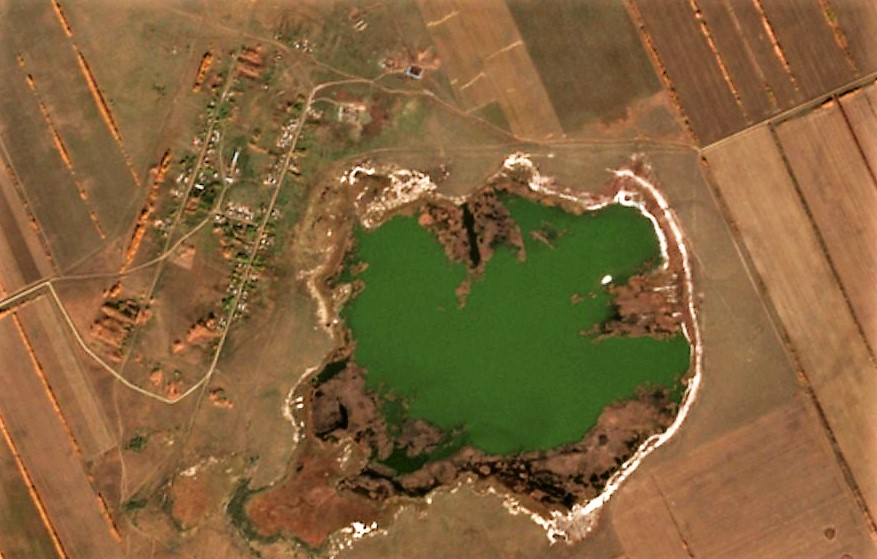
- Vozdvizhenka and lake Sintas Sentinel-2 image.

- Location within Altai Krai Location within Russia
- Coordinates: 52°45′N 79°03′E
- Country: Russia
- Region: Altai Krai
- District: Kulundinsky District
- Rural District: Vozdvizhensky Rural District
- Time zone: UTC+7:00

Vozdvizhenka (Russian: Воздвиженка) is a rural locality (a selo) and the administrative center of Vozdvizhensky Rural District, Kulundinsky District, Altai Krai, Russia. The population was 233 as of 2013. There are two streets.

== Geography ==
Vozdvizhenka lies in the Kulunda Steppe by lake Sintas and 12 kilometers (7.5 mi) to the north of lake Bolshoye Shklo. It is located 34 km north of Kulunda (the district's administrative centre) by road. Novorossiyka is the nearest rural locality.
