= Syntas (Sharbakty District) =

Village in Kazakhstan

Syntas Сынтас
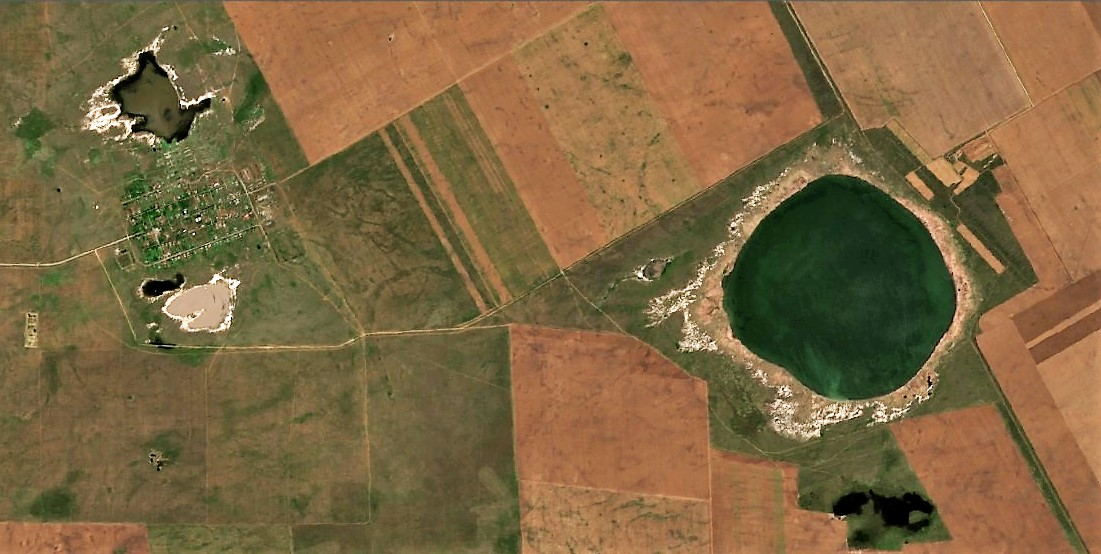
- Sentinel-2 image with Syntas on the left and lake Bura on the right.

- Location in Kazakhstan
- Coordinates: 52°40′14″N 78°22′49″E
- Country: Kazakhstan
- Region: Pavlodar Region
- District: Sharbakty District
- Rural District: Sharbakty Rural District

Population (2009)
  - Total: 357
- Time zone: UTC+5
- Postcode: 141109

Syntas (Kazakh: Сынтас; Russian: Сынтас), until 2011 known as Severnoye, is a settlement in Sharbakty District, Pavlodar Region, Kazakhstan. It is part of Sharbakty Rural District (KATO code — 556855100). Population: 357 (2009 census results); 776 (1999 census results).

== Geography ==
Syntas is located in the Kulunda Steppe 5 kilometers (3.1 mi) to the west of Bura lake and 6 kilometers (3.7 mi) from the Kazakhstan–Russia border. Sharbakty town, the district capital, lies 22 kilometers (14 mi) to the southwest.
