= Novokulundinka =

Novokulundinka Новокулундинка
- Settlement
- Location within Altai Krai Location within Russia
- Coordinates: 53°02′N 80°10′E
- Country: Russia
- Region: Altai Krai
- District: Blagoveshchensky District
- Time zone: UTC+7:00

Novokulundinka (Russian: Новокулундинка) is a rural locality (a settlement) and the administrative center of Novokulundinsky Selsoviet, Blagoveshchensky District, Altai Krai, Russia. The population was 490 as of 2013. It was founded in 1923. There are 3 streets.

== Geography ==
Novokulundinka is located 42 km northeast of Blagoveshchenka (the district's administrative centre) by road. Dolinka is the nearest rural locality.
