= Mirabilit =

Mirabilit Мирабилит
- Settlement
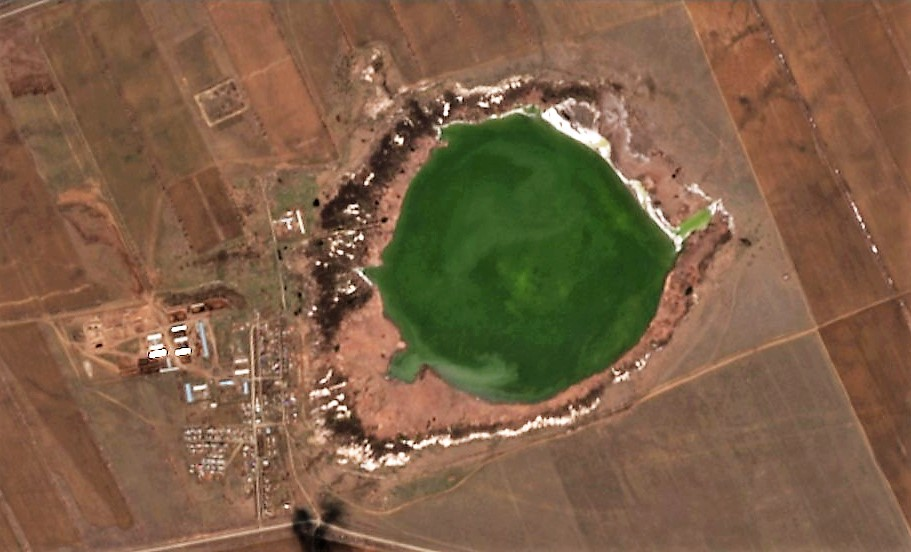
- Maloye Shklo and Mirabilit Sentinel-2 image

- Location within Altai Krai Location within Russia
- Coordinates: 52°33′N 79°01′E
- Country: Russia
- Region: Altai Krai
- District: Kulundinsky District
- Time zone: UTC+7:00

Mirabilit (Russian: Мирабилит) is a rural locality (a settlement) and the administrative center of Mirabilitsky Selsoviet, Kulundinsky District, Altai Krai, Russia. The population was 412 as of 2013. There are 4 streets.

== Geography ==
Mirabilit lies in the Kulunda Steppe, near lake Maloye Shklo, and 5 kilometers (3.1 mi) to the SSW of lake Bolshoye Shklo. It is located 8 km east of Kulunda (the district's administrative centre) by road. Kulunda is the nearest rural locality.
