= Popasnoye =

Popasnoye Попасное
- Selo
- Location within Altai Krai Location within Russia
- Coordinates: 52°28′N 78°43′E
- Country: Russia
- Region: Altai Krai
- District: Kulundinsky District
- Time zone: UTC+7:00

Popasnoye (Russian: Попасное) is a rural locality (a selo) in Kursky Selsoviet, Kulundinsky District, Altai Krai, Russia. The population was 152 as of 2013. There is 1 street.

== Geography ==
Popasnoye is located 24 km southwest of Kulunda (the district's administrative centre) by road. Novopokrovka is the nearest rural locality.
