= Glyaden-4 =

Glyaden-4 Глядень-4
- Selo
- Location within Altai Krai Location within Russia
- Coordinates: 52°45′N 80°12′E
- Country: Russia
- Region: Altai Krai
- District: Blagoveshchensky District
- Time zone: UTC+7:00

Glyaden-4 (Russian: Глядень-4) is a rural locality (a selo) in Blagoveshchensky District, Altai Krai, Russia. The population was 149 as of 2013. There is 1 street.

== Geography ==
Glyaden-4 is located 43 km southeast of Blagoveshchenka (the district's administrative centre) by road. Glyaden is the nearest rural locality.
