= Estlan =

Estlan Эстлань
- Settlement
- Location within Altai Krai Location within Russia
- Coordinates: 52°31′N 78°50′E
- Country: Russia
- Region: Altai Krai
- District: Kulundinsky District
- Time zone: UTC+7:00

Estlan (Russian: Эстлань) is a rural locality (a settlement) in Oktyabrsky Selsoviet, Kulundinsky District, Altai Krai, Russia. The population was 43 as of 2013. There is 1 street.

== Geography ==
Estlan lies in the Kulunda Steppe, near lake Shchekulduk to the east. It is located 14 km southwest of Kulunda (the district's administrative centre) by road. Novopetrovka is the nearest rural locality.
