= Gorkiye Kilty =

Salt lake in Altai Krai, Russia

- Горькие Кильты
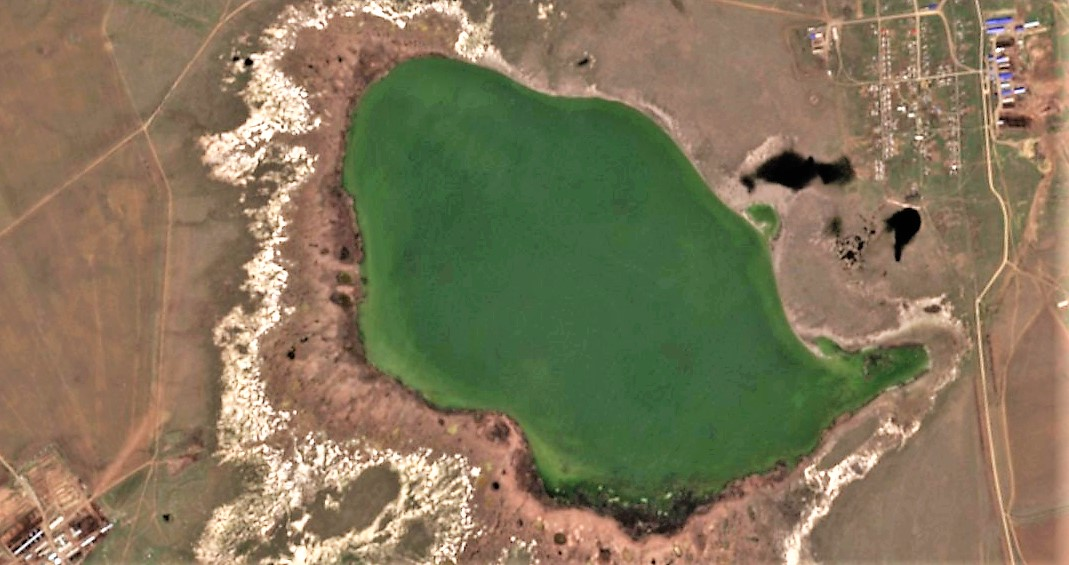
- Sentinel-2 image of the lake

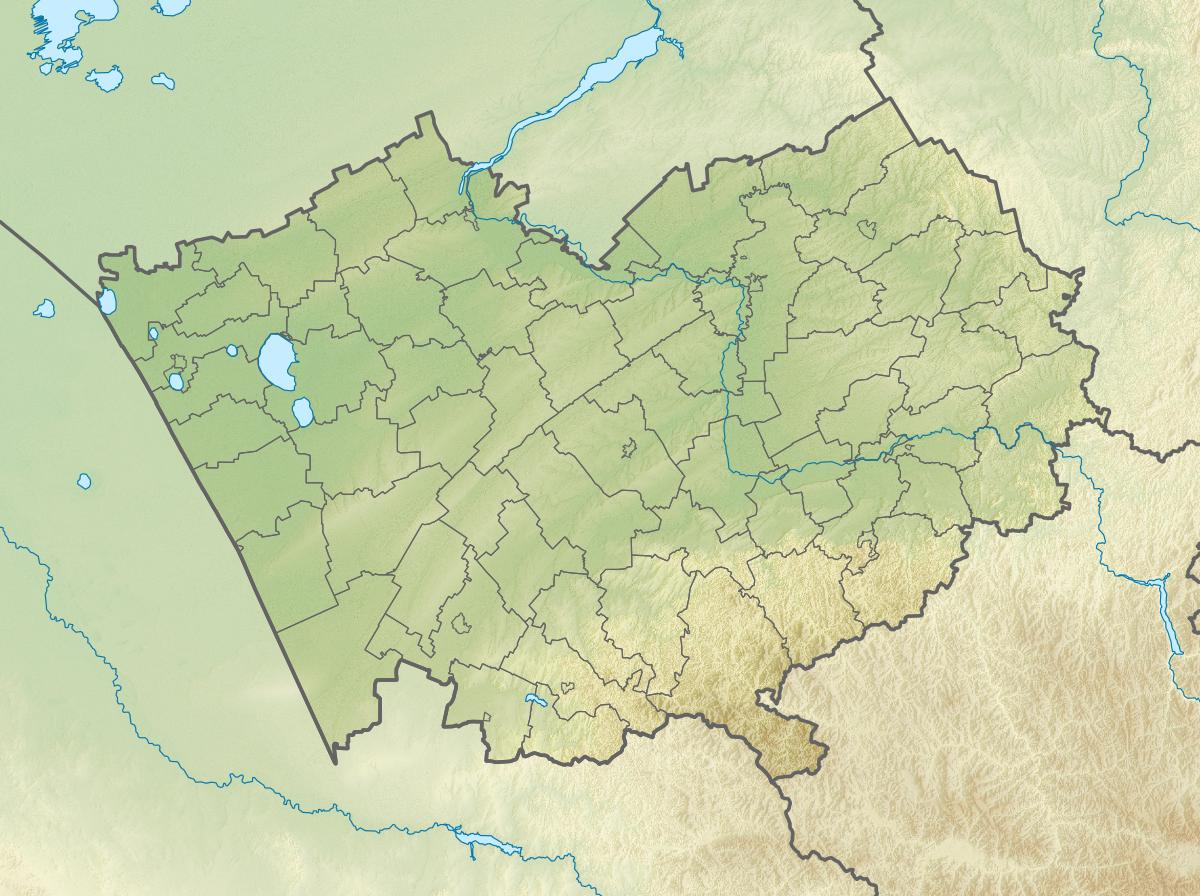
- Location within Altai Krai Location within Russia
- Location: Kulunda Steppe; West Siberian Plain
- Coordinates: 52°32′47″N 79°17′26″E
- Type: endorheic
- Catchment area: 305 square kilometers (118 sq mi)
- Basin countries: Russia
- Max. length: 3.5 kilometers (2.2 mi)
- Max. width: 2.2 kilometers (1.4 mi)
- Surface area: 4.8 square kilometers (1.9 sq mi)
- Residence time: UTC+7
- Surface elevation: 116 meters (381 ft)
- Islands: none
- Settlements: Semyonovka, Smirnenkoye and Ozyornoye

Gorkiye Kilty (Russian: Горькие Кильты), also known as Gorkiye Kelty (Russian: Горькие Келыты) and as Kelty Gorkoye (Russian: Келыты Горькое), is a salt lake in Kulundinsky District, Altai Krai, Russian Federation.

The lake is located close to the western edge of the Krai. The nearest inhabited places are Semyonovka located 0.8 kilometers (0.50 mi) from the eastern lakeshore, Smirnenkoye 1.6 kilometers (0.99 mi) from the southwestern side, and Ozyornoye, 3.3 kilometers (2.1 mi) from the southern end. Kulunda, the district capital, lies 20 kilometers (12 mi) to the west.

== Geography ==
Located in the Kulunda Plain, Gorkiye Kelty has a roughly semicircular shape. It stretches approximately from northwest to southeast. The shores are bound by salt pans in some tracts.

Lake Shchekulduk lies 24 kilometers (15 mi) to the west, Bolshoye Shklo-Ushkaly 17 kilometers (11 mi) to the northwest, Krivaya Puchina 8 kilometers (5.0 mi) to the south, lake Dzhira 12 kilometers (7.5 mi) to the northeast, and Kuchuk 30 kilometers (19 mi) to the ENE. The Russia-Kazakhstan border lies 39 kilometers (24 mi) to the WSW.

== Flora and fauna ==
The lake is surrounded by flat steppe landscape and cultivated fields. Among the birds found by the lake in the summer, the long-legged buzzard and the pied avocet deserve mention.

== See also ==
- List of lakes of Russia
