= Semyonovka, Kulundinsky District, Altai Krai =

Semyonovka Семёновка
- Village
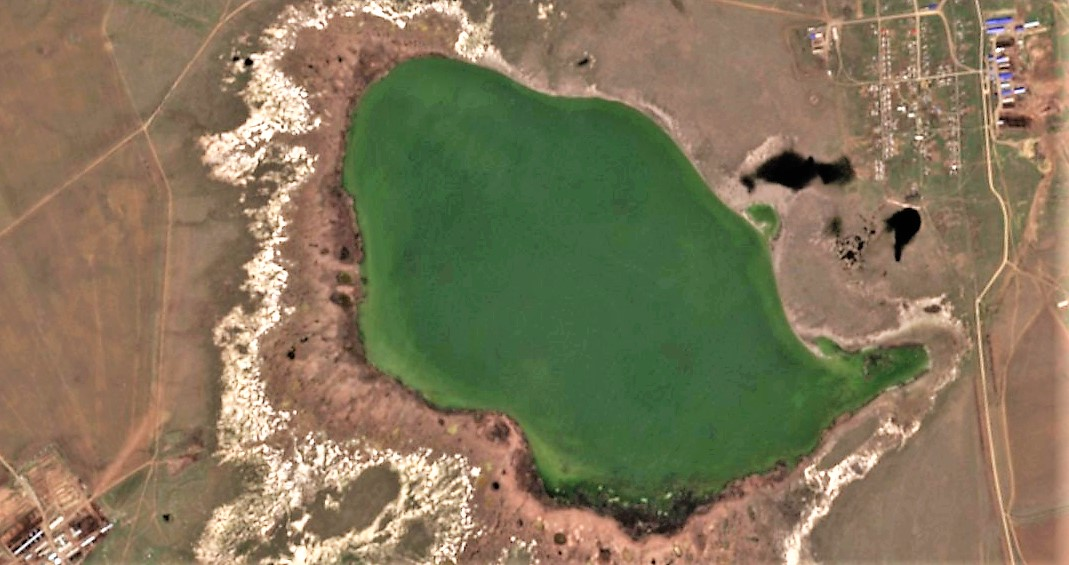
- Sentinel-2 image of lake Gorkiye Kilty with Semyonovka in the upper right.

- Location within Altai Krai Location within Russia
- Coordinates: 52°33′N 79°19′E
- Country: Russian Federation
- Federal Subject: Altai Krai
- District: Kulundinsky District
- Village Council: Semyonovsky Village Council
- Time zone: UTC+7:00
- Postal Code: 658909

Semyonovka (Russian: Семёновка) is a rural locality (a selo) and the administrative center of Semyonovsky Village Council, Kulundinsky District, Altai Krai, Russia. The village was established in 1909. The population was 404 as of 2013. There are 4 streets.

== Geography ==
Semyonovka lies in the Kulunda Steppe, near lake Gorkiye Kilty to the west. It is located 37 km east of Kulunda (the district's administrative centre) by road. Ozyornoye is the nearest rural locality.
