= Gorodetsky =

Gorodetsky (masculine), Gorodetskaya (feminine), or Gorodetskoye (neuter) may refer to:

- Gorodetsky (surname)
- Gorodetsky District, a district of Nizhny Novgorod Oblast, Russia
- Gorodetsky (rural locality) (Gorodetskaya, Gorodetskoye), name of several rural localities in Russia

== See also ==
- Mayak Gorodetsky, a rural locality in Ostrovnoy, Murmansk Oblast, Russia
