= Lebedino =

Lebedino Лебедино
- Selo
- Location within Altai Krai Location within Russia
- Coordinates: 52°47′N 79°17′E
- Country: Russia
- Region: Altai Krai
- District: Tabunsky District
- Time zone: UTC+7:00

Lebedino (Russian: Лебедино) is a rural locality (a selo) and the administrative center of Lebedinsky Selsoviet, Tabunsky District, Altai Krai, Russia. The population was 474 as of 2013. There are 6 streets.

== Geography ==
Lebedino lies in the Kulunda Steppe by lake Shoshkaly, 9 kilometers (5.6 mi) to the northwest of lake Bauzhansor and 7 kilometers (4.3 mi) to the WSW of lake Zhigilda. It is located 45 km east of Tabuny (the district's administrative centre) by road. Yelizavetgrad is the nearest rural locality.
