= Stepnoye Ozero =

Inhabited locality name

Stepnoye Ozero (Russian: Степно́е О́зеро) is the name of several inhabited localities in Russia.

Urban localities

- Stepnoye Ozero, Altai Krai, a work settlement under the administrative jurisdiction of Stepnoozersky Settlement Council in Blagoveshchensky District of Altai Krai

Rural localities

- Stepnoye Ozero, Republic of Tatarstan, a selo in Nurlatsky District of the Republic of Tatarstan
