= Vozdvizhenka =

Vozdvizhenka may refer to:

- Vozdvizhenka Street, a street in Moscow, Russia
- Vozdvizhenka (air base), an air base in Primorsky Krai, Russia
- Vozdvizhenka (rural locality), name of several rural localities in Russia
- Vozdvizhenka (Bakhmut Raion), a village in Svitlodarsk urban hromada, Bakhmut Raion, Donetsk Oblast, Ukraine
