= Glyaden, Altai Krai =

Glyaden Глядень
- Selo
- Location within Altai Krai Location within Russia
- Coordinates: 52°45′N 80°15′E
- Country: Russia
- Region: Altai Krai
- District: Blagoveshchensky District
- Time zone: UTC+7:00

Glyaden (Russian: Глядень) is a rural locality (a selo) and the administrative center of Glyadensky Selsoviet, Blagoveshchensky District, Altai Krai, Russia. The population was 684 as of 2013. There are 6 streets.

== Geography ==
Glyaden is located 40 km southeast of Blagoveshchenka (the district's administrative centre) by road. Glyaden-2 is the nearest rural locality. The Kulunda Main Canal passes near the village.
