= Stepnoye Ozero, Altai Krai =

Rural locality in Blagoveshchensky District, Altai Krai

Coordinates: 52°46′52″N 79°50′58″E

Stepnoye Ozero (Russian: Степно́е О́зеро) is an urban locality (an urban-type settlement) in Blagoveshchensky District of Altai Krai, Russia. Population: 6,672 (2010 census); 7,184 (2002 census); 7,447 (1989 Soviet census).
