= Myshkino =

Myshkino Мышкино
- Selo
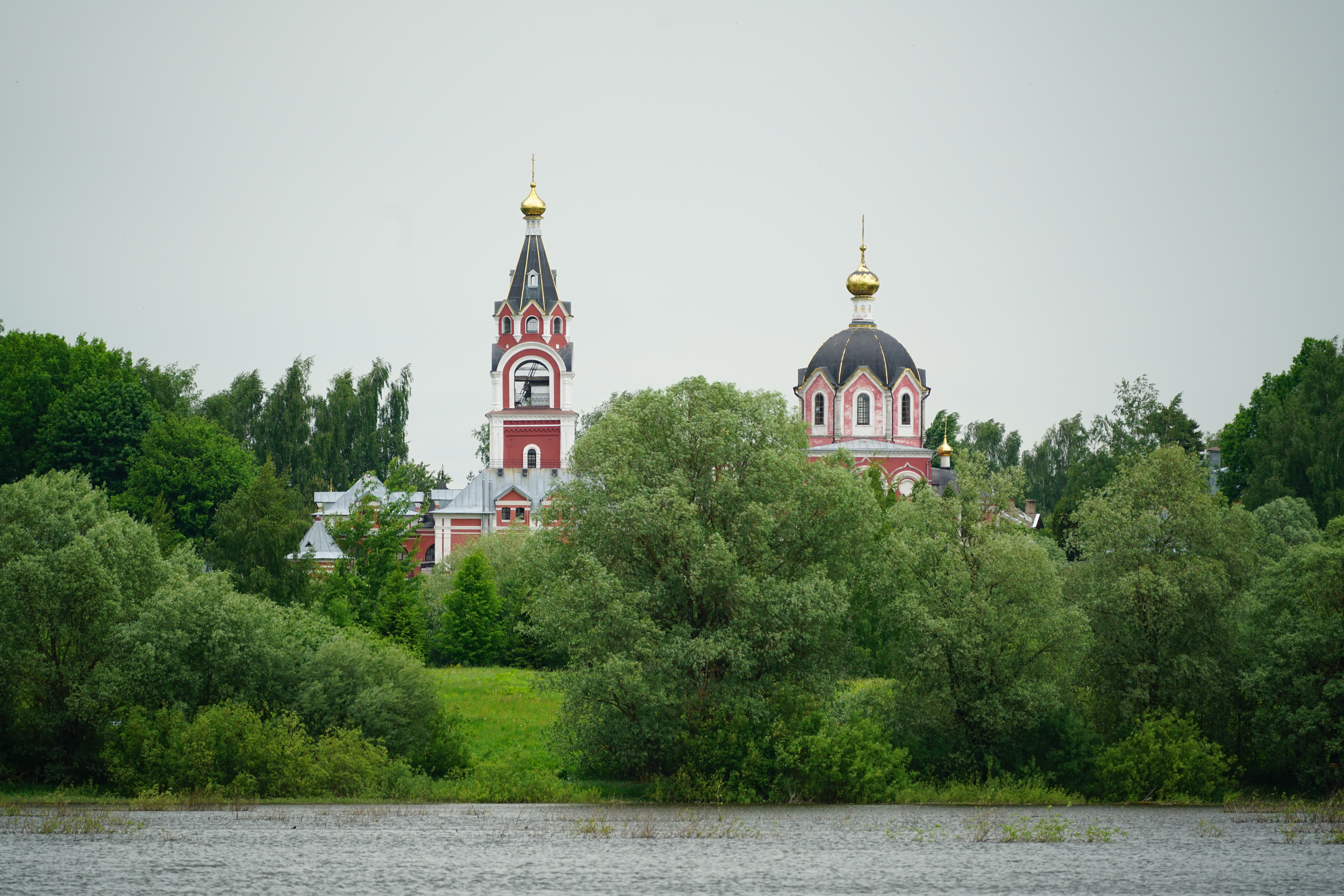

- Location within Altai Krai Location within Russia
- Coordinates: 52°35′N 78°57′E
- Country: Russia
- Region: Altai Krai
- District: Kulundinsky District
- Time zone: UTC+7:00

Myshkino (Russian: Мышкино) is a rural locality (a selo) in Konstantinovsky Selsoviet, Kulundinsky District, Altai Krai, Russia. The population was 374 as of 2013. There are 2 streets.

== Geography ==
Myshkino lies in the Kulunda Steppe, near lake Bolshoye Shklo to the northeast. It is located 7 km northeast of Kulunda (the district's administrative centre) by road. Kulunda is the nearest rural locality.
