= Yelizavetgrad, Altai Krai =

Yelizavetgrad Елизаветград
- Selo
- Location within Altai Krai Location within Russia
- Coordinates: 52°47′N 79°21′E
- Country: Russia
- Region: Altai Krai
- District: Tabunsky District
- Time zone: UTC+7:00

Yelizavetgrad (Russian: Елизаветград) is a rural locality (a selo) in Lebedinsky Selsoviet, Tabunsky District, Altai Krai, Russia. The population was 150 as of 2013. There are 3 streets.

== Geography ==
Yelizavetgrad lies in the Kulunda Steppe close to lake Shoshkaly, 3 kilometers (1.9 mi) to the southwest of lake Zhigilda, and 5 kilometers (3.1 mi) to the northwest of lake Bauzhansor. It is located 53 km east of Tabuny (the district's administrative centre) by road. Lebedino is the nearest rural locality.
