= Bolshoye Shklo =

Salt lake in Altai Krai, Russia

- Большое Шкло
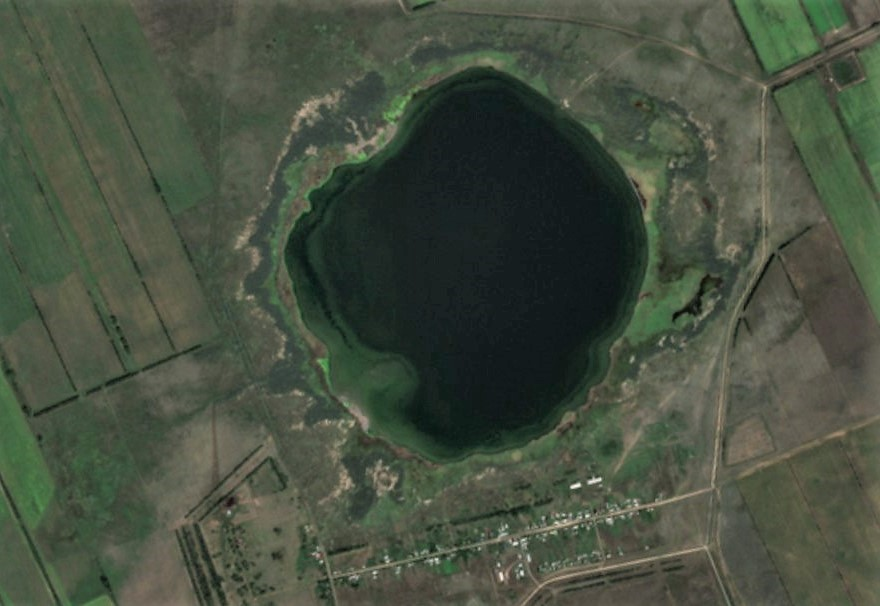
- Sentinel-2 image of the lake with Konstantinovka village below

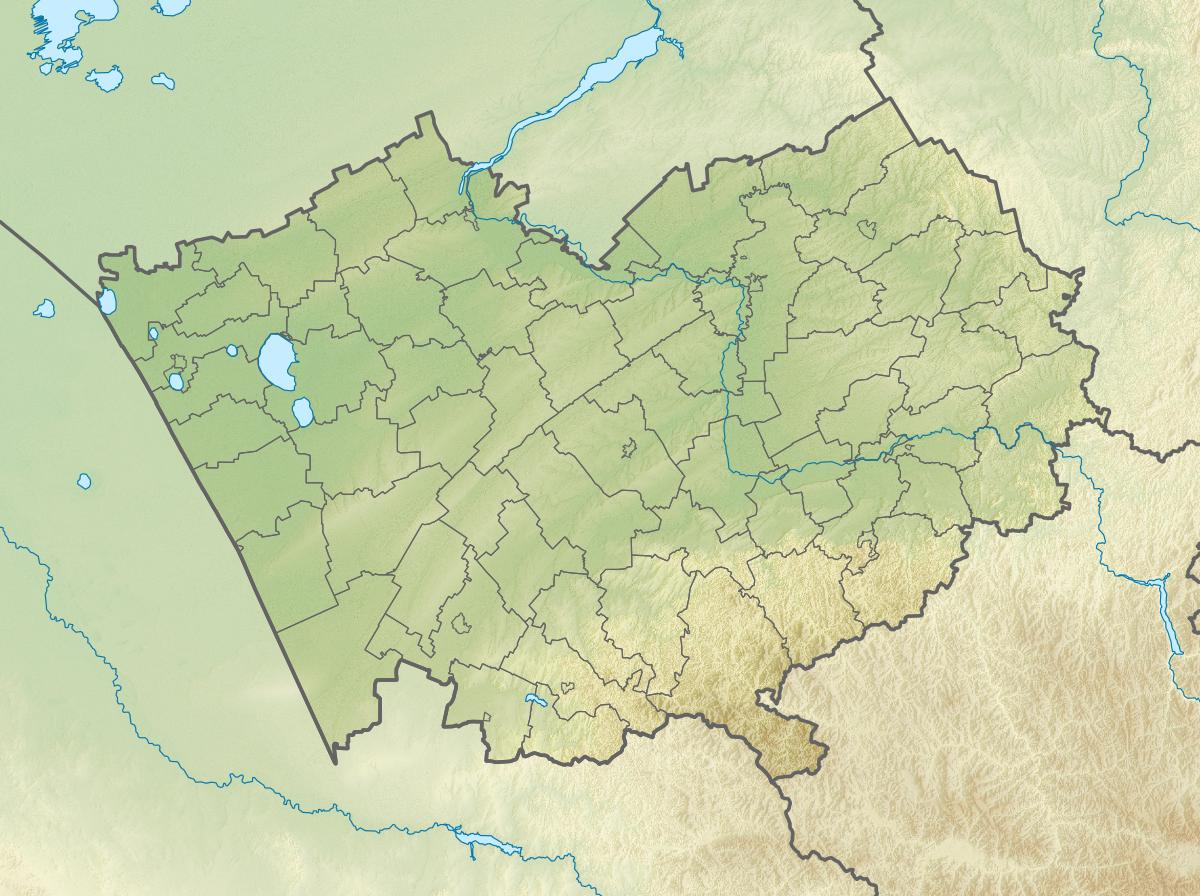
- Location within Altai Krai Location within Russia
- Location: Kulunda Steppe; West Siberian Plain
- Coordinates: 52°37′51″N 79°04′21″E
- Type: endorheic
- Basin countries: Russia
- Max. length: 2.2 kilometers (1.4 mi)
- Max. width: 1.9 kilometers (1.2 mi)
- Surface area: 3.3 square kilometers (1.3 sq mi)
- Residence time: UTC+7
- Surface elevation: 116 meters (381 ft)
- Settlements: Konstantinovka

Bolshoye Shklo (Russian: Большое Шкло), also known as Bolshoye Shklo-Ushkaly (Russian: Большое Шкло-Ушкалы), is a salt lake in Kulundinsky District, Altai Krai, Russian Federation.

The lake lies at the western end of the Krai. Konstantinovka is located by the southern lakeshore and Kulunda, the district capital, lies 9.5 kilometers (5.9 mi) to the southwest of the lake. Other inhabited places nearby are Zlatopol, 11 kilometers (6.8 mi) to the east, Mirabilit, 6.5 kilometers (4.0 mi) to the south, Myshkino, 8 kilometers (5.0 mi) to the southwest, and Smirnenkoye 14 kilometers (8.7 mi) to the southeast.

== Geography ==
Bolshoye Shklo is located in a residual depression of the Kulunda Plain. It has a roughly round shape, with a diameter of about 2 kilometers (1.2 mi).

Lake Maloye Shklo lies 4.5 kilometers (2.8 mi) to the SSW, Shchekulduk 15 kilometers (9.3 mi) to the southwest, Gorkiye Kilty 14 kilometers (8.7 mi) to the southeast, and Bolshoye Yarovoye 34 kilometers (21 mi) to the northwest, close to the Russia-Kazakhstan border.

== Flora and fauna ==
The lake is surrounded by flat steppe landscape, cultivated fields, and a village. Artemia salina crustaceans live in the lake and are harvested for commercial purposes.

== See also ==
- List of lakes of Russia
