= Shchekulduk =

Salt lake in Altai Krai, Russia

- Щекулдук
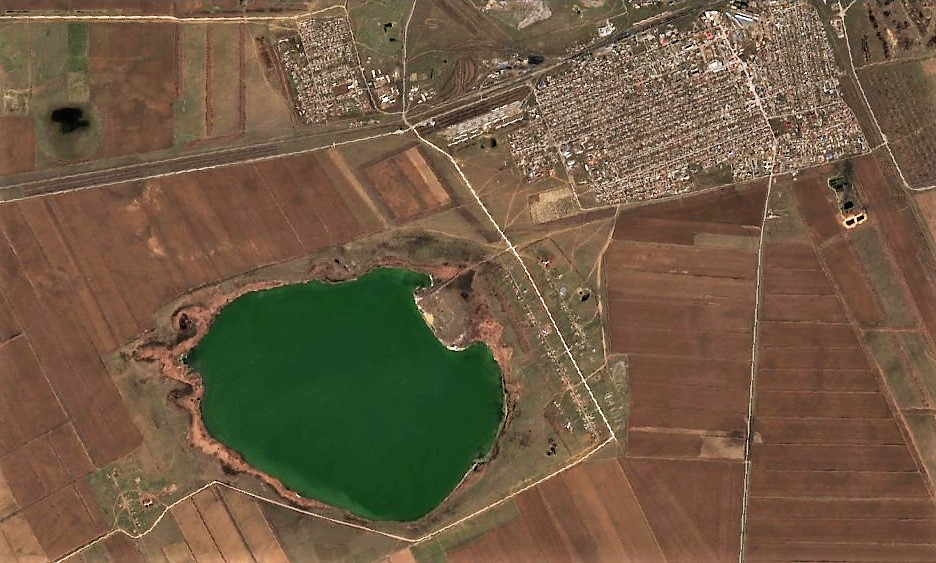
- Sentinel-2 image of the lake with Kulunda town in the upper right

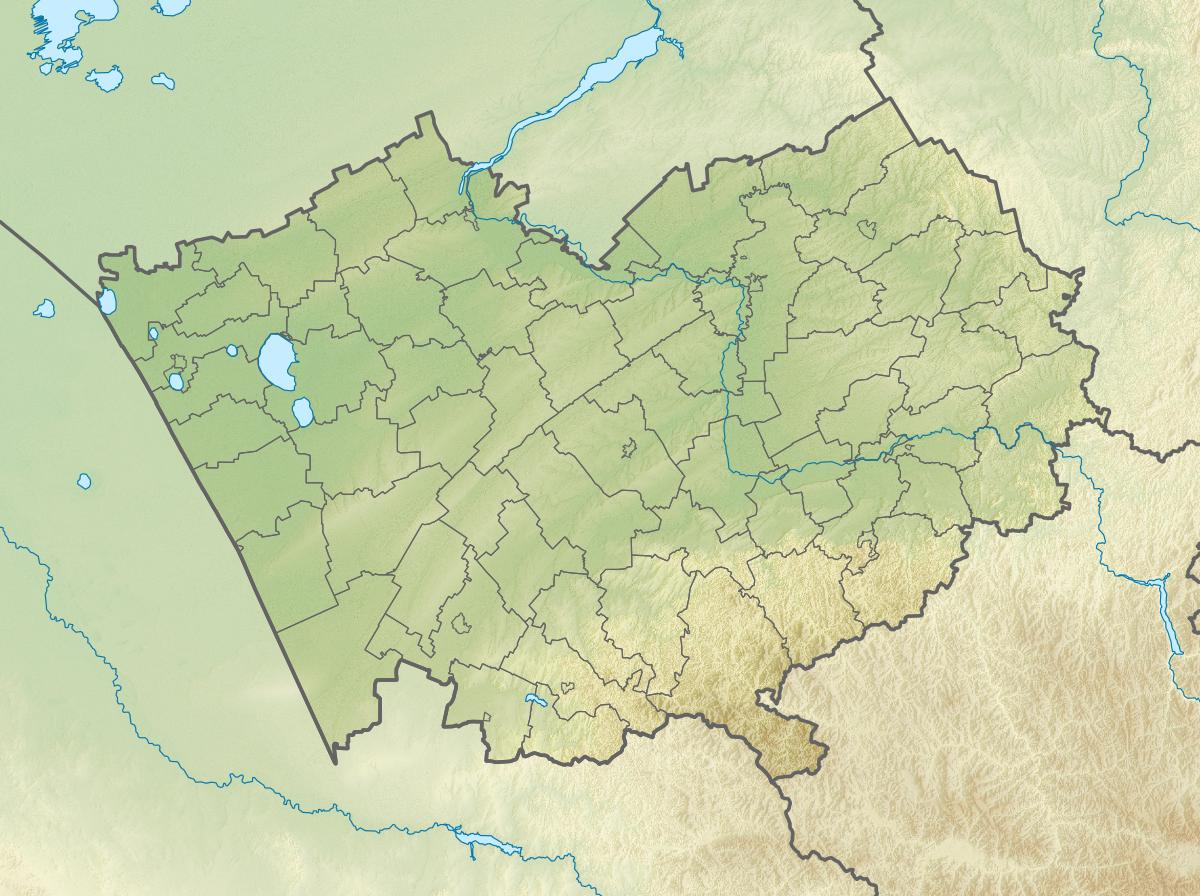
- Location within Altai Krai Location within Russia
- Location: Kulunda Steppe; West Siberian Plain
- Coordinates: 52°32′04″N 78°52′39″E
- Type: endorheic
- Basin countries: Russia
- Max. length: 3.8 kilometers (2.4 mi)
- Max. width: 2.9 kilometers (1.8 mi)
- Surface area: 7.1 square kilometers (2.7 sq mi)
- Residence time: UTC+7
- Surface elevation: 123 meters (404 ft)
- Settlements: Kulunda

Shchekulduk (Russian: Щекулдук), also known as Shekulduk (Russian: Шекулдук) is a salt lake in Kulundinsky District, Altai Krai, Russian Federation.

The lake is located in the western part of the Krai. Kulunda, the district capital, lies just 1.5 kilometers (0.93 mi) from the northeastern shore of the lake. Other inhabited places nearby are Estlan, 0.8 kilometers (0.50 mi) to the southwest, Novopetrovka, 0.6 kilometers (0.37 mi) to the east, and Oktyabrsky 1.7 kilometers (1.1 mi) to the north.

The name of the lake is of Kazakh origin.

== Geography ==
Shchekulduk is located in a residual depression of the Kulunda Plain. It has a roughly polygonal shape, with a length of almost 4 kilometers (2.5 mi) from west to east. The lakeshore has a small peninsula on the northeastern side that forms a small bay named Bukhta Udachi where there is tourism infrastructure for visitors.

Lake Kirey lies 8 kilometers (5.0 mi) to the ESE, Bolshoye Shklo 15 kilometers (9.3 mi) to the northeast, Gorkiye Kilty 24 kilometers (15 mi) to the east, and Bura 26 kilometers (16 mi) to the northwest, at the Russia-Kazakhstan border.

== Flora and fauna ==
The lake is surrounded by flat steppe landscape, cultivated fields and urbanized areas.

== See also ==
- List of lakes of Russia
