= Vozdvizhenka, Alsheyevsky District, Republic of Bashkortostan =

Vozdvizhenka Воздвиженка
- Selo
- Location within Bashkortostan Location within Russia
- Coordinates: 53°52′N 54°30′E
- Country: Russia
- Region: Bashkortostan
- District: Alsheyevsky District
- Time zone: UTC+5:00

Vozdvizhenka (Russian: Воздвиженка) is a rural locality (a selo) and the administrative center of Vozdvizhensky Selsoviet, Alsheyevsky District, Bashkortostan, Russia. The population was 362 as of 2010. There are 5 streets.

== Geography ==
Vozdvizhenka is located 41 km southwest of Rayevsky (the district's administrative centre) by road. Chelnokovka is the nearest rural locality.
