= Vozdvizhenka, Tuymazinsky District, Republic of Bashkortostan =

Vozdvizhenka Воздвиженка
- Village
- Location within Bashkortostan Location within Russia
- Coordinates: 54°32′N 53°51′E
- Country: Russia
- Region: Bashkortostan
- District: Tuymazinsky District
- Time zone: UTC+5:00

Vozdvizhenka (Russian: Воздвиженка) is a rural locality (a village) in Gafurovsky Selsoviet, Tuymazinsky District, Bashkortostan, Russia. The population was 232 as of 2010. There are 4 streets.

== Geography ==
Vozdvizhenka is located 15 km southeast of Tuymazy (the district's administrative centre) by road. Kyzyl-Tash is the nearest rural locality.
