= Gorodetskoye, Republic of Bashkortostan =

Gorodetskoye Городецкое
- Selo
- Location within Bashkortostan Location within Russia
- Coordinates: 53°54′N 53°48′E
- Country: Russia
- Region: Bashkortostan
- District: Yermekeyevsky District
- Time zone: UTC+5:00

Gorodetskoye (Russian: Городецкое) is a rural locality (a selo) in Beketovsky Selsoviet, Yermekeyevsky District, Bashkortostan, Russia. The population was 153 as of 2010. There is 1 street.

== Geography ==
Gorodetskoye is located 30 km southeast of Yermekeyevo (the district's administrative centre) by road. Imeni 8 Marta is the nearest rural locality.
