= Vozdvizhenka, Khaybullinsky District, Republic of Bashkortostan =

Vozdvizhenka Воздвиженка
- Village
- Location within Bashkortostan Location within Russia
- Coordinates: 52°07′N 58°21′E
- Country: Russia
- Region: Bashkortostan
- District: Khaybullinsky District
- Time zone: UTC+5:00

Vozdvizhenka (Russian: Воздвиженка) is a rural locality (a village) in Makansky Selsoviet, Khaybullinsky District, Bashkortostan, Russia. The population was 302 as of 2010. There are 3 streets.

== Geography ==
Vozdvizhenka is located 37 km north of Akyar (the district's administrative centre) by road. Podolsk is the nearest rural locality.
