= Sharbakty District =

Coordinates: 52°30′00″N 78°09′36″E

Sharbakty Шарбақты
- District
- Şarbaqty audany
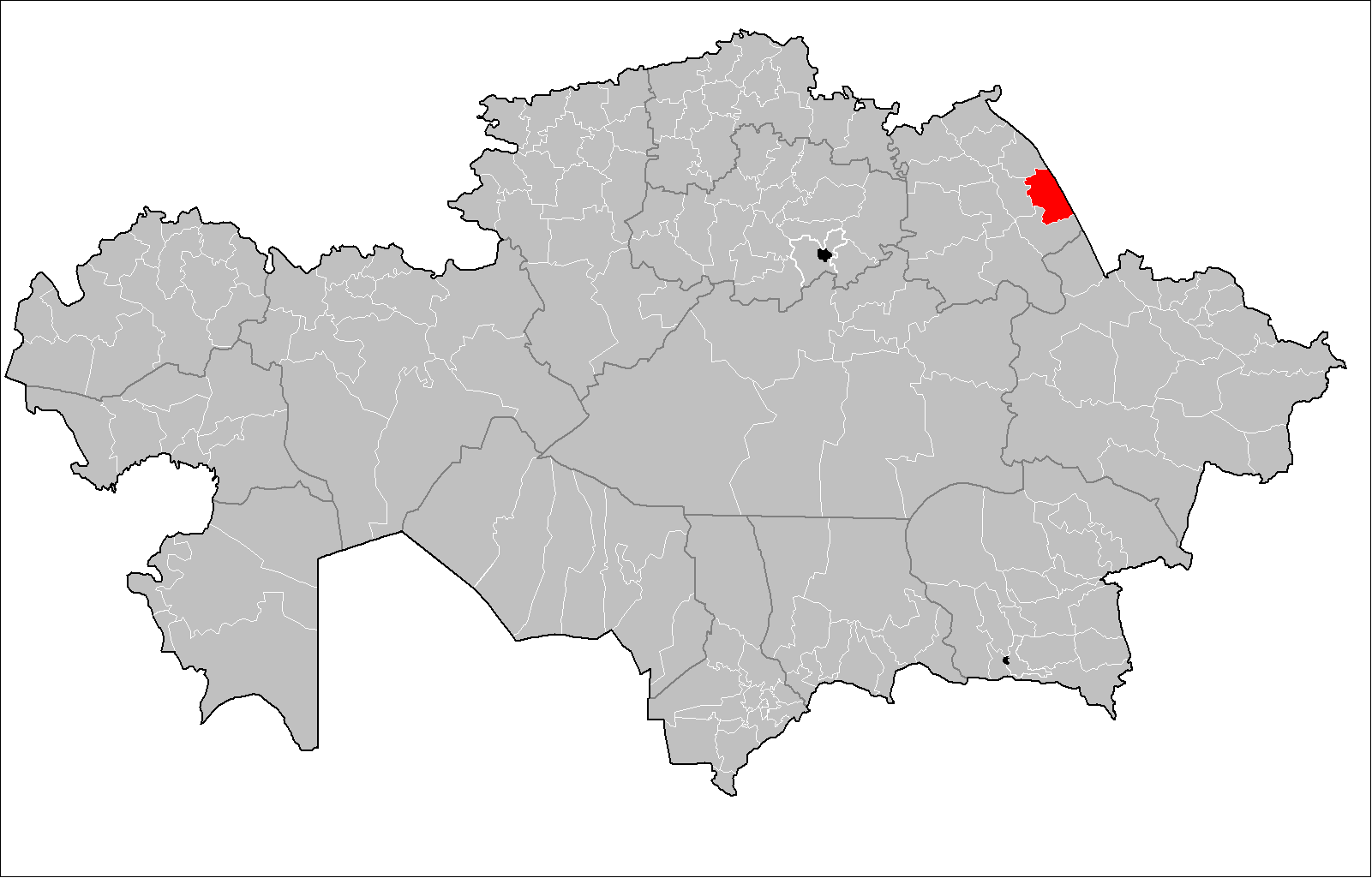
- Country: Kazakhstan
- Region: Pavlodar Region
- Administrative center: Sharbakty
- Founded: 1928

Government
  - Akim: Abeuov Azilkhan Karigulovich

Area
  - Total: 2,700 sq mi (6,900 km^{2})

Population (2013)
  - Total: 20,975
- Time zone: UTC+6 (East)

Sharbakty (Kazakh: Шарбақты ауданы, Şarbaqty audany) is a district of Pavlodar Region in northern Kazakhstan. The administrative center of the district is Sharbakty. Population: 20,975 (2013 estimate); 21,866 (2009 census results); 28,967 (1999 census results).

== Geography ==
Lakes Seiten, Bura and the eastern part of lake Maraldy are located in the district.
