= Bauzhansor =

Salt lake in Altai Krai, Russia

- Баужансор
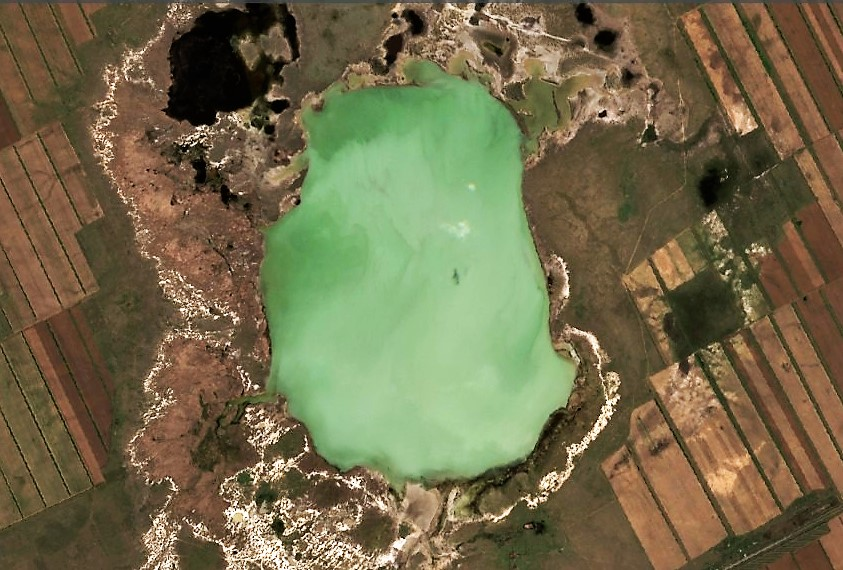
- Sentinel-2 image of the lake

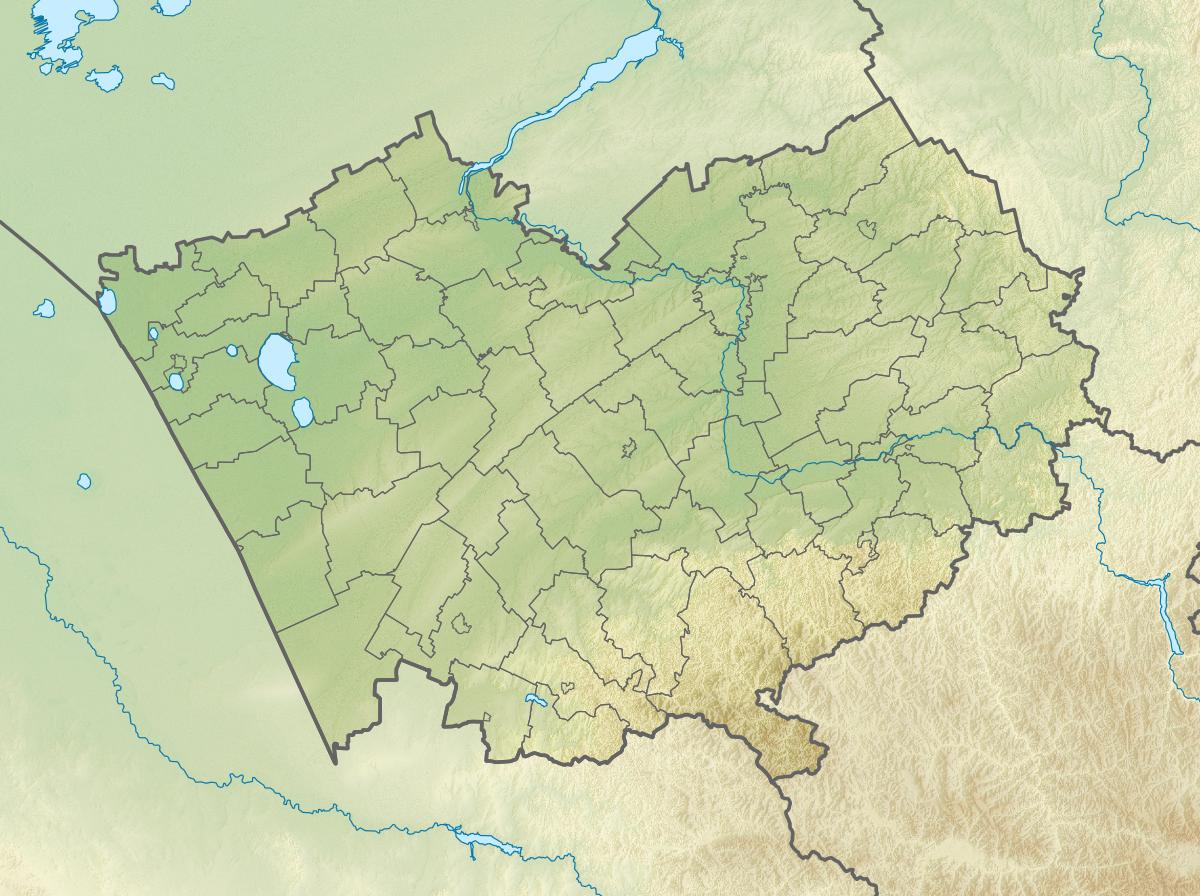
- Location within Altai Krai Location within Russia
- Location: Kulunda Steppe; West Siberian Plain
- Coordinates: 52°44′47″N 79°27′41″E
- Type: endorheic
- Basin countries: Russia
- Max. length: 5.1 kilometers (3.2 mi)
- Max. width: 3.2 kilometers (2.0 mi)
- Surface area: 12.3 square kilometers (4.7 sq mi)
- Residence time: UTC+7
- Surface elevation: 98 meters (322 ft)
- Settlements: Yagotinskaya, Telmansky and Yelizavetgrad

Bauzhansor (Russian: Баужансор) or Baudzhansor (Russian: Бауджансор) is a salt lake in Blagoveshchensky District, Altai Krai, Russian Federation.

The lake is located in the western part of the Krai. The nearest inhabited places are Yagotinskaya, Telmansky and Yelizavetgrad. Blagoveshchenka, the district capital, lies 25 kilometers (16 mi) to the ENE. The border with Tabunsky District runs along the western lakeshore.

== Geography ==
Located in the Kulunda Plain, Bauzhansor is kidney-shaped. It stretches for approximately 6 kilometers (3.7 mi) from north to south. The shores are fringed by salt pans. The mud of the lake is used locally for medicinal purposes.

Lake Kuchuk lies 12 kilometers (7.5 mi) to the east, Kulunda 9 kilometers (5.6 mi) to the northeast, Zhigilda 3 kilometers (1.9 mi) to the NNW, and Dzhira 7 kilometers (4.3 mi) to the south.

== Flora and fauna ==
The lake is surrounded by flat steppe landscape and cultivated fields. The small crustaceans Artemia salina live in the lake and are periodically harvested for commercial purposes.

== See also ==
- List of lakes of Russia
