= Sharbakty (Sharbakty District) =

Sharbakty Шарбақты
- Village
- Location in East Kazakhstan Province, Kazakhstan
- Coordinates: 52.48°N 78.15°E
- Country: Kazakhstan
- Region: Pavlodar Region
- District: Sharbakty District

Population (2009)
  - Total: 7,915
- Time zone: UTC+6 (Astana Time)

Sharbakty (Kazakh: Шарбақты, Şarbaqty) is a village in Pavlodar Region, Kazakhstan. It serves as the administrative center of Sharbakty District. Population: 7,915 (2009 census results); 8,945 (1999 census results).

== Climate ==
Sharbakty has a humid continental climate (Köppen: BSk) with cold winters and warm summers.

Climate data for Sharbakty (1991–2020)
Month	Jan	Feb	Mar	Apr	May	Jun	Jul	Aug	Sep	Oct	Nov	Dec	Year
Mean daily maximum °C (°F)	−12.4 (9.7)	−10.0 (14.0)	−2.0 (28.4)	12.8 (55.0)	21.1 (70.0)	26.4 (79.5)	27.6 (81.7)	25.7 (78.3)	18.7 (65.7)	10.2 (50.4)	−1.9 (28.6)	−8.9 (16.0)	8.9 (48.0)
Daily mean °C (°F)	−17.1 (1.2)	−15.2 (4.6)	−7.1 (19.2)	6.3 (43.3)	14.1 (57.4)	19.8 (67.6)	21.4 (70.5)	19.2 (66.6)	12.2 (54.0)	4.4 (39.9)	−6.2 (20.8)	−13.5 (7.7)	3.2 (37.8)
Mean daily minimum °C (°F)	−21.6 (−6.9)	−19.8 (−3.6)	−11.8 (10.8)	0.4 (32.7)	7.2 (45.0)	13.5 (56.3)	15.5 (59.9)	13.0 (55.4)	6.4 (43.5)	−0.3 (31.5)	−10.0 (14.0)	−18.1 (−0.6)	−2.1 (28.2)
Average precipitation mm (inches)	13.4 (0.53)	12.1 (0.48)	15.5 (0.61)	17.0 (0.67)	25.6 (1.01)	40.9 (1.61)	47.7 (1.88)	32.9 (1.30)	23.9 (0.94)	21.2 (0.83)	19.7 (0.78)	17.7 (0.70)	287.5 (11.32)
Average precipitation days (≥ 1.0 mm)	4.5	3.9	4.0	4.0	4.9	6.7	7.6	5.6	5.4	6.1	6.1	5.9	64.7
Source: NOAA
