= Lake Kulunda =

Lake in the country of Russia

- Кулундинское
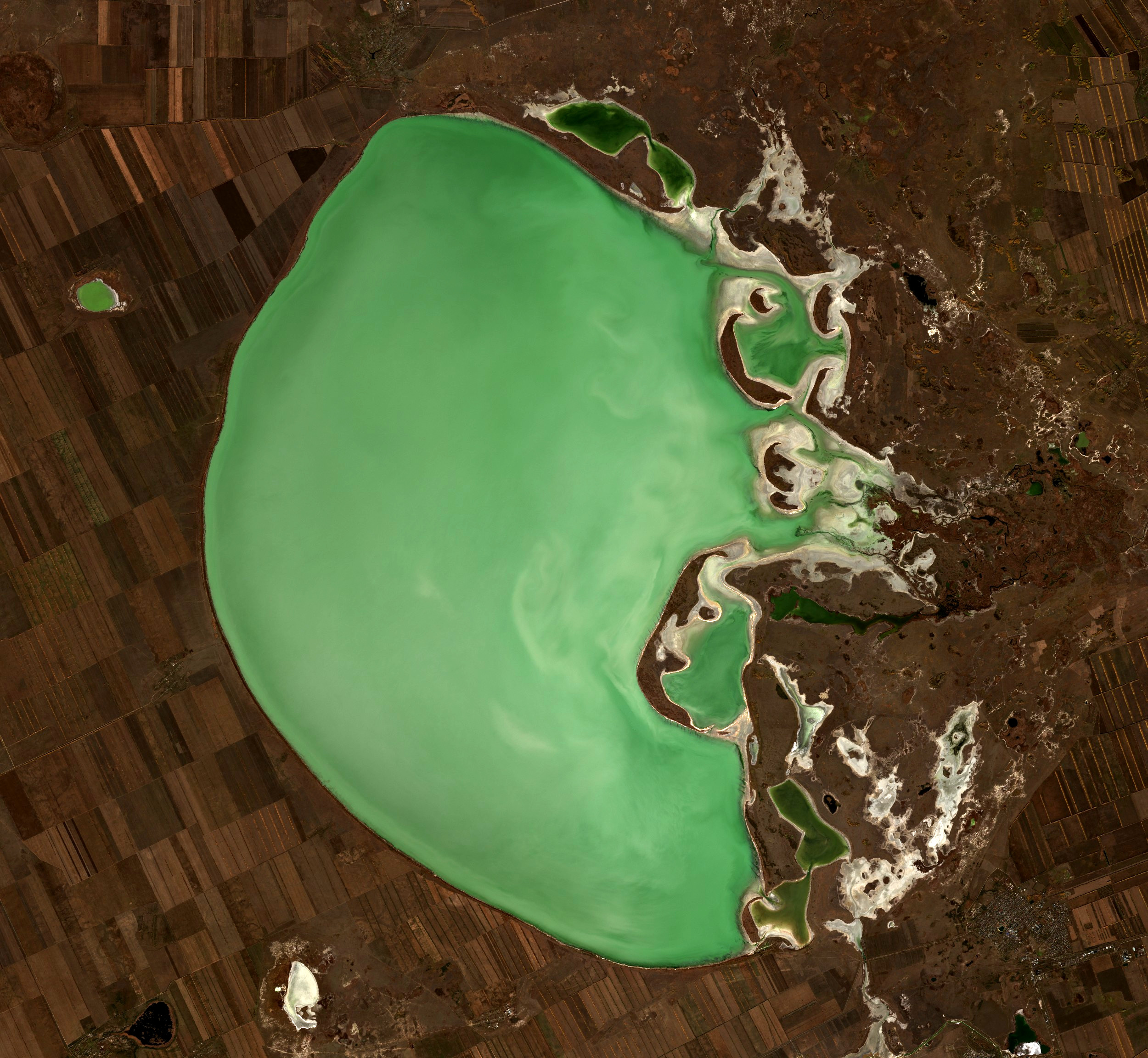
- Lake Kulunda from space (October 2021)

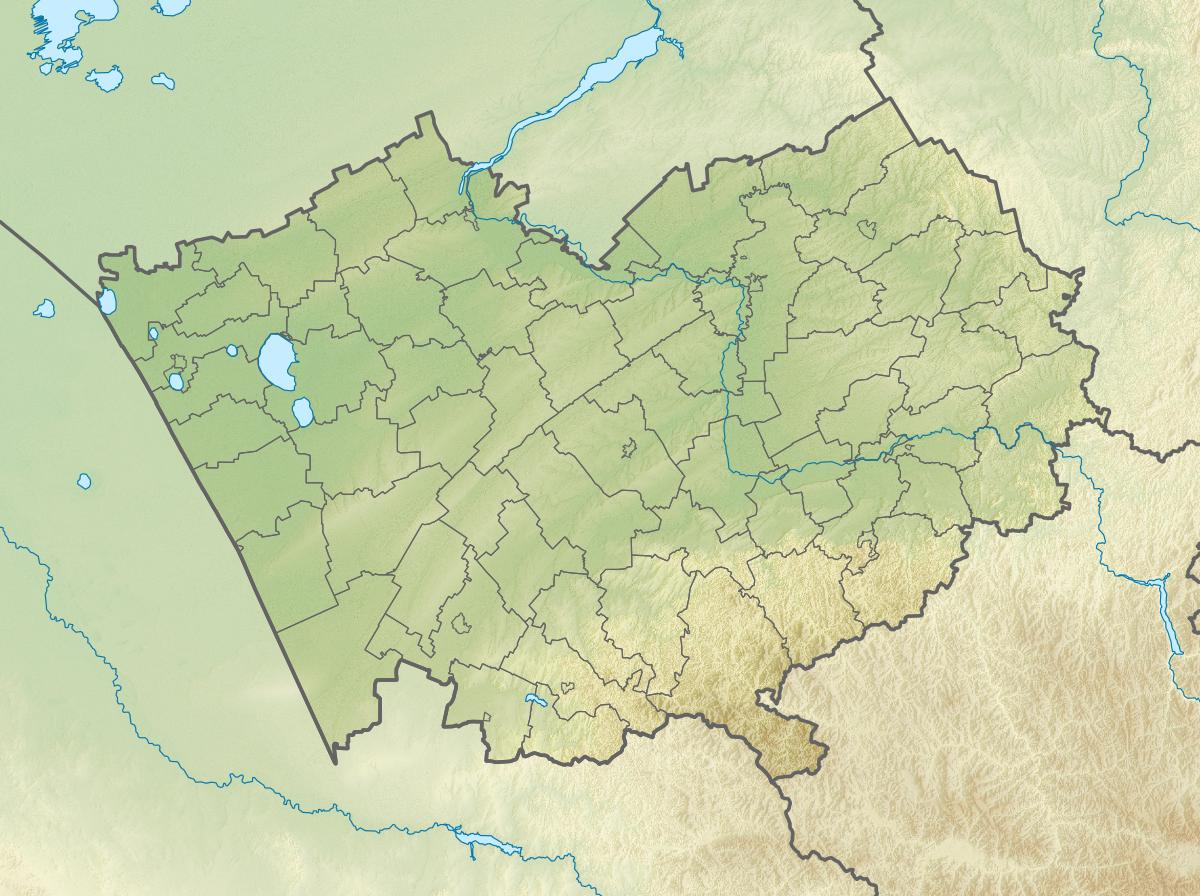
- Location within Altai Krai Location within Russia
- Location: West Siberian Plain
- Coordinates: 53°0′N 79°30′E
- Type: endorheic
- Primary inflows: Kulunda, Suetka
- Catchment area: 24,100 square kilometers (9,300 sq mi)
- Basin countries: Russia
- Max. length: 35 kilometers (22 mi)
- Max. width: 24 kilometers (15 mi)
- Surface area: 728 square kilometers (281 sq mi)
- Average depth: 2.5 meters (8 ft 2 in)
- Max. depth: 4 meters (13 ft)
- Surface elevation: 99 meters (325 ft)

Lake Kulunda or Kulundinskoye (Russian: Кулундинское озеро) is a lake in the southern part of the West Siberian Plain, Altai Krai, south-central Russia.

The Kulunda and Suetka rivers flow into the lake, which is connected by a channel with Lake Kuchuk to the south. Lake Maloye Yarovoye lies 14 kilometers (8.7 mi) to the west and lakes Bauzhansor and Zhigilda 7 kilometers (4.3 mi) to the southwest. The nearest town is Blagoveshchenka.

== Geography ==
Lake Kulunda is the largest lake in Altai Krai. It is an endorheic lake located in the eastern side of the Kulunda Plain, near the western limit of the Ob Plateau. This lake, along with many other lakes in the region, exhibits a wide array of colors. The variations in color suggest that each lake is at a different stage of eutrophication. Kuchuk, the lake immediately south of Lake Kulunda is mauve-colored, contrasting with the oval, dark blue lake along the northwest edge of the photograph. The lake has no outlets and two deltas can be observed along the eastern side of the lake. The white areas are salty minerals that were deposited on the surface as water evaporated rendering the water hypersaline, with a mineralization of 111.5 g/L, suitable for a native population of brine shrimp (Artemia sp.). A well-established shelter belt system (a series of three parallel lines adjoining end to end) runs generally north-south along the eastern side of Lake Kulunda to form a manmade barrier to help protect against wind erosion. The cultivated field patterns nearby are large and roughly rectangular in shape.

== See also ==
- list of lakes of Russia
