= Lake Kuchuk =

Lake in the country of Russia

- Кучукское
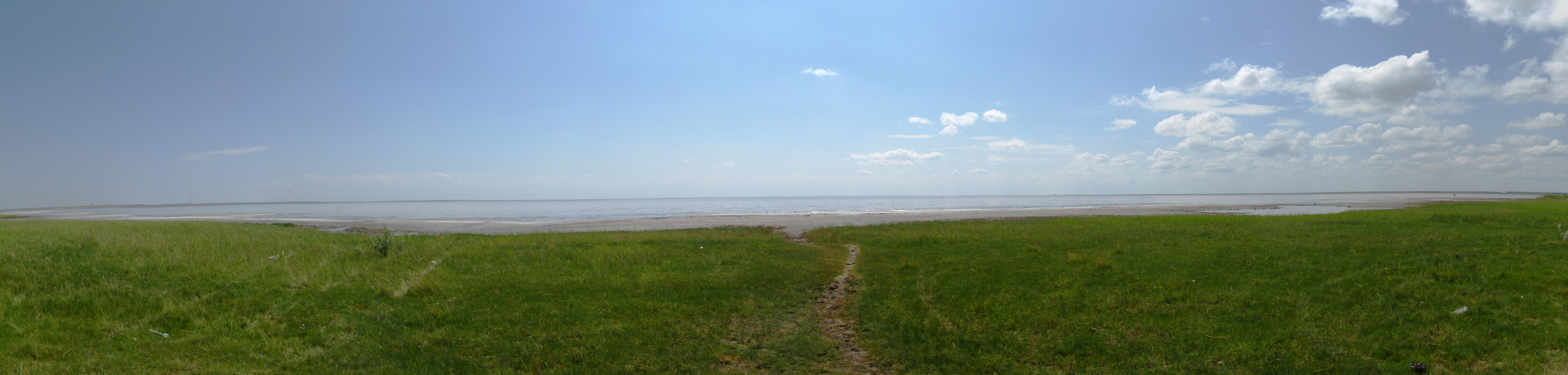
- Panorama of Lake Kuchuk

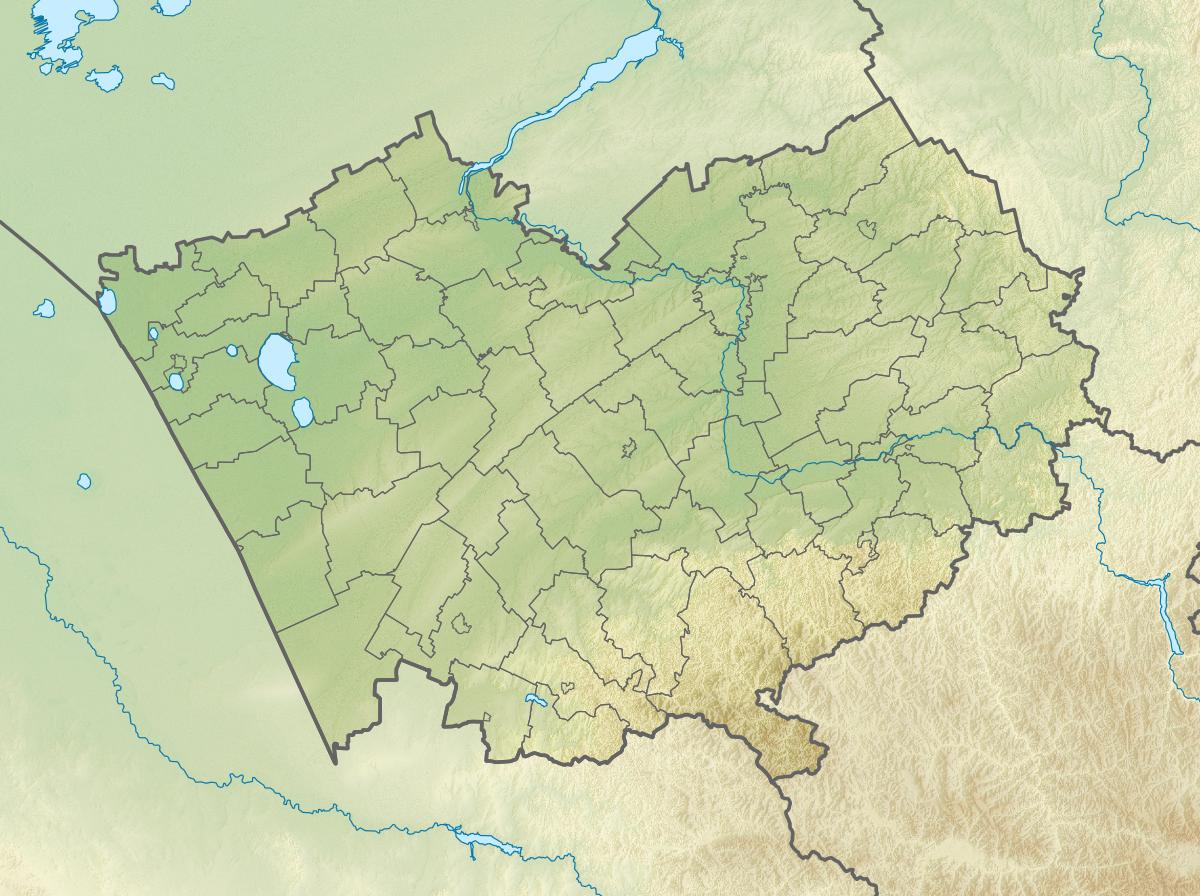
- Location within Altai Krai Location within Russia
- Location: West Siberian Plain
- Coordinates: 52°42′20″N 79°46′47″E
- Type: endorheic
- Primary inflows: Kuchuk
- Basin countries: Russia
- Max. length: 23 kilometers (14 mi)
- Max. width: 13 kilometers (8.1 mi)
- Surface area: 166 square kilometers (64 sq mi)
- Average depth: 2.3 meters (7 ft 7 in)
- Max. depth: 3.3 meters (11 ft)
- Surface elevation: 98.4 meters (323 ft)
- Islands: None

Lake Kuchuk or Kuchukskoye (Russian: Кучукское озеро) is a bittern salt lake in the southern part of the West Siberian Plain, Blagoveshchensky District, Altai Krai, south-central Russia.

Its waters are briny, containing sodium sulphate. The northern end of the lake is connected by a channel with Lake Kulunda to the north.

== Geography ==
Lake Kuchuk is the second largest lake in Altai Krai. It has an oval shape and is located 5 kilometers (3.1 mi) to the south of Lake Kulunda in the eastern side of the Kulunda Plain, near the western limit of the Ob Plateau. The Kuchuk river flows into the eastern shore of the lake. Lake Bauzhansor lies 13 kilometers (8.1 mi) to the northwest, Shukyrtuz 33 kilometers (21 mi) to the southwest, and Lake Mostovoye 72 kilometers (45 mi) to the northeast.

== See also ==
- List of lakes of Russia
