= Blagoveshchenka, Altai Krai =

Urban locality in Russia

Blagoveshchenka Благовещенка
- Urban-type settlement
- Interactive map of Blagoveshchenka
- Location of Blagoveshchenka Blagoveshchenka (Altai Krai)
- Coordinates: 52°49′55″N 79°52′24″E
- Country: Russia
- Federal subject: Altai Krai
- Administrative district: Blagoveshchensky District
- Founded: 1908
- Elevation: 109 m (358 ft)

Population (2010 Census)
  - Total: 11,626

Administrative status
  - Capital of: Blagoveshchensky District

Municipal status
  - Municipal district: Blagoveshchensky Municipal District
  - Urban settlement: Blagoveshchensky Possovet Urban Settlement
  - Capital of: Blagoveshchensky Municipal District, Blagoveshchensky Possovet Urban Settlement
- Time zone: UTC+7 (MSK+4)
- Postal code: 658670
- OKTMO ID: 01605151051

Blagoveshchenka (Russian: Благовещенка) is an urban locality (work settlement) and the administrative center of Blagoveshchensky District of Altai Krai, Russia. Population: 11,626 (2010 census); 12,416 (2002 census); 13,600 (1989 Soviet census).

== Geography ==
Blagoveshchenka is located between the Kuchuk lake to the SSW and the Kulunda lake to the northeast. Stepnoye Ozero is the nearest rural locality.
