= Blagoveshchensky District, Altai Krai =

Blagoveshchensky District Благовещенский район (Russian)
- District
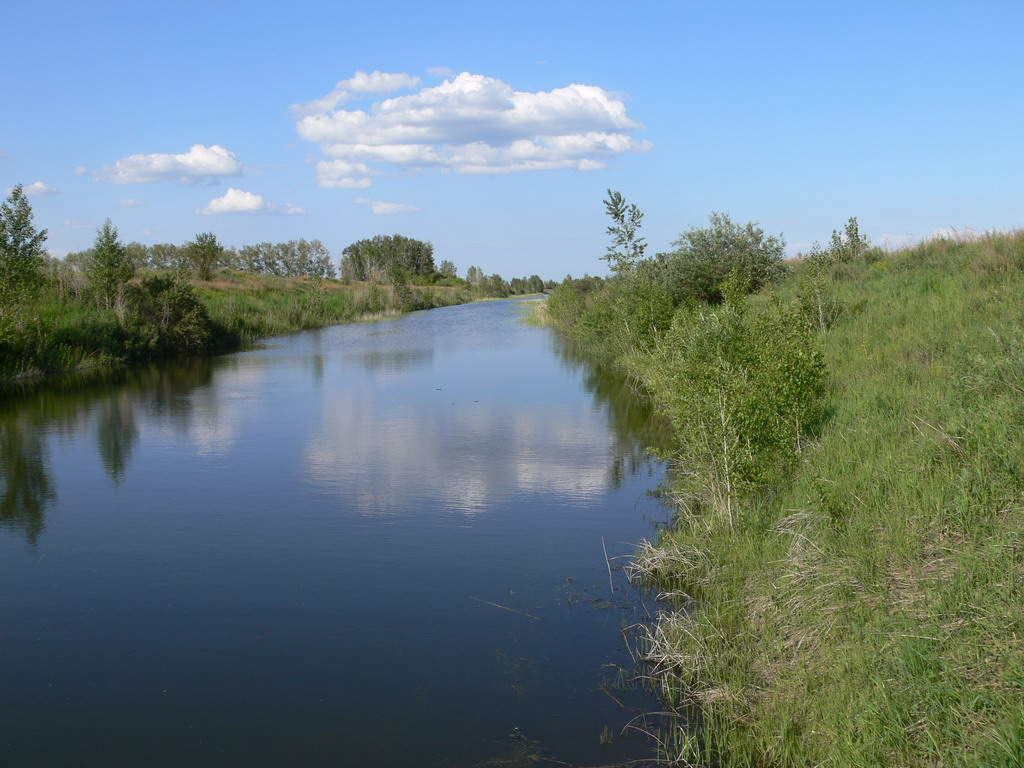
- Kulunda Main Canal near Glyaden, Blagoveshchensky District
- Location of Blagoveshchensky District in Altai Krai
- Coordinates: 52°50′N 79°52′E
- Country: Russia
- Federal subject: Altai Krai
- Established: 1925
- Administrative center: Blagoveshchenka

Area
  - Total: 3,700 km^{2} (1,400 sq mi)

Population (2010 Census)
  - Total: 30,783
  - Density: 8.3/km^{2} (22/sq mi)
  - Urban: 59.4%
  - Rural: 40.6%

Administrative structure
  - Administrative divisions: 2 Settlement administrations, 10 Selsoviets
  - Inhabited localities: 2 urban-type settlements, 28 rural localities

Municipal structure
  - Municipally incorporated as: Blagoveshchensky Municipal District
  - Municipal divisions: 2 urban settlements, 10 rural settlements
- Time zone: UTC+7 (MSK+4)
- OKTMO ID: 01605000
- Website: http://blag-admin.ru/

Blagoveshchensky District (Russian: Благове́щенский райо́н) is an administrative and municipal district (raion), one of the fifty-nine in Altai Krai, Russia. It is located in the west of the krai. The area of the district is 3,700 square kilometers (1,400 sq mi). Its administrative center is the urban locality (a work settlement) of Blagoveshchenka. Population: 30,783 (2010 census); 34,878 (2002 census); 44,849 (1989 Soviet census). The population of Blagoveshchenka accounts for 37.8% of the district's total population.

== Geography ==
Blagoveshchensky District is located in the northwest of Altai Krai, on flat terrain of the Kulunda Steppe of the West Siberian Plain. Much of the western border of the district is the shore of Lake Kulunda. There are over 20 bitter-salty and freshwater lakes in the district. Lake Kuchuk, the second largest lake, has mineral salts and medicinal muds. Bauzhansor lies 25 kilometers (16 mi) to the WSW and Zhigilda close to its northern end. The Kulunda River flows in a wide, waterlogged plain from east to west across the north of the district, before emptying into Lake Kulunda. The soils are brown soils and southern black soils, with large deposits of clay, gravel, and sand. Agriculture is supported on rectangular plots, covering 68.3% of the district.

Blagoveshchensky District is 210 km west of the regional city of Barnaul, and 2,650 km east of Moscow. The area measures 55 km (north-south), and 85 km (west-east); total area is 3,700 km2 (about 2% of Altai Krai). The administrative center is the town of Blagoveshchenka.

The district is bordered on the north by Suyetsky District, on the northeast by Bayevsky District, on the east by Zavyalovsky District, on the south by Rodinsky District, and on the west by Kulundinsky District.

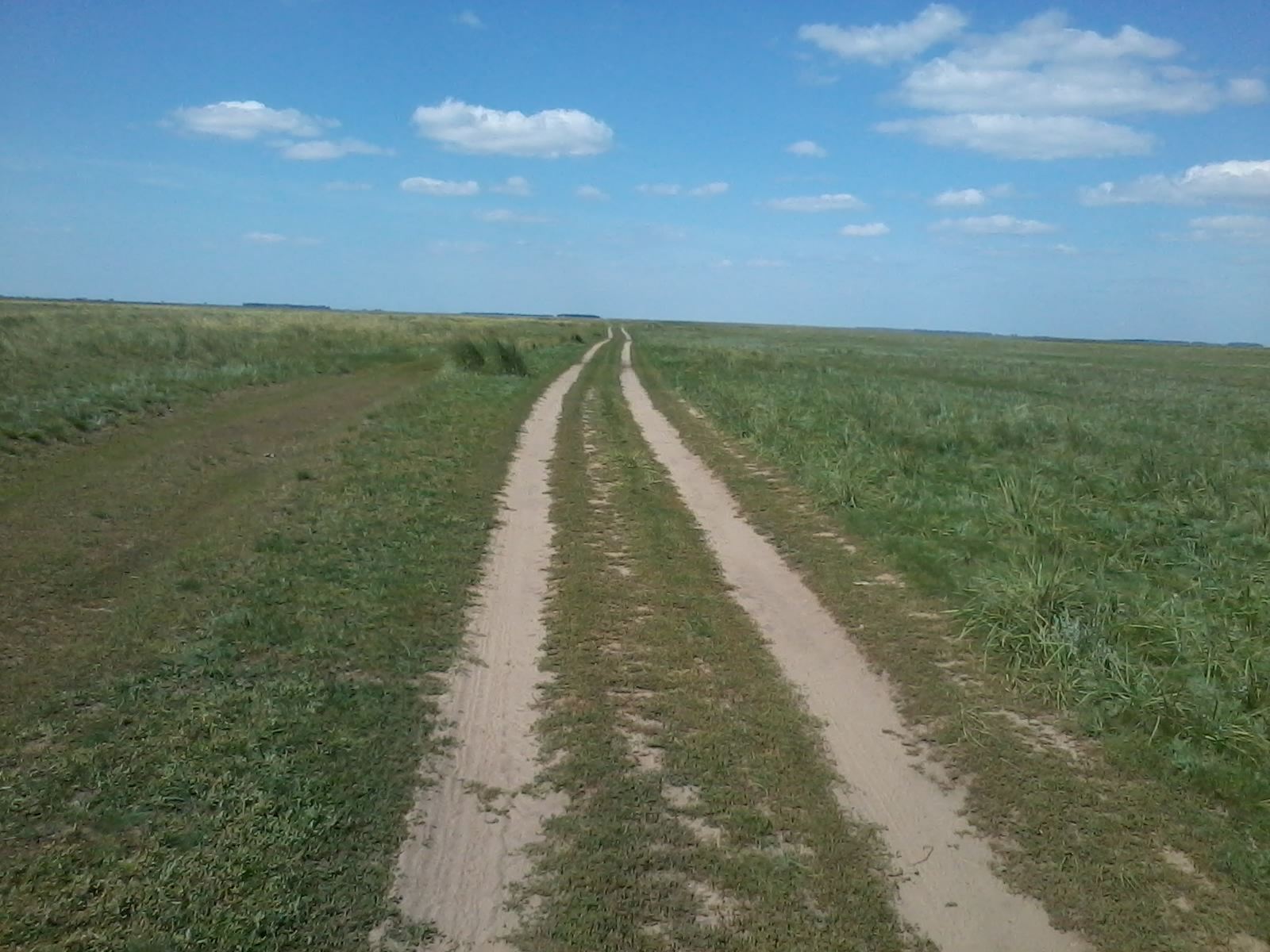
Steppe landscape
