= Kulunda (village) =

Kulunda Кулунда
- Selo
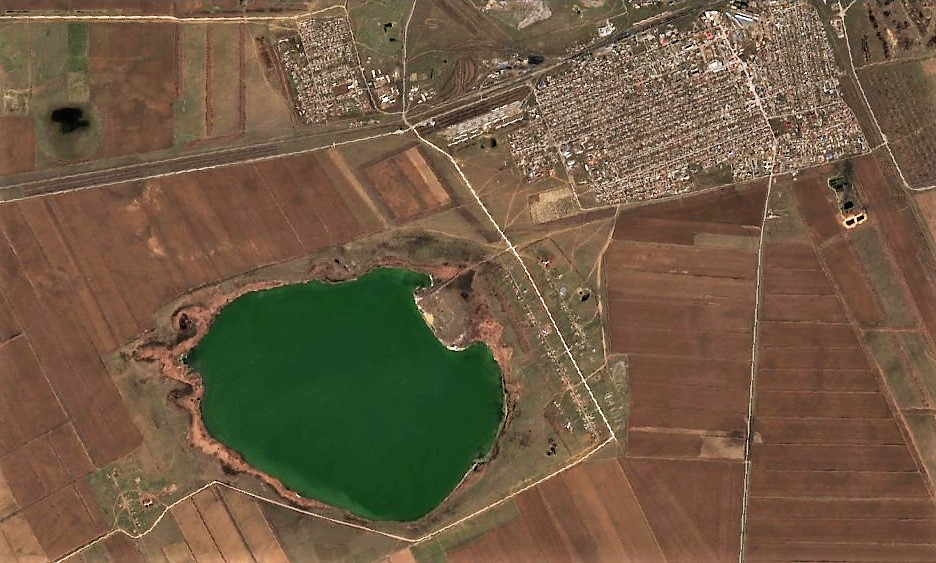
- Interactive map of Kulunda
- Location of Kulunda Kulunda (Altai Krai)
- Coordinates: 52°33′58″N 78°56′13″E
- Country: Russia
- Federal subject: Altai Krai
- Administrative district: Kulundinsky District
- SelsovietSelsoviet: Kulundinsky Selsoviet
- Founded: 1917

Population (2010 Census)
  - Total: 14,527
  - Estimate (2025): 14,560 (+0.2%)

Administrative status
  - Capital of: Kulundinsky District, Kulundinsky Selsoviet

Municipal status
  - Municipal district: Kulundinsky Municipal District
  - Rural settlement: Kulundinsky Selsoviet Rural Settlement
  - Capital of: Kulundinsky Municipal District, Kulundinsky Selsoviet Rural Settlement
- Time zone: UTC+7 (MSK+4)
- Postal code: 658920
- OKTMO ID: 01622460101

Kulunda (Russian: Кулунда) is a rural locality (a selo) and the administrative center of Kulundinsky District of Altai Krai, Russia. Population: 14,527 (2010 census); 15,466 (2002 census); 16,478 (1989 Soviet census). It is located on the Kazakhstan–Russia border.

== Geography ==
Kulunda is located in the area of the Kulunda Steppe, at the southern edge of the West Siberian Plain. Lake Shchekulduk lies to the southwest of the town. Myshkino is the nearest rural locality.
