= Kulundinsky District =

Kulundinsky District Кулундинский район (Russian)
- District
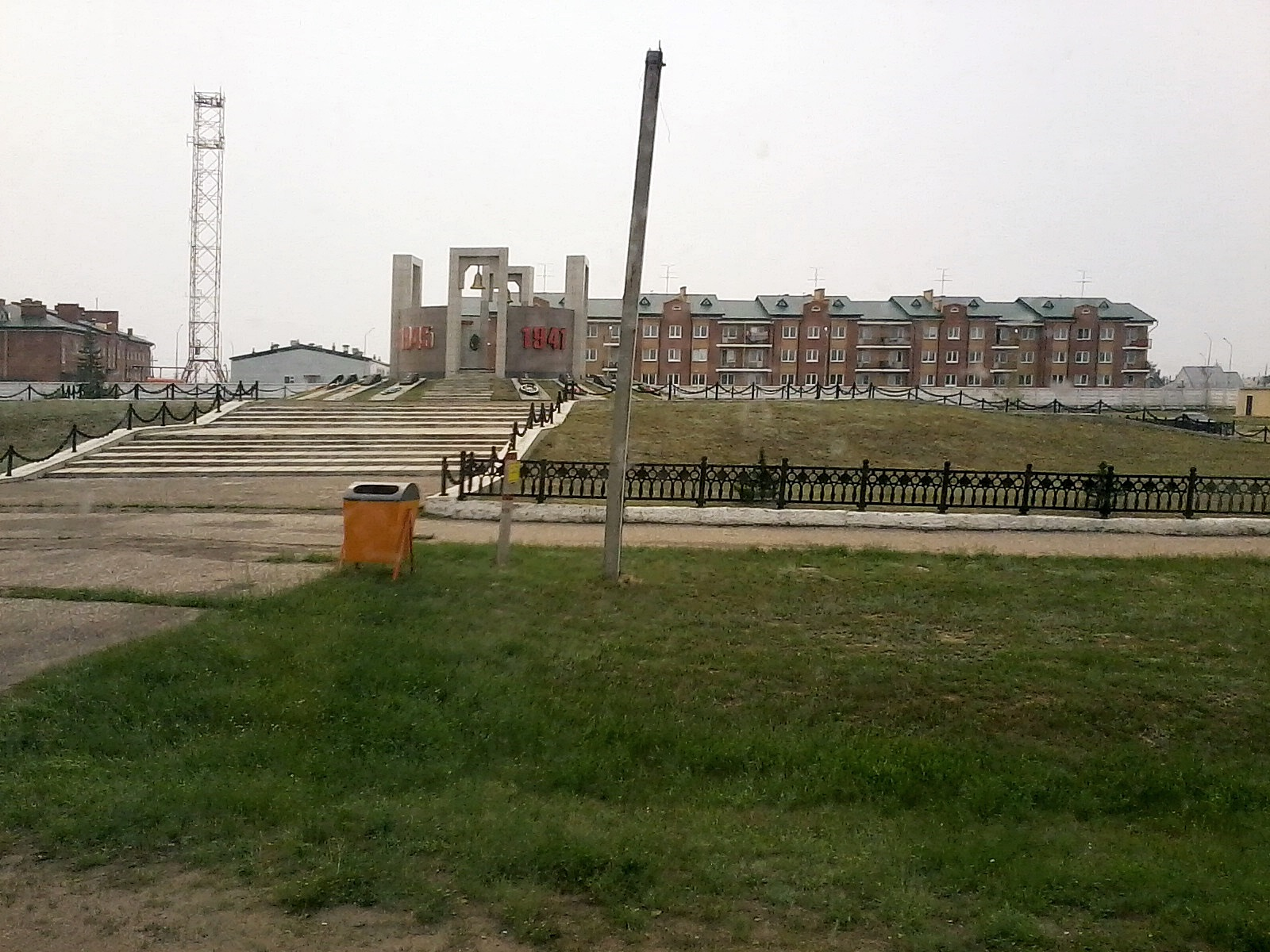
- Victory Memorial in Kulunda, the administrative center of Kulundinsky District
- Location of Kulundinsky District in Altai Krai
- Coordinates: 52°34′N 78°57′E
- Country: Russia
- Federal subject: Altai Krai
- Established: January 18, 1935
- Administrative center: Kulunda

Area
  - Total: 1,980 km^{2} (760 sq mi)

Population (2010 Census)
  - Total: 23,000
  - Density: 12/km^{2} (30/sq mi)
  - Urban: 0%
  - Rural: 100%

Administrative structure
  - Administrative divisions: 9 Selsoviets
  - Inhabited localities: 31 rural localities

Municipal structure
  - Municipally incorporated as: Kulundinsky Municipal District
  - Municipal divisions: 0 urban settlements, 9 rural settlements
- Time zone: UTC+7 (MSK+4)
- OKTMO ID: 01622000
- Website: http://кулундинский-район.рф

Population of Kulundinsky District
- 2010 Census: 23,000
- 2002 Census: 25,034
- 1989 Census: 27,133
- 1979 Census: 25,423

Kulundinsky District (Russian: Кулунди́нский райо́н) is an administrative and municipal district (raion), one of the fifty-nine in Altai Krai, Russia. It is located in the west of the krai. The area of the district is 1,980 square kilometers (760 sq mi). Its administrative center is the rural locality (a selo) of Kulunda. As of the 2010 Census, the total population of the district was 23,000, with the population of Kulunda accounting for 63.2% of that number.

== Geography ==
The district is located in the area of the Kulunda Steppe, at the southern edge of the West Siberian Plain. Lakes Shchekulduk, Dzhira, Gorkiye Kilty, and part of Bura are located in the district.

== History ==
The district was established on January 18, 1935 as Kiyevsky (Novo-Kiyevsky) District within West Siberian Krai. When Altai Krai was established in 1937, the district became a part of it. In June 1938, the administrative center of the district was transferred to Kulunda, and the district was given its present name as a result.
