= Sorokino =

Sorokino (Russian: Сорокино) may refer to several settlements in Russia:

- Sorokino, Starooskolsky District, Belgorod Oblast
- Sorokino, Alexandrovsky District, Vladimir Oblast
- Sorokino, Sudogodsky District, Vladimir Oblast
- Sorokino, Kichmengsko-Gorodetsky District, Vologda Oblast
- Sorokino, Nikolsky District, Vologda Oblast

== See also ==
- Peasant rebellion of Sorokino
- Bolshoye Sorokino
- Sorokyne, the Ukrainian-language cognate
