= Gavrilovka =

Gavrilovka (Russian: Гаври́ловка) is the name of several inhabited localities in Russia.

Urban localities

- Gavrilovka, Dzerzhinsk, Nizhny Novgorod Oblast, a work settlement under the administrative jurisdiction of the city of oblast significance of Dzerzhinsk in Nizhny Novgorod Oblast

Rural localities

- Gavrilovka, Bala-Chetyrmansky Selsoviet, Fyodorovsky District, Republic of Bashkortostan, a selo in Bala-Chetyrmansky Selsoviet of Fyodorovsky District in the Republic of Bashkortostan
- Gavrilovka, Fedorovsky Selsoviet, Fyodorovsky District, Republic of Bashkortostan, a village in Fedorovsky Selsoviet of Fyodorovsky District in the Republic of Bashkortostan
- Gavrilovka, Kugarchinsky District, Republic of Bashkortostan, a village in Irtyubyaksky Selsoviet of Kugarchinsky District in the Republic of Bashkortostan
- Gavrilovka, Kirovsky District, Kaluga Oblast, a village in Kirovsky District of Kaluga Oblast
- Gavrilovka, Tarussky District, Kaluga Oblast, a village in Tarussky District of Kaluga Oblast
- Gavrilovka, Republic of Karelia, a village in Olonetsky District of the Republic of Karelia
- Gavrilovka, Guryevsk, Kemerovo Oblast, a settlement under the administrative jurisdiction of the town of district significance of Salair under the administrative jurisdiction of Guryevsk City Under Oblast Jurisdiction in Kemerovo Oblast
- Gavrilovka, Kurtukovskaya Rural Territory, Novokuznetsky District, Kemerovo Oblast, a settlement in Kurtukovskaya Rural Territory of Novokuznetsky District in Kemerovo Oblast
- Gavrilovka, Kuzedeyevskaya Rural Territory, Novokuznetsky District, Kemerovo Oblast, a settlement in Kuzedeyevskaya Rural Territory of Novokuznetsky District in Kemerovo Oblast
- Gavrilovka, Komi Republic, a village in Palevitsy Administrative Territory of Syktyvdinsky District in the Komi Republic
- Gavrilovka, Krasnoyarsk Krai, a village in Yuzhno-Alexandrovsky Selsoviet of Ilansky District in Krasnoyarsk Krai
- Gavrilovka, Kursk Oblast, a village in Tolpinsky Selsoviet of Korenevsky District in Kursk Oblast
- Gavrilovka, Republic of Mordovia, a village in Novoalexandrovsky Selsoviet of Staroshaygovsky District in the Republic of Mordovia
- Gavrilovka, Semyonov, Nizhny Novgorod Oblast, a village in Shaldezhsky Selsoviet under the administrative jurisdiction of the city of oblast significance of Semyonov in Nizhny Novgorod Oblast
- Gavrilovka, Koverninsky District, Nizhny Novgorod Oblast, a village in Gavrilovsky Selsoviet of Koverninsky District in Nizhny Novgorod Oblast
- Gavrilovka, Kargatsky District, Novosibirsk Oblast, a settlement in Kargatsky District of Novosibirsk Oblast
- Gavrilovka, Kyshtovsky District, Novosibirsk Oblast, a village in Kyshtovsky District of Novosibirsk Oblast
- Gavrilovka, Abdulinsky District, Orenburg Oblast, a village in Yemantayevsky Selsoviet of Abdulinsky District in Orenburg Oblast
- Gavrilovka, Alexandrovsky District, Orenburg Oblast, a selo in Romanovsky Selsoviet of Alexandrovsky District in Orenburg Oblast
- Gavrilovka, Buzuluksky District, Orenburg Oblast, a village in Derzhavinsky Selsoviet of Buzuluksky District in Orenburg Oblast
- Gavrilovka, Saraktashsky District, Orenburg Oblast, a selo in Gavrilovsky Selsoviet of Saraktashsky District in Orenburg Oblast
- Gavrilovka, Penza Oblast, a selo in Anuchinsky Selsoviet of Kamensky District in Penza Oblast
- Gavrilovka, Rostov Oblast, a khutor in Kiyevskoye Rural Settlement of Kasharsky District in Rostov Oblast
- Gavrilovka, Samara Oblast, a selo in Alexeyevsky District of Samara Oblast
- Gavrilovka, Saratov Oblast, a selo in Baltaysky District of Saratov Oblast
- Gavrilovka, Smolensk Oblast, a village in Saveyevskoye Rural Settlement of Roslavlsky District in Smolensk Oblast
- Gavrilovka, Michurinsky District, Tambov Oblast, a selo in Zhidilovsky Selsoviet of Michurinsky District in Tambov Oblast
- Gavrilovka, Rzhaksinsky District, Tambov Oblast, a village in Gavrilovsky Selsoviet of Rzhaksinsky District in Tambov Oblast
- Gavrilovka, Ivanovsky Selsoviet, Sampursky District, Tambov Oblast, a village in Ivanovsky Selsoviet of Sampursky District in Tambov Oblast
- Gavrilovka, Sampursky Selsoviet, Sampursky District, Tambov Oblast, a selo in Sampursky Selsoviet of Sampursky District in Tambov Oblast
- Gavrilovka, Sosnovsky District, Tambov Oblast, a village in Olkhovsky Selsoviet of Sosnovsky District in Tambov Oblast
- Gavrilovka, Udmurt Republic, a village in Gavrilovsky Selsoviet of Votkinsky District in the Udmurt Republic
- Gavrilovka, Ulyanovsk Oblast, a selo in Mikhaylovsky Rural Okrug of Terengulsky District in Ulyanovsk Oblast

== See also ==
- Gavrilovka 2-ya
