= Afonino =

Afonino (Russian: Афонино) is the name of several rural localities in Russia.

== Altai Krai ==
As of 2010, two rural localities in Altai Krai bear this name:

- Afonino, Soltonsky District, Altai Krai, a selo in Makaryevsky Selsoviet of Soltonsky District
- Afonino, Zarinsky District, Altai Krai, a selo in Novodracheninsky Selsoviet of Zarinsky District

== Bryansk Oblast ==
As of 2010, two rural localities in Bryansk Oblast bear this name:

- Afonino, Sergeyevsky Selsoviet, Dubrovsky District, Bryansk Oblast, a village in Sergeyevsky Selsoviet of Dubrovsky District
- Afonino, Serpeyevsky Selsoviet, Dubrovsky District, Bryansk Oblast, a village in Serpeyevsky Selsoviet of Dubrovsky District

== Kostroma Oblast ==
As of 2010, six rural localities in Kostroma Oblast bear this name:

- Afonino, Baranovskoye Settlement, Buysky District, Kostroma Oblast, a village in Baranovskoye Settlement of Buysky District
- Afonino, Tsentralnoye Settlement, Buysky District, Kostroma Oblast, a village in Tsentralnoye Settlement of Buysky District
- Afonino, Galichsky District, Kostroma Oblast, a village in Dmitriyevskoye Settlement of Galichsky District
- Afonino, Oktyabrsky District, Kostroma Oblast, a village in Luptyugskoye Settlement of Oktyabrsky District
- Afonino, Nikolo-Polomskoye Settlement, Parfenyevsky District, Kostroma Oblast, a village in Nikolo-Polomskoye Settlement of Parfenyevsky District
- Afonino, Parfenyevskoye Settlement, Parfenyevsky District, Kostroma Oblast, a village in Parfenyevskoye Settlement of Parfenyevsky District

== Nizhny Novgorod Oblast ==
As of 2010, two rural localities in Nizhny Novgorod Oblast bear this name:

- Afonino, Kstovsky District, Nizhny Novgorod Oblast, a village in Afoninsky Selsoviet of Kstovsky District
- Afonino, Sokolsky District, Nizhny Novgorod Oblast, a village in Loyminsky Selsoviet of Sokolsky District

== Perm Krai ==
As of 2010, one rural locality in Perm Krai bears this name:

- Afonino, Perm Krai, a village in Yusvinsky District

== Smolensk Oblast ==
As of 2010, one rural locality in Smolensk Oblast bears this name:

- Afonino, Smolensk Oblast, a village in Ushakovskoye Rural Settlement of Dorogobuzhsky District

== Tver Oblast ==
As of 2010, four rural localities in Tver Oblast bear this name:

- Afonino, Belsky District, Tver Oblast, a village in Belsky District
- Afonino, Kalyazinsky District, Tver Oblast, a village in Kalyazinsky District
- Afonino, Kimrsky District, Tver Oblast, a village in Kimrsky District
- Afonino, Zharkovsky District, Tver Oblast, a village in Zharkovsky District

== Udmurt Republic ==
As of 2010, one rural locality in the Udmurt Republic bears this name:

- Afonino, Udmurt Republic, a village in Serginsky Selsoviet of Balezinsky District

== Vladimir Oblast ==
As of 2010, one rural locality in Vladimir Oblast bears this name:

- Afonino, Vladimir Oblast, a village in Sudogodsky District

== Vologda Oblast ==
As of 2010, three rural localities in Vologda Oblast bear this name:

- Afonino, Babayevsky District, Vologda Oblast, a village in Pozharsky Selsoviet of Babayevsky District
- Afonino, Dmitriyevsky Selsoviet, Cherepovetsky District, Vologda Oblast, a village in Dmitriyevsky Selsoviet of Cherepovetsky District
- Afonino, Malechkinsky Selsoviet, Cherepovetsky District, Vologda Oblast, a village in Malechkinsky Selsoviet of Cherepovetsky District

== Voronezh Oblast ==
As of 2010, one rural locality in Voronezh Oblast bears this name:

- Afonino, Voronezh Oblast, a khutor in Andreyevskoye Rural Settlement of Nizhnedevitsky District

== Yaroslavl Oblast ==
As of 2010, four rural localities in Yaroslavl Oblast bear this name:

- Afonino, Rozhalovsky Rural Okrug, Nekouzsky District, Yaroslavl Oblast, a village in Rozhalovsky Rural Okrug of Nekouzsky District
- Afonino, Spassky Rural Okrug, Nekouzsky District, Yaroslavl Oblast, a village in Spassky Rural Okrug of Nekouzsky District
- Afonino, Pereslavsky District, Yaroslavl Oblast, a village in Lychensky Rural Okrug of Pereslavsky District
- Afonino, Yaroslavsky District, Yaroslavl Oblast, a village in Mordvinovsky Rural Okrug of Yaroslavsky District
