= Zyryanovka =

Zyryanovka Зыряновка
- Selo
- Location within Altai Krai Location within Russia
- Coordinates: 53°46′N 85°24′E
- Country: Russia
- Region: Altai Krai
- District: Zarinsky District
- Time zone: UTC+7:00

Zyryanovka (Russian: Зыряновка) is a rural locality (a selo) and the administrative center of Zyryanovsky Selsoviet, Zarinsky District, Altai Krai, Russia. The population was 355 as of 2013. There are 10 streets.

== Geography ==
Zyryanovka is located 54 km east of Zarinsk (the district's administrative centre) by road. Zhulanikha is the nearest rural locality.
