= Gritsayevka =

Gritsayevka Грицаевка
- Khutor
- Location within Bashkortostan Location within Russia
- Coordinates: 53°03′N 55°03′E
- Country: Russia
- Region: Bashkortostan
- District: Fyodorovsky District
- Time zone: UTC+5:00

Gritsayevka (Russian: Грицаевка) is a rural locality (a khutor) in Dedovsky Selsoviet, Fyodorovsky District, Bashkortostan, Russia. The population was 29 as of 2010. There is 1 street.

== Geography ==
Gritsayevka is located 18 km southwest of Fyodorovka (the district's administrative centre) by road. Yurkovka is the nearest rural locality.
