= Deniskino =

Deniskino Денискино
- Selo
- Location within Bashkortostan Location within Russia
- Coordinates: 53°00′N 55°08′E
- Country: Russia
- Region: Bashkortostan
- District: Fyodorovsky District
- Time zone: UTC+5:00

Deniskino (Russian: Денискино) is a rural locality (a selo) and the administrative centre of Deniskinsky Selsoviet, Fyodorovsky District, Bashkortostan, Russia. The population was 637 as of 2010. There are 14 streets.

== Geography ==
Deniskino is located 23 km south of Fyodorovka (the district's administrative centre) by road. Novomikhaylovka is the nearest rural locality.
