= Balykly =

Balykly Балыклы
- Selo
- Location within Bashkortostan Location within Russia
- Coordinates: 53°05′N 55°18′E
- Country: Russia
- Region: Bashkortostan
- District: Fyodorovsky District
- Time zone: UTC+5:00

Balykly (Russian: Балыклы; Bashkir: Балыҡлы, Balıqlı) is a rural locality (a selo) and the administrative centre of Balyklinsky Selsoviet, Fyodorovsky District, Bashkortostan, Russia. The population was 677 as of 2010. There are 14 streets.

== Geography ==
Balykly is located 16 km southeast of Fyodorovka (the district's administrative centre) by road. Polynovka is the nearest rural locality.
