= Tenyayevo =

Tenyayevo Теняево
- Selo
- Location within Bashkortostan Location within Russia
- Coordinates: 53°13′N 55°06′E
- Country: Russia
- Region: Bashkortostan
- District: Fyodorovsky District
- Time zone: UTC+5:00

Tenyayevo (Russian: Теняево; Bashkir: Тәнәй, Tänäy) is a rural locality (a selo) and the administrative centre of Tenyayevsky Selsoviet, Fyodorovsky District, Bashkortostan, Russia. The population was 446 as of 2010. There are 6 streets.

== Geography ==
Tenyayevo is located 9 km northwest of Fyodorovka (the district's administrative centre) by road. Sashino is the nearest rural locality.
