= Russky Sukhoy Izyak =

Russky Sukhoy Izyak Русский Сухой Изяк
- Village
- Location within Bashkortostan Location within Russia
- Coordinates: 53°12′N 54°59′E
- Country: Russia
- Region: Bashkortostan
- District: Fyodorovsky District
- Time zone: UTC+5:00

Russky Sukhoy Izyak (Russian: Русский Сухой Изяк; Bashkir: Урыҫ Ҡоро Иҙәге, Urıś Qoro İźäge) is a rural locality (a village) in Pokrovsky Selsoviet, Fyodorovsky District, Bashkortostan, Russia. The population was 85 as of 2010. There is 1 street.

== Geography ==
Russky Sukhoy Izyak is located 21 km northwest of Fyodorovka (the district's administrative centre) by road. Tatarsky Sukhoy Izyak is the nearest rural locality.
