= Batyrovo =

Batyrovo Батырово
- Selo
- Location within Bashkortostan Location within Russia
- Coordinates: 52°58′N 55°17′E
- Country: Russia
- Region: Bashkortostan
- District: Fyodorovsky District
- Time zone: UTC+5:00

Batyrovo (Russian: Батырово; Bashkir: Батыр, Batır) is a rural locality (a selo) in Mikhaylovsky Selsoviet, Fyodorovsky District, Bashkortostan, Russia. The population was 441 as of 2010. There are 8 streets.

== Geography ==
Batyrovo is located 43 km southeast of Fyodorovka (the district's administrative centre) by road. Mikhaylovka is the nearest rural locality.
