= Golubtsovo =

Golubtsovo Голубцово
- Selo
- Location within Altai Krai Location within Russia
- Coordinates: 53°33′N 84°22′E
- Country: Russia
- Region: Altai Krai
- District: Zarinsky District
- Time zone: UTC+7:00

Golubtsovo (Russian: Голубцово) are a rural locality (a selo) in Novomonoshkinsky Selsoviet, Zarinsky District, Altai Krai, Russia. The population was 133 as of 2013. There are 4 streets.

== Geography ==
Golubtsovo is located 51 km southwest of Zarinsk (the district's administrative centre) by road. Novokopylovo is the nearest rural locality.
