= Starodrachenino =

Starodrachenino Стародраченино
- Selo
- Location within Altai Krai Location within Russia
- Coordinates: 53°40′N 85°04′E
- Country: Russia
- Region: Altai Krai
- District: Zarinsky District
- Time zone: UTC+7:00

Starodrachenino (Russian: Стародраченино) is a rural locality (a selo) and the administrative center of Starodracheninsky Selsoviet, Zarinsky District, Altai Krai, Russia. The population was 572 as of 2013. There are 11 streets.

== Geography ==
Starodrachenino is located 17 km southeast of Zarinsk (the district's administrative centre) by road. Komarskoye is the nearest rural locality.
