= Izhbulyak =

Izhbulyak Ижбуляк
- Selo
- Location within Bashkortostan Location within Russia
- Coordinates: 53°06′N 55°00′E
- Country: Russia
- Region: Bashkortostan
- District: Fyodorovsky District
- Time zone: UTC+5:00

Izhbulyak (Russian: Ижбуляк; Bashkir: Өсбүләк, Ösbüläk) is a rural locality (a selo) in Dedovsky Selsoviet, Fyodorovsky District, Bashkortostan, Russia. The population was 447 as of 2010. There are 10 streets.

== Geography ==
Izhbulyak is located 23 km southwest of Fyodorovka (the district's administrative centre) by road. Bazelevo is the nearest rural locality.
