= Aytugan-Durasovo =

Aytugan-Durasovo Айтуган-Дурасово
- Village
- Location within Bashkortostan Location within Russia
- Coordinates: 53°16′N 55°03′E
- Country: Russia
- Region: Bashkortostan
- District: Fyodorovsky District
- Time zone: UTC+5:00

Aytugan-Durasovo (Russian: Айтуган-Дурасово; Bashkir: Айтуған-Дурасов, Aytuğan-Durasov) is a rural locality (a village) in Tenyayevsky Selsoviet, Fyodorovsky District, Bashkortostan, Russia. The population was 38 as of 2010. There are 3 streets.

== Geography ==
Aytugan-Durasovo is located 14 km northwest of Fyodorovka (the district's administrative centre) by road. Verkhnyaya Mityukovka is the nearest rural locality.
