= Ulyadarovka =

Ulyadarovka Улядаровка
- Khutor
- Location within Bashkortostan Location within Russia
- Coordinates: 53°14′N 55°16′E
- Country: Russia
- Region: Bashkortostan
- District: Fyodorovsky District
- Time zone: UTC+5:00

Ulyadarovka (Russian: Улядаровка) is a rural locality (a khutor) in Fyodorovsky Selsoviet, Fyodorovsky District, Bashkortostan, Russia. The population was 11 as of 2010. There is 1 street.

== Geography ==
Ulyadarovka is located 11 km northeast of Fyodorovka (the district's administrative centre) by road. Kuzminovka is the nearest rural locality.
