= Alyoshkino =

Alyoshkino Алёшкино
- Selo
- Location within Bashkortostan Location within Russia
- Coordinates: 53°09′N 55°00′E
- Country: Russia
- Region: Bashkortostan
- District: Fyodorovsky District
- Time zone: UTC+5:00

Alyoshkino (Russian: Алёшкино) is a rural locality (a selo) in Goncharovsky Selsoviet, Fyodorovsky District, Bashkortostan, Russia. The population was 240 as of 2010. There are 4 streets.

== Geography ==
Alyoshkino is located 14 km west of Fyodorovka (the district's administrative centre) by road. Goncharovka is the nearest rural locality.
