= Grishino, Altai Krai =

Grishino Гришино
- Selo
- Location within Altai Krai Location within Russia
- Coordinates: 53°34′N 84°54′E
- Country: Russia
- Region: Altai Krai
- District: Zarinsky District
- Time zone: UTC+7:00

Grishino (Russian: Гришино) is a rural locality (a selo) and the administrative center of Grishinsky Selsoviet, Zarinsky District, Altai Krai, Russia. The population was 476 as of 2013. There are 6 streets.

== Geography ==
Grishino is located 18 km south of Zarinsk (the district's administrative centre) by road. Zudilovo is the nearest rural locality.
