= Bala-Chetyrman =

Bala-Chetyrman Бала-Четырман
- Selo
- Location within Bashkortostan Location within Russia
- Coordinates: 53°05′N 55°25′E
- Country: Russia
- Region: Bashkortostan
- District: Fyodorovsky District
- Time zone: UTC+5:00

Bala-Chetyrman (Russian: Бала-Четырман; Bashkir: Бала Сытырман, Bala Sıtırman) is a rural locality (a selo) and the administrative centre of Bala-Chetyrmansky Selsoviet, Fyodorovsky District, Bashkortostan, Russia. The population was 1,426 as of 2010. There are 14 streets.

== Geography ==
Bala-Chetyrman is located 23 km southeast of Fyodorovka (the district's administrative centre) by road. Stary Chetyrman is the nearest rural locality.
