= Saitovo, Fyodorovsky District, Republic of Bashkortostan =

Saitovo Саитово
- Village
- Location within Bashkortostan Location within Russia
- Coordinates: 53°02′N 55°37′E
- Country: Russia
- Region: Bashkortostan
- District: Fyodorovsky District
- Time zone: UTC+5:00

Saitovo (Russian: Саитово; Bashkir: Һәйет, Häyet) is a rural locality (a village) in Razinsky Selsoviet, Fyodorovsky District, Bashkortostan, Russia. The population was 307 as of 2010. There are 4 streets.

== Geography ==
Saitovo is located 37 km southeast of Fyodorovka (the district's administrative centre) by road. Saitovsky is the nearest rural locality.
