= Sashino =

Sashino Сашино
- Village
- Location within Bashkortostan Location within Russia
- Coordinates: 53°14′N 55°05′E
- Country: Russia
- Region: Bashkortostan
- District: Fyodorovsky District
- Time zone: UTC+5:00

Sashino (Russian: Сашино) is a rural locality (a village) in Tenyayevsky Selsoviet, Fyodorovsky District, Bashkortostan, Russia. The population was 2 as of 2010. There is 1 street.

== Geography ==
Sashino is located 10 km northwest of Fyodorovka (the district's administrative centre) by road. Tenyayevo is the nearest rural locality.
