= Novodrachyonino =

Novodrachyonino Новодрачёнино
- Settlement
- Location within Altai Krai Location within Russia
- Coordinates: 53°47′N 85°07′E
- Country: Russia
- Region: Altai Krai
- District: Zarinsky District
- Time zone: UTC+7:00

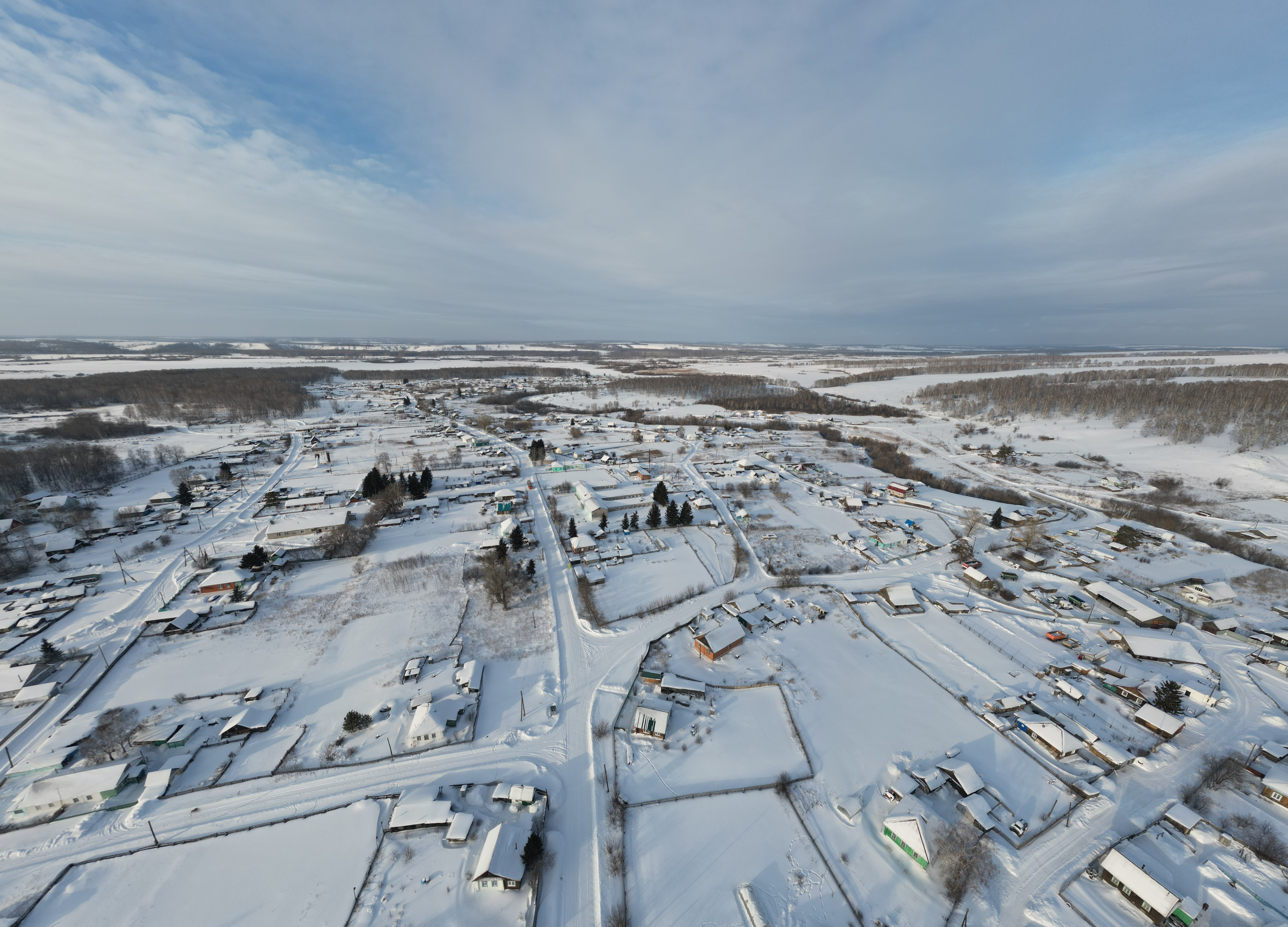

Novodrachyonino (Russian: Новодрачёнино) is a rural locality (a settlement) in Novodrachyoninsky Selsoviet, Zarinsky District, Altai Krai, Russia. The population was 728 as of 2013. There are 10 streets.

== Geography ==
Novodrachyonino is located 34 km northeast of Zarinsk (the district's administrative centre) by road. Avdeyevskaya Baza is the nearest rural locality.
