= Lvovka =

Lvovka Львовка
- Village
- Location within Bashkortostan Location within Russia
- Coordinates: 52°56′N 55°35′E
- Country: Russia
- Region: Bashkortostan
- District: Fyodorovsky District
- Time zone: UTC+5:00

Lvovka (Russian: Львовка) is a rural locality (a village) in Pugachevsky Selsoviet, Fyodorovsky District, Bashkortostan, Russia. The population was 18 as of 2010. There is 1 street. It takes its name from the Ukrainian city Lviv.

== Geography ==
Lvovka is located 51 km southeast of Fyodorovka (the district's administrative centre) by road.
