= Dedovo, Republic of Bashkortostan =

Dedovo Дедово
- Selo
- Location within Bashkortostan Location within Russia
- Coordinates: 53°03′N 55°04′E
- Country: Russia
- Region: Bashkortostan
- District: Fyodorovsky District
- Time zone: UTC+5:00

Dedovo (Russian: Дедово) is a rural locality (a selo) and the administrative centre of Dedovsky Selsoviet, Fyodorovsky District, Bashkortostan, Russia. The population was 328 as of 2010. There are 6 streets.

== Geography ==
Dedovo is located 16 km southwest of Fyodorovka (the district's administrative centre) by road. Novaya Derevnya is the nearest rural locality.
