= Gorokhovka, Republic of Bashkortostan =

Gorokhovka Гороховка
- Village
- Location within Bashkortostan Location within Russia
- Coordinates: 53°14′N 54°55′E
- Country: Russia
- Region: Bashkortostan
- District: Fyodorovsky District
- Time zone: UTC+5:00

Gorokhovka (Russian: Гороховка) is a rural locality (a village) in Pokrovsky Selsoviet, Fyodorovsky District, Bashkortostan, Russia. The population was 81 as of 2010. There is 1 street.

== Geography ==
Gorokhovka is located 21 km northwest of Fyodorovka (the district's administrative centre) by road. Pokrovka is the nearest rural locality.
