= Staroglushinka =

Staroglushinka Староглушинка
- Selo
- Location within Altai Krai Location within Russia
- Coordinates: 53°47′N 84°41′E
- Country: Russia
- Region: Altai Krai
- District: Zarinsky District
- Time zone: UTC+7:00

Staroglushinka (Russian: Староглушинка) is a rural locality (a selo) in Gonoshikhinsky Selsoviet, Zarinsky District, Altai Krai, Russia. The population was 212 as of 2013. There are 8 streets.

== Geography ==
Staroglushinka is located 25 km northwest of Zarinsk (the district's administrative centre) by road. Novokrasilovo is the nearest rural locality.
