= Smaznevo =

Smaznevo Смазнево
- Station
- Location within Altai Krai Location within Russia
- Coordinates: 53°50′N 85°12′E
- Country: Russia
- Region: Altai Krai
- District: Zarinsky District
- Time zone: UTC+7:00

Smaznevo (Russian: Смазнево) is a rural locality (a station) and the administrative center of Smaznevsky Selsoviet, Zarinsky District, Altai Krai, Russia. The population was 1,193 as of 2013. There are 22 streets.

== Geography ==
Smaznevo is located 38 km northeast of Zarinsk (the district's administrative centre) by road.
