= Polynovka =

Polynovka Полыновка
- Village
- Location within Bashkortostan Location within Russia
- Coordinates: 53°05′N 55°22′E
- Country: Russia
- Region: Bashkortostan
- District: Fyodorovsky District
- Time zone: UTC+5:00

Polynovka (Russian: Полыновка) is a rural locality (a village) in Balyklinsky Selsoviet, Fyodorovsky District, Bashkortostan, Russia. The population was 6 as of 2010. There is 1 street.

== Geography ==
Polynovka is located 19 km southeast of Fyodorovka (the district's administrative centre) by road. Balykly is the nearest rural locality.
