= Novoyaushevo, Fyodorovsky District, Republic of Bashkortostan =

Novoyaushevo Новояушево
- Selo
- Location within Bashkortostan Location within Russia
- Coordinates: 53°02′N 55°22′E
- Country: Russia
- Region: Bashkortostan
- District: Fyodorovsky District
- Time zone: UTC+5:00

Novoyaushevo (Russian: Новояушево; Bashkir: Яңы Яуыш, Yañı Yawış) is a rural locality (a selo) in Bala-Chetyrmansky Selsoviet, Fyodorovsky District, Bashkortostan, Russia. The population was 350 as of 2010. There are 5 streets.

== Geography ==
Novoyaushevo is located 30 km southeast of Fyodorovka (the district's administrative centre) by road. Novosofiyevka is the nearest rural locality.
