= Tatarsky Sukhoy Izyak =

Tatarsky Sukhoy Izyak Татарский Сухой Изяк
- Selo
- Location within Bashkortostan Location within Russia
- Coordinates: 53°13′N 54°58′E
- Country: Russia
- Region: Bashkortostan
- District: Fyodorovsky District
- Time zone: UTC+5:00

Tatarsky Sukhoy Izyak (Russian: Татарский Сухой Изяк; Bashkir: Татар Ҡоро Иҙәге, Tatar Qoro İźäge) is a rural locality (a selo) in Pokrovsky Selsoviet, Fyodorovsky District, Bashkortostan, Russia. The population was 155 as of 2010. There is 1 street.

== Geography ==
Tatarsky Sukhoy Izyak is located 19 km northwest of Fyodorovka (the district's administrative centre) by road. Russky Sukhoy Izyak is the nearest rural locality.
