= Akbulatovo, Fyodorovsky District, Republic of Bashkortostan =

Akbulatovo Акбулатово
- Selo
- Location within Bashkortostan Location within Russia
- Coordinates: 53°08′N 55°08′E
- Country: Russia
- Region: Bashkortostan
- District: Fyodorovsky District
- Time zone: UTC+5:00

Akbulatovo (Russian: Акбулатово; Bashkir: Аҡбулат, Aqbulat) is a rural locality (a selo) in Fyodorovsky Selsoviet, Fyodorovsky District, Bashkortostan, Russia. The population was 308 as of 2010. There are 3 streets.

== Geography ==
Akbulatovo is located 6 km southwest of Fyodorovka (the district's administrative centre) by road. Nikolayevka is the nearest rural locality.
