= Ishmukhametovo, Fyodorovsky District, Republic of Bashkortostan =

Ishmukhametovo Ишмухаметово
- Village
- Location within Bashkortostan Location within Russia
- Coordinates: 53°09′N 55°28′E
- Country: Russia
- Region: Bashkortostan
- District: Fyodorovsky District
- Time zone: UTC+5:00

Ishmukhametovo (Russian: Ишмухаметово; Bashkir: Ишмөхәмәт, İşmöxämät) is a rural locality (a village) in Bala-Chetyrmansky Selsoviet, Fyodorovsky District, Bashkortostan, Russia. The population was 73 as of 2010. There is 1 street.

== Geography ==
Ishmukhametovo is located 34 km east of Fyodorovka (the district's administrative centre) by road. Polyakovka is the nearest rural locality.
