= Zlatoustovka =

Zlatoustovka Златоустовка
- Village
- Location within Bashkortostan Location within Russia
- Coordinates: 53°09′N 55°30′E
- Country: Russia
- Region: Bashkortostan
- District: Fyodorovsky District
- Time zone: UTC+5:00

Zlatoustovka (Russian: Златоустовка) is a rural locality (a village) in Bala-Chetyrmansky Selsoviet, Fyodorovsky District, Bashkortostan, Russia. The population was 279 as of 2010. There are 3 streets.

== Geography ==
Zlatoustovka is located 33 km east of Fyodorovka (the district's administrative centre) by road. Fedotovka is the nearest rural locality.
