= Veselovka, Fyodorovsky District, Republic of Bashkortostan =

Veselovka Веселовка
- Village
- Location within Bashkortostan Location within Russia
- Coordinates: 53°00′N 55°12′E
- Country: Russia
- Region: Bashkortostan
- District: Fyodorovsky District
- Time zone: UTC+5:00

Veselovka (Russian: Веселовка) is a rural locality (a village) in Deniskinsky Selsoviet, Fyodorovsky District, Bashkortostan, Russia. The population was 233 as of 2010. There are 6 streets.

== Geography ==
Veselovka is located 27 km south of Fyodorovka (the district's administrative centre) by road. Deniskino is the nearest rural locality.
