= Yuldashevo, Fyodorovsky District, Republic of Bashkortostan =

Yuldashevo Юлдашево
- Selo
- Location within Bashkortostan Location within Russia
- Coordinates: 52°51′N 55°11′E
- Country: Russia
- Region: Bashkortostan
- District: Fyodorovsky District
- Time zone: UTC+5:00

Yuldashevo (Russian: Юлдашево; Bashkir: Юлдаш, Yuldaş) is a rural locality (a selo) in Mikhaylovsky Selsoviet, Fyodorovsky District, Bashkortostan, Russia. The population was 391 as of 2010. There are 4 streets.

== Geography ==
Yuldashevo is located 52 km south of Fyodorovka (the district's administrative centre) by road. Mikhaylovka is the nearest rural locality.
