= Klyuchevka, Fyodorovsky District, Republic of Bashkortostan =

Klyuchevka Ключевка
- Village
- Location within Bashkortostan Location within Russia
- Coordinates: 53°04′N 55°31′E
- Country: Russia
- Region: Bashkortostan
- District: Fyodorovsky District
- Time zone: UTC+5:00

Klyuchevka (Russian: Ключевка) is a rural locality (a village) and the administrative centre of Razinsky Selsoviet, Fyodorovsky District, Bashkortostan, Russia. The population was 273 as of 2010. There are 2 streets.

== Geography ==
Klyuchevka is located 30 km southeast of Fyodorovka (the district's administrative centre) by road. Saitovo is the nearest rural locality.
