= Golukha =

Golukha Голуха
- Settlement
- Location within Altai Krai Location within Russia
- Coordinates: 53°50′N 85°25′E
- Country: Russia
- Region: Altai Krai
- District: Zarinsky District
- Time zone: UTC+7:00

Golukha (Russian: Голуха) is a rural locality (a settlement) and the administrative center of Golukhinsky Selsoviet of Zarinsky District, Altai Krai, Russia. The population was 1660 as of 2016. There are 18 streets.

== Geography ==
Golukha is located 54 km northeast of Zarinsk (the district's administrative centre) by road. is the nearest rural locality. Mironovka is the nearest rural locality.
