= Omutnaya =

Omutnaya Омутная
- Settlement
- Location within Altai Krai Location within Russia
- Coordinates: 53°38′N 84°52′E
- Country: Russia
- Region: Altai Krai
- District: Zarinsky District
- Time zone: UTC+7:00

Omutnaya (Russian: Омутная) is a rural locality (a settlement) in Verkh-Kamyshensky Selsoviet, Zarinsky District, Altai Krai, Russia. The population was 36 as of 2013. There are 3 streets.

== Geography ==
Omutnaya is located 10 km southwest of Zarinsk (the district's administrative centre) by road. Batunny is the nearest rural locality.
