= Stary Chetyrman =

Stary Chetyrman Старый Четырман
- Selo
- Location within Bashkortostan Location within Russia
- Coordinates: 53°06′N 55°25′E
- Country: Russia
- Region: Bashkortostan
- District: Fyodorovsky District
- Time zone: UTC+5:00

Stary Chetyrman (Russian: Старый Четырман; Bashkir: Иҫке Сытырман, İśke Sıtırman) is a rural locality (a selo) in Bala-Chetyrmansky Selsoviet, Fyodorovsky District, Bashkortostan, Russia. The population was 291 as of 2010. There are 4 streets.

== Geography ==
Stary Chetyrman is located 24 km southeast of Fyodorovka (the district's administrative centre) by road. Bala-Chetyrman is the nearest rural locality.
