= Tyagun =

Tyagun Тягун
- Station
- Location within Altai Krai Location within Russia
- Coordinates: 53°56′N 85°39′E
- Country: Russia
- Region: Altai Krai
- District: Zarinsky District
- Time zone: UTC+7:00

Tyagun (Russian: Тягун) is a rural locality (a station) and the administrative center of Tyagunsky Selsoviet, Zarinsky District, Altai Krai, Russia. The population was 1,926 as of 2013. There are 40 streets.

== Geography ==
Tyagun is located 52 km southeast of Zarinsk (the district's administrative centre) by road. Kytmanushka is the nearest rural locality.
