= Bazelevo =

Bazelevo Базелево
- Village
- Location within Bashkortostan Location within Russia
- Coordinates: 53°05′N 55°02′E
- Country: Russia
- Region: Bashkortostan
- District: Fyodorovsky District
- Time zone: UTC+5:00

Bazelevo (Russian: Базелево) is a rural locality (a village) in Dedovsky Selsoviet, Fyodorovsky District, Bashkortostan, Russia. The population was 1 as of 2010. There is 1 street.

== Geography ==
Bazelevo is located 20 km southwest of Fyodorovka (the district's administrative centre) by road. Izhbulyak is the nearest rural locality.
