= Verkhny Alyshtan =

Verkhny Alyshtan Верхний Алыштан
- Village
- Location within Bashkortostan Location within Russia
- Coordinates: 53°17′N 55°08′E
- Country: Russia
- Region: Bashkortostan
- District: Fyodorovsky District
- Time zone: UTC+5:00

Verkhny Alyshtan (Russian: Верхний Алыштан; Bashkir: Үрге Алаштан, Ürge Alaştan) is a rural locality (a village) and the administrative centre of Bulyakayevsky Selsoviet, Fyodorovsky District, Bashkortostan, Russia. The population was 351 as of 2010. There are 2 streets.

== Geography ==
Verkhny Alyshtan is located 15 km north of Fyodorovka (the district's administrative centre) by road. Nizhny Alyshtan is the nearest rural locality.
