= Verkh-Kamyshenka =

Verkh-Kamyshenka Верх-Камышенка
- Selo
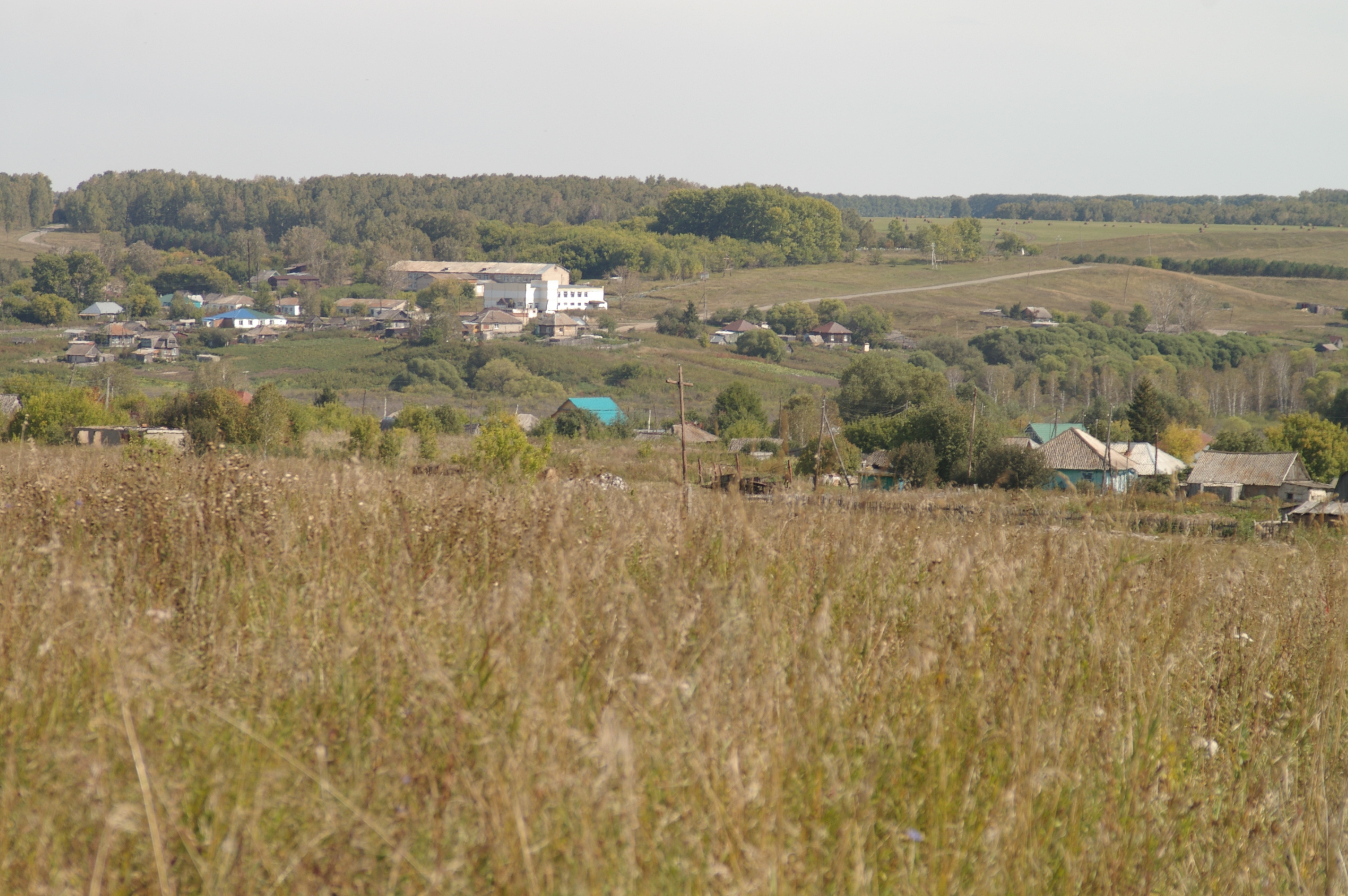

- Location within Altai Krai Location within Russia
- Coordinates: 53°35′N 84°47′E
- Country: Russia
- Region: Altai Krai
- District: Zarinsky District
- Time zone: UTC+7:00

Verkh-Kamyshenka (Russian: Верх-Камышенка) is a rural locality (a selo) and the administrative center of Verkh-Kamyshensky Selsoviet, Zarinsky District, Altai Krai, Russia. The population was 705 as of 2013. There are 16 streets.

== Geography ==
Verkh-Kamyshenka is located 20 km southwest of Zarinsk (the district's administrative centre) by road. Grishino is the nearest rural locality.
