= Nizhny Alyshtan =

Selo in Bashkortostan, Russia

Nizhny Alyshtan Нижний Алыштан
- Selo
- Location within Bashkortostan Location within Russia
- Coordinates: 53°18′N 55°10′E
- Country: Russia
- Region: Bashkortostan
- District: Fyodorovsky District
- Time zone: UTC+5:00

Nizhny Alyshtan (Russian: Нижний Алыштан; Bashkir: Түбәнге Алаштан, Tübänge Alaştan) is a rural locality (a selo) in Bulyakayevsky Selsoviet, Fyodorovsky District, Bashkortostan, Russia. The population was 88 as of 2010. There is one street.

== Geography ==
Nizhny Alyshtan is located 17 km north of Fyodorovka (the district's administrative centre) by road. Verkhny Alyshtan is the nearest rural locality.
