= Alambay =

Alambay Аламбай
- Station
- Location within Altai Krai Location within Russia
- Coordinates: 54°01′N 85°52′E
- Country: Russia
- Region: Altai Krai
- District: Zarinsky District
- Time zone: UTC+7:00

Alambay (Russian: Аламбай) is a rural locality (a station) and the administrative center of Alambaysky Selsoviet of Zarinsky District, Altai Krai, Russia. The population was 502 as of 2016. There are 10 streets.

== Geography ==
The station is located in the east of the Zarinsky District, 70 km from Zarinsk.
