= Gogolevka =

Gogolevka Гоголевка
- Village
- Location within Bashkortostan Location within Russia
- Coordinates: 53°10′N 55°19′E
- Country: Russia
- Region: Bashkortostan
- District: Fyodorovsky District
- Time zone: UTC+5:00

Gogolevka (Russian: Гоголевка) is a rural locality (a village) in Verkhneyaushevsky Selsoviet, Fyodorovsky District, Bashkortostan, Russia. The population was 36 as of 2010. There are 2 streets.

== Geography ==
Gogolevka is located 11 km east of Fyodorovka (the district's administrative centre) by road. Verkhneyaushevo is the nearest rural locality.
