= Salairsky =

Salairsky (masculine), Salairskaya (feminine), or Salairskoye (neuter) may refer to:

- Salair Ridge (Salairsky kryazh), an eroded highland in southwestern Siberia, Russia
- Salairskoye Urban Settlement, a municipal formation which the town of district significance of Salair subordinated to Guryevsk Town Under Oblast Jurisdiction in Kemerovo Oblast, Russia is incorporated as
- Salairskoye mine, a lead mine in Novosibirsk Oblast, Russia
