= Komarskoye =

Komarskoye Комарское
- Village
- Location within Altai Krai Location within Russia
- Coordinates: 53°38′N 85°05′E
- Country: Russia
- Region: Altai Krai
- District: Zarinsky District
- Time zone: UTC+7:00

Komarskoye (Russian: Комарское) is a rural locality (a selo) and the administrative center of Komarsky Selsoviet of Zarinsky District, Altai Krai, Russia. The population was 633 as of 2016. There are 7 streets.

== Geography ==
Komarskoye is located 16 km southeast of Zarinsk (the district's administrative centre) by road. Starodrachenino is the nearest rural locality.

== Ethnicity ==
The village is inhabited by Russians and others.
