= Karalachik =

Karalachik Каралачик
- Selo
- Location within Bashkortostan Location within Russia
- Coordinates: 53°06′N 55°12′E
- Country: Russia
- Region: Bashkortostan
- District: Fyodorovsky District
- Time zone: UTC+5:00

Karalachik (Russian: Каралачик; Bashkir: Ҡораласыҡ, Qoralasıq) is a rural locality (a selo) and the administrative centre of Karalachiksky Selsoviet, Fyodorovsky District, Bashkortostan, Russia. The population was 553 as of 2010. There are 16 streets.

== Geography ==
Karalachik is located 12 km southeast of Fyodorovka (the district's administrative centre) by road. Balyklybashevo is the nearest rural locality.
