= Balyklybashevo =

Balyklybashevo Балыклыбашево
- Selo
- Location within Bashkortostan Location within Russia
- Coordinates: 53°07′N 55°11′E
- Country: Russia
- Region: Bashkortostan
- District: Fyodorovsky District
- Time zone: UTC+5:00

Balyklybashevo (Russian: Балыклыбашево; Bashkir: Балыҡлыбаш, Balıqlıbaş) is a rural locality (a selo) in Karalachiksky Selsoviet, Fyodorovsky District, Bashkortostan, Russia. There are 5 streets.

== Demographics ==
The population was 161 as of 2010.

== Geography ==
Balyklybashevo is located 9 km south of Fyodorovka (the district's administrative centre) by road. Karalachik is the nearest rural locality.
