= Novaya Derevnya, Fyodorovsky District, Republic of Bashkortostan =

Novaya Derevnya Новая Деревня
- Khutor
- Location within Bashkortostan Location within Russia
- Coordinates: 53°03′N 55°05′E
- Country: Russia
- Region: Bashkortostan
- District: Fyodorovsky District
- Time zone: UTC+5:00

Novaya Derevnya (Russian: Новая Деревня) is a rural locality (a khutor) in Dedovsky Selsoviet, Fyodorovsky District, Bashkortostan, Russia. The population was 71 as of 2010. There are 2 streets.

== Geography ==
Novaya Derevnya is located 16 km southwest of Fyodorovka (the district's administrative centre) by road. Dedovo is the nearest rural locality.
