= Kiryushkino =

Kiryushkino Кирюшкино
- Selo
- Location within Bashkortostan Location within Russia
- Coordinates: 52°58′N 55°09′E
- Country: Russia
- Region: Bashkortostan
- District: Fyodorovsky District
- Time zone: UTC+5:00

Kiryushkino (Russian: Кирюшкино) is a rural locality (a selo) in Deniskinsky Selsoviet, Fyodorovsky District, Bashkortostan, Russia. The population was 358 as of 2010. There are 5 streets.

== Geography ==
Kiryushkino is located 29 km south of Fyodorovka (the district's administrative centre) by road. Novosyolka is the nearest rural locality.
