= Bulyakay, Fyodorovsky District, Republic of Bashkortostan =

Bulyakay Булякай
- Village
- Location within Bashkortostan Location within Russia
- Coordinates: 53°15′N 55°10′E
- Country: Russia
- Region: Bashkortostan
- District: Fyodorovsky District
- Time zone: UTC+5:00

Bulyakay (Russian: Булякай; Bashkir: Бүләкәй, Büläkäy) is a rural locality (a village) in Bulyakayevsky Selsoviet, Fyodorovsky District, Bashkortostan, Russia. The population was 62 as of 2010. There is 1 street.

== Geography ==
Bulyakay is located 13 km north of Fyodorovka (the district's administrative centre) by road. Verkhny Alyshtan is the nearest rural locality.
