= Verkhnyaya Mityukovka =

Verkhnyaya Mityukovka Верхняя Митюковка
- Khutor
- Location within Bashkortostan Location within Russia
- Coordinates: 53°15′N 55°04′E
- Country: Russia
- Region: Bashkortostan
- District: Fyodorovsky District
- Time zone: UTC+5:00

Verkhnyaya Mityukovka (Russian: Верхняя Митюковка) is a rural locality (a khutor) in Tenyayevsky Selsoviet, Fyodorovsky District, Bashkortostan, Russia. The population was 3 in 2010. There is one street.

== Geography ==
Verkhnyaya Mityukovka is located 12 km northwest of Fyodorovka (the district's administrative centre) by road. Aytugan-Durasovo is the nearest rural locality.
