= Shpagino =

Shpagino Шпагино
- Selo
- Location within Altai Krai Location within Russia
- Coordinates: 53°34′N 84°33′E
- Country: Russia
- Region: Altai Krai
- District: Zarinsky District
- Time zone: UTC+7:00

Shpagino (Russian: Шпагино) is a rural locality (a selo) in Novomonoshkinsky Selsoviet, Zarinsky District, Altai Krai, Russia. The population was 118 as of 2013. There are 7 streets.

== Geography ==
Shpagino is located 41 km southwest of Zarinsk (the district's administrative centre) by road. Novomonoshkino is the nearest rural locality.
