= Staronikolayevka =

Staronikolayevka Старониколаевка
- Village
- Location within Bashkortostan Location within Russia
- Coordinates: 53°15′N 54°58′E
- Country: Russia
- Region: Bashkortostan
- District: Fyodorovsky District
- Time zone: UTC+5:00

Staronikolayevka (Russian: Старониколаевка) is a rural locality (a village) in Pokrovsky Selsoviet, Fyodorovsky District, Bashkortostan, Russia. The population was 51 as of 2010. There is 1 street.

== Geography ==
Staronikolayevka is located 22 km northwest of Fyodorovka (the district's administrative centre) by road. Pokrovka is the nearest rural locality.
