= Guryevskoye Urban Settlement =

Guryevskoye Urban Settlement is the name of several municipal formations in Russia.

Modern entities

- Guryevskoye Urban Settlement, a municipal formation within Guryevsky Municipal District which Guryevsk Town Under Oblast Jurisdiction in Kemerovo Oblast is incorporated as

Historical entities

- Guryevskoye Urban Settlement, a municipal formation which the town of district significance of Guryevsk in Guryevsky District of Kaliningrad Oblast was incorporated as; it was abolished when Guryevsky Municipal District was transformed into Guryevsky Urban Okrug on May 31, 2013

== See also ==
- Guryevsky
