= Verkhneyaushevo =

Verkhneyaushevo Верхнеяушево
- Selo
- Location within Bashkortostan Location within Russia
- Coordinates: 53°10′N 55°16′E
- Country: Russia
- Region: Bashkortostan
- District: Fyodorovsky District
- Time zone: UTC+5:00

Verkhneyaushevo (Russian: Верхнеяушево; Bashkir: Үрге Яуыш, Ürge Yawış) is a rural locality (a selo) and the administrative centre of Verkhneyaushevsky Selsoviet, Fyodorovsky District, Bashkortostan, Russia. The population was 448 as of 2010. There are 8 streets.

== Geography ==
Verkhneyaushevo is located 7 km east of Fyodorovka (the district's administrative centre) by road. Gogolevka is the nearest rural locality.
