= Novosofiyevka =

Novosofiyevka Новософиевка
- Village
- Location within Bashkortostan Location within Russia
- Coordinates: 53°00′N 55°20′E
- Country: Russia
- Region: Bashkortostan
- District: Fyodorovsky District
- Time zone: UTC+5:00

Novosofiyevka (Russian: Новософиевка) is a rural locality (a village) in Bala-Chetyrmansky Selsoviet, Fyodorovsky District, Bashkortostan, Russia. The population was 198 as of 2010. There is 1 street.

== Geography ==
Novosofiyevka is located 34 km southeast of Fyodorovka (the district's administrative centre) by road. Sergeyevka is the nearest rural locality.
