= Zhulanikha =

Zhulanikha Жуланиха
- Village
- Location within Altai Krai Location within Russia
- Coordinates: 53°47′N 85°31′E
- Country: Russia
- Region: Altai Krai
- District: Zarinsky District
- Time zone: UTC+7:00

Zhulanikha (Russian: Жуланиха) is a rural locality (a selo) in Zarinsky District, Altai Krai, Russia. The population was 695 as of 2016. There are 12 streets.

== History ==
In 1921, anti-Bolshevik anarchist partisans under I. P. Novoselov were based at Zhulanikha, from where they took part in the peasant rebellion of Sorokino.

== Geography ==
Zhulanikha is located 62 km east of Zarinsk (the district's administrative centre) by road. Zyryanovka is the nearest rural locality.
