= Maganevka =

Maganevka Маганевка
- Village
- Location within Bashkortostan Location within Russia
- Coordinates: 53°13′N 55°20′E
- Country: Russia
- Region: Bashkortostan
- District: Fyodorovsky District
- Time zone: UTC+5:00

Maganevka (Russian: Маганевка) is a rural locality (a village) in Fyodorovsky Selsoviet, Fyodorovsky District, Bashkortostan, Russia. The population was 3 as of 2010. There is 1 street.

== Geography ==
Maganevka is located 18 km northeast of Fyodorovka (the district's administrative centre) by road. Gumbetovo is the nearest rural locality.
