= Gumbetovo =

Gumbetovo Гумбетово
- Village
- Location within Bashkortostan Location within Russia
- Coordinates: 53°11′N 55°23′E
- Country: Russia
- Region: Bashkortostan
- District: Fyodorovsky District
- Time zone: UTC+5:00

Gumbetovo (Russian: Гумбетово; Bashkir: Гөмбәт, Gömbät) is a rural locality (a village) in Verkhneyaushevsky Selsoviet, Fyodorovsky District, Bashkortostan, Russia. The population was 2 as of 2010. There is 1 street.

== Geography ==
Gumbetovo is located 18 km east of Fyodorovka (the district's administrative centre) by road. Maganevka is the nearest rural locality.
