= Guryevsky =

Guryevsky (masculine), Guryevskaya (feminine), or Guryevskoye (neuter) may refer to:

- Guryevsky District, several districts in Russia
- Guryevsky Urban Okrug, a municipal formation which Gureyevsky District of Kaliningrad Oblast, Russia is incorporated as
- Guryevskoye Urban Settlement, several municipal urban settlements in Russia
- Guryevsky (rural locality) (Guryevskaya, Guryevskoye), several rural localities in Russia
