= Afonino, Zarinsky District, Altai Krai =

Afonino Афонино
- Selo
- Location within Altai Krai Location within Russia
- Coordinates: 53°46′N 85°14′E
- Country: Russia
- Region: Altai Krai
- District: Zarinsky District
- Time zone: UTC+7:00

Afonino (Russian: Афонино) is a rural locality (a selo) in Novodrachyoninsky Selsoviet, Zarinsky District, Altai Krai, Russia. The population was 178 as of 2013. There are 5 streets.

== Geography ==
Afonino is located 44 km northeast of Zarinsk (the district's administrative centre) by road. Zmaznevo is the nearest rural locality.
