= Guryevsky District =

Location of Kaliningrad Oblast in Russia

Location of Kemerovo Oblast in Russia

Guryevsky District is the name of several administrative and municipal districts in Russia.

- Guryevsky District, Kaliningrad Oblast, an administrative district of Kaliningrad Oblast
- Guryevsky District, Kemerovo Oblast, an administrative and municipal district of Kemerovo Oblast

== See also ==
- Guryevsky (disambiguation)
