= Gavrilovka, Bala-Chetyrmansky Selsoviet, Fyodorovsky District, Republic of Bashkortostan =

Gavrilovka Гавриловка
- Selo
- Location within Bashkortostan Location within Russia
- Coordinates: 53°11′N 55°33′E
- Country: Russia
- Region: Bashkortostan
- District: Fyodorovsky District
- Time zone: UTC+5:00

Gavrilovka (Russian: Гавриловка) is a rural locality (a selo) in Bala-Chetyrmansky Selsoviet, Fyodorovsky District, Bashkortostan, Russia. The population was 240 as of 2010.

== Geography ==
Gavrilovka is located 39 km east of Fyodorovka (the district's administrative centre) by road.
