= Petrovka, Balyklinsky Selsoviet, Fyodorovsky District, Republic of Bashkortostan =

Petrovka Петровка
- Selo
- Location within Bashkortostan Location within Russia
- Coordinates: 53°07′N 55°20′E
- Country: Russia
- Region: Bashkortostan
- District: Fyodorovsky District
- Time zone: UTC+5:00

Petrovka (Russian: Петровка) is a rural locality (a selo) in Balyklinsky Selsoviet, Fyodorovsky District, Bashkortostan, Russia. The population was 32 as of 2010.

== Geography ==
It is located 12 km from Fyodorovka, 3 km from Balykly.
