= Gavrilovka, Fedorovsky Selsoviet, Fyodorovsky District, Republic of Bashkortostan =

Gavrilovka Гавриловка
- Village
- Location within Bashkortostan Location within Russia
- Coordinates: 53°08′N 55°13′E
- Country: Russia
- Region: Bashkortostan
- District: Fyodorovsky District
- Time zone: UTC+5:00

Gavrilovka (Russian: Гавриловка) is a rural locality (a village) in Fyodorovsky Selsoviet, Fyodorovsky District, Bashkortostan, Russia. The population was 21 as of 2010.

== Geography ==
Gavrilovka is located 39 km east of Fyodorovka (the district's administrative centre) by road. Verkhny Allaguvat is the nearest rural locality.
