= Petrovka, Dedovsky Selsoviet, Fyodorovsky District, Republic of Bashkortostan =

Petrovka Петровка
- Village
- Location within Bashkortostan Location within Russia
- Coordinates: 53°07′N 55°06′E
- Country: Russia
- Region: Bashkortostan
- District: Fyodorovsky District
- Time zone: UTC+5:00

Petrovka (Russian: Петровка) is a rural locality (a village) in Dedovsky Selsoviet, Fyodorovsky District, Bashkortostan, Russia. The population was 3 as of 2010.

== Geography ==
It is located 8 km from Fyodorovka.
