= Peasant rebellion of Sorokino =

Sorokino rebellion
- Part of the Russian Civil War and the Left-wing uprisings against the Bolsheviks
Date	Early 1921
Location	Altai Krai and Kuzbass, Russia
Result	Bolshevik victory

Belligerents
Alliance of peasant rebels, anarchists, and White Army veterans	Russian SFSR

Commanders and leaders
I. P. Novoselov; P. K. Lubkov; E. P. Listkov (Note: Even though Elistar Petrovič Listkov, a former Imperial Russian Army soldier and World War I veteran, reportedly served as rebel commander during the uprising, he was not put on trial until 1938, leaving the actual extent of his activity as insurgent unclear. In that year, he was convicted and executed in course of the NKVD Order No. 00447 purges.)	Unknown

Units involved
Several detachments	Red Army: 5th Army's 35th Division; 308th Regiment; ČON (Note: The Časti osobogo naznačeniâ (ČON) were paramilitary units that were organized by the RCP(b) to combat counter-revolutionary groups since 1919.)

Strength
5,000–10,000	Unknown

The peasant rebellion of Sorokino, officially called the Kulak Rebellion of Sorokino by the Soviet Russian authorities, was a popular uprising against the Soviet policy of war communism in Altai Krai and Kuzbass in central Russia.

== Prelude ==
After the Bolsheviks assumed control of the Russian government in the October Revolution of 1917, they implemented various policies which were unpopular among the country's rural population. As result, various anti-Communist peasant uprising erupted during the Russian Civil War. One of the largest and widespread rebellions took place in Siberia from mid-1920, after the Russian SFSR's tax policy had effectively destroyed the economic basis of many peasants. This revolt also affected the Altai Mountains, where the rebels were led by veteran anarchist partisans under I. P. Novoselov, P. K. Lubkov, and others. The Red Army managed to suppress this insurgency by fall 1920, and the revolting peasants were severely punished. Many anarchist insurgents including Novoselov and Lubkov managed to escape the government forces, however, and went into hiding.

== Rebellion ==
A new wave of uprisings hit the Altai region in January 1921. Similarly to the 1920 rebellion, it was motivated by opposition to the Communist tax policies. The peasants took up arms in order to force the communist government from their lands, and received support by rural rebels who had already taken part in the 1920 rebellion. The uprising spread across a "huge" area to the east of Barnaul and north of Biysk, where around 5,000–10,000 armed peasants rallied around the mottos "For a clean Soviet power" and "Soviets without communists". The center of the rebellion was the locality of Sorokino.

Supported by White Army veterans as well as anarchist partisans, the peasant rebels formed units, elected commanders and began to fight both the Red Army as well as local pro-government paramilitaries. The main rebel detachments were once again led by Lubkov and Novoselov; the latter was based at Zhulanikha and Julianikh. The fact that conservative Whites and anarchists allied during this rebellion showcased how desperate both groups had become in resisting the Red Army. Nevertheless, Novoselov planned to immediately turn on the Whites in the case of victory. In February 1921, a battalion of the 308th Regiment (5th Red Army's 35th Division) as well as several regiments of local paramilitaries defeated Novoselov's detachment near Sorokino. About 400 rebels as well as five Red Army soldiers were killed in this action. The rest of Novoselov's forces retreated towards Barnaul. The further course of the rebellion is not well documented, but the government eventually crushed the uprising, and went on to denounce the rebels as rich Kulaks and bandits.

== Aftermath ==
The history of the Sorokino rebellion eventually regained some importance when NKVD Order No. 00447 was implemented in 1937, as many former rebels were again put on trial and convicted, with those identified as insurgent commanders and former White Army officers mostly being executed.

In 1972, a monument was erected in Guryevsk for the five Red Army soldiers who had been killed at Sorokino during the rebellion. The monument includes a plaque with the inscription "To those who died for the cause of the proletariat eternal memory!"
