= Guryevsky District, Kemerovo Oblast =

Guryevsky District Гурьевский район (Russian)
- District
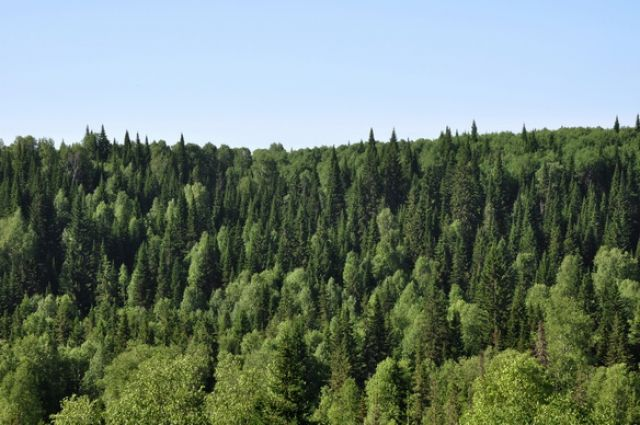
- Salairsky Nature Park, Guryevsky District

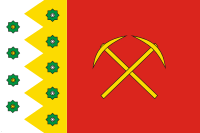
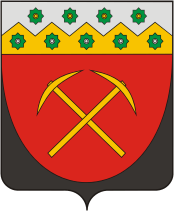
- Flag Coat of arms
- Location of Guryevsky District in Kemerovo Oblast
- Coordinates: 54°17′N 85°56′E
- Country: Russia
- Federal subject: Kemerovo Oblast
- Established: 1988
- Administrative center: Guryevsk

Area
  - Total: 2,180 km^{2} (840 sq mi)

Population (2010 Census)
  - Total: 10,617
  - Density: 4.87/km^{2} (12.6/sq mi)
  - Urban: 0%
  - Rural: 100%

Administrative structure
  - Administrative divisions: 7 rural territorie
  - Inhabited localities: 27 rural localities

Municipal structure
  - Municipally incorporated as: Guryevsky Municipal District
  - Municipal divisions: 2 urban settlements, 7 rural settlements
- Time zone: UTC+7 (MSK+4)
- OKTMO ID: 32602000
- Website: http://www.admgur.ru/

Guryevsky District (Russian: Гу́рьевский райо́н) is an administrative district (raion), one of the nineteen in Kemerovo Oblast, Russia. As a municipal division, it is incorporated as Guryevsky Municipal District. It is located in the west of the oblast and borders with Prokopyevsky, Belovsky, and Leninsk-Kuznetsky Districts of Kemerovo Oblast and with Altai Krai and Novosibirsk Oblast in the west. The area of the district is 2,180 square kilometers (840 sq mi). Its administrative center is the town of Guryevsk (which is not administratively a part of the district). Population: 10,617 (2010 census); 12,057 (2002 Census); 20,816 (1989 Soviet census).

== Geography ==
Gurevsky District is on the east slope of the Salair Ridge, and extension of the Altai mountains. It is on the west edge of the Kuznetsk Depression, site of the Kuznetsk Basin (the "Kuzbass" coal region), although the district itself is just off the main coal bearing ground. The district is 10 km west of the large town of Belovo, Kemerovo Oblast. The terrain is that of eroded plateau-type mountains and hills as the district follows the northwest-to-southeast orientation of the ridge. Vegetation is mountain forest and forest-steppe, with patches of forest scattered around the region.

The district is about 80 km north-to-south, and 50 km west-to-east, and surrounds the administratively-separate town of Guryevsk. It is located about 160 km south of the regional city of Kemerovo. Subdivisions of the district include 2 urban and 7 rural settlements. The climate of the district is humid continental (Koppen Dfb).

== Economy ==
The major industries of the district are metallurgy and timber. The district has explored reserves of copper-pyrites ores, and also produces and processes limestone and cement. The modern "Altai-Kuzbass" highway passes west–east through the middle of Guryevsky District.

== History ==
Tsar Alexander I established a silver mining complex in the district in 1816. After a dozen years the plant was converted to an iron works, which supplied tools and farm equipment to the region. The current district structure was established in 1988, having been a part of Belovsky District from 1963 to 1986.

== Administrative and municipal status ==
Within the framework of administrative divisions, Guryevsky District is one of the nineteen in the oblast. The town of Guryevsk serves as its administrative center, despite being incorporated separately as a town under oblast jurisdiction—an administrative unit with the status equal to that of the districts (and which, in addition to Guryevsk, also includes the town of Salair and two rural localities).

As a municipal division, the district is incorporated as Guryevsky Municipal District. The town of Guryevsk is incorporated within it as Guryevskoye Urban Settlement. The town of Salair and the two rural localities are incorporated within the municipal district as Salairskoye Urban Settlement.
