= Afonino, Vladimir Oblast =

Afonino Афонино
- Village
- Location within Vladimir Oblast Location within Russia
- Coordinates: 55°55′N 40°48′E
- Country: Russia
- Region: Vladimir Oblast
- District: Sudogodsky District
- Time zone: UTC+3:00

Afonino (Russian: Афонино) is a rural locality (a village) in Muromtsevskoye Rural Settlement, Sudogodsky District, Vladimir Oblast, Russia. The population was 31 as of 2010.

== Geography ==
Afonino is located on the Voyninga River, 5 km southwest of Sudogda (the district's administrative centre) by road. Raguzino is the nearest rural locality.
