= Sorokino, Starooskolsky District, Belgorod Oblast =

Sorokino Сорокино
- Selo
- Location within Belgorod Oblast Location within Russia
- Coordinates: 51°13′N 37°52′E
- Country: Russia
- Region: Belgorod Oblast
- District: Starooskolsky District
- Time zone: UTC+3:00

Sorokino (Russian: Сорокино) is a rural locality (a selo) in Starooskolsky District, Belgorod Oblast, Russia. The population was 582 as of 2010. There are 18 streets.

== Geography ==
Sorokino is located 10 km south of Stary Oskol (the district's administrative centre) by road. Nizhneatamanskoye is the nearest rural locality.
