= Sorokino, Kichmengsko-Gorodetsky District, Vologda Oblast =

Sorokino Сорокино
- Village
- Location within Vologda Oblast Location within Russia
- Coordinates: 60°01′N 45°47′E
- Country: Russia
- Region: Vologda Oblast
- District: Kichmengsko-Gorodetsky District
- Time zone: UTC+3:00

Sorokino (Russian: Сорокино) is a rural locality (a village) in Kichmegnskoye Rural Settlement, Kichmengsko-Gorodetsky District, Vologda Oblast, Russia. The population was 31 as of 2002.

== Geography ==
Sorokino is located 5 km north of Kichmengsky Gorodok (the district's administrative centre) by road. Kichmengsky Gorodok is the nearest rural locality.
