= Sorokino, Nikolsky District, Vologda Oblast =

Sorokino Сорокино
- Village
- Location within Vologda Oblast Location within Russia
- Coordinates: 59°27′N 45°52′E
- Country: Russia
- Region: Vologda Oblast
- District: Nikolsky District
- Time zone: UTC+3:00

Sorokino (Russian: Сорокино) is a rural locality (a village) in Zavrazhskoye Rural Settlement, Nikolsky District, Vologda Oblast, Russia. The population was 70 as of 2002.

== Geography ==
Sorokino is located 31 km southeast of Nikolsk (the district's administrative centre) by road. Starygino is the nearest rural locality.
