= Gavrilovka, Kugarchinsky District, Republic of Bashkortostan =

Gavrilovka Гавриловка
- Village
- Location within Bashkortostan Location within Russia
- Coordinates: 52°51′N 56°30′E
- Country: Russia
- Region: Bashkortostan
- District: Kugarchinsky District
- Time zone: UTC+5:00

Gavrilovka (Russian: Гавриловка) is a rural locality (a village) in Irtyubaksky Selsoviet, Kugarchinsky District, Bashkortostan, Russia. The population was 76 as of 2010. There are 2 streets.

== Geography ==
Gavrilovka is located 21 km north of Mrakovo (the district's administrative centre) by road. Tyulebayevo is the nearest rural locality.
