= Sorokino, Alexandrovsky District, Vladimir Oblast =

Sorokino Сорокино
- Village
- Location within Vladimir Oblast Location within Russia
- Coordinates: 56°21′N 38°47′E
- Country: Russia
- Region: Vladimir Oblast
- District: Alexandrovsky District
- Time zone: UTC+3:00

Sorokino (Russian: Сорокино) is a rural locality (a village) in Andreyevskoye Rural Settlement, Alexandrovsky District, Vladimir Oblast, Russia. The population was 22 as of 2010. There are 3 streets.

== Geography ==
Sorokino is located 7 km southeast of Alexandrov (the district's administrative centre) by road. Mayak is the nearest rural locality.
