= Guryevsky (rural locality) =

Guryevsky (Russian: Гурьевский; masculine), Guryevskaya (Гурьевская; feminine), or Guryevskoye (Гурьевское; neuter) is the name of several rural localities in Russia:

- Guryevskaya, Arkhangelsk Oblast, a village in Lyakhovsky Selsoviet of Krasnoborsky District of Arkhangelsk Oblast
- Guryevskaya, Vologda Oblast, a village in Nizhneslobodsky Selsoviet of Vozhegodsky District of Vologda Oblast
