= Salair (town) =

Salair Салаир
- Town
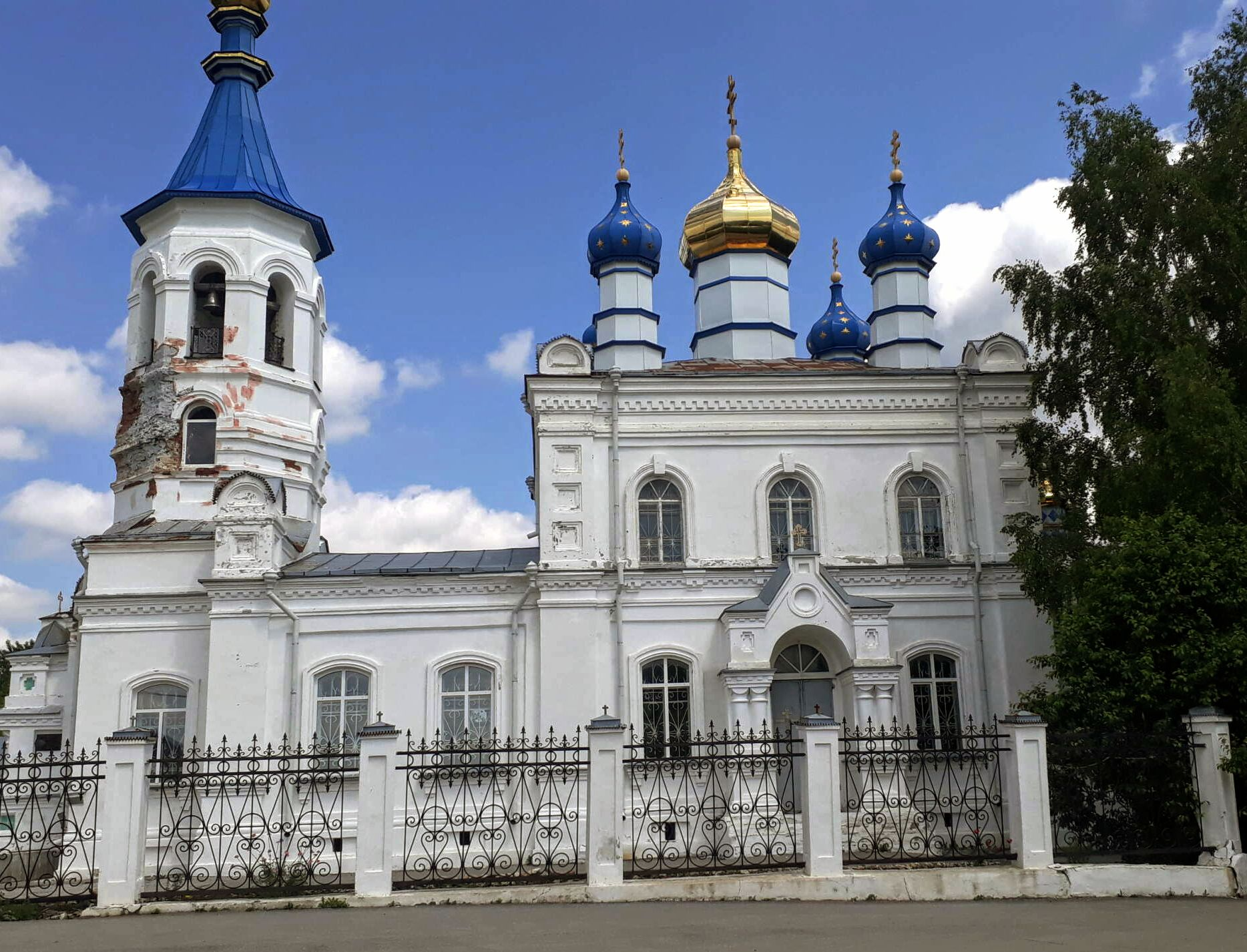

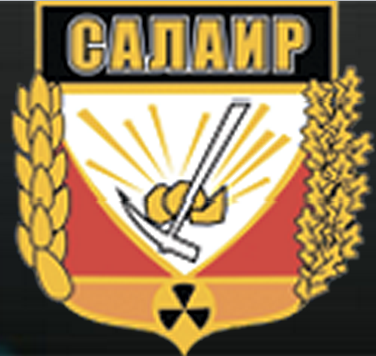
- Coat of arms
- Interactive map of Salair
- Location of Salair Salair (Kemerovo Oblast)
- Coordinates: 54°14′N 85°49′E
- Country: Russia
- Federal subject: Kemerovo Oblast
- Town of district significanceSelsoviet: Salair
- Founded: 1626
- Town status since: 1941
- Elevation: 330 m (1,080 ft)

Population (2010 Census)
  - Total: 8,262
  - Estimate (2025): 6,747 (−18.3%)

Administrative status
  - Subordinated to: Guryevsk Town Under Oblast Jurisdiction
  - Capital of: town of district significance of Salair

Municipal status
  - Municipal district: Guryevsky Municipal District
  - Urban settlement: Salairskoye Urban Settlement
  - Capital of: Salairskoye Urban Settlement
- Time zone: UTC+7 (MSK+4)
- Postal code: 652770
- OKTMO ID: 32602104001
- Website: xn----7sbabuvtn6af.xn--p1ai

Salair (Russian: Салаи́р) is a town administratively subordinated to Guryevsk Town Under Oblast Jurisdiction in Kemerovo Oblast, Russia, located 210 kilometers (130 mi) south of Kemerovo, the administrative center of the oblast. Population: 8,262 (2010 census); 9,472 (2002 census); 11,452 (1989 Soviet census).

== History ==
It was founded in 1626 as the village of Salairskoye (Салаирское) on the Malaya Tolmovaya River. Town status was granted to it in 1941.

== Administrative and municipal status ==
Within the framework of administrative divisions, it is, together with two rural localities, incorporated as the town of district significance of Salair, which is subordinated to Guryevsk Town Under Oblast Jurisdiction—an administrative unit with a status equal to that of the districts. As a municipal division, the town of district significance of Salair is incorporated within Guryevsky Municipal District as Salairskoye Urban Settlement.

== See also ==
- Salair Ridge
