= Guryevsk, Kemerovo Oblast =

Guryevsk Гурьевск
- Town
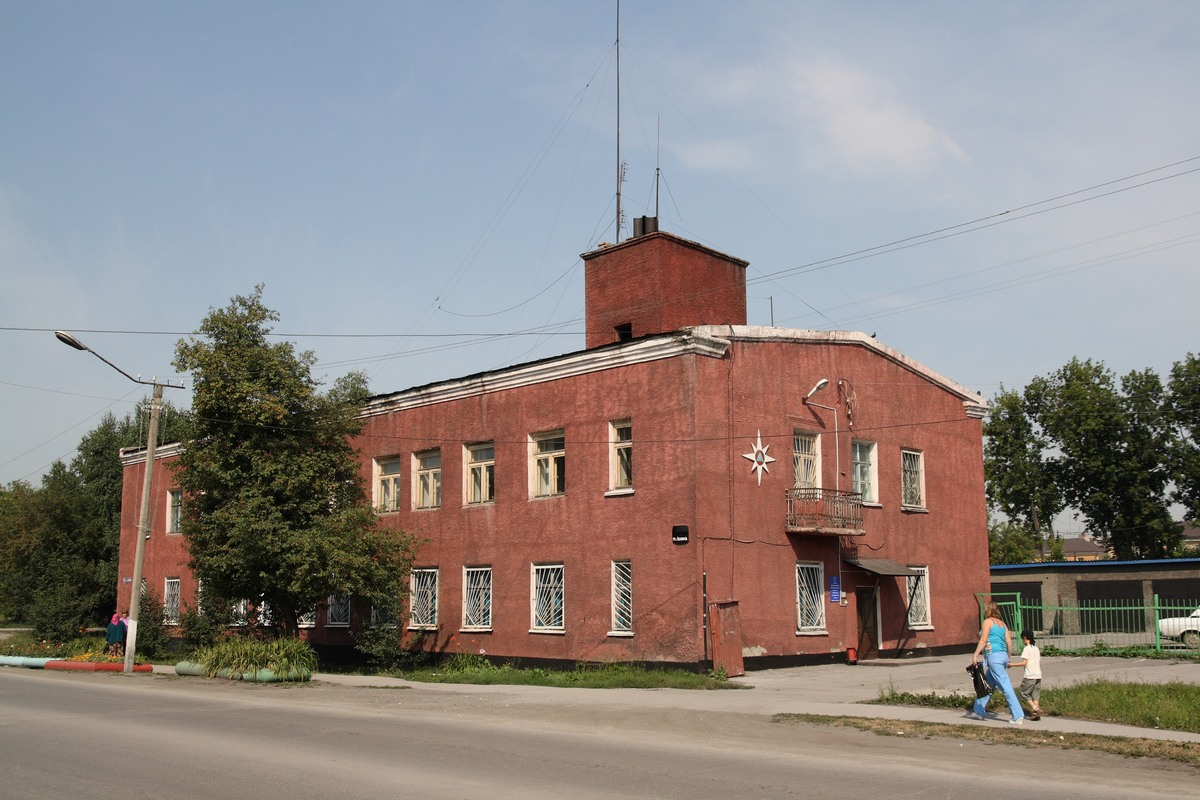
- Building in Guryevsk, Kemerovo Oblast

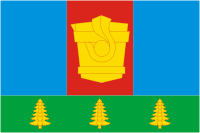
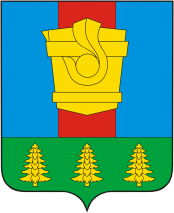
- Flag Coat of arms
- Interactive map of Guryevsk
- Location of Guryevsk Guryevsk (Kemerovo Oblast)
- Coordinates: 54°17′N 85°56′E
- Country: Russia
- Federal subject: Kemerovo Oblast
- Founded: 1815
- Town status since: 1938
- Elevation: 230 m (750 ft)

Population (2010 Census)
  - Total: 24,817
  - Estimate (2025): 21,487 (−13.4%)

Administrative status
  - Subordinated to: Guryevsk Town Under Oblast Jurisdiction
  - Capital of: Guryevsky District, Guryevsk Town Under Oblast Jurisdiction

Municipal status
  - Municipal district: Guryevsky Municipal District
  - Urban settlement: Guryevskoye Urban Settlement
  - Capital of: Guryevsky Municipal District, Guryevskoye Urban Settlement
- Time zone: UTC+7 (MSK+4)
- Postal codes: 652780, 652782, 652785
- OKTMO ID: 32602101001
- Website: www.admgurievsk.ru

Guryevsk (Russian: Гу́рьевск) is a town in Kemerovo Oblast, Russia, located 195 kilometers (121 mi) southeast of Kemerovo, the administrative center of the oblast. Population: 24,817 (2010 census); 27,381 (2002 census); 28,152 (1989 Soviet census).

== History ==
It was founded in 1815 and was granted town status in 1938.

== Administrative and municipal status ==
Within the framework of administrative divisions, Guryevsk serves as the administrative center of Guryevsky District, even though is not a part of it. As an administrative division, it is, together with one town (Salair) and two rural localities, incorporated separately as Guryevsk Town Under Oblast Jurisdiction—an administrative unit with a status equal to that of the districts. As a municipal division, the town of Guryevsk is incorporated within Guryevsky Municipal District as Guryevskoye Urban Settlement. The town of Salair and the two rural localities are incorporated within Guryevsky Municipal District as Salairskoye Urban Settlement.
