= Zarinsk =

Town in Altai Krai, Russia

Zarinsk Заринск
- Town
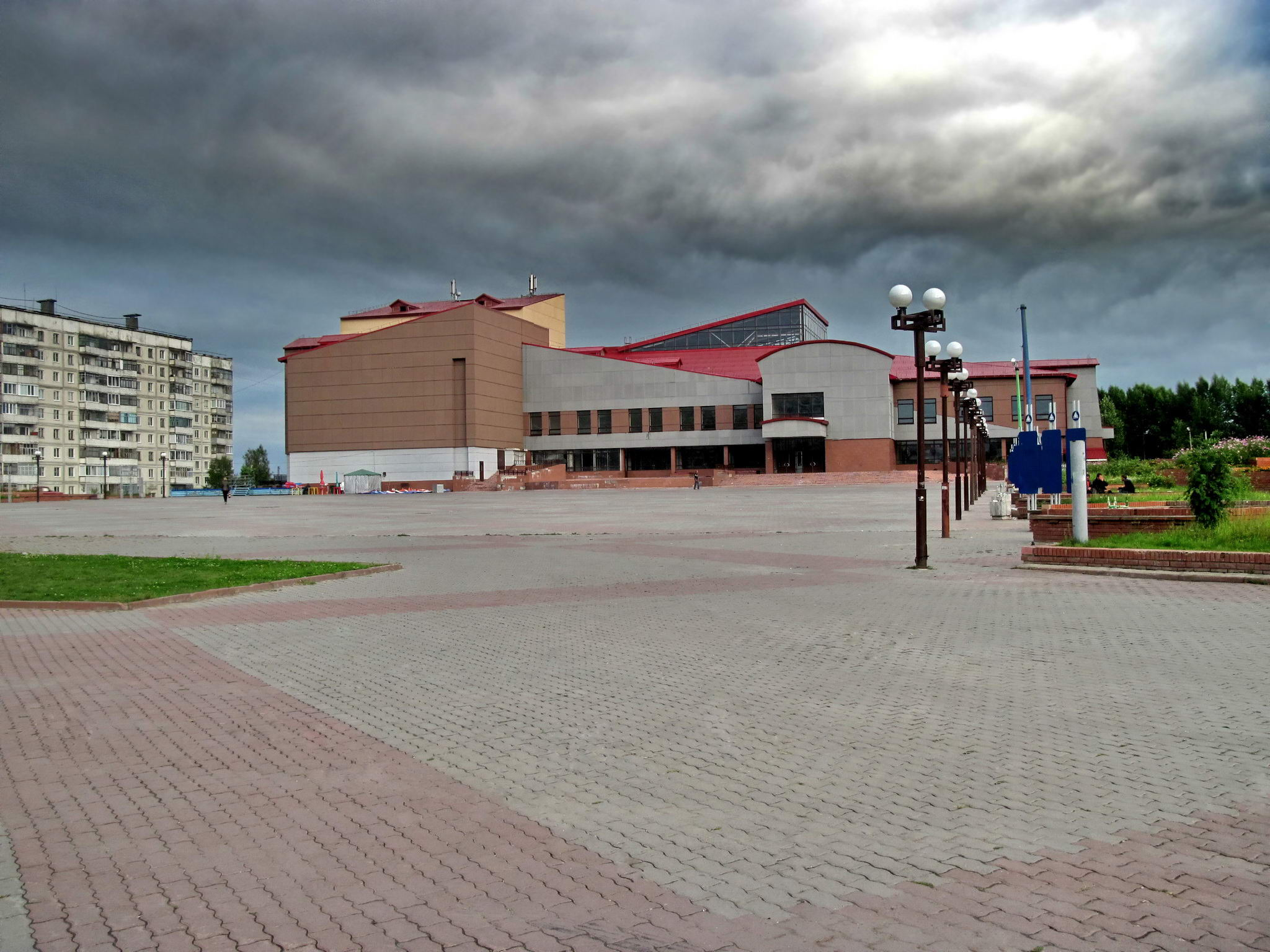
- Community centre in Zarinsk

- Coat of arms
- Interactive map of Zarinsk
- Location of Zarinsk Zarinsk (Altai Krai)
- Coordinates: 53°42′32″N 84°58′02″E
- Country: Russia
- Federal subject: Altai Krai
- Founded: 1952
- Town status since: 1979
- Elevation: 180 m (590 ft)

Population (2010 Census)
  - Total: 48,461
  - Estimate (2021): 41,272 (−14.8%)
  - Rank: 328th in 2010

Administrative status
  - Subordinated to: town of krai significance of Zarinsk
  - Capital of: town of krai significance of Zarinsk, Zarinsky District

Municipal status
  - Urban okrug: Zarinsk Urban Okrug
  - Capital of: Zarinsk Urban Okrug, Zarinsky Municipal District
- Time zone: UTC+7 (MSK+4)
- Postal code: 659100
- OKTMO ID: 01706000001

Zarinsk (Russian: Заринск) is a town in Altai Krai, Russia, located on the Chumysh River 99 kilometers (62 mi) east of Barnaul. Population: 48,461 (2010 census); 50,368 (2002 census); 50,235 (1989 Soviet census).

== History ==
The railway station of Zarinskaya (Заринская) was established in 1952. It was granted urban-type settlement status in 1958 and town status in 1979.

== Administrative and municipal status ==
Within the framework of administrative divisions, Zarinsk serves as the administrative center of Zarinsky District, even though it is not a part of it. As an administrative division, it is incorporated separately as the town of krai significance of Zarinsk—an administrative unit with the status equal to that of the districts. As a municipal division, the town of krai significance of Zarinsk is incorporated as Zarinsk Urban Okrug.

== Famous people ==
Krasilov Dmitry (Pukhlyash) - showman, dancer and actor.
