= Zarinsky District =

Zarinsky District Заринский район (Russian)
- District
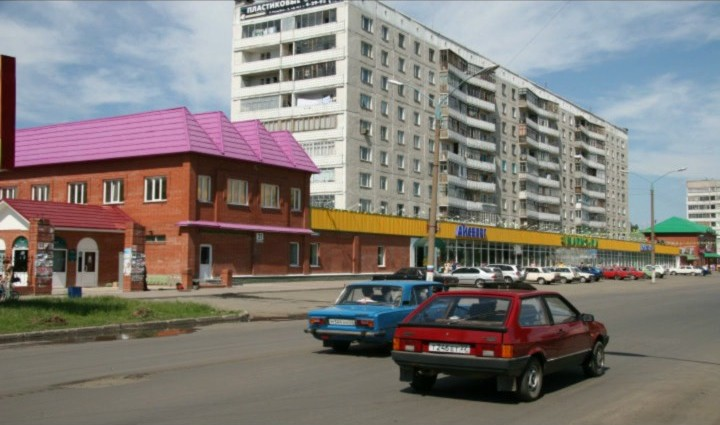

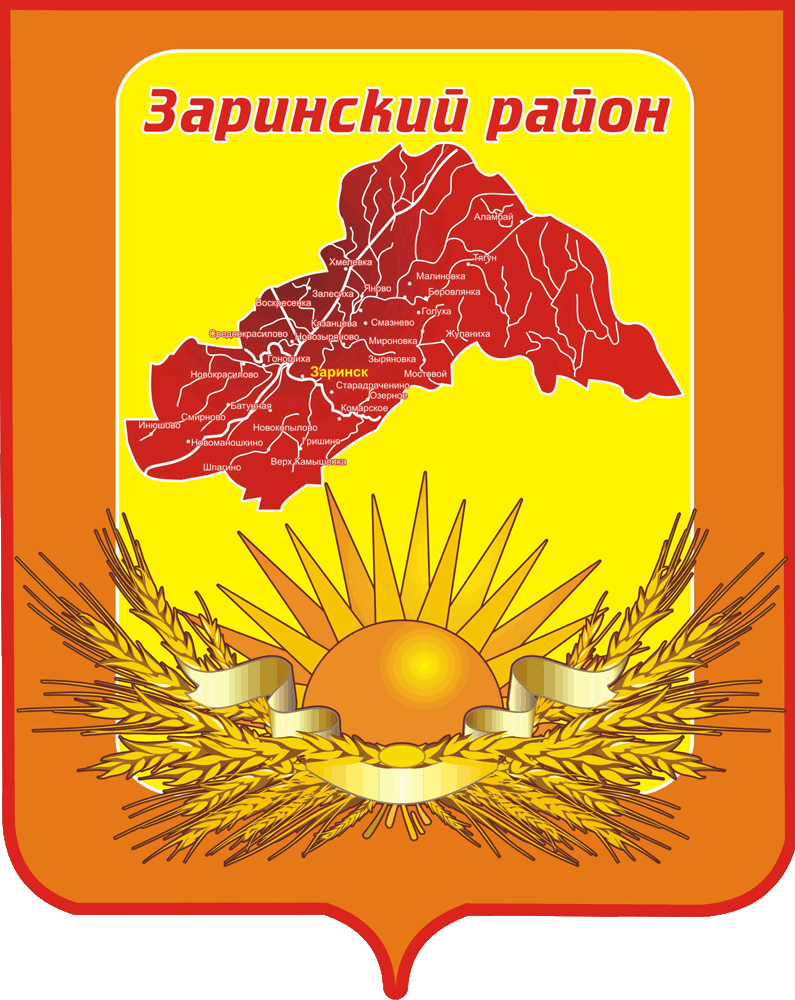
- Coat of arms
- Location of Zarinsky District in Altai Krai
- Coordinates: 53°42′N 84°54′E
- Country: Russia
- Federal subject: Altai Krai
- Established: 4 February 1924
- Administrative center: Zarinsk

Area
  - Total: 5,214 km^{2} (2,013 sq mi)

Population (2010 Census)
  - Total: 20,136
  - Density: 3.862/km^{2} (10.00/sq mi)
  - Urban: 0%
  - Rural: 100%

Administrative structure
  - Administrative divisions: 20 selsoviet
  - Inhabited localities: 50 rural localities

Municipal structure
  - Municipally incorporated as: Zarinsky Municipal District
  - Municipal divisions: 0 urban settlements, 20 rural settlements
- Time zone: UTC+7 (MSK+4)
- OKTMO ID: 01613000
- Website: www.altairegion22.ru

Zarinsky District (Russian: Зари́нский райо́н) is an administrative and municipal district (raion), one of the fifty-nine in Altai Krai, Russia. It is located in the northeast of the krai. The area of the district is 5,214 square kilometers (2,013 sq mi). Its administrative center is the town of Zarinsk (which is not administratively a part of the district). Population: 20,136 (2010 census); 22,026 (2002 census); 22,380 (1989 Soviet census).

== History ==
Until 1979, the district was called Sorokinsky (Сорокинский).

== Administrative and municipal status ==
Within the framework of administrative divisions, Zarinsky District is one of the fifty-nine in the krai. The town of Zarinsk serves as its administrative center, despite being incorporated separately as a town of krai significance—an administrative unit with the status equal to that of the districts.

As a municipal division, the district is incorporated as Zarinsky Municipal District. The town of krai significance of Zarinsk is incorporated separately from the district as Zarinsk Urban Okrug.
