= Fyodorovka, Fyodorovsky District, Republic of Bashkortostan =

Fyodorovka Фёдоровка
- Selo

Other transcription(s)
  - Bashkir: Фёдоровка
- Interactive map of Fyodorovka
- Location of Fyodorovka Fyodorovka (Bashkortostan)
- Coordinates: 53°10′43″N 55°11′09″E
- Country: Russia
- Federal subject: Bashkortostan
- Administrative district: Fyodorovsky District
- SelsovietSelsoviet: Fyodorovsky

Population (2010 Census)
  - Total: 4,306

Administrative status
  - Capital of: Fyodorovsky District, Fyodorovsky Selsoviet

Municipal status
  - Municipal district: Fyodorovsky Municipal District
  - Rural settlement: Fyodorovsky Selsoviet Rural Settlement
  - Capital of: Fyodorovsky Municipal District, Fyodorovsky Selsoviet Rural Settlement
- Time zone: UTC+5 (MSK+2)
- Postal code: 453280
- OKTMO ID: 80654460101

Fyodorovka (Russian: Фёдоровка, Bashkir: Фёдоровка, Fyodorovka) is a rural locality (a selo) and the administrative center of Fyodorovsky District in the Republic of Bashkortostan, Russia. Population: 4,306 (2010 census); 4,128 (2002 census); 3,923 (1989 Soviet census).
