= Fyodorovsky District, Bashkortostan =

Fyodorovsky District Фёдоровский район (Russian)
- District

Other transcription(s)
  - Bashkir: Фёдоровка районы
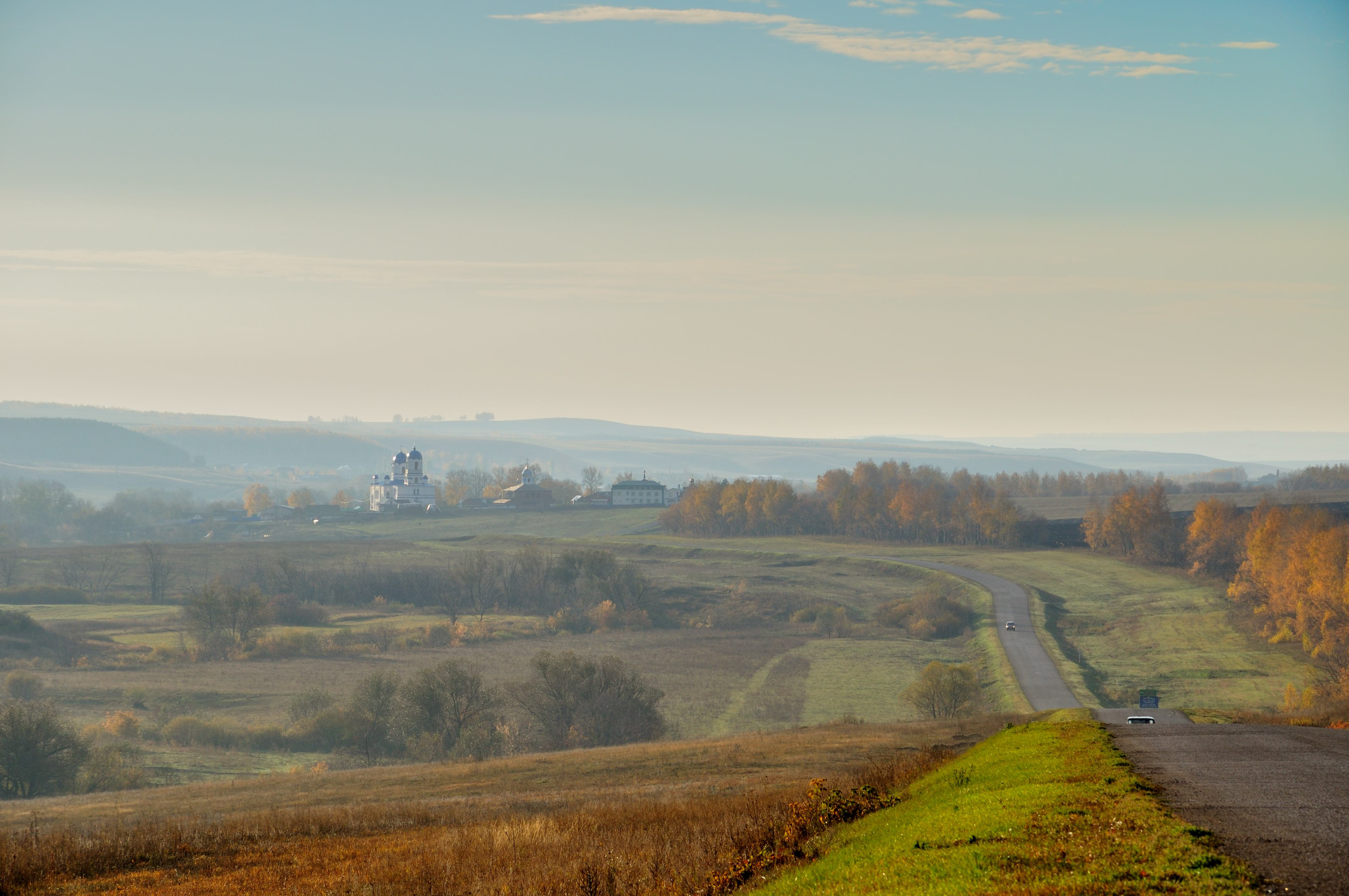
- Pokrovsky monastery in Dedovo, Fyodorovsky District

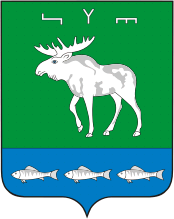
- Flag Coat of arms
- Location of Fyodorovsky District in the Republic of Bashkortostan
- Coordinates: 54°41′N 56°08′E
- Country: Russia
- Federal subject: Republic of Bashkortostan
- Established: 1935
- Administrative center: Fyodorovka

Area
  - Total: 1,693.24 km^{2} (653.76 sq mi)

Population (2010 Census)
  - Total: 18,650
  - Estimate (2018): 16,798 (−9.9%)
  - Density: 11.01/km^{2} (28.53/sq mi)
  - Urban: 0%
  - Rural: 100%

Administrative structure
  - Administrative divisions: 14 Selsoviets
  - Inhabited localities: 68 rural localities

Municipal structure
  - Municipally incorporated as: Fyodorovsky Municipal District
  - Municipal divisions: 0 urban settlements, 14 rural settlements
- Time zone: UTC+5 (MSK+2)
- OKTMO ID: 80654000
- Website: fedorovka.bashkortostan.ru

Population of Fyodorovsky District
- 2010 Census: 18,650
- 2002 Census: 19,675
- 1989 Census: 19,819
- 1979 Census: 23,197

Fyodorovsky District (Russian: Фёдоровский райо́н; Bashkir: Фёдоровка районы, Fyodorovka rayonı) is an administrative and municipal district (raion), one of the fifty-four in the Republic of Bashkortostan, Russia. It is located in the southwest of the republic and borders with Sterlibashevsky District in the north, Meleuzovsky District in the east, Kuyurgazinsky District in the south, and with Orenburg Oblast in the west. The area of the district is 1,693.24 square kilometers (653.76 sq mi). Its administrative center is the rural locality (a selo) of Fyodorovka. As of the 2010 Census, the total population of the district was 18,650, with the population of Fyodorovka accounting for 23.1% of that number.

== History ==
The district was established in 1935.

== Administrative and municipal status ==
Within the framework of administrative divisions, Fyodorovsky District is one of the fifty-four in the Republic of Bashkortostan. The district is divided into fourteen selsoviets, comprising sixty-eight rural localities. As a municipal division, the district is incorporated as Fyodorovsky Municipal District. Its fourteen selsoviets are incorporated as fourteen rural settlements within the municipal district. The selo of Fyodorovka serves as the administrative center of both the administrative and municipal district.
