= Peresheyechny =

Peresheyechny Перешеечный
- Settlement
- Location within Altai Krai Location within Russia
- Coordinates: 51°43′N 80°50′E
- Country: Russia
- Region: Altai Krai
- District: Yegoryevsky District
- Time zone: UTC+7:00

Peresheyechny (Russian: Перешеечный) is a rural locality (a settlement) in Lebyazhinsky Selsoviet, Yegoryevsky District, Altai Krai, Russia. The population was 639 as of 2013. There are 4 streets.

== Geography ==
Peresheyechny is located 9 km southwest of Novoyegoryevskoye (the district's administrative centre) by road. Lebyazhye is the nearest rural locality. Lakes Gorkoye and Gorkoye-Peresheyechnoye are located near the village.
