= Petukhov Log =

Petukhov Log Петухов Лог
- Settlement
- Location within Altai Krai Location within Russia
- Coordinates: 51°49′N 80°57′E
- Country: Russia
- Region: Altai Krai
- District: Yegoryevsky District
- Time zone: UTC+7:00

Petukhov Log (Russian: Петухов Лог) is a rural locality (a settlement) in Srostinsky Selsoviet, Yegoryevsky District, Altai Krai, Russia. The population was 115 as of 2013.

== Geography ==
Petukhov Log is located 11 km north of Novoyegoryevskoye (the district's administrative centre) by road. Srosty and Novoyegoryevskoye are the nearest rural localities. Lakes Gorkoye and Gorkoye-Peresheyechnoye are located near the village.
