= Lebyazhye, Yegoryevsky District, Altai Krai =

Lebyazhye Лебяжье
- Selo
- Location within Altai Krai Location within Russia
- Coordinates: 51°41′N 80°50′E
- Country: Russia
- Region: Altai Krai
- District: Yegoryevsky District
- Time zone: UTC+7:00

Lebyazhye (Russian: Лебяжье) is a rural locality (a selo) and the administrative center of Lebyazhinsky Selsoviet, Yegoryevsky District, Altai Krai, Russia. The population was 1,291 as of 2013. There are 8 streets.

== Geography ==
Lebyazhye is located 9 km south of Novoyegoryevskoye (the district's administrative centre) by road. Peresheyechny is the nearest rural locality. Lakes Gorkoye and Gorkoye-Peresheyechnoye are located near the village.
