= Nevodnoye =

Nevodnoye Неводное
- Village
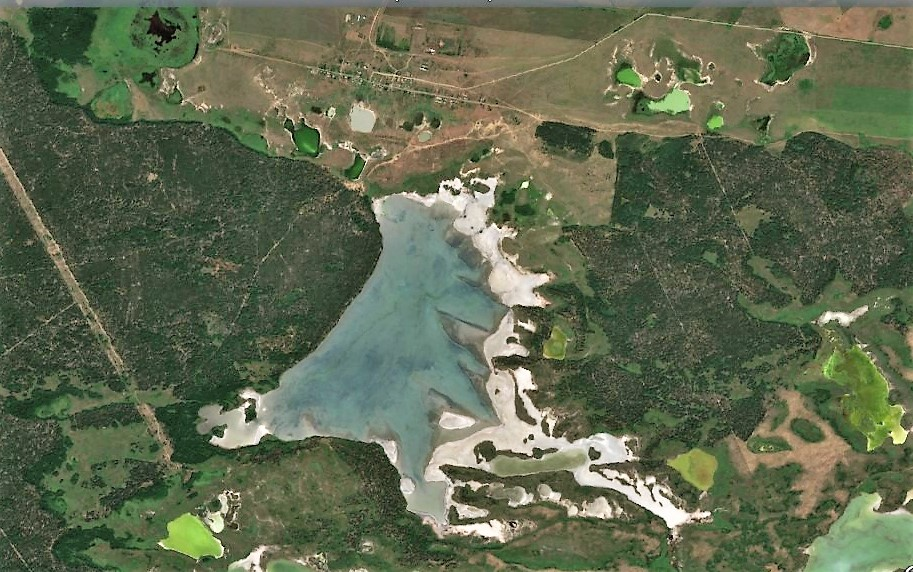
- Nevodnoye to the north of Gornostalevo lake Sentinel-2 image

- Location within Altai Krai Location within Russia
- Coordinates: 51°57′N 79°13′E
- Country: Russia
- Region: Altai Krai
- District: Mikhaylovsky District
- Village Council: Nikolayevsky Village Council

Population (2013)
  - Total: 212
- Time zone: UTC+7:00
- Postcode: 658974

Nevodnoye (Russian: Неводное) is a rural locality (a selo) in Nikolayevsky Village Council, Mikhaylovsky District, Altai Krai, Russia. Population: 229 (2010 census); 384 (2002 census); There are 4 streets.

== Geography ==
Nevodnoye lies in the Kulunda Steppe 1 kilometer (0.62 mi) to the north of lake Gornostalevo and close to the Russia-Kazakhstan border. It is located 43 kilometers (27 mi) northwest of Mikhaylovskoye (the district's administrative centre) by road. Irkutsky is the nearest rural locality.
