= Shubinka =

Shubinka Шубинка
- Village
- Location within Altai Krai Location within Russia
- Coordinates: 51°36′N 80°47′E
- Country: Russia
- Region: Altai Krai
- District: Yegoryevsky District
- Time zone: UTC+7:00

Shubinka (Russian: Шубинка) is a rural locality (a selo) and the administrative center of Shubinsky Selsoviet of Yegoryevsky District, Altai Krai, Russia. The population was 540 as of 2016. There are 6 streets.

== Geography ==
Shubinka is located 20 km south of Novoyegoryevskoye (the district's administrative centre) by road. Borisovka is the nearest rural locality. Lake Gorkoye is located near the village.
