= Srosty =

Srosty Сросты
- Selo
- Location within Altai Krai Location within Russia
- Coordinates: 51°53′N 81°00′E
- Country: Russia
- Region: Altai Krai
- District: Yegoryevsky District
- Time zone: UTC+7:00

Srosty (Russian: Сросты) is a rural locality (a selo) and the administrative center of Srostinsky Selsoviet, Yegoryevsky District, Altai Krai, Russia. The population was 1,948 as of 2013. There are 13 streets.

== Geography ==
Srosty is located 19 kilometers (12 mi) north of Novoyegoryevskoye (the district's administrative centre) by road. Zhernovtsy is the nearest rural locality. Lake Gorkoye-Peresheyechnoye lies 3 kilometers (1.9 mi) to the west.
