= Novosovetsky =

Novosovetsky Новосоветский
- Settlement
- Location within Altai Krai Location within Russia
- Coordinates: 51°49′N 80°38′E
- Country: Russia
- Region: Altai Krai
- District: Yegoryevsky District
- Time zone: UTC+7:00

Novosovetsky (Russian: Новосоветский) is a rural locality (a settlement) in Novoyegoryevsky Selsoviet, Yegoryevsky District, Altai Krai, Russia. The population was 24 as of 2013. There is 1 street.

== Geography ==
Novosovetsky is located on the Kormikha River, 22 km northwest of Novoyegoryevskoye (the district's administrative centre) by road. Rechka-Kormikha is the nearest rural locality.
