= Malaya Shelkovka =

Malaya Shelkovka Малая Шелковка
- Selo
- Location within Altai Krai Location within Russia
- Coordinates: 51°29′N 80°45′E
- Country: Russia
- Region: Altai Krai
- District: Yegoryevsky District
- Time zone: UTC+7:00

Malaya Shelkovka (Russian: Малая Шелковка) is a rural locality (a selo) and the administrative center of Maloshelkovnikovsky Selsoviet, Yegoryevsky District, Altai Krai, Russia. The population was 708 as of 2013. There are 7 streets.

== Geography ==
Malaya Shelkovka is located 33 km south of Novoyegoryevskoye (the district's administrative centre) by road. Borisovka is the nearest rural locality.
