= Pervomayskoye, Altai Krai =

Pervomayskoye Первомайское
- Selo
- Location within Altai Krai Location within Russia
- Coordinates: 51°44′N 81°11′E
- Country: Russia
- Region: Altai Krai
- District: Yegoryevsky District
- Time zone: UTC+7:00

Pervomayskoye (Russian: Первомайское) is a rural locality (a selo) and the administrative center of Pervomaysky Selsoviet of Yegoryevsky District, Altai Krai, Russia. The population was 836 as of 2014. There are 13 streets.

== Geography ==
Pervomayskoye is located 30 km east of Novoyegoryevskoye (the district's administrative centre) by road. Mirny is the nearest rural locality.
