= Irkutsky (rural locality) =

Irkutsky Иркутский
- Settlement
- Location within Altai Krai Location within Russia
- Coordinates: 51°57′N 79°22′E
- Country: Russia
- Region: Altai Krai
- District: Mikhaylovsky District
- Time zone: UTC+7:00

Irkutsky (Russian: Иркутский) is a rural locality (a settlement) in Nikolayevsky Selsoviet, Mikhaylovsky District, Altai Krai, Russia. The population was 22 as of 2013. There is 1 street.

== Geography ==
Irkutsky lies in the Kulunda Steppe 7 kilometers (4.3 mi) to the east of lake Gornostalevo, close to the Russia-Kazakhstan border. It is located 32 kilometers (20 mi) northwest of Mikhaylovskoye (the district's administrative centre) by road. Nikolayevka is the nearest rural locality.
