= Nikolayevka (selo), Nikolayevsky Selsoviet, Mikhaylovsky District, Altai Krai =

Nikolayevka Николаевка
- Selo
- Location within Altai Krai Location within Russia
- Coordinates: 51°55′N 79°24′E
- Country: Russia
- Region: Altai Krai
- District: Mikhaylovsky District
- Time zone: UTC+7:00

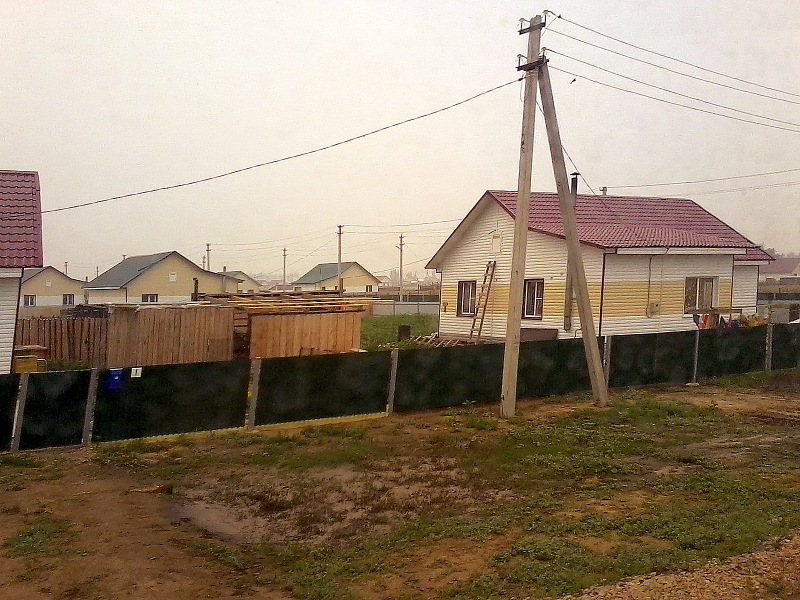
Nikolaevka village, 2012

Nikolayevka (Russian: Николаевка) is a rural locality (a selo) and the administrative center of Nikolayevsky Selsoviet, Mikhaylovsky District, Altai Krai, Russia. The population was 925 as of 2013. There are 9 streets.

== Geography ==
Nikolayevka lies in the Kulunda Steppe 11 kilometers (6.8 mi) to the east of lake Gornostalevo and close to the Russia-Kazakhstan border. It is located 27 kilometers (17 mi) northwest of Mikhaylovskoye (the district's administrative centre) by road. Bastan is the nearest rural locality.
