= Rakity =

Rakity (Russian: Ракиты) is the name of several rural localities in Russia:

- Rakity, Mikhaylovsky District, Altai Krai, a village in Mikhaylovsky District
- Rakity, Rubtsovsky District, Altai Krai, a village in Rubtsovsky District
