= Novoyegoryevsky =

Novoyegoryevsky (Russian: Новоего́рьевский; masculine), Novoyegoryevskaya (Новоего́рьевская; feminine), or Novoyegoryevskoye (Новоего́рьевское; neuter) is the name of several rural localities in Russia:

- Novoyegoryevskoye, Altai Krai, a selo in Yegoryevsky District of Altai Krai
- Novoyegoryevskoye, Nizhny Novgorod Oblast, a village in Knyagininsky District of Nizhny Novgorod Oblast
