= Rechka-Kormikha =

Rechka-Kormikha Речка-Кормиха
- Settlement
- Location within Altai Krai Location within Russia
- Coordinates: 51°49′N 80°36′E
- Country: Russia
- Region: Altai Krai
- District: Yegoryevsky District
- Time zone: UTC+7:00

Rechka-Kormikha (Russian: Речка-Кормиха) is a rural locality (a settlement) in Novoyegoryevsky Selsoviet, Yegoryevsky District, Altai Krai, Russia. The population was 7 as of 2013.

== Geography ==
Rechka-Kormikha is located on the Kormikha River, 24 km northwest of Novoyegoryevskoye (the district's administrative centre) by road. Novosovetsky is the nearest rural locality.
