= Kruglo-Sementsy =

Kruglo-Sementsy Кругло-Семенцы
- Selo
- Location within Altai Krai Location within Russia
- Coordinates: 51°32′N 80°53′E
- Country: Russia
- Region: Altai Krai
- District: Yegoryevsky District
- Time zone: UTC+7:00

Kruglo-Sementsy (Russian: Кругло-Семенцы) is a rural locality (a selo) and the administrative center of Kruglo-Sementsovsky Selsoviet, Yegoryevsky District, Altai Krai, Russia. The population was 368 as of 2013. There are 5 streets.

== Geography ==
Kruglo-Sementsy is located 58 km south of Novoyegoryevskoye (the district's administrative centre) by road. Borisovka is the nearest rural locality.
