= Bastan =

Bastan Бастан
- Village
- Location within Altai Krai Location within Russia
- Coordinates: 51°51′N 79°28′E
- Country: Russia
- Region: Altai Krai
- District: Mikhaylovsky District
- Time zone: UTC+7:00

Bastan (Russian: Бастан) is a rural locality (a selo) and the administrative center of Bastansky Selsoviet of Mikhaylovsky District, Altai Krai, Russia. The population was 903 in 2016. There are 8 streets.

== Geography ==
Bastan is located 19 km west of Mikhaylovskoye (the district's administrative centre) by road. Nikolayevka is the nearest rural locality.
