= Peschany Borok =

Peschany Borok Песчаный Борок
- Settlement
- Location within Altai Krai Location within Russia
- Coordinates: 51°38′N 81°03′E
- Country: Russia
- Region: Altai Krai
- District: Yegoryevsky District
- Time zone: UTC+7:00

Peschany Borok (Russian: Песчаный Борок) is a rural locality (a settlement) in Lebyazhinsky Selsoviet, Yegoryevsky District, Altai Krai, Russia. The population was 117 as of 2013. There is 1 street.

== Geography ==
Peschany Borok is located 18 km southeast of Novoyegoryevskoye (the district's administrative centre) by road. Sibir is the nearest rural locality.
