= Nina Usatova =

Soviet and Russian film and stage actress

- Нина Усатова
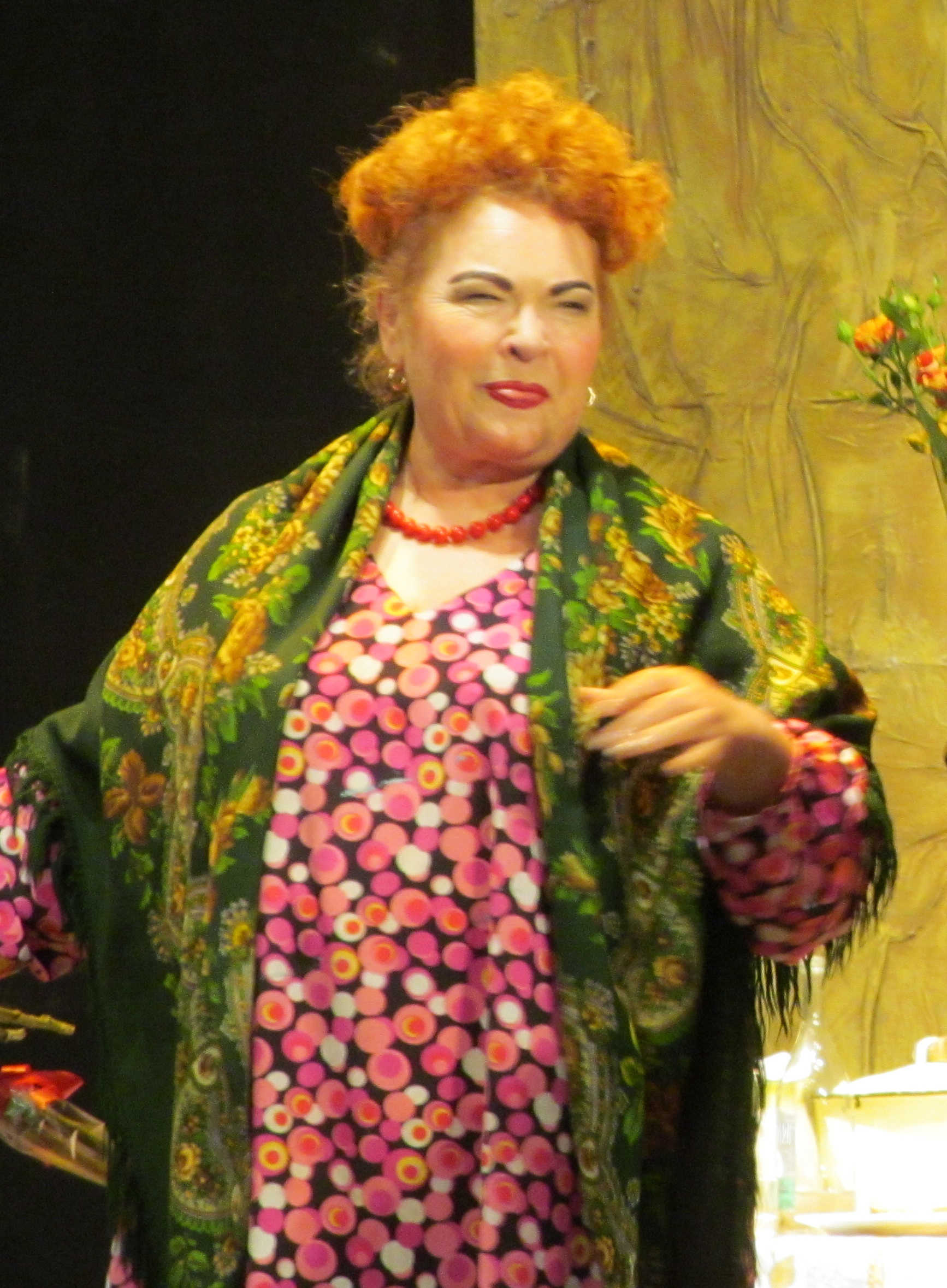
- Usatova performing at the Great Hall of Perm Philharmonic Society, 2015
- Born: October 1, 1951 (age 75); Malinovoye Ozero, Mikhaylovsky District, Altai Krai, Russian SFSR, Soviet Union
- Education: Boris Shchukin Theatre Institute
- Occupation: Actress
- Years active: 1979–present
Awards
Several others (see below)

Nina Nikolayevna Usatova (Russian: Нина Николаевна Усатова; born October 1, 1951) is a Soviet and Russian film and stage actress. People's Artist of Russia (1994).

== Biography ==
Nina Usatova was born on October 1, 1951, in the settlement at the station Malinovoye Ozero, Mikhaylovsky District, Altai Krai, Russian Soviet Federative Socialist Republic, Union of Soviet Socialist Republics, now the settlement at the station does not exist.

She graduated from high school number 30 in Kurgan.

From 1969 to 1973, she tried to enter the Boris Shchukin Theatre Institute at the Vakhtangov State Academic Theatre. Worked again at cloth factory Red October in Borovsk Kaluga region, as director for the House of Culture and was preparing for the entrance exams.

In 1974 she entered the directing faculty Boris Shchukin Theatre Institute (course Boris Zakhava and Marianna Ter-Zakharova), and graduated in 1979.

After finishing her studies in 1979, Nina went to practice in the city of Kotlas, Arkhangelsk Oblast. She played in the local theater twelve roles. At this time, opened in Leningrad Youth Theatre on the Fontanka, and in 1980, the aspiring actress went there. Played in the performances of Vladimir Malyshitsky and Efim Padve.

In 1989, Nina Usatova joined the troupe of the Leningrad Academic Bolshoi Drama Theater named after M. Gorky, now the Tovstonogov Bolshoi Drama Theater.

The actress made her film debut in 1981, her first role was in the TV movie Where did Fomenko?. Fame came after the role of the mute cook Lidiya Matveyevna in the film The Cold Summer of 1953 (1987).

In 1995, Nina Usatova participated in a series of television commercials under the general title of the Russian project. The actress played a provincial woman who arrived in Moscow and saw her son in the honor guard on Red Square. The phrase "Dima, wave your hand to mama" became popular.

== Personal life ==
Husband – Yuri Guryev, linguist and actor.

Son — Nikolay (born 1988).

== Honours and awards ==
- People's Artist of Russia (February 12, 1994) — for his great contribution in the field of theatrical art
- Honored Artist of the RSFSR (September 30, 1988)
- Order of Friendship (January 24, 2018)
- Medal of the Order "For Merit to the Fatherland" 2nd class (February 5, 2009) - for outstanding contribution to the development of domestic theatrical art and many years of fruitful activity '
- Medal of Pushkin (February 13, 2004)
- Laureate of the State Prize of the Russian Federation (2001)
- Nika Award in the nomination Best Actress (1995, 1999)
- Winner of the Juno (1996)
- Golden Eagle Award (Russia) in the category Best Actress (2013)
- The winner of the festival of actors movie Constellation (1992)
- Winner of the Golden Aries (1994)
- The winner of the festival of orthodox films Golden Knight (1995)
- The winner of the festival Kinotavr (1995)
- Winner of the IV All-Russian film festival Vivat, Russian Cinema (1998)

== Selected filmography ==
- 1981 — Where did Fomenko?
- 1982 — Golos
- 1984 — My Friend Ivan Lapshin
- 1985 — Feat of Odesa
- 1987 — Bayka
- 1987 — Proshchay, shpana zamoskvoretskaya...
- 1987 — The Cold Summer of 1953
- 1988 — Fountain
- 1990 — Under a Sky of Blue
- 1991 — Chicha
- 1991 — The Chekist
- 1992 — See Paris and Die
- 1993 — Window to Paris
- 1995 — Arrival of a Train
- 1995 — A Moslem
- 1995 — The Fatal Eggs
- 1996 — Russian project
- 1997 — American Bet
- 1999 — The Admirer
- 1999 — Women's Property
- 1999 — Quadrille
- 1999 — The Barracks
- 1999 — Strastnoy Boulevard
- 2001 — Next
- 2001 — Savage
- 2002 — Law
- 2002 — Beyond the wolves
- 2002 — Caucasian Roulette
- 2003 — Peculiarities of National Politics
- 2004 — Poor Nastya
- 2005 — The Twelve Chairs
- 2005 — The Fall of the Empire (TV)
- 2005 — The Case of "Dead Souls" (TV)
- 2005 — The Master and Margarita
- 2006 — Soviet Park
- 2006 — Last Slaughter
- 2006 — The Island
- 2006 — Wolfhound
- 2008 — Kings Can Do Everything
- 2009 — God's Smile or The Odesa Story
- 2009 — Soundtrack of Passion
- 2009 — Pelagia and the White Bulldog
- 2009 — The Priest
- 2010 — Widow steamer
- 2011 — Furtseva
- 2013 — Legend № 17
- 2013 — The village
- 2016 — Flight Crew
- 2021-2023 — Sklifosovsky
