= Dolino =

Dolino Долино
- Settlement
- Location within Altai Krai Location within Russia
- Coordinates: 51°29′N 80°54′E
- Country: Russia
- Region: Altai Krai
- District: Yegoryevsky District
- Time zone: UTC+7:00

Dolino (Russian: Долино) is a rural locality (a settlement) in Maloshelkovnikovsky Selsoviet, Yegoryevsky District, Altai Krai, Russia. The population was 39 as of 2013.

== Geography ==
Dolino is located 55 km south of Novoyegoryevskoye (the district's administrative centre) by road. Kruglo-Sementsy is the nearest rural locality.
