= Poluyamki =

Poluyamki Полуямки
- Village
- Location within Altai Krai Location within Russia
- Coordinates: 52°04′N 79°41′E
- Country: Russia
- Region: Altai Krai
- District: Mikhaylovsky District
- Time zone: UTC+7:00

Poluyamki (Russian: Полуямки) is a rural locality (a selo) and the administrative center of Poluyamsky Selsoviet of Mikhaylovsky District, Altai Krai, Russia. The population was 841 in 2016. There are 13 streets.

== Geography ==
Poluyamki is located 32 km north of Mikhaylovskoye (the district's administrative centre) by road. Nazarovka is the nearest rural locality.
