= Rakity, Mikhaylovsky District, Altai Krai =

Rakity Ракиты
- Village
- Location within Altai Krai Location within Russia
- Coordinates: 51°50′N 79°53′E
- Country: Russia
- Region: Altai Krai
- District: Mikhaylovsky District
- Time zone: UTC+7:00

Rakity (Russian: Ракиты) is a rural locality (a selo) and the administrative center of Rakitovsky Selsoviet, located in Mikhaylovsky District, Altai Krai, Russia. As of 2016, its population was 2,185. The locality contains 15 streets.

== Geography ==
Rakity is located 13 km east of Mikhaylovskoye, the administrative center of the district, by road. Mikhaylovskoye is also the nearest rural locality.
