= Irkutsky =

Irkutsky (masculine), Irkutskaya (feminine), or Irkutskoye (neuter) may refer to:

- Irkutsky District, a district of Irkutsk Oblast, Russia
- Irkutsky (inhabited locality) (Irkutskaya, Irkutskoye), name of several rural localities in Russia
- Irkutsk Oblast (Irkutskaya Oblast), a federal subject of Russia
