= Titovka =

Titovka may refer to:

- Titovka (river), a river in Murmansk Oblast, Russia
- Titovka (rural locality), name of several rural localities in Russia
- Titovka (cap), a Yugoslav side cap
