= Titovka (rural locality) =

Titovka (Russian: Титовка) is the name of several rural localities in Russia:

- Titovka, Altai Krai, a selo in Titovsky Selsoviet of Yegoryevsky District of Altai Krai
- Titovka, Belgorod Oblast, a selo in Shebekinsky District of Belgorod Oblast
- Titovka, Bryansky District, Bryansk Oblast, a village in Glinishchevsky Selsoviet of Bryansky District of Bryansk Oblast
- Titovka, Kletnyansky District, Bryansk Oblast, a village in Semirichsky Selsoviet of Kletnyansky District of Bryansk Oblast
- Titovka, Pochepsky District, Bryansk Oblast, a selo in Titovsky Selsoviet of Pochepsky District of Bryansk Oblast
- Titovka, Zhukovsky District, Bryansk Oblast, a village in Olsufyevsky Selsoviet of Zhukovsky District of Bryansk Oblast
- Titovka, Murmansk Oblast, a railway station in Korzunovsky Territorial Okrug of Pechengsky District of Murmansk Oblast
- Titovka, Orenburg Oblast, a selo in Titovsky Selsoviet of Sharlyksky District of Orenburg Oblast
- Titovka, Rostov Oblast, a sloboda in Titovskoye Rural Settlement of Millerovsky District of Rostov Oblast
- Titovka, Samara Oblast, a village in Koshkinsky District of Samara Oblast
- Titovka, Smolensk Oblast, a village in Studenetskoye Rural Settlement of Shumyachsky District of Smolensk Oblast
- Titovka, Tambov Oblast, a selo in Degtyansky Selsoviet of Sosnovsky District of Tambov Oblast
- Titovka, Kamensky District, Tula Oblast, a village in Kadnovsky Rural Okrug of Kamensky District of Tula Oblast
- Titovka, Tyoplo-Ogaryovsky District, Tula Oblast, a village in Bolshe-Ogarevsky Rural Okrug of Tyoplo-Ogaryovsky District of Tula Oblast
