= Titovka, Altai Krai =

Titovka Титовка
- Village
- Location within Altai Krai Location within Russia
- Coordinates: 52°00′N 81°09′E
- Country: Russia
- Region: Altai Krai
- District: Yegoryevsky District
- Time zone: UTC+7:00

Titovka (Russian: Титовка) is a rural locality (a selo) and the administrative center of Titovsky Selsoviet of Yegoryevsky District, Altai Krai, Russia. The population was 933 as of 2016. There are 11 streets.

== Geography ==
Titovka is located 38 km north of Novoyegoryevskoye (the district's administrative centre) by road. Tokaryovo is the nearest rural locality.
