= Irkutsky (inhabited locality) =

Irkutsky (Russian: Ирку́тский; masculine), Irkutskaya (Ирку́тская; feminine), or Irkutskoye (Ирку́тское; neuter) is the name of several rural localities in Russia:

- Irkutsky (rural locality), a settlement in Nikolayevsky Selsoviet of Mikhaylovsky District of Altai Krai
- Irkutskoye, Kaliningrad Oblast, a settlement in Kovrovsky Rural Okrug of Zelenogradsky District of Kaliningrad Oblast
- Irkutskoye, Krasnoyarsk Krai, a selo in Minderlinsky Selsoviet of Sukhobuzimsky District of Krasnoyarsk Krai
