= Chicha (film) =

- Russian: Чича
- Directed by: Vitaly Melnikov
- Written by: Vladimir Vardunas
- Starring: Mikhail Dorofeev; Nina Usatova; Boryslav Brondukov; Sergey Sazontev; Mikhail Kabatov
- Cinematography: Valeri Myulgaut
- Edited by: Raisa Lisova
- Music by: Vadim Bibergan
- Release date: 1991
- Running time: 89 minute
- Country: Soviet Union
- Language: Russian

Chicha (Russian: Чича) is a 1991 Soviet comedy film directed by Vitaly Melnikov.

The film tells about a kind artist who throughout his life sang in a strange voice.

== Plot ==
Stepan "Chicha" Chichulin, a tenor in a provincial military choir, surprises a crowd of angry protesters by unleashing a powerful bass voice while attempting to escape them during a rally. Secretly training to sing in this deeper register, Chicha has kept his unique skill under wraps, practicing at a secure location. However, his impressive bass talent does not stay hidden for long, and soon the choir's artistic director dismisses him, believing such a voice deserves a larger stage. Chicha's wife takes action, heading to Moscow to find an opportunity worthy of his newly revealed voice. While she is away, Chicha decides to perform at a local market, initially with his classical repertoire. A former choir colleague, who has been busking at the market, suggests they collaborate. Adapting his style to appeal to the local crowd, Chicha begins singing simpler tunes inspired by popular performers like Willy Tokarev, yet insists on singing in bass. He even abandons a position in a church choir, embracing his new venture.

As Chicha and his partner achieve financial success, he performs at restaurants, imitating artists like Adriano Celentano, and gradually drifts from his "bass-only" commitment. In a turn of events, Chicha is forced to sing in a high-pitched voice to entertain a notorious mobster, now immobilized and encased in plaster at a hospital, by performing songs from the band Laskovy May. Upon her return from Moscow, Chicha's wife reveals that the recordings of his bass performances have garnered interest from a small experimental opera theater. With renewed hope, the couple hastily prepares to move to Moscow to pursue his big break. However, as they make their way, it becomes clear that Chicha has lost his voice, dashing their aspirations just as they are within reach.

== Cast ==
- Mikhail Dorofeev
- Nina Usatova
- Boryslav Brondukov
- Sergey Sazontev
- Mikhail Kabatov
- Valeriya Mulakevich
- Ivan Smirnov
- Viktor Bychkov
- Viktor Bortsov
- Aleksandr Kovalyov
