= Gornostalevo =

Salt lake in Altai Krai, Russia

- Горносталево
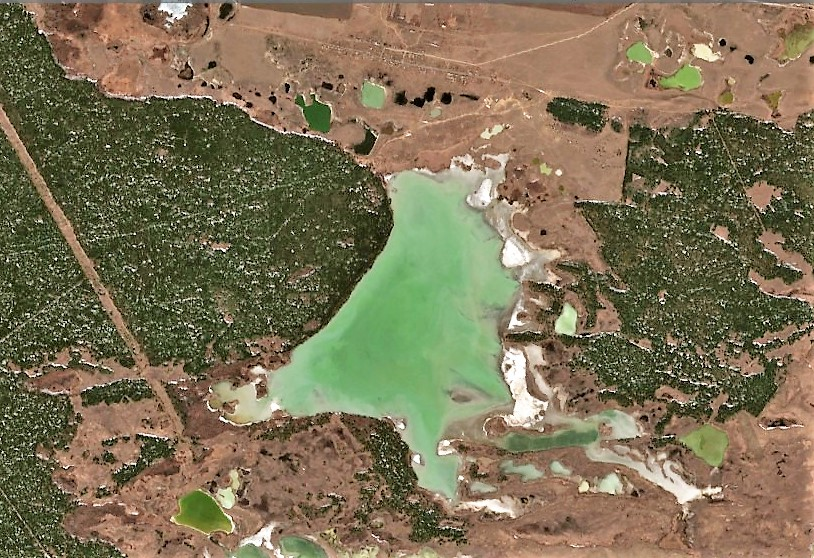
- Sentinel-2 image of the lake and its surroundings

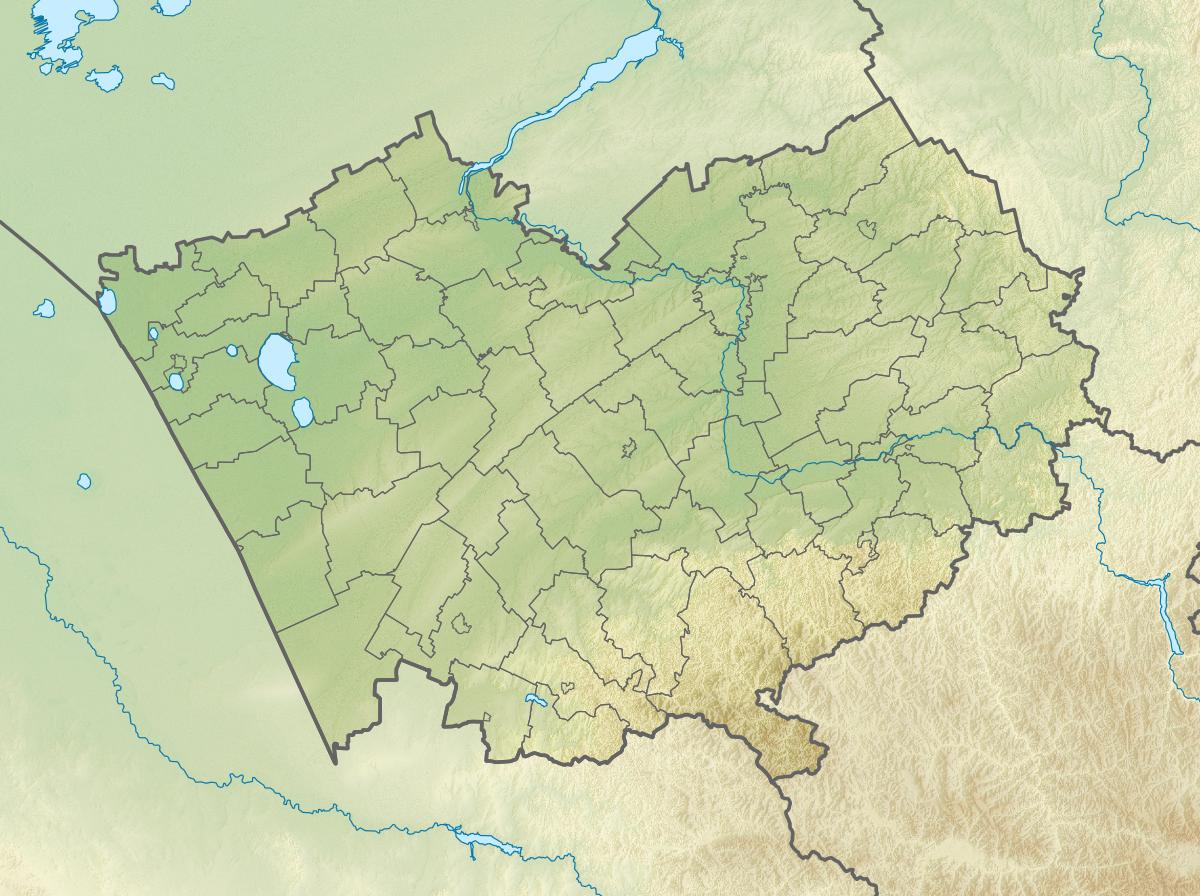
- Location within Altai Krai Location within Russia
- Location: Kulunda Steppe; West Siberian Plain
- Coordinates: 51°55′50″N 79°13′49″E
- Type: endorheic
- Basin countries: Russia
- Max. length: 4.4 kilometers (2.7 mi)
- Max. width: 2.9 kilometers (1.8 mi)
- Surface area: 8.7 square kilometers (3.4 sq mi)
- Residence time: UTC+6
- Surface elevation: 139 meters (456 ft)
- Settlements: Nevodnoye

Gornostalevo (Russian: Горносталево), also known as Gornostalevoye (Russian: Горносталевое), is a salt lake in Mikhaylovsky District, Altai Krai, Russian Federation.

The lake is located at the western edge of the Krai. The nearest inhabited place is Nevodnoye, 1 kilometer (0.62 mi) to the north of the northern end. Mikhaylovskoye, the district capital, lies 33 kilometers (21 mi) to the ESE.

== History ==
Salt from the lake has been extracted on a small scale since 1772. The mud of Gornostalevo has been used by local people for medicinal purposes since old times. The lake first appeared on a map in 1830.

Gornostalevo was finally surveyed by Irkutsk University scholar Klavdiy Nikolaevich Mirotvortsev (1880—1950) during his 1911 exploration of the Kulunda Steppe lakes on behalf of V.P. Mikhailov, the head of the Altai Mining District. The results of the survey were published in the document “Salt Lakes and Salt Industry in the Altai District”. About Gornostalevo Mirotvortsev observed:

“Lake Gornostalevo is located near Nevodnaya, 35 miles from the Borovoye Lakes. The soil on the shore is sandy, and in the lake itself it is silty and thin. The salt is of good quality...”

== Geography ==
Located in the Kulunda Plain, Gornostalevo has a roughly triangular shape, stretching roughly from north to south for approximately 6 kilometers (3.7 mi).The southwestern corner of the lake is only 500 meters (1,600 ft) to the east of the Russia-Kazakhstan border. The water is saline with a 99.693% of sodium chloride, 0.195% of sodium sulphate, and 0.0005% of magnesium sulphate.

Lake Petukhovskoye lies 17 kilometers (11 mi) to the north, pink lake Malinovoye 40 kilometers (25 mi) to the southeast, Dunay 18 kilometers (11 mi) to the ENE, Kurichye 29 kilometers (18 mi) to the NNE and Bargana 23 kilometers (14 mi) to the southwest, beyond the border in Kazakhstan.

== Flora and fauna ==
The lake is surrounded by forest steppe. Artemia salina crustaceans inhabit the waters of lake Gornostalevo. These are harvested and sold by locals.

== See also ==
- List of lakes of Russia
