= Malinovoye Ozero =

Malinovoye Ozero Малиновое Озеро
- Urban-type settlement
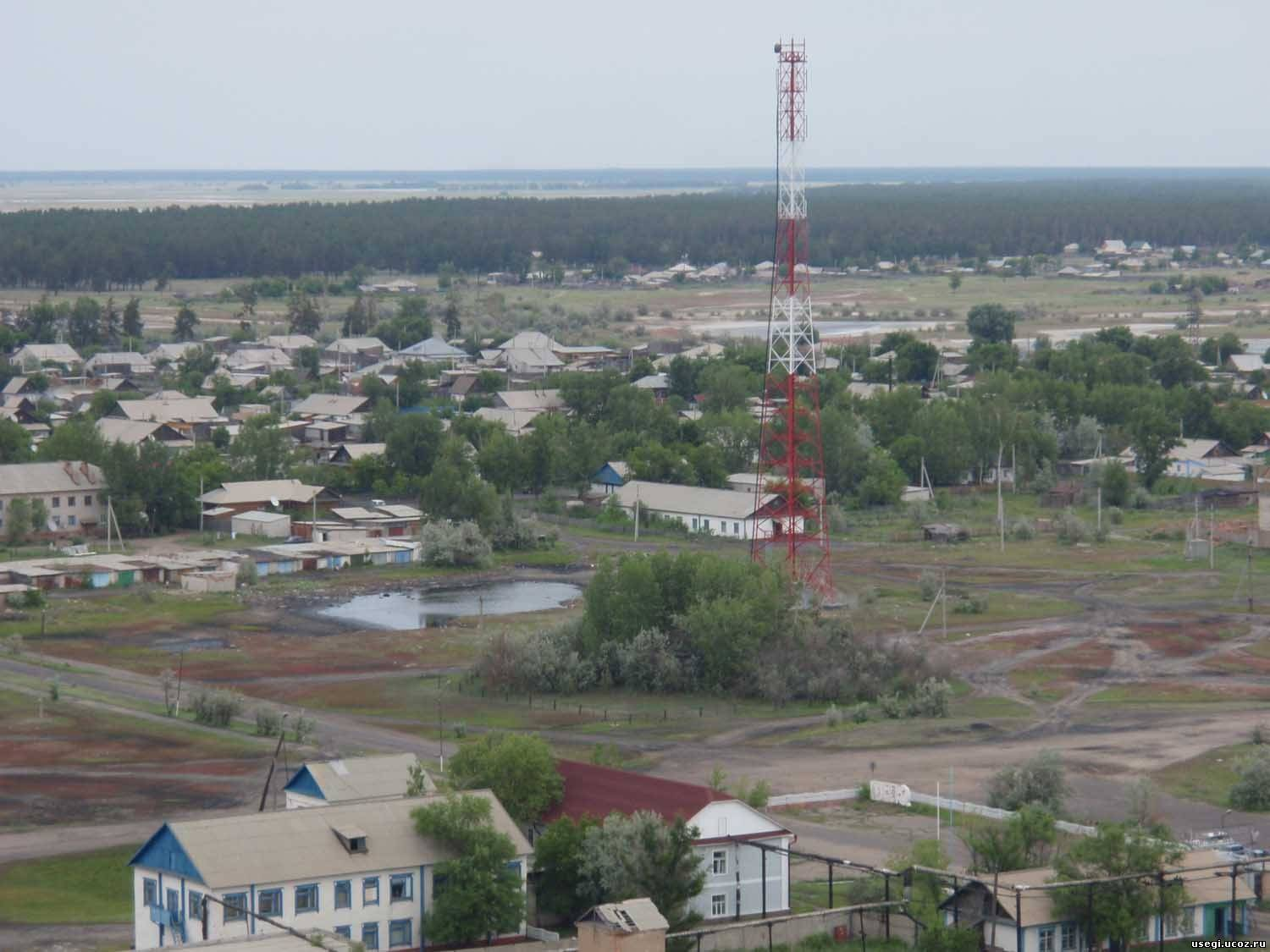
- Interactive map of Malinovoye Ozero
- Location of Malinovoye Ozero Malinovoye Ozero (Altai Krai)
- Coordinates: 51°40′28″N 79°46′46″E
- Country: Russia
- Federal subject: Altai Krai
- Administrative district: Mikhaylovsky District
- Founded: 1942

Population (2010 Census)
  - Total: 3,586
  - Estimate (2025): 2,552 (−28.8%)

Municipal status
  - Municipal district: Mikhaylovsky Municipal District
  - Urban settlement: Malinovoozyorsky Possovet Urban Settlement
  - Capital of: Malinovoozyorsky Possovet Urban Settlement
- Time zone: UTC+7 (MSK+4)
- Postal code: 658969
- OKTMO ID: 01627154051

Malinovoye Ozero (Russian: Малиновое Озеро) is an urban locality (urban-type settlement) in Mikhaylovsky District of Altai Krai, Russia. Population: 3,586 (2010 census); 4,133 (2002 census); 5,009 (1989 Soviet census).

== Geography ==
Pink lake Malinovoye is located to the north of the settlement.
