= Last Slaughter =

Last Mine-Face
- Russian: Последний забой
- Directed by: Sergey Bobrov
- Written by: Yuriy Korotkov; Valery Todorovsky
- Produced by: Valery Todorovsky
- Starring: Sergey Garmash; Nina Usatova; Pyotr Zaychenko; Tatyana Shkrabak; Artur Smolyaninov
- Music by: Sergey Bobrov; Siarhei Mikhalok
- Release date: 2006
- Country: Russia
- Language: Russian

Last Mine-Face (Russian: Последний забой) is a 2006 Russian drama film directed by Sergey Bobrov.

== Plot ==
In the center of the plot are three miners of different generations who do not have enough money to feed their families, as a result of which they undermine themselves in the mine, expecting a generous death insurance payment for their families and dependents.

== Cast ==
- Sergey Garmash as Sergei Nikolayevich
- Nina Usatova as Galya
- Pyotr Zaychenko as Anatoli Ivanovich, 'Grandpa'
- Tatyana Shkrabak as 'Grandpa's wife
- Artur Smolyaninov as Andryukha
- Yuliya Snigir as Anzhela (as Yuliya Snigir)
- Aleksey Gorbunov as Yefim Ilyich
- Olga Khokhlova as Anzhela's mother
- Tatyana Lyutaeva
- Natalya Naumova
- Oksana Polovina
