= Malinovoye (lake) =

Salt lake in Altai Krai, Russia

- Малиновое
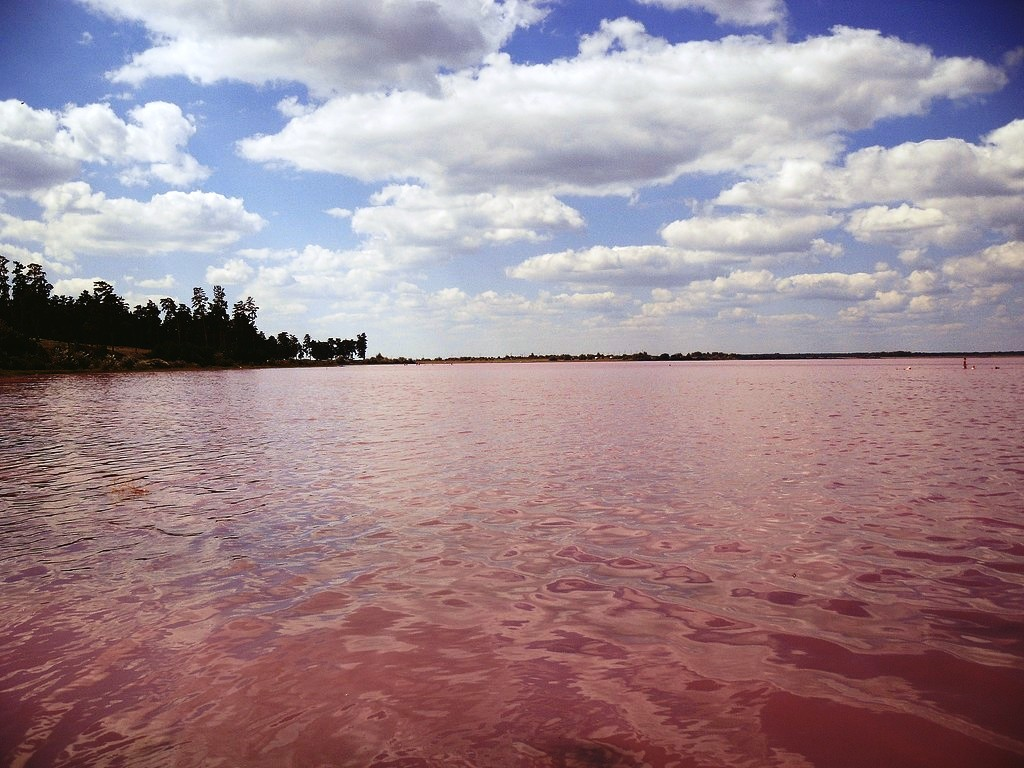
- Panorama of the lake and its pink waters

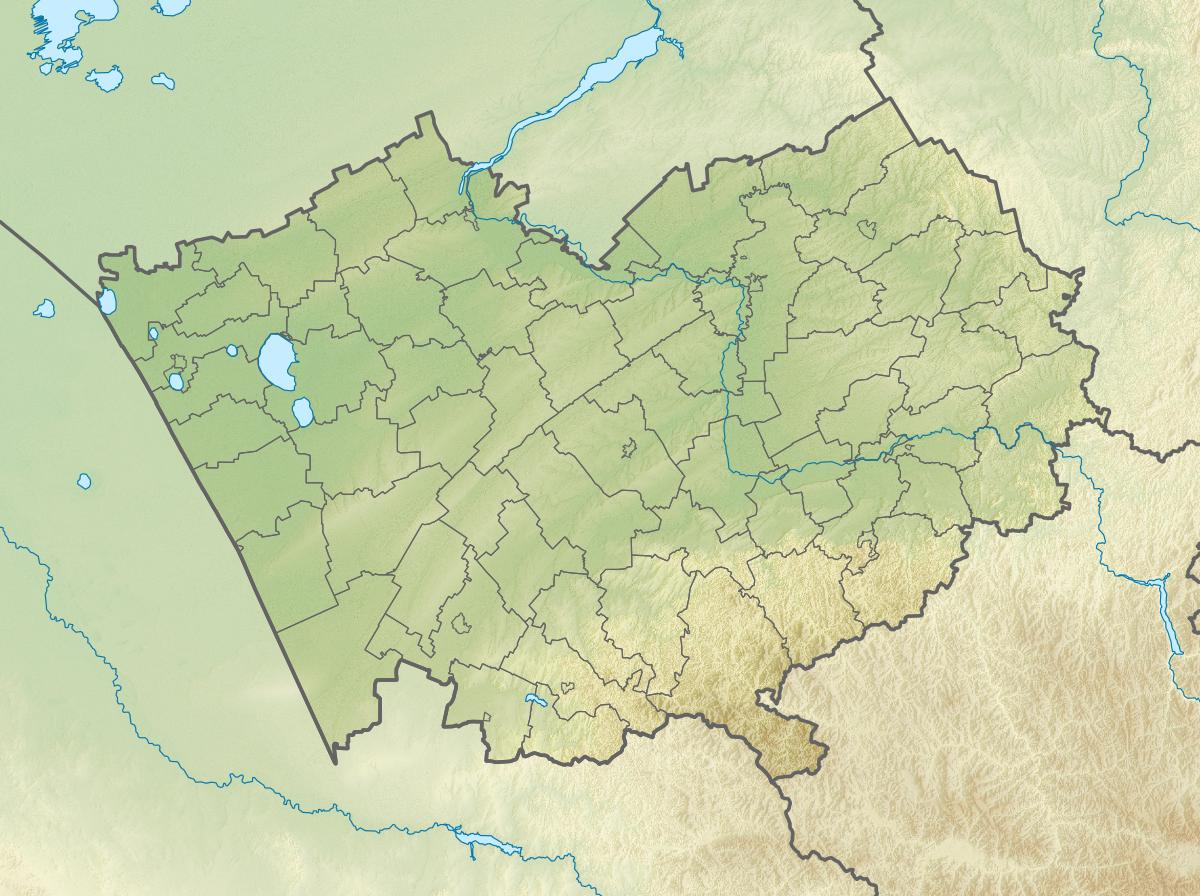
- Location within Altai Krai Location within Russia
- Location: Ob Plateau; West Siberian Plain
- Coordinates: 51°41′48″N 79°44′11″E
- Type: endorheic
- Basin countries: Russia
- Max. length: 6 kilometers (3.7 mi)
- Max. width: 2.6 kilometers (1.6 mi)
- Surface area: 11.4 square kilometers (4.4 sq mi)
- Residence time: UTC+6
- Surface elevation: 154 meters (505 ft)
- Islands: None

Malinovoye (Russian: Малиновое) is a salt lake in Mikhaylovsky District, Altai Krai, Russian Federation.

The lake is located in the southwestern part of the Krai. The nearest inhabited place is Malinovoye Ozero, to the southeast of the southern end. Mikhaylovskoye, the district capital, lies 11 kilometers (6.8 mi) to the north.

== Geography ==
Located at the western edge of the Ob Plateau, near the Kulunda Plain, Malinovoye has an elongated shape, stretching roughly from north to south for approximately 6 kilometers (3.7 mi). The water is saline with a mineralization of 329 grams per liter (52.8 oz/imp gal) and with a pH of 8.4. The concentration of sodium in the water reaches 130 grams per liter (21 oz/imp gal). Halobacterium salinarum bacteria live in the lake, giving it a pink color in certain seasons.

Malinovoye is part of the Borovoye cluster of lakes. Lake Gorkoye-Peresheyechnoye lies 67 kilometers (42 mi) to the east. Sormoildy lies 44 kilometers (27 mi) to the southwest and Bargana 49 kilometers (30 mi) to the west, on the other side of the Russia-Kazakhstan border.

== See also ==
- List of lakes of Russia
