= Rakity, Rubtsovsky District, Altai Krai =

Rakity Ракиты
- Village
- Location within Altai Krai Location within Russia
- Coordinates: 51°26′N 80°41′E
- Country: Russia
- Region: Altai Krai
- District: Rubtsovsky District
- Time zone: UTC+7:00

Rakity (Russian: Ракиты) is a rural locality (a selo) and the administrative center of Rakitovsky Selsoviet of Rubtsovsky District, Altai Krai, Russia. The population was 1,029 in 2016. There are 9 streets.

== Geography ==
Rakity is located 39 km west of Rubtsovsk (the district's administrative centre) by road. Bolshaya Shelkovka is the nearest rural locality.
