= Gorkoye (Yegoryevsky District) =

Salt lake in Altai Krai, Russia

- Горькое
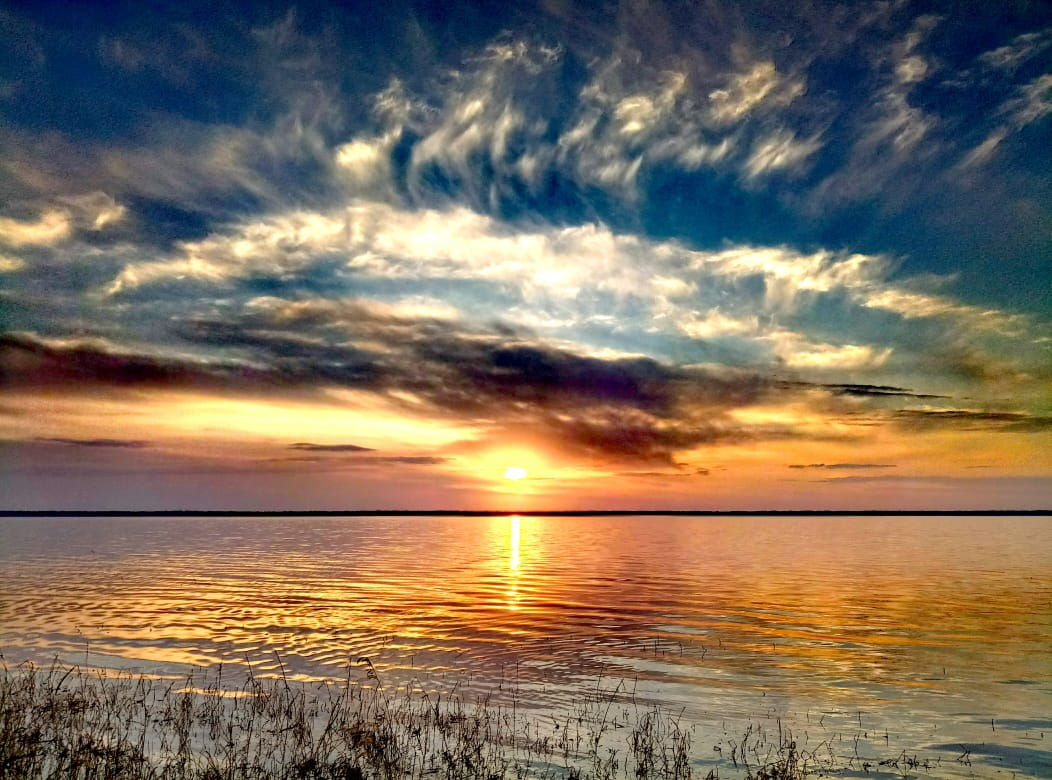
- Panorama of the lake

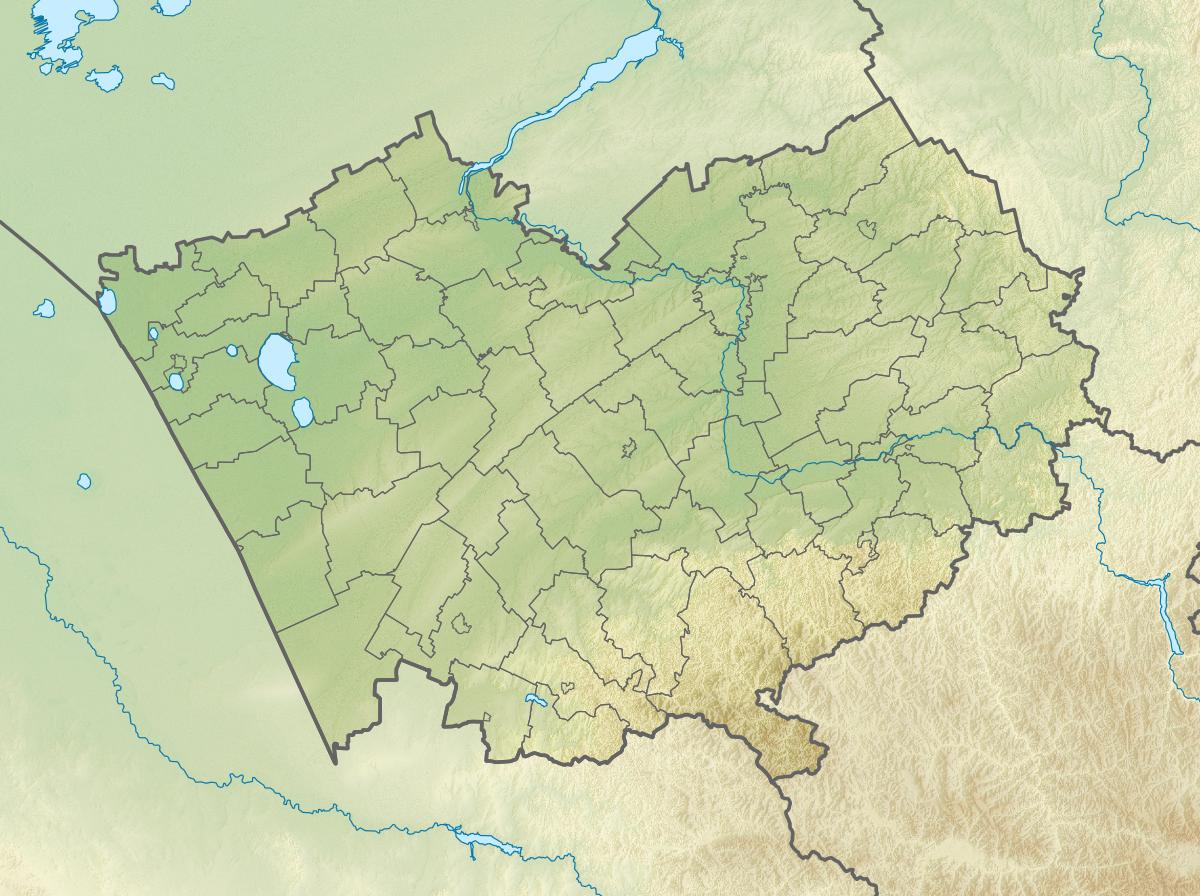
- Location within Altai Krai Location within Russia
- Location: Ob Plateau; West Siberian Plain
- Coordinates: 51°40′35″N 80°46′01″E
- Type: endorheic
- Catchment area: 465 square kilometers (180 sq mi)
- Basin countries: Russia
- Max. length: 14 kilometers (8.7 mi)
- Max. width: 4.5 kilometers (2.8 mi)
- Surface area: 41.8 square kilometers (16.1 sq mi)
- Average depth: 3.5 meters (11 ft)
- Max. depth: 8 meters (26 ft)
- Residence time: UTC+6
- Surface elevation: 218 meters (715 ft)

Gorkoye (Russian: Горькое) is a salt lake in Yegoryevsky District, Altai Krai, Russian Federation.

The lake is located in the southwestern part of the Krai. The nearest town is Lebyazhye, close to the eastern shore. Rubtsovsk town lies 30 kilometers (19 mi) to the east. There is a sanatorium by the eastern lakeshore.

== Geography ==
Gorkoye is one of the longest lakes in Altai Krai. It lies in a wide ravine of glacial origin at the southwestern end of the Ob Plateau, near the Kulunda Plain. The lake has an elongated shape, stretching roughly from NNE to SSW for over 14 kilometers (8.7 mi). Lake Gorkoye-Peresheyechnoye is located barely 1 kilometer (0.62 mi) to the north and is connected with it by a short channel. Gorkoye is deeper than its northern neighbor, with a maximum depth reaching 8 meters (26 ft). Together, both lakes have a combined catchment area of 1,120 square kilometers (430 sq mi).

Pink lake Malinovoye lies 66 kilometers (41 mi) to the west.

== See also ==
- List of lakes of Russia
