= Gorkoye-Peresheyechnoye =

Salt lake in Altai Krai, Russia

- Горькое-Перешеечное
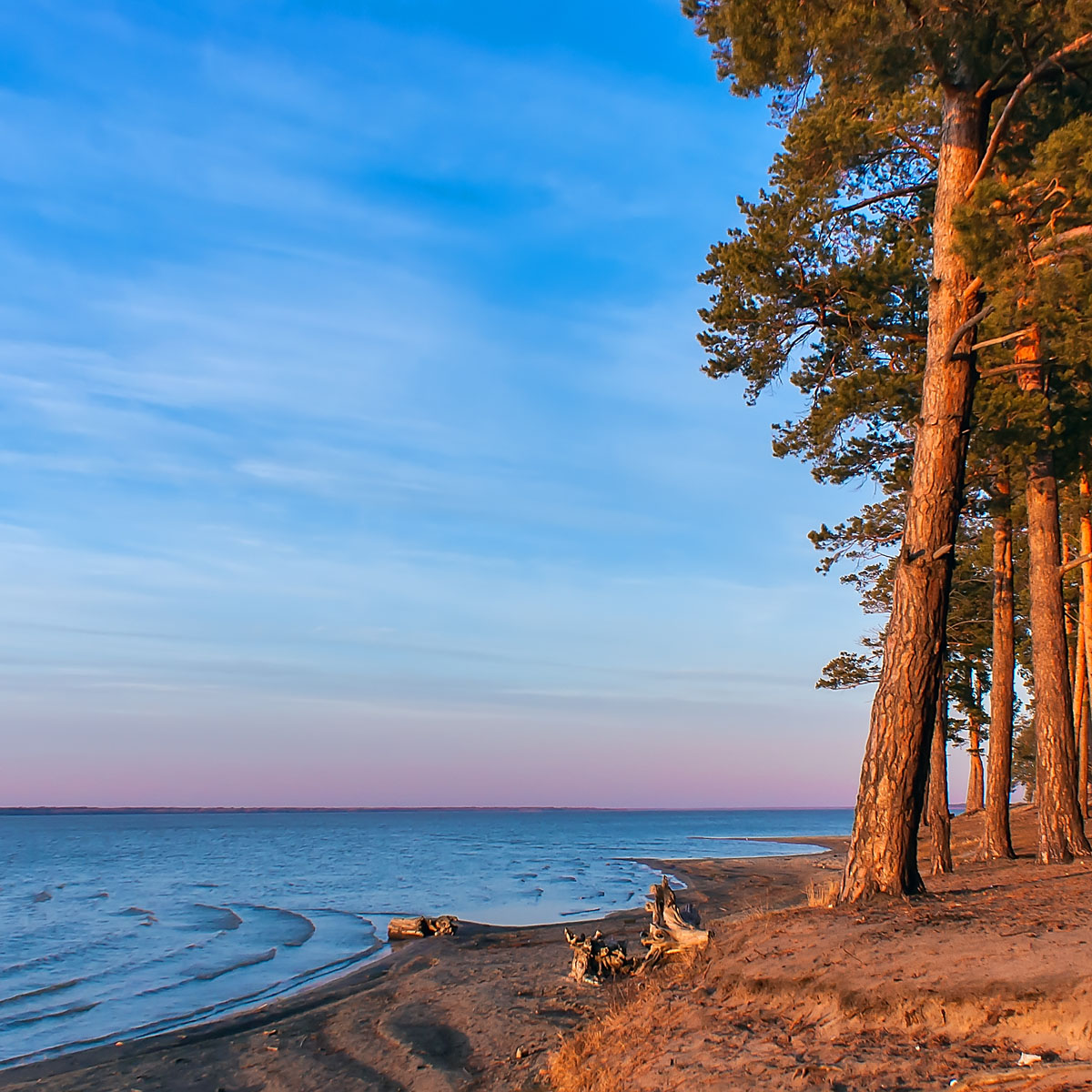
- Lakeside panorama

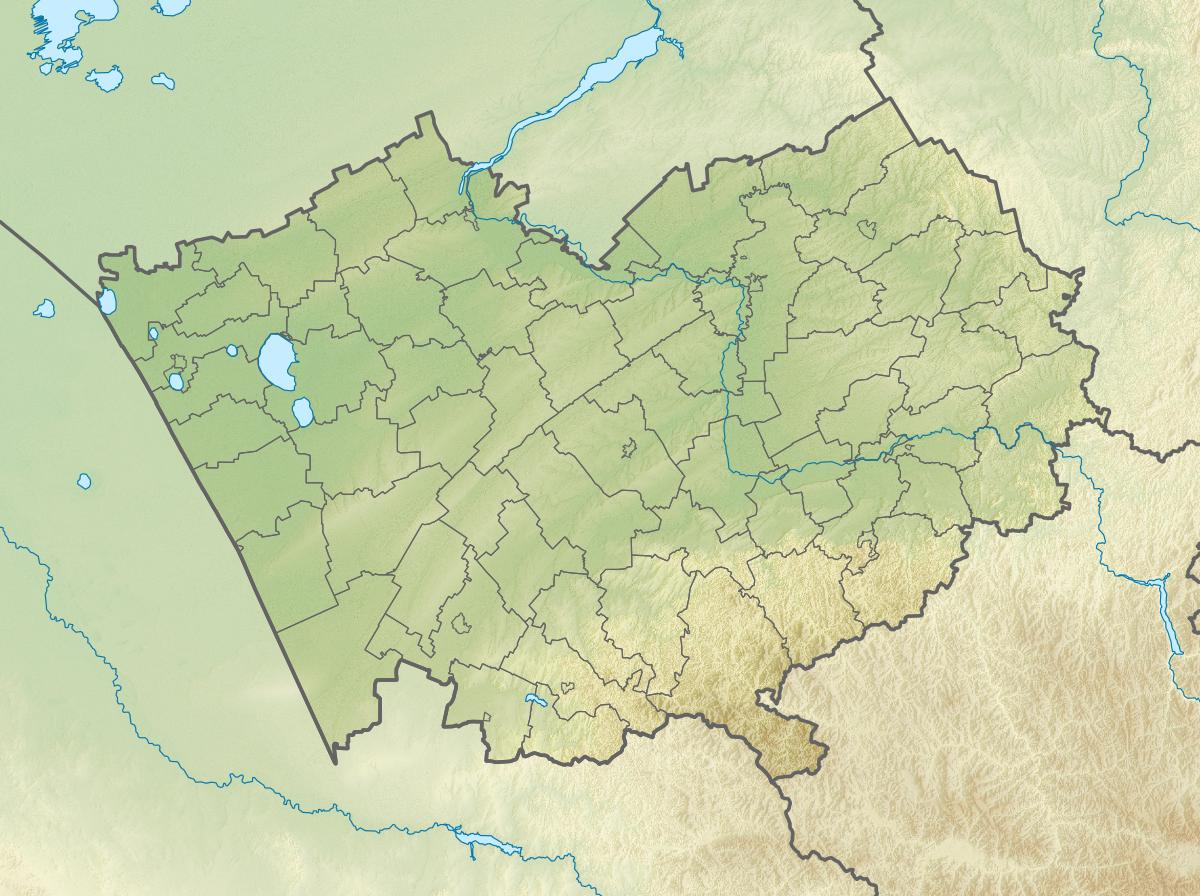
- Location within Altai Krai Location within Russia
- Location: Ob Plateau; West Siberian Plain
- Coordinates: 51°49′54″N 80°54′15″E
- Type: endorheic
- Primary inflows: Solovykha
- Catchment area: 655 square kilometers (253 sq mi)
- Basin countries: Russia
- Max. length: 18.1 kilometers (11.2 mi)
- Max. width: 3.5 kilometers (2.2 mi)
- Surface area: 45.4 square kilometers (17.5 sq mi)
- Average depth: 1.5 meters (4 ft 11 in)
- Max. depth: 2.9 meters (9 ft 6 in)
- Residence time: UTC+6
- Surface elevation: 219 meters (719 ft)
- Islands: None

Gorkoye-Peresheyechnoye (Russian: Горькое-Перешеечное) is a salt lake in Yegoryevsky District, Altai Krai, Russian Federation.

The lake is located in the southwestern part of the Krai. The nearest town is Novoyegoryevskoye, close to the southern shore. Gorkoye-Peresheyechnoye is a tourist attraction, equipped with resorts near the lake. There are pine forests close to the lakeshore.

== Geography ==
Gorkoye-Peresheyechnoye is one of the longest lakes in Altai Krai. It lies in a wide ravine of glacial origin at the southwestern end of the Ob Plateau, near the Kulunda Plain. The lake has an elongated shape, stretching roughly from NNE to SSW for over 18 kilometers (11 mi). The bottom has a between 0.1 meters (3.9 in) and 0.4 meters (1 ft 4 in) thick layer of dark silt that is reputed to have medicinal properties. The mineralization of the mud solution is between 23 grams per liter (3.7 oz/imp gal) and 44 grams per liter (7.1 oz/imp gal). The water is alkaline, sodium bicarbonate and sodium chloride being the predominant ions, with a mineralization of 48.2 grams per liter (7.73 oz/imp gal) and a boric acid concentration of 45.4 grams per liter (7.28 oz/imp gal).

Lake Gorkoye is located barely 1 kilometer (0.62 mi) to the south and is connected with it by a short channel. Lake Gorkoye (Novichikhinsky District) lies 40 kilometers (25 mi) to the northeast and Malinovoye 67 kilometers (42 mi) to the west.

== See also ==
- List of lakes of Russia
