= Mikhaylovskoye, Altai Krai =

Rural locality in Russia

Mikhaylovskoye Михайловское
- Selo
- Interactive map of Mikhaylovskoye
- Location of Mikhaylovskoye Mikhaylovskoye (Altai Krai)
- Coordinates: 51°49′26″N 79°43′02″E
- Country: Russia
- Federal subject: Altai Krai
- Administrative district: Mikhaylovsky District
- SelsovietSelsoviet: Mikhaylovsky Selsoviet
- Founded: 1878

Population (2010 Census)
  - Total: 11,020
  - Estimate (2025): 8,742 (−20.7%)

Administrative status
  - Capital of: Mikhaylovsky District, Mikhaylovsky Selsoviet

Municipal status
  - Municipal district: Mikhaylovsky Municipal District
  - Rural settlement: Mikhaylovsky Selsoviet Rural Settlement
  - Capital of: Mikhaylovsky Municipal District, Mikhaylovsky Selsoviet Rural Settlement
- Time zone: UTC+7 (MSK+4)
- Postal codes: 658960, 658962
- OKTMO ID: 01627416101

Mikhaylovskoye (Russian: Михайловское) is a rural locality (a selo) and the administrative center of Mikhaylovsky District of Altai Krai, Russia. Population: 11,020 (2010 census); 11,558 (2002 census); 10,696 (1989 Soviet census).
