= Mikhaylovsky District, Altai Krai =

Mikhaylovsky District Михайловский район (Russian)
- District
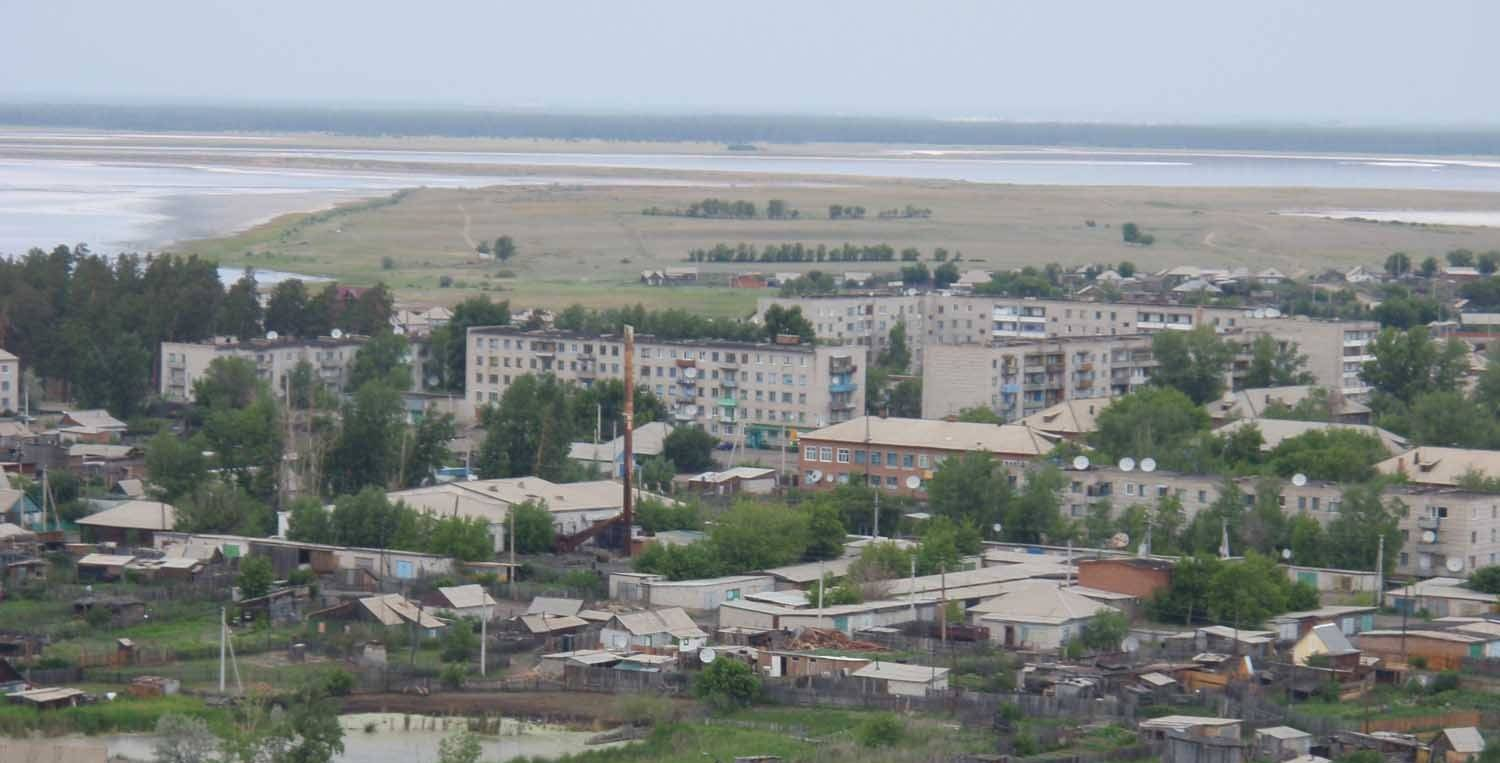
- Malinovoye Lake, Mikhaylovsky District

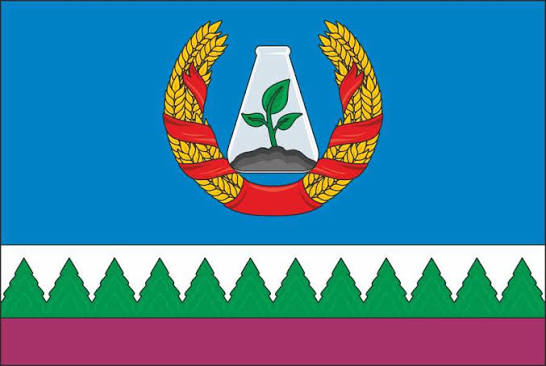
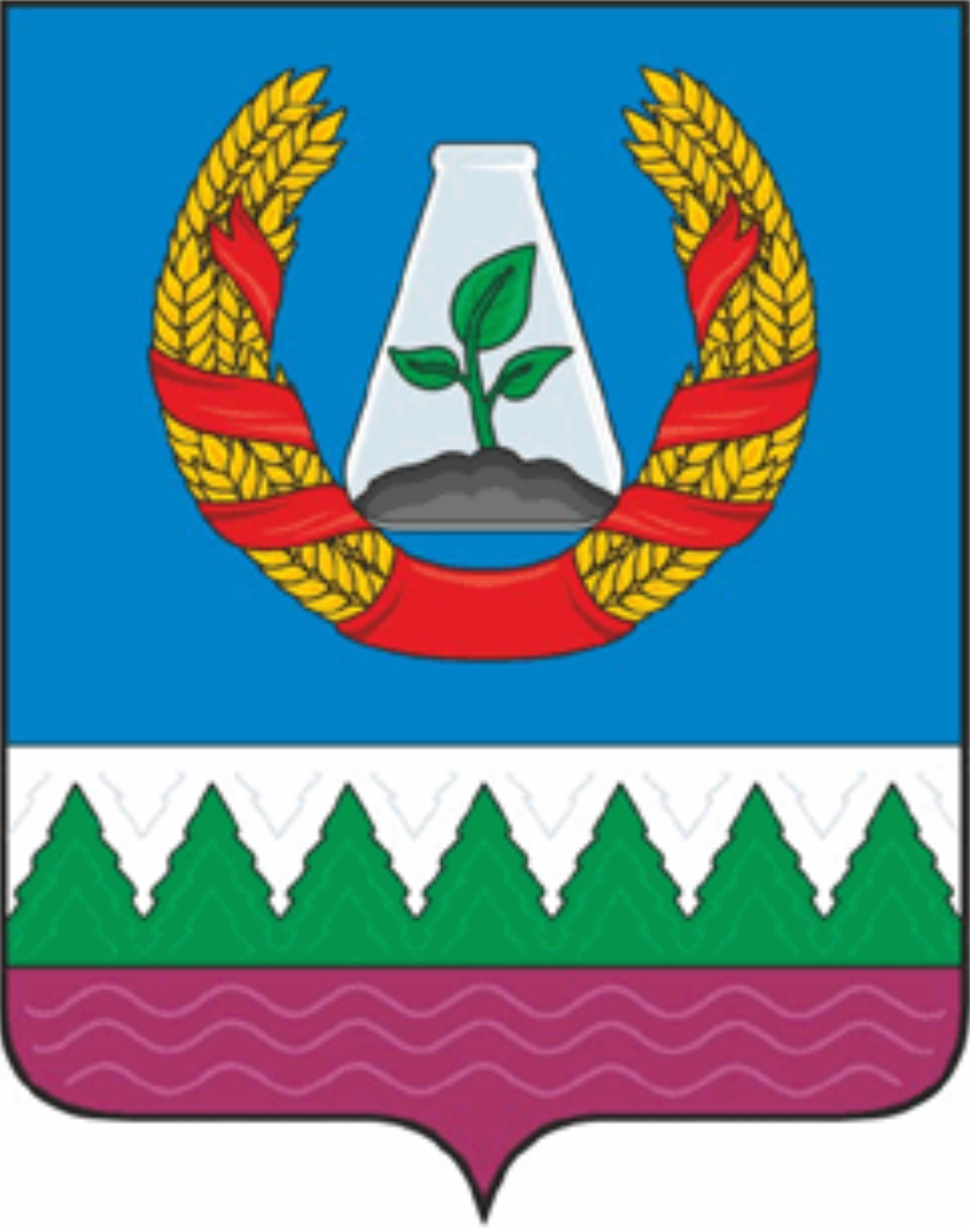
- Flag Coat of arms
- Location of Mikhaylovsky District in Altai Krai
- Coordinates: 51°49′26″N 79°43′02″E
- Country: Russia
- Federal subject: Altai Krai
- Established: March 1941
- Administrative center: Mikhaylovskoye

Area
  - Total: 3,100 km^{2} (1,200 sq mi)

Population (2010 Census)
  - Total: 21,211
  - Density: 6.8/km^{2} (18/sq mi)
  - Urban: 16.9%
  - Rural: 83.1%

Administrative structure
  - Administrative divisions: 1 Settlement administrations, 7 Selsoviets
  - Inhabited localities: 1 urban-type settlements, 10 rural localities

Municipal structure
  - Municipally incorporated as: Mikhaylovsky Municipal District
  - Municipal divisions: 1 urban settlements, 7 rural settlements
- Time zone: UTC+7 (MSK+4)
- OKTMO ID: 01627000
- Website: www.altairegion22.ru

Mikhaylovsky District (Russian: Миха́йловский райо́н) is an administrative and municipal district (raion), one of the fifty-nine in Altai Krai, Russia. It is located in the southwest of the krai. The area of the district is 3,100 square kilometers (1,200 sq mi). Its administrative center is the rural locality (a selo) of Mikhaylovskoye. Population: 21,211 (2010 census); 23,797 (2002 census); 24,044 (1989 Soviet census). The population of Mikhaylovskoye accounts for 52.0% of the district's total population.

== Geography ==
Pink lake Malinovoye and lake Gornostalevo are located in the district.
