= Novoyegoryevskoye, Altai Krai =

Rural locality in Russia

Novoyegoryevskoye Новоегорьевское
- Selo
- Interactive map of Novoyegoryevskoye
- Location of Novoyegoryevskoye Novoyegoryevskoye (Altai Krai)
- Coordinates: 51°45′24″N 80°53′38″E
- Country: Russia
- Federal subject: Altai Krai
- Administrative district: Yegoryevsky District
- SelsovietSelsoviet: Novoyegoryevsky Selsoviet
- Founded: 1884

Population (2010 Census)
  - Total: 5,794
  - Estimate (2021): 5,020 (−13.4%)

Administrative status
  - Capital of: Yegoryevsky District, Novoyegoryevsky Selsoviet

Municipal status
  - Municipal district: Yegoryevsky Municipal District
  - Rural settlement: Novoyegoryevsky Selsoviet Rural Settlement
  - Capital of: Yegoryevsky Municipal District, Novoyegoryevsky Selsoviet Rural Settlement
- Time zone: UTC+7 (MSK+4)
- Postal code: 658280
- OKTMO ID: 01609433101

Novoyegoryevskoye (Russian: Новоегорьевское) is a rural locality (a selo) and the administrative center of Yegoryevsky District of Altai Krai, Russia. Population: 5,794 (2010 census); 6,217 (2002 census); 5,985 (1989 Soviet census).

== Geography ==
Lakes Gorkoye and Gorkoye-Peresheyechnoye are located near Novoyegoryevskoye.
