= Yegoryevsky District, Altai Krai =

Yegoryevsky District Егорьевский район (Russian)
- District
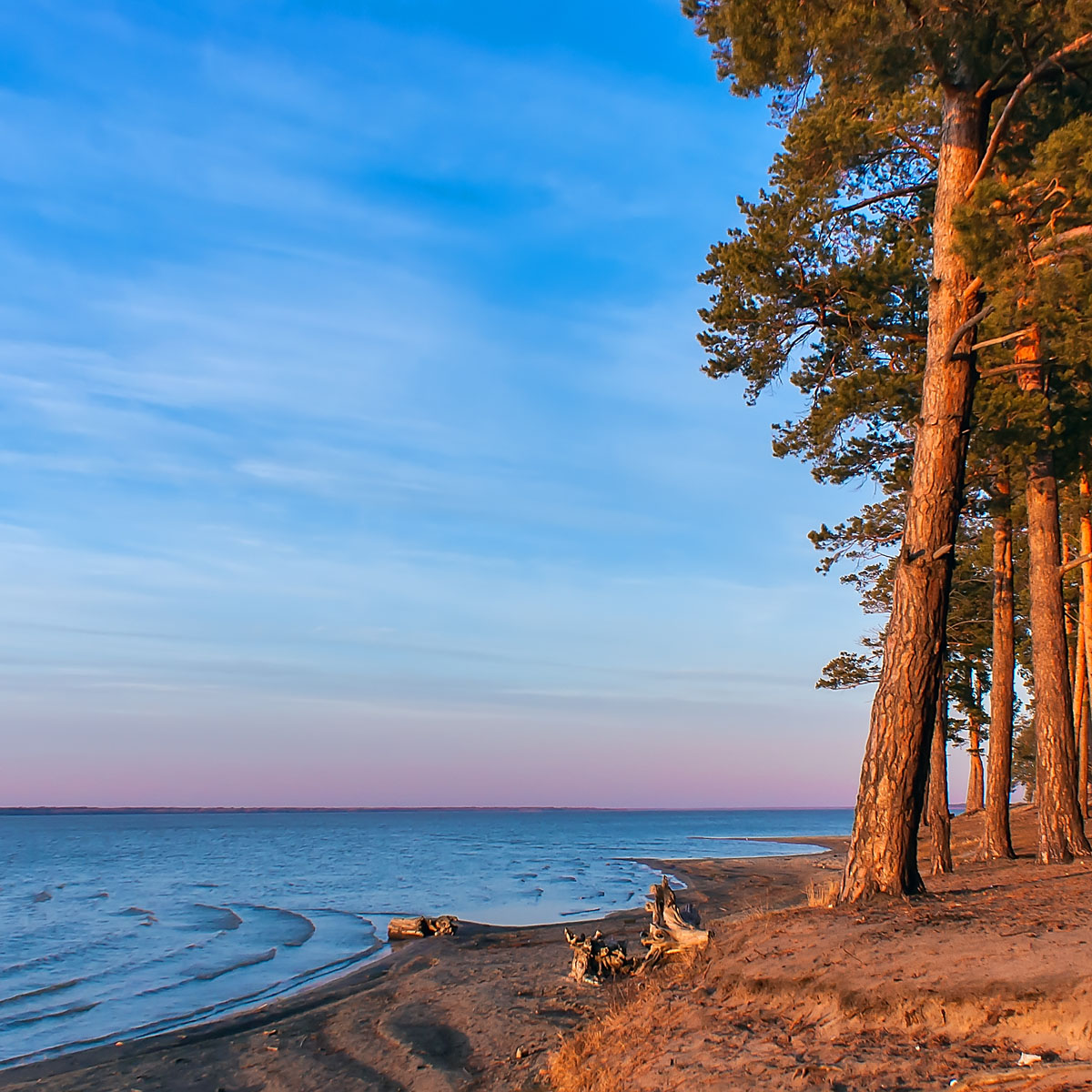
- Lake Gorkoye-Peresheyechnoye

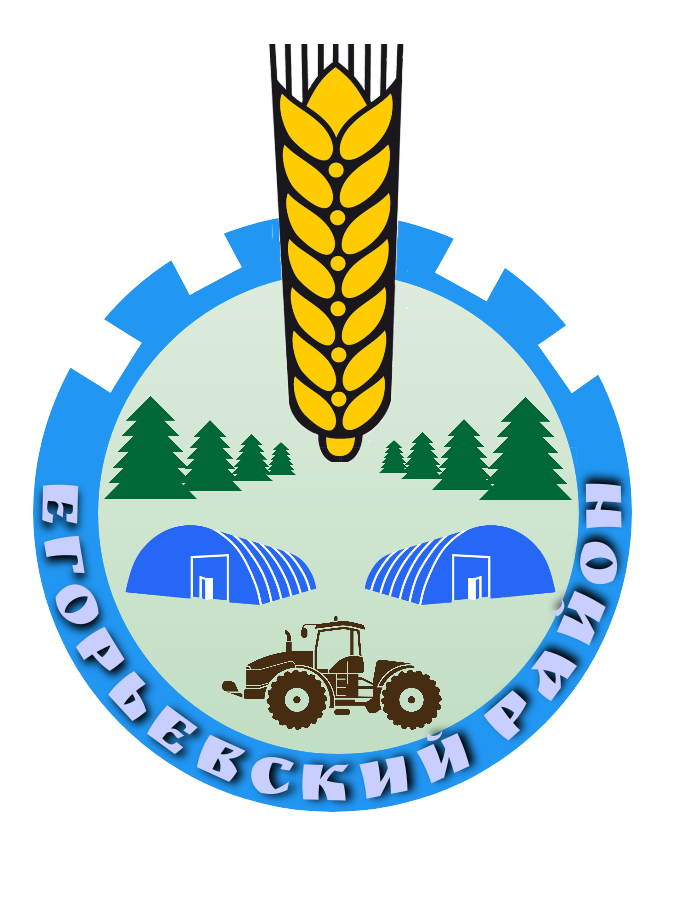
- Coat of arms
- Location of Yegoryevsky District in Altai Krai
- Coordinates: 51°46′N 80°52′E
- Country: Russia
- Federal subject: Altai Krai
- Established: 18 January 1935
- Administrative center: Novoyegoryevskoye

Area
  - Total: 2,500 km^{2} (970 sq mi)

Population (2010 Census)
  - Total: 14,170
  - Density: 5.7/km^{2} (15/sq mi)
  - Urban: 0%
  - Rural: 100%

Administrative structure
  - Administrative divisions: 8 selsoviet
  - Inhabited localities: 19 rural localities

Municipal structure
  - Municipally incorporated as: Yegoryevsky Municipal District
  - Municipal divisions: 0 urban settlements, 8 rural settlements
- Time zone: UTC+7 (MSK+4)
- OKTMO ID: 01609000
- Website: http://egadmin.ucoz.ru/

Yegoryevsky District (Russian: Его́рьевский райо́н) is an administrative and municipal district (raion), one of the fifty-nine in Altai Krai, Russia. It is located in the southwest of the krai. The area of the district is 2,500 square kilometers (970 sq mi). Its administrative center is the rural locality (a selo) of Novoyegoryevskoye. Population: 14,170 (2010 census); 16,024 (2002 census); 15,919 (1989 Soviet census). The population of Novoyegoryevskoye accounts for 40.9% of the district's total population.

== Geography ==
Lakes Gorkoye and Gorkoye-Peresheyechnoye are located in the district.
