= Topolnoye =

Topolnoye may refer to:

- Topolnoye (Khabarsky District), a village in Altai Krai, Russia
- Topolnoye (Soloneshensky District), a village in Altai Krai, Russia
- Topolnoye (Uglovsky District), a village in Altai Krai, Russia
- Topolnoye (lake), a lake in Altai Krai, Russia
- Bolshoye Topolnoye, a lake in Altai Krai, Russia
