= Novoandreyevka =

Novoandreyevka (Russian: Новоандреевка) is the name of several rural localities Russia:

- Novoandreyevka, Altai Krai, a selo in Novoandreyevsky Selsoviet of Burlinsky District
- Novoandreyevka, Amur Oblast, a selo in Velikoknyazevsky Selsoviet of Belogorsky District
