= Khorosheye =

Khorosheye may refer to:

- Khorosheye (Altai Krai)
- Khorosheye (lake)
- Khorosheye (Novosibirsk Oblast)
