= Novoalexeyevka, Altai Krai =

Novoalexeyevka Новоалексеевка
- Selo
- Location within Altai Krai Location within Russia
- Coordinates: 53°23′N 78°34′E
- Country: Russia
- Region: Altai Krai
- District: Burlinsky District
- Time zone: UTC+7:00

Novoalexeyevka (Russian: Новоалексеевка) is a rural locality (a selo) in Novopeschansky Selsoviet, Burlinsky District, Altai Krai, Russia. The population was 140 as of 2013. It was founded in 1907. There are 4 streets.

== Geography ==
Novoalexeyevka is located near the southern shore of lake Peschanoye of the Burla river basin 25 kilometers (16 mi) northeast of Burla (the district's administrative centre) by road. Novopeschanoye is the nearest rural locality.
