= Khabary =

Khabary (Russian: Хабары) is the name of several rural localities in Russia:

- Khabary, Khabarsky Selsoviet, Khabarsky District, Altai Krai, a selo in Khabarsky Selsoviet of Khabarsky District of Altai Krai
- Khabary, Korotoyaksky Selsoviet, Khabarsky District, Altai Krai, a station in Korotoyaksky Selsoviet of Khabarsky District of Altai Krai
- Khabary, Tver Oblast, a village in Rybinskoye Rural Settlement of Maksatikhinsky District of Tver Oblast
