= Novoplotava =

Novoplotava Новоплотава
- Settlement
- Location within Altai Krai Location within Russia
- Coordinates: 53°30′N 79°45′E
- Country: Russia
- Region: Altai Krai
- District: Khabarsky District
- Time zone: UTC+7:00

Novoplotava (Russian: Новоплотава) is a rural locality (a settlement) in Michurinsky Selsoviet, Khabarsky District, Altai Krai, Russia. The population was 277 as of 2013.

== Geography ==
Novoplotava is located 28 km southeast of Khabary (the district's administrative centre) by road. Michurinskoye is the nearest rural locality.
