= Staropeschanoye =

Staropeschanoye Старопесчаное
- Selo
- Location within Altai Krai Location within Russia
- Coordinates: 53°24′N 78°38′E
- Country: Russia
- Region: Altai Krai
- District: Burlinsky District
- Time zone: UTC+7:00

Staropeschanoye (Russian: Старопесчаное) is a rural locality (a selo) in Novopeschansky Selsoviet, Burlinsky District, Altai Krai, Russia. The population was 5 as of 2013. It was founded in 1826.

== Geography ==
Staropeschanoye is located near the Burla river, on the Peschannoye Lake, 32 km northeast of Burla (the district's administrative centre) by road. Novoalexeyevka is the nearest rural locality.
