= Burlinka =

Burlinka Бурлинка
- Selo
- Location within Altai Krai Location within Russia
- Coordinates: 53°11′N 78°29′E
- Country: Russia
- Region: Altai Krai
- District: Burlinsky District
- Time zone: UTC+7:00

Burlinka (Russian: Бурлинка) is a rural locality (a selo) in Partizansky Selsoviet, Burlinsky District, Altai Krai, Russia. The population was 41 as of 2011. It was founded in 1908. There are 2 streets.

== Geography ==
Burlinka is located 23 km southeast of Burla (the district's administrative centre) by road. Bursol is the nearest rural locality.
