= Prityka =

Prityka Притыка
- Selo
- Location within Altai Krai Location within Russia
- Coordinates: 53°15′N 78°14′E
- Country: Russia
- Region: Altai Krai
- District: Burlinsky District
- Time zone: UTC+7:00

Prityka (Russian: Притыка) is a rural locality (a selo) in Mikhaylovsky Selsoviet, Burlinsky District, Altai Krai, Russia. The population was 277 as of 2013. It was founded in 1923. There are 2 streets.

== Geography ==
Prityka is located near the Burla river, 10 km southwest of Burla (the district's administrative centre) by road. Mikhaylovka is the nearest rural locality.
