= Malopavlovka =

Malopavlovka Малопавловка
- Settlement
- Location within Altai Krai Location within Russia
- Coordinates: 53°25′N 79°37′E
- Country: Russia
- Region: Altai Krai
- District: Khabarsky District
- Time zone: UTC+7:00

Malopavlovka (Russian: Малопавловка) is a rural locality (a settlement) in Sverdlovsky Selsoviet, Khabarsky District, Altai Krai, Russia. The population was 165 as of 2013. It was founded in 1907. There are 2 streets.

== Geography ==
Malopavlovka is located 24 km south of Khabary (the district's administrative centre) by road. Malopavlovka is the nearest rural locality.
