= Kineral =

Kineral Кинерал
- Selo
- Location within Altai Krai Location within Russia
- Coordinates: 53°27′N 78°16′E
- Country: Russia
- Region: Altai Krai
- District: Burlinsky District
- Time zone: UTC+7:00

Kineral (Russian: Кинерал) is a rural locality (a selo) in Burlinsky Selsoviet, Burlinsky District, Altai Krai, Russia. The population was 7 as of 2013. It was founded in 1911. There is 1 street.

== Geography ==
Kineral is located 19 km north of Burla (the district's administrative centre) by road. Mirny is the nearest rural locality.
