= Dobrovolshchina =

Dobrovolshchina Добровольщина
- Settlement
- Location within Altai Krai Location within Russia
- Coordinates: 53°17′N 79°38′E
- Country: Russia
- Region: Altai Krai
- District: Khabarsky District
- Time zone: UTC+7:00

Dobrovolshchina (Russian: Добровольщина) is a rural locality (a settlement) in Sverdlovsky Selsoviet, Khabarsky District, Altai Krai, Russia. The population was 46 as of 2013. It was founded in 1909. There is 1 street.

== Geography ==
Dobrovolshchina is located 42 km south of Khabary (the district's administrative centre) by road. Sverdlovskoye is the nearest rural locality.
