= Zyatkova Rechka =

Zyatkova Rechka Зятькова Речка
- Selo
- Location within Altai Krai Location within Russia
- Coordinates: 53°28′N 79°56′E
- Country: Russia
- Region: Altai Krai
- District: Khabarsky District
- Time zone: UTC+7:00

Zyatkova Rechka (Russian: Зятькова Речка) is a rural locality (a selo) and the administrative center of Zyatkovo-Rechensky Selsoviet, Khabarsky District, Altai Krai, Russia. The population was 646 as of 2013. It was founded in 1860. There are 12 streets.

== Geography ==
Zyatkova Rechka is located 45 km southeast of Khabary (the district's administrative centre) by road. Poperechnoye is the nearest rural locality.
