= Bigeldy =

Bigeldy Бигельды
- Selo
- Location within Altai Krai Location within Russia
- Coordinates: 53°27′N 78°08′E
- Country: Russia
- Region: Altai Krai
- District: Burlinsky District
- Time zone: UTC+7:00

Bigeldy (Russian: Бигельды) is a rural locality (a selo) in Novoselsky Selsoviet, Burlinsky District, Altai Krai, Russia. The population was 30 as of 2013. It was founded in 1911. There are 2 streets.

== Geography ==
Bigeldy is located 25 km northwest of Burla (the district's administrative centre) by road. Novoselskoye is the nearest rural locality.
