= Pervomayskoye, Burlinsky District, Altai Krai =

Pervomayskoye Первомайское
- Selo
- Location within Altai Krai Location within Russia
- Coordinates: 53°21′N 78°14′E
- Country: Russia
- Region: Altai Krai
- District: Burlinsky District
- Time zone: UTC+7:00

Pervomayskoye (Russian: Первомайское) is a rural locality (a selo) in Burlinsky Selsoviet, Burlinsky District, Altai Krai, Russia. The population was 180 as of 2013. There are 4 streets.

== Geography ==
Pervomayskoye is located 7 km northwest of Burla (the district's administrative centre) by road. Burla is the nearest rural locality.
