= Novovasilyevka, Altai Krai =

Novovasilyevka Нововасильевка
- Settlement
- Location within Altai Krai Location within Russia
- Coordinates: 53°23′N 79°38′E
- Country: Russia
- Region: Altai Krai
- District: Khabarsky District
- Time zone: UTC+7:00

Novovasilyevka (Russian: Нововасильевка) is a rural locality (a settlement) in Sverdlovsky Selsoviet, Khabarsky District, Altai Krai, Russia. The population was 51 as of 2013. It was founded in 1908. There is 1 street.

== Geography ==
Novovasilyevka is located 31 km south of Khabary (the district's administrative centre) by road. Malopavlovka is the nearest rural locality.
