= Ust-Kurya =

Ust-Kurya Усть-Курья
- Settlement
- Location within Altai Krai Location within Russia
- Coordinates: 53°39′N 79°44′E
- Country: Russia
- Region: Altai Krai
- District: Khabarsky District
- Time zone: UTC+7:00

Ust-Kurya (Russian: Усть-Курья) is a rural locality (a settlement) in Korotoyaksky Selsoviet, Khabarsky District, Altai Krai, Russia. The population was 157 as of 2013. It was founded in 1876. There are 3 streets.

== Geography ==
Ust-Kurya is located 16 km east of Khabary (the district's administrative centre) by road. Kalinovka is the nearest rural locality.
