= Utyanka =

Utyanka Утянка
- Selo
- Location within Altai Krai Location within Russia
- Coordinates: 53°35′N 79°27′E
- Country: Russia
- Region: Altai Krai
- District: Khabarsky District
- Time zone: UTC+7:00

Utyanka (Russian: Утянка) is a rural locality (a selo) in Utyansky Selsoviet, Khabarsky District, Altai Krai, Russia. The population was 989 as of 2013. It was founded in 1891. There are 13 streets.

== Geography ==
Utyanka is located near the Burla river, 8 km southwest of Khabary (the district's administrative centre) by road. Alekseyevka is the nearest rural locality.
