= Novoilyinka =

Novoilyinka Новоильинка
- Selo
- Location within Altai Krai Location within Russia
- Coordinates: 53°33′N 79°16′E
- Country: Russia
- Region: Altai Krai
- District: Khabarsky District
- Time zone: UTC+7:00

Novoilyinka (Russian: Новоильинка) is a rural locality (a selo) and the administrative center of Novoilyinsky Selsoviet, Khabarsky District, Altai Krai, Russia. The population was 1,369 as of 2013. There are 22 streets.

== Geography ==
Novoilyinka is located near the Burla river, 20 km southwest of Khabary (the district's administrative centre) by road. Utyanka is the nearest rural locality.
