= Alexeyevka, Khabarsky District, Altai Krai =

Alexeyevka Алексеевка
- Settlement
- Location within Altai Krai Location within Russia
- Coordinates: 53°37′N 79°28′E
- Country: Russia
- Region: Altai Krai
- District: Khabarsky District
- Time zone: UTC+7:00

Alexeyevka (Russian: Алексеевка) is a rural locality (a settlement) in Utyansky Selsoviet, Khabarsky District, Altai Krai, Russia. The population was 165 as of 2013. It was founded in 1905. There are 3 streets.

== Geography ==
Alexeyevka is located near the Burla river, 5 km west of Khabary (the district's administrative centre) by road. Utyanka is the nearest rural locality.
