= Moskovka =

Moskovka (Russian: Московка) is the name of several rural localities in Russia:

- Moskovka, Altai Krai, a settlement in Michurinsky Selsoviet of Khabarsky District of Altai Krai
- Moskovka, Kemerovo Oblast, a settlement in Berikulskaya Rural Territory of Tisulsky District of Kemerovo Oblast
- Moskovka, Krasnoyarsk Krai, a village in Stepnovsky Selsoviet of Nazarovsky District of Krasnoyarsk Krai
- Moskovka, Dobrinsky District, Lipetsk Oblast, a village in Talitsky Selsoviet of Dobrinsky District of Lipetsk Oblast
- Moskovka, Dryazginsky Selsoviet, Usmansky District, Lipetsk Oblast, a selo in Dryazginsky Selsoviet of Usmansky District of Lipetsk Oblast
- Moskovka, Nikolsky Selsoviet, Usmansky District, Lipetsk Oblast, a village in Nikolsky Selsoviet of Usmansky District of Lipetsk Oblast
- Moskovka, Republic of Mordovia, a selo in Khilkovsky Selsoviet of Torbeyevsky District of the Republic of Mordovia
- Moskovka, Moscow Oblast, a village in Vasilyevskoye Rural Settlement of Serpukhovsky District of Moscow Oblast
- Moskovka, Novosibirsk Oblast, a settlement in Ubinsky District of Novosibirsk Oblast
- Moskovka, Ryazan Oblast, a village in Shelemishevsky Rural Okrug of Skopinsky District of Ryazan Oblast
- Moskovka, Smolensk Oblast, a village in Pokrovskoye Rural Settlement of Gagarinsky District of Smolensk Oblast
- Moskovka, Tver Oblast, a village in Mostovskoye Rural Settlement of Oleninsky District of Tver Oblast
- Moskovka, Nizhnetavdinsky District, Tyumen Oblast, a village in Velizhansky Rural Okrug of Nizhnetavdinsky District of Tyumen Oblast
- Moskovka, Sorokinsky District, Tyumen Oblast, a village in Alexandrovsky Rural Okrug of Sorokinsky District of Tyumen Oblast
- Moskovka, Uporovsky District, Tyumen Oblast, a village in Skorodumsky Rural Okrug of Uporovsky District of Tyumen Oblast
