= Petrovka, Burlinsky District, Altai Krai =

Petrovka Петровка
- Selo
- Location within Altai Krai Location within Russia
- Coordinates: 53°21′N 78°03′E
- Country: Russia
- Region: Altai Krai
- District: Burlinsky District
- Time zone: UTC+7:00

Petrovka (Russian: Петровка) is a rural locality (a selo) in Burlinsky Selsoviet, Burlinsky District, Altai Krai, Russia. The population was 171 as of 2013. It was founded in 1909. There are 5 streets.

== Geography ==
Petrovka is located near the Burla river and the Bolshoye Topolnoye lake, 33 km northwest of Burla (the district's administrative centre) by road. Pervomayskoye is the nearest rural locality.
