= Plyoso-Kurya =

Plyoso-Kurya Плёсо-Курья
- Selo
- Location within Altai Krai Location within Russia
- Coordinates: 53°37′N 79°55′E
- Country: Russia
- Region: Altai Krai
- District: Khabarsky District
- Time zone: UTC+7:00

Plyoso-Kurya (Russian: Плёсо-Курья) is a rural locality (a selo) and the administrative center of Plyoso-Kuryinsky Selsoviet, Khabarsky District, Altai Krai, Russia. The population was 396 as of 2013. It was founded in 1726. There are 8 streets.

== Geography ==
Plyoso-Kurya is located 30 km east of Khabary (the district's administrative centre) by road. Serp i Molot is the nearest rural locality.
