= Ustyanka, Burlinsky District, Altai Krai =

Ustyanka Устьянка
- Selo
- Location within Altai Krai Location within Russia
- Coordinates: 53°26′N 78°44′E
- Country: Russia
- Region: Altai Krai
- District: Burlinsky District
- Time zone: UTC+7:00

Ustyanka (Russian: Устьянка) is a rural locality (a selo) and the administrative center of Ustyansky Selsoviet, Burlinsky District, Altai Krai, Russia. The population was 982 as of 2013. It was founded in 1891. There are 4 streets.

== Geography ==
Ustyanka is located by lakes Khomutinoye and Kabanye of the Burla river basin, 40 km northeast of Burla (the district's administrative centre) by road. Lesnoye is the nearest rural locality.
