= Serp i Molot, Altai Krai =

Serp i Molot Серп и Молот
- Settlement
- Location within Altai Krai Location within Russia
- Coordinates: 53°40′N 79°51′E
- Country: Russia
- Region: Altai Krai
- District: Khabarsky District
- Time zone: UTC+7:00

Serp i Molot (Russian: Серп и Молот) is a rural locality (a settlement) in Plyoso-Kuryinsky Selsoviet, Khabarsky District, Altai Krai, Russia. The population was 35 as of 2013. There are 3 streets.

== Geography ==
Serp i Molot is located 22 km east of Khabary (the district's administrative centre) by road. Pleso-Kurya is the nearest rural locality.
