= Mikhaylovka, Burlinsky District, Altai Krai =

Mikhaylovka Михайловка
- Selo
- Location within Altai Krai Location within Russia
- Coordinates: 53°14′N 78°09′E
- Country: Russia
- Region: Altai Krai
- District: Burlinsky District
- Time zone: UTC+7:00

Mikhaylovka (Russian: Михайловка) is a rural locality (a selo) and the administrative center of Mikhaylovsky Selsoviet, Burlinsky District, Altai Krai, Russia. The population was 858 as of 2013. It was founded in 1909. There are 7 streets.

== Geography ==
Mikhaylovka is located near the Burla river and the Bolshoye Topolnoye lake, 18 km southwest of Burla (the district's administrative centre) by road. Prityka is the nearest rural locality.
