= Yasnaya Polyana, Khabarsky District, Altai Krai =

Yasnaya Polyana Ясная Поляна
- Settlement
- Location within Altai Krai Location within Russia
- Coordinates: 53°31′N 79°37′E
- Country: Russia
- Region: Altai Krai
- District: Khabarsky District
- Time zone: UTC+7:00

Yasnaya Polyana (Russian: Ясная Поляна) is a rural locality (a settlement) in Michurinsky Selsoviet, Khabarsky District, Altai Krai, Russia. The population was 49 as of 2013. There is 1 street.

== Geography ==
Yasnaya Polyana is located 19 km southeast of Khabary (the district's administrative centre) by road. Novoplotava is the nearest rural locality.
