= Smirnovsky, Altai Krai =

Smirnovsky Смирновский
- Settlement
- Location within Altai Krai Location within Russia
- Coordinates: 53°48′N 79°48′E
- Country: Russia
- Region: Altai Krai
- District: Khabarsky District
- Time zone: UTC+7:00

Smirnovsky (Russian: Смирновский) is a rural locality (a settlement) in Korotoyaksky Selsoviet, Khabarsky District, Altai Krai, Russia. The population was 45 as of 2013. It was founded in 1920. There are 2 streets.

== Geography ==
Smirnovsky is located 30 km northeast of Khabary (the district's administrative centre) by road. Khabarovsky is the nearest rural locality.
