= Kirillovka, Altai Krai =

Kirillovka Кирилловка
- Selo
- Location within Altai Krai Location within Russia
- Coordinates: 53°27′N 78°54′E
- Country: Russia
- Region: Altai Krai
- District: Burlinsky District
- Time zone: UTC+7:00

Kirillovka (Russian: Кирилловка) is a rural locality (a selo) in Ustyansky Selsoviet, Burlinsky District, Altai Krai, Russia. The population was 14 as of 2013. It was founded in 1911. There is 1 street.

== Geography ==
Kirillovka is located 72 km (45 mi) east of Burla (the district's administrative centre) by road. Bogatskoye is the nearest rural locality.
