= Tsvetopol =

Tsvetopol Цветополь
- Selo
- Location within Altai Krai Location within Russia
- Coordinates: 53°11′N 78°14′E
- Country: Russia
- Region: Altai Krai
- District: Burlinsky District
- Time zone: UTC+7:00

Tsvetopol (Russian: Цветополь) is a rural locality (a selo) in Mikhaylovsky Selsoviet, Burlinsky District, Altai Krai, Russia. The population was 212 as of 2013. There are 2 streets.

== Geography ==
Tsvetopol is located 20 km southwest of Burla (the district's administrative centre) by road. Orekhovo and Chernavka are the nearest rural localities.
