= Novoselskoye =

Novoselskoye Новосельское
- Selo
- Location within Altai Krai Location within Russia
- Coordinates: 53°31′N 78°08′E
- Country: Russia
- Region: Altai Krai
- District: Burlinsky District
- Time zone: UTC+7:00

Novoselskoye (Russian: Новосельское) is a rural locality (a selo) and the administrative center of Novoselsky Selsoviet, Burlinsky District, Altai Krai, Russia. The population was 827 as of 2013. It was founded in 1968. There are 14 streets.

== Geography ==
Novoselskoye is located 27 km northwest of Burla (the district's administrative centre) by road. Bigeldy is the nearest rural locality.
