= Novopeschanoye =

Novopeschanoye Новопесчаное
- Selo
- Location within Altai Krai Location within Russia
- Coordinates: 53°24′N 78°31′E
- Country: Russia
- Region: Altai Krai
- District: Burlinsky District
- Time zone: UTC+7:00

Novopeschanoye (Russian: Новопесчаное) is a rural locality (a selo) and the administrative center of Novopeschansky Selsoviet, Burlinsky District, Altai Krai, Russia. The population was 774 as of 2013. It was founded in 1891. There are 9 streets.

== Geography ==
Novopeschanoye is located near lake Peschanoye of the Burla river basin 21 kilometers (13 mi) northeast of Burla (the district's administrative centre) by road. Novoalexeyevka is the nearest rural locality.
