= Kalinovka, Khabarsky District, Altai Krai =

Kalinovka Калиновка
- Settlement
- Location within Altai Krai Location within Russia
- Coordinates: 53°42′N 79°38′E
- Country: Russia
- Region: Altai Krai
- District: Khabarsky District
- Time zone: UTC+7:00

Kalinovka (Russian: Калиновка) is a rural locality (a settlement) in Korotoyaksky Selsoviet, Khabarsky District, Altai Krai, Russia. The population was 40 as of 2013. It was founded in 1926. There is 1 street.

== Geography ==
Kalinovka is located 15 km northeast of Khabary (the district's administrative centre) by road. Korotoyak is the nearest rural locality.
