= Pioner Truda =

Pioner Truda Пионер Труда
- Settlement
- Location within Altai Krai Location within Russia
- Coordinates: 53°32′N 79°05′E
- Country: Russia
- Region: Altai Krai
- District: Khabarsky District
- Time zone: UTC+7:00

Pioner Truda (Russian: Пионер Труда) is a rural locality (a settlement) in Novoilyinsky Selsoviet, Khabarsky District, Altai Krai, Russia. The population was 205 as of 2013. There are 3 streets.

== Geography ==
Pioner Truda is located near the Burla river, 40 km southwest of Khabary (the district's administrative centre) by road.
