= Novoandreyevka, Altai Krai =

Novoandreyevka Новоандреевка
- Village
- Location within Altai Krai Location within Russia
- Coordinates: 53°02′N 78°23′E
- Country: Russia
- Region: Altai Krai
- District: Burlinsky District
- Time zone: UTC+7:00

Novoandreyevka (Russian: Новоандреевка) is a rural locality (a selo) and the administrative center of Novoandreyevsky Selsoviet of Burlinsky District, Altai Krai, Russia. The population was 281 as of 2016. It was founded in 1905. There are 3 streets.

== Geography ==
Novoandreyevka is located 47 km south of Burla (the district's administrative centre) by road. Pokrovka is the nearest rural locality.

== Ethnicity ==
The village is inhabited by Ukrainians and others.
