= Novoalexeyevka =

Novoalexeyevka (Russian: Новоалексеевка) is the name of several rural localities in Russia:

- Novoalexeyevka, Zavitinsky District, Amur Oblast, a selo in Gorod Zavitinsk Urban Settlement of Zavitinsky District, Amur Oblast
- Novoalexeyevka, Ivanovsky District, Amur Oblast, a selo in Novoalexeyevsky Selsoviet of Ivanovsky District, Amur Oblast
