= Topolnoye (Khabarsky District) =

Topolnoye Топольное
- Village
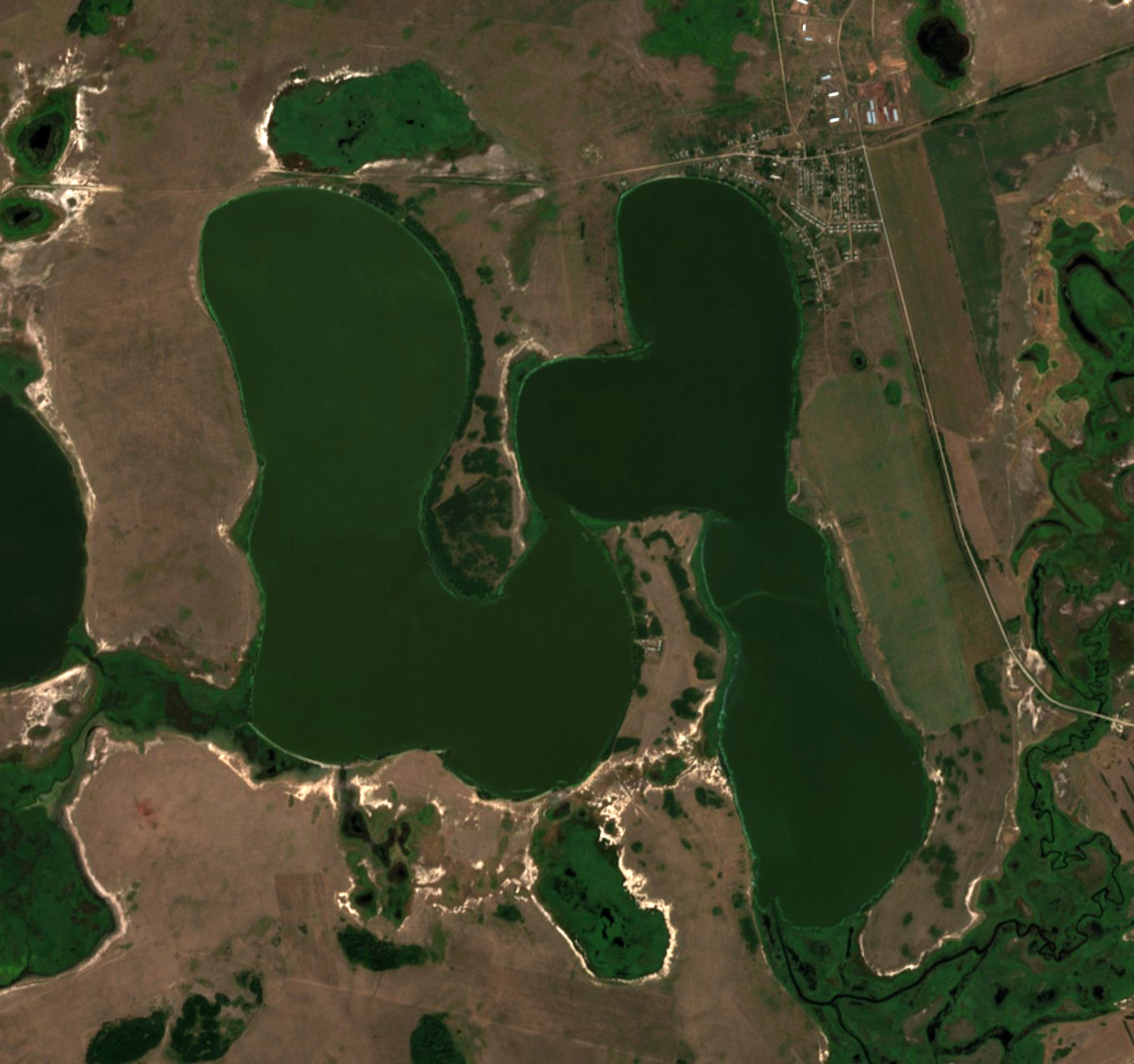
- Topolnoye on the northeastern shore of Topolnoye Lake Sentinel-2 picture

- Location within Altai Krai Location within Russia
- Coordinates: 53°32′46″N 78°53′02″E
- Country: Russia
- Region: Altai Krai
- District: Khabarsky District
- Municipal Council: Topolinsky
- Time zone: UTC+7:00
- Postcode: 658784

Topolnoye (Russian: Топольное) is a rural locality (a selo) and the administrative center of Topolinsky Municipal Council of Khabarsky District, Altai Krai, Russia. The population was 433 in 2016. The village was founded in 1776. There are 11 streets.

== Geography ==
Topolnoye is located by the shore of lake Topolnoye of the Burla river basin, 54 km west of Khabary (the district's administrative centre) by road. Lesnoye is the nearest rural locality.
