= Moskovka, Altai Krai =

Moskovka Московка
- Settlement
- Location within Altai Krai Location within Russia
- Coordinates: 53°26′N 79°47′E
- Country: Russia
- Region: Altai Krai
- District: Khabarsky District
- Time zone: UTC+7:00

Moskovka (Russian: Московка) is a rural locality (a settlement) in Michurinsky Selsoviet, Khabarsky District, Altai Krai, Russia. The population was 88 as of 2013. It was founded in 1914. There is 1 street.

== Geography ==
Moskovka is located 36 km southeast of Khabary (the district's administrative centre) by road. Michurinskoye is the nearest rural locality.
