= Peschanoye (Burla basin) =

Lake in Russia

- Песчаное
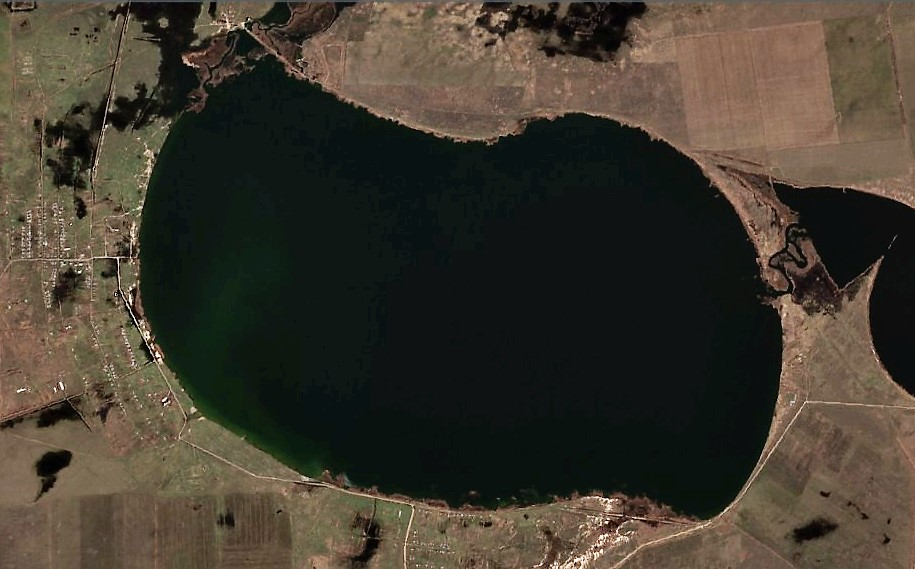
- Peschanoye lake Sentinel-2 image

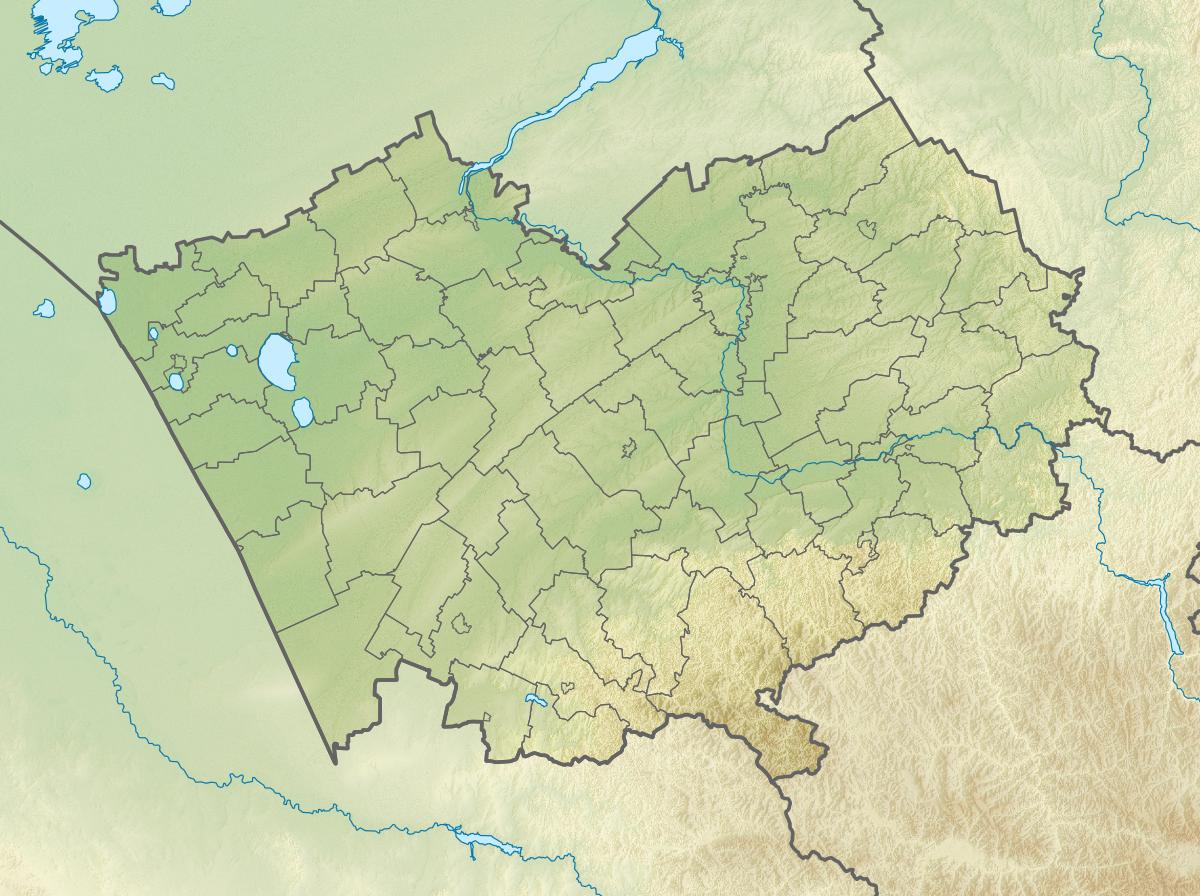
- Location within Altai Krai Location within Russia
- Location: Kulunda Plain; West Siberian Plain
- Coordinates: 53°24′31″N 78°34′46″E
- Type: fluvial lake
- Primary inflows: Burla
- Primary outflows: Burla
- Catchment area: 7,660 square kilometers (2,960 sq mi)
- Basin countries: Russia
- Max. length: 7.5 kilometers (4.7 mi)
- Max. width: 4.4 kilometers (2.7 mi)
- Surface area: 26.1 square kilometers (10.1 sq mi)
- Average depth: 1.6 meters (5 ft 3 in)
- Residence time: UTC+6
- Surface elevation: 114 meters (374 ft)
- Islands: None

Peschanoye (Russian: Песчаное) is a lake in Burlinsky District, Altai Krai, Russian Federation.

The lake is located at the northwestern end of the Krai, close to the border with Novosibirsk Oblast. The nearest inhabited places are Novopeschanoye, located by the western end, and Novoalexeyevka near the southern shore.

== Geography ==
Peschanoye lies in the Kulunda Plain, part of the West Siberian Plain. It has an elongated shape roughly oriented from east to west. The lakeshore is flanked in some stretches by steep, between 3 meters (9.8 ft) and 4 meters (13 ft) high, cliff-like banks. The Burla river flows into the lake from the east and out of it from the north. The water of the lake is fresh and its bottom is sandy.

Lake Khorosheye, also part of the Burla river basin, lies to the north and Khomutinoye close to the eastern end; both are connected with Peschanoye by channels. Pink lake Burlinskoye is located 26 kilometers (16 mi) to the south and Bolshoye Topolnoye 32 kilometers (20 mi) to the west.

== Flora and fauna ==
There are mostly cultivated fields close to the lake, as well as some steppe vegetation. The fish species in Peschanoye include sander, ide, bream, pike, burbot, perch and common roach, among others.

== See also ==
- List of lakes of Russia
