= Dolganka =

Dolganka Долганка
- Village
- Location within Altai Krai Location within Russia
- Coordinates: 54°07′N 81°02′E
- Country: Russia
- Region: Altai Krai
- District: Krutikhinsky District
- Time zone: UTC+7:00

Dolganka (Russian: Долганка) is a rural locality (a selo) and the administrative center of Dolgansky Selsoviet of Krutikhinsky District, Altai Krai, Russia. The population was 1,288 as of 2016. There are 13 streets. The village's street network consists of 12 streets and 1 alley.

== Geography ==
The village is located on the bank of the Burla River, 28 km north of Krutikha (the district's administrative centre) by road. Novokuzminka is the nearest rural locality.

== Ethnicity ==
The village is inhabited by Russians and others.
