= Khorosheye (Novosibirsk Oblast) =

Village in Russia

Khorosheye Хорошее
- Village
- Location within Novosibirsk Oblast Location within Russia
- Coordinates: 53°35′13″N 78°29′49″E
- Country: Russia
- Region: Novosibirsk Oblast
- District: Karasuksky District
- Village Council: Khoroshinsky Village Council
- Time zone: UTC+7:00
- Postcode: 632831

Khorosheye (Russian: Хорошее) is a rural locality (a selo). It is part of the Khoroshinsky village council of Karasuksky District, Novosibirsk Oblast, Russia.

Population 1,208 (2010 census); ; 1,472 (2002 census); .

== Geography ==
Khorosheye is located close to the Altai Krai border, by the northwestern shore of the lake of the same name.
