= Topolnoye, Uglovsky District, Altai Krai =

Topolnoye Топольное
- Selo
- Location within Altai Krai Location within Russia
- Coordinates: 50°56′N 80°06′E
- Country: Russia
- Region: Altai Krai
- District: Uglovsky District
- Time zone: UTC+7:00

Topolnoye (Russian: Топольное) is a rural locality (a selo) and the administrative center of Topolinsky Selsoviet, Uglovsky District, Altai Krai, Russia. The population was 833 as of 2013. It was founded in 1849. There are 4 streets.

== Geography ==
Topolnoye is located 71 km south of Uglovskoye (the district's administrative centre) by road. Topolinsky Leskhoz is the nearest rural locality. The selo borders Kazakhstan to its south.
