= Novoandreyevka, Amur Oblast =

Novoandreyevka Новоандреевка
- Selo
- Location within Amur Oblast Location within Russia
- Coordinates: 50°52′N 127°52′E
- Country: Russia
- Region: Amur Oblast
- District: Belogorsky District
- Time zone: UTC+9:00

Novoandreyevka (Russian: Новоандреевка) is a rural locality (a selo) in Velikoknyazevsky Selsoviet of Belogorsky District, Amur Oblast, Russia. The population was 119 as of 2018. There are 2 streets.

== Geography ==
Novoandreyevka is located on the left bank of the Zeya River, 56 km west of Belogorsk (the district's administrative centre) by road. Velikoknyazevka is the nearest rural locality.
