= Novoalexeyevka, Ivanovsky District, Amur Oblast =

Novoalexeyevka Новоалексеевка
- Selo
- Location within Amur Oblast Location within Russia
- Coordinates: 50°33′N 128°05′E
- Country: Russia
- Region: Amur Oblast
- District: Ivanovsky District
- Time zone: UTC+9:00

Novoalexeyevka (Russian: Новоалексеевка) is a rural locality (a selo) and the administrative center of Novoalexeyevsky Selsoviet of Ivanovsky District, Amur Oblast, Russia. The population was 627 as of 2018. There are 8 streets.

== Geography ==
Novoalexeyevka is located 28 km north of Ivanovka (the district's administrative centre) by road. Rakitnoye is the nearest rural locality.
