= Topolnoye (lake) =

Lake in Russia

- Топольное
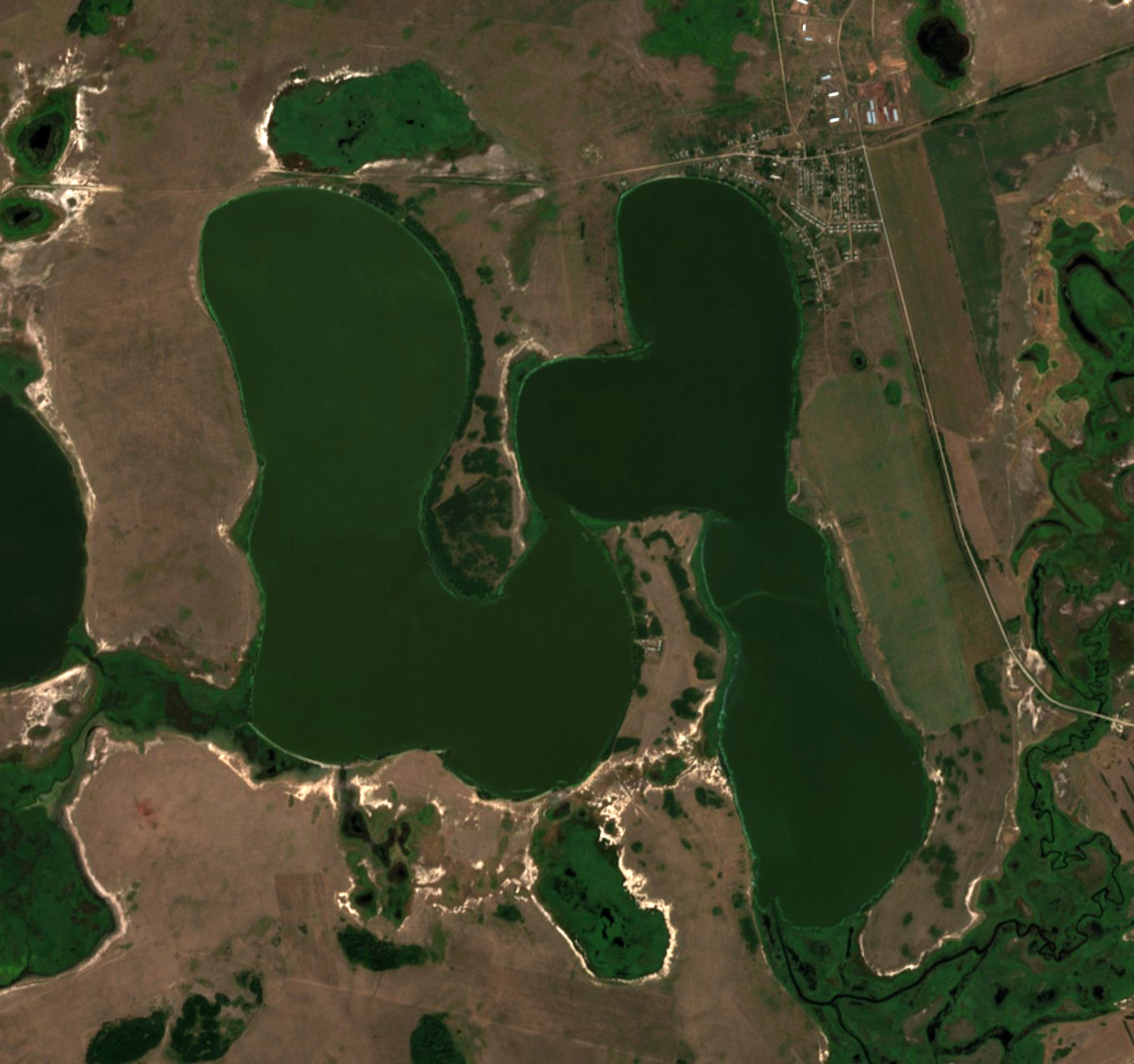
- Topolnoye lake Sentinel-2 image

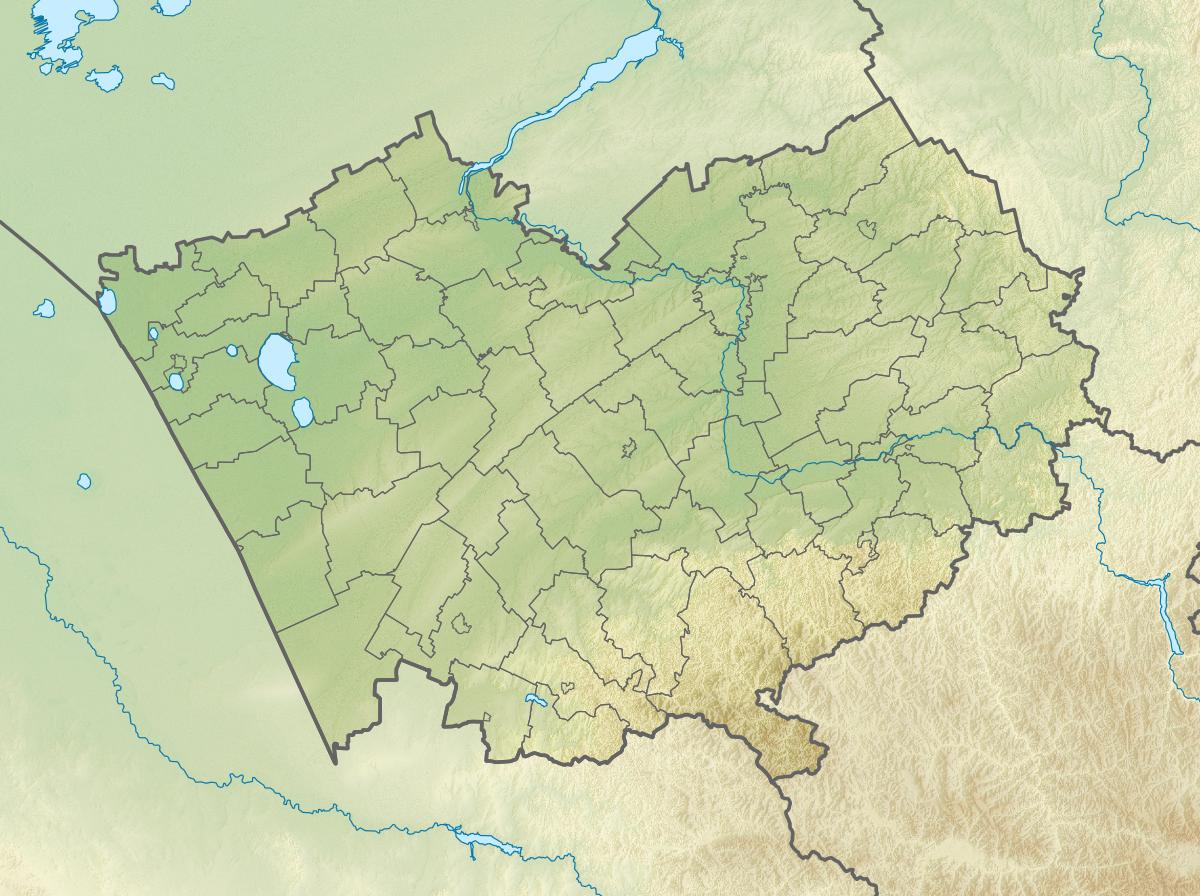
- Location within Altai Krai Location within Russia
- Location: Kulunda Plain; West Siberian Plain
- Coordinates: 53°30′52″N 78°50′33″E
- Type: fluvial lake
- Primary inflows: Burla
- Primary outflows: Burla
- Catchment area: 5,790 square kilometers (2,240 sq mi)
- Basin countries: Russia
- Max. length: 5.5 kilometers (3.4 mi)
- Max. width: 2.6 kilometers (1.6 mi)
- Surface area: 13.6 square kilometers (5.3 sq mi)
- Residence time: UTC+7
- Surface elevation: 115 meters (377 ft)
- Islands: None
- Settlements: Topolnoye

Topolnoye (Russian: Топольное), also known as "Little Topolnoye" (Russian: Малое Топольное) is a lake in Khabarsky District, Altai Krai, Russian Federation.

The lake is located at the northwestern limit of the Krai. Topolnoye town is located by the northeastern shore.

== Geography ==
Topolnoye lies in the Kulunda Plain, part of the West Siberian Plain. It has two elongated lobes roughly oriented from north to south, which are connected by a 300 meters (980 ft) wide sound. In the central part a peninsula jutting from the north and a landspit projecting from the south almost divide the lake in two. The lakeshore is gently sloping or flat and swampy. The Burla river flows through the lake and there is a dam regulating the water level.

Small lake Travnoye lies 0.8 kilometers (0.50 mi) to the west and lake Kabanye, also part of the Burla river basin, lies 4 kilometers (2.5 mi) to the southwest; both are connected with it by a channel. Lake Khorosheye lies 17 kilometers (11 mi) to the west of the western shore.

== Flora and fauna ==
There are reeds growing by the lakeshore and the water is fresh. Cultivated fields surround the lake, as well as areas of steppe vegetation. The fish species in the lake include crucian carp, perch, pike, chebak and Eurasian carp, among others.

== See also ==
- List of lakes of Russia
