= Topolnoye, Soloneshensky District, Altai Krai =

Topolnoye Топольное
- Village
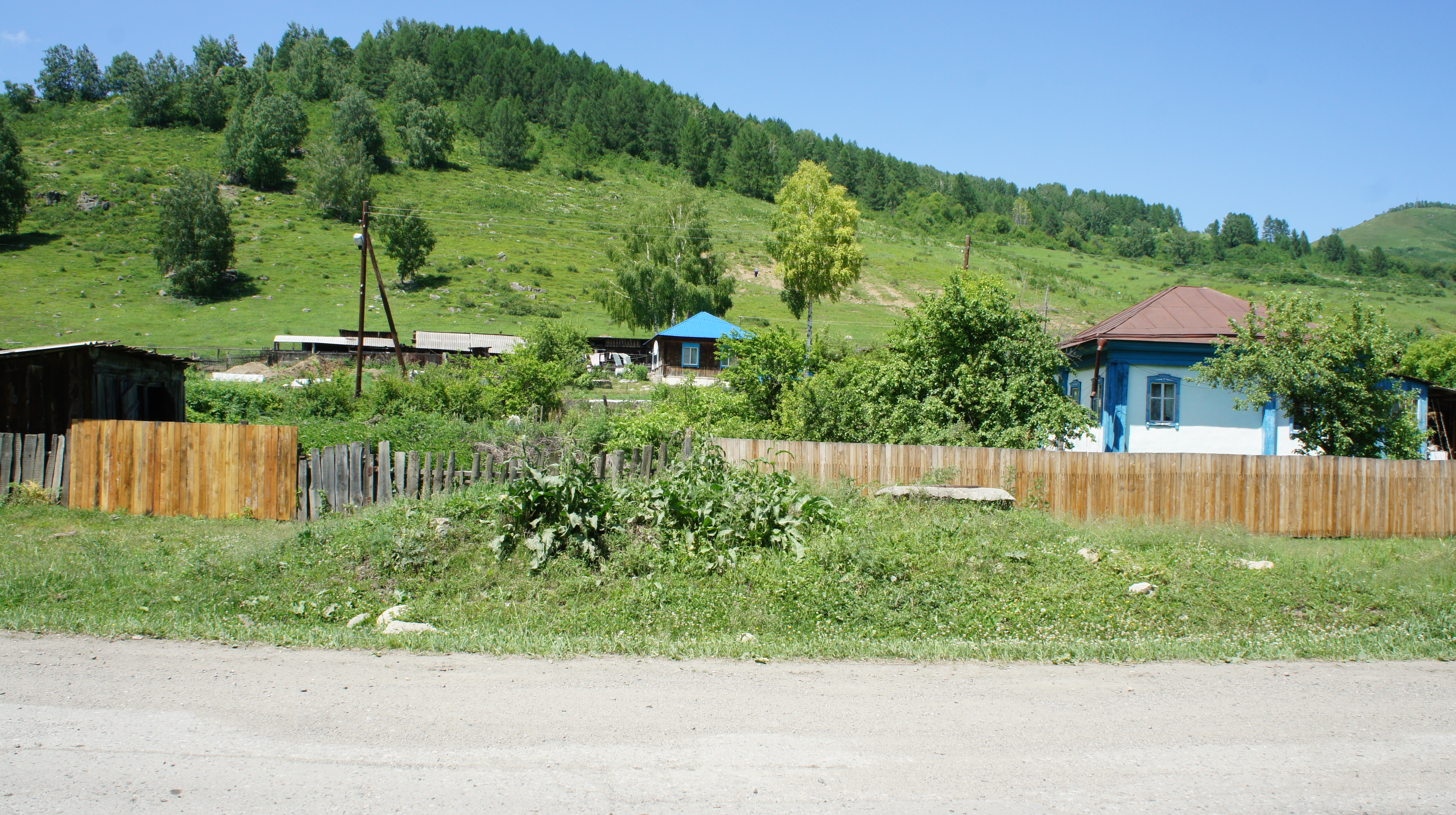

- Location within Altai Krai Location within Russia
- Coordinates: 51°30′N 84°28′E
- Country: Russia
- Region: Altai Krai
- District: Soloneshensky District
- Time zone: UTC+7:00

Topolnoye (Russian: Топольное) is a rural locality (a selo) and the administrative center of Topolinsky Selsoviet, Soloneshensky District, Altai Krai, Russia. The population was 991 as of 2013. There are 6 streets.

== Geography ==
Topolnoye is located 24 km southeast of Soloneshnoye (the district's administrative centre) by road.
