= Burla (river) =

River in Siberia, Russia

Burla Бурла / Борлы
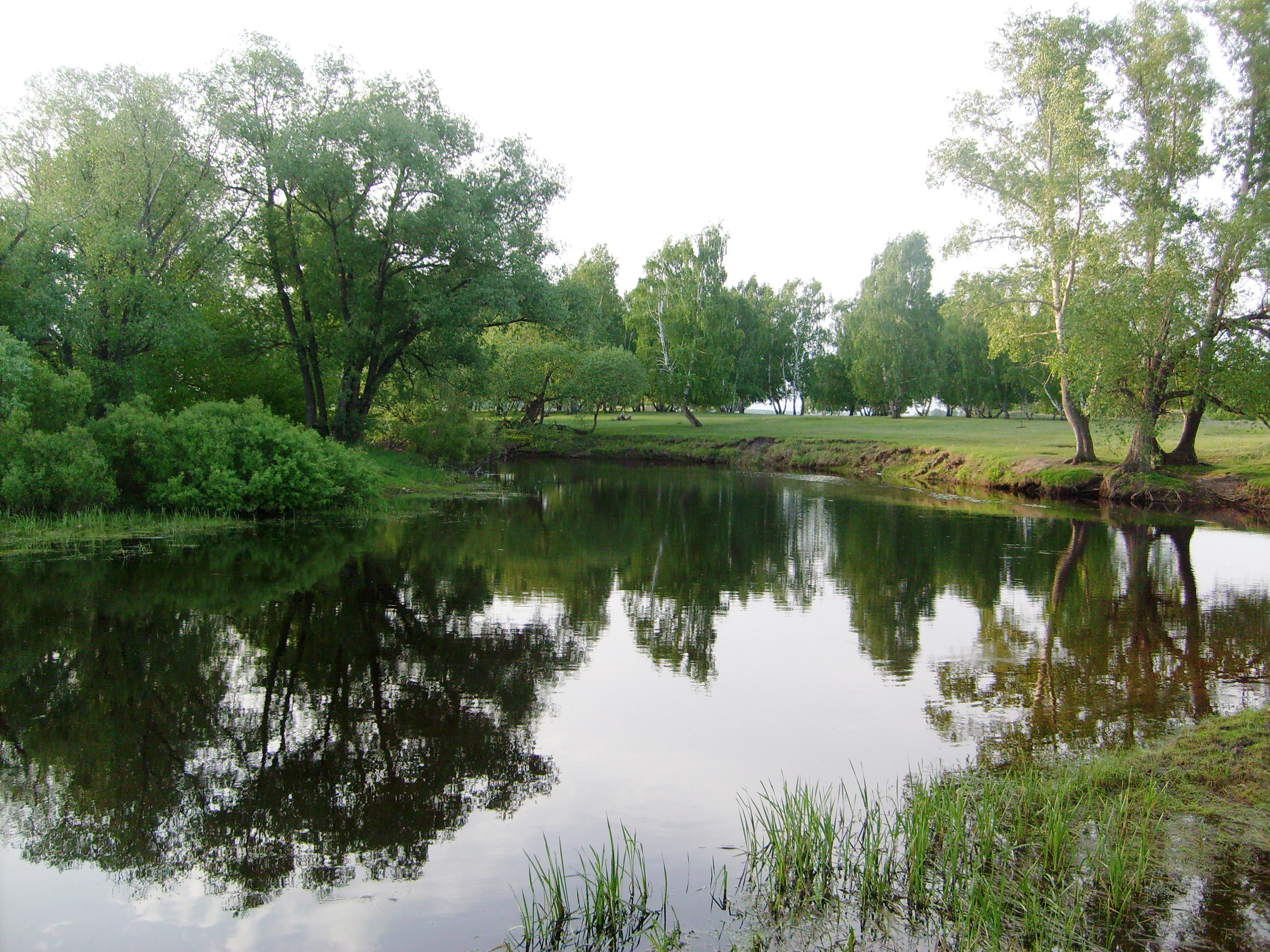
- Landscape of the upper course of the river in Khabarsky District

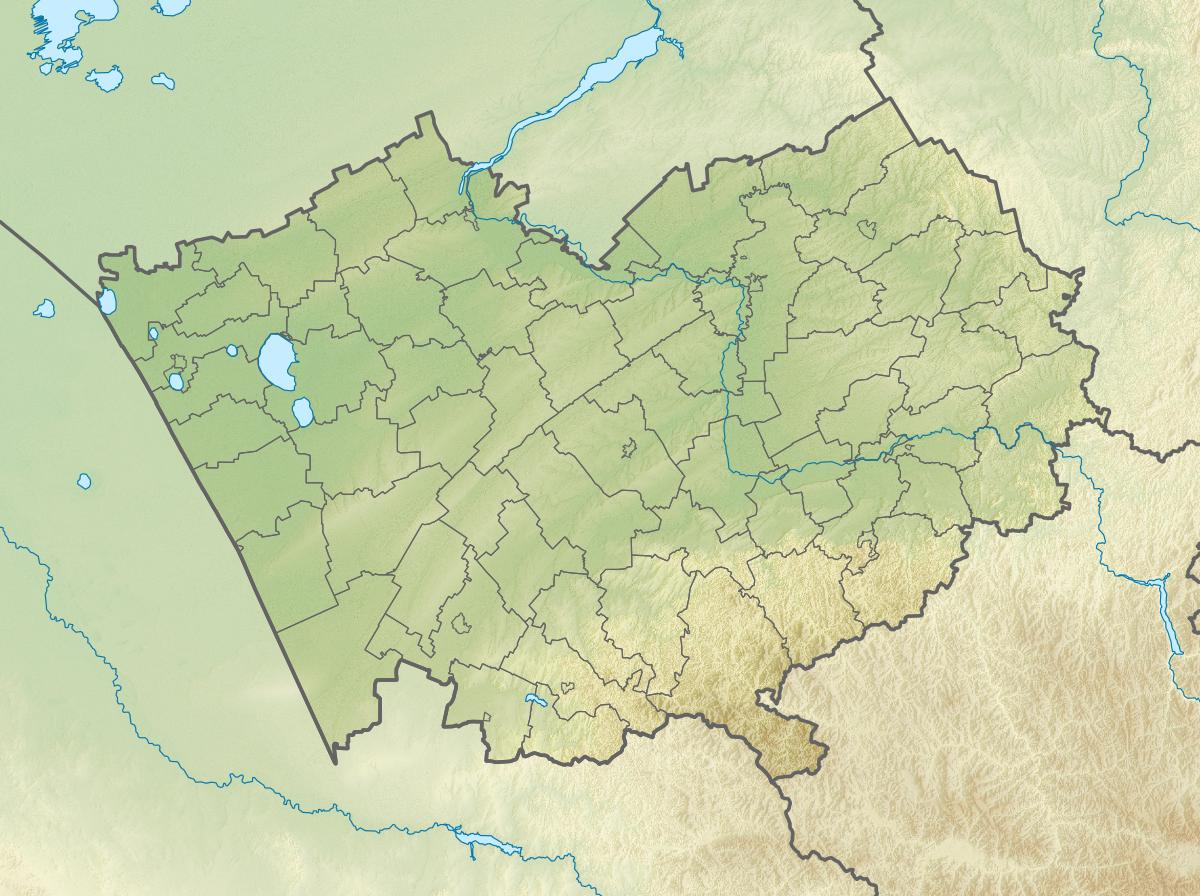
- Mouth location in Kazakhstan Burla (river) (Altai Krai)

Location
- Countries: Russia; Kazakhstan

Physical characteristics
- Source: Ob Plateau
  - coordinates: 54°01′26″N 80°53′58″E
  - elevation: 170 metres (560 ft)
- Mouth: Bolshoy Azhbulat
  - coordinates: 53°18′21″N 77°30′27″E
- Length: 489 km (304 mi)
- Basin size: 12,800 km^{2} (4,900 sq mi)
- Discharge
  - average: 3 m^{3}/s (110 cu ft/s)

The Burla (Russian: Бурла; Kazakh: Борлы, Borly) is a river in Russia and Kazakhstan. It is 489 kilometres (304 mi) long and has a catchment area of 12,800 square kilometres (4,900 sq mi).

The Burla river system is an endorheic watershed. In the Russian Federation the basin of the river is located mainly in Altai Krai, with a little section in Novosibirsk Oblast. The last stretch of its course is in the Pavlodar Region of Kazakhstan.

== Course ==
The sources of the Burla are in the Ob Plateau, 8 km (5.0 mi) to the northeast of Dolganka, Krutikhinsky District, and only 20 km (12 mi) from the banks of the Ob River. The river flows roughly southwestwards all along its course. As it descends into the Kulunda Plain its channel scatters, becoming almost interrupted in places. Further west along the steppe, the lower course of the Burla consists in channels between mostly shallow lakes such as Topolnoye, Khorosheye, Peschanoye and Khomutinoye. In dry years it ends in Lake Bolshoye Topolnoye, but in years of adequate rainfall the river flows into endorheic lake Bolshoy Azhbulat, beyond the Kazakhstan–Russia border.

There are numerous settlements near the river, such as Alexeyevka, Utyanka, Novoilyinka, Pioner Truda, Topolnoye, Ustyanka, Staropeschanoye, Novoalexeyevka, Novopeschanoye, Burla, Prityka, Mikhaylovka and Petrovka, among others.

=== Tributaries ===
The main tributaries of the Burla are the 32 km (20 mi) long Kurya (Курья) and the 55 km (34 mi) long Kurya (Aksenikha) (Курья (Аксениха)) from the left, as well as the 70 km (43 mi) long Chuman (Чуман) from the right. All the tributaries dry up in the summer, but the Chuman connects with the Karasuk river in high water years. There are numerous lakes in the Burla basin. The shallow areas of the river and neighboring wetlands freeze in the winter.

== See also ==
- List of rivers of Russia
