= Novoalexeyevka, Zavitinsky District, Amur Oblast =

Novoalexeyevka Новоалексеевка
- Selo
- Location within Amur Oblast Location within Russia
- Coordinates: 50°12′N 129°20′E
- Country: Russia
- Region: Amur Oblast
- District: Zavitinsky District
- Time zone: UTC+9:00

Novoalexeyevka (Russian: Новоалексеевка) is a rural locality (a selo) in Gorod Zavitinsk Urban Settlement of Zavitinsky District, Amur Oblast, Russia. The population was 111 as of 2018. There are 3 streets.

== Geography ==
Novoalexeyevka is located 17 km northwest of Zavitinsk (the district's administrative centre) by road. Tur is the nearest rural locality.
