= Khorosheye (lake) =

Lake in Russia

- Хорошее
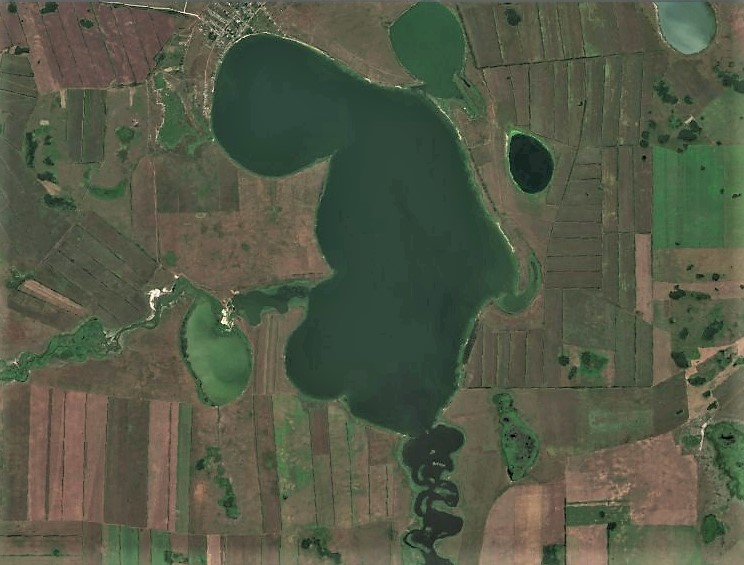
- Khorosheye lake Sentinel-2 image

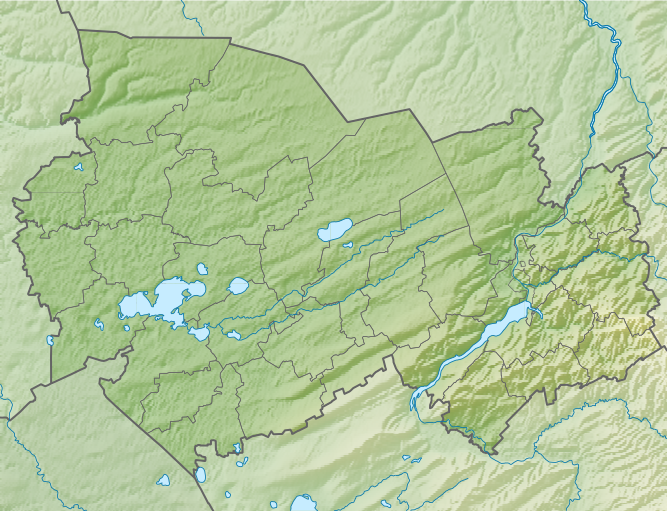
- Location within Novosibirsk Oblast Location within Russia
- Location: Kulunda Plain; West Siberian Plain
- Coordinates: 53°32′05″N 78°33′26″E
- Type: fluvial lake
- Primary inflows: Burla
- Primary outflows: Burla
- Catchment area: 8,030 square kilometers (3,100 sq mi)
- Basin countries: Russia
- Max. length: 15 kilometers (9.3 mi)
- Max. width: 4.4 kilometers (2.7 mi)
- Surface area: 30.3 square kilometers (11.7 sq mi)
- Max. depth: 5 meters (16 ft)
- Residence time: UTC+7
- Surface elevation: 113 meters (371 ft)
- Islands: None

Khorosheye (Russian: Хорошее) is a lake in Karasuksky District, Novosibirsk Oblast, and Burlinsky District, Altai Krai, Russian Federation.

The lake is located at the southwestern limit of the Oblast, with its southern tip at the border with Altai Krai. Khorosheye town is located by the northwestern shore.

== Geography ==
Khorosheye lies in the Kulunda Plain, part of the West Siberian Plain. It has an irregular shape roughly oriented from north to south. The lakeshore is flat with some large bays in the northwest and the south. The Burla river flows through the lake and there is a small dam at the outflow. The water of Khorosheye is fresh and its bottom is sandy.

Lake Peschanoye, also part of the Burla river basin, lies to the south and is connected with it by a channel. Lake Bolshoye Topolnoye lies 35 kilometers (22 mi) to the southwest, close to the Kazakhstan–Russia border.

== Flora and fauna ==
There are reeds by the lakeshore. Mostly cultivated fields surround the lake, as well as some areas of steppe vegetation with bushes. The fish species in the lake include chebak, sander, ide, bream, pike, crucian carp, Eurasian carp, perch and common bleak, among others. Peled and crayfish were released in the lake years ago.

== See also ==
- List of lakes of Russia
