= Khorosheye (Altai Krai) =

Khorosheye Хорошее
- Selo
- Location within Altai Krai Location within Russia
- Coordinates: 52°56′N 79°12′E
- Country: Russia
- Region: Altai Krai
- District: Tabunsky District
- Time zone: UTC+7:00

Khorosheye (Russian: Хорошее) is a rural locality (a selo) in Serebropolsky Selsoviet, Tabunsky District, Altai Krai, Russia. The population was 277 as of 2013. There are 2 streets.

== Geography ==
Khorosheye is located 40 km northeast of Tabuny (the district's administrative centre) by road. Serebropol is the nearest rural locality.
