= Bolshoye Topolnoye =

Lake in Burlinsky District, Altai Krai, Russian Federation

- Большое Топольное
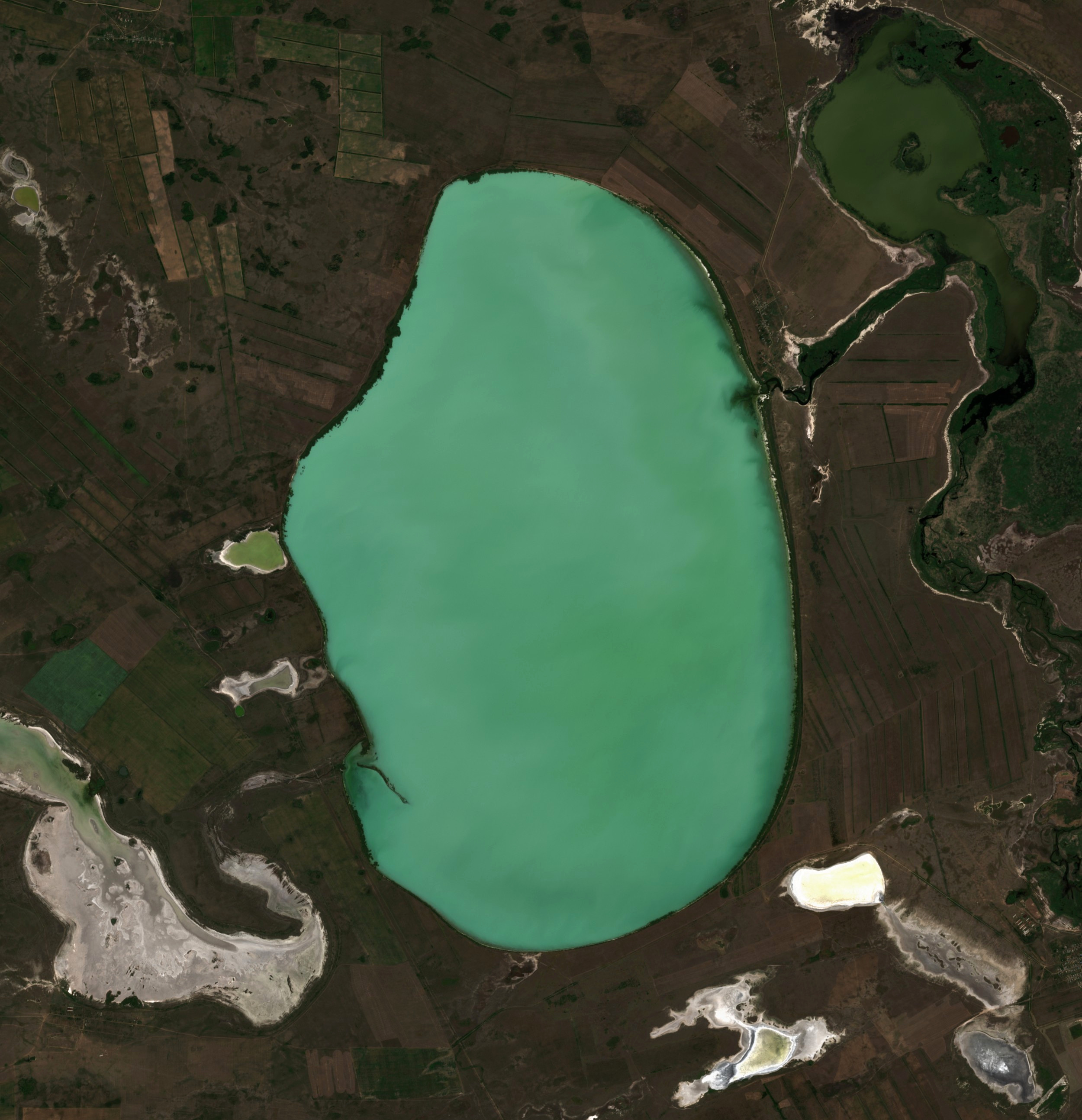
- Sentinel-2 picture of the lake

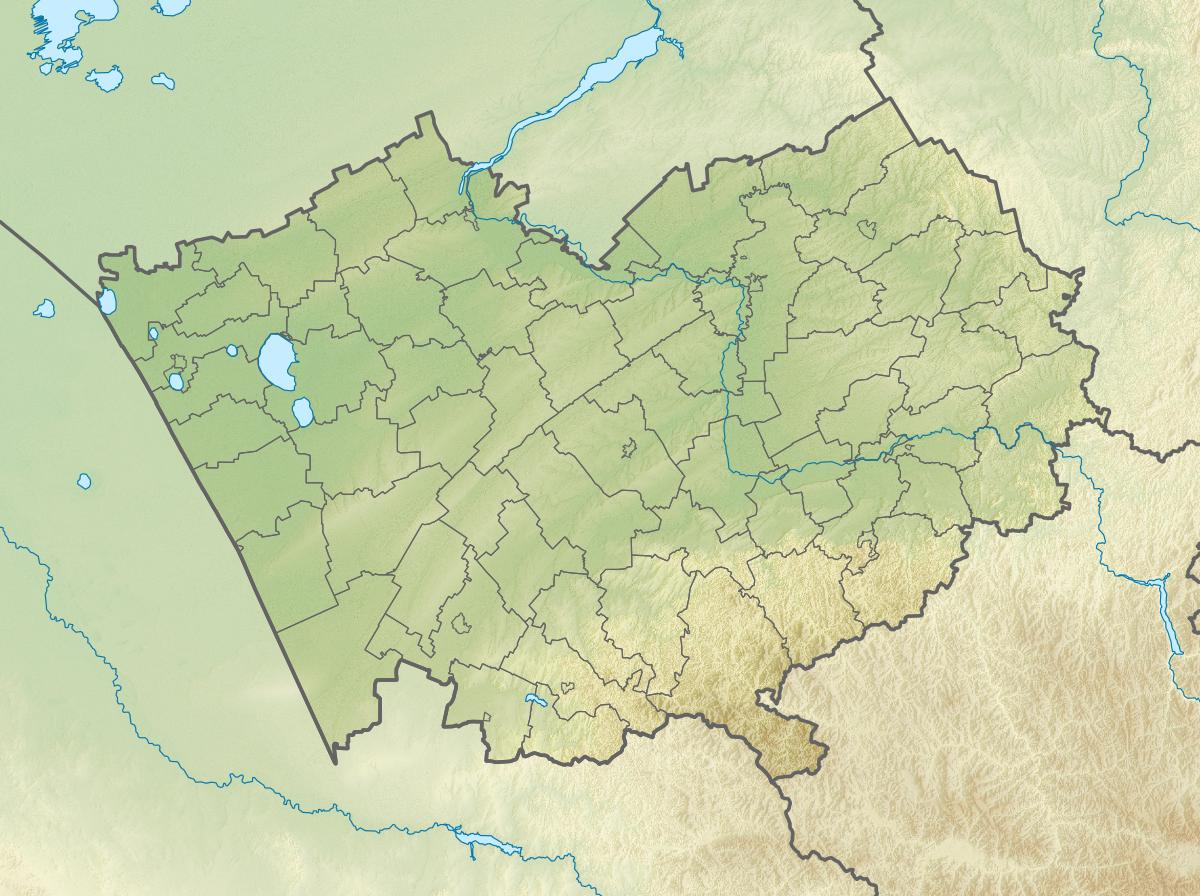
- Location within Altai Krai Location within Russia
- Location: West Siberian Plain
- Coordinates: 53°19′N 77°59′E
- Type: endorheic
- Primary inflows: Burla
- Primary outflows: Burla
- Catchment area: 10,700 square kilometers (4,100 sq mi)
- Basin countries: Russia
- Max. length: 13.4 kilometers (8.3 mi)
- Max. width: 8.2 kilometers (5.1 mi)
- Surface area: 76.6 square kilometers (29.6 sq mi)
- Average depth: 2 meters (6 ft 7 in)
- Max. depth: 2.5 meters (8 ft 2 in)
- Surface elevation: 99 meters (325 ft)
- Islands: None

Bolshoye Topolnoye (Russian: Большое Топольное), meaning "big poplar", is a lake in Burlinsky District, Altai Krai, Russian Federation.

The lake lies at the northwestern end of the Krai. A small part of the northwestern shore belongs to the SW corner of Novosibirsk Oblast. There are no settlements by the lake. The nearest inhabited places are Petrovka and Mikhailovka.

== Geography ==
Bolshoye Topolnoye is one of the largest lakes in Altai Krai. It has an oval shape and is located in the Kulunda Plain, southern part of the West Siberian Plain. Its southwestern shore is barely 0.2 kilometers (0.12 mi) to the east of the Kazakhstan–Russia border. Its waters are slightly saline. The Burla river flows into the northeastern area of the lake. The lakeshores are generally sloping, but there are as well marshy stretches. The water level of the lake is subject to variations. In snowy or rainy years, its surface area may reach 100 square kilometers (39 sq mi), but in periods of drought the lake may dry up becoming covered with grass and residual swamps. Towards the end of the nineteenth century such an extremely dry period lasted for roughly ten years, until the inflowing waters of the Burla filled the lake up again.

Lake Chagan straddles the international border 22 kilometers (14 mi) to the northwest, Burlinskoye lies 24 kilometers (15 mi) to the southeast, Topolnoye, also known as "Maloye Topolnoye", 55 kilometers (34 mi) to the ENE, Peschanoye 32 kilometers (20 mi) to the east, Astrodym 35 kilometers (22 mi) to the NNW, Krasnovishnevoye 80 kilometers (50 mi) to the northwest and lake Bolshoy Azhbulat is located nearby in Kazakhstan, 22 kilometers (14 mi) to the west. In years of adequate rainfall the Burla river flows out of the Bolshoye Topolnoye lake from a channel in the southwestern area of the lakeshore and reaches the final stretch of its course ending in its mouth in lake Bolshoy Azhbulat. However, in dry years there is no outflow and the Burla river ends in lake Bolshoye Topolnoye.

== Fauna ==
Among the fish species found in the waters of the lake rudd, whitefish, bream, pike, dace, perch, sterlet, roach, carp and common bleak are worth mentioning.

== See also ==
- List of lakes of Russia
