= Burla, Russia =

Burla Бурла
- Selo
- Interactive map of Burla
- Location of Burla Burla (Altai Krai)
- Coordinates: 53°19′57″N 78°19′52″E
- Country: Russia
- Federal subject: Altai Krai
- Administrative district: Burlinsky District
- SelsovietSelsoviet: Burlinsky Selsoviet
- Founded: 1905

Population (2010 Census)
  - Total: 4,304
  - Estimate (2021): 3,275 (−23.9%)

Administrative status
  - Capital of: Burlinsky District, Burlinsky Selsoviet

Municipal status
  - Municipal district: Burlinsky Municipal District
  - Rural settlement: Burlinsky Selsoviet Rural Settlement
  - Capital of: Burlinsky Municipal District, Burlinsky Selsoviet Rural Settlement
- Time zone: UTC+7 (MSK+4)
- Postal code: 658810
- OKTMO ID: 01606411101

Burla (Russian: Бурла) is a rural locality (a selo) and the administrative center of Burlinsky District of Altai Krai, Russia. Population: 4,304 (2010 census); 4,719 (2002 census); 4,881 (1989 Soviet census).

== Geography ==
Burla is located near the Burla river.
