= Burlinsky District =

Burlinsky District Бурлинский район (Russian)
- District
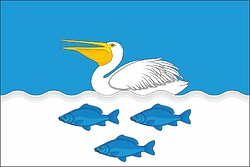
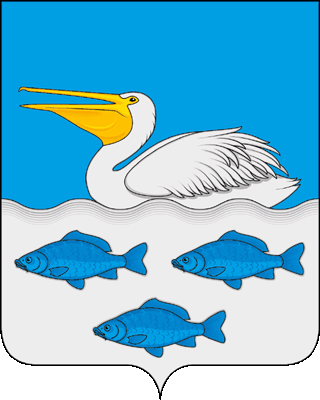
- Flag Coat of arms
- Location of Burlinsky District in Altai Krai
- Coordinates: 53°20′N 78°20′E
- Country: Russia
- Federal subject: Altai Krai
- Established: 1925
- Administrative center: Burla

Area
  - Total: 2,746 km^{2} (1,060 sq mi)

Population (2010 Census)
  - Total: 12,042
  - Density: 4.385/km^{2} (11.36/sq mi)
  - Urban: 0%
  - Rural: 100%

Administrative structure
  - Administrative divisions: 9 selsoviet
  - Inhabited localities: 25 rural localities

Municipal structure
  - Municipally incorporated as: Burlinsky Municipal District
  - Municipal divisions: 0 urban settlements, 9 rural settlements
- Time zone: UTC+7 (MSK+4)
- OKTMO ID: 01606000
- Website: http://admburla.ru

Burlinsky District (Russian: Бурли́нский райо́н) is an administrative and municipal district (raion), one of the fifty-nine in Altai Krai, Russia. It is located in the northwest of the krai. The area of the district is 2,746 square kilometers (1,060 sq mi). Its administrative center is the rural locality (a selo) of Burla. Population: 12,042 (2010 census); 15,005 (2002 census); 16,419 (1989 Soviet census). The population of Burla accounts for 35.7% of the district's total population.

== Geography ==
Lakes Bolshoye Topolnoye and Peschanoye, part of Khorosheye, as well as the Burla river, are located in the district.
