= Khabary, Khabarsky Selsoviet, Khabarsky District, Altai Krai =

Khabary Хабары
- Selo
- Interactive map of Khabary
- Location of Khabary Khabary (Altai Krai)
- Coordinates: 53°37′25″N 79°32′22″E
- Country: Russia
- Federal subject: Altai Krai
- Administrative district: Khabarsky District
- SelsovietSelsoviet: Khabarsky Selsoviet
- Founded: 1743

Population (2010 Census)
  - Total: 5,552
  - Estimate (2021): 4,963 (−10.6%)

Administrative status
  - Capital of: Khabarsky District, Khabarsky Selsoviet

Municipal status
  - Municipal district: Khabarsky Municipal District
  - Rural settlement: Khabarsky Selsoviet Rural Settlement
  - Capital of: Khabarsky Municipal District, Khabarsky Selsoviet Rural Settlement
- Time zone: UTC+7 (MSK+4)
- Postal code: 658780
- OKTMO ID: 01656493101

Khabary (Russian: Хабары) is a rural locality (a selo) and the administrative center of Khabarsky District of Altai Krai, Russia. Population: 5,552 (2010 census); 5,942 (2002 census); 5,843 (1989 Soviet census). As of 2016, population was 5,141 in 2016.

== Geography ==
Khabary is located 360 kilometres (220 mi) north-west from Barnaul and 142 kilometres (88 mi) from Kamen-na-Obi in the forest-steppe zone of the West Siberian Plain.
