= Khabarsky District =

Khabarsky District Хабарский район (Russian)
- District
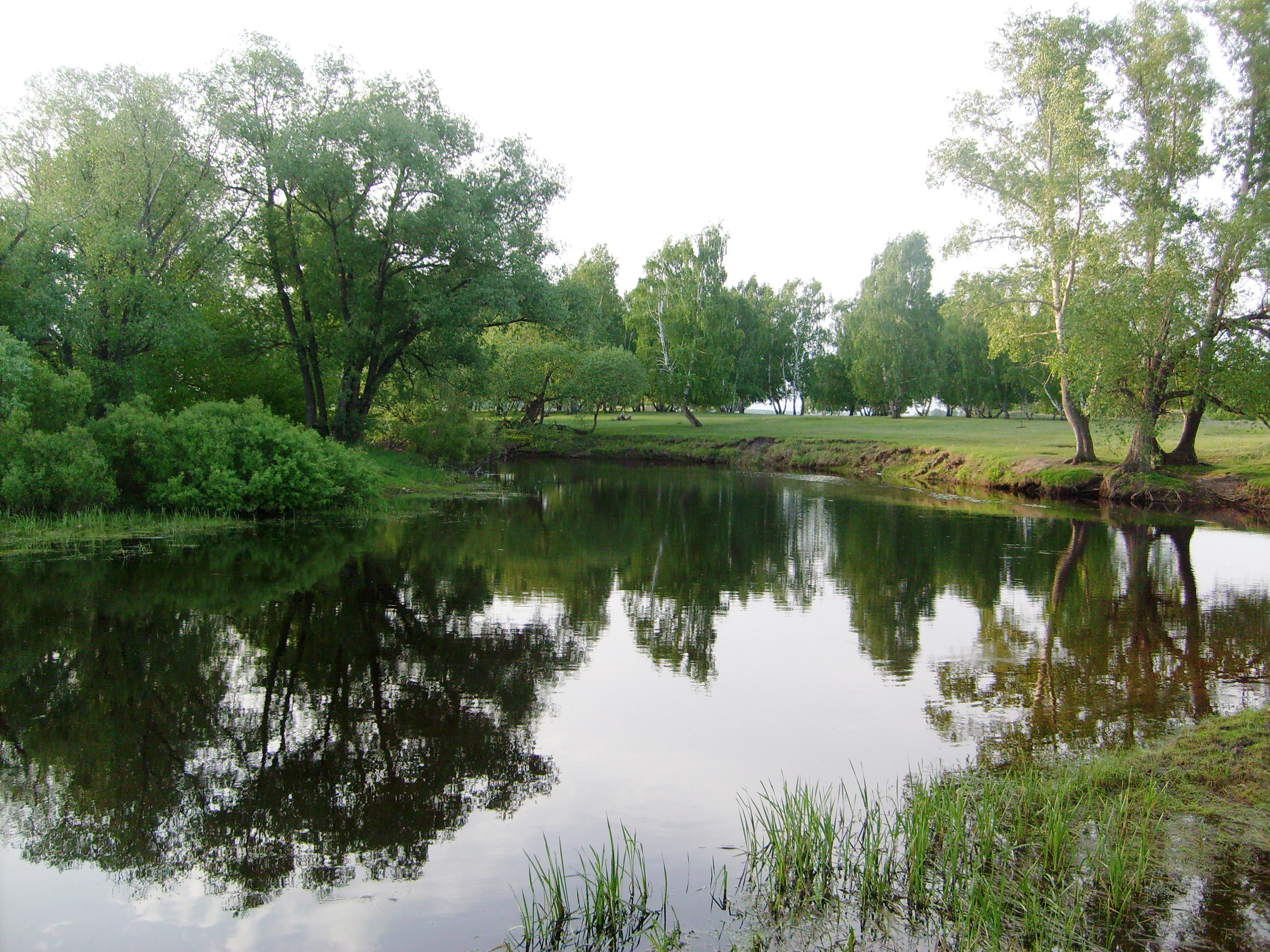
- Burla River, Khabarsky District

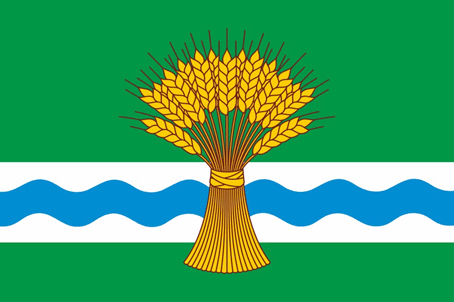
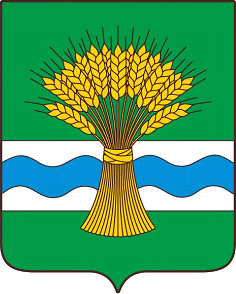
- Flag Coat of arms
- Location of Khabarsky District in Altai Krai
- Coordinates: 53°38′00″N 79°31′40″E
- Country: Russia
- Federal subject: Altai Krai
- Established: 1924
- Administrative center: Khabary

Area
  - Total: 2,800 km^{2} (1,100 sq mi)

Population (2010 Census)
  - Total: 16,431
  - Density: 5.9/km^{2} (15/sq mi)
  - Urban: 0%
  - Rural: 100%

Administrative structure
  - Administrative divisions: 10 selsoviet
  - Inhabited localities: 33 rural localities

Municipal structure
  - Municipally incorporated as: Khabarsky Municipal District
  - Municipal divisions: 0 urban settlements, 10 rural settlements
- Time zone: UTC+7 (MSK+4)
- OKTMO ID: 01656000
- Website: http://habary.net/

Khabarsky District (Russian: Хаба́рский райо́н) is an administrative and municipal district (raion), one of the fifty-nine in Altai Krai, Russia. It is located in the northwest of the krai. The area of the district is 2,800 square kilometers (1,100 sq mi). Its administrative center is the rural locality (a selo) of Khabary. Population: 16,431 (2010 census); 19,913 (2002 census); 29,498 (1989 Soviet census). The population of the administrative center accounts for 33.8% of the district's total population.

== Geography ==
Khabarsky District is located in the northwest region of Altai Krai, on flat terrain of the Kulunda Steppe of the West Siberian Plain. The meandering floodplain of the Burla river, with riverine lakes such as Topolnoye, runs across the middle of the district and through the administrative center of Khabary. Approximately 55% of the territory is arable land, and 20% is pasture.

The Burla river has its sources in the district. Along the river are small islands of pine forests, which are one of the tourist attractions of the area. The district is 240 km west of the regional city of Barnaul, and 2,600 km east of Moscow. The area measures 60 km (north-south), and 80 km (west-east); total area is 2,800 km2 (about 3% of Altai Krai).

The district is bordered on the north by Novosibirsk Oblast, on the east by Pankrushikhinsky District, on the south by Nemetsky National District, and on the west by Burlinsky District.

== Administrative divisions ==
Within the framework of administrative divisions, the district is divided into ten selsoviets: Khabarsky, Korotoyasky, Martovsky, Michurinsky, Novoilyinsky, Plyoso-Kuryinsky, Sverdlovsky, Topolinsky, Utyansky, and Zyatkovo-Rechensky.
