= List of rural localities in Bryansk Oblast =

Map of Russia with Bryansk Oblast highlighted

This is a list of rural localities in Bryansk Oblast. Bryansk Oblast (Russian: Бря́нская о́бласть, Bryanskaya oblast) is a federal subject of Russia (an oblast). Its administrative center is the city of Bryansk. As of the 2010 Census, its population was 1,278,217.

== Brasovsky District ==
Rural localities in Brasovsky District:

- Alexandrovskoye
- Brasovo
- Chayanka
- Chaykino
- Chistopolyansky
- Kamenka
- Krasnopolye
- Novoye
- Verkhneye

== Bryansky District ==
Rural localities in Bryansky District:

- Baldyzh
- Betovo
- Bolshaya Dubrava
- Dobrun
- Glinishchevo
- Kabalichi
- Khotylyovo
- Kurnyavtsevo
- Lesnoye
- Michurinsky
- Mirny
- Oktyabrskoye
- Opakhan
- Otradnoye
- Paltso
- Putyovka
- Sevryukovo
- Suponevo
- Yeliseyevichi

== Dubrovsky District ==
Rural localities in Dubrovsky District:

- Bobrovnya
- Davydchi
- Kutets
- Rekovichi

== Dyatkovsky District ==
Rural localities in Dyatkovsky District:

- Druzhba
- Klyonovsky
- Malygin
- Never
- Rodniki
- Vereshchovka

== Gordeyevsky District ==
Rural localities in Gordeyevsky District:

- Gordeyevka
- Mirny

== Karachevsky District ==
Rural localities in Karachevsky District:

- Alexeyeva
- Alymova
- Amozovsky
- Bavykina
- Berezovka
- Bocharki
- Dronova
- Dunayevsky
- Frolovka
- Frolovsky
- Karpovka
- Khokhlovka
- Kocherzhinka
- Lipovka
- Moiseyeva Gora
- Mokroye
- Morozovka
- Mylinka
- Olkhovka
- Osinovye Dvoriki
- Pechki
- Priyutovo
- Semyonovka
- Tsaryovo Zaymishche
- Vereshcha
- Yakovleva

== Kletnyansky District ==
Rural localities in Kletnyansky District:

- Alexeyevka
- Bobrov
- Bolotnya
- Boryatino
- Kochetov
- Lutna
- Michurino
- Mirny
- Muzhinovo
- Novozheyevka
- Roshcha

== Klimovsky District ==
Rural localities in Klimovsky District:

- Brovnichi
- Dobryn
- Luzhki
- Mitkovka
- Novy Ropsk
- Novy Varin
- Novye Yurkovichi
- Opteni
- Shamovka
- Stary Ropsk
- Zabrama

== Klintsovsky District ==
Rural localities in Klintsovsky District:

- Berezovka
- Chemerna
- Gulyovka
- Korzhovka-Golubovka
- Malaya Topal
- Olkhovka
- Polyana
- Smolevichi
- Sosnovka
- Zasnovye

== Klintsy ==
Rural localities in Klintsy urban okrug:

- Ardon
- Zaymishche

== Komarichsky District ==
Rural localities in Komarichsky District:

- Arkino
- Babinets
- Berezovets
- Gorki
- Kokino
- Radogoshch
- Vasilyok
- Zarechnaya

== Krasnogorsky District ==
Rural localities in Krasnogorsky District:

- Morozovka
- Perelazy
- Uvelye

== Mglinsky District ==
Rural localities in Mglinsky District:

- Belovodka
- Chernovitsa
- Divovka
- Stepnoy

== Navlinsky District ==
Rural localities in Navlinsky District:

- Byakovo
- Cheryomushki
- Druzhnaya
- Partizanskoye
- Peschany
- Privolye
- Sadovy
- Sosnovskoye

== Novozybkovsky District ==
Rural localities in Novozybkovsky District:

- Snovskoye
- Starye Bobovichi

== Pochepsky District ==
Rural localities in Pochepsky District:

- Baklan
- Bumazhnaya Fabrika
- Dmitrovo
- Dubrava
- Gromyki
- Gubostovo
- Kozlovka
- Krasnomayskaya
- Lapino
- Moskovsky
- Nelzhichi
- Oktyabrsky
- Ozarenny
- Pervomayskoye
- Pervomaysky
- Pochinok
- Progress
- Rechitsa
- Rogovo
- Setolovo
- Tuboltsy
- Vesenny
- Vialky
- Zarechye
- Zhitnya (settlement)
- Zhitnya (village)

== Pogarsky District ==
Rural localities in Pogarsky District:

- Borshchovo
- Chausy
- Chaykino
- Chekhovka
- Goritsy
- Lobki
- Zarechnoye

== Rognedinsky District ==
Rural localities in Rognedinsky District:

- Shokhovka
- Soglasiye

== Sevsky District ==
Rural localities in Sevsky District:

- Dobrun
- Knyaginino
- Pervomayskoye
- Podlesny
- Podyvotye
- Pushkino
- Trudovik
- Yasnoye Solntse
- Zarechny
- Zaytsevsky
- Zemledelets

== Starodubsky District ==
Rural localities in Starodubsky District:

- Chubkovichi
- Desyatukha
- Dneprovka
- Gartsevo
- Gorislovo
- Gridenki
- Khomutovka
- Kurkovichi
- Levenka
- Luzhki
- Malinovka
- Melensk
- Merenovka
- Nizhneye
- Novomlynka
- Ostroglyadovo
- Ozyornoye
- Pecheniki
- Sadovaya
- Stepok
- Voronok
- Yelionka
- Zhecha

== Suzemsky District ==
Rural localities in Suzemsky District:

- Berezovka
- Dobrun
- Negino
- Nerussa
- Pavlovichi
- Zyornovo

== Trubchevsky District ==
Rural localities in Trubchevsky District:

- Krasnoye
- Kvetun
- Subbotovo

== Unechsky District ==
Rural localities in Unechsky District:

- Berezina
- Dubrovka
- Luzhki
- Olkhovy
- Ozyorny
- Staraya Guta
- Vishnyovoye
- Zhudilovo

== Vygonichsky District ==
Rural localities in Vygonichsky District:

- Beryozovaya Roshcha
- Desnyansky
- Kokino
- Sadovy

== Zhiryatinsky District ==
Rural localities in Zhiryatinsky District:

- Yeliseyevichi
- Zarechnaya
- Zhiryatino

== Zhukovsky District ==
Rural localities in Zhukovsky District:

- Berezhki
- Berezovka
- Ovstug
- Tsvetniki
- Vshchizh

== Zlynkovsky District ==
Rural localities in Zlynkovsky District:

- Dobrodeyevka
- Guta
- Muravinka
- Sennoye
- Zelyonaya Roshcha

== See also ==
- Lists of rural localities in Russia
