= Bobrovnya =

Bobrovnya Бобровня
- Village
- Location within Bryansk Oblast Location within Russia
- Coordinates: 53°30′N 33°27′E
- Country: Russia
- Region: Bryansk Oblast
- District: Dubrovsky District
- Time zone: UTC+3:00

Bobrovnya (Russian: Бобровня) is a rural locality (a village) in Dubrovsky District, Bryansk Oblast, Russia. The population was 6 as of 2010. There is 1 street.

== Geography ==
Bobrovnya is located 32 km south of Dubrovka (the district's administrative centre) by road. Ruchey is the nearest rural locality.
