= Vesenny =

Vesenny (Russian: Весе́нний; masculine), Vesennyaya (Весе́нняя; feminine), or Vesenneye (Весе́ннее; neuter) is the name of several inhabited localities in Russia.

Urban localities

- Vesenny, Chukotka Autonomous Okrug, an urban-type settlement in Bilibinsky District of Chukotka Autonomous Okrug

Rural localities

- Vesenny, Bryansk Oblast, a settlement in Krasnorogsky Selsoviet of Pochepsky District of Bryansk Oblast
- Vesenny, Orenburg Oblast, a settlement in Vesenny Selsoviet of Orenburgsky District of Orenburg Oblast
- Vesenny, Rostov Oblast, a settlement in Krasnovskoye Rural Settlement of Tarasovsky District of Rostov Oblast
- Vesenneye, a selo in Vesennensky Selsoviet of Ust-Abakansky District of the Republic of Khakassia
