= Davydchi =

Davydchi Давыдчи
- Village
- Location within Bryansk Oblast Location within Russia
- Coordinates: 53°40′N 33°29′E
- Country: Russia
- Region: Bryansk Oblast
- District: Dubrovsky District
- Time zone: UTC+3:00

Davydchi (Russian: Давыдчи) is a rural locality (a village) in Dubrovsky District, Bryansk Oblast, Russia. The population was 435 as of 2010. There are 6 streets.

== Geography ==
Davydchi is located 3 km southwest of Dubrovka (the district's administrative centre) by road. Ponizovka is the nearest rural locality.
