= Yeliseyevichi =

Yeliseyevichi Елисеевичи
- Village
- Location within Bryansk Oblast Location within Russia
- Coordinates: 53°08′N 33°38′E
- Country: Russia
- Region: Bryansk Oblast
- District: Zhiryatinsky District
- Time zone: UTC+3:00

Yeliseyevichi (Russian: Елисеевичи) is a rural locality (a village) in Zhiryatinsky District, Bryansk Oblast, Russia. The population was 24 as of 2010. There are 2 streets.

== Geography ==
Yeliseyevichi is located 14 km southwest of Zhiryatino (the district's administrative centre) by road. Goritsy is the nearest rural locality.
