= Kutets =

Kutets Кутец
- Village
- Location within Bryansk Oblast Location within Russia
- Coordinates: 53°44′N 33°18′E
- Country: Russia
- Region: Bryansk Oblast
- District: Dubrovsky District
- Time zone: UTC+3:00

Kutets (Russian: Кутец) is a rural locality (a village) in Dubrovsky District, Bryansk Oblast, Russia. The population was 45 as of 2010. There is 1 street.

== Geography ==
Kutets is located 17 km northwest of Dubrovka (the district's administrative centre) by road. Bolshaya Ostrovnya is the nearest rural locality.
