= Zarechnaya, Zhiryatinsky District, Bryansk Oblast =

Zarechnaya Заречная
- Village
- Location within Bryansk Oblast Location within Russia
- Coordinates: 53°14′N 33°49′E
- Country: Russia
- Region: Bryansk Oblast
- District: Zhiryatinsky District
- Time zone: UTC+3:00

Zarechnaya (Russian: Заречная) is a rural locality (a village) in Zhiryatinsky District, Bryansk Oblast, Russia. The population was 115 as of 2010. There are 2 streets.

== Geography ==
Zarechnaya is located 9 km northeast of Zhiryatino (the district's administrative centre) by road. Knyazhichi is the nearest rural locality.
