= Rekovichi =

Rekovichi Рековичи
- Station
- Location within Bryansk Oblast Location within Russia
- Coordinates: 53°38′N 33°36′E
- Country: Russia
- Region: Bryansk Oblast
- District: Dubrovsky District
- Time zone: UTC+3:00

Rekovichi (Russian: Рековичи) is a rural locality (a station) in Dubrovsky District, Bryansk Oblast, Russia. The population was 8 as of 2010. There is 1 street.

== Geography ==
Rekovichi is located 11 km southeast of Dubrovka (the district's administrative centre) by road. Rekovichi is the nearest rural locality.
