= Verkhnyaya Dobrinka =

Verkhnyaya Dobrinka Верхняя Добринка
- Selo
- Location within Volgograd Oblast Location within Russia
- Coordinates: 50°46′N 45°02′E
- Country: Russia
- Region: Volgograd Oblast
- District: Zhirnovsky District
- Time zone: UTC+4:00

Verkhnyaya Dobrinka (Russian: Ве́рхняя До́бринка) is a rural locality (a selo) and the administrative center of Verkhnedobrinskoye Rural Settlement, Zhirnovsky District, Volgograd Oblast, Russia. The population was 716 as of 2010. There are 21 streets.

== Geography ==
Verkhnyaya Dobrinka is located 71 km southeast of Zhirnovsk (the district's administrative centre) by road. Vishnyovoye is the nearest rural locality.
