= Zarechnaya, Komarichsky District, Bryansk Oblast =

Zarechnaya Заречная
- Village
- Location within Bryansk Oblast Location within Russia
- Coordinates: 52°25′N 34°43′E
- Country: Russia
- Region: Bryansk Oblast
- District: Komarichsky District
- Time zone: UTC+3:00

Zarechnaya (Russian: Заречная) is a rural locality (a village) in Komarichsky District, Bryansk Oblast, Russia. The population was 206 as of 2010. There are 7 streets.

== Geography ==
Zarechnaya is located 6 km west of Komarichi (the district's administrative centre) by road. Bocharovo is the nearest rural locality.
