= Rogovo, Bryansk Oblast =

Rogovo Рогово
- Selo
- Location within Bryansk Oblast Location within Russia
- Coordinates: 52°51′N 33°22′E
- Country: Russia
- Region: Bryansk Oblast
- District: Pochepsky District
- Time zone: UTC+3:00

Rogovo (Russian: Рогово) is a rural locality (a selo) in Pochepsky District, Bryansk Oblast, Russia. In the 19th century, the village was part of Kotlyakovskaya volost, Mglinsky Uyezd, Chernigov Governorate. The population was 272 as of 2010. There are 9 streets.

== Geography ==
Rogovo is located 12 km southwest of Pochep (the district's administrative centre) by road. Bobrovnik is the nearest rural locality.
