= Bolotnya =

Bolotnya Болотня
- Village
- Location within Bryansk Oblast Location within Russia
- Coordinates: 53°18′N 32°54′E
- Country: Russia
- Region: Bryansk Oblast
- District: Kletnyansky District
- Time zone: UTC+3:00

Bolotnya (Russian: Болотня) is a rural locality (a village) in Kletnyansky District, Bryansk Oblast, Russia. The population was 224 as of 2010. There are 4 streets.

== Geography ==
Bolotnya is located 30 km southwest of Kletnya (the district's administrative centre) by road. Solovyanovka is the nearest rural locality.
