= Betovo =

Betovo Бетово
- Village
- Location within Bryansk Oblast Location within Russia
- Coordinates: 53°20′N 34°00′E
- Country: Russia
- Region: Bryansk Oblast
- District: Bryansky District
- Time zone: UTC+3:00

Betovo (Russian: Бетово) is a rural locality (a village) in Bryansky District, Bryansk Oblast, Russia. The population was 556 as of 2013. There are 6 streets.

== Geography ==
Betovo is located 9 km northwest of Glinishchevo (the district's administrative centre) by road. Gorodets is the nearest rural locality.
