= Vasilyok =

Vasilyok Василёк
- Settlement
- Location within Bryansk Oblast Location within Russia
- Coordinates: 52°12′N 34°40′E
- Country: Russia
- Region: Bryansk Oblast
- District: Komarichsky District
- Time zone: UTC+3:00

Vasilyok (Russian: Василёк) is a rural locality (a settlement) in Komarichsky District, Bryansk Oblast, Russia. The population was 55 as of 2010. There is 1 street.

== Geography ==
Vasilyok is located 30 km south of Komarichi (the district's administrative centre) by road. Trostenchik is the nearest rural locality.
