= Pervomayskoye, Pochepsky District, Bryansk Oblast =

Pervomayskoye Первомайское
- Selo
- Location within Bryansk Oblast Location within Russia
- Coordinates: 52°53′N 33°36′E
- Country: Russia
- Region: Bryansk Oblast
- District: Pochepsky District
- Time zone: UTC+3:00

Pervomayskoye (Russian: Первомайское), known before 1940 as P'yany Rog (Russian: Пьяный Рог), is a rural locality (selo) and the administrative center of Pervomayskoye Rural Settlement, Pochepsky District, Bryansk Oblast, Russia. In the 19th century the village was part of Krasnorogskaya volost, Mglinsky Uyezd, Chernigov Governorate. The population was 881 as of 2010. There are 18 streets.

== Geography ==
Pervomayskoye is located 12 km southeast of Pochep (the district's administrative centre) by road. Popovka is the nearest rural locality.
