= Divovka =

Divovka Дивовка
- Selo
- Location within Bryansk Oblast Location within Russia
- Coordinates: 53°02′N 33°02′E
- Country: Russia
- Region: Bryansk Oblast
- District: Mglinsky District
- Time zone: UTC+3:00

Divovka (Russian: Дивовка) is a rural locality (a selo) in Mglinsky District, Bryansk Oblast, Russia. In the 19th century the village was part of Romanovskaya volost, Mglinsky Uyezd, Chernigov Governorate. The population was 406 as of 2010. There are 4 streets.

== Geography ==
Divovka is located 15 km southeast of Mglin (the district's administrative centre) by road. Korunsky is the nearest rural locality.
