= Muzhinovo =

Muzhinovo Мужиново
- Selo
- Location within Bryansk Oblast Location within Russia
- Coordinates: 53°15′N 33°15′E
- Country: Russia
- Region: Bryansk Oblast
- District: Kletnyansky District
- Time zone: UTC+3:00

Muzhinovo (Russian: Мужиново) is a rural locality (a selo) and the administrative center of Muzhinovskoye Rural Settlement, Kletnyansky District, Bryansk Oblast, Russia. The population was 393 as of 2010. There are 4 streets.

== Geography ==
Muzhinovo is located 17 km south of Kletnya (the district's administrative centre) by road. Olshanka is the nearest rural locality.
