= Roshcha, Kletnyansky District, Bryansk Oblast =

Roshcha Роща
- Village
- Location within Bryansk Oblast Location within Russia
- Coordinates: 53°28′N 33°10′E
- Country: Russia
- Region: Bryansk Oblast
- District: Kletnyansky District
- Time zone: UTC+3:00

Roshcha (Russian: Роща) is a rural locality (a village) in Kletnyansky District, Bryansk Oblast, Russia. The population was 34 as of 2010. There are 2 streets.

== Geography ==
Roshcha is located 11 km north of Kletnya (the district's administrative centre) by road. Kozenkovka is the nearest rural locality.
