= Sevryukovo =

Sevryukovo Севрюково
- Village
- Location within Bryansk Oblast Location within Russia
- Coordinates: 53°17′N 34°03′E
- Country: Russia
- Region: Bryansk Oblast
- District: Bryansky District
- Time zone: UTC+3:00

Sevryukovo (Russian: Севрюково) is a rural locality (a village) in Bryansky District, Bryansk Oblast, Russia. The population was 16 as of 2013. There is 1 street.

== Geography ==
Sevryukovo is located 3 km southwest of Glinishchevo (the district's administrative centre) by road. Baldyzh is the nearest rural locality.
