= Mirny, Bryansky District, Bryansk Oblast =

Mirny Мирный
- Settlement
- Location within Bryansk Oblast Location within Russia
- Coordinates: 53°19′N 34°49′E
- Country: Russia
- Region: Bryansk Oblast
- District: Bryansky District
- Time zone: UTC+3:00

Mirny (Russian: Мирный) is a rural locality (a settlement) in Bryansky District, Bryansk Oblast, Russia. The population was 213 as of 2010. There are 6 streets.

== Geography ==
Mirny is located 71 km east of Glinishchevo (the district's administrative centre) by road. Zhurinichi and Zaytsev Dvor are the nearest rural localities.
