= Otradnoye, Bryansk Oblast =

Otradnoye Отрадное
- Selo
- Location within Bryansk Oblast Location within Russia
- Coordinates: 53°19′N 34°10′E
- Country: Russia
- Region: Bryansk Oblast
- District: Bryansky District
- Time zone: UTC+3:00

Otradnoye (Russian: Отрадное) is a rural locality (a village) in Bryansky District, Bryansk Oblast, Russia. The population was 1,879 as of 2010. There are 73 streets.

== Geography ==
Otradnoye is located 10 km northeast of Glinishchevo (the district's administrative centre) by road. Bordovichi is the nearest rural locality.
