= Yeliseyevichi, Bryansky District, Bryansk Oblast =

Yeliseyevichi Елисеевичи
- Selo
- Location within Bryansk Oblast Location within Russia
- Coordinates: 53°14′N 34°11′E
- Country: Russia
- Region: Bryansk Oblast
- District: Bryansky District
- Time zone: UTC+3:00

Yeliseyevichi (Russian: Елисеевичи) is a rural locality (a selo) in Bryansky District, Bryansk Oblast, Russia. The population was 35 as of 2013.

== Geography ==
Yeliseyevichi is located 15 km southeast of Glinishchevo (the district's administrative centre) by road. Oktyabrskoye is the nearest rural locality.
