= Partizanskoye, Bryansk Oblast =

Partizanskoye Партизанское
- Selo
- Location within Bryansk Oblast Location within Russia
- Coordinates: 52°46′N 34°22′E
- Country: Russia
- Region: Bryansk Oblast
- District: Navlinsky District
- Time zone: UTC+3:00

Partizanskoye (Russian: Партизанское) is a rural locality (a selo) in Navlinsky District, Bryansk Oblast, Russia. The population was 82 as of 2010.

== Geography ==
Partizanskoye is located 13 km southwest of Navlya (the district's administrative centre) by road. Ugorye is the nearest rural locality.
