= Oktyabrskoye, Bryansk Oblast =

Oktyabrskoye Октябрьское
- Selo
- Location within Bryansk Oblast Location within Russia
- Coordinates: 53°13′N 34°12′E
- Country: Russia
- Region: Bryansk Oblast
- District: Bryansky District
- Time zone: UTC+3:00

Oktyabrskoye (Russian: Октябрьское) is a rural locality (a village) in Bryansky District, Bryansk Oblast, Russia. The population was 222 as of 2010. There are 14 streets.

== Geography ==
Oktyabrskoye is located 17 km southeast of Glinishchevo (the district's administrative centre) by road. Tiganovo is the nearest rural locality.
