= Novozheyevka =

Novozheyevka Новожеевка
- Khutor
- Location within Bryansk Oblast Location within Russia
- Coordinates: 53°29′N 33°02′E
- Country: Russia
- Region: Bryansk Oblast
- District: Kletnyansky District
- Time zone: UTC+3:00

Novozheyevka (Russian: Новожеевка) is a rural locality (a khutor) in Kletnyansky District, Bryansk Oblast, Russia. The population was 9 as of 2010. There is 1 street.

== Geography ==
Novozheyevka is located 19 km northwest of Kletnya (the district's administrative centre) by road. Staraya Marmazovka is the nearest rural locality.
