= Mirny, Kletnyansky District, Bryansk Oblast =

Mirny Мирный
- Settlement
- Location within Bryansk Oblast Location within Russia
- Coordinates: 53°22′N 32°59′E
- Country: Russia
- Region: Bryansk Oblast
- District: Kletnyansky District
- Time zone: UTC+3:00

Mirny (Russian: Мирный) is a rural locality (a settlement) in Kletnyansky District, Bryansk Oblast, Russia. The population was 701 as of 2010. There are 10 streets.

== Geography ==
Mirny is located 18 km west of Kletnya (the district's administrative centre) by road. Kharitonovka is the nearest rural locality.
