= Bolshaya Dubrava =

Bolshaya Dubrava Большая Дубрава
- Settlement
- Location within Bryansk Oblast Location within Russia
- Coordinates: 53°17′N 34°07′E
- Country: Russia
- Region: Bryansk Oblast
- District: Bryansky District
- Time zone: UTC+3:00

Bolshaya Dubrava (Russian: Большая Дубрава) is a rural locality (a settlement) in Bryansky District, Bryansk Oblast, Russia. The population was 27 as of 2013. There is 1 street.

== Geography ==
Bolshaya Dubrava is located 4 km southeast of Glinishchevo (the district's administrative centre) by road. Staroselye is the nearest rural locality.
