= Paltso =

Paltso Пальцо
- Settlement
- Location within Bryansk Oblast Location within Russia
- Coordinates: 53°17′N 34°55′E
- Country: Russia
- Region: Bryansk Oblast
- District: Bryansky District
- Time zone: UTC+3:00

Paltso (Russian: Пальцо) is a rural locality (a settlement) in Bryansky District, Bryansk Oblast, Russia. The population was 880 as of 2018. There are 21 streets.

== Geography ==
Paltso is located 90 km east of Glinishchevo (the district's administrative centre) by road. Khotomirichi is the nearest rural locality.
