= Lutna =

Lutna Лутна
- Selo
- Location within Bryansk Oblast Location within Russia
- Coordinates: 53°26′N 33°05′E
- Country: Russia
- Region: Bryansk Oblast
- District: Kletnyansky District
- Time zone: UTC+3:00

Lutna (Russian: Лутна) is a rural locality (a selo) and the administrative center of Lutenskoye Rural Settlement, Kletnyansky District, Bryansk Oblast, Russia. The population was 679 as of 2010. There are 9 streets.

== Geography ==
Lutna is located 11 km northwest of Kletnya (the district's administrative centre) by road. Osinovka is the nearest rural locality.
