= Michurino =

Michurino Мичурино
- Village
- Location within Bryansk Oblast Location within Russia
- Coordinates: 53°28′N 33°21′E
- Country: Russia
- Region: Bryansk Oblast
- District: Kletnyansky District
- Time zone: UTC+3:00

Michurino (Russian: Мичурино) is a rural locality (a village) in Kletnyansky District, Bryansk Oblast, Russia. The population was 47 as of 2010. There is 1 street.

== Geography ==
Michurino is located 16 km northeast of Kletnya (the district's administrative centre) by road. Sinitskoye is the nearest rural locality.
