= Kabalichi =

Kabalichi Кабаличи
- Selo
- Location within Bryansk Oblast Location within Russia
- Coordinates: 53°19′N 34°04′E
- Country: Russia
- Region: Bryansk Oblast
- District: Bryansky District
- Time zone: UTC+3:00

Kabalichi (Russian: Кабаличи) is a rural locality (a selo) in Bryansky District, Bryansk Oblast, Russia. The population was 626 as of 2013. There are 8 streets.

== Geography ==
Kabalichi is located 3 km north of Glinishchevo (the district's administrative centre) by road. Glinishchevo is the nearest rural locality.
