= Sadovy, Navlinsky District, Bryansk Oblast =

Sadovy Садовый
- Settlement
- Location within Bryansk Oblast Location within Russia
- Coordinates: 52°54′N 34°28′E
- Country: Russia
- Region: Bryansk Oblast
- District: Navlinsky District
- Time zone: UTC+3:00

Sadovy (Russian: Садовый) is a rural locality (a settlement) in Navlinsky District, Bryansk Oblast, Russia. The population was 97 as of 2010. There is 1 street.

== Geography ==
Sadovy is located 16 km north of Navlya (the district's administrative centre) by road. Klyukovniki is the nearest rural locality.
