= Byakovo =

Byakovo Бяково
- Selo
- Location within Bryansk Oblast Location within Russia
- Coordinates: 52°52′N 34°33′E
- Country: Russia
- Region: Bryansk Oblast
- District: Navlinsky District
- Time zone: UTC+3:00

Byakovo (Russian: Бяково) is a rural locality (a selo) and the administrative center of Byakovskoye Rural Settlement, Navlinsky District, Bryansk Oblast, Russia. The population was 576 as of 2010. There are 4 streets. Byakovo is located 8 km northeast of Navlya (the district's administrative centre) by road. Muravyevka is the nearest rural locality.
