= Sosnovskoye, Bryansk Oblast =

Sosnovskoye Сосновское
- Village
- Location within Bryansk Oblast Location within Russia
- Coordinates: 52°46′N 34°12′E
- Country: Russia
- Region: Bryansk Oblast
- District: Navlinsky District
- Time zone: UTC+3:00

Sosnovskoye (Russian: Сосновское) is a rural locality (a village) in Navlinsky District, Bryansk Oblast, Russia. The population was 40 as of 2010. There is 1 street.

== Geography ==
Sosnovskoye is located 22 km southwest of Navlya (the district's administrative centre) by road. Saltanovka is the nearest rural locality.
