= Privolye =

Privolye Приволье
- Village
- Location within Bryansk Oblast Location within Russia
- Coordinates: 52°59′N 34°27′E
- Country: Russia
- Region: Bryansk Oblast
- District: Navlinsky District
- Time zone: UTC+3:00

Privolye (Russian: Приволье) is a rural locality (a village) in Navlinsky District, Bryansk Oblast, Russia. The population was 368 as of 2010. There are 3 streets.

== Geography ==
Privolye is located 24 km north of Navlya (the district's administrative centre) by road. Chichkovo is the nearest rural locality.
