= Gorki, Komarichsky District, Bryansk Oblast =

Gorki Горки
- Village
- Location within Bryansk Oblast Location within Russia
- Coordinates: 52°26′N 34°32′E
- Country: Russia
- Region: Bryansk Oblast
- District: Komarichsky District
- Time zone: UTC+3:00

Gorki (Russian: Горки) is a rural locality (a village) in Komarichsky District, Bryansk Oblast, Russia. The population was 6 as of 2010. There is 1 street.

== Geography ==
Gorki is located 31 km west of Komarichi (the district's administrative centre) by road. Bobrik is the nearest rural locality.
