= Tuboltsy =

Tuboltsy Тубольцы
- Selo
- Location within Bryansk Oblast Location within Russia
- Coordinates: 52°52′N 33°15′E
- Country: Russia
- Region: Bryansk Oblast
- District: Pochepsky District
- Time zone: UTC+3:00

Tuboltsy (Russian: Тубольцы) is a rural locality (a selo) in Pochepsky District, Bryansk Oblast, Russia. In the 19th century the village was part of Staroselskaya volost, Mglinsky Uyezd, Chernigov Governorate. The population was 95 as of 2013. There are 2 streets.

== Geography ==
Tuboltsy is located 21 km southwest of Pochep (the district's administrative centre) by road. Mashkovo is the nearest rural locality.
