= Baldyzh =

Baldyzh Балдыж
- Village
- Location within Bryansk Oblast Location within Russia
- Coordinates: 53°17′N 34°04′E
- Country: Russia
- Region: Bryansk Oblast
- District: Bryansky District
- Time zone: UTC+3:00

Baldyzh (Russian: Балдыж) is a rural locality (a village) in Bryansky District, Bryansk Oblast, Russia. The population was 28 as of 2013. There is 1 street.

== Geography ==
Baldyzh is located 3 km south of Glinishchevo (the district's administrative centre) by road. Glinishchevo is the nearest rural locality.
