= Khotylyovo =

Khotylyovo Хотылёво
- Selo
- Location within Bryansk Oblast Location within Russia
- Coordinates: 53°20′N 34°07′E
- Country: Russia
- Region: Bryansk Oblast
- District: Bryansky District
- Time zone: UTC+3:00

Khotylyovo (Russian: Хотылёво) is a rural locality (a selo) in Bryansky District, Bryansk Oblast, Russia. The population was 303 as of 2013. There are 12 streets.

== Geography ==
Khotylyovo is located 7 km north of Glinishchevo (the district's administrative centre) by road. Stayevo is the nearest rural locality.
