= Kurnyavtsevo =

Kurnyavtsevo Курнявцево
- Village
- Location within Bryansk Oblast Location within Russia
- Coordinates: 53°12′N 34°17′E
- Country: Russia
- Region: Bryansk Oblast
- District: Bryansky District
- Time zone: UTC+3:00

Kurnyavtsevo (Russian: Курнявцево) is a rural locality (a village) in Bryansky District, Bryansk Oblast, Russia. The population was 350 as of 2010. There are 25 streets.

== Geography ==
Kurnyavtsevo is located 24 km southeast of Glinishchevo (the district's administrative centre) by road. Antonovka and Suponevo are the nearest rural localities.
