= Radogoshch =

Radogoshch Радогощь
- Selo
- Location within Bryansk Oblast Location within Russia
- Coordinates: 52°30′N 34°49′E
- Country: Russia
- Region: Bryansk Oblast
- District: Komarichsky District
- Time zone: UTC+3:00

Radogoshch (Russian: Ра́догощь) is a rural locality (a selo) in Komarichsky District, Bryansk Oblast, Russia. The population was 438 as of 2010. There are 3 streets.

== Geography ==
Radogoshch is located 12 km north of Komarichi (the district's administrative centre) by road. Kokino is the nearest rural locality.
