= Arkino =

Arkino Аркино
- Selo
- Location within Bryansk Oblast Location within Russia
- Coordinates: 52°29′N 34°39′E
- Country: Russia
- Region: Bryansk Oblast
- District: Komarichsky District
- Time zone: UTC+3:00

Arkino (Russian: Аркино) is a rural locality (a selo) and the administrative center of Arkinskoye Rural Settlement, Komarichsky District, Bryansk Oblast, Russia. The population was 473 as of 2010. There are 6 streets.

== Geography ==
Arkino is located 13 km northwest of Komarichi (the district's administrative centre) by road. Ivanovsky is the nearest rural locality.
