= Gromyki =

Gromyki Громыки
- Settlement
- Location within Bryansk Oblast Location within Russia
- Coordinates: 52°58′N 33°28′E
- Country: Russia
- Region: Bryansk Oblast
- District: Pochepsky District
- Time zone: UTC+3:00

Gromyki (Russian: Громыки) is a rural locality (a settlement) in Pochepsky District, Bryansk Oblast, Russia. The population was 510 as of 2010. There are 8 streets.

== Geography ==
Gromyki is located 7 km north of Pochep (the district's administrative centre) by road. Pochep and Setolovo are the nearest rural localities.
