= Olkhovka, Karachevsky District, Bryansk Oblast =

Olkhovka Ольховка
- Village
- Location within Bryansk Oblast Location within Russia
- Coordinates: 53°02′N 34°44′E
- Country: Russia
- Region: Bryansk Oblast
- District: Karachevsky District
- Time zone: UTC+3:00

Olkhovka (Russian: Ольховка) is a rural locality (a village) in Karachevsky District, Bryansk Oblast, Russia. The population was 5 as of 2010. There is 1 street.

== Geography ==
Olkhovka is located 23 km southwest of Karachev (the district's administrative centre) by road. Morozovka is the nearest rural locality.
