= Semyonovka, Karachevsky District, Bryansk Oblast =

Semyonovka Семёновка
- Village
- Location within Bryansk Oblast Location within Russia
- Coordinates: 53°04′N 35°16′E
- Country: Russia
- Region: Bryansk Oblast
- District: Karachevsky District
- Time zone: UTC+3:00

Semyonovka (Russian: Семёновка) is a rural locality (a village) in Karachevsky District, Bryansk Oblast, Russia. The population was 7 as of 2010. There is 1 street.

== Geography ==
Semyonovka is located 23 km southeast of Karachev (the district's administrative centre) by road. Dunayevsky is the nearest rural locality.
