= Melensk =

Melensk Меленск
- Selo
- Location within Bryansk Oblast Location within Russia
- Coordinates: 52°37′N 32°55′E
- Country: Russia
- Region: Bryansk Oblast
- District: Starodubsky District
- Time zone: UTC+3:00

Melensk (Russian: Меленск) is a rural locality (a selo) and the administrative center of Melenskoye Rural Settlement, Starodubsky District, Bryansk Oblast, Russia. The population was 996 as of 2010. There are 7 streets.

== Geography ==
Melensk is located 15 km northeast of Starodub (the district's administrative centre) by road. Savenki is the nearest rural locality.
