= Stepok =

Stepok Степок
- Selo
- Location within Bryansk Oblast Location within Russia
- Coordinates: 52°36′N 32°52′E
- Country: Russia
- Region: Bryansk Oblast
- District: Starodubsky District
- Time zone: UTC+3:00

Stepok (Russian: Степок) is a rural locality (a selo) in Starodubsky District, Bryansk Oblast, Russia. The population was 122 as of 2010. There are 4 streets.

== Geography ==
Stepok is located 9 km east of Starodub (the district's administrative centre) by road. Desyatukha is the nearest rural locality.
