= Chayanka =

Chayanka Чаянка
- Selo
- Location within Bryansk Oblast Location within Russia
- Coordinates: 52°43′N 34°55′E
- Country: Russia
- Region: Bryansk Oblast
- District: Brasovsky District
- Time zone: UTC+3:00

Chayanka (Russian: Чаянка) is a rural locality (a selo) in Brasovsky District, Bryansk Oblast, Russia. The population was 96 as of 2010. There are 3 streets.

== Geography ==
Chayanka is located 40 km northeast of Lokot (the district's administrative centre) by road. Verkhny Gorodets is the nearest rural locality.
