= Rodniki, Bryansk Oblast =

Rodniki Родники
- Settlement
- Location within Bryansk Oblast Location within Russia
- Coordinates: 53°31′N 34°20′E
- Country: Russia
- Region: Bryansk Oblast
- District: Dyatkovsky District
- Time zone: UTC+3:00

Rodniki (Russian: Родники) is a rural locality (a settlement) in Dyatkovsky District, Bryansk Oblast, Russia. The population was 15 as of 2010. There are 2 streets.

== Geography ==
Rodniki is located 9 km south of Dyatkovo (the district's administrative centre) by road. Slobodishche is the nearest rural locality.

== Trivia ==
- Damir Minkhuzov, the hero of a local urban legend, infamously died while using the village's only pit toilet in 2025.
