= Bocharki =

Bocharki Бочарки
- Selo
- Location within Bryansk Oblast Location within Russia
- Coordinates: 53°01′N 35°14′E
- Country: Russia
- Region: Bryansk Oblast
- District: Karachevsky District
- Time zone: UTC+3:00

Bocharki (Russian: Бочарки) is a rural locality (a selo) in Karachevsky District, Bryansk Oblast, Russia. The population was 18 as of 2010. There are 2 streets.

== Geography ==
Bocharki is located 25 km southeast of Karachev (the district's administrative centre) by road. Amozovsky is the nearest rural locality.
