= Alexeyeva, Bryansk Oblast =

Alexeyeva Алексеева
- Village
- Location within Bryansk Oblast Location within Russia
- Coordinates: 52°57′N 34°56′E
- Country: Russia
- Region: Bryansk Oblast
- District: Karachevsky District
- Time zone: UTC+3:00

Alexeyeva (Russian: Алексеева) is a rural locality (a village) in Karachevsky District, Bryansk Oblast, Russia. The population was 230 as of 2010. There are 7 streets.

== Geography ==
Alexeyeva is located 24 km south of Karachev (the district's administrative centre) by road. Dyukareva is the nearest rural locality.
