= Zarechnoye, Bryansk Oblast =

Zarechnoye Заречное
- Selo
- Location within Bryansk Oblast Location within Russia
- Coordinates: 52°38′N 33°13′E
- Country: Russia
- Region: Bryansk Oblast
- District: Pogarsky District
- Time zone: UTC+3:00

Zarechnoye (Russian: Заречное) is a rural locality (a selo) in Pogarsky District, Bryansk Oblast, Russia. The population was 354 as of 2010. There are 5 streets.

== Geography ==
Zarechnoye is located 13 km north of Pogar (the district's administrative centre) by road. Krasnaya Roshcha is the nearest rural locality.
