= Shokhovka =

Shokhovka Шоховка
- Village
- Location within Bryansk Oblast Location within Russia
- Coordinates: 53°59′N 33°43′E
- Country: Russia
- Region: Bryansk Oblast
- District: Rognedinsky District
- Time zone: UTC+3:00

Shokhovka (Russian: Шоховка) is a rural locality (a village) in Rognedinsky District, Bryansk Oblast, Russia. The population was 2 as of 2013. There is 1 street.

== Geography ==
Shokhovka is located 40 km north of Rognedino (the district's administrative centre) by road. Strecheya is the nearest rural locality.
