= Sosnovka, Klintsovsky District, Bryansk Oblast =

Sosnovka Сосновка
- Selo
- Location within Bryansk Oblast Location within Russia
- Coordinates: 52°49′N 32°21′E
- Country: Russia
- Region: Bryansk Oblast
- District: Klintsovsky District
- Time zone: UTC+3:00

Sosnovka (Russian: Сосновка) is a rural locality (a selo) in Klintsovsky District, Bryansk Oblast, Russia. The population was 243 as of 2010. There are 7 streets.

== Geography ==
Sosnovka is located 16 km northeast of Klintsy (the district's administrative centre) by road. Rudnya-Terekhovka is the nearest rural locality.
