= Yelionka =

Yelionka Елионка
- Selo
- Location within Bryansk Oblast Location within Russia
- Coordinates: 52°25′N 32°36′E
- Country: Russia
- Region: Bryansk Oblast
- District: Starodubsky District
- Time zone: UTC+3:00

Yelionka (Russian: Елионка) is a rural locality (a selo) in Starodubsky District, Bryansk Oblast, Russia. The population was 532 as of 2010. There are 5 streets.

== Geography ==
Yelionka is located 22 km southwest of Starodub (the district's administrative centre) by road. Solova is the nearest rural locality.
