= Novoye, Brasovsky District, Bryansk Oblast =

Novoye Новое
- Village
- Location within Bryansk Oblast Location within Russia
- Coordinates: 52°35′N 34°51′E
- Country: Russia
- Region: Bryansk Oblast
- District: Brasovsky District
- Time zone: UTC+3:00

Novoye (Russian: Новое) is a rural locality (a village) in Brasovsky District, Bryansk Oblast, Russia. The population was 22 as of 2013. There is 1 street.
