= Berezina, Unechsky District, Bryansk Oblast =

Berezina Березина
- Village
- Location within Bryansk Oblast Location within Russia
- Coordinates: 52°47′N 32°48′E
- Country: Russia
- Region: Bryansk Oblast
- District: Unechsky District
- Time zone: UTC+3:00

Berezina (Russian: Березина) is a rural locality (a village) and the administrative center of Berezinskoye Rural Settlement, Unechsky District, Bryansk Oblast, Russia. The population was 476 as of 2010. There are 5 streets.

== Geography ==
Berezina is located 15 km southeast of Unecha (the district's administrative centre) by road. Chernyatka is the nearest rural locality.
