= Yakovleva, Bryansk Oblast =

Yakovleva Яковлева
- Village
- Location within Bryansk Oblast Location within Russia
- Coordinates: 53°06′N 35°14′E
- Country: Russia
- Region: Bryansk Oblast
- District: Karachevsky District
- Time zone: UTC+3:00

Yakovleva (Russian: Яковлева) is a rural locality (a village) in Karachevsky District, Bryansk Oblast, Russia. The population was 9 as of 2010. There is 1 street in the village.

== Geography ==
Yakovleva is located 51 km east of Karachev (the district's administrative centre) by road. Alymova is the nearest rural locality.
