= Nelzhichi =

Nelzhichi Нельжичи
- Village
- Location within Bryansk Oblast Location within Russia
- Coordinates: 52°49′N 33°11′E
- Country: Russia
- Region: Bryansk Oblast
- District: Pochepsky District
- Time zone: UTC+3:00

Nelzhichi (Russian: Нельжичи) is a rural locality (a village) in Pochepsky District, Bryansk Oblast, Russia. The population was 106 as of 2013. There are 2 streets.

== Geography ==
Nelzhichi is located 24 km southwest of Pochep (the district's administrative centre) by road. Moskovsky is the nearest rural locality.
