= Zelyonaya Roshcha =

Zelyonaya Roshcha Зелёная Роща
- Village
- Location within Bryansk Oblast Location within Russia
- Coordinates: 52°16′N 31°54′E
- Country: Russia
- Region: Bryansk Oblast
- District: Zlynkovsky District
- Time zone: UTC+3:00

Zelyonaya Roshcha (Russian: Зелёная Роща) is a rural locality (a village) in Zlynkovsky District, Bryansk Oblast, Russia. The population was 26 as of 2010. There is 1 street.

== Geography ==
Zelyonaya Roshcha is located 27 km southeast of Zlynka (the district's administrative centre) by road. Malye Shcherbinichi is the nearest rural locality.
