= Kvetun =

Kvetun Кветунь
- Village
- Location within Bryansk Oblast Location within Russia
- Coordinates: 52°32′N 33°37′E
- Country: Russia
- Region: Bryansk Oblast
- District: Trubchevsky District
- Time zone: UTC+3:00

Kvetun (Russian: Кветунь) is a rural locality (a village) in Trubchevsky District, Bryansk Oblast, Russia. The population was 469 as of 2010. There are 3 streets.

== Geography ==
Kvetun is located 11 km southwest of Trubchevsk (the district's administrative centre) by road. Makarzno is the nearest rural locality.
