= Brovnichi =

Brovnichi Бровничи
- Selo
- Location within Bryansk Oblast Location within Russia
- Coordinates: 52°13′N 32°18′E
- Country: Russia
- Region: Bryansk Oblast
- District: Klimovsky District
- Time zone: UTC+3:00

Brovnichi (Russian: Бровничи) is a rural locality (a selo) in Klimovsky District, Bryansk Oblast, Russia. The population was 66 as of 2010. There are 3 streets.

== Geography ==
Brovnichi is located 21 km southeast of Klimovo (the district's administrative centre) by road. Sushany is the nearest rural locality.
