= Zasnovye =

Zasnovye Засновье
- Selo
- Location within Bryansk Oblast Location within Russia
- Coordinates: 52°30′N 32°19′E
- Country: Russia
- Region: Bryansk Oblast
- District: Klintsovsky District
- Time zone: UTC+3:00

Zasnovye (Russian: Засновье) is a rural locality (a selo) in Klintsovsky District, Bryansk Oblast, Russia. The population was 1 as of 2013. There is 1 street.

== Geography ==
Zasnovye is located 34 km south of Klintsy (the district's administrative centre) by road. Rubezhnoye is the nearest rural locality.
