= Zhudilovo =

Zhudilovo Жудилово
- Settlement
- Location within Bryansk Oblast Location within Russia
- Coordinates: 52°52′N 33°08′E
- Country: Russia
- Region: Bryansk Oblast
- District: Unechsky District
- Time zone: UTC+3:00

Zhudilovo (Russian: Жудилово) is a rural locality (a settlement) in Unechsky District, Bryansk Oblast, Russia. The population was 218 as of 2013. There are 9 streets.

== Geography ==
Zhudilovo is located 47 km east of Unecha (the district's administrative centre) by road. Staroselye is the nearest rural locality.
