= Chistopolyansky =

Chistopolyansky Чистополянский
- Settlement
- Location within Bryansk Oblast Location within Russia
- Coordinates: 52°35′N 34°33′E
- Country: Russia
- Region: Bryansk Oblast
- District: Brasovsky District
- Time zone: UTC+3:00

Chistopolyansky (Russian: Чистополянский) is a rural locality (a settlement) in Brasovsky District, Bryansk Oblast, Russia. The population was 64 as of 2013.
