= Dneprovka, Bryansk Oblast =

Dneprovka Днепровка
- Settlement
- Location within Bryansk Oblast Location within Russia
- Coordinates: 52°38′N 32°44′E
- Country: Russia
- Region: Bryansk Oblast
- District: Starodubsky District
- Time zone: UTC+3:00

Dneprovka (Russian: Днепровка) is a rural locality (a settlement) and the administrative center of Mokhonovskoye Rural Settlement, Starodubsky District, Bryansk Oblast, Russia. The population was 18 as of 2010. There are 6 streets.

== Geography ==
Dneprovka is located 9 km north of Starodub (the district's administrative centre) by road. Pyatovsk is the nearest rural locality.
