= Chernovitsa =

Chernovitsa Черновица
- Village
- Location within Bryansk Oblast Location within Russia
- Coordinates: 53°09′N 32°49′E
- Country: Russia
- Region: Bryansk Oblast
- District: Mglinsky District
- Time zone: UTC+3:00

Chernovitsa (Russian: Черновица) is a rural locality (a village) in Mglinsky District, Bryansk Oblast, Russia. The population was 60 as of 2010. There is 1 street.

== Geography ==
Chernovitsa is located 13 km north of Mglin (the district's administrative centre) by road. Kiselevka and Chernoruchye are the nearest rural localities.
