= Kurkovichi =

Kurkovichi Курковичи
- Selo
- Location within Bryansk Oblast Location within Russia
- Coordinates: 52°17′N 32°48′E
- Country: Russia
- Region: Bryansk Oblast
- District: Starodubsky District
- Time zone: UTC+3:00

Kurkovichi (Russian: Курковичи) is a rural locality (a selo) in Starodubsky District, Bryansk Oblast, Russia. The population was 455 as of 2010. There are 10 streets.

== Geography ==
Kurkovichi is located 36 km south of Starodub (the district's administrative centre) by road. Azarovka is the nearest rural locality.
