= Starye Bobovichi =

Rural locality in Novozybkovsky District, Bryansk Oblast, Russia

Coordinates: 52.588°N 31.741°E

Starye Bobovichi is a village in the Novozybkovsky District, Bryansk Oblast of Russia.

The AFP reported in 2016 that it still has high radioactivity (30 times the recommended level) due to the Chernobyl disaster, 180 kilometres (110 miles) southeast.
