= Never, Bryansk Oblast =

Never Неверь
- Village
- Location within Bryansk Oblast Location within Russia
- Coordinates: 53°31′N 34°23′E
- Country: Russia
- Region: Bryansk Oblast
- District: Dyatkovsky District
- Time zone: UTC+3:00

Never (Russian: Неверь) is a rural locality (a village) in Dyatkovsky District, Bryansk Oblast, Russia. The population was 326 as of 2010. There are 3 streets.

== Geography ==
Never is located 10 km southeast of Dyatkovo (the district's administrative centre) by road. Lyubokhna is the nearest rural locality.
