= Lobki =

Lobki Лобки
- Selo
- Location within Bryansk Oblast Location within Russia
- Coordinates: 52°29′N 33°09′E
- Country: Russia
- Region: Bryansk Oblast
- District: Pogarsky District
- Time zone: UTC+3:00

Lobki (Russian: Лобки) is a rural locality (a selo) in Pogarsky District, Bryansk Oblast, Russia. The population was 229 as of 2013. There are 5 streets.

== Geography ==
Lobki is located 11 km southwest of Pogar (the district's administrative centre) by road. Borshchovo is the nearest rural locality.
