= Pervomayskoye, Sevsky District, Bryansk Oblast =

Pervomayskoye Первомайское
- Selo
- Location within Bryansk Oblast Location within Russia
- Coordinates: 52°05′N 34°20′E
- Country: Russia
- Region: Bryansk Oblast
- District: Sevsky District
- Time zone: UTC+3:00

Pervomayskoye (Russian: Первомайское) is a rural locality (a selo) in Sevsky District, Bryansk Oblast, Russia. The population was 325 as of 2010. There are 5 streets.

== Geography ==
Pervomayskoye is located 15 km southwest of Sevsk (the district's administrative centre) by road. Polyana is the nearest rural locality.
