= Pushkino, Sevsky District, Bryansk Oblast =

Pushkino Пушкино
- Selo
- Location within Bryansk Oblast Location within Russia
- Coordinates: 52°09′N 34°20′E
- Country: Russia
- Region: Bryansk Oblast
- District: Sevsky District
- Time zone: UTC+3:00

Pushkino (Russian: Пушкино) is a rural locality (a settlement) and the administrative center of Pushkinskoye Rural Settlement, Sevsky District, Bryansk Oblast, Russia. The population was 275 as of 2010. There are 5 streets.

== Geography ==
Pushkino is located 14 km west of Sevsk (the district's administrative centre) by road. Trudovik is the nearest rural locality.
