= Dmitrovo =

Dmitrovo Дмитрово
- Selo
- Location within Bryansk Oblast Location within Russia
- Coordinates: 53°03′N 33°34′E
- Country: Russia
- Region: Bryansk Oblast
- District: Pochepsky District
- Time zone: UTC+3:00

Dmitrovo (Russian: Дмитрово) is a rural locality (a selo) and the administrative center of Dmitrovskoye Rural Settlement, Pochepsky District, Bryansk Oblast, Russia. The population was 375 as of 2010. There are 3 streets.

== Geography ==
Dmitrovo is located 20 km northeast of Pochep (the district's administrative centre) by road. Papsuyevka is the nearest rural locality.
