= Ozyorny, Bryansk Oblast =

Ozyorny Дубровка
- Settlement
- Location within Bryansk Oblast Location within Russia
- Coordinates: 52°51′N 32°57′E
- Country: Russia
- Region: Bryansk Oblast
- District: Unechsky District
- Time zone: UTC+3:00

Ozyorny (Russian: Озёрный) is a rural locality (a settlement) in Unechsky District, Bryansk Oblast, Russia. The population was 4 as of 2010. There is 1 street.

== Geography ==
Ozyorny is located 33 km east of Unecha (the district's administrative centre) by road. Rassukha is the nearest rural locality.
