= Chemerna =

Chemerna Чемерна
- Settlement
- Location within Bryansk Oblast Location within Russia
- Coordinates: 52°47′N 32°12′E
- Country: Russia
- Region: Bryansk Oblast
- District: Klintsovsky District
- Time zone: UTC+3:00

Chemerna (Russian: Чемерна) is a rural locality (a settlement) in Klintsovsky District, Bryansk Oblast, Russia. The population was 1,269 as of 2010. There are 18 streets.

== Geography ==
Chemerna is located 6 km north of Klintsy (the district's administrative centre) by road. Melyakovka and Klintsy are the nearest rural localities.
