= Novomlynka =

Novomlynka Новомлынка
- Selo
- Location within Bryansk Oblast Location within Russia
- Coordinates: 52°26′N 32°45′E
- Country: Russia
- Region: Bryansk Oblast
- District: Starodubsky District
- Time zone: UTC+3:00

Novomlynka (Russian: Новомлынка) is a rural locality (a selo) in Starodubsky District, Bryansk Oblast, Russia. The population was 268 as of 2010. There are 3 streets.

== Geography ==
Novomlynka is located 23 km south of Starodub (the district's administrative centre) by road. Privalovka is the nearest rural locality.
