= Pechki, Karachevsky District, Bryansk Oblast =

Pechki Печки
- Village
- Location within Bryansk Oblast Location within Russia
- Coordinates: 53°01′N 35°16′E
- Country: Russia
- Region: Bryansk Oblast
- District: Karachevsky District
- Time zone: UTC+3:00

Pechki (Russian: Печки) is a rural locality (a village) in Karachevsky District, Bryansk Oblast, Russia. The population was 7 as of 2010. There is 1 street.

== Geography ==
Pechki is located 28 km southeast of Karachev (the district's administrative centre) by road. Verbnik is the nearest rural locality.
