= Perelazy =

Perelazy Перелазы
- Selo
- Location within Bryansk Oblast Location within Russia
- Coordinates: 53°02′N 31°28′E
- Country: Russia
- Region: Bryansk Oblast
- District: Krasnogorsky District
- Time zone: UTC+3:00

Perelazy (Russian: Перелазы) is a rural locality (a selo) in Krasnogorsky District, Bryansk Oblast, Russia. The population was 878 as of 2010. There are 26 streets.

== Geography ==
Perelazy is located 11 km northwest of Krasnaya_Gora (the district's administrative centre) by road. Seyatel is the nearest rural locality.
