= Gulyovka =

Gulyovka Гулёвка
- Selo
- Location within Bryansk Oblast Location within Russia
- Coordinates: 52°36′N 32°13′E
- Country: Russia
- Region: Bryansk Oblast
- District: Klintsovsky District
- Time zone: UTC+3:00

Gulyovka (Russian: Гулёвка) is a rural locality (a selo) in Klintsovsky District, Bryansk Oblast, Russia. The population was 661 as of 2017. There are 13 streets.

== Geography ==
Gulyovka is located 20 km south of Klintsy (the district's administrative centre) by road. Kurganye is the nearest rural locality.
