= Moiseyeva Gora =

Moiseyeva Gora Моисеева Гора
- Settlement
- Location within Bryansk Oblast Location within Russia
- Coordinates: 53°00′N 35°14′E
- Country: Russia
- Region: Bryansk Oblast
- District: Karachevsky District
- Time zone: UTC+3:00

Moiseyeva Gora (Russian: Моисеева Гора) is a rural locality (a settlement) in Karachevsky District, Bryansk Oblast, Russia. The population was one as of 2010. There is one street.

== Geography ==
Moiseyeva Gora is located 25 km southeast of Karachev (the district's administrative centre) by road. Bavykina is the nearest rural locality.
