= Chausy, Bryansk Oblast =

Chausy Чаусы
- Selo
- Location within Bryansk Oblast Location within Russia
- Coordinates: 52°24′N 33°17′E
- Country: Russia
- Region: Bryansk Oblast
- District: Pogarsky District
- Time zone: UTC+3:00

Chausy (Russian: Чаусы) is a rural locality (a selo) in Pogarsky District, Bryansk Oblast, Russia. The population was 279 as of 2013. There are 8 streets.

== Geography ==
Chausy is located 24 km south of Pogar (the district's administrative centre) by road. Goritsy is the nearest rural locality.
