= Levenka =

Levenka Левенка
- Selo
- Location within Bryansk Oblast Location within Russia
- Coordinates: 52°35′N 32°52′E
- Country: Russia
- Region: Bryansk Oblast
- District: Starodubsky District
- Time zone: UTC+3:00

Levenka (Russian: Левенка) is a rural locality (a selo) in Starodubsky District, Bryansk Oblast, Russia. The population was 605 as of 2010. There are 6 streets.

== Geography ==
Levenka is located 9 km east of Starodub (the district's administrative centre) by road. Gudkovsky is the nearest rural locality.
