= Bavykina =

Bavykina Бавыкина
- Village
- Location within Bryansk Oblast Location within Russia
- Coordinates: 53°00′N 35°14′E
- Country: Russia
- Region: Bryansk Oblast
- District: Karachevsky District
- Time zone: UTC+3:00

Bavykina (Russian: Бавыкина) is a rural locality (a village) in Karachevsky District, Bryansk Oblast, Russia. The population was 2 as of 2010. There is 1 street.

== Geography ==
Bavykina is located 25 km southeast of Karachev (the district's administrative centre) by road. Moiseyeva Gora is the nearest rural locality.
