= Progress, Pochepsky District, Bryansk Oblast =

Progress Прогресс
- Settlement
- Location within Bryansk Oblast Location within Russia
- Coordinates: 52°42′N 33°24′E
- Country: Russia
- Region: Bryansk Oblast
- District: Pochepsky District
- Time zone: UTC+3:00

Progress (Russian: Прогресс) is a rural locality (a settlement) in Pochepsky District, Bryansk Oblast, Russia. The population was 12 as of 2010. There is 1 street.

== Geography ==
Progress is located 31 km south of Pochep (the district's administrative centre) by road. Gamaleyevka is the nearest rural locality.
