= Dubrava, Pochepsky District, Bryansk Oblast =

Dubrava Дубрава
- Village
- Location within Bryansk Oblast Location within Russia
- Coordinates: 53°05′N 33°17′E
- Country: Russia
- Region: Bryansk Oblast
- District: Pochepsky District
- Time zone: UTC+3:00

Dubrava (Russian: Дубрава) is a rural locality (a village) in Pochepsky District, Bryansk Oblast, Russia. The population was 4 as of 2010. There is 1 street.

== Geography ==
Dubrava is located 30 km northwest of Pochep (the district's administrative centre) by road. Strelitsa is the nearest rural locality.
