= Zaytsevsky =

Zaytsevsky Зайцевский
- Settlement
- Location within Bryansk Oblast Location within Russia
- Coordinates: 52°04′N 34°40′E
- Country: Russia
- Region: Bryansk Oblast
- District: Sevsky District
- Time zone: UTC+3:00

Zaytsevsky (Russian: Зайцевский) is a rural locality (a settlement) in Sevsky District, Bryansk Oblast, Russia. The population was 9 as of 2010. There is 1 street.

== Geography ==
Zaytsevsky is located 51 km southeast of Sevsk (the district's administrative centre) by road. Dobrovodye is the nearest rural locality.
