= Pervomaysky, Pochepsky District, Bryansk Oblast =

Pervomaysky Первомайский
- Settlement
- Location within Bryansk Oblast Location within Russia
- Coordinates: 52°53′N 33°13′E
- Country: Russia
- Region: Bryansk Oblast
- District: Pochepsky District
- Time zone: UTC+3:00

Pervomaysky (Russian: Первомайский) is a rural locality (a settlement) in Pochepsky District, Bryansk Oblast, Russia. The population was 833 as of 2010. There are 8 streets.

== Geography ==
Pervomaysky is located 25 km southwest of Pochep (the district's administrative centre) by road. Vormino is the nearest rural locality.
