= Borshchovo =

Borshchovo Борщово
- Selo
- Location within Bryansk Oblast Location within Russia
- Coordinates: 52°28′N 33°08′E
- Country: Russia
- Region: Bryansk Oblast
- District: Pogarsky District
- Time zone: UTC+3:00

Borshchovo (Russian: Борщово) is a rural locality (a selo) in Pogarsky District, Bryansk Oblast, Russia. The population was 686 as of 2013. There are 08 streets.

== Geography ==
Borshchovo is located 14 km southwest of Pogar (the district's administrative centre) by the road. Lobki is the nearest rural locality.
