= Verkhneye =

Verkhneye Верхнее
- Selo
- Location within Bryansk Oblast Location within Russia
- Coordinates: 52°36′N 34°52′E
- Country: Russia
- Region: Bryansk Oblast
- District: Brasovsky District
- Time zone: UTC+3:00

Verkhneye (Russian: Верхнее) is a rural locality (a selo) in Brasovsky District, Bryansk Oblast, Russia. The population was 25 as of 2013. There is 1 street.
