= Luzhki, Unechsky District, Bryansk Oblast =

Luzhki Лужки
- Village
- Location within Bryansk Oblast Location within Russia
- Coordinates: 52°46′N 32°57′E
- Country: Russia
- Region: Bryansk Oblast
- District: Unechsky District
- Time zone: UTC+3:00

Luzhki (Russian: Лужки) is a rural locality (a village) in Unechsky District, Bryansk Oblast, Russia. The population was 49 as of 2010. There are two streets.

== Geography ==
Luzhki is located 26 km southeast of Unecha (the district's administrative center) by road. Trukhanovo is the nearest rural locality.
