= Gubostovo =

Gubostovo Губостово
- Selo
- Location within Bryansk Oblast Location within Russia
- Coordinates: 52°52′N 33°13′E
- Country: Russia
- Region: Bryansk Oblast
- District: Pochepsky District
- Time zone: UTC+3:00

Gubostovo (Russian: Губостово) is a rural locality (a selo) in Pochepsky District, Bryansk Oblast, Russia. The population was 33 as of 2013. There is 1 street.

== Geography ==
Gubostovo is located 25 km southwest of Pochep (the district's administrative centre) by road. Pervomaysky is the nearest rural locality.
