= Gartsevo =

Gartsevo Гарцево
- Selo
- Location within Bryansk Oblast Location within Russia
- Coordinates: 52°44′N 32°59′E
- Country: Russia
- Region: Bryansk Oblast
- District: Starodubsky District
- Time zone: UTC+3:00

Gartsevo (Russian: Гарцево) is a rural locality (a selo) and the administrative center of Gartsevskoye Rural Settlement, Starodubsky District, Bryansk Oblast, Russia. The population was 214 as of 2010. There are 6 streets.

== Geography ==
Gartsevo is located 27 km northeast of Starodub (the district's administrative centre) by road. Kolodezki is the nearest rural locality.
