= Subbotovo =

Subbotovo Субботово
- Village
- Location within Bryansk Oblast Location within Russia
- Coordinates: 52°38′N 33°54′E
- Country: Russia
- Region: Bryansk Oblast
- District: Trubchevsky District
- Time zone: UTC+3:00

Subbotovo (Russian: Субботово) is a rural locality (a village) in Trubchevsky District, Bryansk Oblast, Russia. The population was 21 as of 2010. There is 1 street.

== Geography ==
Subbotovo is located 17 km northeast of Trubchevsk (the district's administrative centre) by road. Radutino is the nearest rural locality.
