= Muravinka =

Muravinka Муравинка
- Village
- Location within Bryansk Oblast Location within Russia
- Coordinates: 52°28′N 31°47′E
- Country: Russia
- Region: Bryansk Oblast
- District: Zlynkovsky District
- Time zone: UTC+3:00

Muravinka (Russian: Муравинка) is a rural locality (a village) in Zlynkovsky District, Bryansk Oblast, Russia. The population was 5 as of 2013. There are 3 streets.

== Geography ==
Muravinka is located 9 km northeast of Zlynka (the district's administrative centre) by road. Guta is the nearest rural locality.
