= Priyutovo, Karachevsky District, Bryansk Oblast =

Priyutovo Приютово
- Village
- Location within Bryansk Oblast Location within Russia
- Coordinates: 53°05′N 34°41′E
- Country: Russia
- Region: Bryansk Oblast
- District: Karachevsky District
- Time zone: UTC+3:00

Priyutovo (Russian: Приютово) is a rural locality (a village) in Karachevsky District, Bryansk Oblast, Russia. The population was 4 as of 2010. There is 1 street.

== Geography ==
Priyutovo is located 24 km southwest of Karachev (the district's administrative centre) by road. Tsaryovo Zaymishche is the nearest rural locality.
