= Klyonovsky =

Klyonovsky Клёновский
- Settlement
- Location within Bryansk Oblast Location within Russia
- Coordinates: 53°33′N 34°05′E
- Country: Russia
- Region: Bryansk Oblast
- District: Dyatkovsky District
- Time zone: UTC+3:00

Klyonovsky (Russian: Клёновский) is a rural locality (a settlement) in Dyatkovsky District, Bryansk Oblast, Russia. The population was 25 as of 2010.

== Geography ==
Klyonovsky is located 31 km southwest of Dyatkovo (the district's administrative centre) by road. Starye Umyslichi is the nearest rural locality.
