= Lapino, Bryansk Oblast =

Selo in Russia

Lapino Лапино
- Selo
- Location within Bryansk Oblast Location within Russia
- Coordinates: 52°45′N 33°12′E
- Country: Russia
- Region: Bryansk Oblast
- District: Pochepsky District
- Time zone: UTC+3:00

Lapino (Russian: Лапино) is a rural locality (a selo) in Pochepsky District, Bryansk Oblast, Russia. The population was 158 as of 2010. There are 7 streets.

== Geography ==
Lapino is located 33 km southwest of Pochep (the district's administrative centre) by road. Pukosino and Krasnoznamensky are the nearest rural localities.
