= Rechitsa, Pochepsky District, Bryansk Oblast =

Rechitsa Речица
- Settlement
- Location within Bryansk Oblast Location within Russia
- Coordinates: 52°53′N 33°27′E
- Country: Russia
- Region: Bryansk Oblast
- District: Pochepsky District
- Time zone: UTC+3:00

Rechitsa (Russian: Речица) is a rural locality (a settlement) and the administrative center of Rechitskoye Rural Settlement, Pochepsky District, Bryansk Oblast, Russia. The population was 2,227 as of 2010. There are 22 streets.

== Geography ==
Rechitsa is located 6 km south of Pochep (the district's administrative centre) by road. Pochep is the nearest rural locality.
