= Oktyabrsky, Pochepsky District, Bryansk Oblast =

Oktyabrsky Октябрьский
- Settlement
- Location within Bryansk Oblast Location within Russia
- Coordinates: 52°44′N 33°17′E
- Country: Russia
- Region: Bryansk Oblast
- District: Pochepsky District
- Time zone: UTC+3:00

Oktyabrsky (Russian: Октябрьский) is a rural locality (a settlement) in Pochepsky District, Bryansk Oblast, Russia. The population was 240 as of 2010. There are 5 streets.

== Geography ==
Oktyabrsky is located 32 km southwest of Pochep (the district's administrative centre) by road. Mostishche is the nearest rural locality.
