= Malygin, Bryansk Oblast =

Malygin Малыгин
- Passing loop
- Location within Bryansk Oblast Location within Russia
- Coordinates: 53°34′N 34°22′E
- Country: Russia
- Region: Bryansk Oblast
- District: Dyatkovsky District
- Time zone: UTC+3:00

Malygin (Russian: Малыгин) is a rural locality (a passing loop) in Dyatkovsky District, Bryansk Oblast, Russia. The population was 1 as of 2010. There is 1 street (Vokzalnaya, Russian: Вокзальная).

== Geography ==
Malygin is located 8 km south of Dyatkovo (the district's administrative centre) by road. Latyshovka is the nearest rural locality.
