= Pochinok, Bryansk Oblast =

Pochinok Починок
- Village
- Location within Bryansk Oblast Location within Russia
- Coordinates: 52°50′N 33°18′E
- Country: Russia
- Region: Bryansk Oblast
- District: Pochepsky District
- Time zone: UTC+3:00

Pochinok (Russian: Починок) is a rural locality (a village) in Pochepsky District, Bryansk Oblast, Russia. The population was 35 as of 2010. There are 2 streets.

== Geography ==
Pochinok is located 15 km southwest of Pochep (the district's administrative centre) by road. Titovka and Polyana are the nearest rural localities.
