= Mylinka =

Mylinka Мылинка
- Village
- Location within Bryansk Oblast Location within Russia
- Coordinates: 53°10′N 34°50′E
- Country: Russia
- Region: Bryansk Oblast
- District: Karachevsky District
- Time zone: UTC+3:00

Mylinka (Russian: Мылинка) is a rural locality (a village) in Karachevsky District, Bryansk Oblast, Russia. The population was 293 as of 2010. There are 18 streets.

== Geography ==
Mylinka is located 13 km northwest of Karachev (the district's administrative centre) by road. Voskresensky is the nearest rural locality.
