= Merenovka =

Merenovka Мереновка
- Selo
- Location within Bryansk Oblast Location within Russia
- Coordinates: 52°34′N 32°50′E
- Country: Russia
- Region: Bryansk Oblast
- District: Starodubsky District
- Time zone: UTC+3:00

Merenovka (Russian: Мереновка) is a rural locality (a selo) in Starodubsky District, Bryansk Oblast, Russia. The population was 201 as of 2010. There are 2 streets.

== Geography ==
Merenovka is located 6 km southeast of Starodub (the district's administrative centre) by road. Desyatukha is the nearest rural locality.
