= Pavlovichi =

Pavlovichi Павловичи
- Selo
- Location within Bryansk Oblast Location within Russia
- Coordinates: 52°12′N 34°12′E
- Country: Russia
- Region: Bryansk Oblast
- District: Suzemsky District
- Time zone: UTC+3:00

Pavlovichi (Russian: Павловичи) is a rural locality (a selo) in Suzemsky District, Bryansk Oblast, Russia. The population was 199 as of 2010. There are 4 streets.

== Geography ==
Pavlovichi is located 17 km southeast of Suzemka (the district's administrative centre) by road. Polevye Novosyolki is the nearest rural locality.
