= Morozovka, Krasnogorsky District, Bryansk Oblast =

Morozovka Морозовка
- Village
- Location within Bryansk Oblast Location within Russia
- Coordinates: 53°09′N 31°31′E
- Country: Russia
- Region: Bryansk Oblast
- District: Krasnogorsky District
- Time zone: UTC+3:00

Morozovka (Russian: Морозовка) is a rural locality (a village) in Krasnogorsky District, Bryansk Oblast, Russia. The population was 83 as of 2013. There is 1 street.
