= Novy Ropsk =

Novy Ropsk Новый Ропск
- Selo
- Location within Bryansk Oblast Location within Russia
- Coordinates: 52°17′N 32°18′E
- Country: Russia
- Region: Bryansk Oblast
- District: Klimovsky District
- Time zone: UTC+3:00

Novy Ropsk (Russian: Новый Ропск) is a rural locality (a selo) and the administrative center of Novoropskoye Rural Settlement, Klimovsky District, Bryansk Oblast, Russia. The population was 1,293 as of 2010. There are 27 streets.

== Geography ==
Novy Ropsk is located 14 km southeast of Klimovo (the district's administrative centre) by road. Stary Ropsk is the nearest rural locality.
