= Malinovka, Starodubsky District, Bryansk Oblast =

Malinovka Малиновка
- Settlement
- Location within Bryansk Oblast Location within Russia
- Coordinates: 52°17′N 32°56′E
- Country: Russia
- Region: Bryansk Oblast
- District: Starodubsky District
- Time zone: UTC+3:00

Malinovka (Russian: Малиновка) is a rural locality (a settlement) and the administrative center of Desyatukhovsky Rural Settlement, Starodubsky District, Bryansk Oblast, Russia. The population was 5 as of 2010. There is 1 street.

== Geography ==
Malinovka is located 46 km south of Starodub (the district's administrative centre) by road. Azarovka is the nearest rural locality.
