= Kocherzhinka =

Kocherzhinka Кочержинка
- Village
- Location within Bryansk Oblast Location within Russia
- Coordinates: 53°04′N 35°11′E
- Country: Russia
- Region: Bryansk Oblast
- District: Karachevsky District
- Time zone: UTC+3:00

Kocherzhinka (Russian: Кочержинка) is a rural locality (a village) in Karachevsky District, Bryansk Oblast, Russia. The population was 27 as of 2010. There is 1 street.

== Geography ==
Kocherzhinka is located 22 km southeast of Karachev (the district's administrative centre) by road. Karpovka is the nearest rural locality.
