= Chubkovichi =

Chubkovichi Чубковичи
- Selo
- Location within Bryansk Oblast Location within Russia
- Coordinates: 52°31′N 32°36′E
- Country: Russia
- Region: Bryansk Oblast
- District: Starodubsky District
- Time zone: UTC+3:00

Chubkovichi (Russian: Чубковичи) is a rural locality (a selo) in Starodubsky District, Bryansk Oblast, Russia. The population was 374 as of 2010. There are 6 streets.

== Geography ==
Chubkovichi is located 16 km southwest of Starodub (the district's administrative centre) by road. Kamen is the nearest rural locality.
