= Ozyornoye, Bryansk Oblast =

Ozyornoye Озёрное
- Selo
- Location within Bryansk Oblast Location within Russia
- Coordinates: 52°27′N 32°42′E
- Country: Russia
- Region: Bryansk Oblast
- District: Starodubsky District
- Time zone: UTC+3:00

Ozyornoye (Russian: Озёрное) is a rural locality (a selo) in Starodubsky District, Bryansk Oblast, Russia. The population was 19 as of 2010. There are 4 streets.

== Geography ==
Ozyornoye is located 19 km south of Starodub (the district's administrative centre) by road. Privalovka and Novomlynka are the nearest rural localities.
