= Osinovye Dvoriki =

Osinovye Dvoriki Осиновые Дворики
- Village
- Location within Bryansk Oblast Location within Russia
- Coordinates: 53°07′N 34°37′E
- Country: Russia
- Region: Bryansk Oblast
- District: Karachevsky District
- Time zone: UTC+3:00

Osinovye Dvoriki (Russian: Осиновые Дворики) is a rural locality (a village) in Karachevsky District, Bryansk Oblast, Russia. The population was 4 as of 2010. There is 1 street.

== Geography ==
Osinovye Dvoriki is located 35 km west of Karachev (the district's administrative centre) by road. Khatsun is the nearest rural locality.
