= Karpovka, Karachevsky District, Bryansk Oblast =

Karpovka Карповка
- Village
- Location within Bryansk Oblast Location within Russia
- Coordinates: 53°04′N 35°10′E
- Country: Russia
- Region: Bryansk Oblast
- District: Karachevsky District
- Time zone: UTC+3:00

Karpovka (Russian: Карповка) is a rural locality (a village) in Karachevsky District, Bryansk Oblast, Russia. The population was 2 as of 2010. There is 1 street.

== Geography ==
Karpovka is located 22 km southeast of Karachev (the district's administrative centre) by road. Kocherzhinka is the nearest rural locality.
