= Zhitnya (settlement) =

Zhitnya Житня
- Settlement
- Location within Bryansk Oblast Location within Russia
- Coordinates: 53°05′N 33°17′E
- Country: Russia
- Region: Bryansk Oblast
- District: Pochepsky District
- Time zone: UTC+3:00

Zhitnya (Russian: Житня) is a rural locality (a settlement) in Pochepsky District, Bryansk Oblast, Russia. The population was 428 as of 2010. There is 1 street.

== Geography ==
Zhitnya is located 10 km northwest of Pochep (the district's administrative centre) by road. Zhitnya (village) is the nearest rural locality.
