= Tsvetniki =

Tsvetniki Цветники
- Settlement
- Location within Bryansk Oblast Location within Russia
- Coordinates: 53°23′N 33°43′E
- Country: Russia
- Region: Bryansk Oblast
- District: Zhukovsky District
- Time zone: UTC+3:00

Tsvetniki (Russian: Цветники) is a rural locality (a settlement) in Zhukovsky District, Bryansk Oblast, Russia. The population was 96 as of 2010. There are 4 streets.

== Geography ==
Tsvetniki is located 22 km south of Zhukovka (the district's administrative centre) by road. Pesochnya is the nearest rural locality.
