= Yasnoye Solntse =

Yasnoye Solntse Ясное Солнце
- Settlement
- Location within Bryansk Oblast Location within Russia
- Coordinates: 51°55′N 34°18′E
- Country: Russia
- Region: Bryansk Oblast
- District: Sevsky District
- Time zone: UTC+3:00

Yasnoye Solntse (Russian: Ясное Солнце) is a rural locality (a settlement) in Sevsky District, Bryansk Oblast, Russia. The population was 8 as of 2010.

== Geography ==
Yasnoye Solntse is located 37 km southwest of Sevsk (the district's administrative centre) by road. Kruglaya Polyana is the nearest rural locality.
