= Novy Varin =

Novy Varin Новый Варин
- Settlement
- Location within Bryansk Oblast Location within Russia
- Coordinates: 52°11′N 32°02′E
- Country: Russia
- Region: Bryansk Oblast
- District: Klimovsky District
- Time zone: UTC+3:00

Novy Varin (Russian: Новый Варин) is a rural locality (a settlement) in Klimovsky District, Bryansk Oblast, Russia. The population was 24 as of 2010. There is 1 street.

== Geography ==
Novy Varin is located 24 km southwest of Klimovo (the district's administrative centre) by road. Voznesensk is the nearest rural locality.
