= Gorislovo =

Gorislovo Горислово
- Selo
- Location within Bryansk Oblast Location within Russia
- Coordinates: 52°38′N 32°49′E
- Country: Russia
- Region: Bryansk Oblast
- District: Starodubsky District
- Time zone: UTC+3:00

Gorislovo (Russian: Горислово) is a rural locality (a selo) in Starodubsky District, Bryansk Oblast, Russia. The population was 29 as of 2010. There are 7 streets.

== Geography ==
Gorislovo is located 11 km northeast of Starodub (the district's administrative centre) by road. Nevstruyevo is the nearest rural locality.
