= Zarechny, Bryansk Oblast =

Zarechny Заречный
- Settlement
- Location within Bryansk Oblast Location within Russia
- Coordinates: 52°11′N 34°28′E
- Country: Russia
- Region: Bryansk Oblast
- District: Sevsky District
- Time zone: UTC+3:00

Zarechny (Russian: Заречный) is a rural locality (a settlement) in Sevsky District, Bryansk Oblast, Russia. The population was 440 as of 2010. There are 5 streets.

== Geography ==
Zarechny is located 5 km north of Sevsk (the district's administrative centre) by road. Penkozavod is the nearest rural locality.
