= Malaya Topal =

Malaya Topal Малая Топаль
- Selo
- Location within Bryansk Oblast Location within Russia
- Coordinates: 52°32′N 32°19′E
- Country: Russia
- Region: Bryansk Oblast
- District: Klintsovsky District
- Time zone: UTC+3:00

Malaya Topal (Russian: Малая Топаль) is a rural locality (a selo) in Klintsovsky District, Bryansk Oblast, Russia. The population was 404 as of 2013. There are 3 streets.

== Geography ==
Malaya Topal is located 31 km south of Klintsy (the district's administrative centre) by road. Drovoseki is the nearest rural locality.
