= Ostroglyadovo =

Ostroglyadovo Остроглядово
- Selo
- Location within Bryansk Oblast Location within Russia
- Coordinates: 52°36′N 32°42′E
- Country: Russia
- Region: Bryansk Oblast
- District: Starodubsky District
- Time zone: UTC+3:00

Ostroglyadovo (Russian: Остроглядово) is a rural locality (a selo) in Starodubsky District, Bryansk Oblast, Russia. The population was 522 as of 2010. There are 12 streets.

== Geography ==
Ostroglyadovo is located 5 km northwest of Starodub (the district's administrative centre) by road. Shkryabino and Starodub are the nearest rural localities.
