= Baklan, Bryansk Oblast =

Baklan Баклань
- Selo
- Location within Bryansk Oblast Location within Russia
- Coordinates: 52°44′N 33°15′E
- Country: Russia
- Region: Bryansk Oblast
- District: Pochepsky District
- Time zone: UTC+3:00

Baklan (Russian: Баклань) is a rural locality (a selo) in Pochepsky District, Bryansk Oblast, Russia. The population was 963 as of 2010. There are 11 streets.

== Geography ==
Baklan is located 36 km southwest of Pochep (the district's administrative centre) by road. Oktyabrsky is the nearest rural locality.
