= Uvelye =

Uvelye Увелье
- Selo
- Location within Bryansk Oblast Location within Russia
- Coordinates: 52°46′N 31°39′E
- Country: Russia
- Region: Bryansk Oblast
- District: Krasnogorsky District
- Time zone: UTC+3:00

Uvelye (Russian: Увелье) is a rural locality (a selo) in Krasnogorsky District, Bryansk Oblast, Russia. The population was 331 in 2010. There are 17 streets.
