= Olkhovy =

Rural settlement in Russia

Olkhovy Ольховый
- Settlement
- Location within Bryansk Oblast Location within Russia
- Coordinates: 52°55′N 32°33′E
- Country: Russia
- Region: Bryansk Oblast
- District: Unechsky District
- Time zone: UTC+3:00

Olkhovy (Russian: Ольховый) is a rural locality (a settlement) in Unechsky District, Bryansk Oblast, Russia. The population was 3 as of 2010. There is 1 street.

== Geography ==
Olkhovy is located 12 km northwest of Unecha (the district's administrative centre) by road. Ivanov is the nearest rural locality.
