= Dunayevsky, Bryansk Oblast =

Dunayevsky Дунаевский
- Settlement
- Location within Bryansk Oblast Location within Russia
- Coordinates: 53°02′N 35°14′E
- Country: Russia
- Region: Bryansk Oblast
- District: Karachevsky District
- Time zone: UTC+3:00

Dunayevsky (Russian: Дунаевский) is a rural locality (a settlement) and the administrative center of Dronovskoye Rural Settlement, Karachevsky District, Bryansk Oblast, Russia. The population was 494 as of 2010. There are 8 streets.

== Geography ==
Dunayevsky is located 22 km southeast of Karachev (the district's administrative centre) by road. Amozovsky is the nearest rural locality.
