= Belovodka =

Belovodka Беловодка
- Settlement
- Location within Bryansk Oblast Location within Russia
- Coordinates: 53°03′N 32°47′E
- Country: Russia
- Region: Bryansk Oblast
- District: Mglinsky District
- Time zone: UTC+3:00

Belovodka (Russian: Беловодка) is a rural locality (a settlement) and the administrative center of Belovodskoye Rural Settlement, Mglinsky District, Bryansk Oblast, Russia. The population was 498 as of 2010. There are 4 streets.

== Geography ==
Belovodka is located 4 km west of Mglin (the district's administrative centre) by road. Borhshchov is the nearest rural locality.
