= Luzhki, Starodubsky District, Bryansk Oblast =

Luzhki Лужки
- Selo
- Location within Bryansk Oblast Location within Russia
- Coordinates: 52°21′N 32°34′E
- Country: Russia
- Region: Bryansk Oblast
- District: Starodubsky District
- Time zone: UTC+3:00

Luzhki (Russian: Лужки) is a rural locality (a selo) in Starodubsky District, Bryansk Oblast, Russia. The population was 455 as of 2010. There are 7 streets.

== Geography ==
Luzhki is located 37 km southwest of Starodub (the district's administrative centre) by road. Voronok is the nearest rural locality.
