= Vereshcha =

Vereshcha Вереща
- Village
- Location within Bryansk Oblast Location within Russia
- Coordinates: 53°12′N 34°52′E
- Country: Russia
- Region: Bryansk Oblast
- District: Karachevsky District
- Time zone: UTC+3:00

Vereshcha (Russian: Вереща) is a rural locality (a village) in Karachevsky District, Bryansk Oblast, Russia. The population was 254 as of 2013. There is 1 street.

== Geography ==
Vereshcha is located 19 km northwest of Karachev (the district's administrative centre) by road. Mylinka is the nearest rural locality.
