= Opteni =

Opteni Оптени
- Village
- Location within Bryansk Oblast Location within Russia
- Coordinates: 52°20′N 32°24′E
- Country: Russia
- Region: Bryansk Oblast
- District: Klimovsky District
- Time zone: UTC+3:00

Opteni (Russian: Оптени) is a rural locality (a village) in Klimovsky District, Bryansk Oblast, Russia. The population was 15 as of 2010. There is 1 street.

== Geography ==
Opteni is located 21 km south of Klimovo (the district's administrative centre) by road.
