= Zhitnya =

Zhitnya Житня
- Village
- Location within Bryansk Oblast Location within Russia
- Coordinates: 52°57′N 33°21′E
- Country: Russia
- Region: Bryansk Oblast
- District: Pochepsky District
- Time zone: UTC+3:00

Zhitnya (Russian: Житня) is a rural locality (a village) in Pochepsky District, Bryansk Oblast, Russia. The population was 212 as of 2010. There are 2 streets.

== Geography ==
Zhitnya is located 10.3 km northwest of Pochep (the district's administrative centre) by road. Zhitnya (settlement) is the closest rural locality.
