= Dobrodeyevka =

Dobrodeyevka Добродеевка
- Selo
- Location within Bryansk Oblast Location within Russia
- Coordinates: 52°29′N 31°38′E
- Country: Russia
- Region: Bryansk Oblast
- District: Zlynkovsky District
- Time zone: UTC+3:00

Dobrodeyevka (Russian: Добродеевка) is a rural locality (a selo) in Zlynkovsky District, Bryansk Oblast, Russia. The population was 451 as of 2010. There are 7 streets.

== Geography ==
Dobrodeyevka is located 11 km (6.8 mi) northwest of Zlynka (the district's administrative centre) by road. Vyshkov is the nearest rural locality.
