= Podlesny, Bryansk Oblast =

Podlesny Подлесный
- Settlement
- Location within Bryansk Oblast Location within Russia
- Coordinates: 52°00′N 34°20′E
- Country: Russia
- Region: Bryansk Oblast
- District: Sevsky District
- Time zone: UTC+3:00

Podlesny (Russian: Подлесный) is a rural locality (a settlement) in Sevsky District, Bryansk Oblast, Russia. The population was 6 as of 2010.

== Geography ==
Podlesny is located 25 km southwest of Sevsk (the district's administrative centre) by road. Voskresenovka is the nearest rural locality.
