= Zarechye, Gushchinsky Selsoviet, Pochepsky District, Bryansk Oblast =

Zarechye Заречье
- Village
- Location within Bryansk Oblast Location within Russia
- Coordinates: 52°54′N 33°10′E
- Country: Russia
- Region: Bryansk Oblast
- District: Pochepsky District
- Time zone: UTC+3:00

Zarechye (Russian: Заречье) is a rural locality (a village) in Pochepsky District, Bryansk Oblast, Russia. The population was 12 as of 2010.
