= Shamovka =

Shamovka Шамовка
- Village
- Location within Bryansk Oblast Location within Russia
- Coordinates: 52°23′N 32°28′E
- Country: Russia
- Region: Bryansk Oblast
- District: Klimovsky District
- Time zone: UTC+3:00

Shamovka (Russian: Шамовка) is a rural locality (a village) in Klimovsky District, Bryansk Oblast, Russia. The population was 100 as of 2010. There are 3 streets.

== Geography ==
Shamovka is located 25 km east of Klimovo (the district's administrative centre) by road. Chernookovo and Brakhlov are the nearest rural localities.
