= Soglasiye =

Soglasiye Согласие
- Village
- Location within Bryansk Oblast Location within Russia
- Coordinates: 53°58′N 33°34′E
- Country: Russia
- Region: Bryansk Oblast
- District: Rognedinsky District
- Time zone: UTC+3:00

Soglasiye (Russian: Согласие) is a rural locality (a village) in Rognedinsky District, Bryansk Oblast, Russia. The population was 4 as of 2013. There is 1 street.
