= Trudovik, Sevsky District, Bryansk Oblast =

Trudovik Трудовик
- Settlement
- Location within Bryansk Oblast Location within Russia
- Coordinates: 52°08′N 34°22′E
- Country: Russia
- Region: Bryansk Oblast
- District: Sevsky District
- Time zone: UTC+3:00

Trudovik (Russian: Трудовик) is a rural locality (a settlement) in Sevsky District, Bryansk Oblast, Russia. The population was 3 as of 2010. There is 1 street.

== Geography ==
Trudovik is located 15 km west of Sevsk (the district's administrative centre) by road. Pushkino is the nearest rural locality.
