= Stepnoy, Bryansk Oblast =

Stepnoy Степной
- Settlement
- Location within Bryansk Oblast Location within Russia
- Coordinates: 53°01′N 33°04′E
- Country: Russia
- Region: Bryansk Oblast
- District: Mglinsky District
- Time zone: UTC+3:00

Stepnoy (Russian: Степной) is a rural locality (a settlement) in Mglinsky District, Bryansk Oblast, Russia. The population was 6 as of 2010. There is 1 street.

== Geography ==
Stepnoy is located 18 km southeast of Mglin (the district's administrative centre) by road. Divovka is the nearest rural locality.
