= Sadovaya, Starodubsky District, Bryansk Oblast =

Sadovaya Садовая
- Village
- Location within Bryansk Oblast Location within Russia
- Coordinates: 52°42′N 33°03′E
- Country: Russia
- Region: Bryansk Oblast
- District: Starodubsky District
- Time zone: UTC+3:00

Sadovaya (Russian: Садовая) is a rural locality (a village) in Starodubsky District, Bryansk Oblast, Russia. The population was 25 as of 2010. There is 1 street.

== Geography ==
Sadovaya is located 31 km northeast of Starodub (the district's administrative centre) by road. Shershevichi is the nearest rural locality.
