= Desnyansky =

Desnyansky Деснянский
- Settlement
- Location within Bryansk Oblast Location within Russia
- Coordinates: 52°52′N 33°57′E
- Country: Russia
- Region: Bryansk Oblast
- District: Vygonichsky District
- Time zone: UTC+3:00

Desnyansky (Russian: Деснянский) is a rural locality (a settlement) and the administrative center of Utynskoye Rural Settlement, Vygonichsky District, Bryansk Oblast, Russia. The population was 474 as of 2010. There are 6 streets.

== Geography ==
Desnyansky is located 31 km south of Vygonichi (the district's administrative centre) by road. Uty is the nearest rural locality.
