= Beryozovaya Roshcha =

Beryozovaya Roshcha Берёзовая Роща
- Village
- Location within Bryansk Oblast Location within Russia
- Coordinates: 52°52′N 33°55′E
- Country: Russia
- Region: Bryansk Oblast
- District: Vygonichsky District
- Time zone: UTC+3:00

Beryozovaya Roshcha (Russian: Берёзовая Роща) is a rural locality (a village) in the Vygonichsky District, Bryansk Oblast, Russia. The population was 32 as of 2010. There is one street.

== Geography ==
Beryozovaya Roshcha is located 33 km south of Vygonichi (the district's administrative centre) by road. Desnyansky is the nearest rural locality.
