= Amozovsky =

Amozovsky Амозовский
- Settlement
- Location within Bryansk Oblast Location within Russia
- Coordinates: 53°02′N 35°13′E
- Country: Russia
- Region: Bryansk Oblast
- District: Karachevsky District
- Time zone: UTC+3:00

Amozovsky (Russian: Амозовский) is a rural locality (a settlement) in Karachevsky District, Bryansk Oblast, Russia. The population was 20 as of 2010. There is 1 street.

== Geography ==
Amozovsky is located 23 km southeast of Karachev (the district's administrative centre) by road. Dunayevsky is the nearest rural locality.
