= Khokhlovka, Karachevsky District, Bryansk Oblast =

Khokhlovka Хохловка
- Village
- Location within Bryansk Oblast Location within Russia
- Coordinates: 53°08′N 34°50′E
- Country: Russia
- Region: Bryansk Oblast
- District: Karachevsky District
- Time zone: UTC+3:00

Khokhlovka (Russian: Хохловка) is a rural locality (a village) in Karachevsky District, Bryansk Oblast, Russia. The population was 53 as of 2013. There is 1 street.

== Geography ==
Khokhlovka is located 12 km northwest of Karachev (the district's administrative centre) by road. Beryozovka is the nearest rural locality.
