= Zhecha =

Zhecha Жеча
- Settlement
- Location within Bryansk Oblast Location within Russia
- Coordinates: 52°43′N 32°44′E
- Country: Russia
- Region: Bryansk Oblast
- District: Starodubsky District
- Time zone: UTC+3:00

Zhecha (Russian: Жеча) is a rural locality (a settlement) in Starodubsky District, Bryansk Oblast, Russia. The population was 80 as of 2010. There are 4 streets.

== Geography ==
Zhecha is located 16 km north of Starodub (the district's administrative centre) by road. Volny is the nearest rural locality.
