= Nizhneye, Bryansk Oblast =

Nizhneye Нижнее
- Selo
- Location within Bryansk Oblast Location within Russia
- Coordinates: 52°32′N 32°31′E
- Country: Russia
- Region: Bryansk Oblast
- District: Starodubsky District
- Time zone: UTC+3:00

Nizhneye (Russian: Нижнее) is a rural locality (a selo) in Starodubsky District, Bryansk Oblast, Russia. The population was 447 as of 2010. There are 9 streets.

== Geography ==
Nizhneye is located 18 km southwest of Starodub (the district's administrative centre) by road. Istrovka is the nearest rural locality.
