= Olkhovka, Klintsovsky District, Bryansk Oblast =

Olkhovka Ольховка
- Selo
- Location within Bryansk Oblast Location within Russia
- Coordinates: 52°44′N 32°07′E
- Country: Russia
- Region: Bryansk Oblast
- District: Klintsovsky District
- Time zone: UTC+3:00

Olkhovka (Russian: Ольховка) is a rural locality (a selo) in Klintsovsky District, Bryansk Oblast, Russia. The population was 979 as of 2010. There are 18 streets.

== Geography ==
Olkhovka is located 9 km west of Klintsy (the district's administrative centre) by road. Pervoye Maya is the nearest rural locality.
