= Alymova =

Alymova Алымова
- Selo
- Location within Bryansk Oblast Location within Russia
- Coordinates: 53°06′N 35°11′E
- Country: Russia
- Region: Bryansk Oblast
- District: Karachevsky District
- Time zone: UTC+3:00

Alymova (Russian: Алымова) is a rural locality (a selo) in Karachevsky District, Bryansk Oblast, Russia. The population was 186 as of 2010. There are 8 streets.

== Geography ==
Alymova is located 18 km southeast of Karachev (the district's administrative centre) by road. Dolgy is the nearest rural locality.
