= Zemledelets =

Settlement in Bryansk Oblast, Russia

Zemledelets Земледелец
- Settlement
- Location within Bryansk Oblast Location within Russia
- Coordinates: 52°10′N 34°35′E
- Country: Russia
- Region: Bryansk Oblast
- District: Sevsky District
- Time zone: UTC+3:00

Zemledelets (Russian: Земледелец) is a rural locality (a settlement) in Sevsky District, Bryansk Oblast, Russia. The population was 18 as of 2010. There is 1 street.

== Geography ==
Zemledelets is located 15 km east of Sevsk (the district's administrative centre) by road. Krivtsovka is the nearest rural locality.
