= Desyatukha =

Desyatukha Десятуха
- Settlement
- Location within Bryansk Oblast Location within Russia
- Coordinates: 52°35′N 32°50′E
- Country: Russia
- Region: Bryansk Oblast
- District: Starodubsky District
- Time zone: UTC+3:00

Desyatukha (Russian: Десятуха) is a rural locality (a settlement) and the administrative center of Desyatukhovsky Rural Settlement, Starodubsky District, Bryansk Oblast, Russia. The population was 1,263 as of 2010. There are 16 streets.

== Geography ==
Desyatukha is located 6 km east of Starodub (the district's administrative centre) by road. Vodotishche and Levenka is the nearest rural locality.
