= Chekhovka (Russia) =

Chekhovka Чеховка
- Selo
- Location within Bryansk Oblast Location within Russia
- Coordinates: 52°38′N 33°22′E
- Country: Russia
- Region: Bryansk Oblast
- District: Pogarsky District
- Time zone: UTC+3:00

Chekhovka (Russian: Чеховка) is a rural locality (a selo) in Pogarsky District, Bryansk Oblast, Russia. The population was 473 as of 2010. There are 4 streets.

== Geography ==
Chekhovka is located 15 km northeast of Pogar (the district's administrative centre) by road. Glinki is the nearest rural locality.
