= Snovskoye =

Snovskoye Сновское
- Selo
- Location within Bryansk Oblast Location within Russia
- Coordinates: 52°29′N 32°04′E
- Country: Russia
- Region: Bryansk Oblast
- District: Novozybkovsky District
- Time zone: UTC+3:00

Snovskoye (Russian: Сновское) is a rural locality (a selo) in Novozybkovsky District, Bryansk Oblast, Russia. The population was 571 as of 2010. There are 5 streets.

== Geography ==
Snovskoye is located 13 km southeast of Novozybkov (the district's administrative centre) by road. Lakomaya Buda is the nearest rural locality.
