= Setolovo =

Setolovo Сетолово
- Selo
- Location within Bryansk Oblast Location within Russia
- Coordinates: 52°59′N 33°30′E
- Country: Russia
- Region: Bryansk Oblast
- District: Pochepsky District
- Time zone: UTC+3:00

Setolovo (Russian: Сетолово) is a rural locality (a selo) and the administrative center of Setolovskoye Rural Settlement, Pochepsky District, Bryansk Oblast, Russia. In the 19th century the village was part of Alexeevskaya volost, Mglinsky Uyezd, Chernigov Governorate. The population was 494 as of 2010. There are 8 streets.

== Geography ==
Setolovo is located 9 km north of Pochep (the district's administrative centre) by road. Azarovo is the nearest rural locality.
