= Stary Ropsk =

Stary Ropsk Старый Ропск
- Selo
- Location within Bryansk Oblast Location within Russia
- Coordinates: 52°18′N 32°15′E
- Country: Russia
- Region: Bryansk Oblast
- District: Klimovsky District
- Time zone: UTC+3:00

Stary Ropsk (Russian: Старый Ропск) is a rural locality (a selo) in Klimovsky District, Bryansk Oblast, Russia. The population was 185 as of 2013. There are 10 streets.

== Geography ==
Stary Ropsk is located 10 km south of Klimovo (the district's administrative centre) by road. Novy Ropsk is the nearest rural locality.
