= Chaykino, Bryansk Oblast =

Chaykino Чайкино
- Settlement
- Location within Bryansk Oblast Location within Russia
- Coordinates: 52°32′N 33°13′E
- Country: Russia
- Region: Bryansk Oblast
- District: Pogarsky District
- Time zone: UTC+3:00

Chaykino (Russian: Чайкино) is a rural locality (a settlement) in Pogarsky District, Bryansk Oblast, Russia. The population was 479 as of 2010. There are 3 streets.

== Geography ==
Chaykino is located 4 km southwest of Pogar (the district's administrative centre) by road. Graborovka is the nearest rural locality.
