= Mokroye =

Mokroye Мокрое
- Village
- Location within Bryansk Oblast Location within Russia
- Coordinates: 53°06′N 34°51′E
- Country: Russia
- Region: Bryansk Oblast
- District: Karachevsky District
- Time zone: UTC+3:00

Mokroye (Russian: Мокрое) is a rural locality (a village) in Karachevsky District, Bryansk Oblast, Russia. The population was 75 as of 2010. There are 2 streets. The village is mentioned several times in Fyodor Dostoevsky's novel The Brothers Karamazov, located nearby to where most of the novel takes place.

== Geography ==
Mokroye is located 8 km west of Karachev (the district's administrative centre) by road. Trykovka is the nearest rural locality.
