= Staraya Guta =

Staraya Guta Старая Гута
- Selo
- Location within Bryansk Oblast Location within Russia
- Coordinates: 52°49′N 32°31′E
- Country: Russia
- Region: Bryansk Oblast
- District: Unechsky District
- Time zone: UTC+3:00

Staraya Guta (Russian: Старая Гута) is a rural locality (a selo) and the administrative center of Starogutnyanskoye Rural Settlement, Unechsky District, Bryansk Oblast, Russia. The population was 761 as of 2010. There are 18 streets.

== Geography ==
Staraya Guta is located 13 km southwest of Unecha (the district's administrative centre) by road. Robchik is the nearest rural locality.
