= Guta, Zlynkovsky District, Bryansk Oblast =

Guta Гута
- Village
- Location within Bryansk Oblast Location within Russia
- Coordinates: 52°28′N 31°46′E
- Country: Russia
- Region: Bryansk Oblast
- District: Zlynkovsky District
- Time zone: UTC+3:00

Guta (Russian: Гута) is a rural locality (a village) in Zlynkovsky District, Bryansk Oblast, Russia. The population was 69 as of 2010. There are 3 streets.

== Geography ==
Guta is located 8 km north of Zlynka (the district's administrative centre) by road. Muravinka is the nearest rural locality.
