= Dobryn =

Dobryn Добрынь
- Village
- Location within Bryansk Oblast Location within Russia
- Coordinates: 52°20′N 32°02′E
- Country: Russia
- Region: Bryansk Oblast
- District: Klimovsky District
- Time zone: UTC+3:00

Dobryn (Russian: Добрынь) is a rural locality (a village) in Klimovsky District, Bryansk Oblast, Russia. The population was 2 as of 2010.

== Geography ==
Dobryn is located 14 km southwest of Klimovo (the district's administrative centre) by road. Gukov is the nearest rural locality.
