= Bumazhnaya Fabrika =

Bumazhnaya Fabrika Бумажная Фабрика
- Village
- Location within Bryansk Oblast Location within Russia
- Coordinates: 52°54′N 33°25′E
- Country: Russia
- Region: Bryansk Oblast
- District: Pochepsky District
- Time zone: UTC+3:00

Bumazhnaya Fabrika (Russian: Бумажная Фабрика) is a rural locality (a village) in Pochepsky District, Bryansk Oblast, Russia. The population was 276 in 2010. There are five streets.

== Geography ==
Bumazhnaya Fabrika is located 5 km southwest of Pochep (the district's administrative centre) by road. Pochep is the nearest rural locality.
