= Ozarenny =

Ozarenny Озаренный
- Settlement
- Location within Bryansk Oblast Location within Russia
- Coordinates: 52°57′N 33°43′E
- Country: Russia
- Region: Bryansk Oblast
- District: Pochepsky District
- Time zone: UTC+3:00

Ozarenny (Russian: Озаренный) is a rural locality (a settlement) in Pochepsky District, Bryansk Oblast, Russia. The population was 641 as of 2010. There are 6 streets.

== Geography ==
Ozarenny is located 21 km east of Pochep (the district's administrative centre) by road. Krasny Rog is the nearest rural locality.
