= Moskovsky, Pochepsky District, Bryansk Oblast =

Moskovsky Московский
- Settlement
- Location within Bryansk Oblast Location within Russia
- Coordinates: 52°50′N 33°11′E
- Country: Russia
- Region: Bryansk Oblast
- District: Pochepsky District
- Time zone: UTC+3:00

Moskovsky (Russian: Московский) is a rural locality (a settlement) in Pochepsky District, Bryansk Oblast, Russia. The population was 698 as of 2010. There is 1 street.
