= Sennoye, Zlynkovsky District, Bryansk Oblast =

Sennoye Сенное
- Village
- Location within Bryansk Oblast Location within Russia
- Coordinates: 52°30′N 31°39′E
- Country: Russia
- Region: Bryansk Oblast
- District: Zlynkovsky District
- Time zone: UTC+3:00

Sennoye (Russian: Сенное) is a rural locality (a village) in Zlynkovsky District, Bryansk Oblast, Russia. The population was 2 as of 2013.

== Geography ==
Sennoye is located 36 km north of Zlynka (the district's administrative centre) by road. Dobrodeyevka is the nearest rural locality.
