= Mitkovka =

Mitkovka Митьковка
- Selo
- Location within Bryansk Oblast Location within Russia
- Coordinates: 52°26′N 32°09′E
- Country: Russia
- Region: Bryansk Oblast
- District: Klimovsky District
- Time zone: UTC+3:00

Mitkovka (Russian: Митьковка) is a rural locality (a selo) in Klimovsky District, Bryansk Oblast, Russia. The population was 417 as of 2010. There are 12 streets.

== Geography ==
Mitkovka is located 9 km north of Klimovo (the district's administrative centre) by road. Khokhlovka is the nearest rural locality.
