= Sadovy, Vygonichsky District, Bryansk Oblast =

Sadovy Садовый
- Settlement
- Location within Bryansk Oblast Location within Russia
- Coordinates: 53°08′N 34°07′E
- Country: Russia
- Region: Bryansk Oblast
- District: Vygonichsky District
- Time zone: UTC+3:00

Sadovy (Russian: Садовый) is a rural locality (a settlement) in Vygonichsky District, Bryansk Oblast, Russia. The population was 286 as of 2010. There are 4 streets.

== Geography ==
Sadovy is located 9 km northeast of Vygonichi (the district's administrative centre) by road. Skryabino is the nearest rural locality.
