= Vishnyovoye =

Vishnyovoye Вишнёвое
- Village
- Location within Bryansk Oblast Location within Russia
- Coordinates: 52°45′N 33°08′E
- Country: Russia
- Region: Bryansk Oblast
- District: Unechsky District
- Time zone: UTC+3:00

Vishnyovoye (Russian: Вишнёвое) is a rural locality (a village) in Unechsky District, Bryansk Oblast, Russia. The population was 16 as of 2010. There are 2 streets.

== Geography ==
Vishnyovoye is located 38 km southeast of Unecha (the district's administrative centre) by road. Starye Ivaytyonki is the nearest rural locality.
