= Vesenny, Bryansk Oblast =

Vesenny Весенний
- Settlement
- Location within Bryansk Oblast Location within Russia
- Coordinates: 52°57′N 33°46′E
- Country: Russia
- Region: Bryansk Oblast
- District: Pochepsky District
- Time zone: UTC+3:00

Vesenny (Russian: Весенний) is a rural locality (a settlement) in Pochepsky District, Bryansk Oblast, Russia. The population was 192 as of 2010. There are 3 streets.

== Geography ==
Vesenny is located 25 km northeast of Pochep (the district's administrative centre) by road. Dom Otdykha is the nearest rural locality.
