= Zhiryatinsky District =

Zhiryatinsky District Жирятинский район (Russian)
- District
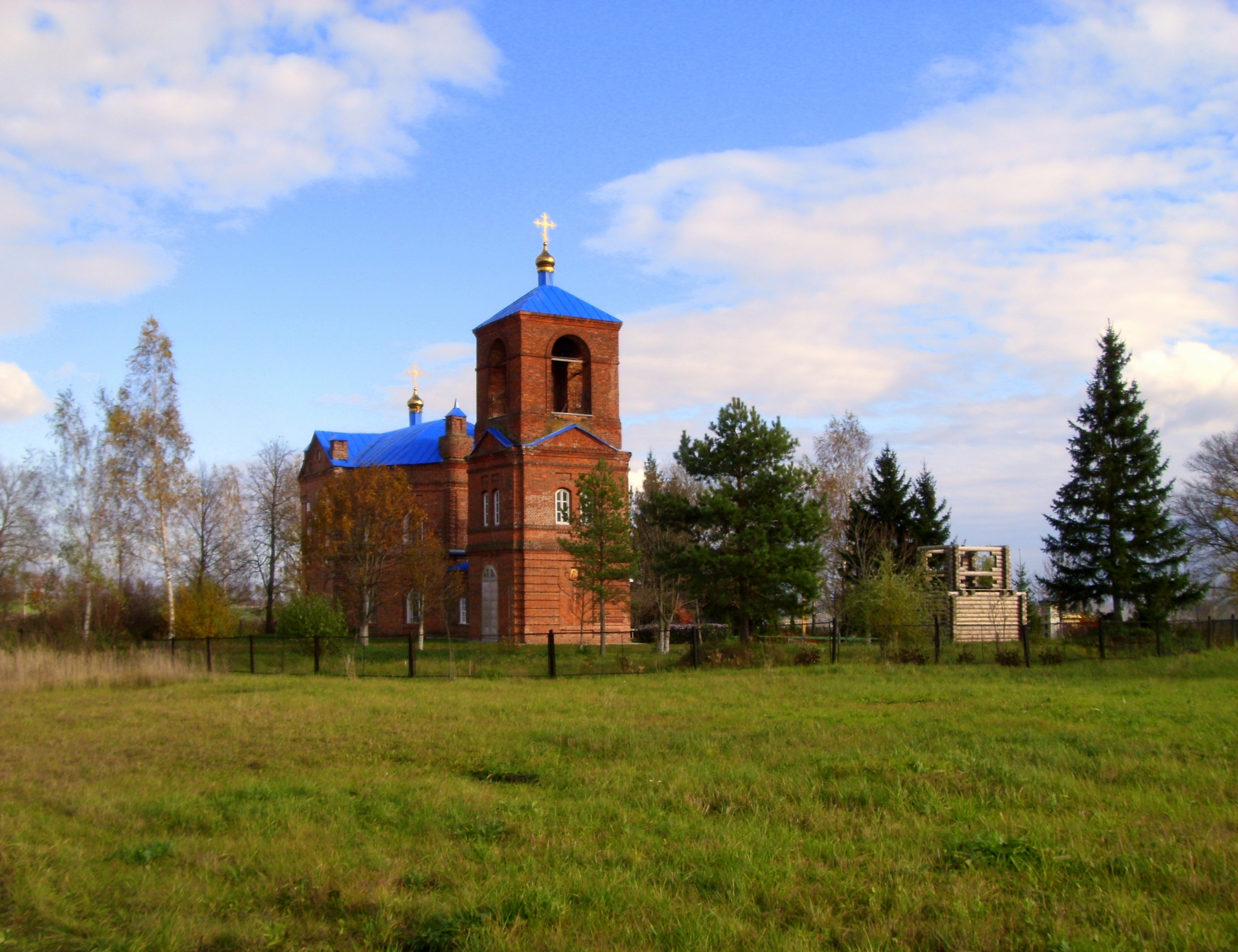
- Transfiguration Church, Zhiryatinsky District

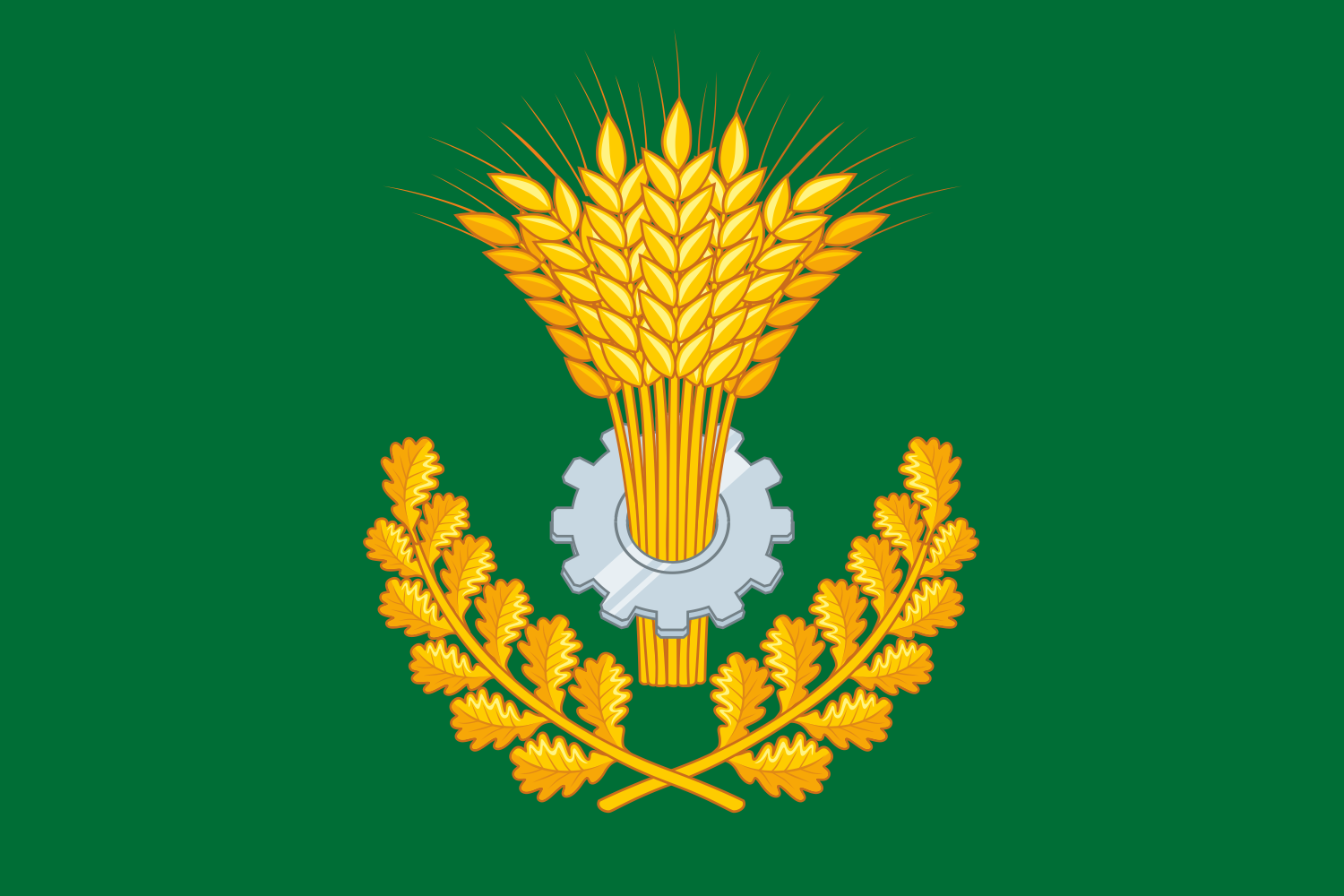
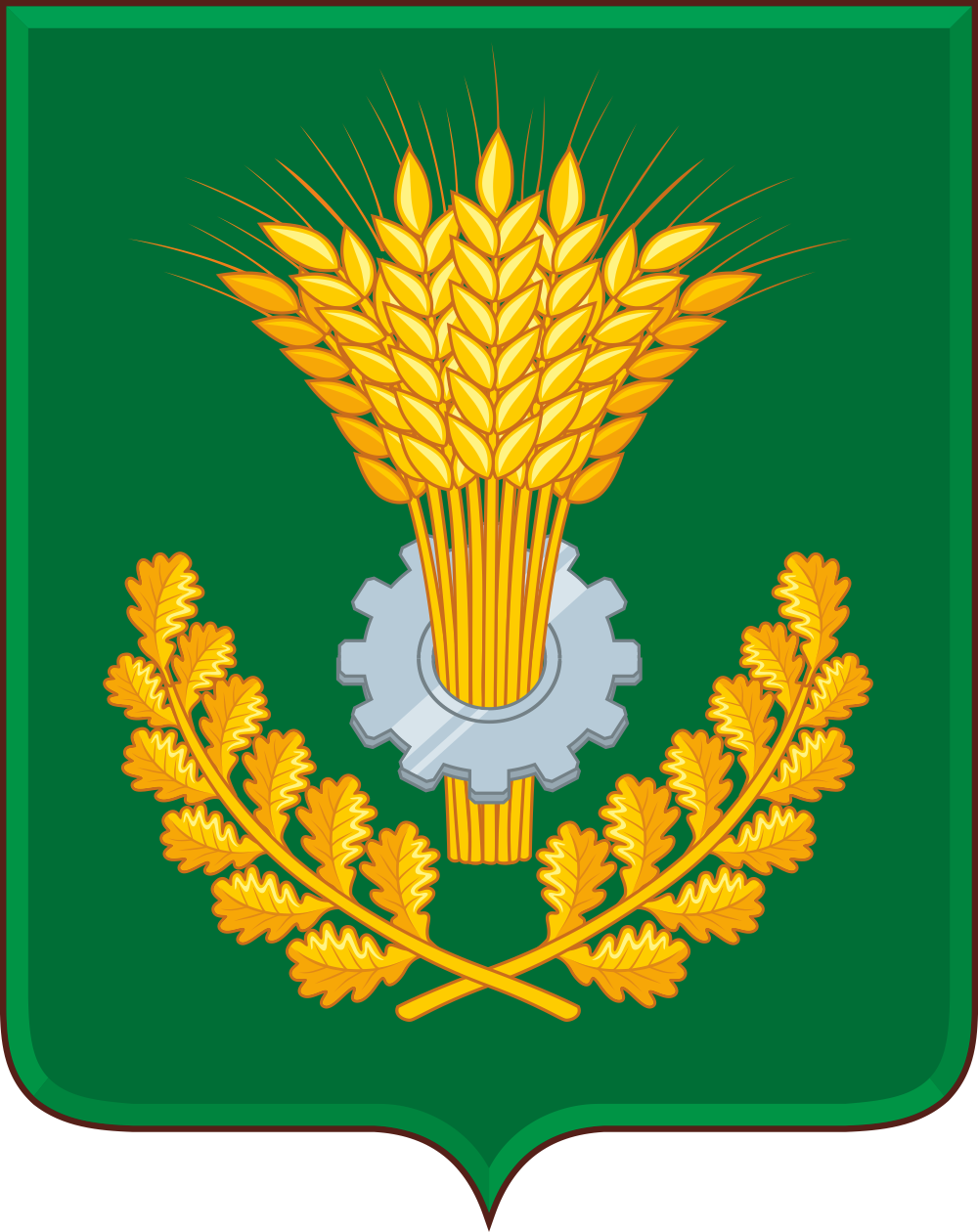
- Flag Coat of arms
- Location of Zhiryatinsky District in Bryansk Oblast
- Coordinates: 53°13′30″N 33°43′45″E
- Country: Russia
- Federal subject: Bryansk Oblast
- Administrative center: Zhiryatino

Area
  - Total: 742 km^{2} (286 sq mi)

Population (2010 Census)
  - Total: 7,442
  - Density: 10.0/km^{2} (26.0/sq mi)
  - Urban: 0%
  - Rural: 100%

Administrative structure
  - Administrative divisions: 3 Rural administrative okrugs
  - Inhabited localities: 77 rural localities

Municipal structure
  - Municipally incorporated as: Zhiryatinsky Municipal District
  - Municipal divisions: 0 urban settlements, 3 rural settlements
- Time zone: UTC+3 (MSK)
- OKTMO ID: 15620000
- Website: http://www.juratino.ru/

Zhiryatinsky District (Russian: Жирятинский райо́н) is an administrative and municipal district (raion), one of the twenty-seven in Bryansk Oblast, Russia. It is located in the center of the oblast. The area of the district is 742 square kilometers (286 sq mi). Its administrative center is the rural locality (a selo) of Zhiryatino. Population: 6,568 (2021 census); 7,442 (2010 census); 8,207 (2002 Census); 8,796 (1989 Soviet census). The population of Zhiryatino accounts for 34.1% of the district's population.
