= Zhiryatino, Bryansk Oblast =

Rural locality in Bryansk Oblast, Russia

Zhiryatino Жирятино
- Town
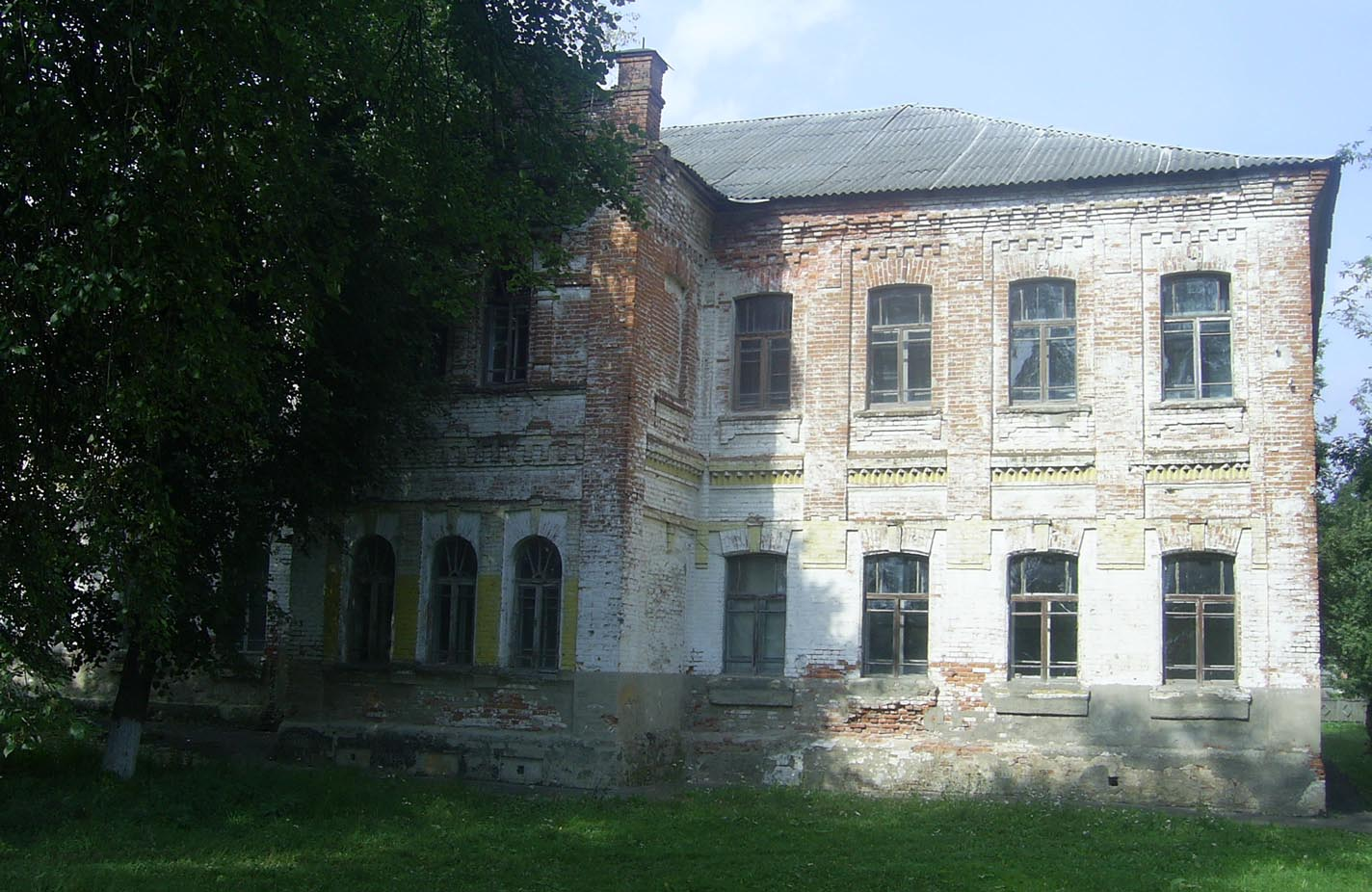
- School in the village, built in 1875
- Interactive map of Zhiryatino
- Location of Zhiryatino Zhiryatino (Bryansk Oblast)
- Coordinates: 53°13′32″N 33°44′05″E
- Country: Russia
- Federal subject: Bryansk Oblast

Population (2010 Census)
  - Total: 2,409
  - Estimate (2013): 2,501 (+3.8%)

Administrative status
  - Capital of: Zhiryatinsky District

Municipal status
  - Municipal district: Zhiryatinsky Municipal District
  - Capital of: Zhiryatinsky Municipal District
- Time zone: UTC+3 (MSK)
- Postal code: 242030
- Dialing code: +7 48344
- OKTMO ID: 15620420101

Zhiryatino (Russian: Жирятино) is a rural locality (a selo) and the administrative center of Zhiryatinsky District, Bryansk Oblast, Russia. Population: 2,537 (2010 census); 2,371 (2002 census); 1,725 (1989 Soviet census).
