= Dubrovsky District =

Dubrovsky District Дубровский район (Russian)
- District
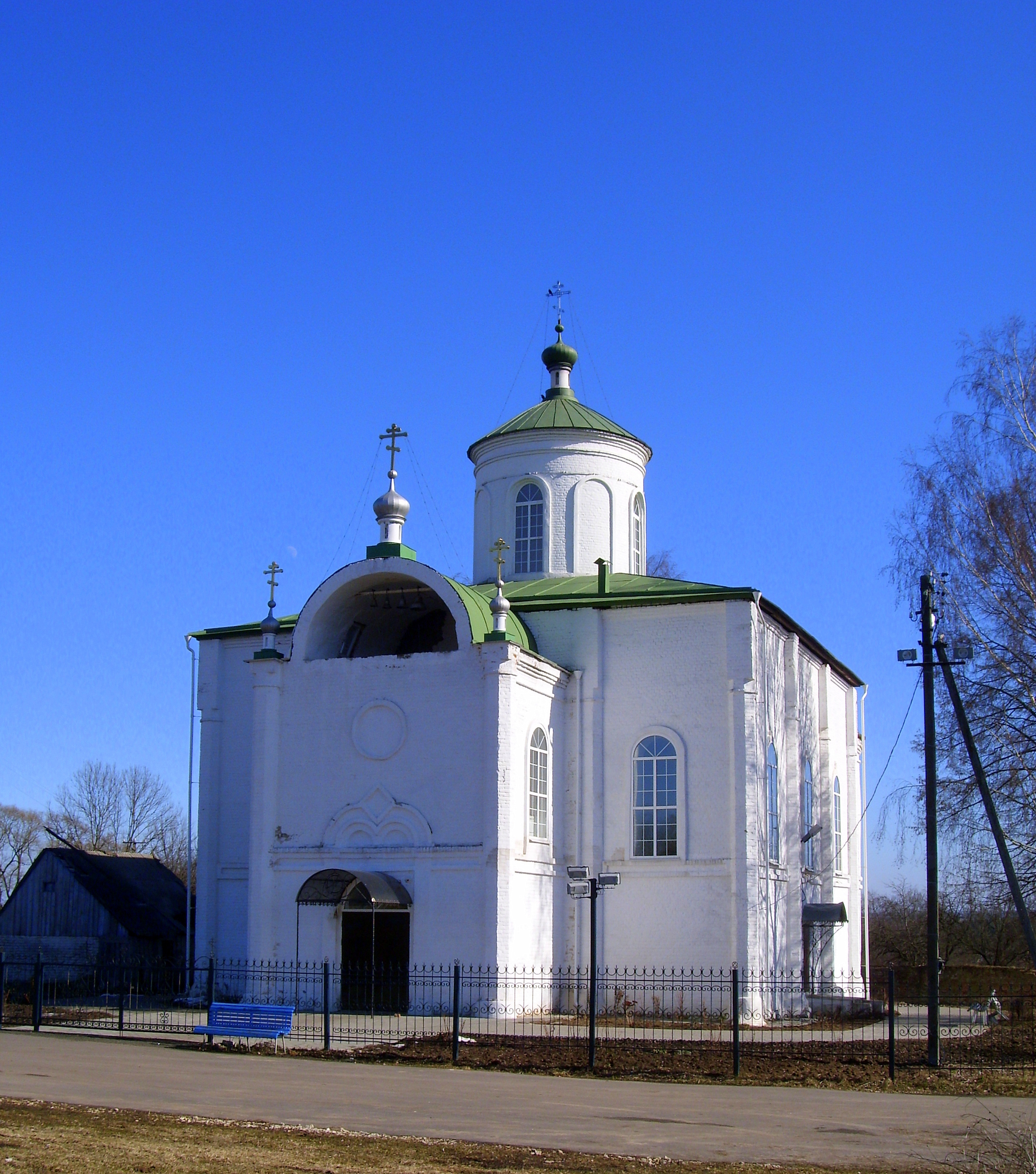
- Trinity Church

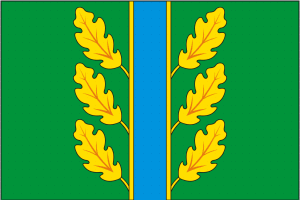
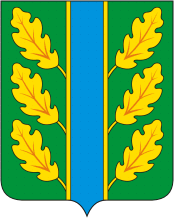
- Flag Coat of arms
- Location of Dubrovsky District in Bryansk Oblast
- Coordinates: 53°41′N 33°31′E
- Country: Russia
- Federal subject: Bryansk Oblast
- Administrative center: Dubrovka

Area
  - Total: 1,028 km^{2} (397 sq mi)

Population (2010 Census)
  - Total: 20,094
  - Density: 19.55/km^{2} (50.63/sq mi)
  - Urban: 39.9%
  - Rural: 60.1%

Administrative structure
  - Administrative divisions: 1 Settlement administrative okrugs, 6 Rural administrative okrugs
  - Inhabited localities: 1 urban-type settlements, 112 rural localities

Municipal structure
  - Municipally incorporated as: Dubrovsky Municipal District
  - Municipal divisions: 1 urban settlements, 6 rural settlements
- Time zone: UTC+3 (MSK)
- OKTMO ID: 15612000
- Website: http://admdubrovka.ru

Dubrovsky District (Russian: Ду́бровский райо́н) is an administrative and municipal district (raion), one of the twenty-seven in Bryansk Oblast, Russia. It is located in the north of the oblast. The area of the district is 1,028 square kilometers (397 sq mi). Its administrative center is the urban locality (a work settlement) of Dubrovka. Population: 14,910 (2021 census); 20,094 (2010 census); 23,145 (2002 Census); 21,694 (1989 Soviet census). The population of Dubrovka accounts for 45.6% of the district's total population.
