= Mglinsky Uyezd =

Subdivision of Chernigov Governorate, Russian Empire

Mglinsky Uyezd (Russian: Мглинский уезд, romanized: Mglinskiy uezd) or Mhlyn Povit (Ukrainian: Мглинський повіт, romanized: Mhlynskyi povit) was one of the subdivisions of the Chernigov Governorate of the Russian Empire. It was situated in the northeastern part of the governorate. Its administrative centre was Mglin.

The governorate was incorporated into the Ukrainian SSR, and part of it including the Mglinsky Uyezd was transferred to the Gomel Oblast of the Russian SFSR in 1919.

== Demographics ==
At the time of the Russian Empire Census of 1897, Mglinsky Uyezd had a population of 139,343. Of these, 78.2% spoke Russian, 14.2% Belarusian, 7.3% Yiddish, 0.1% Romani, 0.1% Ukrainian and 0.1% Polish as their native language.
