= Dubrovka, Dubrovsky Settlement Administrative Okrug, Dubrovsky District, Bryansk Oblast =

Dubrovka Дубровка
- Town
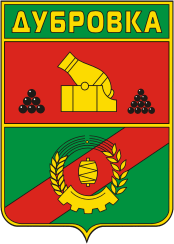
- Coat of arms
- Interactive map of Dubrovka
- Location of Dubrovka Dubrovka (Bryansk Oblast)
- Coordinates: 53°41′29″N 33°30′42″E
- Country: Russia
- Federal subject: Bryansk Oblast
- Founded: 1868
- Town status since: 2012

Population (2010 Census)
  - Total: 8,015
  - Estimate (2025): 6,520 (−18.7%)

Municipal status
  - Municipal district: Dubrovsky Municipal District
  - Urban settlement: Dubrovsky Urban Settlement
  - Capital of: Dubrovsky Municipal District, Dubrovsky Urban Settlement
- Time zone: UTC+3 (MSK)
- Postal code: 242750
- Dialing code: +7 48332
- OKTMO ID: 15612151051

Dubrovka (Russian: Ду́бровка) is a settlement in Bryansk Oblast, Russia. Population: 6,793 (2021 census).

The town is located on Sesche on the river, a tributary of the Desna River. Railway station is located on the Bryansk-Smolensk line, 81 kilometers north-west of Bryansk.

== History ==
The settlement was founded in 1868 in connection with the construction of the Oryol-Vitebsk railroad (the station was named after a nearby village). In the 1880s there were industries including distillery, sawmill, mills, churns. In 1912, twine factory was built.

In 1929 it became the district center and in 1931 it was granted an urban-type settlement status.

In 2012 its status was demoted to 'settlement'.
