= Komarichi =

Urban locality in Bryansk Oblast, Russia

Komarichi Комаричи
- Urban-type settlement
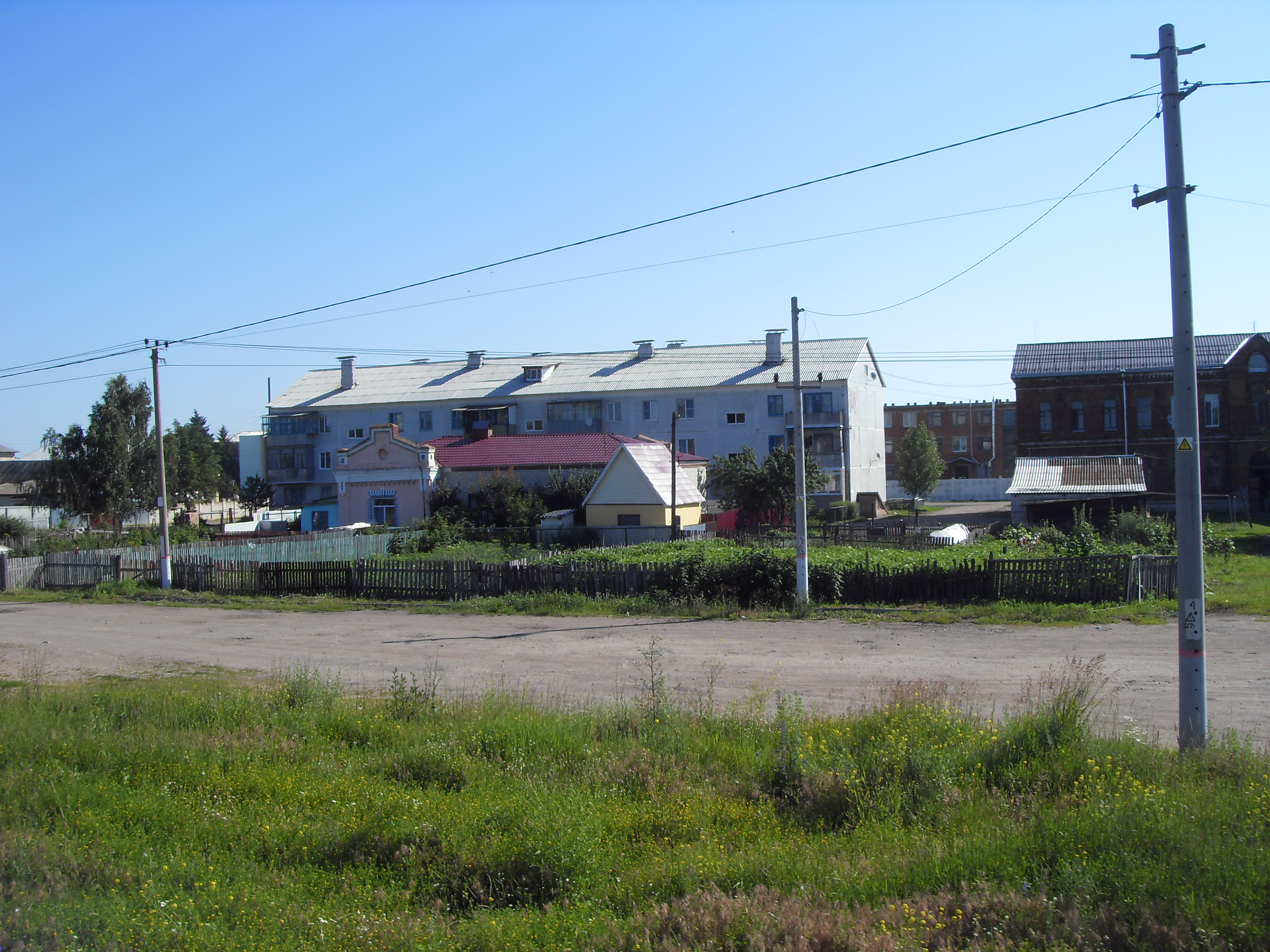

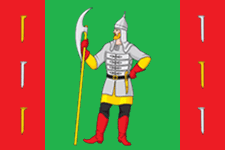
- Flag
- Interactive map of Komarichi
- Location of Komarichi Komarichi (Bryansk Oblast)
- Coordinates: 52°25′07″N 34°47′34″E
- Country: Russia
- Federal subject: Bryansk Oblast
- Administrative district: Komarichsky District

Population (2010 Census)
  - Total: 7,686
  - Estimate (2025): 7,238 (−5.8%)
- Time zone: UTC+3 (MSK)
- Postal code: 242400
- OKTMO ID: 15632151051

Komarichi (Russian: Кома́ричи) is an urban-type settlement and the administrative center of Komarichsky District, Bryansk Oblast, Russia. Population: 7,325 (2021 census); 7,686 (2010 census); 7,234 (2002 census); 8,053 (1989 Soviet census).
