= Navlya, Bryansk Oblast =

Navlya Навля
- Town
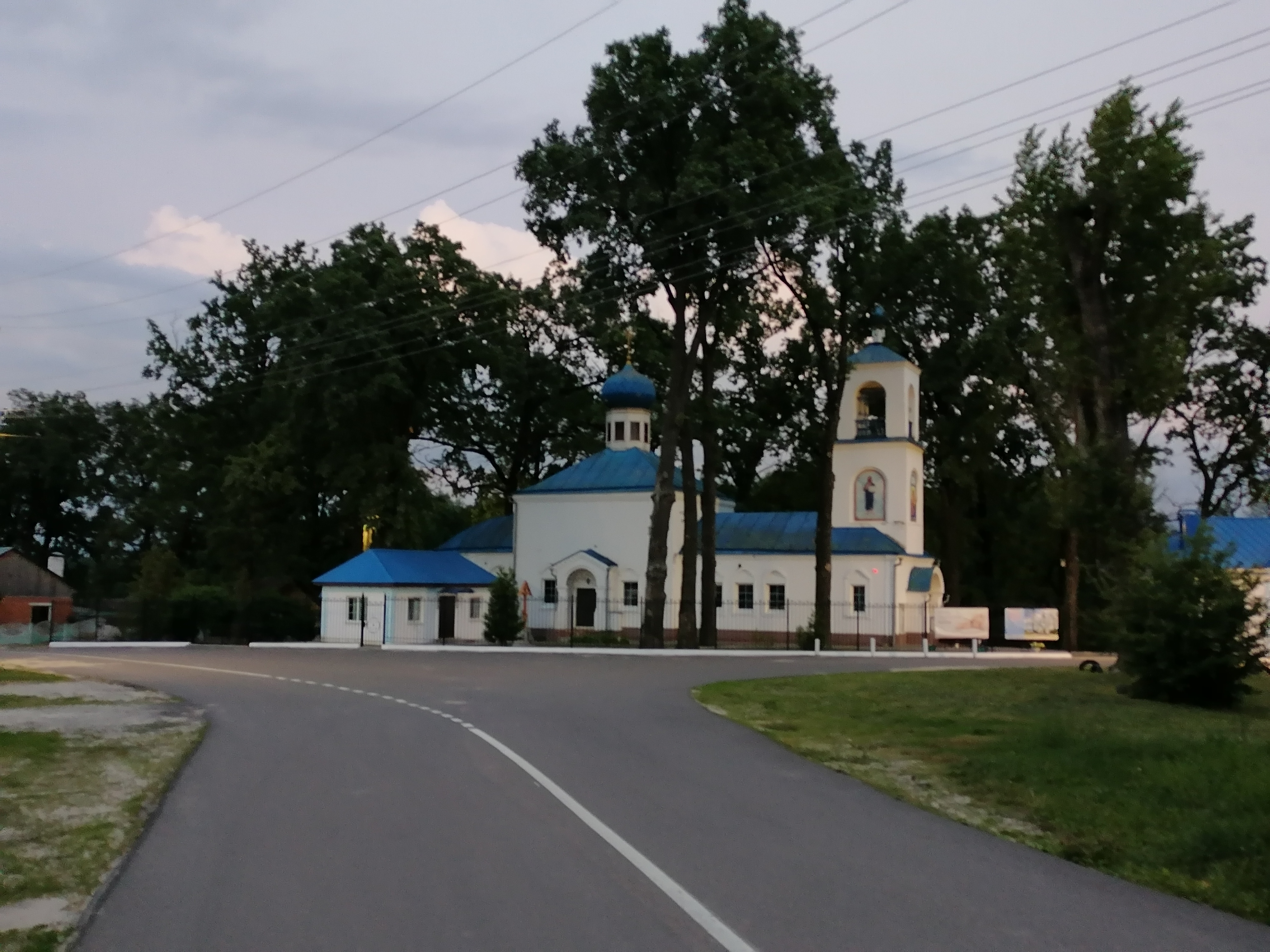

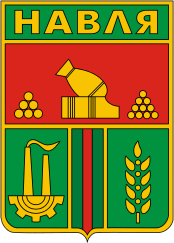
- Coat of arms
- Interactive map of Navlya
- Location of Navlya Navlya (Bryansk Oblast)
- Coordinates: 52°49′41″N 34°29′56″E
- Country: Russia
- Federal subject: Bryansk Oblast
- Founded: 1904
- Town status since: 1938

Population (2010 Census)
  - Total: 14,361
  - Estimate (2025): 15,380 (+7.1%)

Municipal status
  - Municipal district: Navlinsky Municipal District
  - Urban settlement: Navlinsky Urban Settlement
  - Capital of: Navlinsky Municipal District, Navlinsky Urban Settlement
- Time zone: UTC+3 (MSK)
- Postal code: 242130
- Dialing code: +7 48342
- OKTMO ID: 15638151051

Navlya (Russian: На́вля) is an urban-type settlement in Bryansk Oblast, Russia. It is the administrative center of Navlinsky District. Population: 15,536 (2021 census); 14,361 (2010 census); 14,014 (2002 census); 13,709 (1989 Soviet census).

== History ==
The town was founded in 1904 in connection with the construction of the Moscow-Kiev-Voronezh railway. Since 1938 the settlement is mostly urban.

During the German occupation in World War II, from November 1941 to September 1943, it was part of Navlya Lokotskogo District. Guerrilla groups were active in the woods near Navlya, While an underground Komsomol group operated in the town.

A unmanned combat aerial vehicle launching base was established 2025 in the vicinity of Navlya at 52.856100°N 34.519810°E

== Economy ==
In the settlement there are several industries including a repair plant, Auto Aggregate Plant (manufacture of driveshafts), Factory "Promsvyaz" (manufacture of machinery for the construction of cable lines), Food Factory, conducted asphalt production and harvesting.

== Place of interest ==
In Navlya there is the Museum of Partisan Glory, underground guerrillas monument "Memory Wall" with a bust of the commander of one of the groups, Peter Derevyanko, as well as a monument to the soldiers of the 10th separate tank brigade of the Bryansk Front-based around an IS-2 tank mounted on a pedestal. In addition, in the town is a monument to Lenin, the stele in honor of the liberation of the city, a monument and burial of defenders and civilians Navlya on the forecourt. Knyazev is a monument to the defenders of the city, in the park. Derevianko - a monument to the liquidators of the Chernobyl accident.
