= Kletnya =

Kletnya Клетня
- Town
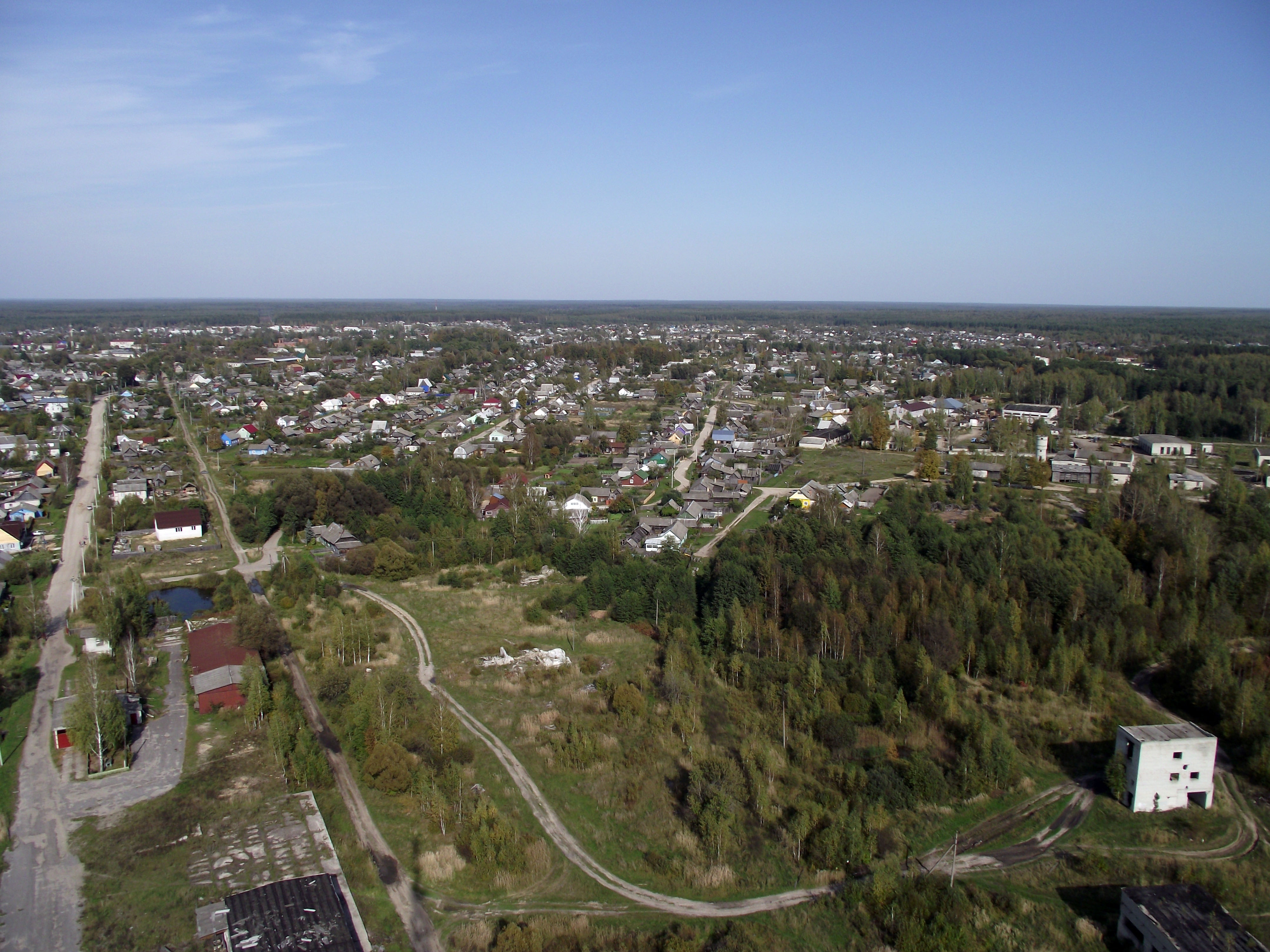
- Aerial view of Kletnya

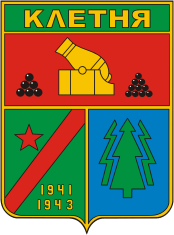
- Coat of arms
- Interactive map of Kletnya
- Location of Kletnya Kletnya (Bryansk Oblast)
- Coordinates: 53°23′00″N 33°12′00″E
- Country: Russia
- Federal subject: Bryansk Oblast
- 1880: 1880
- Town status since: 1935

Population (2010 Census)
  - Total: 13,313
  - Estimate (2025): 11,497 (−13.6%)

Municipal status
  - Municipal district: Kletnyansky Municipal District
  - Urban settlement: Kletnyansky Urban Settlement
  - Capital of: Kletnyansky Municipal District, Kletnyansky Urban Settlement
- Time zone: UTC+3 (MSK)
- Postal code: 242820
- Dialing code: +7 48338
- OKTMO ID: 15626151051

Kletnya (Russian: Клетня) is an urban-type settlement and the administrative centre of Kletnyansky District, in Bryansk Oblast, Russia. It is located on the Nadva River (Dnieper basin), 99 km west of the city of Bryansk. It is the final railway station on the branch line that connects Kletnya with Zhukovka, 43 km away, where it joins the main line between Bryansk and Smolensk. Population: 11,947 (2021 census); 13,313 (2010 census); 13,936 (2002 census); 14,258 (1989 Soviet census).

== History ==
The town was founded as Lyudinka (Russian: Людинка) in 1880, in connection with the start of logging in the region. In 1918 it was designated as a rural centre in Bryansky Uyezd, and since 1929 it has been the administrative centre of Kletnyansky District. In 1935 it was granted the status of an urban-type settlement.

During the Great Patriotic War the forests in the region were one of the centers of the partisan movement. On 28 June 2012 the town was awarded the honorary title "Settlement of Partisan Glory" by the regional government.
