= Glinishchevo =

Rural locality in Bryansk Oblast, Russia

Coordinates: 53°18′03″N 34°05′12″E

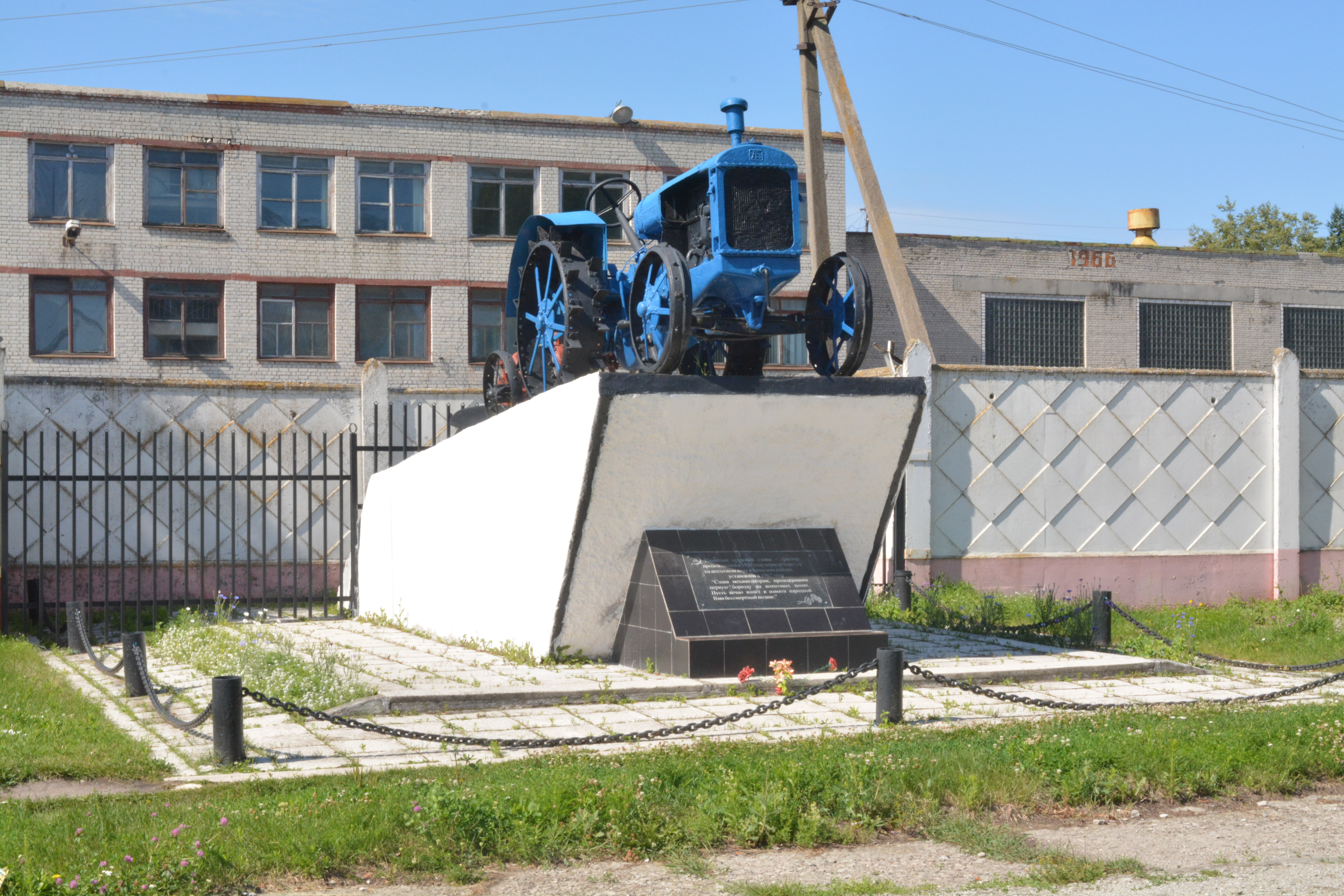
KhTZ tractor, which laid the first furrow on a collective farm field in the Bryansk region: Glinishchevo, Bryansk district, Bryansk region

Glinishchevo (Russian: Глинищево) is a rural locality (a selo) and the administrative center of Bryansky District, Bryansk Oblast, Russia. Population: 4,348 (2021 census); 4,367 (2010 census); 4,241 (2002 census);
