= Administrative divisions of Bryansk Oblast =

Divisions of Bryansk Oblast, Russia

Bryansk Oblast Russia
- Administrative centre: Bryansk

Administrative structure (as of 2013)
- Districts: 27
- Cities/towns: 16
- Urban-type settlements: 23
- Selsovets: 421

Municipal structure (as of 2002)
- Rural settlements: 2,688 (inhabited); 98 (uninhabited)

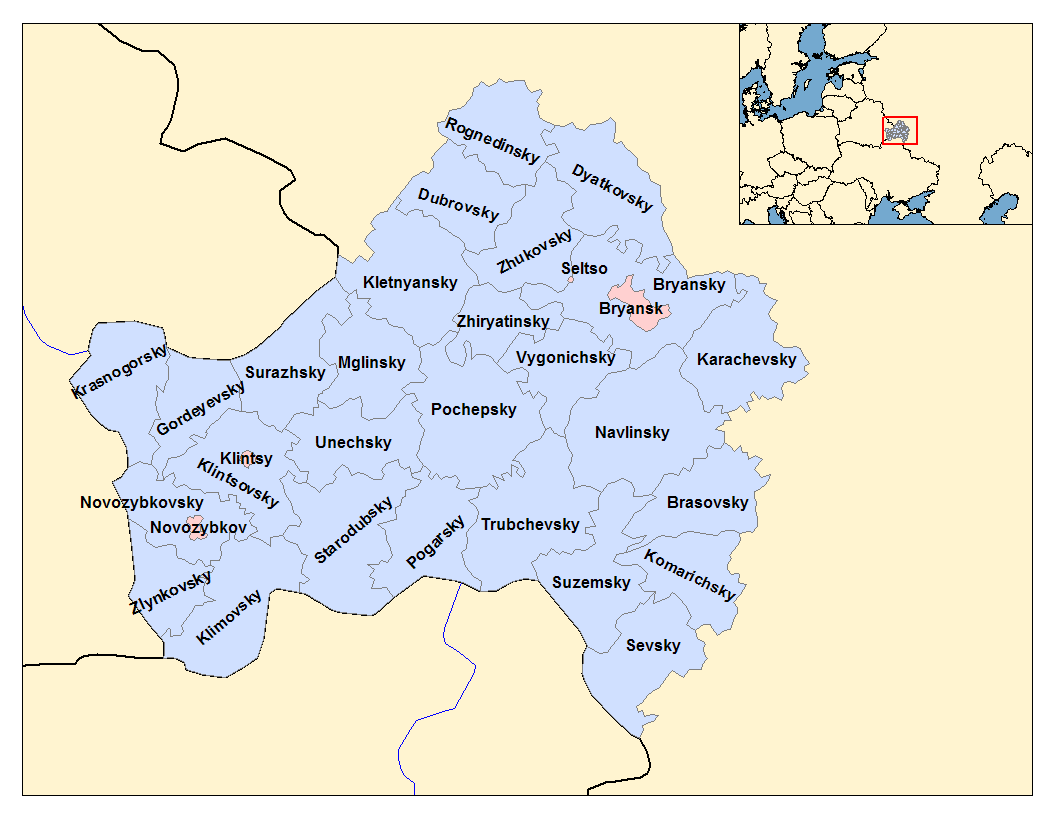
Administrative divisions of Bryansk Oblast

Bryansk Oblast is a federal subject of Russia.

== Administrative and municipal divisions ==
- Cities and towns of oblast significance:
  - Bryansk (Брянск) (administrative center)
    - city districts:
      - Bezhitsky (Бежицкий)
        - Urban-type settlements under the city district's jurisdiction:
          - Raditsa-Krylovka (Радица-Крыловка)
      - Fokinsky (Фокинский)
        - Urban-type settlements under the city district's jurisdiction:
          - Belye Berega (Белые Берега)
      - Sovetsky (Советский)
      - Volodarsky (Володарский)
        - Urban-type settlements under the city district's jurisdiction:
          - Bolshoye Polpino (Большое Полпино)
  - Fokino (Фокино)
  - Klintsy (Клинцы)
  - Novozybkov (Новозыбков)
  - Seltso (Сельцо)
- Districts:
  - Brasovsky (Брасовский)
    - Urban-type settlements under the district's jurisdiction:
      - Lokot (Локоть)
    - with 13 selsovets under the district's jurisdiction.
  - Bryansky (Брянский)
    - with 15 selsovets under the district's jurisdiction.
  - Dubrovsky (Дубровский)
    - Urban-type settlements under the district's jurisdiction:
      - Dubrovka (Дубровка)
    - with 10 selsovets under the district's jurisdiction.
  - Dyatkovsky (Дятьковский)
    - Towns under the district's jurisdiction:
      - Dyatkovo (Дятьково)
    - Urban-type settlements under the district's jurisdiction:
      - Bytosh (Бытошь)
      - Ivot (Ивот)
      - Lyubokhna (Любохна)
      - Star (Старь)
    - with 8 selsovets under the district's jurisdiction.
  - Gordeyevsky (Гордеевский)
    - with 14 selsovets under the district's jurisdiction.
  - Karachevsky (Карачевский)
    - Towns under the district's jurisdiction:
      - Karachev (Карачев)
    - with 13 selsovets under the district's jurisdiction.
  - Kletnyansky (Клетнянский)
    - Urban-type settlements under the district's jurisdiction:
      - Kletnya (Клетня)
    - with 16 selsovets under the district's jurisdiction.
  - Klimovsky (Климовский)
    - Urban-type settlements under the district's jurisdiction:
      - Klimovo (Климово)
    - with 23 selsovets under the district's jurisdiction.
  - Klintsovsky (Клинцовский)
    - with 20 selsovets under the district's jurisdiction.
  - Komarichsky (Комаричский)
    - Urban-type settlements under the district's jurisdiction:
      - Komarichi (Комаричи)
    - with 17 selsovets under the district's jurisdiction.
  - Krasnogorsky (Красногорский)
    - Urban-type settlements under the district's jurisdiction:
      - Krasnaya Gora (Красная Гора)
    - with 17 selsovets under the district's jurisdiction.
  - Mglinsky (Мглинский)
    - Towns under the district's jurisdiction:
      - Mglin (Мглин)
    - with 21 selsovets under the district's jurisdiction.
  - Navlinsky (Навлинский)
    - Urban-type settlements under the district's jurisdiction:
      - Altukhovo (Алтухово)
      - Navlya (Навля)
    - with 18 selsovets under the district's jurisdiction.
  - Novozybkovsky (Новозыбковский)
    - with 17 selsovets under the district's jurisdiction.
  - Pochepsky (Почепский)
    - Towns under the district's jurisdiction:
      - Pochep (Почеп)
    - Urban-type settlements under the district's jurisdiction:
      - Ramasukha (Рамасуха)
    - with 26 selsovets under the district's jurisdiction.
  - Pogarsky (Погарский)
    - Urban-type settlements under the district's jurisdiction:
      - Pogar (Погар)
    - with 20 selsovets under the district's jurisdiction.
  - Rognedinsky (Рогнединский)
    - Urban-type settlements under the district's jurisdiction:
      - Rognedino (Рогнедино)
    - with 10 selsovets under the district's jurisdiction.
  - Sevsky (Севский)
    - Towns under the district's jurisdiction:
      - Sevsk (Севск)
    - with 16 selsovets under the district's jurisdiction.
  - Starodubsky (Стародубский)
    - Towns under the district's jurisdiction:
      - Starodub (Стародуб)
    - with 21 selsovets under the district's jurisdiction.
  - Surazhsky (Суражский)
    - Towns under the district's jurisdiction:
      - Surazh (Сураж)
    - with 15 selsovets under the district's jurisdiction.
  - Suzemsky (Суземский)
    - Urban-type settlements under the district's jurisdiction:
      - Kokorevka (Кокоревка)
      - Suzemka (Суземка)
    - with 11 selsovets under the district's jurisdiction.
  - Trubchevsky (Трубчевский)
    - Towns under the district's jurisdiction:
      - Trubchevsk (Трубчевск)
    - Urban-type settlements under the district's jurisdiction:
      - Belaya Beryozka (Белая Берёзка)
    - with 17 selsovets under the district's jurisdiction.
  - Unechsky (Унечский)
    - Towns under the district's jurisdiction:
      - Unecha (Унеча)
    - with 18 selsovets under the district's jurisdiction.
  - Vygonichsky (Выгоничский)
    - Urban-type settlements under the district's jurisdiction:
      - Vygonichi (Выгоничи)
    - with 14 selsovets under the district's jurisdiction.
  - Zhiryatinsky (Жирятинский)
    - with 10 selsovets under the district's jurisdiction.
  - Zhukovsky (Жуковский)
    - Towns under the district's jurisdiction:
      - Zhukovka (Жуковка)
    - with 12 selsovets under the district's jurisdiction.
  - Zlynkovsky (Злынковский)
    - Towns under the district's jurisdiction:
      - Zlynka (Злынка)
    - Urban-type settlements under the district's jurisdiction:
      - Vyshkov (Вышков)
    - with 9 selsovets under the district's jurisdiction.
