= Novozybkov =

Town in Bryansk Oblast, Russia

Novozybkov Новозыбков
- Town
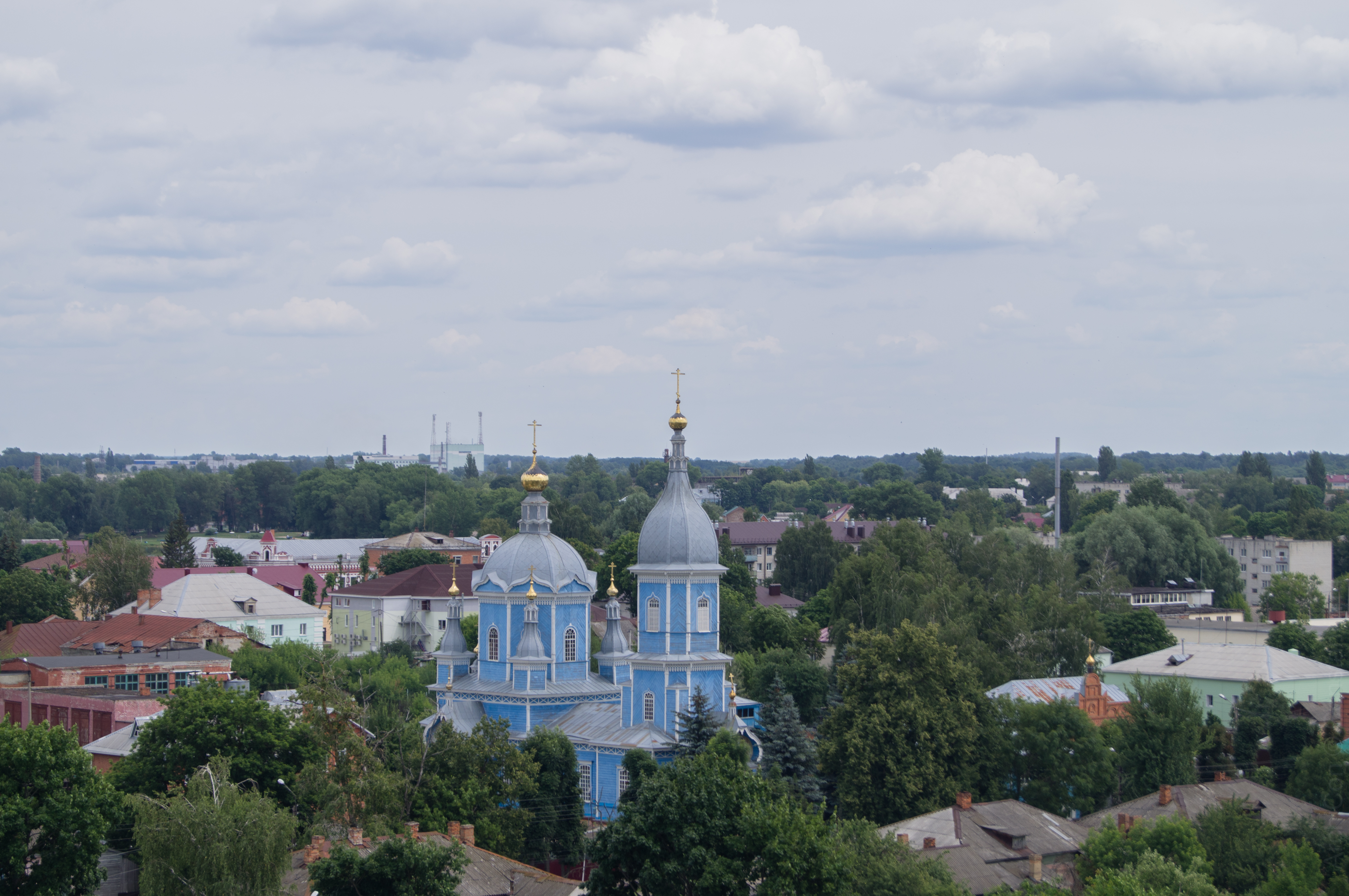
- View of the Transfiguration Church in the town

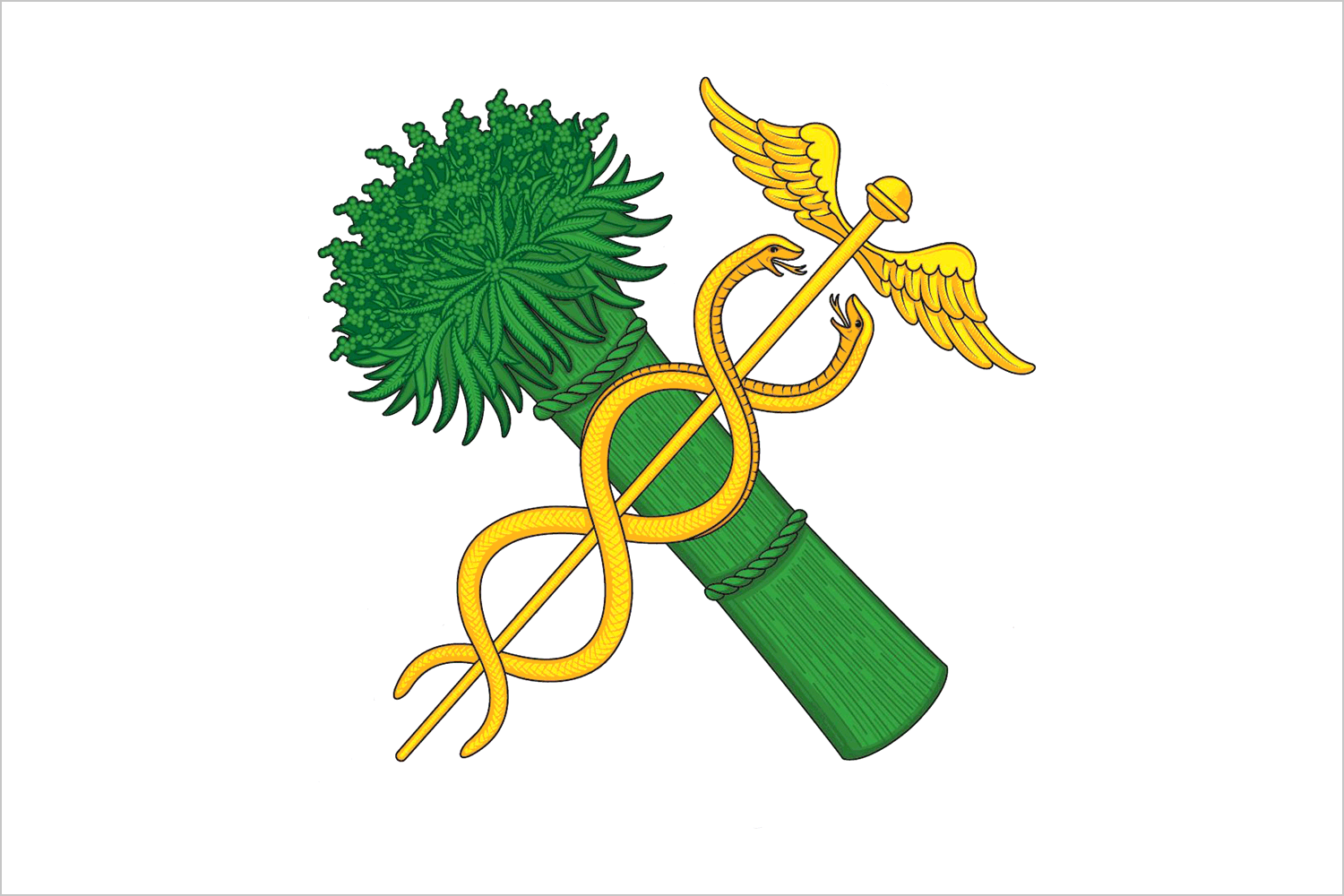
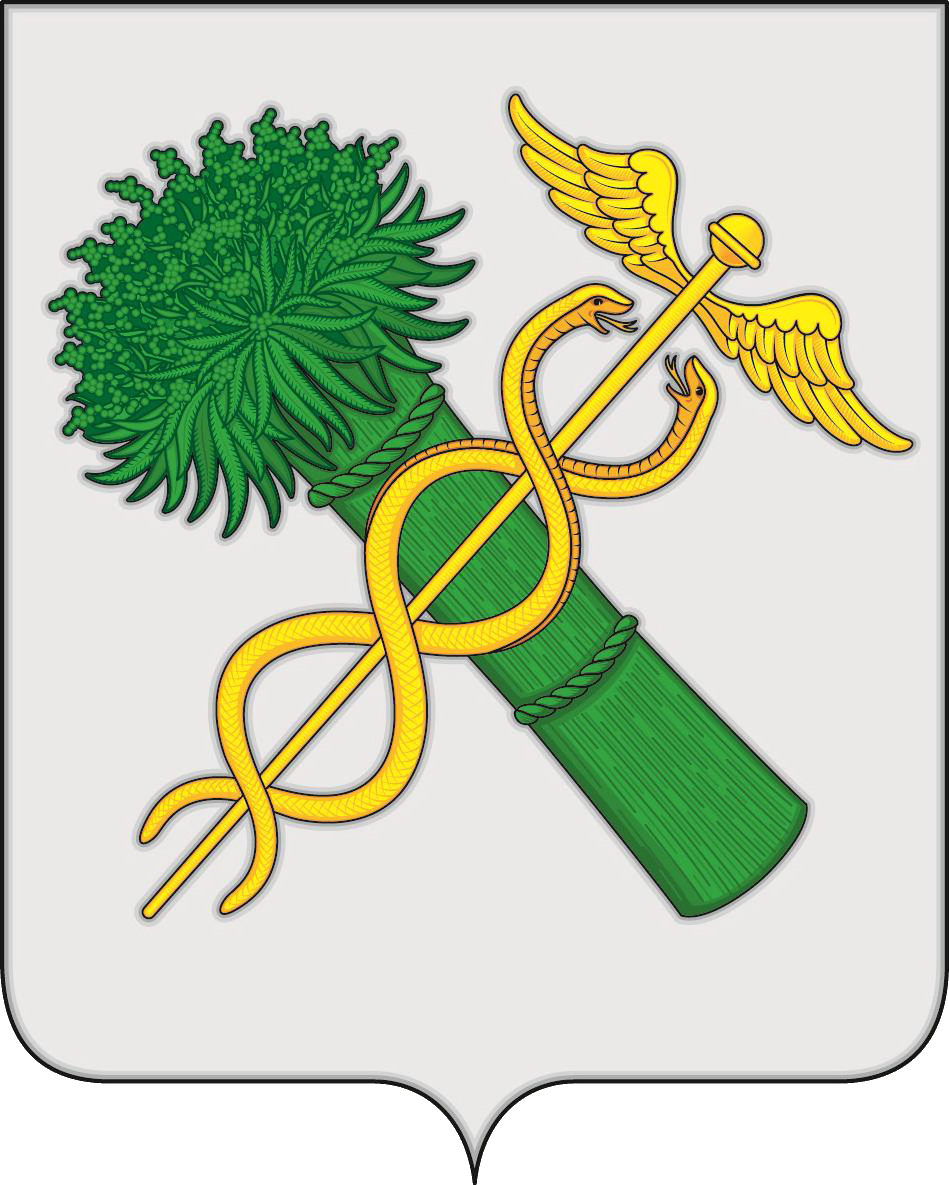
- Flag Coat of arms
- Interactive map of Novozybkov
- Location of Novozybkov Novozybkov (Bryansk Oblast)
- Coordinates: 52°32′N 31°56′E
- Country: Russia
- Federal subject: Bryansk Oblast
- Founded: 1701
- Town status since: 1809

Area
  - Total: 34.13 km^{2} (13.18 sq mi)
- Elevation: 160 m (520 ft)

Population (2010 Census)
  - Total: 40,553
  - Estimate (2025): 37,852 (−6.7%)
  - Density: 1,188/km^{2} (3,077/sq mi)

Administrative status
  - Subordinated to: Novozybkovsky Urban Administrative Okrug (town of oblast significance)
  - Capital of: Novozybkovsky Urban Administrative Okrug, Novozybkovsky District

Municipal status
  - Urban okrug: Novozybkov Urban Okrug
  - Capital of: Novozybkov Urban Okrug, Novozybkovsky Municipal District
- Time zone: UTC+3 (MSK)
- Postal code: 243020
- OKTMO ID: 15720000001

Novozybkov (Russian: Новозы́бков; Belarusian: Навазыбкаў) is a historical town in Bryansk Oblast, Russia with a population, in 2021, of 38,680.

The city is home to a branch of the Bryansk State University.

== History ==
It was founded in 1701 and was granted town status in 1809.

Novozybkov was a major hemp supplier in the 18th and 19th centuries, particularly for the production of ropes for the Imperial Russian Navy. Following the Crimean War, the demand for hemp fell, and cultivation stopped altogether at the beginning of the 20th century.

During World War II, Novozybkov was occupied by the German Army from 16 August 1941 to 25 September 1943. The Jewish population of Novozybkov, about 10% of the total population, were reported to have been rounded up and executed in Karkhovskiy Forest.

On April 26, 1986, Novozybkovsky District and the neighbouring Krasnogorsky District were contaminated with radioactive fallout from the Chernobyl disaster. Today, these two areas remain the most contaminated in the Russian Federation as to the total contaminated area and the intensity of contamination (curies per km^{2}). The area not suitable for human habitation (more than 40 Ci/km^{2} (1.5 MBq/m^{2})) starts at 1 km west of Novozybkov city limits.

== Ecological problems ==
As a result of the Chernobyl disaster on April 26, 1986, part of the territory of Bryansk Oblast has been contaminated with radionuclides (mainly Gordeyevsky, Klimovsky, Klintsovsky, Krasnogorsky, Surazhsky, and Novozybkovsky Districts). In 1999, some 226,000 people lived in areas with the contamination level above 5 Ci/km^{2} (0.19 MBq/m^{2}), representing approximately 16% of the oblast's population.

== Population ==
The population of Novozybkov was 38,680 (2021 census); 40,553 (2010 census); 43,038 (2002 census); 44,854 (1989 Soviet census).

The population is in decline, with an average annual loss of 207 people between 1989 and 2021.

== Administrative and municipal status ==
Within the framework of administrative divisions, Novozybkov serves as the administrative center of Novozybkovsky District, even though it is not a part of it.

As an administrative division, it is incorporated separately as Novozybkovsky Urban Administrative Okrug—an administrative unit with the status equal to that of the districts.

As a municipal division, Novozybkovsky Urban Administrative Okrug is incorporated as Novozybkov Urban Okrug.

== Notable people ==
- Aleksandra Belcova (1892–1981), painter
- David Dragunsky (1910–1992), general
- Grigori Roshal (1899–1983), film director and screenwriter
- Mariya Sergeyenko (1891–1987), scholar of Roman history and philologist
- Oscar Leschinsky (1892–1919), poet, artist, Bolshevik revolutionary and commissar, executed in Dagestan
- Rostislav Alexeyev (1916–1980), designer of high-speed shipbuilding
- Samson Samsonov (1921–2002), film director and screenwriter
- Sascha Schapiro (1890–1942), Jewish Russian anarchist revolutionary
