= Krasnaya Gora, Krasnogorsky District, Bryansk Oblast =

Krasnaya Gora Красная Гора
- Town
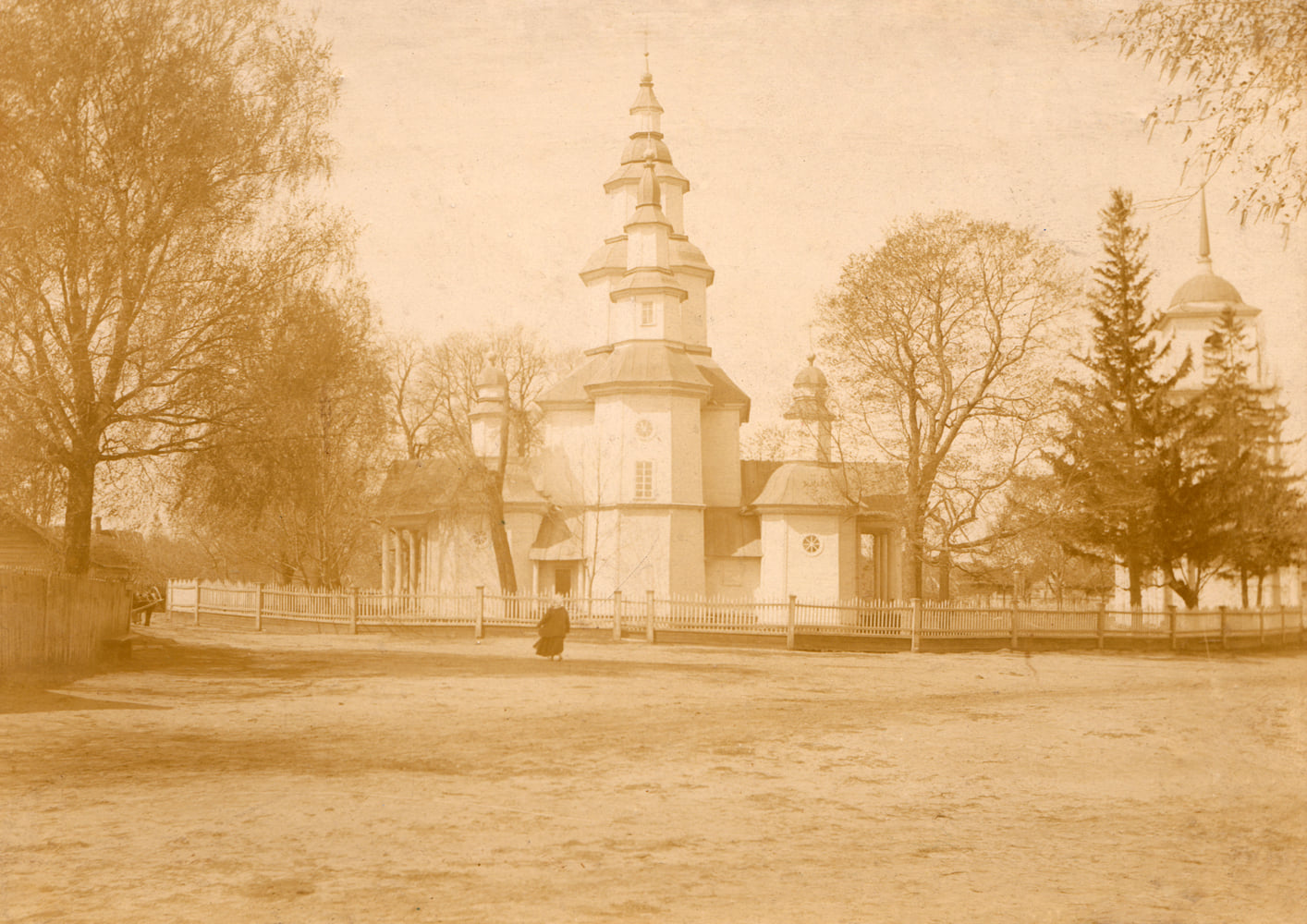
- Interactive map of Krasnaya Gora
- Location of Krasnaya Gora Krasnaya Gora (Bryansk Oblast)
- Coordinates: 53°00′00″N 31°36′00″E
- Country: Russia
- Federal subject: Bryansk Oblast
- First mentioned: 1168
- Town status since: 1986

Population (2010 Census)
  - Total: 5,906
  - Estimate (2025): 5,352 (−9.4%)

Administrative status
  - Capital of: Town of oblast significance of Borisovka, Rognedinsky District<

Municipal status
  - Municipal district: Rognedinsky Municipal District
  - Urban settlement: Rognedinsky Urban Settlement
  - Capital of: Rognedinsky Municipal District, Krasnogorsky Urban Settlement
- Time zone: UTC+3 (MSK)
- Postal code: 242770
- Dialing code: +7 48331
- OKTMO ID: 15634151051

Krasnaya Gora (Russian: Кра́сная Гора́) is an urban-type settlement in Bryansk Oblast, Russia. It is the administrative center of Krasnogorsky District. Population: 5,504 (2021 census); 5,906 (2010 census); 6,599 (2002 census); 6,909 (1989 Soviet census).

== History ==
First mentioned in 1387 as a guard settlement. Listed in the "List of Ruthenian Cities Far and Near". In 1648 Popov Gora hosted a fight between Cossacks of Bohdan Khmelnytsky and six thousandth detachment of Polish Hetman Vishnevetzky.

In the past century, Popova Gora was sotnia center Popogorskoy hundreds and parish center Popovogorskoy parish. Since 1929 as the regional center. Since 1968, it is settlement of urban type.

== Ecological problems ==
As a result of the Chernobyl disaster on April 26, 1986, part of the territory of Bryansk Oblast has been contaminated with radionuclides (mainly Gordeyevsky, Klimovsky, Klintsovsky, Krasnogorsky, Surazhsky, and Novozybkovsky Districts). In 1999, some 226,000 people lived in areas with the contamination level above 5 Curie/km^{2}, representing approximately 16% of the oblast's population.
