= Zlynkovsky District =

Zlynkovsky District Злынковский район (Russian)
- District
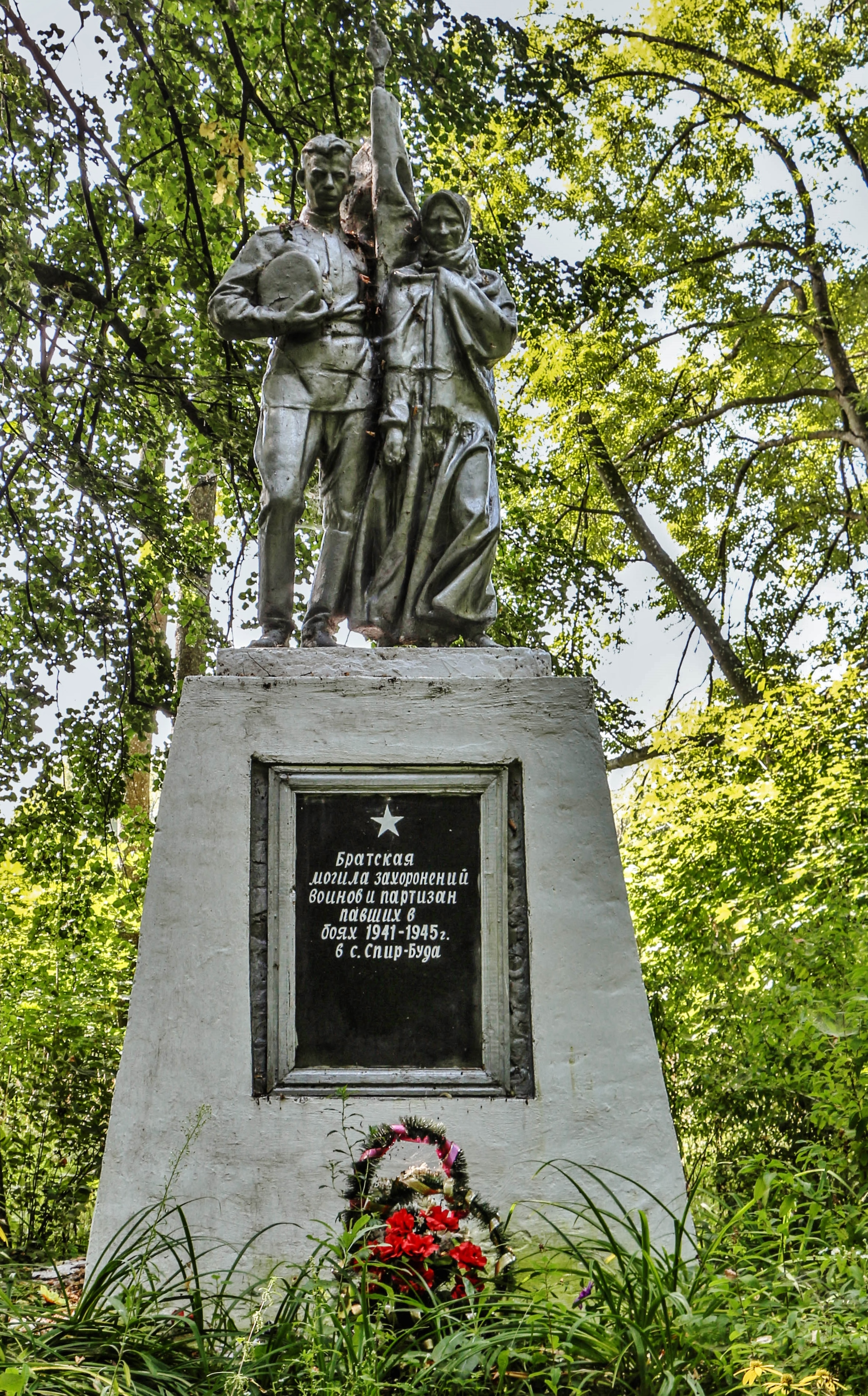
- War memorial in Zlynovsky District

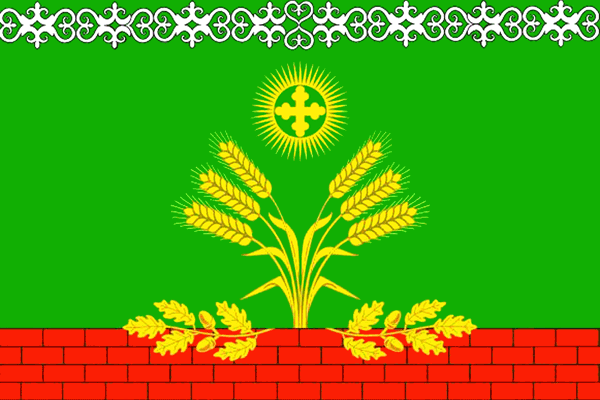
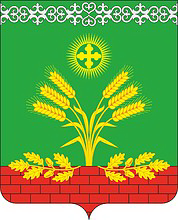
- Flag Coat of arms
- Location of Zlynkovsky District in Bryansk Oblast
- Coordinates: 52°26′N 31°44′E
- Country: Russia
- Federal subject: Bryansk Oblast
- Established: 1939
- Administrative center: Zlynka

Area
  - Total: 741 km^{2} (286 sq mi)

Population (2010 Census)
  - Total: 12,917
  - Density: 17.4/km^{2} (45.1/sq mi)
  - Urban: 63.5%
  - Rural: 36.5%

Administrative structure
  - Administrative divisions: 1 Urban administrative okrugs, 1 Settlement administrative okrugs, 4 Rural administrative okrugs
  - Inhabited localities: 1 cities/towns, 1 urban-type settlements, 40 rural localities

Municipal structure
  - Municipally incorporated as: Zlynkovsky Municipal District
  - Municipal divisions: 2 urban settlements, 4 rural settlements
- Time zone: UTC+3 (MSK)
- OKTMO ID: 15623000
- Website: http://admzlynka.ru/

Zlynkovsky District (Russian: Злы́нковский райо́н) is an administrative and municipal district (raion), one of the twenty-seven in Bryansk Oblast, Russia. It is located in the southwest of the oblast. The area of the district is 741 square kilometers (286 sq mi). Its administrative center is the town of Zlynka. Population: 11,610 (2021 census); 12,917 (2010 census); 14,056 (2002 Census); 17,205 (1989 Soviet census). The population of Zlynka accounts for 45.4% of the district's total population.

== Ecological problems ==
As a result of the Chernobyl disaster on April 26, 1986, part of the territory of Bryansk Oblast has been contaminated with radionuclides (mainly Zlynkovsky, Gordeyevsky, Klimovsky, Klintsovsky, Krasnogorsky, Surazhsky, and Novozybkovsky Districts). In 1999, some 226,000 people lived in areas with the contamination level above 5 Curie/km^{2}, representing approximately 16% of the oblast's population.
