= Zlynka =

Town in Bryansk Oblast, Russia

Zlynka Злынка
- Town
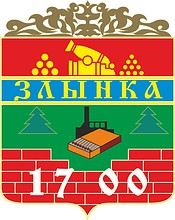
- Coat of arms
- Interactive map of Zlynka
- Location of Zlynka Zlynka (European Russia) Zlynka (Russia)
- Coordinates: 52°25′N 31°44′E
- Country: Russia
- Federal subject: Bryansk Oblast
- Administrative district: Zlynkovsky District
- Urban Administrative OkrugSelsoviet: Zlynkovsky
- Founded: 1702
- Town status since: 1925
- Elevation: 150 m (490 ft)

Population (2010 Census)
  - Total: 5,507
  - Estimate (2021): 5,270 (−4.3%)

Administrative status
  - Capital of: Zlynkovsky District, Zlynkovsky Urban Administrative Okrug

Municipal status
  - Municipal district: Zlynkovsky Municipal District
  - Urban settlement: Zlynkovskoye Urban Settlement
  - Capital of: Zlynkovsky Municipal District, Zlynkovskoye Urban Settlement
- Time zone: UTC+3 (MSK)
- Postal code: 243600
- Dialing code: +7 48358
- OKTMO ID: 15623101001
- Website: adm-zlynka.narod.ru

Zlynka (Russian: Злы́нка) is a town and the administrative center of Zlynkovsky District in Bryansk Oblast, Russia, located on the Zlynka River 225 kilometers (140 mi) southwest of Bryansk, the administrative center of the oblast, and close to the border with Belarus. Population: 5,270 (2021 census); 5,507 (2010 census); 5,372 (2002 census); 5,586 (1989 Soviet census).

== History ==
Historically, the territory at various times formed part of Lithuania, Muscovy, the Polish–Lithuanian Commonwealth and Russia.

It was founded in 1702 as a settlement of Old Believers. It was administratively located in the Starodub Regiment of the Cossack Hetmanate. Town status was granted to it in 1925.

There were 432 Jews living in Zlynka before World War II. The village was occupied by the German army in late August 1941. Half of the Jews were able to evacuate before the Germans’ arrival. The execution of Jews from the village started in September 1941, when 27 Jewish men were shot on the outskirts of the village by a special mobile squad unit. In October, all the remaining Jews were confined to the ghetto for a few months. The liquidation of the ghetto took place in mid-February 1942, when between 190 and 200 Jews were most likely shot by local policemen who fired with pistols. The Germans also operated a forced labour battalion for Jews in the town.

In 1986, it was heavily affected by radioactive fallout as a result of the 1986 Chernobyl disaster. Full resettlement of the town was considered. Economy and further development of the town were hit hard.

== Administrative and municipal status ==
Within the framework of administrative divisions, Zlynka serves as the administrative center of Zlynkovsky District. As an administrative division, it is, together with two rural localities, incorporated within Zlynkovsky District as Zlynkovsky Urban Administrative Okrug. As a municipal division, Zlynkovsky Urban Administrative Okrug is incorporated within Zlynkovsky Municipal District as Zlynkovskoye Urban Settlement.

== Ecological problems ==
As a result of the Chernobyl disaster on April 26, 1986, part of the territory of Bryansk Oblast has been contaminated with radionuclides (mainly Gordeyevsky, Klimovsky, Klintsovsky, Krasnogorsky, Surazhsky, and Novozybkovsky Districts). In 1999, some 226,000 people lived in areas with the contamination level above 5 Curie/km^{2}, representing approximately 16% of the oblast's population.
