= Star, Russia =

Star (Russian: Старь) is the name of several inhabited localities in Russia:

Urban localities

- Star, Bryansk Oblast, a work settlement in Dyatkovsky District of Bryansk Oblast; 53°38′N 34°09′E

Rural localities

- Star, Novgorod Oblast, a village in Marevskoye Settlement of Maryovsky District in Novgorod Oblast
