= Luzhki =

Luzhki Лужки
- Settlement
- Location within Bryansk Oblast Location within Russia
- Coordinates: 52°30′N 32°09′E
- Country: Russia
- Region: Bryansk Oblast
- District: Klimovsky District
- Time zone: UTC+3:00

Luzhki (Russian: Лужки) is a rural locality (a settlement) in Klimovsky District, Bryansk Oblast, Russia. The population was 14 as of 2010. There is one street.

== Geography ==
Luzhki is located 21 km north of Klimovo (the district's administrative centre) by road. Lakomaya Buda is the nearest rural locality.

== See also ==
- Luzhki (disambiguation)
