= Zlynkovsky =

Zlynkovsky (masculine), Zlynkovskaya (feminine), or Zlynkovskoye (neuter) may refer to:

- Zlynkovsky District, a district of Bryansk Oblast, Russia
- Zlynkovsky Urban Administrative Okrug, an administrative division which the town of Zlynka and two rural localities in Zlynkovsky District of Bryansk Oblast, Russia are incorporated as
- Zlynkovskoye Urban Settlement, a municipal formation which Zlynkovsky Urban Administrative Okrug in Zlynkovsky District of Bryansk Oblast, Russia is incorporated as
