= Klimovo, Bryansk Oblast =

Klimovo Климово
- Town
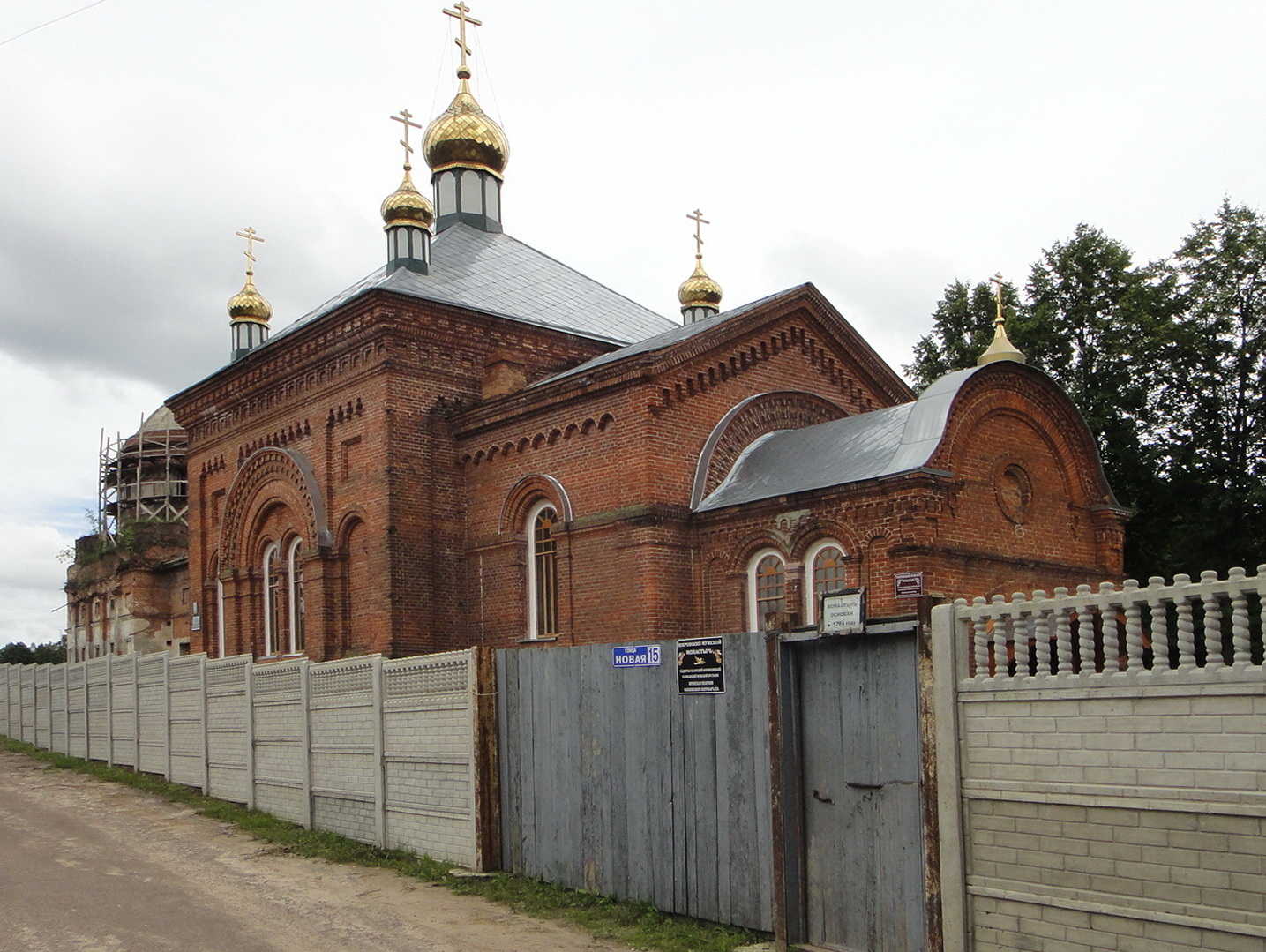
- Intercession monastery

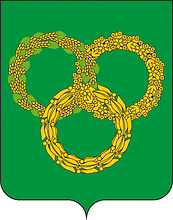
- Coat of arms
- Interactive map of Klimovo
- Location of Klimovo Klimovo (European Russia) Klimovo (Russia)
- Coordinates: 52°23′N 32°11′E
- Country: Russia
- Federal subject: Bryansk Oblast
- Founded: 1708
- Town status since: 1938
- Elevation: 160 m (520 ft)

Population
  - Estimate (2025): 13,054 )
  - Density: 800/km^{2} (2,100/sq mi)

Administrative status
  - Capital of: Klimovsky District
- Time zone: UTC+3 (MSK)
- Postal code: 243040
- Dialing code: +7 48347
- OKTMO ID: 15628151051
- Website: klimadm.ru

Klimovo (Russian: Кли́мово) is an urban-type settlement in Bryansk Oblast, Russia. Population: 13,554 (2021 census); 13,892 (2010 census); 14,776 (2002 census); 14,637 (1989 Soviet census). There is a daily railway connection to Moscow via Bryansk, however the train station name is Klimov, not Klimovo.

The Old Believer church of Saint Demetrius is a sightseeing point.

== History ==
It was founded in 1708 by Klim Ermolaevich. It was granted town status in 1938. From 1929 Klimovo is a center of Klimovo district.

During World War II, Klimovo was occupied by the German Army from 25 August 1941 to 24 September 1943. The 1939 census recorded that the Jewish population was 224, or 4 percent of the total. During that time a half of Jewish population fled on the East and men joined the army.

On 29 August 1941, 27 Jews accused of being Bolshevist agents were shot. In October 1941, a ghetto was created and it was liquidated in March 1942. During the liquidation about 280 Jews were executed by German security forces. They were shot in a peat quarry, about 1 kilometre (0.62 mi) away from Klimovo. Afterwards isolated shootings took place until the German withdrawal in September, 1943.

On 14 April 2022, Russia claimed that Ukrainian attack helicopters attacked the settlement. Russian authorities said helicopters bombarded residential areas six times, damaging six buildings. The local hospital said seven people were injured, two of them seriously. Ukrainian authorities rejected Russian claims and stated that Russia had staged "terror attacks" on its own population to whip up "anti-Ukrainian hysteria". The incident happened amid an invasion of Ukraine by the Russian Federation.

== Ecological problems ==
As a result of the Chernobyl disaster on April 26, 1986, part of the territory of Bryansk Oblast has been contaminated with radionuclides (mainly Gordeyevsky, Klimovsky, Klintsovsky, Krasnogorsky, Surazhsky, and Novozybkovsky Districts). In 1999, some 226,000 people lived in areas with the contamination level above 5 Curie/km^{2}, representing approximately 16% of the oblast's population.
