= Luzhki (disambiguation) =

Luhzki may refer to:

- Luzhki
- Luzhki, Sharkawshchyna district
- Luzhki, Melenkovsky District, Vladimir Oblast
- Luzhki, Unechsky District, Bryansk Oblast
- Luzhki, Starodubsky District, Bryansk Oblast
- Luzhki, Palekhsky District, Ivanovo Oblast
