= Bolva =

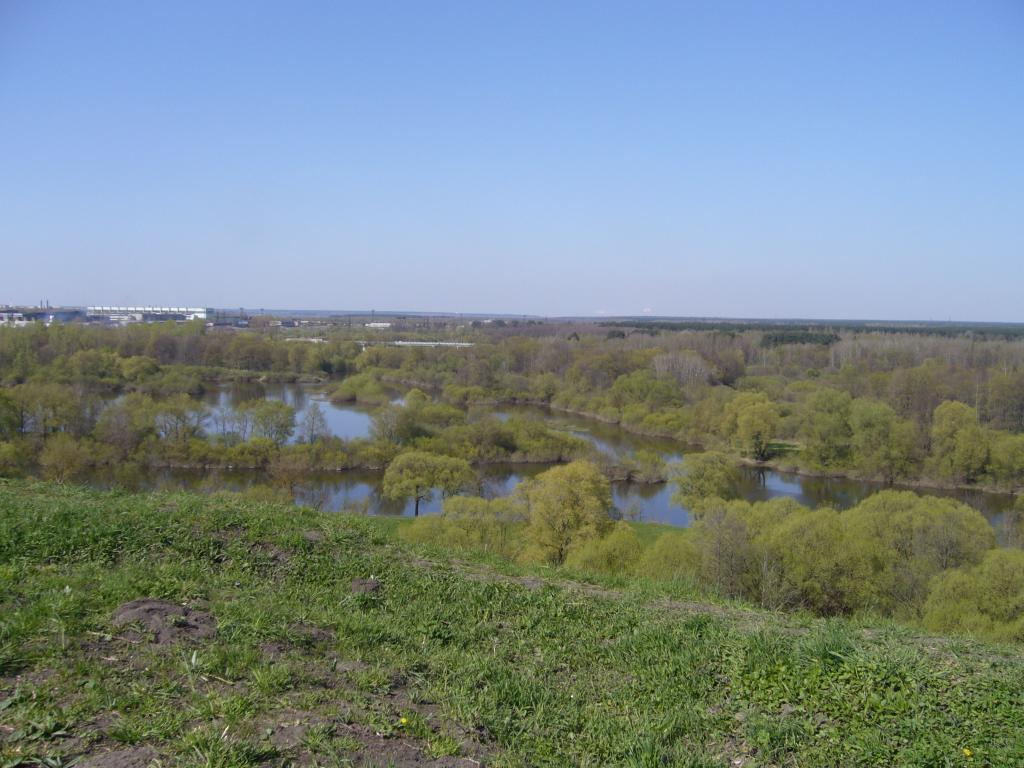

Location
- Country: Russia

Physical characteristics
- Mouth: Desna
  - coordinates: 53.2852°N 34.3354°E
- Length: 213 km (132 mi)
- Basin size: 4,340 km^{2} (1,680 sq mi)

Basin features
- Progression: Desna→ Dnieper→ Dnieper–Bug estuary→ Black Sea

The Bolva (Russian: Болва) is a river in Kaluga and Bryansk Oblasts in Russia. It is a left tributary of the Desna. It is 213 km in length, with a drainage basin of 4340 km^{2}.

The river has its sources on the Smolensk Ridge, and flows in a southerly direction to its confluence with the Desna in the city of Bryansk. The river also flows through the towns of Dyatkovo, Fokino, Kirov and Lyudinovo.

In the 19th century, the river was navigable between Dyatkovo and Bryansk.
