= Vyshkov =

Urban locality in Bryansk Oblast, Russia

Vyshkov Вышков
- Urban-type settlement
- Interactive map of Vyshkov
- Location of Vyshkov Vyshkov (European Russia) Vyshkov (Russia)
- Coordinates: 52°28′46″N 31°41′04″E
- Country: Russia
- Federal subject: Bryansk Oblast
- Administrative district: Zlynkovsky District

Population (2010 Census)
  - Total: 2,700
  - Estimate (2025): 2,446 (−9.4%)
- Time zone: UTC+3 (MSK)
- Postal code: 243620
- OKTMO ID: 15623153051

Vyshkov (Russian: Вы́шков) is an urban-type settlement in Zlynkovsky District of Bryansk Oblast, Russia. Population: 2,497 (2021 census); 2,700 (2010 census); 2,940 (2002 census); 3,566 (1989 Soviet census).

== History ==
Historically, the territory at various times formed part of Lithuania, Muscovy, the Polish–Lithuanian Commonwealth and Russia.

During the German occupation (World War II), the occupiers operated a forced labour battalion for Jews in the settlement.
