= Bytosh =

Urban locality in Bryansk Oblast, Russia

Bytosh Бытошь
- Urban-type settlement
- Interactive map of Bytosh
- Location of Bytosh Bytosh (Bryansk Oblast)
- Coordinates: 53°49′03″N 34°05′27″E
- Country: Russia
- Federal subject: Bryansk Oblast
- Administrative district: Dyatkovsky District

Population (2010 Census)
  - Total: 4,255
  - Estimate (2025): 3,768 (−11.4%)
- Time zone: UTC+3 (MSK)
- Postal code: 242670
- OKTMO ID: 15616153051

Bytosh (Russian: Быто́шь) is an urban-type settlement in Dyatkovsky District of Bryansk Oblast, Russia. Population: 3,990 (2021 census); 4,255 (2010 census); 4,515 (2002 census); 5,341 (1989 Soviet census).
