= Ivot =

Urban locality in Bryansk Oblast, Russia

Ivot Ивот
- Urban-type settlement
- Interactive map of Ivot
- Location of Ivot Ivot (Bryansk Oblast)
- Coordinates: 53°40′49″N 34°11′47″E
- Country: Russia
- Federal subject: Bryansk Oblast
- Administrative district: Dyatkovsky District
- Founded: 1800

Population (2010 Census)
  - Total: 6,374
  - Estimate (2025): 5,592 (−12.3%)
- Time zone: UTC+3 (MSK)
- Postal code: 242650
- OKTMO ID: 15616156051

Ivot (Russian: Иво́т) is an urban-type settlement in Dyatkovsky District of Bryansk Oblast, Russia. Population: 5,844 (2021 census); 6,374 (2010 census); 6,422 (2002 census); 6,972 (1989 Soviet census).
