= Vygonichsky District =

Vygonichsky District Выгоничский район (Russian)
- District
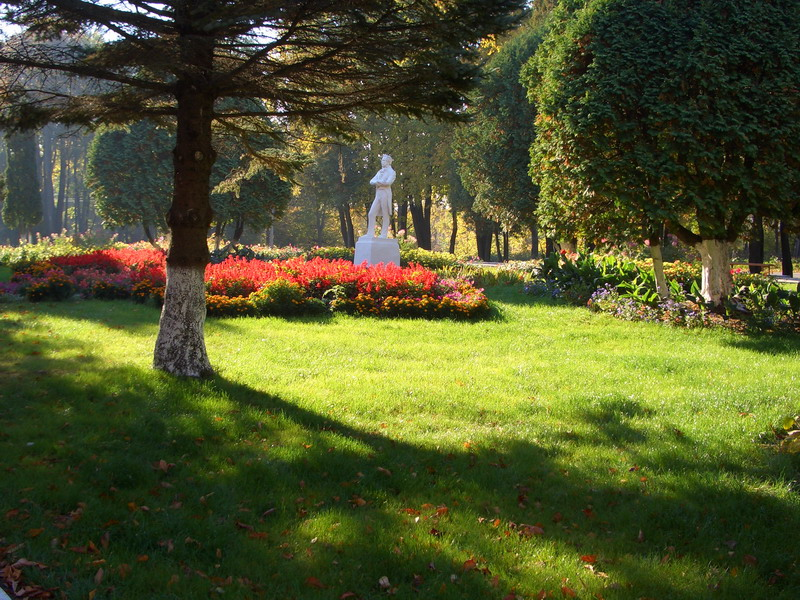
- Park in Kokino

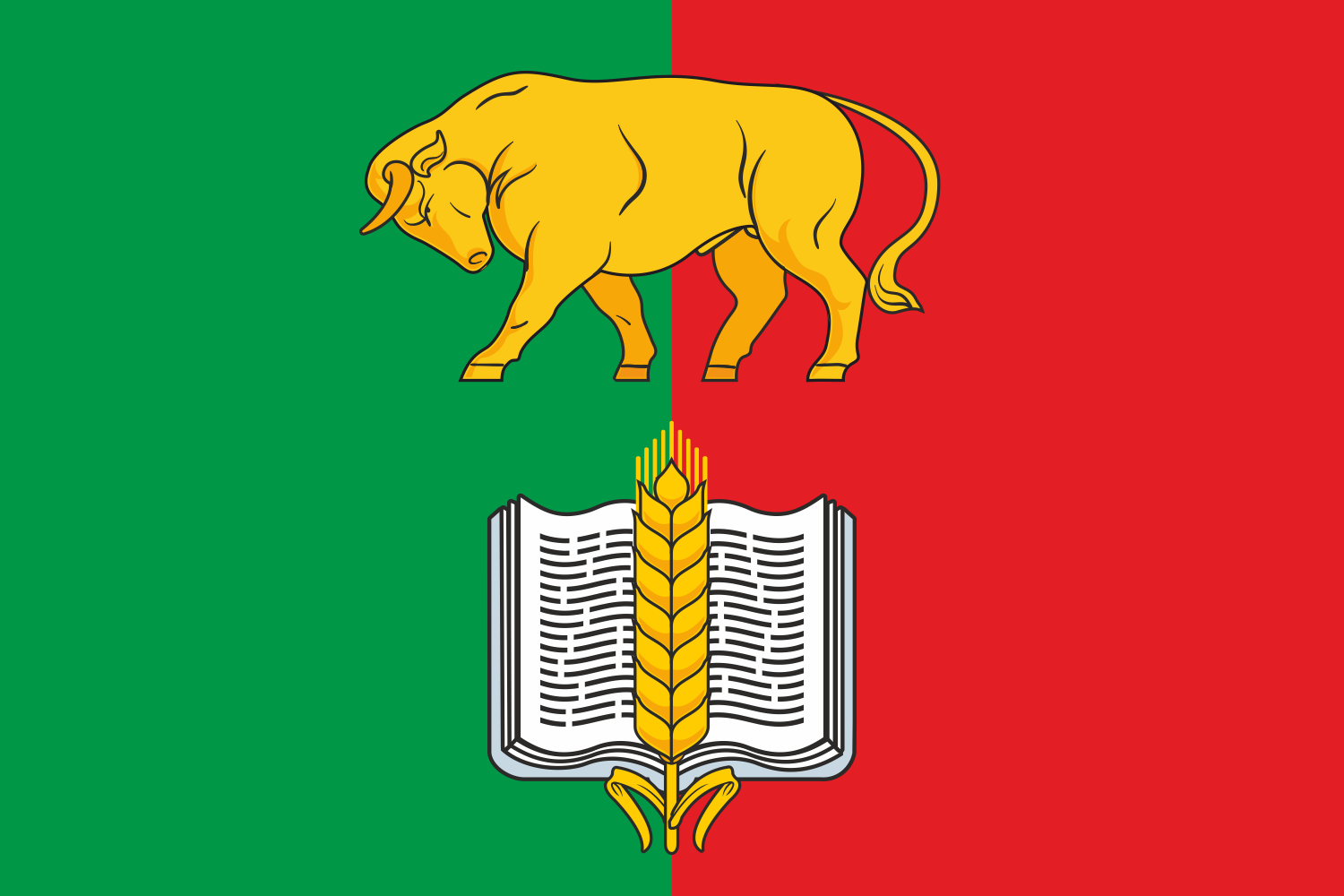
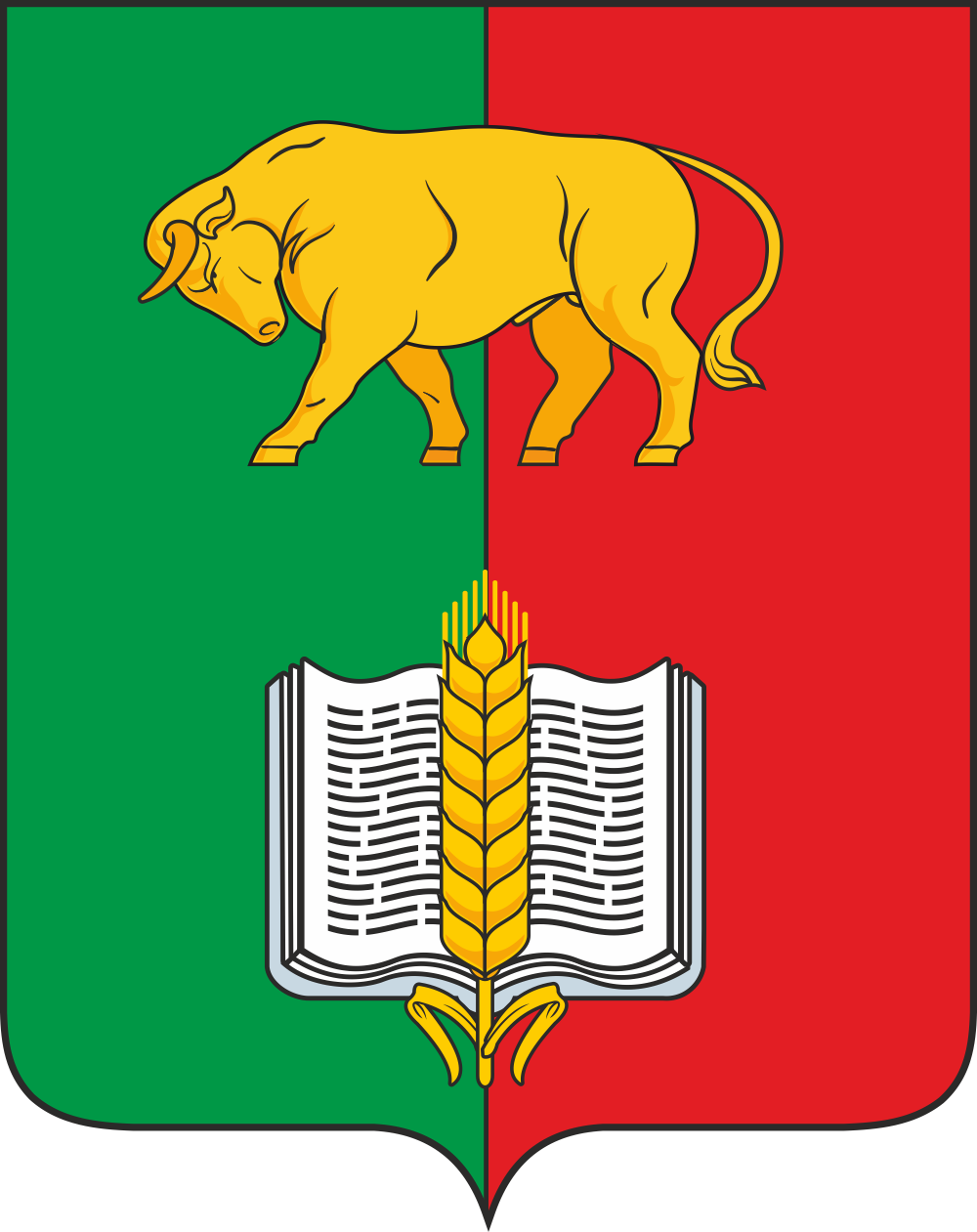
- Flag Coat of arms
- Location of Vygonichsky District in Bryansk Oblast
- Coordinates: 53°05′N 34°04′E
- Country: Russia
- Federal subject: Bryansk Oblast
- Established: 1929
- Administrative center: Vygonichi

Area
  - Total: 1,028 km^{2} (397 sq mi)

Population (2010 Census)
  - Total: 20,105
  - Density: 19.56/km^{2} (50.65/sq mi)
  - Urban: 24.6%
  - Rural: 75.4%

Administrative structure
  - Administrative divisions: 1 Settlement administrative okrugs, 9 Rural administrative okrugs
  - Inhabited localities: 1 urban-type settlements, 82 rural localities

Municipal structure
  - Municipally incorporated as: Vygonichsky Municipal District
  - Municipal divisions: 1 urban settlements, 9 rural settlements
- Time zone: UTC+3 (MSK)
- OKTMO ID: 15610000
- Website: http://www.adminwr.ru/

Vygonichsky District (Russian: Вы́гоничский райо́н) is an administrative and municipal district (raion), one of the 27 in Bryansk Oblast, Russia. It is located in the center of the oblast. The area of the district is 1,028 square kilometers (397 sq mi). Its administrative center is the urban locality (a work settlement) of Vygonichi. Population: 17,117 (2021 census); 20,105 (2010 census); 22,770 (2002 Census); 23,058 (1989 Soviet census). The population of Vygonichi accounts for 27.2% of the district's total population.
