= Fokino, Bryansk Oblast =

Town in Bryansk Oblast, Russia

Fokino Фокино
- Town
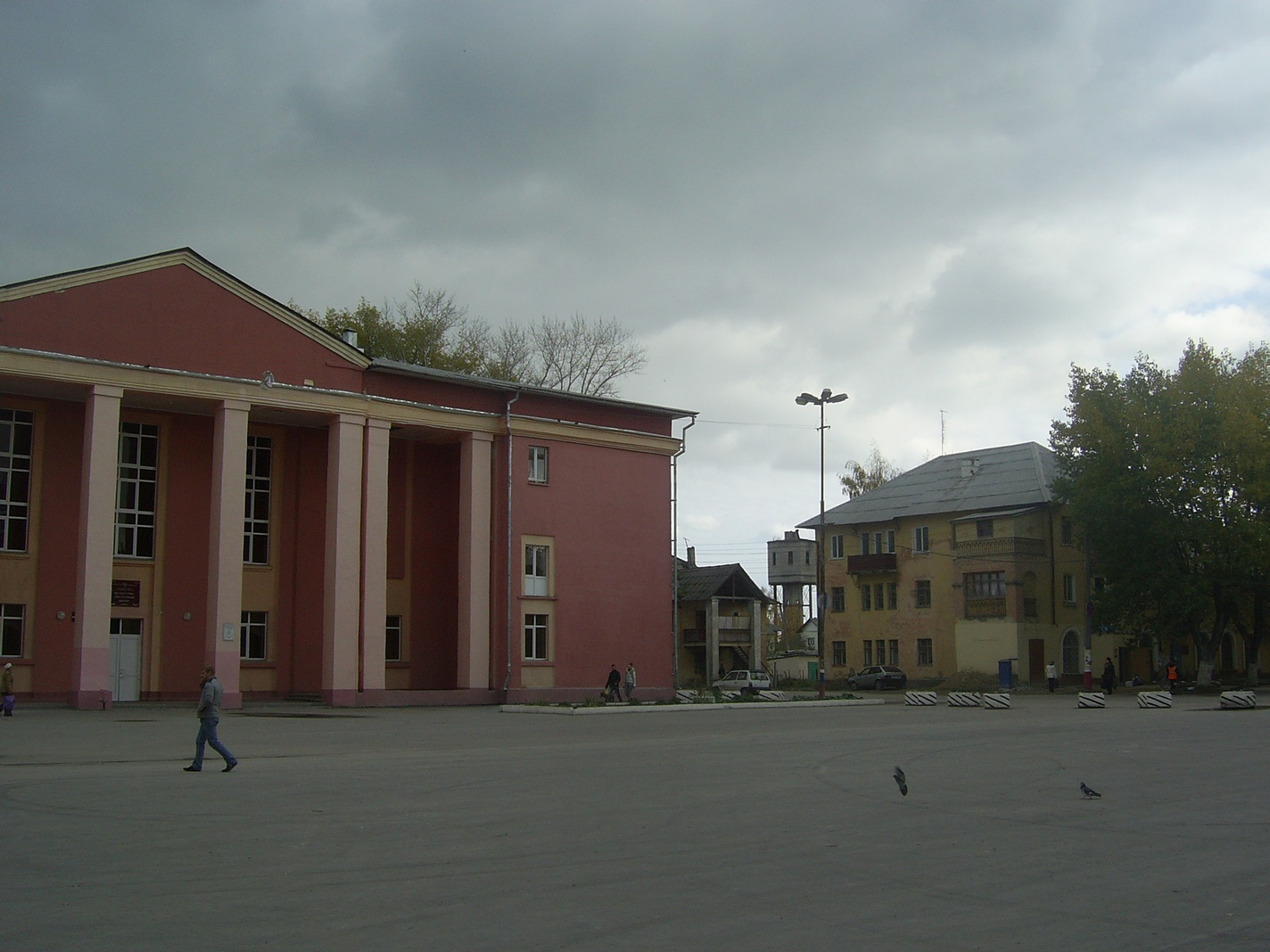
- Central Square of Fokino

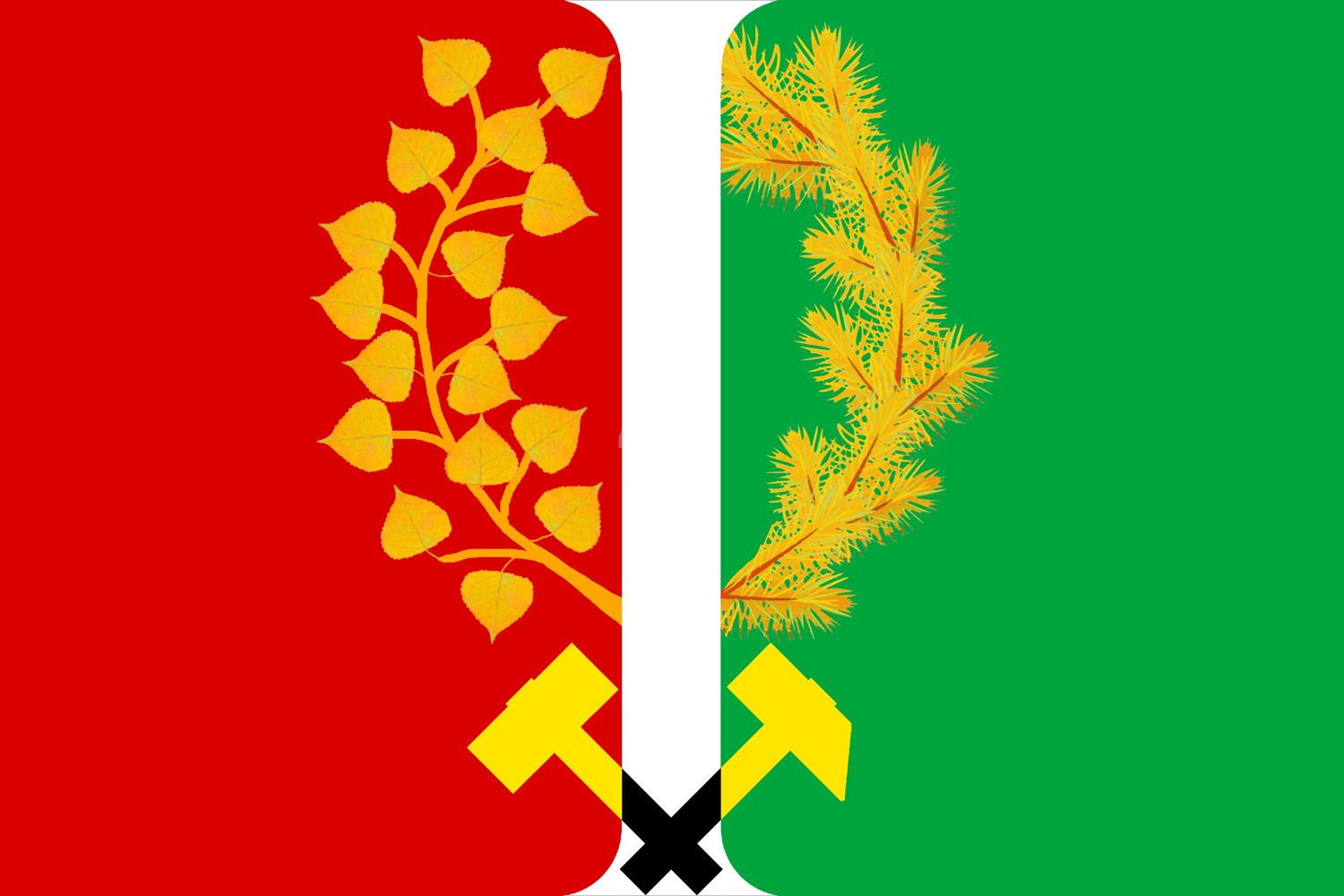
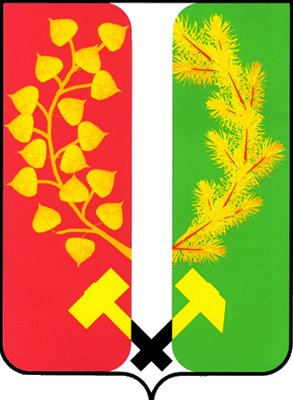
- Flag Coat of arms
- Interactive map of Fokino
- Location of Fokino Fokino (Bryansk Oblast)
- Coordinates: 53°12′46″N 34°25′07″E
- Country: Russia
- Federal subject: Bryansk Oblast
- Founded: 1899
- Town status since: 1954
- Elevation: 190 m (620 ft)

Population (2010 Census)
  - Total: 13,876
  - Estimate (2021): 12,538 (−9.6%)

Administrative status
  - Subordinated to: Fokinsky Urban Administrative Okrug (town of oblast significance)
  - Capital of: Starodubsky Urban Administrative Okrug

Municipal status
  - Urban okrug: Fokino Urban Okrug
  - Capital of: Fokino Urban Okrug
- Time zone: UTC+3 (MSK)
- Postal code: 242610
- Dialing code: +7 48333
- OKTMO ID: 15710000001

Fokino (Russian: Фо́кино) is a town in Bryansk Oblast, Russia, located on the Bolva River (Desna's tributary) 16 kilometers (9.9 mi) north of Bryansk. Population: 12,538 (2021 census); 13,876 (2010 census); 15,504 (2002 census); 15,191 (1989 Soviet census).

== History ==
Town status was granted to it in 1954.

== Administrative and municipal status ==
Within the framework of administrative divisions, Fokino is incorporated as Fokinsky Urban Administrative Okrug—an administrative unit with the status equal to that of the districts. As a municipal division, Fokinsky Urban Administrative Okrug is incorporated as Fokino Urban Okrug.

Prior to January 1, 2013, Fokino was administratively incorporated as a town of district significance within Dyatkovsky District.
