= Vygonichi =

Urban locality in Bryansk Oblast, Russia

Vygonichi Выгоничи
- Urban-type settlement
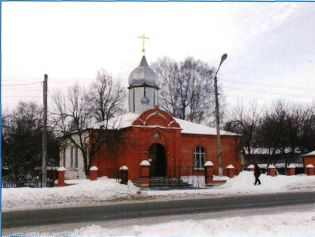

- Flag Coat of arms
- Interactive map of Vygonichi
- Location of Vygonichi Vygonichi (Bryansk Oblast)
- Coordinates: 53°05′56″N 34°04′08″E
- Country: Russia
- Federal subject: Bryansk Oblast
- Administrative district: Vygonichsky District
- Founded: 1887

Population (2010 Census)
  - Total: 4,945
  - Estimate (2025): 4,673 (−5.5%)
- Time zone: UTC+3 (MSK)
- Postal code: 243361
- OKTMO ID: 15610151051

Vygonichi (Russian: Вы́гоничи) is an urban-type settlement and the administrative center of Vygonichsky District, Bryansk Oblast, Russia. Population: 4,658 (2021 census); 4,945 (2010 census); 5,189 (2002 census); 5,111 (1989 Soviet census).
