= Ramasukha =

Urban locality in Bryansk Oblast, Russia

Ramasukha Рамасуха
- Urban-type settlement
- Interactive map of Ramasukha
- Location of Ramasukha Ramasukha (Bryansk Oblast)
- Coordinates: 52°44′24″N 33°32′30″E
- Country: Russia
- Federal subject: Bryansk Oblast
- Administrative district: Pochepsky District

Population (2010 Census)
  - Total: 481
  - Estimate (2025): 330 (−31.4%)
- Time zone: UTC+3 (MSK)
- Postal code: 243413
- OKTMO ID: 15644160051

Ramasukha (Russian: Рамасу́ха) is an urban-type settlement in Pochepsky District of Bryansk Oblast, Russia. Population: 371 (2021 census); 481 (2010 census); 564 (2002 census); 631 (1989 Soviet census).
