= Belaya Beryozka =

Urban locality in Bryansk Oblast, Russia

Belaya Beryozka Белая Берёзка
- Urban-type settlement
- Interactive map of Belaya Beryozka
- Location of Belaya Beryozka Belaya Beryozka (Bryansk Oblast)
- Coordinates: 52°22′50″N 33°28′39″E
- Country: Russia
- Federal subject: Bryansk Oblast
- Administrative district: Trubchevsky District
- Founded: 1915

Population (2010 Census)
  - Total: 6,283
  - Estimate (2025): 5,578 (−11.2%)
- Time zone: UTC+3 (MSK)
- Postal code: 242250
- OKTMO ID: 15656155051

Belaya Beryozka (Russian: Бе́лая Берёзка) is an urban-type settlement in Trubchevsky District of Bryansk Oblast, Russia. It is located on the left bank of the Desna River. Population: 5,886 (2021 census); 6,283 (2010 census); 7,154 (2002 census); 7,778 (1989 Soviet census).
