= Bolshoye Polpino =

Urban locality in Bryansk Oblast, Russia

Bolshoye Polpino Большое Полпино
- Urban-type settlement
- Interactive map of Bolshoye Polpino
- Location of Bolshoye Polpino Bolshoye Polpino (Bryansk Oblast)
- Coordinates: 53°14′40″N 34°30′25″E
- Country: Russia
- Federal subject: Bryansk Oblast

Population (2010 Census)
  - Total: 6,356
  - Estimate (2025): 5,721 (−10%)
- Time zone: UTC+3 (MSK)
- Postal code: 241903
- Dialing code: +7 4832
- OKTMO ID: 15701000061

Bolshoye Polpino (Russian: Большо́е По́лпино) is an urban locality (urban-type settlement) under the administrative jurisdiction of the town of oblast significance of Bryansk of Bryansk Oblast, Russia. Population: 5,859 (2021 census); 6,356 (2010 census); 4,613 (2002 census); 6,374 (1989 Soviet census).
