= Kokorevka =

Urban locality in Bryansk Oblast, Russia

Kokorevka Кокоревка
- Urban-type settlement
- Interactive map of Kokorevka
- Location of Kokorevka Kokorevka (Bryansk Oblast)
- Coordinates: 52°35′18″N 34°16′38″E
- Country: Russia
- Federal subject: Bryansk Oblast
- Administrative district: Suzemsky District

Population (2010 Census)
  - Total: 1,962
  - Estimate (2025): 1,713 (−12.7%)
- Time zone: UTC+3 (MSK)
- Postal code: 242160
- OKTMO ID: 15652162051

Kokorevka (Russian: Ко́коревка) is an urban-type settlement in Suzemsky District of Bryansk Oblast, Russia. Population: 1,768 (2021 census); 1,962 (2010 census); 2,452 (2002 census); 2,802 (1989 Soviet census).
