= Star, Bryansk Oblast =

Star Старь
- Urban-type settlement
- Interactive map of Star
- Location of Star Star (Bryansk Oblast)
- Coordinates: 53°37′25″N 34°09′09″E
- Country: Russia
- Federal subject: Bryansk Oblast
- Administrative district: Dyatkovsky District
- Founded: 1785

Population (2010 Census)
  - Total: 5,003
  - Estimate (2025): 3,927 (−21.5%)
- Time zone: UTC+3 (MSK)
- Postal code: 242640
- OKTMO ID: 15616163051

Star (Russian: Старь) is an urban locality (a work settlement) in Dyatkovsky District of Bryansk Oblast, Russia. Population: 4,182 (2021 census); 5,003 (2010 census); 5,096 (2002 census); 5,663 (1989 Soviet census).

It was established in 1785 and was granted urban-type settlement status in 1927.
