= Raditsa-Krylovka =

Urban locality in Bryansk Oblast, Russia

Raditsa-Krylovka Радица-Крыловка
- Urban-type settlement
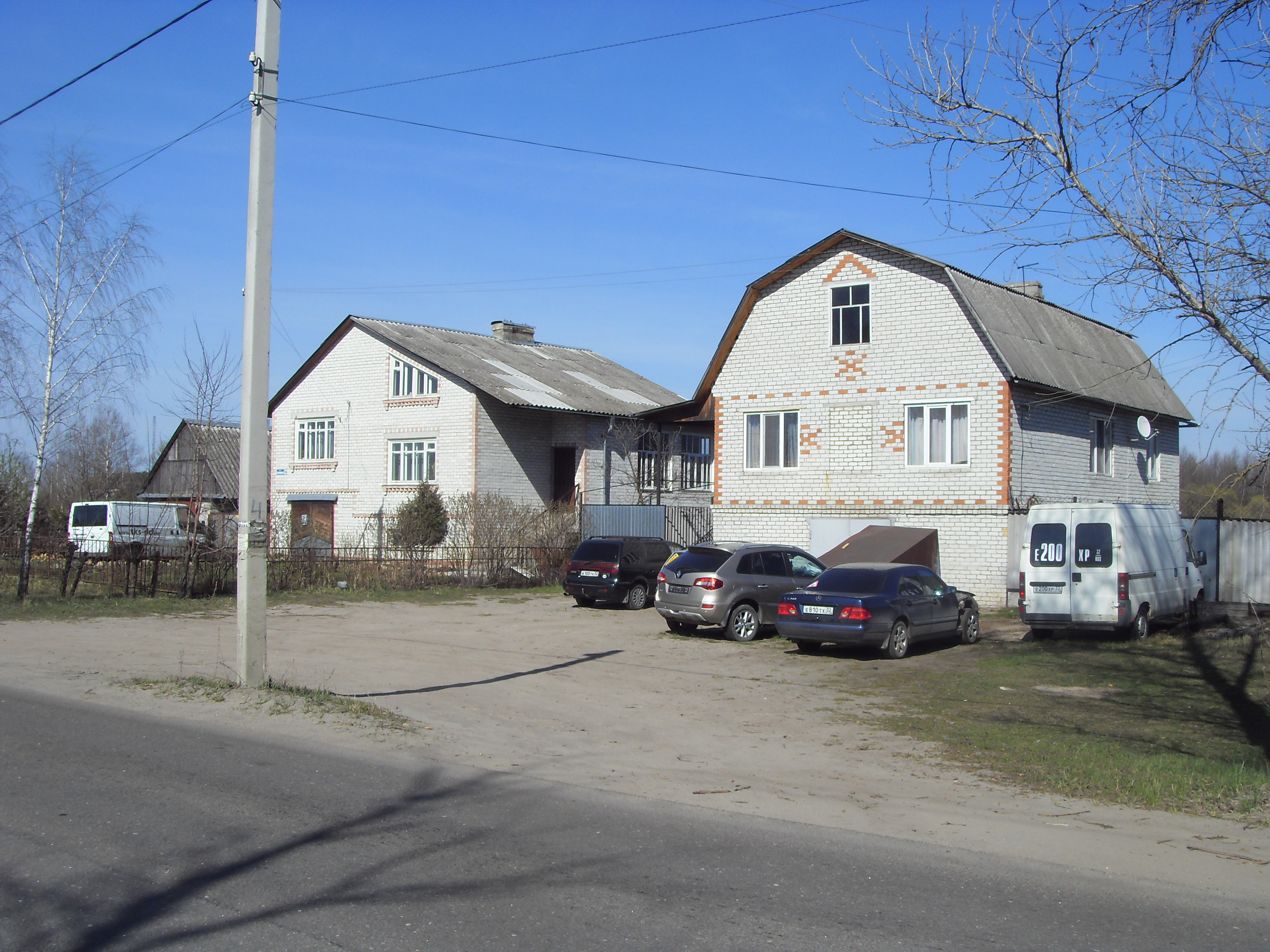
- Interactive map of Raditsa-Krylovka
- Location of Raditsa-Krylovka Raditsa-Krylovka (Bryansk Oblast)
- Coordinates: 53°18′00″N 34°22′05″E
- Country: Russia
- Federal subject: Bryansk Oblast

Population (2010 Census)
  - Total: 3,526
  - Estimate (2025): 3,036 (−13.9%)
- Time zone: UTC+3 (MSK)
- Postal code: 241904
- OKTMO ID: 15701000066

Raditsa-Krylovka (Russian: Ра́дица-Кры́ловка) is an urban locality (urban-type settlement) under the administrative jurisdiction of the town of oblast significance of Bryansk of Bryansk Oblast, Russia. Population: 3,151 (2021 census); 3,526 (2010 census); 3,513 (2002 census); 3,818 (1989 Soviet census).
