= Dyatkovo =

Town in Bryansk Oblast, Russia

Dyatkovo Дятьково
- Town
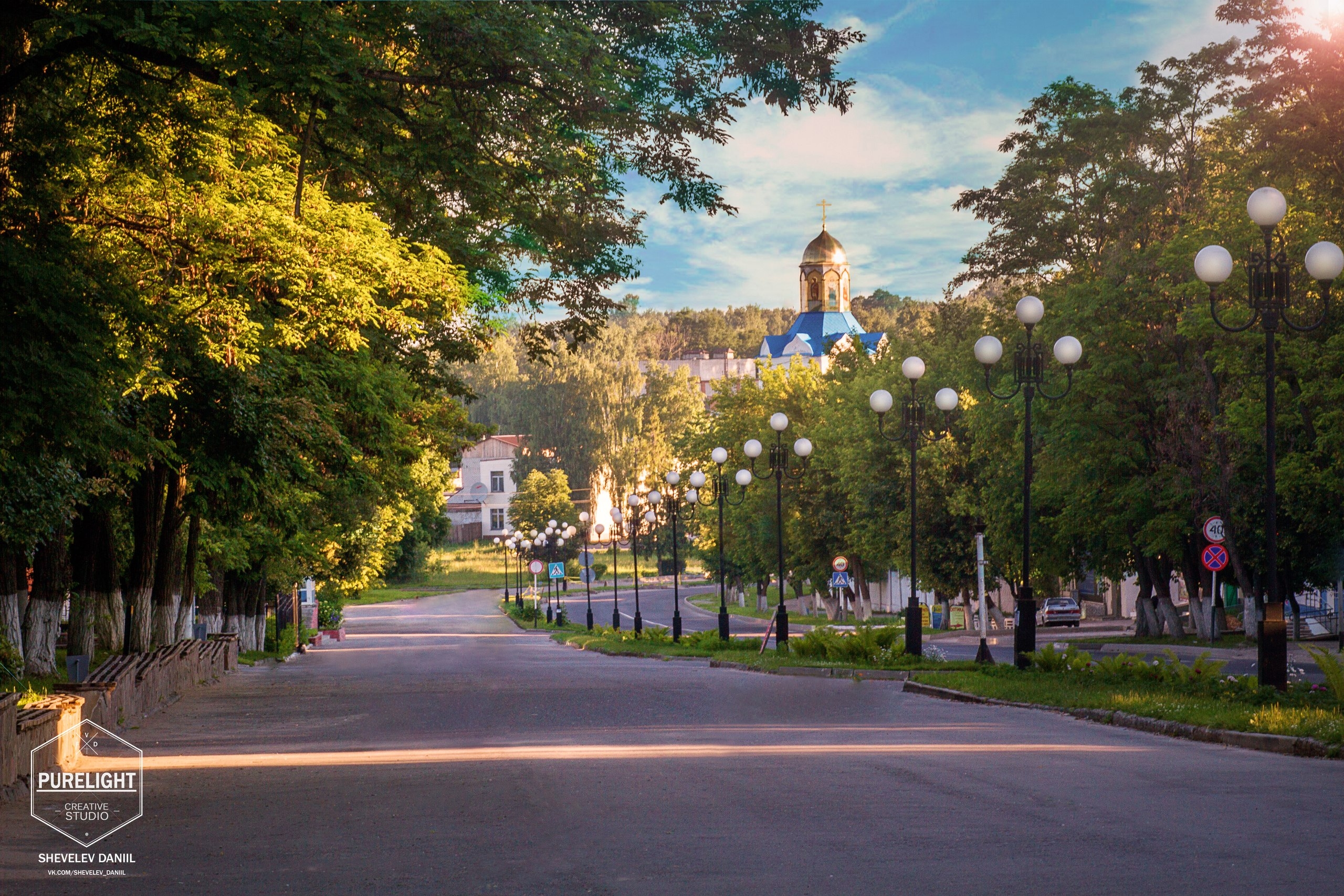
- In Dyatkovo

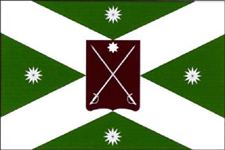
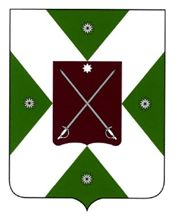
- Flag Coat of arms
- Interactive map of Dyatkovo
- Location of Dyatkovo Dyatkovo (Bryansk Oblast)
- Coordinates: 53°36′N 34°20′E
- Country: Russia
- Federal subject: Bryansk Oblast
- Administrative district: Dyatkovsky District
- Urban Administrative OkrugSelsoviet: Dyatkovsky
- First mentioned: 1626
- Town status since: 1938
- Elevation: 200 m (660 ft)

Population (2010 Census)
  - Total: 29,439
  - Estimate (2021): 25,255 (−14.2%)

Administrative status
  - Capital of: Dyatkovsky District, Dyatkovsky Urban Administrative Okrug

Municipal status
  - Municipal district: Dyatkovsky Municipal District
  - Urban settlement: Dyatkovskoye Urban Settlement
  - Capital of: Dyatkovsky Municipal District, Dyatkovskoye Urban Settlement
- Time zone: UTC+3 (MSK)
- Postal codes: 242600, 242602–242604, 242609, 242633
- Dialing code: +7 48333
- OKTMO ID: 15616104001
- Website: gorod-dyatkovo.ru

Dyatkovo population
- 2010 Census: 29,439
- 2002 Census: 33,600
- 1989 Census: 34,413
- 1979 Census: 31,656

Dyatkovo (Russian: Дя́тьково, [ˈdʲætʲ.kə.və]) is a town and the administrative center of Dyatkovsky District in Bryansk Oblast, Russia. Population: 25,255; (2021 census) 29,439 (2010 census).

== History ==
It was first mentioned in 1626, but it mostly stagnated until 1785, when after the death of Akim Vasilyevich Maltsov, his widow, Marya, bought out a factory from Yevdokiya, the widow of Alexander Vasilyevich Maltsov, and decided to expand its production. In 1790, in a forest near Dyatkovo, Marya Maltsova built the now famous glass and crystal factory, the quality of products of which was comparable to that of the plant in Gus. The workers' settlement around the plant soon grew in size and absorbed the village of Dyatkovo.

In 1798, the ownership of the company passed to Ivan Akimovich Maltsov, who created an entire industrial empire centered in Dyatkovo. In 1853, his business was continued by his son Sergey. By then, 100,000 people were employed by Maltsov's factories, which had their own currency, police force, and a 202-verst (215 km; 134 mi) long railway.

In 1918, when all of the Maltsov's factories were nationalized, the "State Maltsov Factory District" trust centered in Dyatkovo was established. In 1929, Dyatkovsky District produced about 10% of all the window glass produced in the Soviet Union.

Town status was granted to Dyatkovo in 1938.

Bryansk Oblast was a center of partisan movement during World War II. The German Army occupied Dyatkovo on October 9, 1941. In February 1942, Soviet partisans managed to retake power in Dyatkovo and neighboring villages. The area was deeply inside Nazi-occupied territory. The partisans ran a hospital and various shops but were overrun by the Nazis in June 1942. The Red Army retook Dyatkovo on September 15, 1943.

== Administrative and municipal status ==
Within the framework of administrative divisions, Dyatkovo serves as the administrative center of Dyatkovsky District. As an administrative division, it is, together with five rural localities, incorporated within Dyatkovsky District as Dyatkovsky Urban Administrative Okrug. As a municipal division, Dyatkovsky Urban Administrative Okrug is incorporated within Dyatkovsky Municipal District as Dyatkovskoye Urban Settlement.

== Economy and culture ==
Dyatkovo is most noted for its lead crystal factory, furniture factory, and the Lead Crystal Museum, the largest museum of artistic glass in the country.

== Religion ==
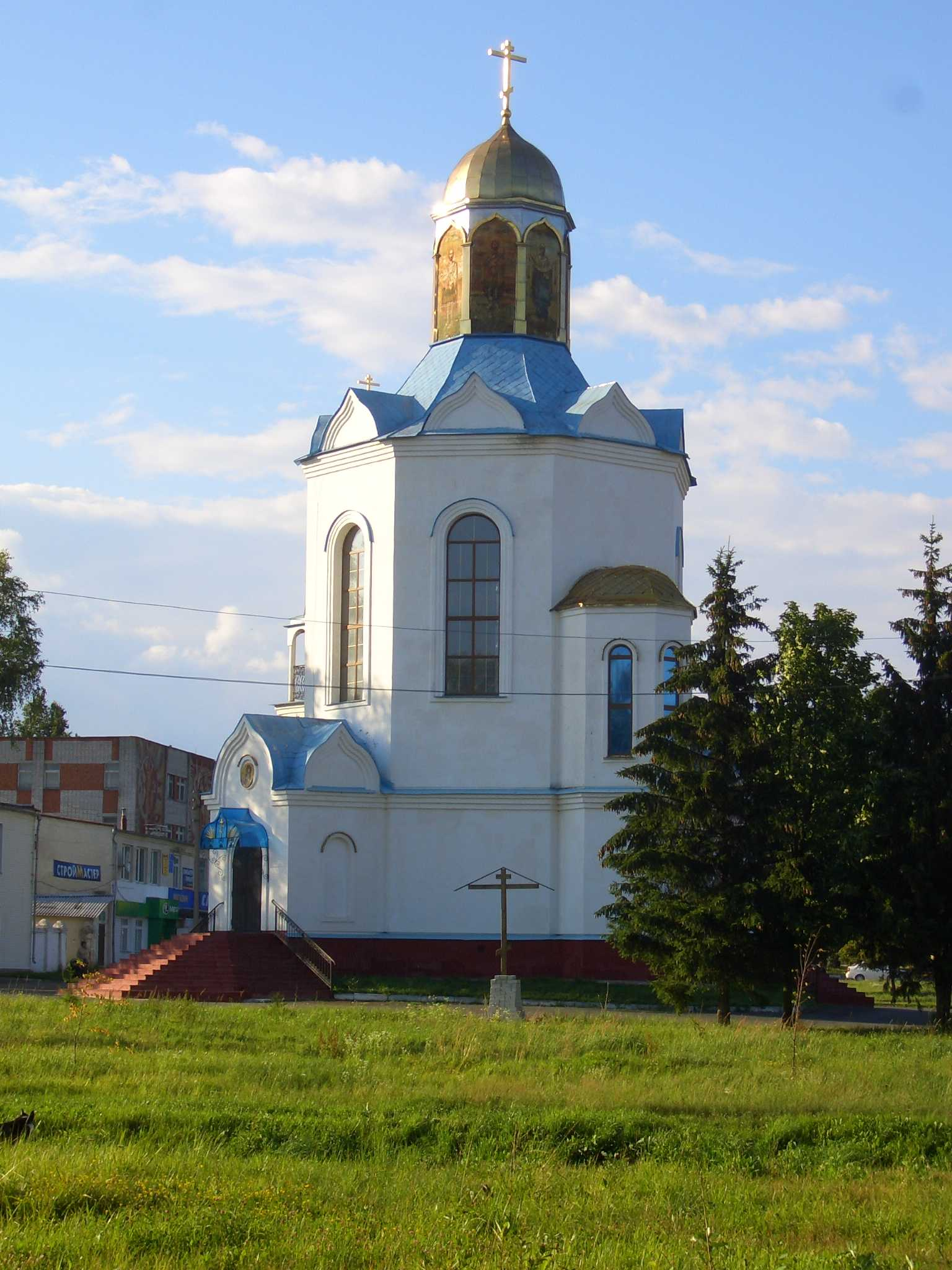
Church Neopalimaya Kupina in Dyatkovo

The Dyatkovo Transfiguration Church was opened in 1810. Its paintings were done in the Italian style and the iconostasis was made of crystal, as was the church's enormous chandelier. After the demolition of the church in 1929, the crystal iconostasis was lost. In 2003, new Dyatkovo church was built in honor of the icon Neopalimaya Kupina (Неопалимая купина, "Burning Bush"). The church possesses the world's only crystal iconostasis, which was made by the Dyatkovo Crystal Factory and which weighs about three tons.

== Popular culture ==
- Episode 11 of season 5 of The Americans was titled "Dyatkovo", with a plot thread involving fictional Nazi war crimes in Dyatkovo.
