= Krasnogorsky District, Bryansk Oblast =

Krasnogorsky District Красногорский район (Russian)
- District
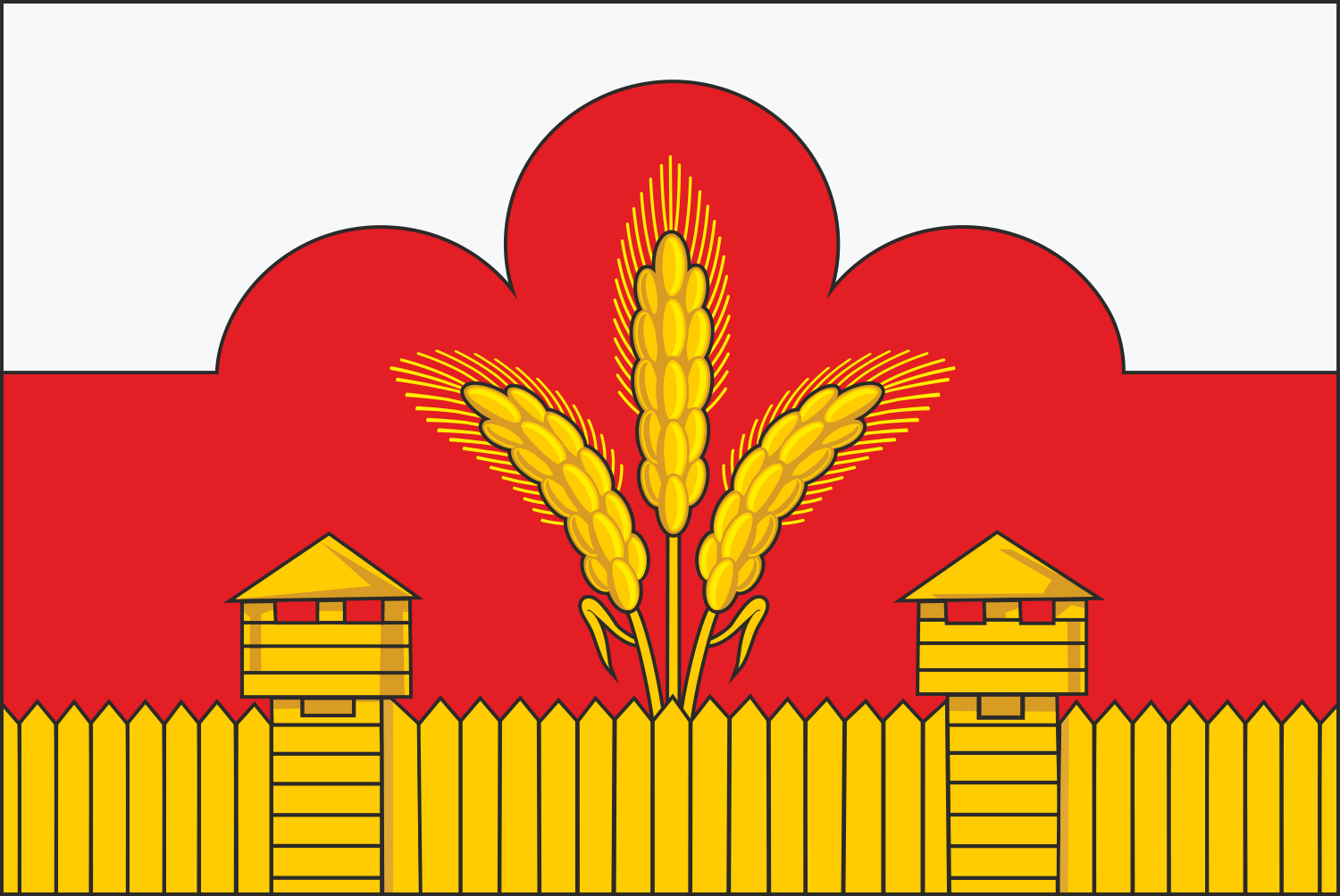
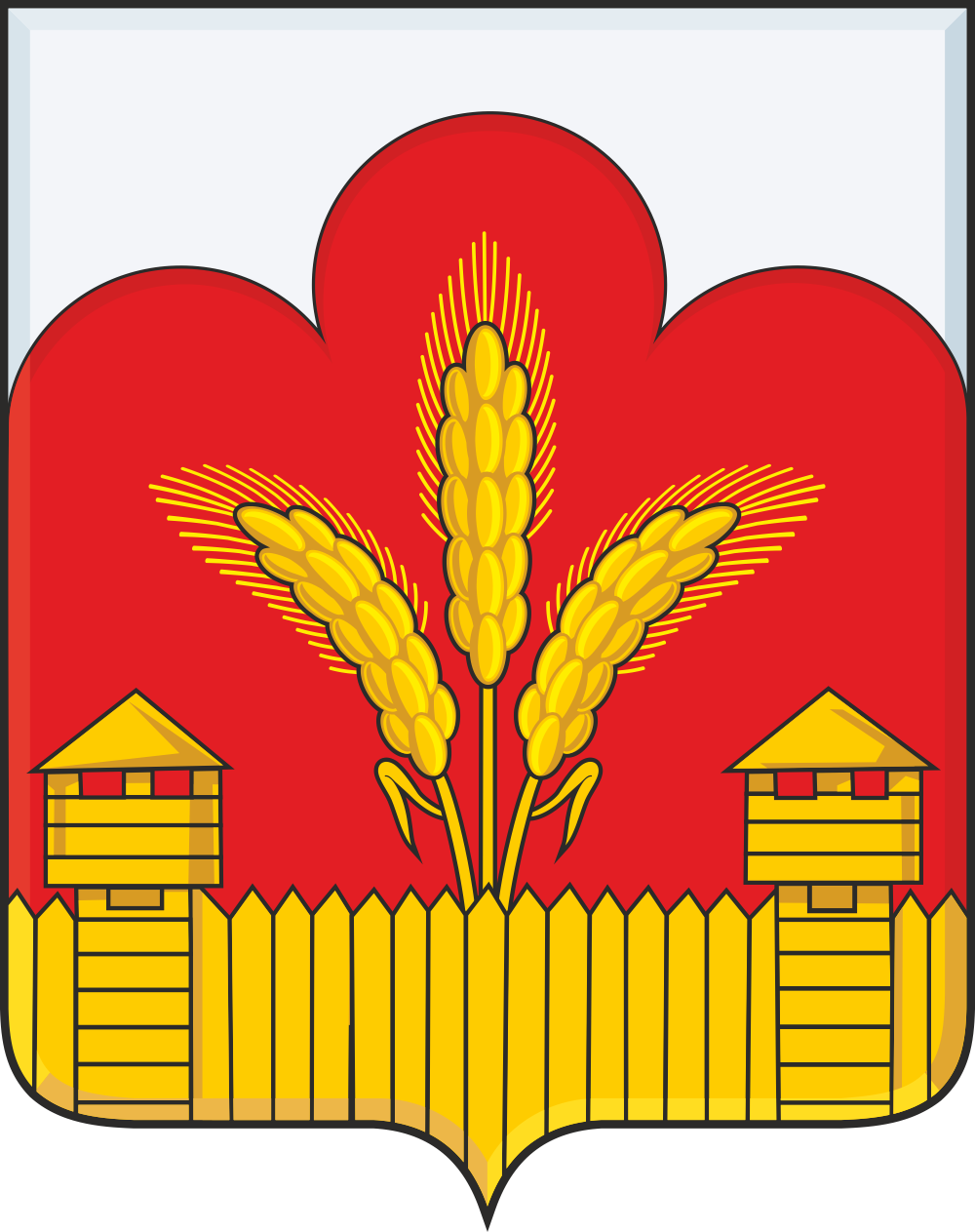
- Flag Coat of arms
- Location of Krasnogorsky District in Bryansk Oblast
- Coordinates: 52°59′57″N 31°35′37″E
- Country: Russia
- Federal subject: Bryansk Oblast
- Administrative center: Krasnaya Gora

Area
  - Total: 1,081 km^{2} (417 sq mi)

Population (2010 Census)
  - Total: 13,208
  - Density: 12.22/km^{2} (31.65/sq mi)
  - Urban: 44.7%
  - Rural: 55.3%

Administrative structure
  - Administrative divisions: 1 Settlement administrative okrugs, 6 Rural administrative okrugs
  - Inhabited localities: 1 urban-type settlements, 59 rural localities

Municipal structure
  - Municipally incorporated as: Krasnogorsky Municipal District
  - Municipal divisions: 1 urban settlements, 6 rural settlements
- Time zone: UTC+3 (MSK)
- OKTMO ID: 15634000
- Website: http://www.krgadm.ru/index.php

Krasnogorsky District (Russian: Красного́рский райо́н) is an administrative and municipal district (raion), one of the twenty-seven in Bryansk Oblast, Russia. It is located in the west of the oblast. The area of the district is 1,081 square kilometers (417 sq mi). Its administrative center is the urban locality (a work settlement) of Krasnaya Gora. Population: 10,250 (2021 census); 13,208 (2010 census); 16,863 (2002 Census); 2,326 (1989 Soviet census). The population of Krasnaya Gora accounts for 53.7% of the district's total population.

== Ecological problems ==
As a result of the Chernobyl disaster on April 26, 1986, part of the territory of Bryansk Oblast has been contaminated with radionuclides (mainly Gordeyevsky, Klimovsky, Klintsovsky, Krasnogorsky, Surazhsky, and Novozybkovsky Districts). In 1999, some 226,000 people lived in areas with the contamination level above 5 Curie/km^{2}, representing approximately 16% of the oblast's population.
