= Dyatkovsky District =

Dyatkovsky District Дятьковский район (Russian)
- District
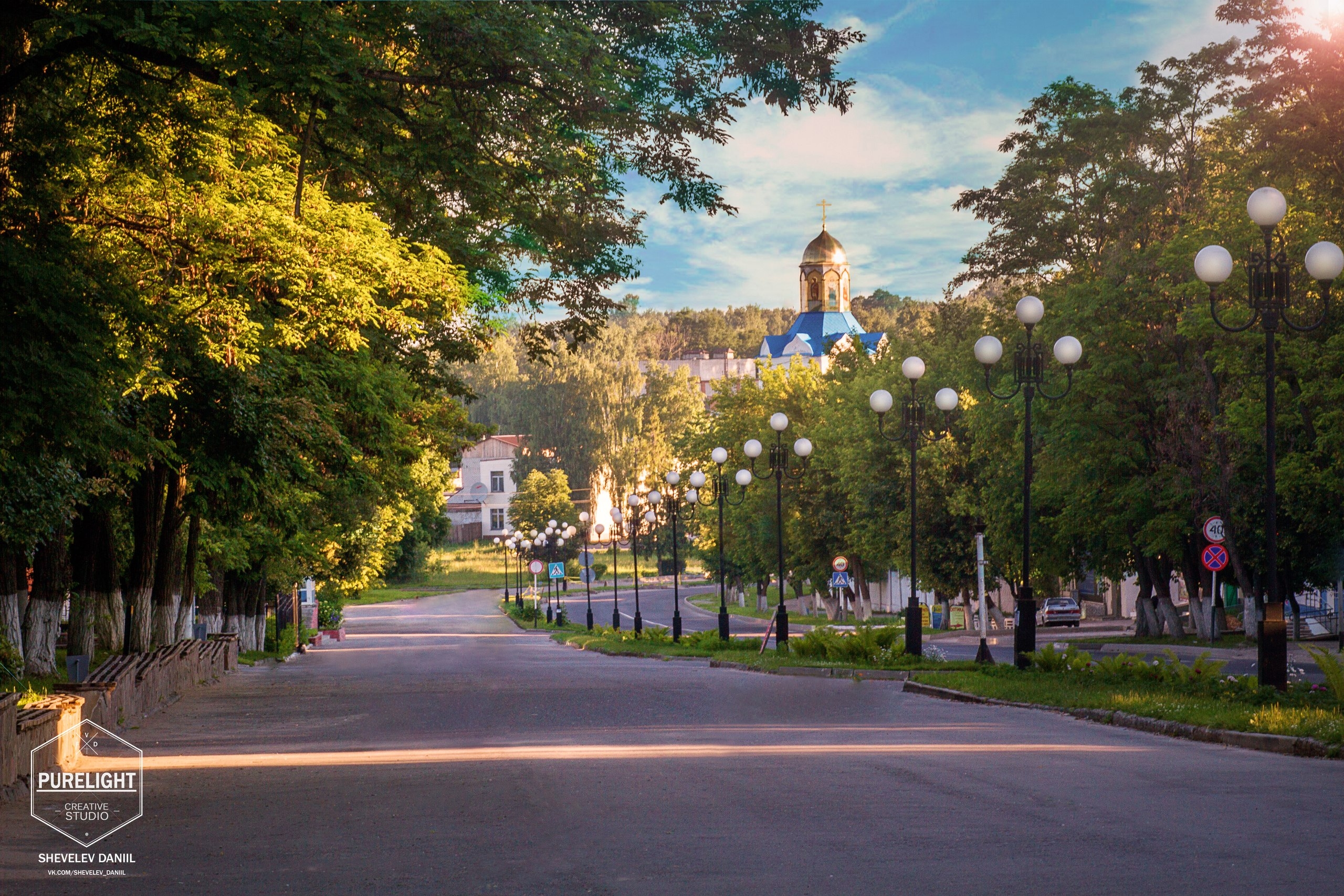
- Dyatkovo

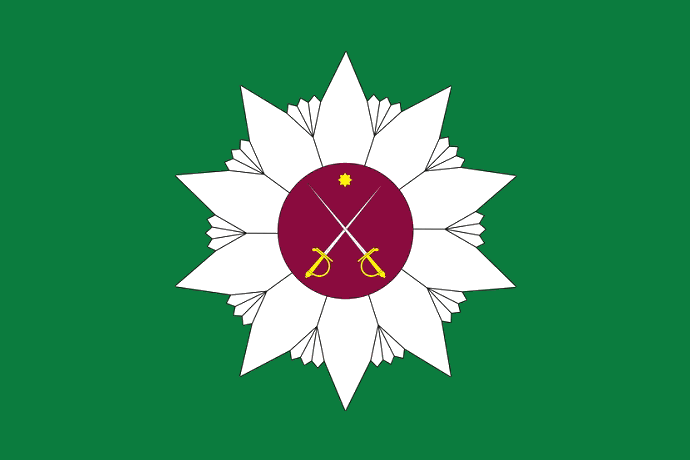
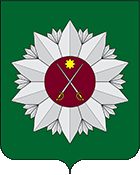
- Flag Coat of arms
- Location of Dyatkovsky District in Bryansk Oblast
- Coordinates: 53°36′N 34°20′E
- Country: Russia
- Federal subject: Bryansk Oblast
- Administrative center: Dyatkovo

Area
  - Total: 1,413 km^{2} (546 sq mi)

Population (2010 Census)
  - Total: 73,935
  - Density: 52.32/km^{2} (135.5/sq mi)
  - Urban: 87.1%
  - Rural: 12.9%

Administrative structure
  - Administrative divisions: 1 Urban administrative okrugs, 4 Settlement administrative okrugs, 5 Rural administrative okrugs
  - Inhabited localities: 1 cities/towns, 4 urban-type settlements, 40 rural localities

Municipal structure
  - Municipally incorporated as: Dyatkovsky Municipal District
  - Municipal divisions: 5 urban settlements, 5 rural settlements
- Time zone: UTC+3 (MSK)
- OKTMO ID: 15616000
- Website: http://dyatkovo.bryansktel.ru/

Dyatkovsky District (Russian: Дя́тьковский райо́н) is an administrative and municipal district (raion), one of the twenty-seven in Bryansk Oblast, Russia. It is located in the north of the oblast. The area of the district is 1,413 square kilometers (546 sq mi). Its administrative center is the town of Dyatkovo. Population: 55,032 (2021 census); 73,935 (2010 census); 45,773 (2002 Census); 48,606 (1989 Soviet census). The population of Dyatkovo accounts for 45.9% of the district's total population.

== Administrative and municipal divisions ==
As an administrative division, the district is divided into five rural administrative okrugs, four settlement administrative okrugs, and one urban administrative okrug (Dyatkovsky). Within the framework of municipal divisions, the rural administrative okrugs are incorporated into five rural settlements, while the settlement administrative okrugs and the urban administrative okrug are incorporated into five urban settlements.

Until January 2013, Fokino was incorporated as a town of district significance within Dyatkovsky District and, within the framework of municipal formations, it was incorporated separately from the district as Fokino Urban Okrug. After January 2013, it is both administratively and municipally separate from the district.
