= Novozybkovsky District =

Novozybkovsky District Новозыбковский район (Russian)
- District
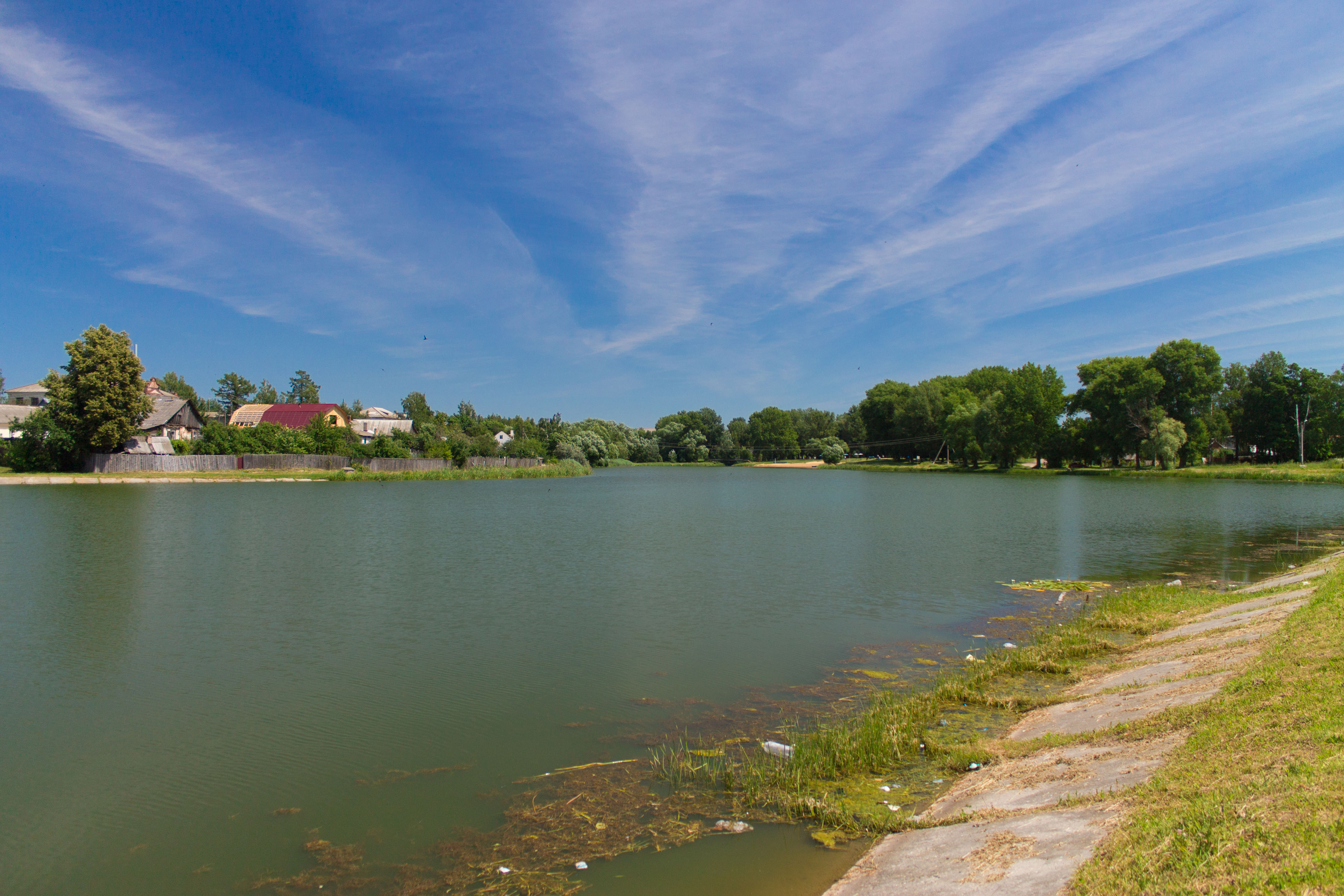
- Karna Lake, Novozybkovsky District

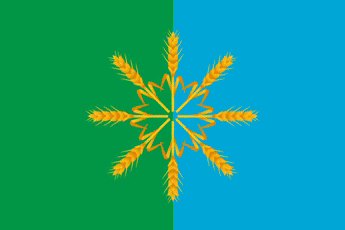
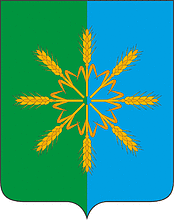
- Flag Coat of arms
- Location of Novozybkovsky District in Bryansk Oblast
- Coordinates: 52°32′N 31°56′E
- Country: Russia
- Federal subject: Bryansk Oblast
- Established: 1929
- Administrative center: Novozybkov

Area
  - Total: 990 km^{2} (380 sq mi)

Population (2010 Census)
  - Total: 12,415
  - Density: 13/km^{2} (32/sq mi)
  - Urban: 0%
  - Rural: 100%

Administrative structure
  - Administrative divisions: 8 Rural administrative okrugs
  - Inhabited localities: 57 rural localities

Municipal structure
  - Municipally incorporated as: Novozybkovsky Municipal District
  - Municipal divisions: 0 urban settlements, 8 rural settlements
- Website: http://www.adminnovzraion.ru/

Novozybkovsky District (Russian: Новозы́бковский райо́н) is an administrative and municipal district (raion), one of the twenty-seven in Bryansk Oblast, Russia. It is located in the west of the oblast and bordered by Gordeyevsky and Krasnogorsky District in the north, Klintsovsky in the east, Zlynkovsky and Klimovsky in the south, and Homel region of Belarus in the west. The area of the district is 990 square kilometers (380 sq mi). Its administrative center is the town of Novozybkov (which is not administratively a part of the district). Population: 12,415 (2010 census); 14,170 (2002 Census); 18,424 (1989 Soviet census).

== Ecological problems ==
As a result of the Chernobyl disaster on April 26, 1986, part of the territory of Bryansk Oblast has been contaminated with radionuclides (mainly Gordeyevsky, Klimovsky, Klintsovsky, Krasnogorsky, Surazhsky, and Novozybkovsky Districts). In 1999, some 226,000 people lived in areas with the contamination level above 5 Curie/km^{2}, representing approximately 16% of the oblast's population.

== Administrative and municipal status ==
Within the framework of administrative divisions, Novozybkovsky District is one of the twenty-seven in the oblast. The town of Novozybkov serves as its administrative center, despite being incorporated separately as an urban administrative okrug—an administrative unit with the status equal to that of the districts.

As a municipal division, the district is incorporated as Novozybkovsky Municipal District. Novozybkov Urban Administrative Okrug is incorporated separately from the district as Novozybkov Urban Okrug.

== Notable residents ==
- Nikolay Goloded (1894, Staryy Krivets village – 1937), Belarusian Bolshevik revolutionary and Soviet bureaucrat
