= Klintsovsky District =

Klintsovsky District Клинцовский район (Russian)
- District
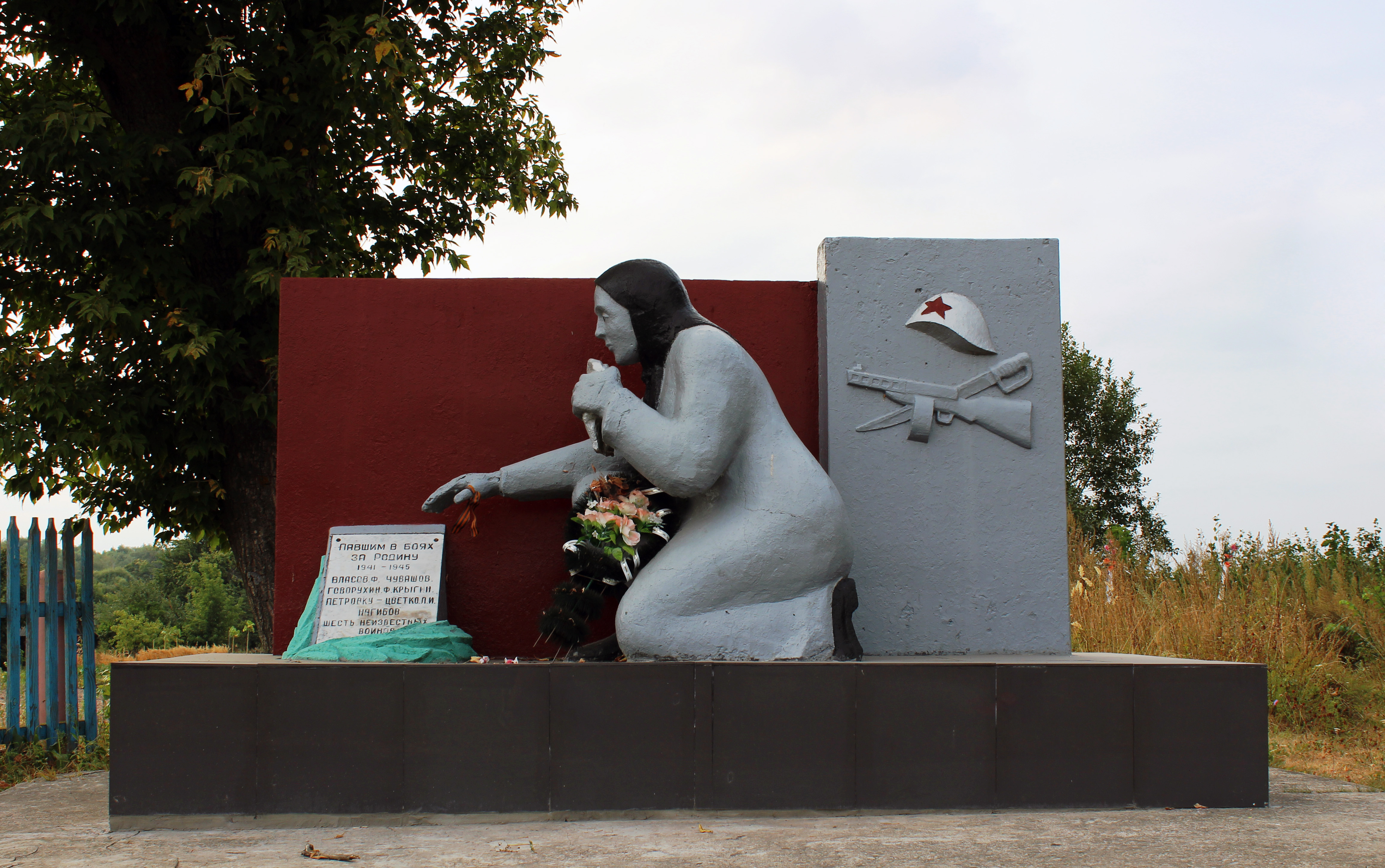
- Mass grave of Soviet soldiers, Small Topalov

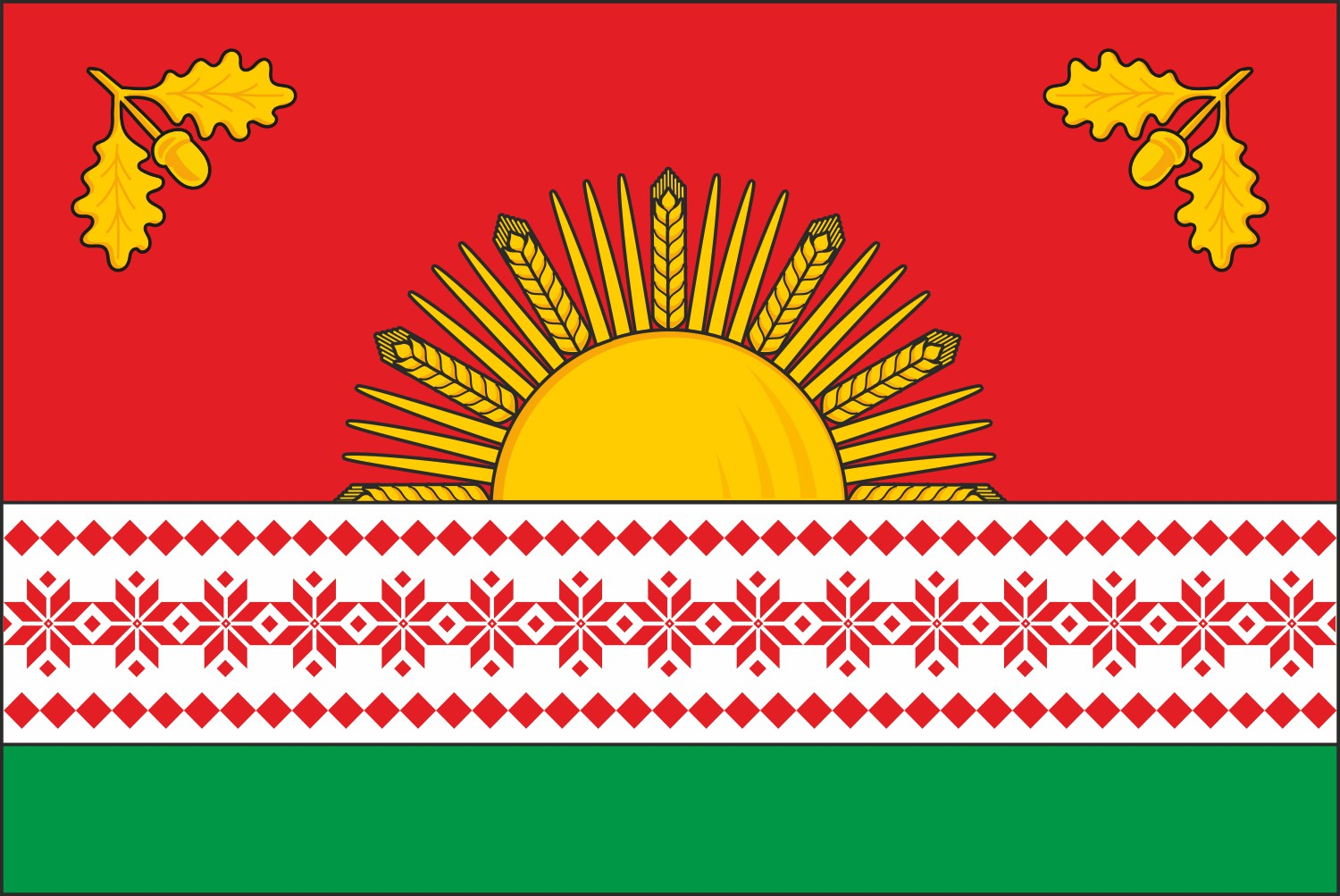
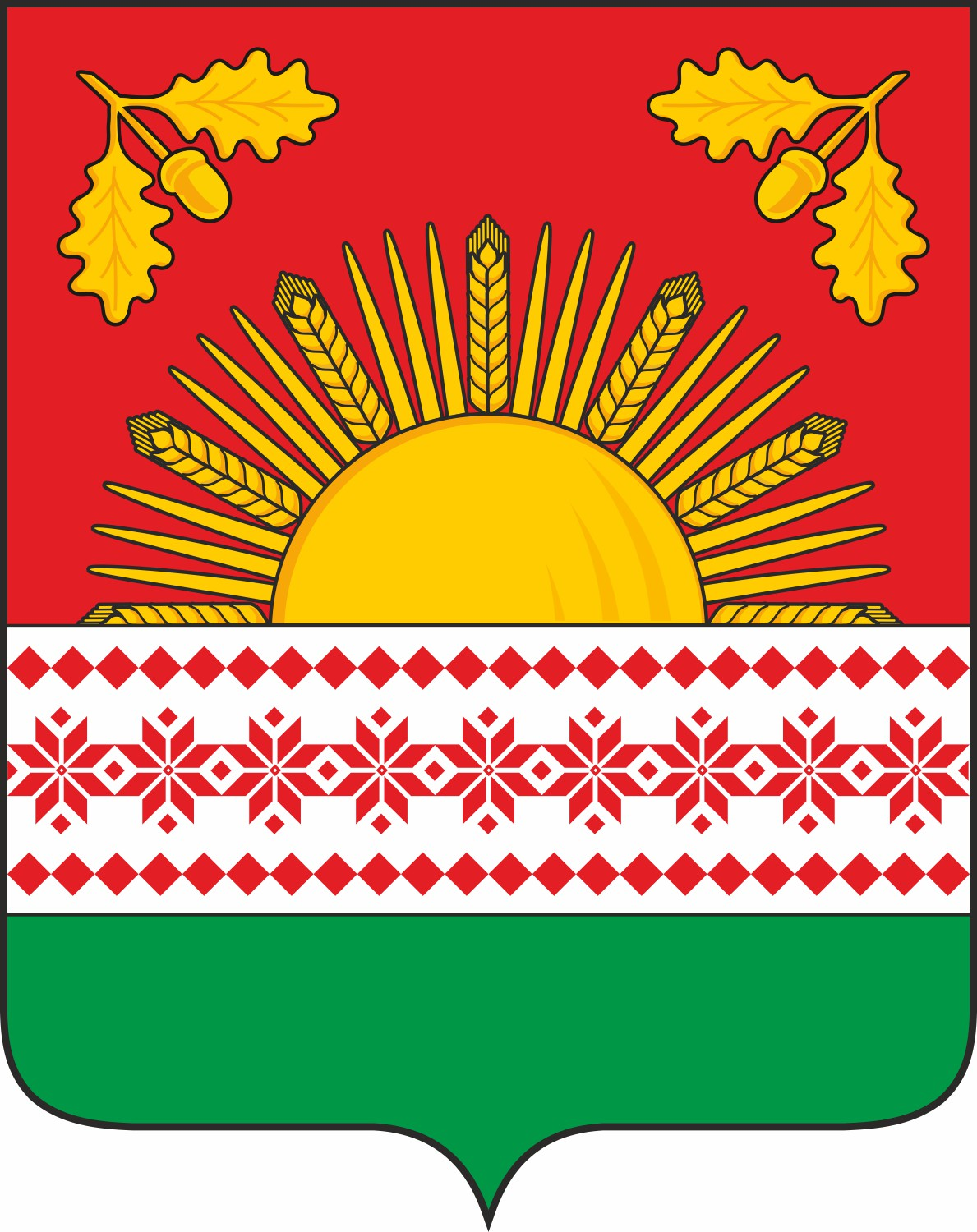
- Flag Coat of arms
- Location of Klintsovsky District in Bryansk Oblast
- Coordinates: 52°45′N 32°14′E
- Country: Russia
- Federal subject: Bryansk Oblast
- Administrative center: Klintsy

Area
  - Total: 1,291.4 km^{2} (498.6 sq mi)

Population (2010 Census)
  - Total: 20,503
  - Density: 15.877/km^{2} (41.120/sq mi)
  - Urban: 0%
  - Rural: 100%

Administrative structure
  - Administrative divisions: 9 Rural administrative okrugs
  - Inhabited localities: 115 rural localities

Municipal structure
  - Municipally incorporated as: Klintsovsky Municipal District
  - Municipal divisions: 0 urban settlements, 9 rural settlements
- Time zone: UTC+3 (MSK)
- OKTMO ID: 15630000
- Website: http://www.klinrai.ru/

Klintsovsky District (Russian: Клинцо́вский райо́н) is an administrative and municipal district (raion), one of the twenty-seven in Bryansk Oblast, Russia. It is located in the west of the oblast. The area of the district is 1,291.4 square kilometers (498.6 sq mi). Its administrative center is the town of Klintsy (which is not administratively a part of the district). Population: 17,163 (2021 census); 20,503 (2010 census); 23,581 (2002 Census); 29,638 (1989 Soviet census).

== Ecological problems ==
As a result of the Chernobyl disaster on April 26, 1986, part of the territory of Bryansk Oblast has been contaminated with radionuclides (mainly Gordeyevsky, Klimovsky, Klintsovsky, Krasnogorsky, Surazhsky, and Novozybkovsky Districts). In 1999, some 226,000 people lived in areas with the contamination level above 5 Curie/km^{2}, representing approximately 16% of the oblast's population.

== Administrative and municipal status ==
Within the framework of administrative divisions, Klintsovsky District is one of the twenty-seven in the oblast. The town of Klintsy serves as its administrative center, despite being incorporated separately as an urban administrative okrug—an administrative unit with the status equal to that of the districts.

As a municipal division, the district is incorporated as Klintsovsky Municipal District. Klintsy Urban Administrative Okrug is incorporated separately from the district as Klintsy Urban Okrug.
