= Surazhsky District =

Surazhsky District Суражский район (Russian)
- District
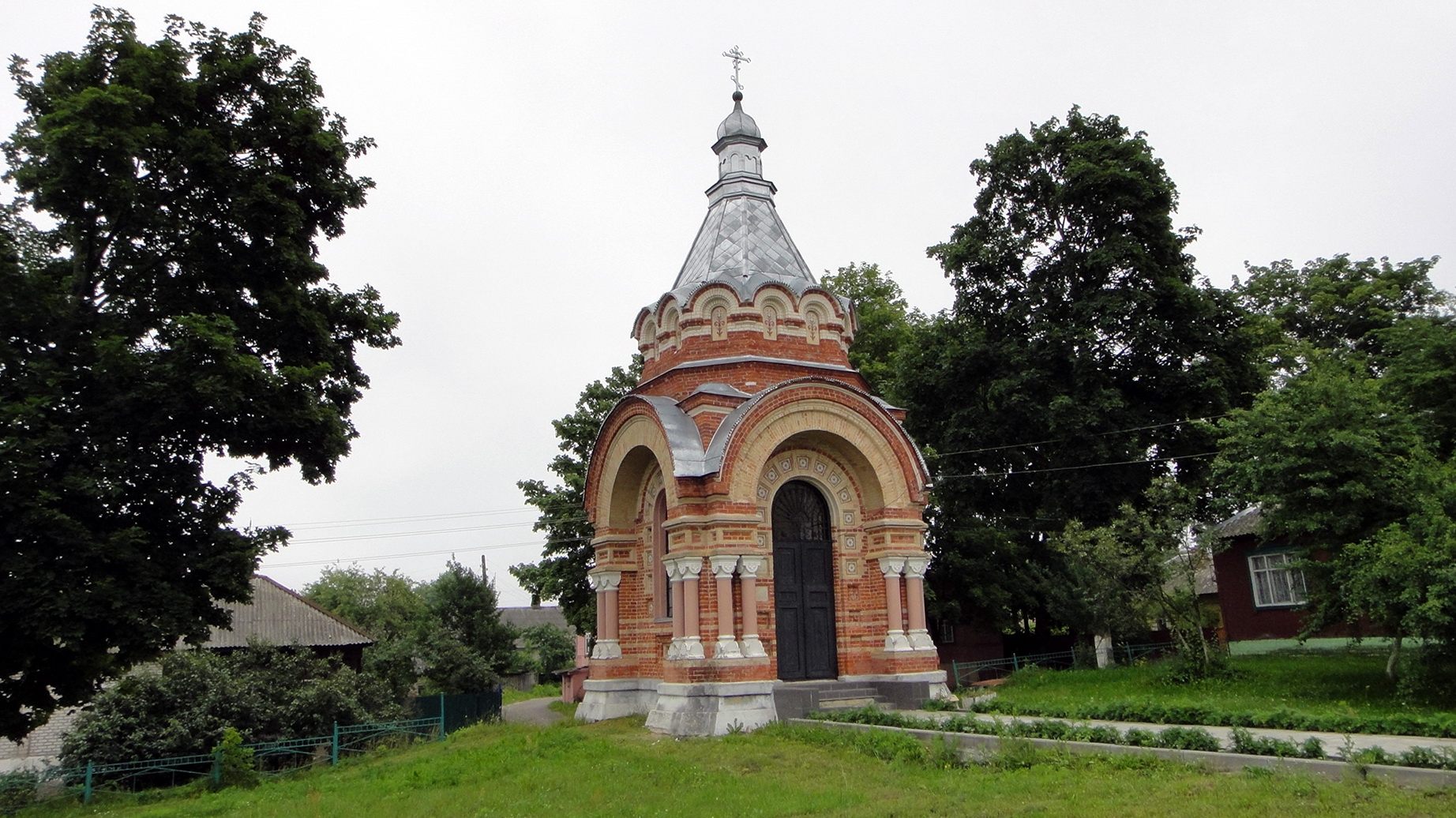
- Chapel-tomb in Surazh

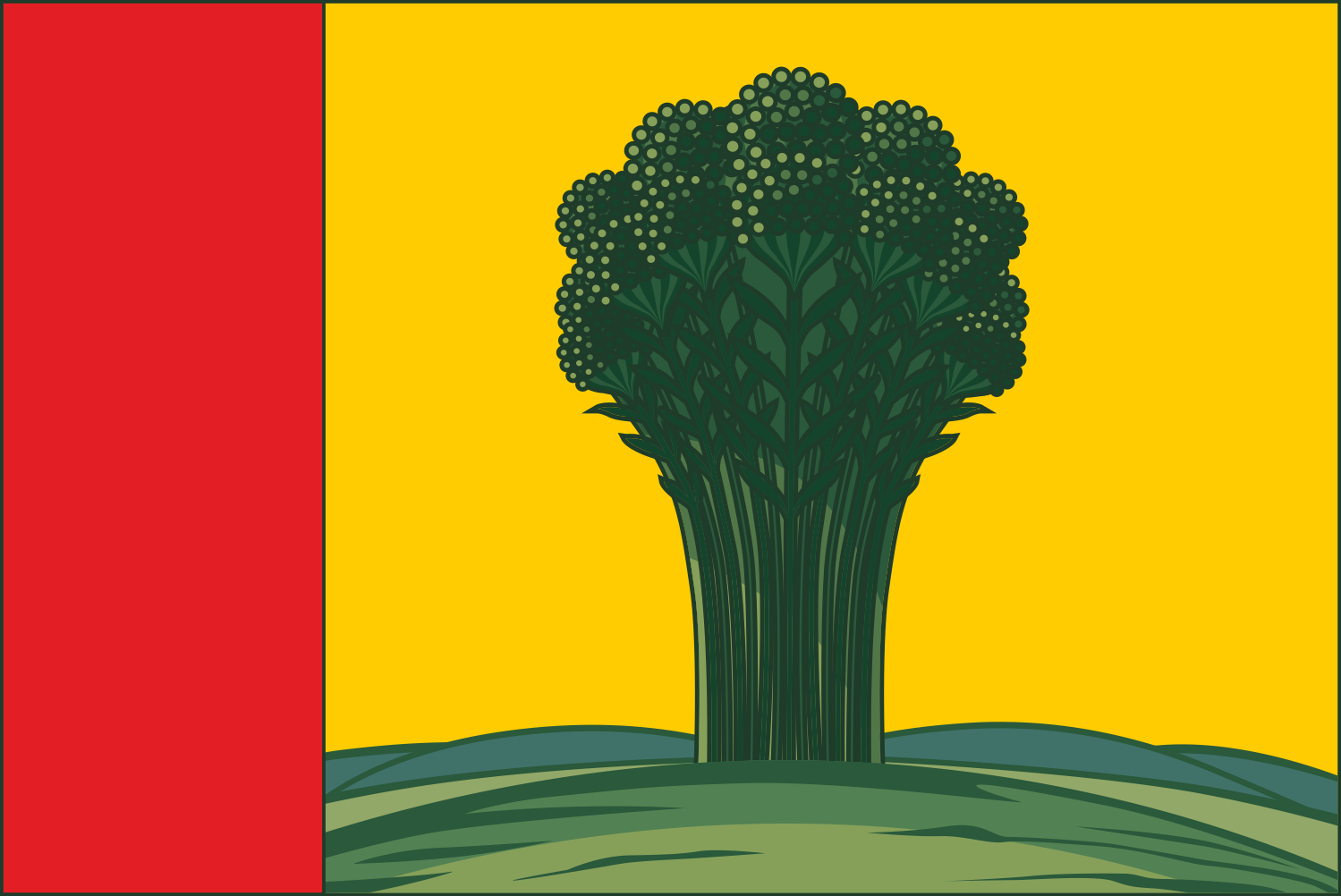
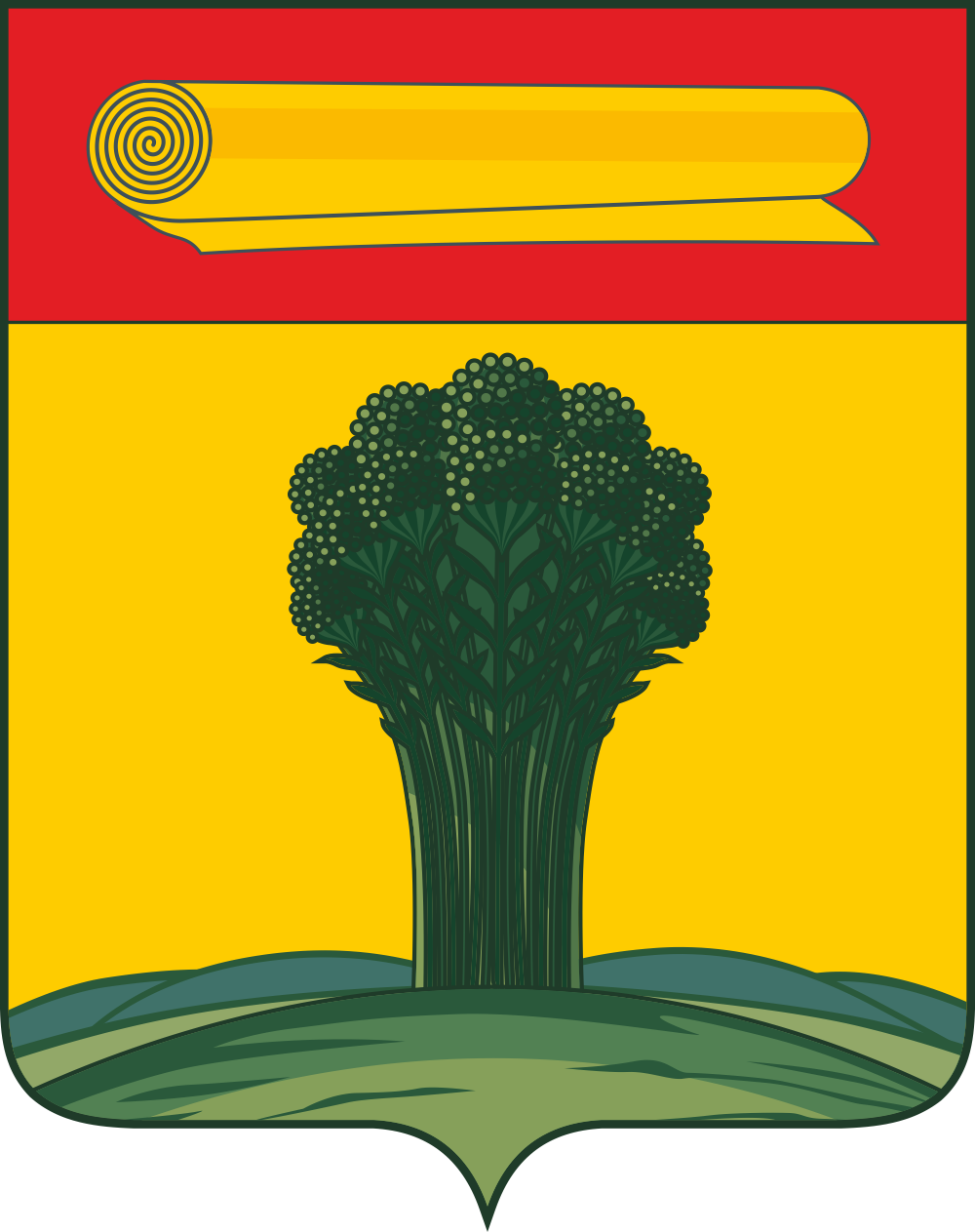
- Flag Coat of arms
- Location of Surazhsky District in Bryansk Oblast
- Coordinates: 53°01′N 32°24′E
- Country: Russia
- Federal subject: Bryansk Oblast
- Established: 1929
- Administrative center: Surazh

Area
  - Total: 1,128 km^{2} (436 sq mi)

Population (2010 Census)
  - Total: 24,623
  - Density: 21.83/km^{2} (56.54/sq mi)
  - Urban: 47.3%
  - Rural: 52.7%

Administrative structure
  - Administrative divisions: 1 Urban administrative okrugs, 7 Rural administrative okrugs
  - Inhabited localities: 1 cities/towns, 120 rural localities

Municipal structure
  - Municipally incorporated as: Surazhsky Municipal District
  - Municipal divisions: 1 urban settlements, 7 rural settlements
- Time zone: UTC+3 (MSK)
- OKTMO ID: 15654000
- Website: http://www.admsur.ru/ (cached)

Surazhsky District (Russian: Сура́жский райо́н) is an administrative and municipal district (raion), one of the twenty-seven in Bryansk Oblast, Russia. It is located in the west of the oblast. The area of the district is 1,128 square kilometers (436 sq mi). Its administrative center is the town of Surazh. Population: 22,345 (2021 census); 24,623 (2010 census); 27,223 (2002 Census); 31,697 (1989 Soviet census). The population of Surazh accounts for 50.0% of the district's total population.

== Ecological problems ==
As a result of the Chernobyl disaster on April 26, 1986, part of the territory of Bryansk Oblast has been contaminated with radionuclides (mainly Gordeyevsky, Klimovsky, Klintsovsky, Krasnogorsky, Surazhsky, and Novozybkovsky Districts). In 1999, some 226,000 people lived in areas with the contamination level above 5 Curie/km^{2}, representing approximately 16% of the oblast's population.
