= Klimovsky District =

Klimovsky District Климовский район
- District
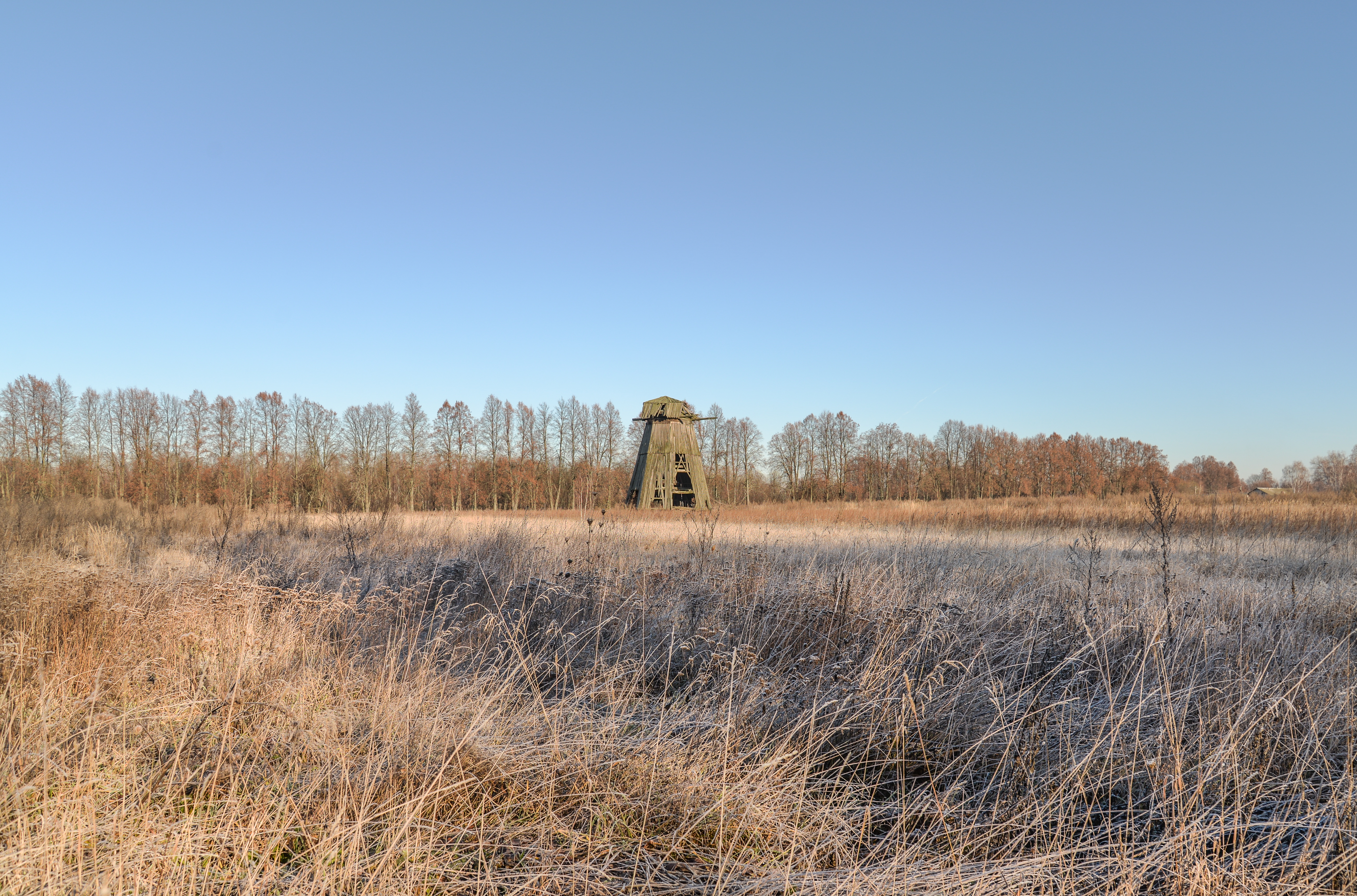

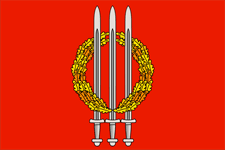
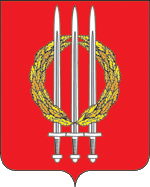
- Flag Coat of arms
- Coordinates: 52°22′59″N 32°11′24″E
- Country: Russia
- Federal subject: Bryansk Oblast
- Established: 1929
- Administrative center: Klimovo

Area
  - Total: 1,554 km^{2} (600 sq mi)

Population (2010 Census)
  - Total: 30,003
  - Density: 19.31/km^{2} (50.00/sq mi)
  - Urban: 46.3%
  - Rural: 53.7%

Administrative structure
  - Administrative divisions: 1 Settlement administrative okrugs, 14 Rural administrative okrugs
  - Inhabited localities: 1 urban-type settlements, 113 rural localities

Municipal structure
  - Municipally incorporated as: Klimovsky Municipal District
  - Municipal divisions: 1 urban settlements, 14 rural settlements
- Time zone: UTC+3 (MSK)
- OKTMO ID: 15628000
- Website: http://kladm.ru/

Klimovsky District (Russian: Климовский райо́н) is an administrative and municipal district (raion), one of the twenty-seven in Bryansk Oblast, Russia. It is located in the southwest of the oblast. The area of the district is 1,554 square kilometers (600 sq mi). Its administrative center is the urban locality (a work settlement) of Klimovo. Population: 25,897 (2021 Census); 30,003 (2010 Census); 34,556 (2002 Census); 40,119 (1989 Soviet census). The population of Klimovo accounts for 52.3% of the district's total population.

== Ecological problems ==
As a result of the Chernobyl disaster on April 26, 1986, part of the territory of Bryansk Oblast has been contaminated with radionuclides (mainly Gordeyevsky, Klimovsky, Klintsovsky, Krasnogorsky, Surazhsky, and Novozybkovsky Districts). In 1999, some 226,000 people lived in areas with the contamination level above 5 Curie/km^{2}, representing approximately 16% of the oblast's population.
