= Andrei Grechishko =

Russian footballer

Personal information
- Full name: Andrei Aleksandrovich Grechishko
- Date of birth: 7 March 1986 (age 40)
- Place of birth: Bryansk, Russian SFSR
- Height: 1.82 m (5 ft 11 1/2 in)
- Position: Midfielder

Senior career*
Years	Team	Apps	(Gls)
2007–2008	DYuSSh-Dynamo Bryansk		
2008–2009	FC Dynamo Bryansk	8	(0)
2009	FC Yelets	2	(0)
2010	FC Magnit Zheleznogrosk		
2011	FC Gubkin	4	(0)
2012	FC Magnit Zheleznogrosk		
2013–2014	FC Khimik-Rossosh		
2014–2015	FC ArsenaL Bryansk		
- * Club domestic league appearances and goals

Andrei Aleksandrovich Grechishko (Russian: Андрей Александрович Гречишко; born 7 March 1986) is a former Russian professional football player.

== Club career ==
He played in the Russian Football National League for FC Dynamo Bryansk in 2008.
