= Roman Lev =

Russian footballer

Personal information
- Full name: Roman Aleksandrovich Lev
- Date of birth: 10 December 1993 (age 32)
- Place of birth: Bryansk, Russia
- Height: 1.80 m (5 ft 11 in)
- Position: Midfielder

Youth career
- Stankostroitel Voronezh
- FC Dynamo Moscow

Senior career*
Years	Team	Apps	(Gls)
2012–2014	FC Fakel Voronezh	16	(0)
2014	FC Vybor-Kurbatovo Voronezh	3	(0)
- * Club domestic league appearances and goals

Roman Aleksandrovich Lev (Russian: Роман Александрович Лев; born 10 December 1993) is a former Russian professional football player.

== Club career ==
He made his Russian Football National League debut for FC Fakel Voronezh on 8 May 2012 in a game against FC Torpedo Vladimir.
