= Bryansk =

City in Bryansk Oblast, Russia

Bryansk Брянск
- City
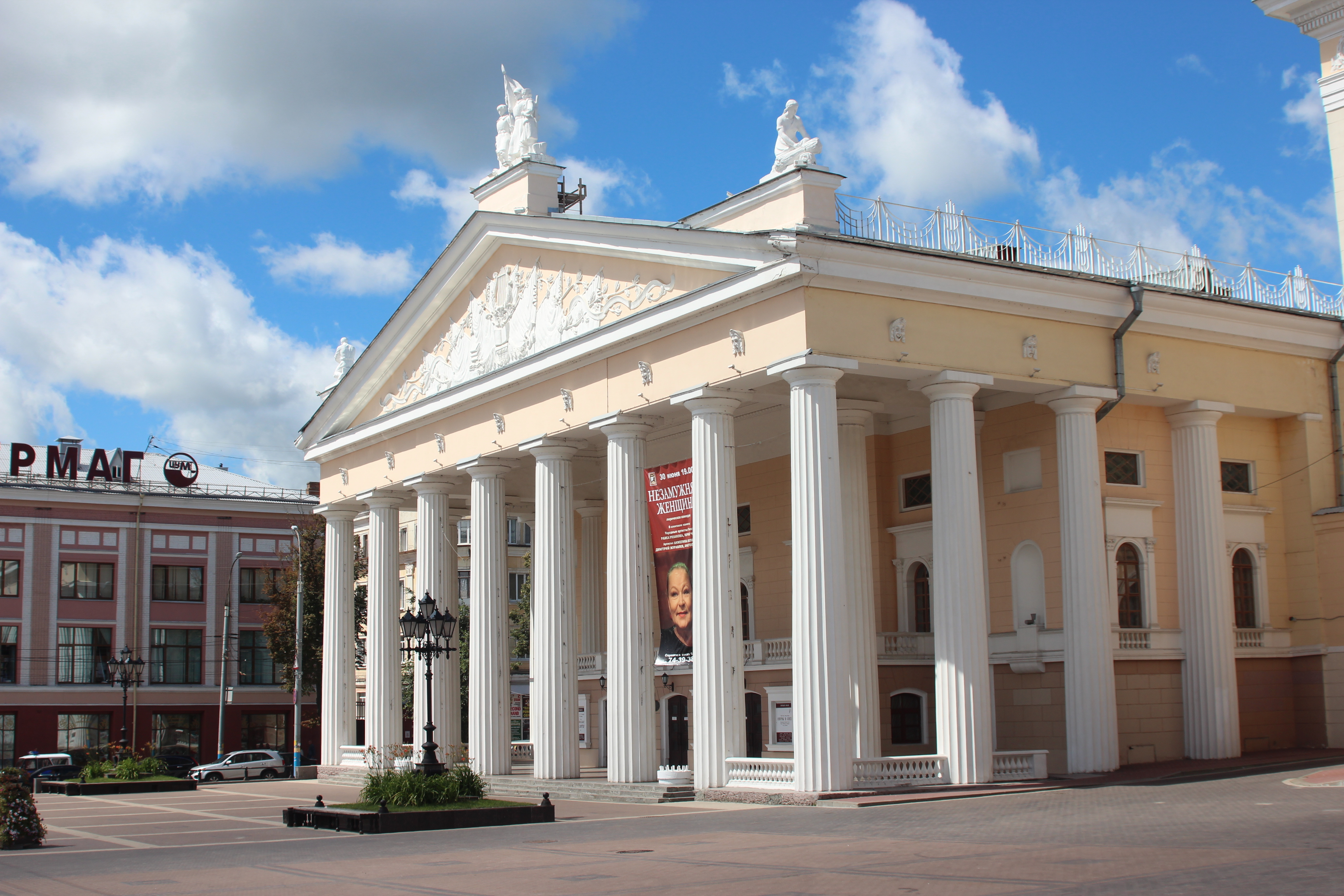
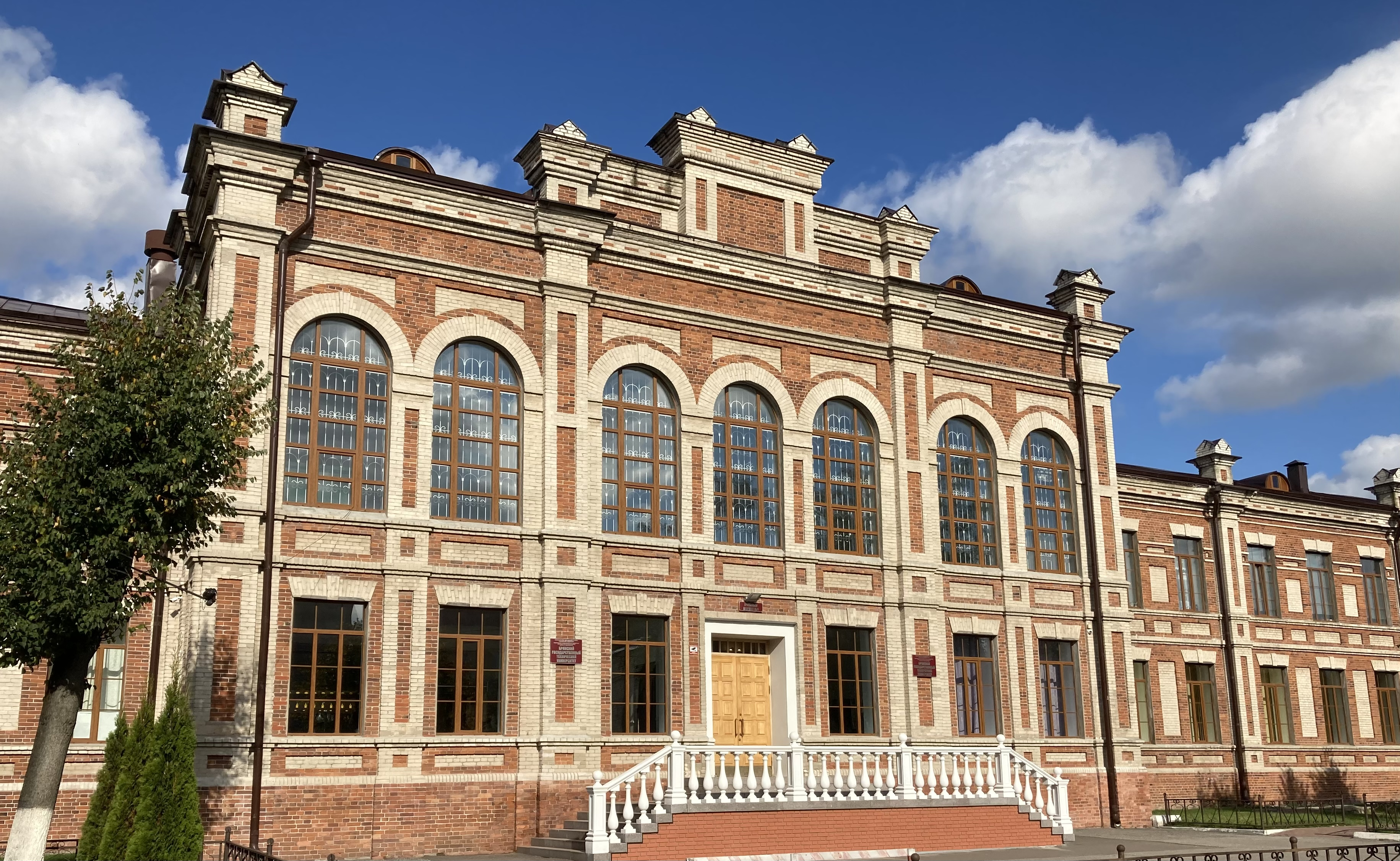
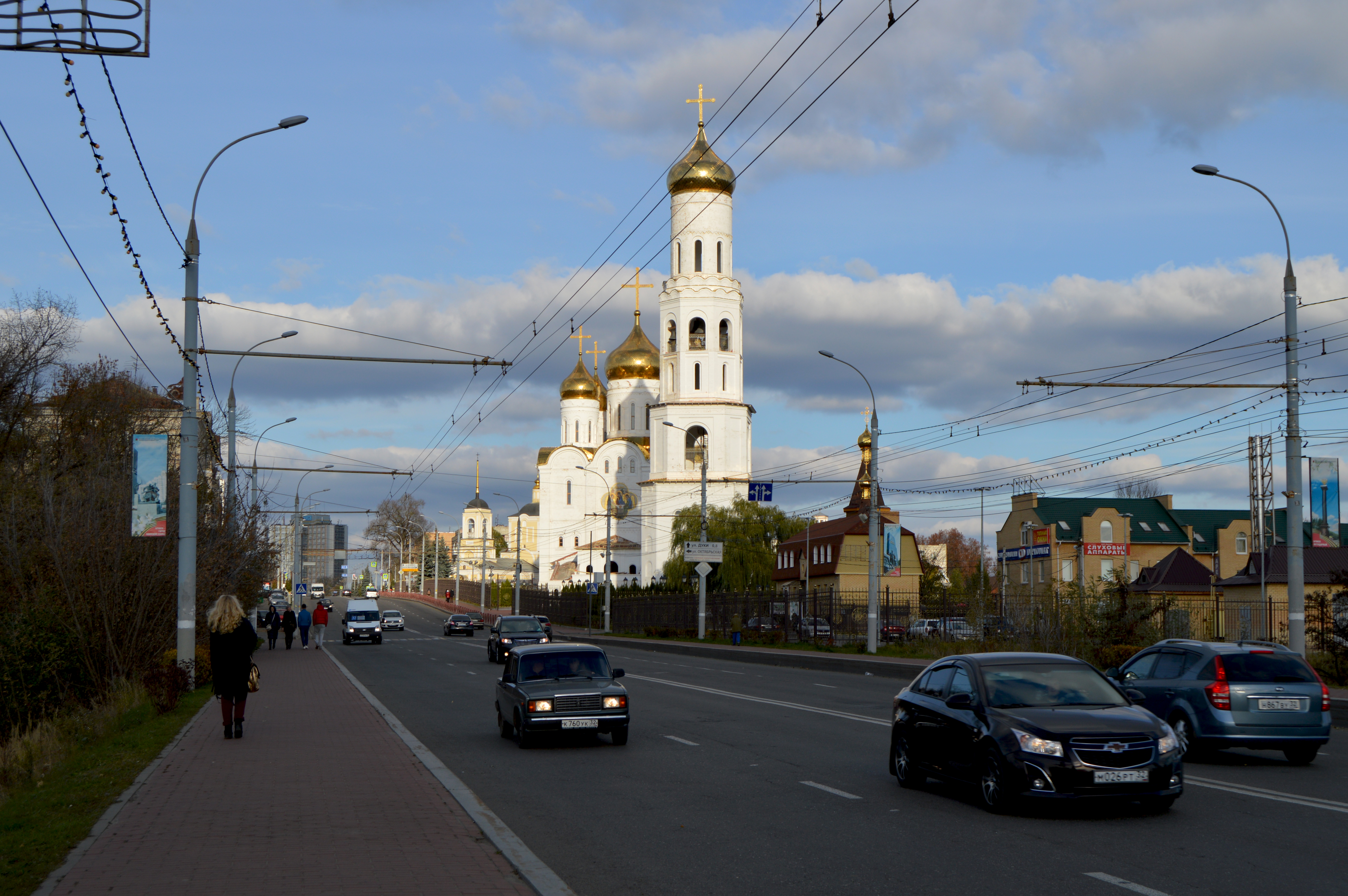
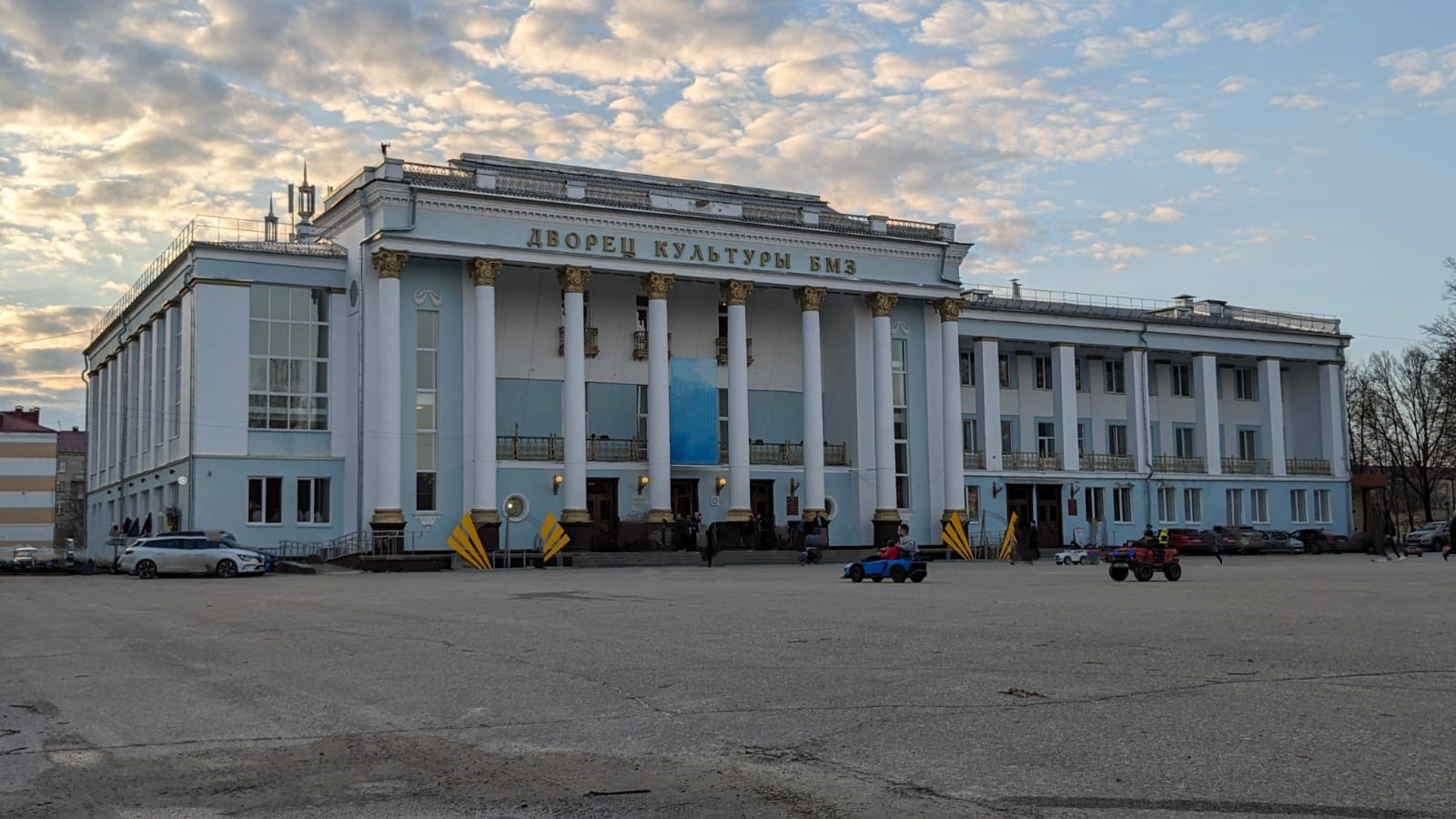
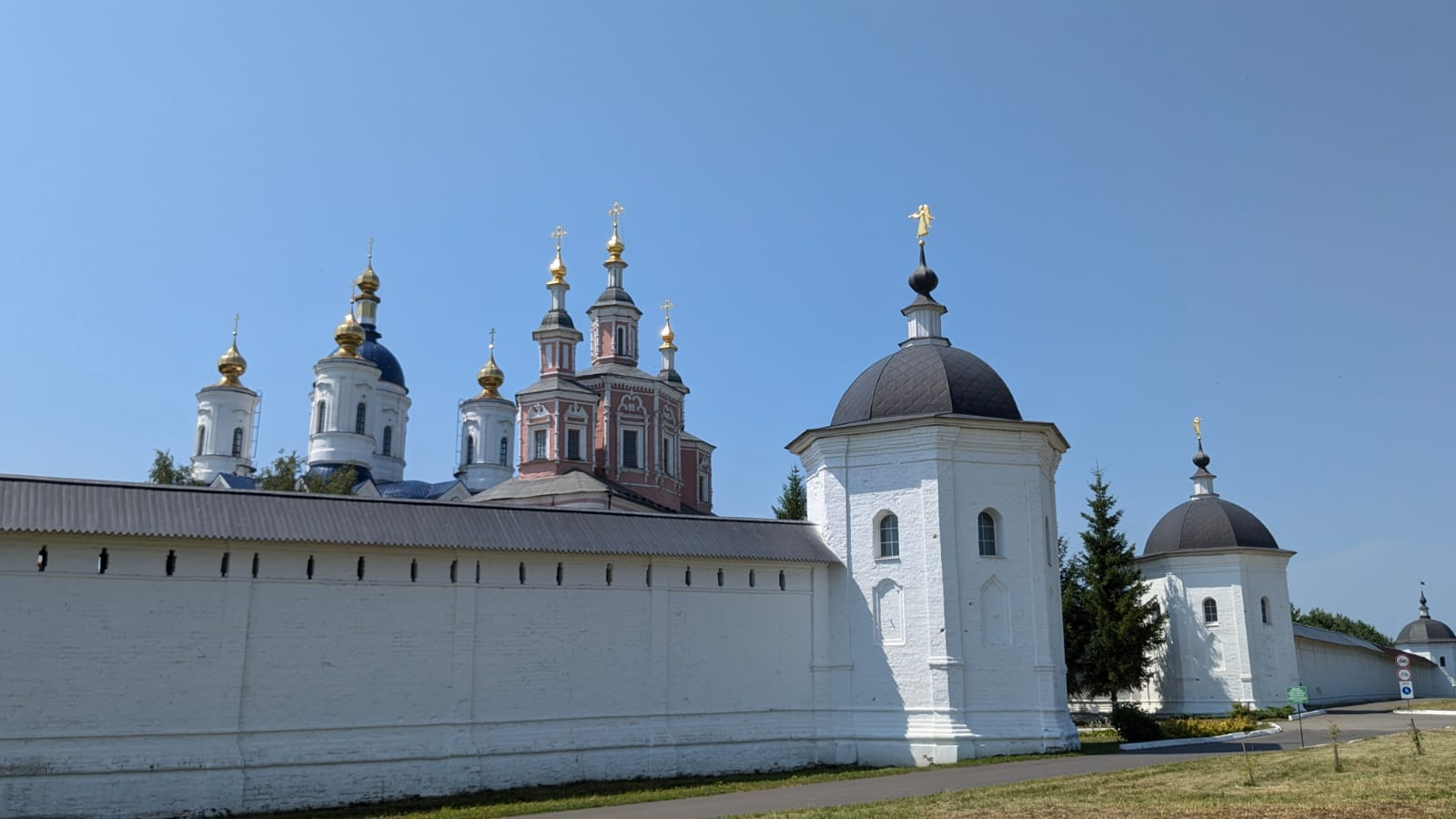
- Bryansk Drama Theater Bryansk State Technical University Peresvet bell tower BMZ Palace of Culture Svensky Monastery

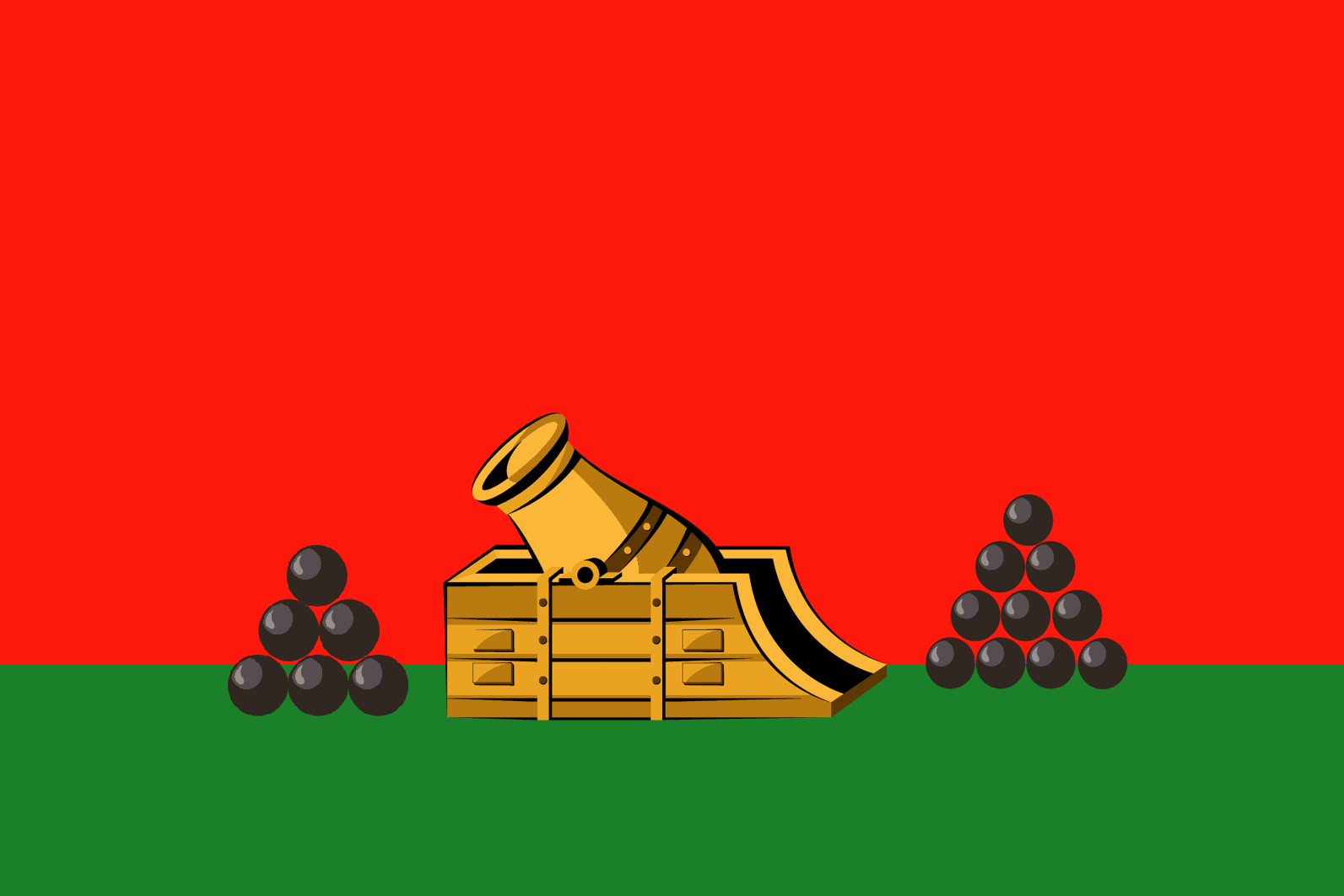
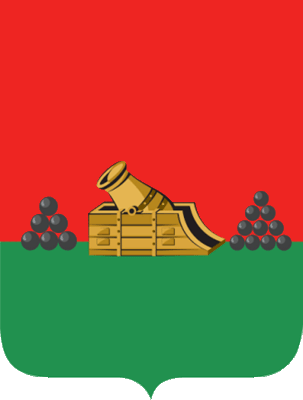
- Flag Coat of arms
- Interactive map of Bryansk
- Location of Bryansk Bryansk (European Russia) Bryansk (Russia) Bryansk (Europe)
- Coordinates: 53°14′33″N 34°22′00″E
- Country: Russia
- Federal subject: Bryansk Oblast
- Founded: 985

Government
  - Body: Council of People's Deputies
  - Head: Marina Dbar

Area
  - Total: 186.73 km^{2} (72.10 sq mi)
- Elevation: 190 m (620 ft)

Population (2010 Census)
  - Total: 415,721
  - Estimate (2025): 426,225 (+2.5%)
  - Rank: 41st in 2010
  - Density: 2,226.3/km^{2} (5,766.1/sq mi)

Administrative status
  - Subordinated to: Bryansky Urban Administrative Okrug (city of oblast significance)
  - Capital of: Bryansk Oblast, Bryansky Urban Administrative Okrug

Municipal status
  - Urban okrug: Bryansk Urban Okrug
  - Capital of: Bryansk Urban Okrug
- Time zone: UTC+3 (MSK)
- Postal codes: 241000–241002, 241004, 241006, 241007, 241010–241025, 241027–241031, 241033, 241035–241041, 241044, 241044, 241047, 241050, 241890, 241899, 241960–241967, 241970, 241980–241983, 241985, 241988, 241991
- Dialing code: +7 4832
- OKTMO ID: 15701000001
- City Day: September 17
- Website: www.bga32.ru

Bryansk (Russian: Брянск, IPA: [brʲansk]) is a city and the administrative center of Bryansk Oblast, Russia, situated on the Desna River, 379 kilometers (235 mi) southwest of Moscow. It has a population of 379,152 at the 2021 census.

Bryansk is one of the oldest cities in the oblast, with 985 regarded as the year of foundation. It was part of the Kievan Rus', Mongol Empire and Lithuania during the medieval period, then was contested by Moscow and Poland–Lithuania in the early modern period, before ultimately passing to Russia, within which it was a major regional trading center.

== History ==
=== Medieval period ===
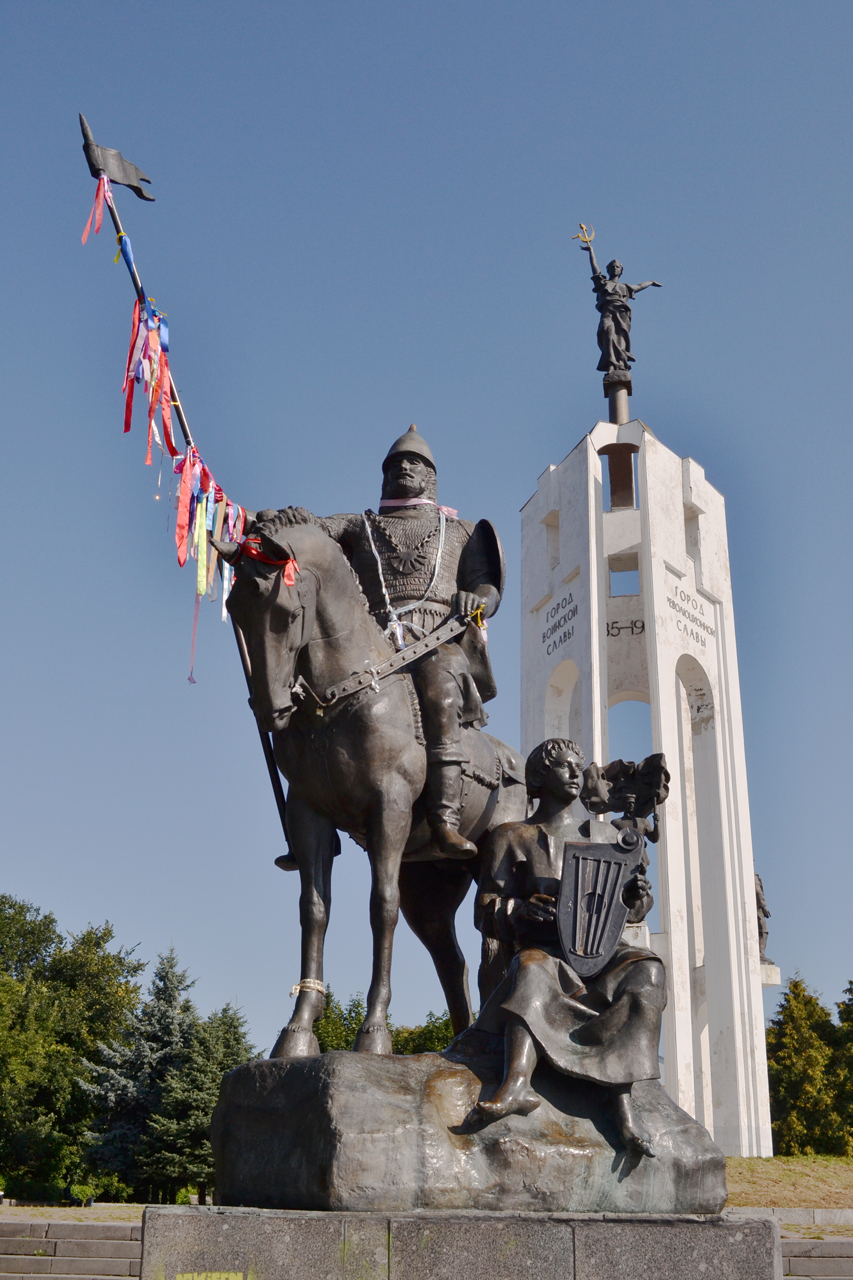
A monument to Alexander Peresvet and Boyan

Based on excavations at the end of the 20th century, information was found on the birth of the city in the 10th century on the Chashin Kurgan. For ease of perception, the conventional date of birth was chosen as 985 AD.

The first written mention of Bryansk, as Debryansk, dates to 1146 in the Kievan Chronicle. The name appears variously as Дъбряньск, Дьбряньск, and in other spellings. Etymologically, it derives from "дъбръ", a Slavic word for "ditch", "lowland", or "dense woodland"; the area was known for its dense woods, of which very little remains today. Local authorities and archaeologists, however, believe that the town had existed as early as 985 as a fortified settlement on the right bank of the Desna River.

Bryansk remained poorly attested until the 1237–1242 Mongol invasion of Kievan Rus'. It was the northernmost of the Severian cities in the possession of the Olgovichi clan of Chernigov. After the Mongols executed Prince Mikhail of Chernigov in 1246 and his capital was destroyed, his purported son Roman Mikhailovich moved his seat to Bryansk. In 1310, when the Mongols sacked the town again, it belonged to the Principality of Smolensk.

Grand Duke Algirdas of Lithuania acquired Bryansk through inheritance in 1356 and gave it to his son, Dmitry the Elder. Until the end of the century Grand Duke Jogaila of Lithuania, Grand Duke Vytautas of Lithuania, the future Grand Duke Švitrigaila of Lithuania, and Grand Duke Yury of Smolensk contested control of the town.

=== Modern period ===
The Grand Duchy of Moscow conquered Bryansk following the Battle of Vedrosha in 1503. The town was turned into a fortress which played a major role during the Time of Troubles (1598–1613). During the Time of Troubles the Polish–Lithuanian Commonwealth occupied the town in 1610, and it remained in Polish-Lithuanian hands as part of Smolensk Voivodeship until the Truce of Deulino in 1634. In 1709 Tsar Peter the Great incorporated Bryansk into the Kiev Governorate, but Empress Catherine the Great deemed it wise to transfer the town to the newly-formed Oryol Governorate in 1779. She also promulgated the town's coat of arms (August 1781).

In the 17th and 18th centuries the economy of Bryansk, which had become a regional trading center, was based on the Svenskaya fair (Russian: Свенская ярмарка), the largest in European Russia. The fair took place annually under the auspices of the nearby Svensky Monastery. After the town started to manufacture cannon and ammunition for the Imperial Russian Navy in 1783, Bryansk evolved from a regional market town into an important industrial center for metallurgy and textiles. The city's population exceeded 30,000 by 1917. In 1812 Napoleon's Grande Armée fought the Russians in Bryansk and in Oryol during the French invasion of Russia.

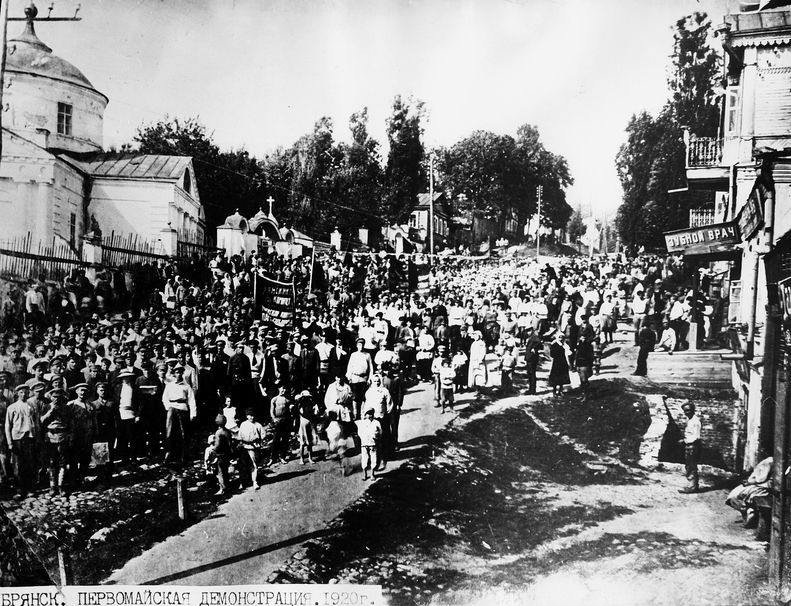
May Day at former Christmas Mountain (now Yuri Gagarin Boulevard) in 1920

In 1918 the Belarusian People's Republic and Ukrainian People’s Republic both claimed Bryansk, but Bolshevik forces took the town in 1919.

During World War II the German Wehrmacht captured Bryansk and encircled the Soviet 3rd, 13th and 50th armies. The town remained under Axis occupation from October 6, 1941 to September 17, 1943, with the city left heavily damaged by fighting. The occupiers operated a Nazi prison in the city. About 60,000 Soviet partisans were active in and around Bryansk, inflicting heavy losses on the German Army. In 1944, soon after its liberation, Bryansk became the administrative center of Bryansk Oblast.

=== Recent history ===
In 2016 the city council approved a new general city plan, which called among others for laying of a new route from Burov Street along the Bolva River to Vokzalnaya Street with the intersection of the railway and Bolva. In the southern direction, it is proposed to extend the road along the Desna to the Fokinsky District to Moskovsky Prospekt, construction of a road from the Black Bridge along the Karachizh ravine with the intersection of Stanke Dimitrova Avenue to Sakharova Street, reconstruction of Sakharova Street to the bypass road and the R120 highway, as well as development of the area of the old airport (area of Gorbatova, Stepnaya streets).

A large fire was noted at an oil depot on April 25, 2022. Speculation was that it might have been a result of military action during the 2022 Russian invasion of Ukraine.

In the Bryansk school shooting on December 7, 2023, a 14-year-old girl took a shotgun to her school and fired several shots at schoolmates. She killed one and wounded five before killing herself.

== Demographics ==
Historical population

Year	Pop.	±%
1897	24,500	—
1926	43,937	+79.3%
1939	87,490	+99.1%
1959	207,319	+137.0%
1970	317,504	+53.1%

Year	Pop.	±%
1979	394,210	+24.2%
1989	452,160	+14.7%
2002	431,526	−4.6%
2010	415,721	−3.7%
2021	379,152	−8.8%

Source: Census data

== Geography ==
=== Urban layout ===
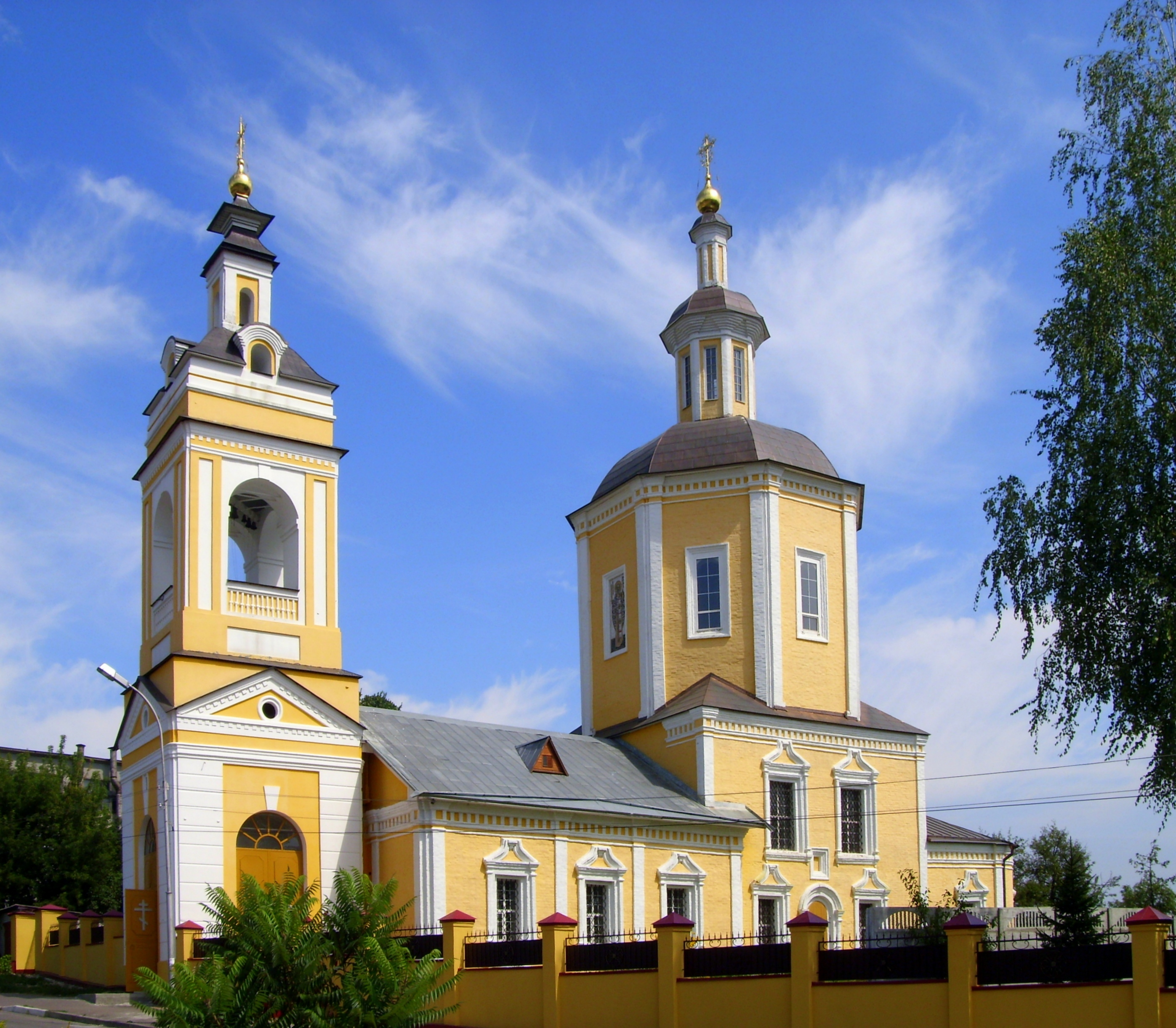
Gorno-Nikolskaya Church

The location of the settlement was originally associated with navigable river-routes and was located in the area of the Chashin Kurgan, where the fortress walls were erected. For reasons that have not yet been clarified, the city changed its location and by the middle of the 12th century had established itself on the steep slopes of the right bank of the Desna on Pokrovskaya Hill (Russian: Покровская гора). The foundations of the future urban development of the city were laid even earlier, when around the city-fortress in the 17th century after the Time of Troubles of 1598–1613 on the coastal strip at the foot of the Bryansk fortress the posadskaya "Zatinnaya Sloboda" was upset, and on the upper plateau, between Verkhniy Sudok and White Kolodez - the "Streletskaya Sloboda".

Somewhat earlier behind the posad (the territory between the fortress and the Peter-Pavlovsky monastery), after the annexation of Bryansk to the Moscow state and the organization of the Yamskaya service in 1503, the Yamskaya Sloboda appeared. Zatinnaya Sloboda is located on the site of the ancient "Zhitny Gorod" - a fortified territory of food warehouses and salt storages. Later, the settlement gave way to a cannon yard, on the site of which the Arsenal was located in the 18th century.

The general plan of the city of Bryansk plan laid the foundations for the development of the city in a regular system designed to streamline the existing buildings for centuries, limit the spontaneous growth of the city, and create a new community center. In the drawing, the territory of the upper plateau was covered with a geometrical grid of quarters formed by streets going down to the Desna and perpendicular to them.

Three squares were "strung" on two of them: Sobornaya - on the coastal Moskovskaya street, Krasnaya gorodskaya - in the center of the plateau and Shchepnaya market - on the western border of the city (by the entrance to the present-day Dynamo stadium). The plan captures the historical layout. The city is spread out on the right bank of the Desna. It was a picturesque group of different-sized, irregularly shaped quarters. The city center did not stand out in terms of planning, it was defined by a fortress on Pokrovskaya Hill, dominating the city.

Streets descending from the upper plateau were united into one, following along the bank of the Desna. The city was almost entirely wooden, with the exception of only a few stone (mainly religious) buildings. The street network included all buildings significant at that time. The central quarters were designated for the construction of stone public, commercial and residential buildings. Red (Krasnaya) Square was to be decorated with the buildings of public offices, magistrates and commercial institutions; the market square - built up with handicraft enterprises, smithies and shops.

The plan as revised in 1802 significantly increased the territory of the city and included in the regular system not only the coastal area and the area between Sudki, but also the Petrovskaya Gora area and Yamskaya Sloboda with Forest Sheds in the north and north-east, the area between the White Kolodez ravine and the Podar River on south; it increased the territory of the central part in the northwest behind the market square. The quarters were enlarged, the streets classified, and squares located on a larger scale to the territory of the city.

Smolenskaya Street - in common parlance Rozhdestvenskaya Gora (now Sovetskaya Street - Gagarin Boulevard) - is the main highway connecting the upland part with the coastal one. It connects three squares: Cathedral, Red and Sennaya (former Shchepnaya). Two other highways run in the longitudinal direction: Bolshaya Moskovskaya (now Kalinin Street) in the coastal part and Petropavlovskaya-Voskresenskaya Street (now Lenin Avenue), which unites the city in the upland part.

Petropavlovskaya and Voskresenskaya streets, continuing it, crossing the whole city, at the intersection with Trubchevskaya (now Krasnoarmeyskaya) street ended in a new, fourth square - Khlebnaya (on the site of the modern Partizanskaya Square, there was once a mill on this place). From here there were roads to Trubchevsk and Karachev. All squares were square. At the beginning of the 19th century, out of 867 houses in the city, only 25 were of stone; out of 17 stone churches there were 10. A little more than a dozen buildings built in the second half of the 18th century have survived to this day.

The unique architectural silhouette of the city, which was formed by the beginning of the 19th century, was skilfully expanded and enlarged by the end of the century. In the center, on the territory of the Spaso-Polikarpov Monastery, the Novopokrovsky Cathedral was erected (1862–1897), which emphasized the planning center of the district town with its scale. On the right flank there was a building of a trade and craft school, built by the architect N. A. Lebedev, which linked the building of the Arsenal plant and the Tikhvin church into a single chain of historical buildings.

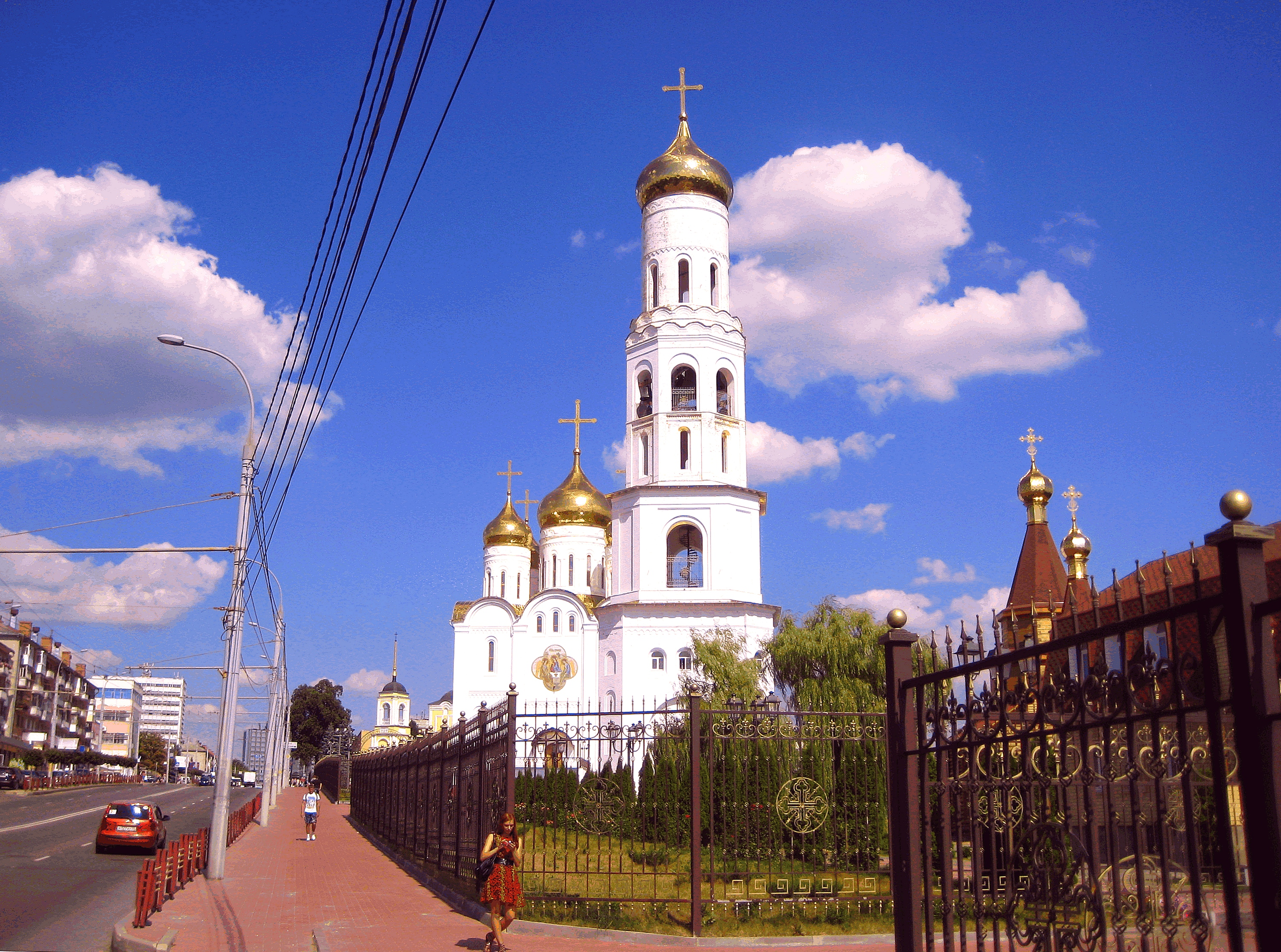
Holy Trinity Orthodox cathedral

The first isographic depiction of the city is an 1857 panorama from the left bank of the Desna, painted in watercolor by self-taught artist Gabriel Vasilyevich Khludov, a draftsman of the Bryansk Arsenal. In the center of the picture is Pokrovskaya Hill with the stone church of the same name and a bell tower, at the bottom right of the Arsenal building, then the Resurrection, Nikolskaya and Trinity churches, the ensemble of the Peter-Pavlovsky Monastery, and in the foreground - the Ascension Church of the Zaretskaya Sloboda.

It is not definitively known when the first Bryansk fortress appeared as a long-term fortification. The reports of the governor of 1629, and paintings from 1678, 1682, 1685, 1686 testify that the fortress on Pokrovskaya Hill was cut down, like in the old days, from oak logs and consisted of walls with towers. Inventories noted that the fortress was built on a native mountain. The city - "oak, chopped, covered with planks" - included a system of blind and drive-through towers connected by walls, supplemented by embankments and a wooden "standing prison in one log".

The fortress had towers: Spasskaya, Arkhangelskaya, Bezymyannaya, Bushuevskaya, the first and second Voskresensky, Nikolskaya, Pyatnitskaya, Rukavnaya, Sudkovskaya, Prechistenskaya, Rozhdestvenskaya, Georgievskaya, Karachevskaya and Tainichnaya. The fortress of the "old" and "new" cities had a certain number of towers and a different amount of weapons.

The fortress was described at the beginning of the 18th century: "an ancient fortress in the city of Bryansk occupied the top of a small mountain, but with rather steep slopes and, in terms of its position relative to the city located on the right bank of the Desna, constituted a citadel. Its fortified fence was in an irregular quadrangle, at the corners of which there were small ledges. They were joined by a chain retransmission, placed on one of the ledges of a raised area."

=== Climate ===
Bryansk has a warm-summer humid continental climate (Köppen climate classification Dfb).

Climate data for Bryansk (1991–2020, extremes 1928–present)
Month	Jan	Feb	Mar	Apr	May	Jun	Jul	Aug	Sep	Oct	Nov	Dec	Year
Record high °C (°F)	7.6 (45.7)	9.9 (49.8)	23.5 (74.3)	28.3 (82.9)	32.2 (90.0)	34.9 (94.8)	37.7 (99.9)	38.4 (101.1)	30.7 (87.3)	24.8 (76.6)	17.1 (62.8)	9.9 (49.8)	38.4 (101.1)
Mean daily maximum °C (°F)	−3.3 (26.1)	−2.3 (27.9)	3.5 (38.3)	12.7 (54.9)	19.6 (67.3)	22.8 (73.0)	24.6 (76.3)	23.5 (74.3)	17.3 (63.1)	10.0 (50.0)	2.3 (36.1)	−2.1 (28.2)	10.7 (51.3)
Daily mean °C (°F)	−5.7 (21.7)	−5.2 (22.6)	−0.3 (31.5)	7.7 (45.9)	14.1 (57.4)	17.6 (63.7)	19.5 (67.1)	18.1 (64.6)	12.5 (54.5)	6.3 (43.3)	0.1 (32.2)	−4.1 (24.6)	6.7 (44.1)
Mean daily minimum °C (°F)	−8.1 (17.4)	−8.1 (17.4)	−3.7 (25.3)	3.2 (37.8)	8.8 (47.8)	12.5 (54.5)	14.6 (58.3)	13.2 (55.8)	8.3 (46.9)	3.1 (37.6)	−2.0 (28.4)	−6.3 (20.7)	3.0 (37.4)
Record low °C (°F)	−41.8 (−43.2)	−34.9 (−30.8)	−29.6 (−21.3)	−21.8 (−7.2)	−4.2 (24.4)	−1.3 (29.7)	2.2 (36.0)	0.1 (32.2)	−5.2 (22.6)	−13.0 (8.6)	−23.6 (−10.5)	−38.6 (−37.5)	−41.8 (−43.2)
Average precipitation mm (inches)	46 (1.8)	42 (1.7)	38 (1.5)	38 (1.5)	65 (2.6)	74 (2.9)	83 (3.3)	60 (2.4)	70 (2.8)	56 (2.2)	50 (2.0)	50 (2.0)	672 (26.5)
Average rainy days	7	6	8	14	16	18	17	14	16	16	14	10	156
Average snowy days	23	21	14	4	0.4	0	0	0	0.4	4	14	22	103
Average relative humidity (%)	85	82	76	68	65	69	71	72	77	81	87	87	77
Mean monthly sunshine hours	18.6	58.8	133.3	180.0	282.1	264.0	294.5	260.4	171.0	83.7	27.0	21.7	1,795.1
Source 1: Pogoda.ru.net
Source 2: Climatebase (sun, 1949–2011)

== Administrative and municipal status ==
The Administrative divisions of Bryansk consists of four districts; Bezhitsa, Zelenivka, Sovietsky District and Fokinsky District.

Bryansk is the administrative center of the oblast. Within the framework of administrative divisions, it is, together with three work settlements (Belye Berega, Bolshoye Polpino, and Raditsa-Krylovka), incorporated separately as Bryansky Urban Administrative Okrug—an administrative unit with the status equal to that of the districts. As a municipal division, Bryansky Urban Administrative Okrug is incorporated as Bryansk Urban Okrug.

== Economy ==
Today Bryansk is an important center for machinery manufacturing, and is home to many large factories. The main industries are machine building, metalworking, chemical, electrical equipment, electronics, wood, textile and food industries, locomotives, diesel engines, freight cars, motor graders, pavers and other road equipment, agricultural equipment, construction materials, and garments.

=== Transportation ===
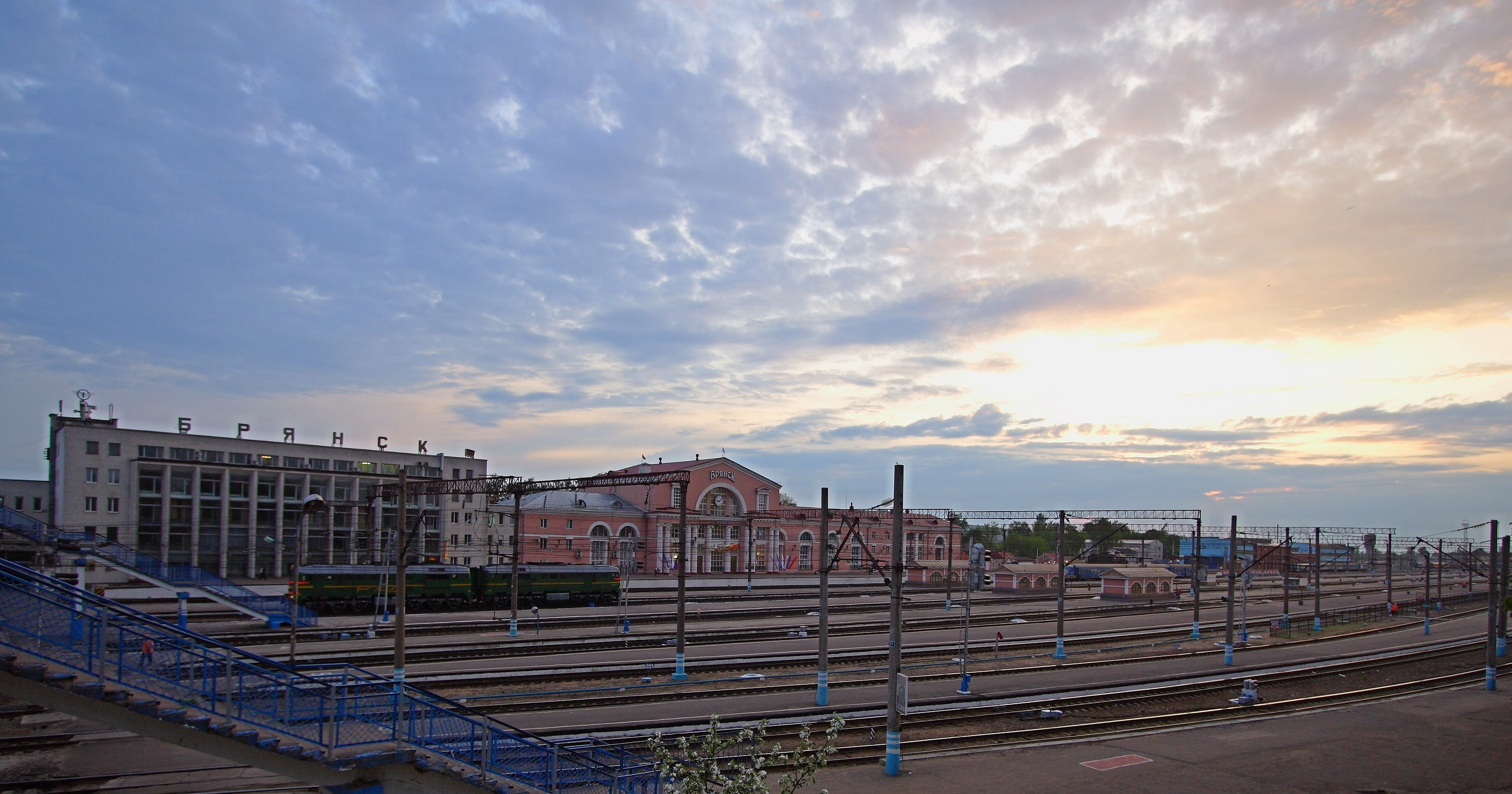
Bryansk-I (Orlovsky Railway station), May 2010

Since 1868, there is a railway connection. The city has railway stations: Bryansk Orlovsky and Bryansk-Lgovskiy (Bryansk Bryansk -I and -II, respectively), Ordzhonikidzegrad; Peresvet Street Bus Station and Bezhitsa bus station. fourteen kilometres (9 miles) west of the city lies the Bryansk International Airport.

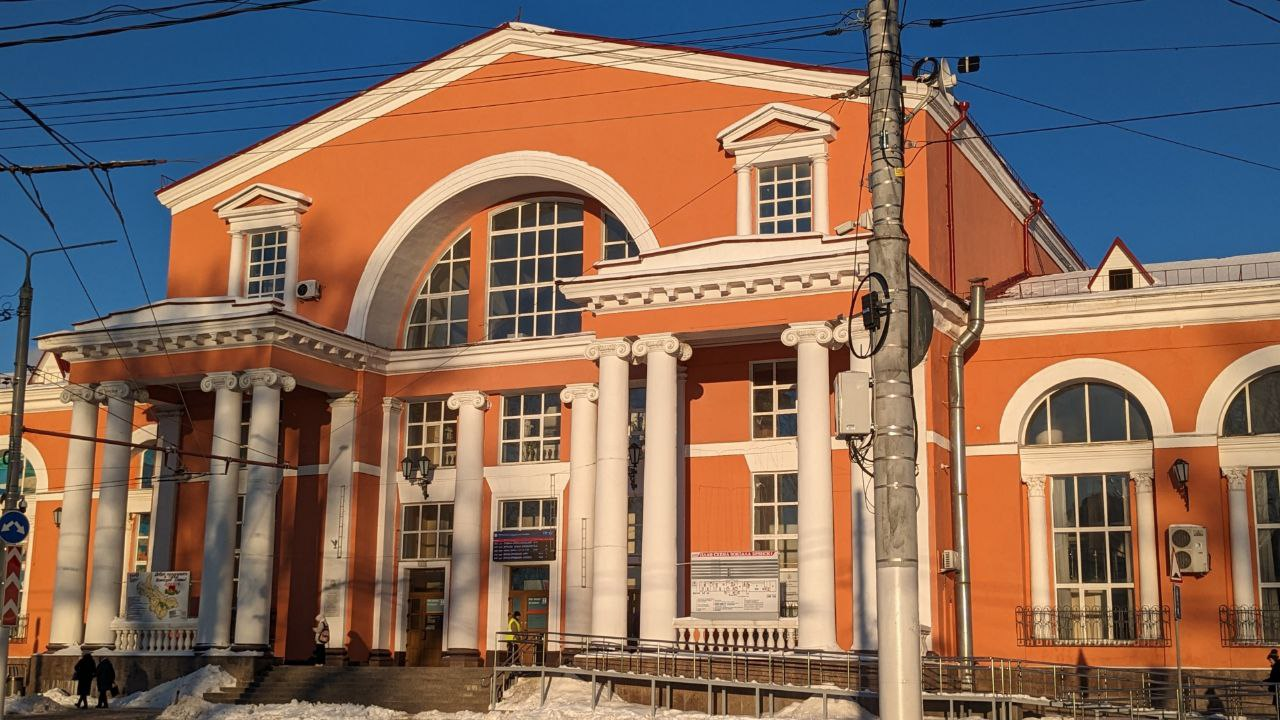
Main entrance to Bryansk-Orlovsky Railway station

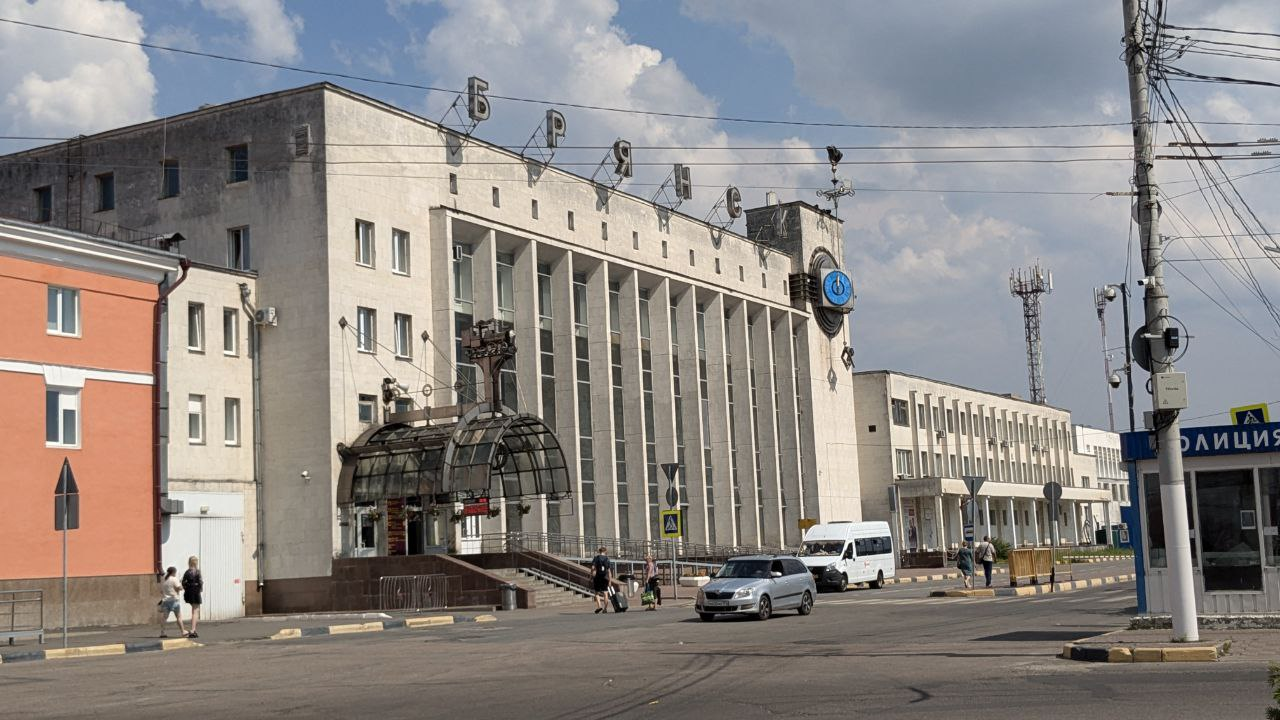
New building of the Bryansk-Orlovsky station for long-distance train ticket offices

Passenger traffic carried by bus (more than 1,400 cars on 54 permanent urban routes), trolley on 10 regular routes, uses (36 routes), as well as commuter trains and railcars. The cost of public transport (trolley buses) is 16 rubles, and buses, 20 rubles (as of May 2018).

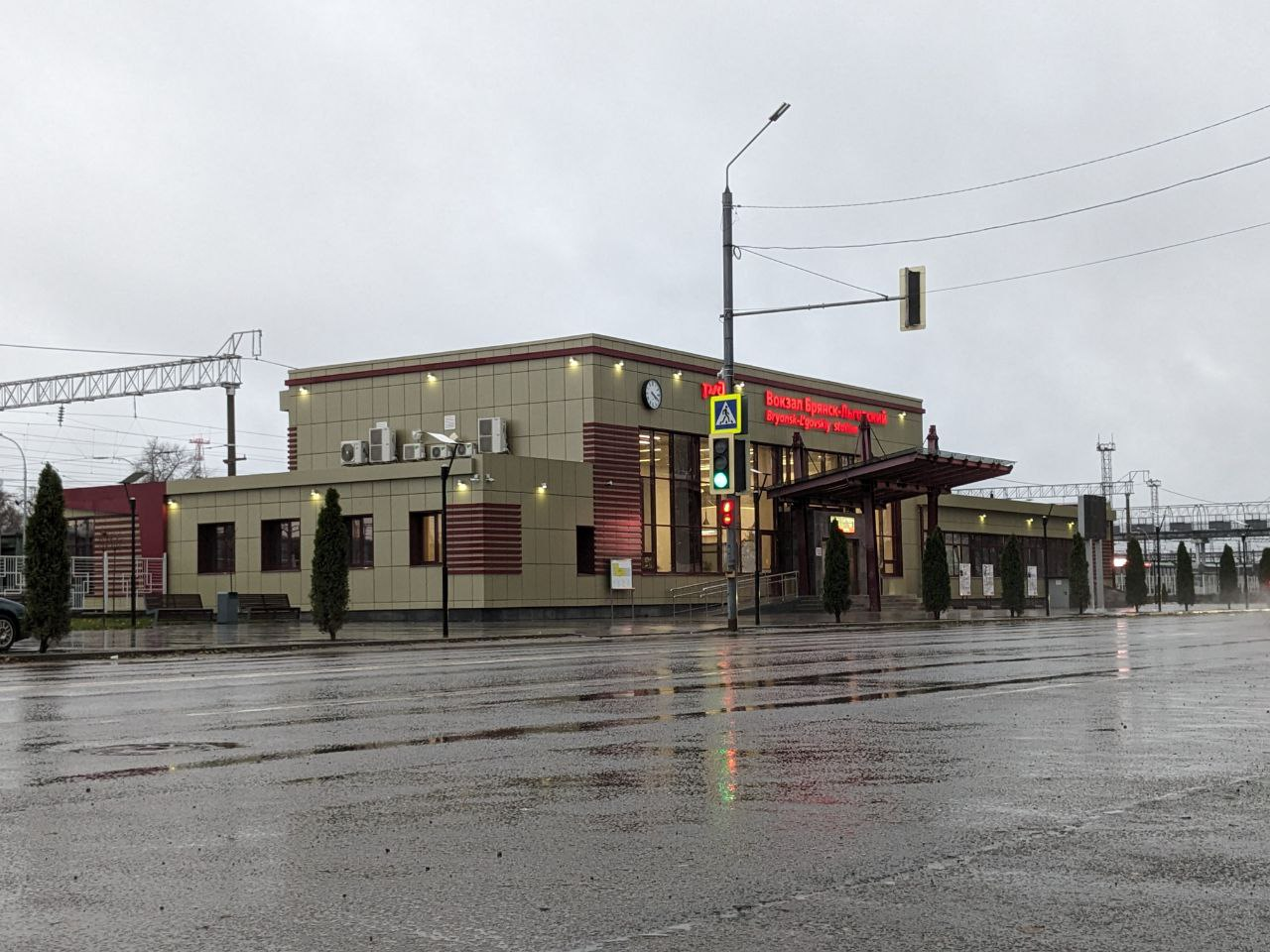
Bryansk-L'govskiy Railway station

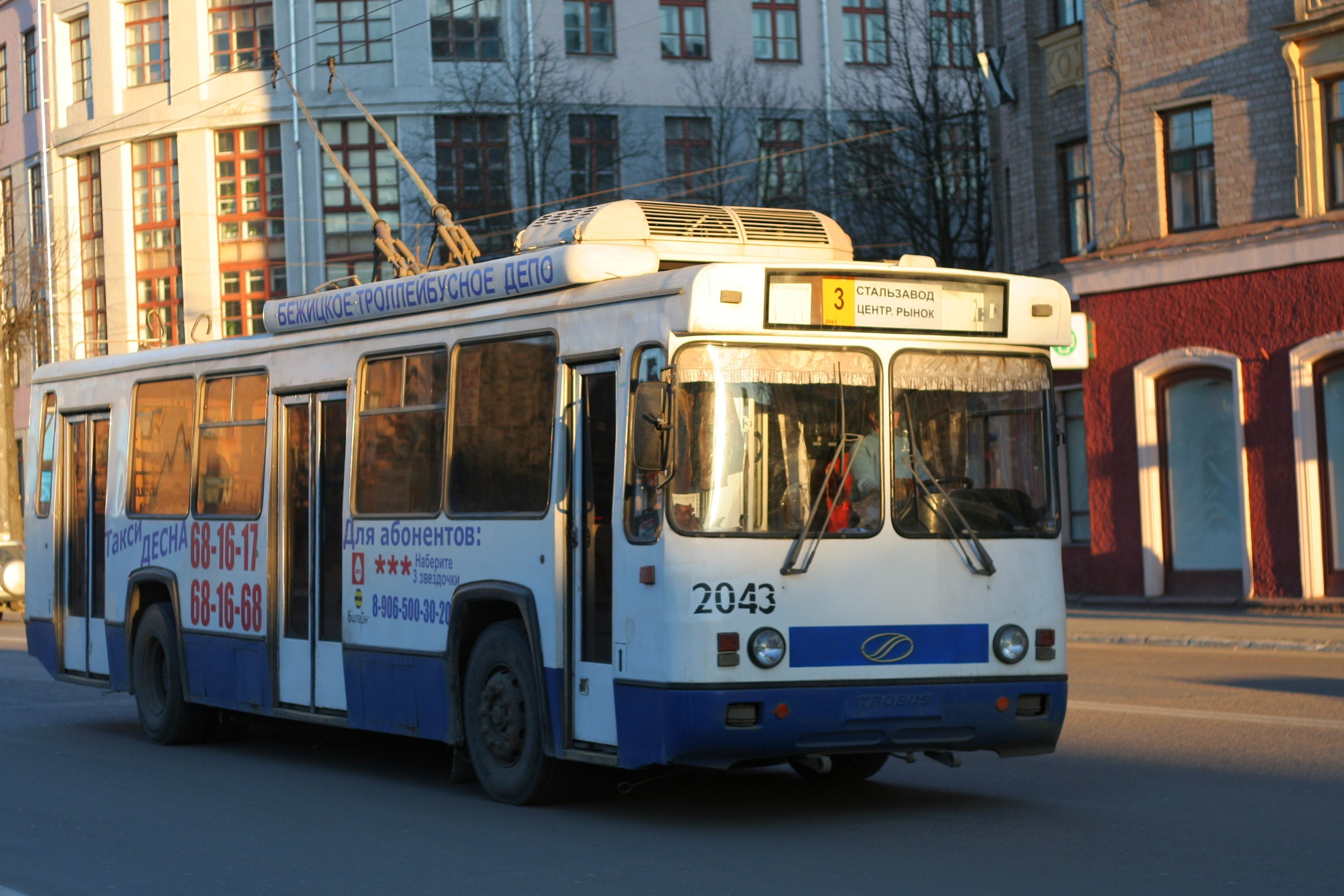
BTZ-5276-04 trolleybus, 2007 (Not used)

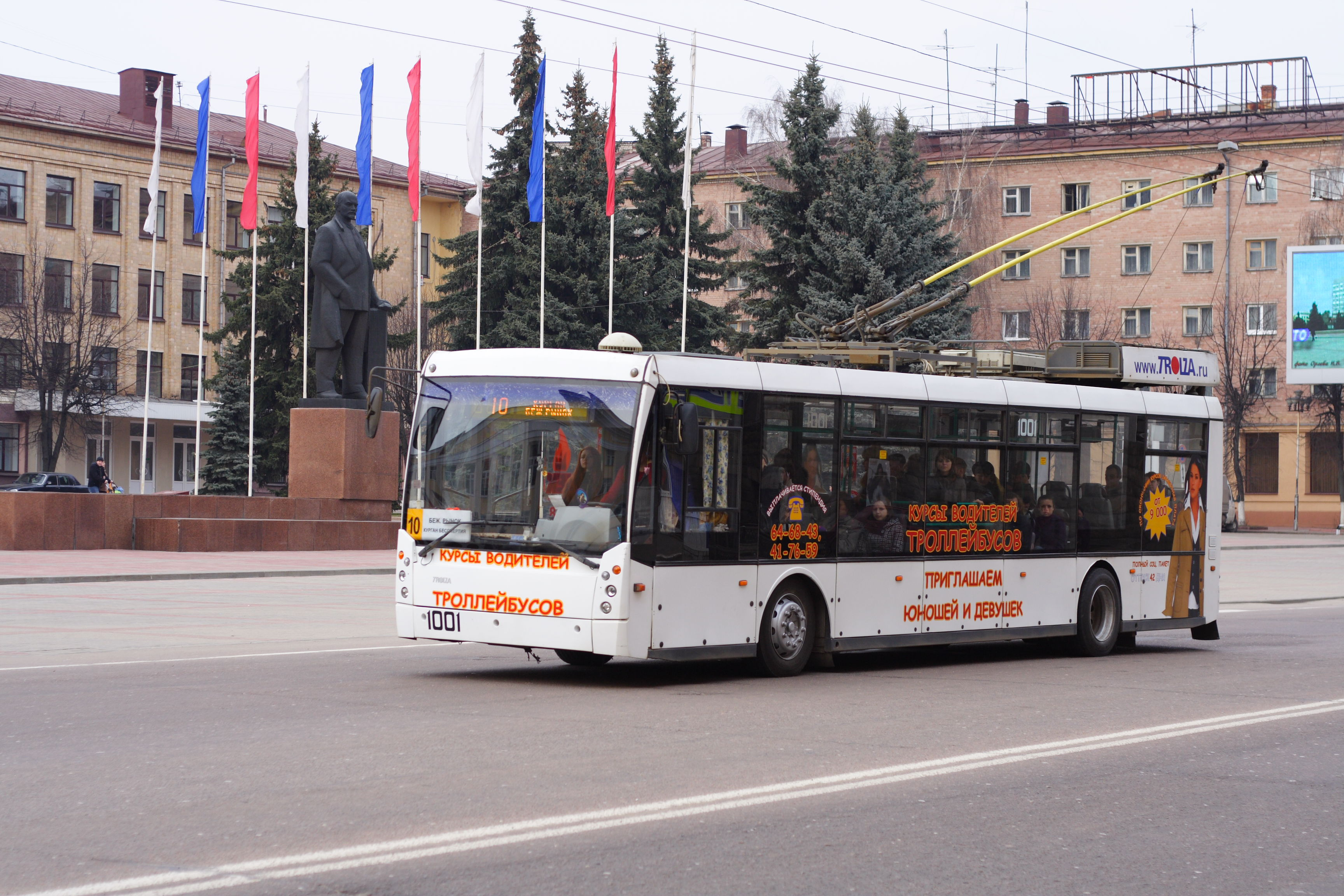
Trolza-5265 low-floor trolleybus, 2014 (Not used)

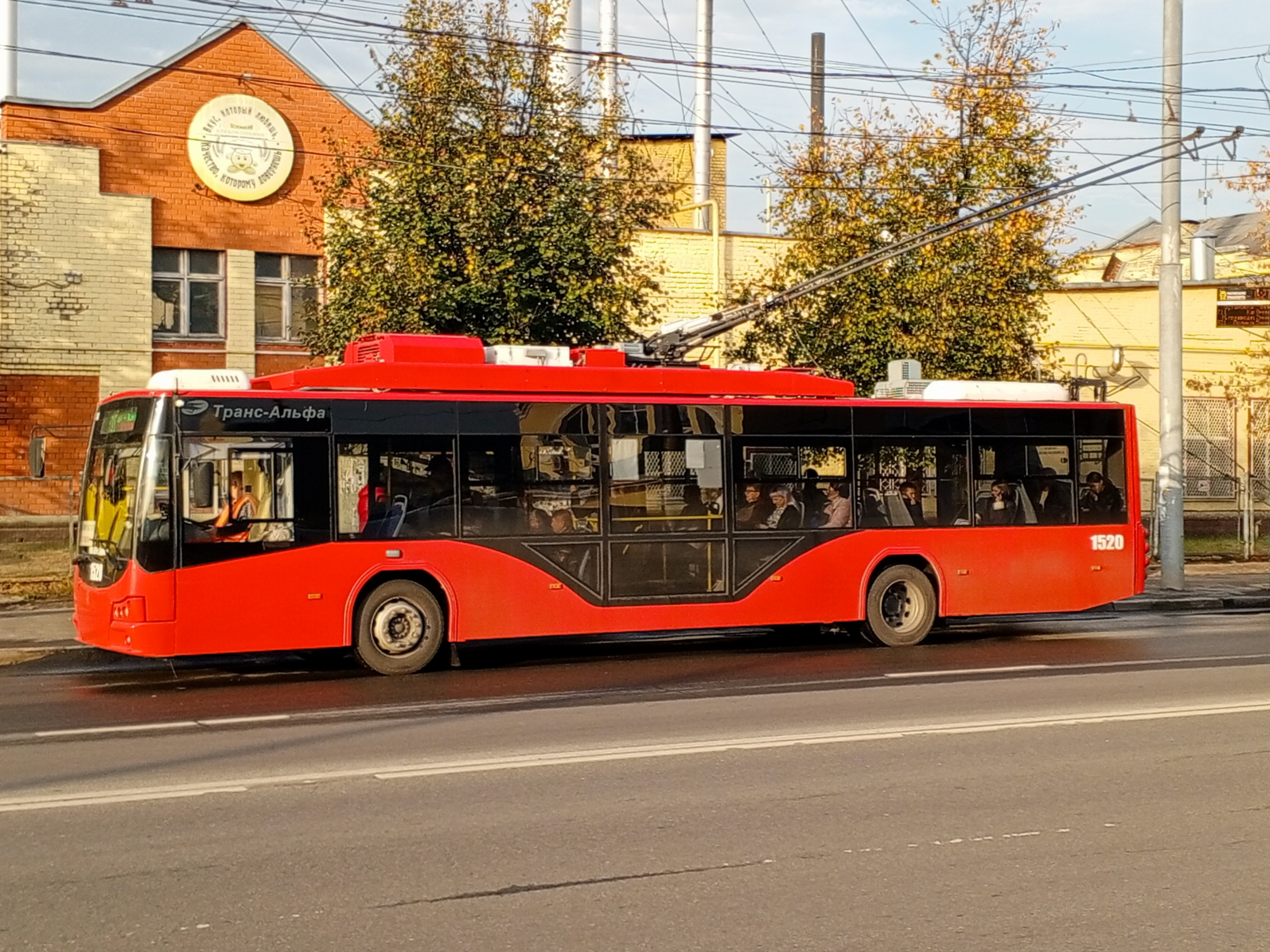
Trolleybus "Avangard" at the Bezhitsa market, route 11T

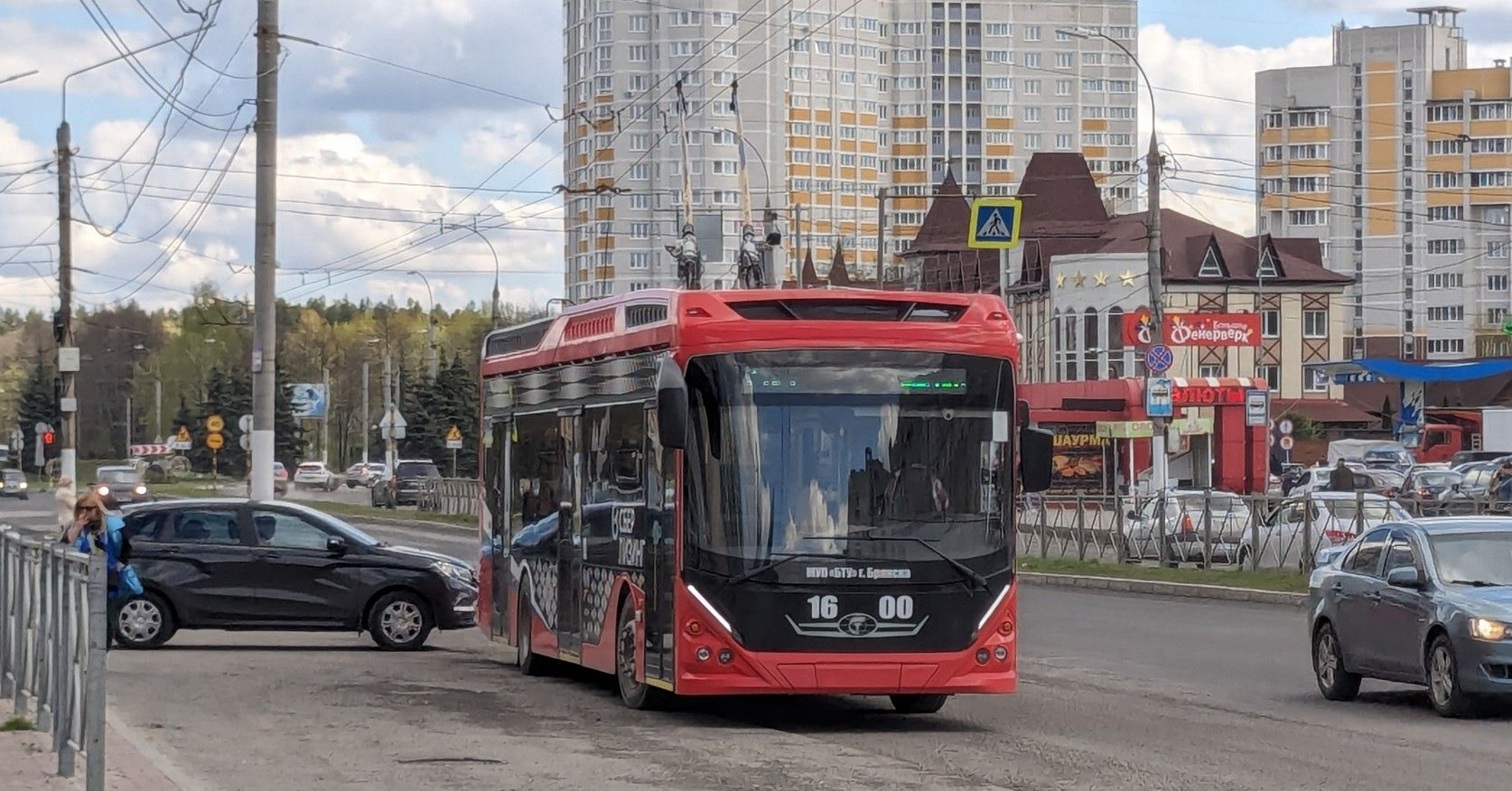
Trolleybus "Admiral" on Moscow avenue, route 8T, 2024

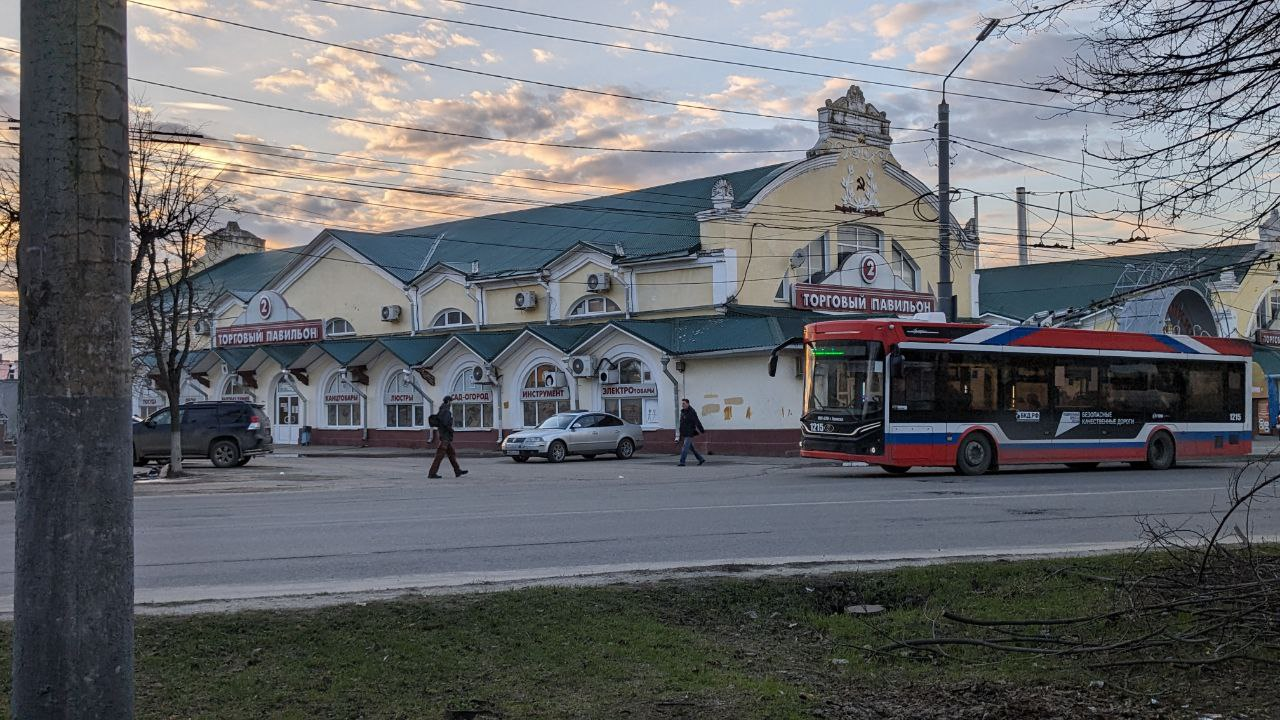
Trolleybus "Admiral" at the pavilions of the Bezhitsa market, route 12T

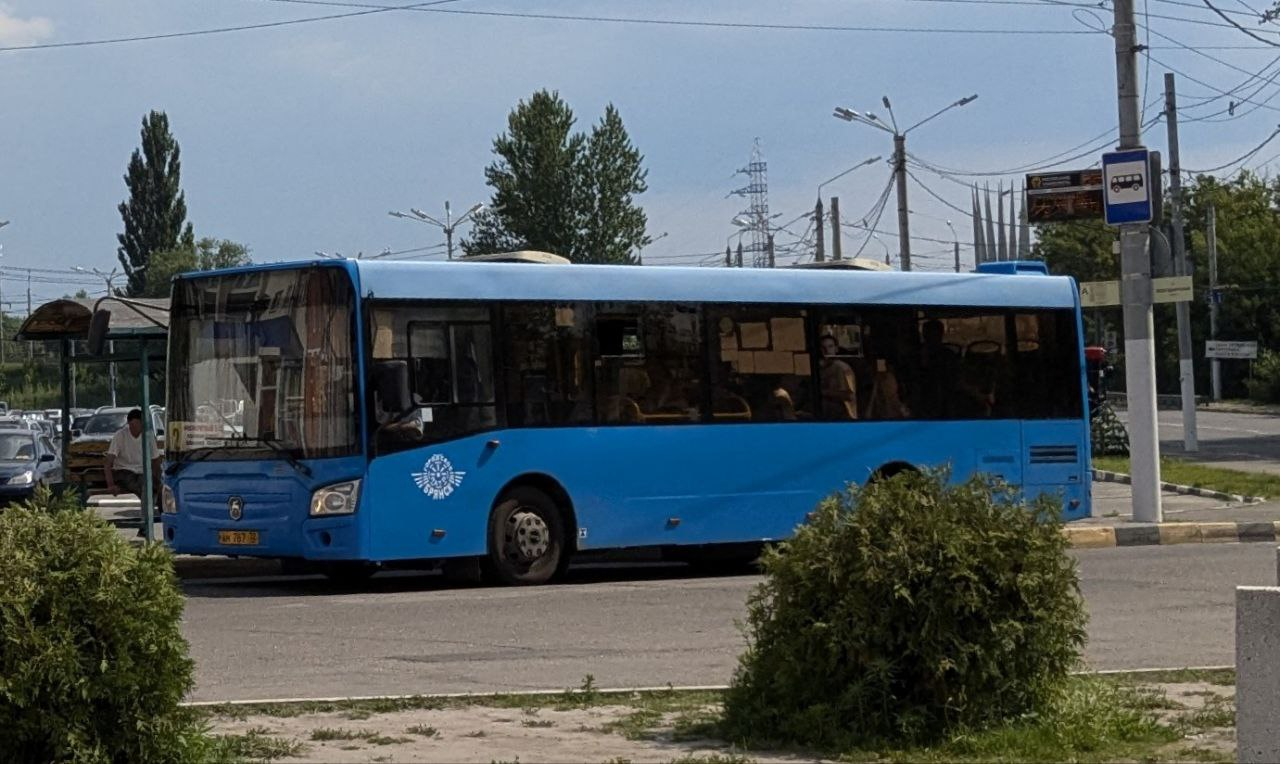
LiAZ-4292 on the Privokzal'naya Square, route 2, 2024

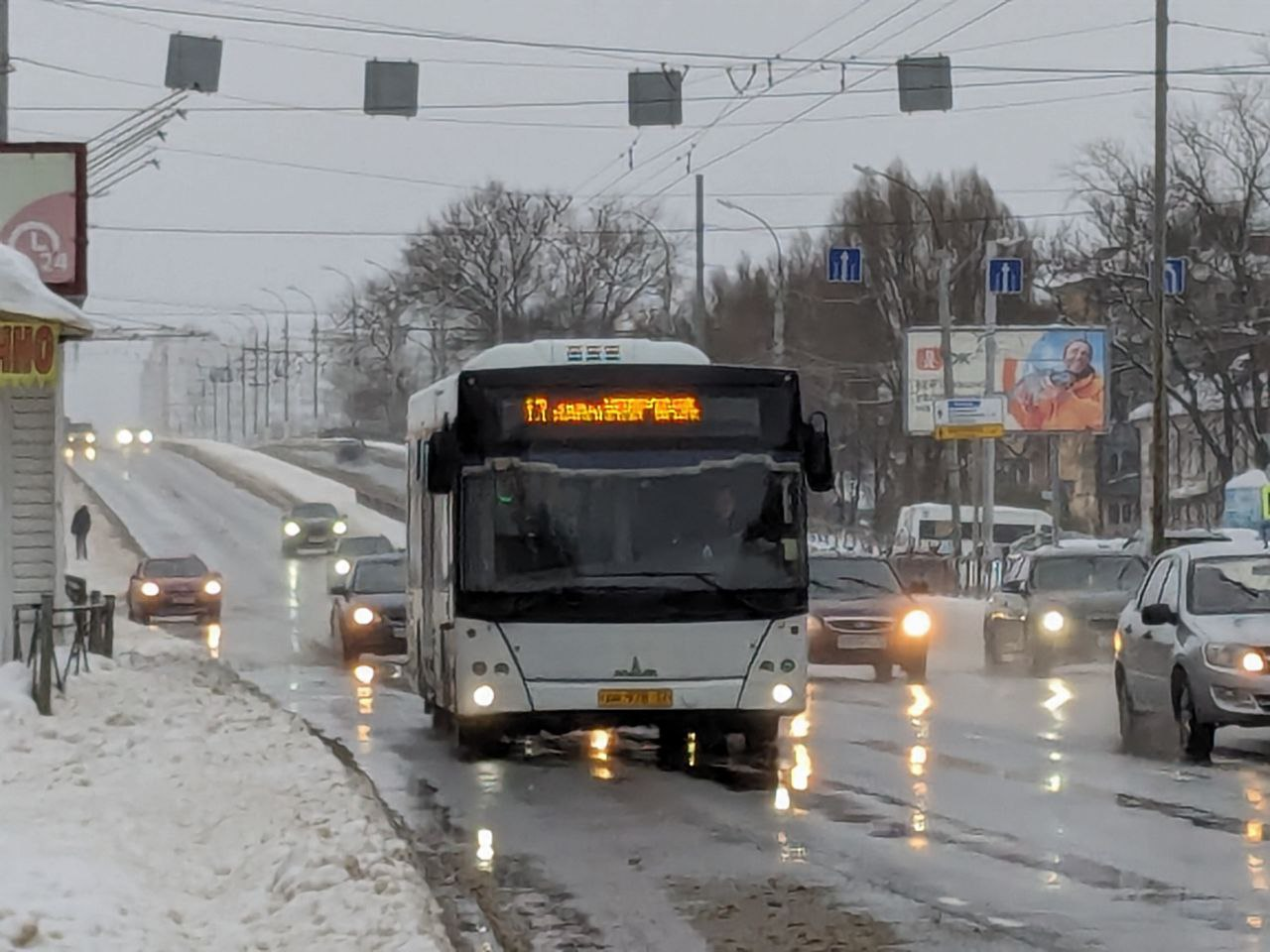
MAZ-206 on the Moscow avenue, route 13, 2023

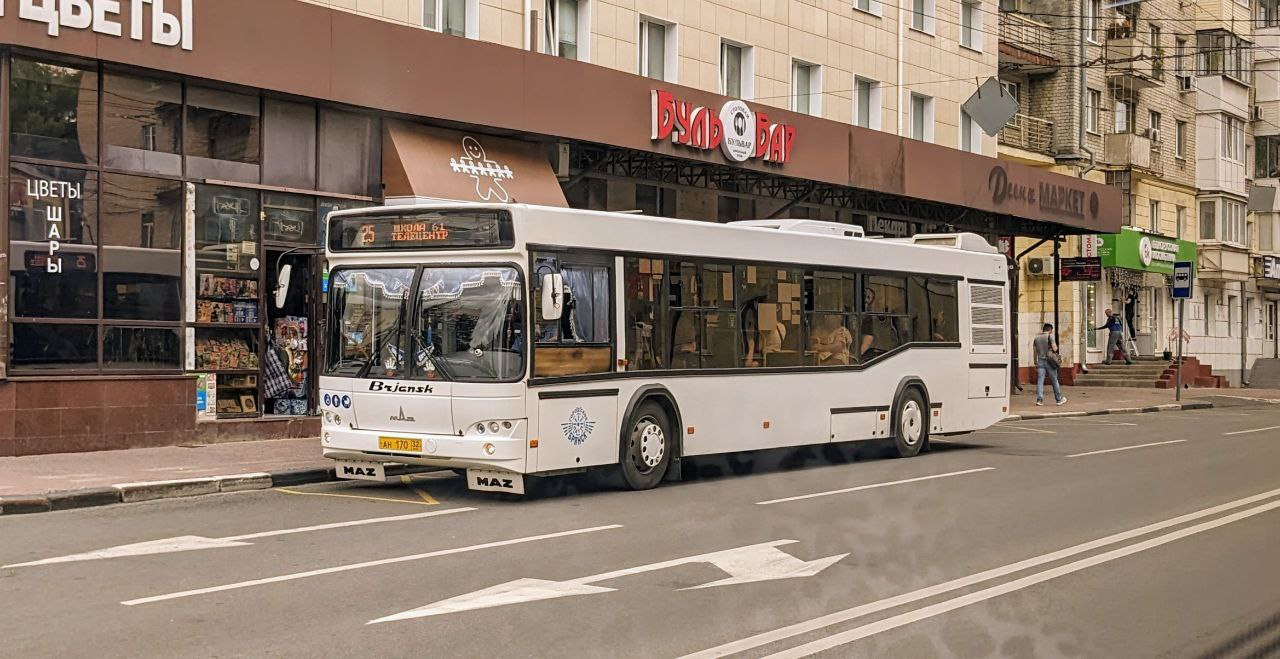
MAZ-103 on the Lenina Avenue, route 25, 2024

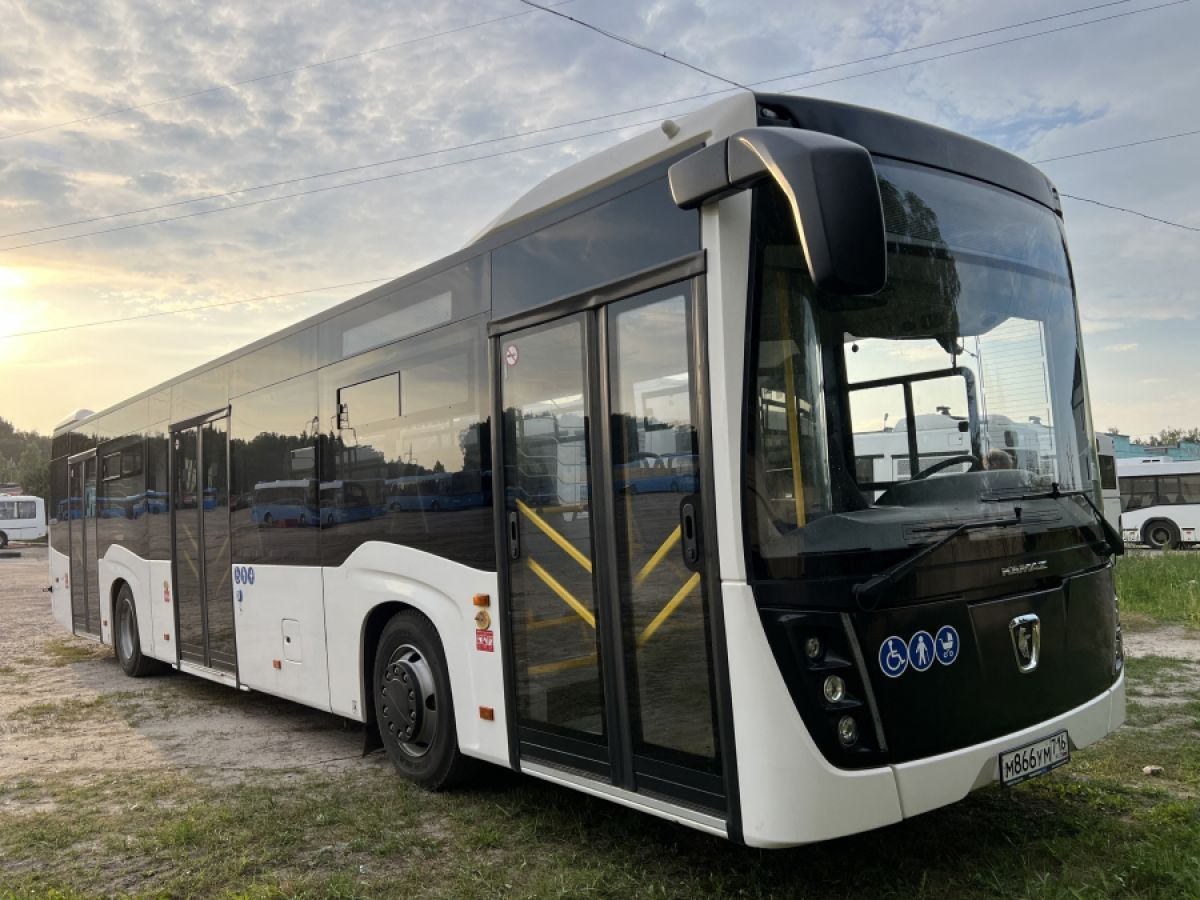
Test НefAZ-5299, 2024

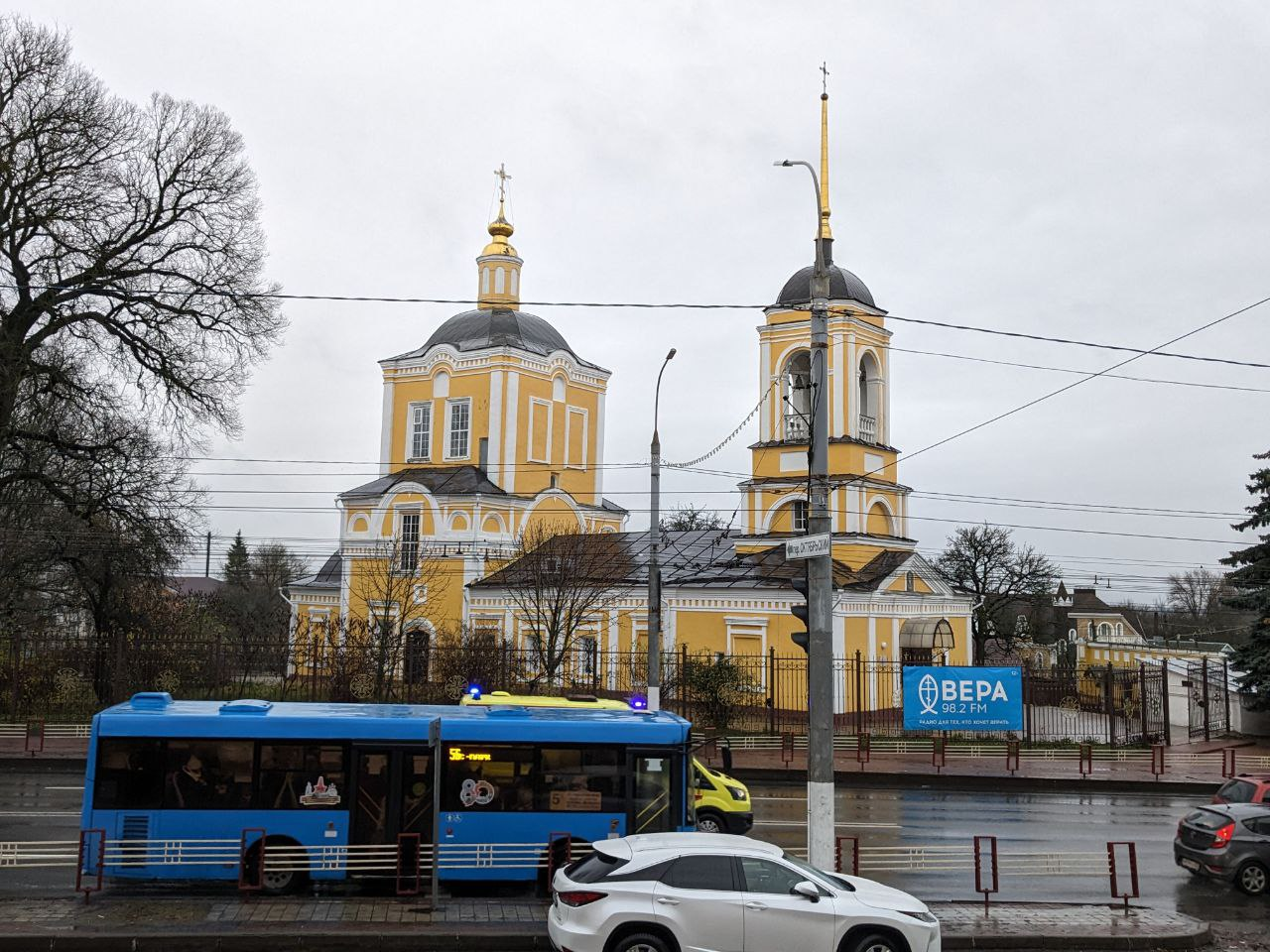
LiAZ 4292 in front of the Ascension Cathedral, route 5b

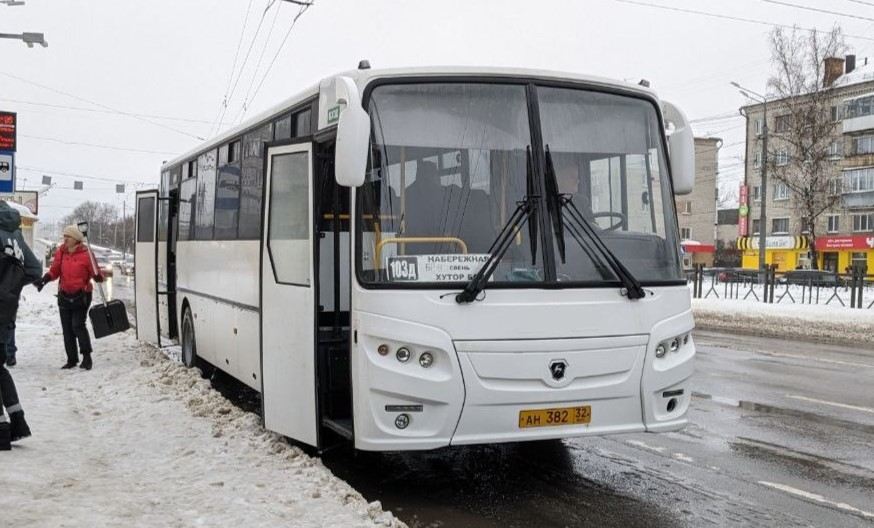
Suburban bus GAZ group "Aurora", route 103D, 2023

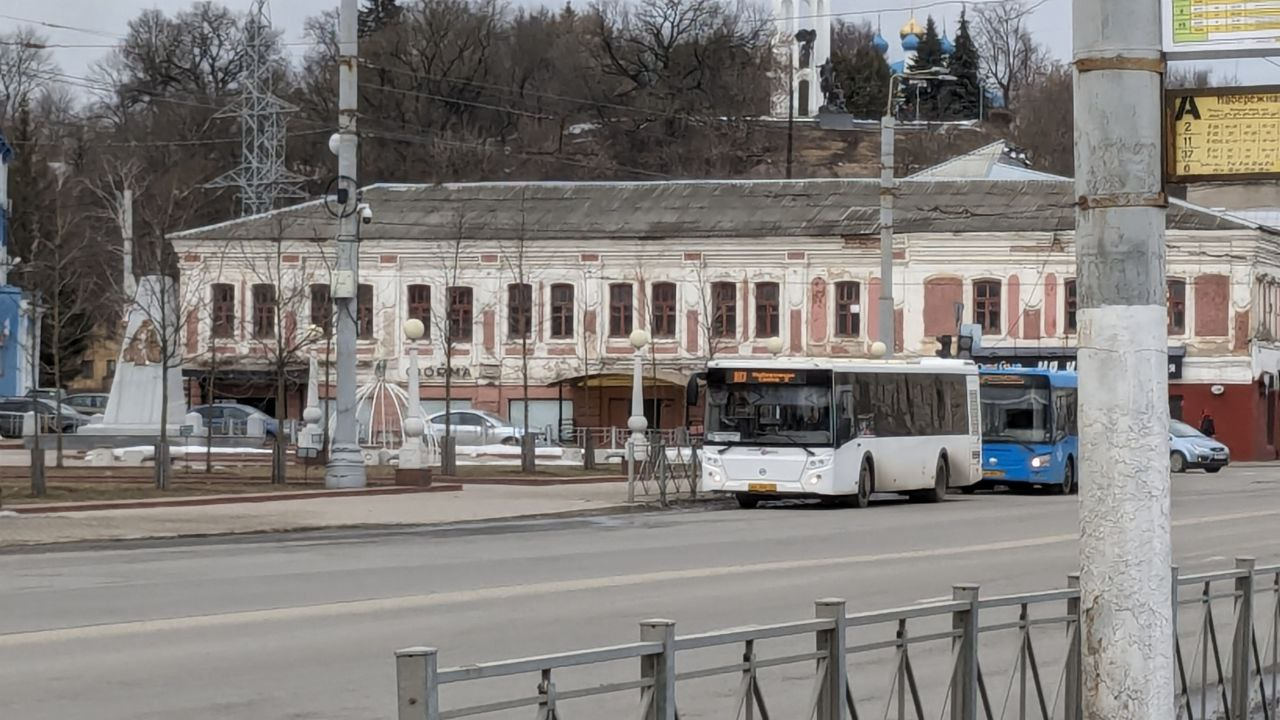
LiAZ-5292 near Semenovsky square on the Big Moscow street, route 103, 2024

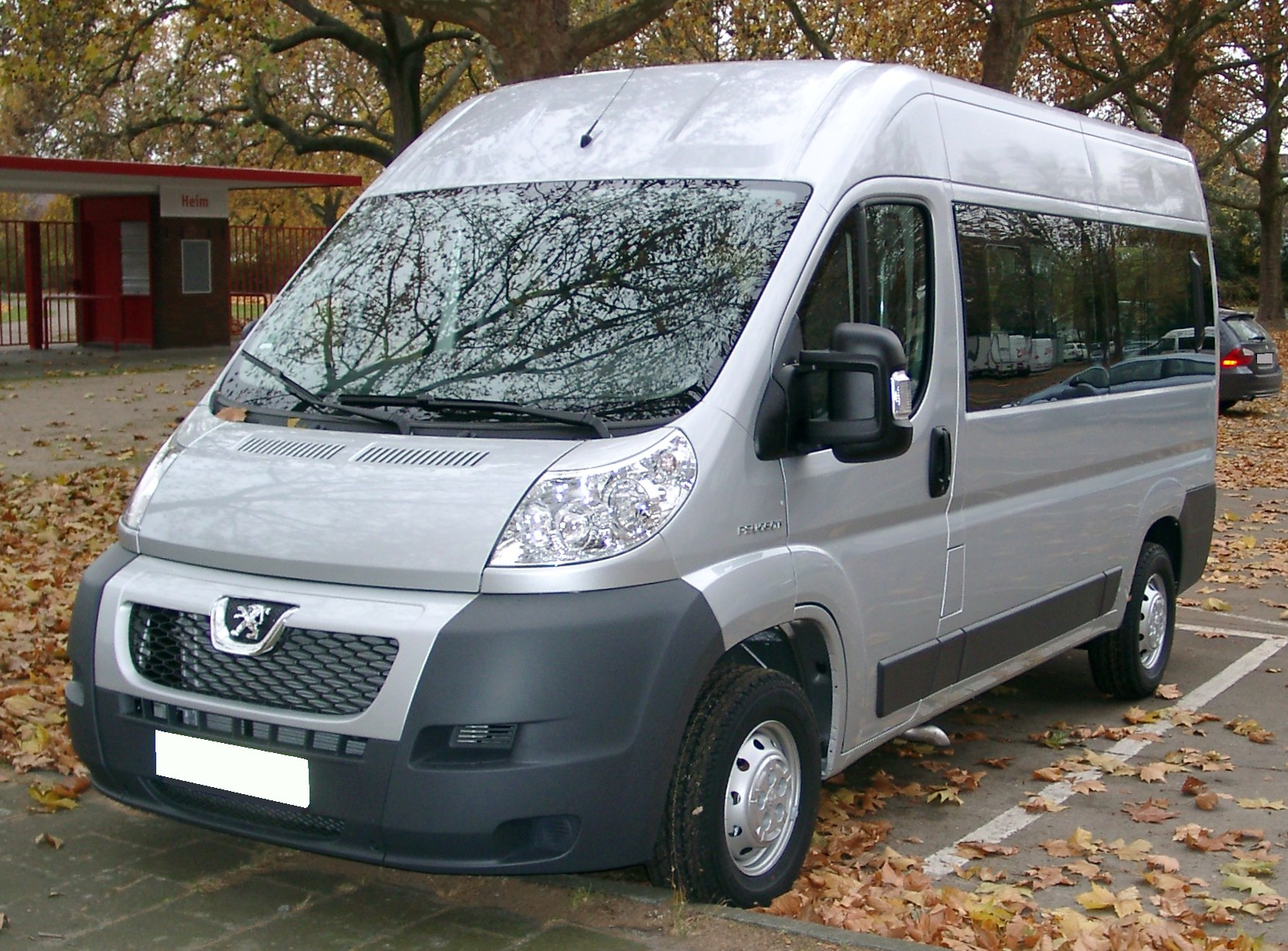
Peugeot Boxer, similar ones are used on commercial transport routes

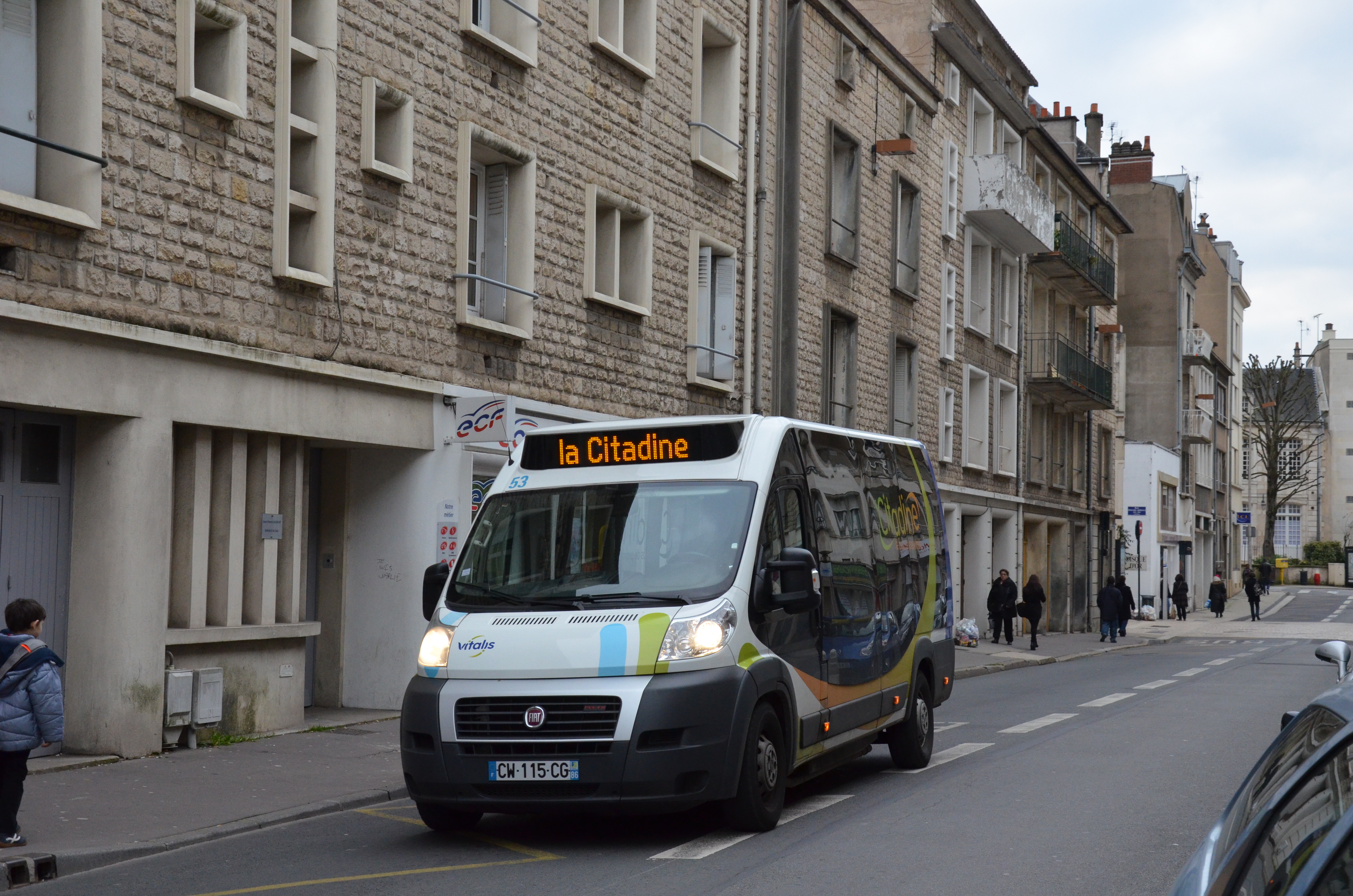
Fiat Ducato, similar ones are used on commercial transport routes

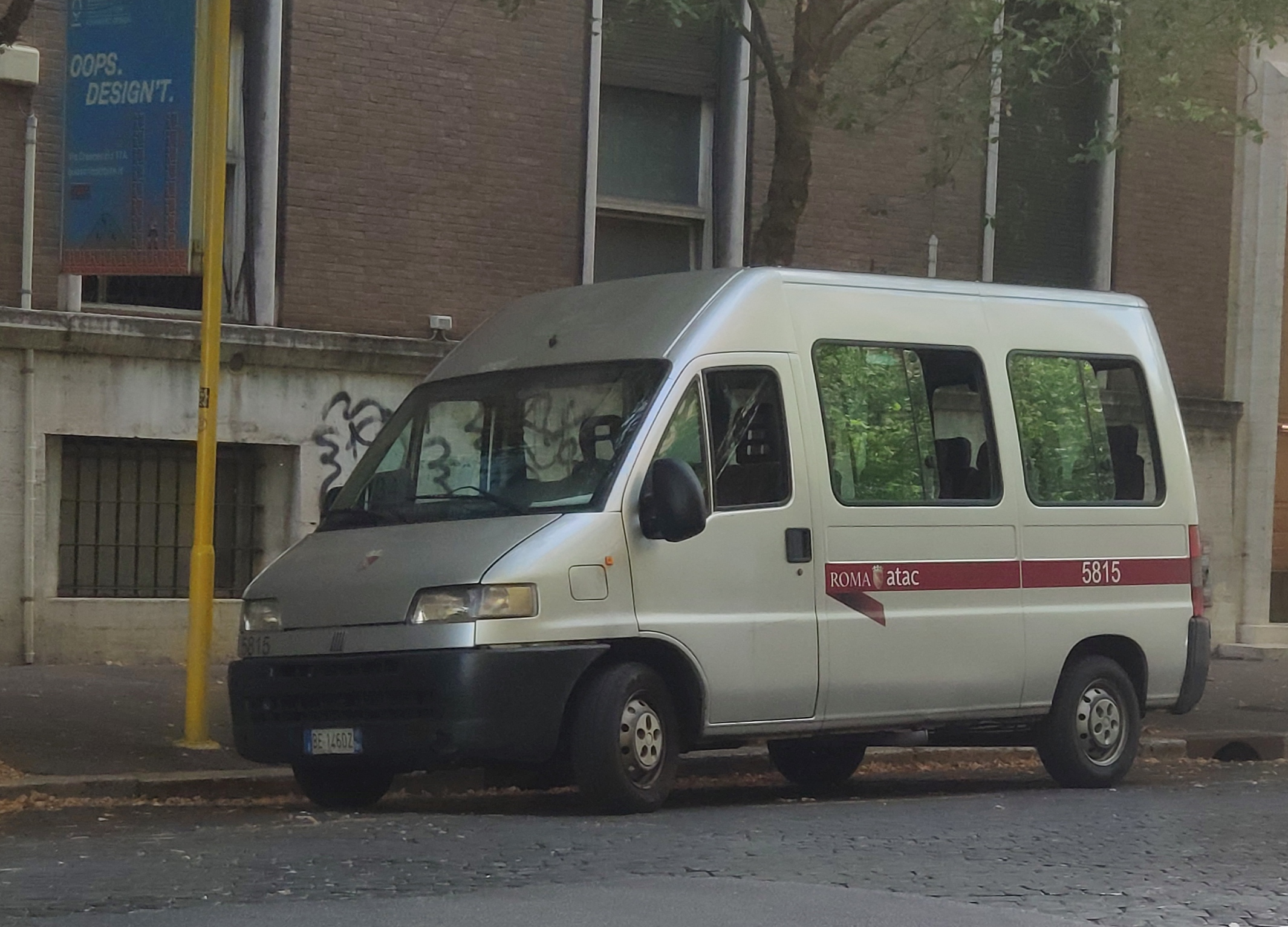
ATAC Fiat Ducato (5815), similar ones are used on commercial transport routes

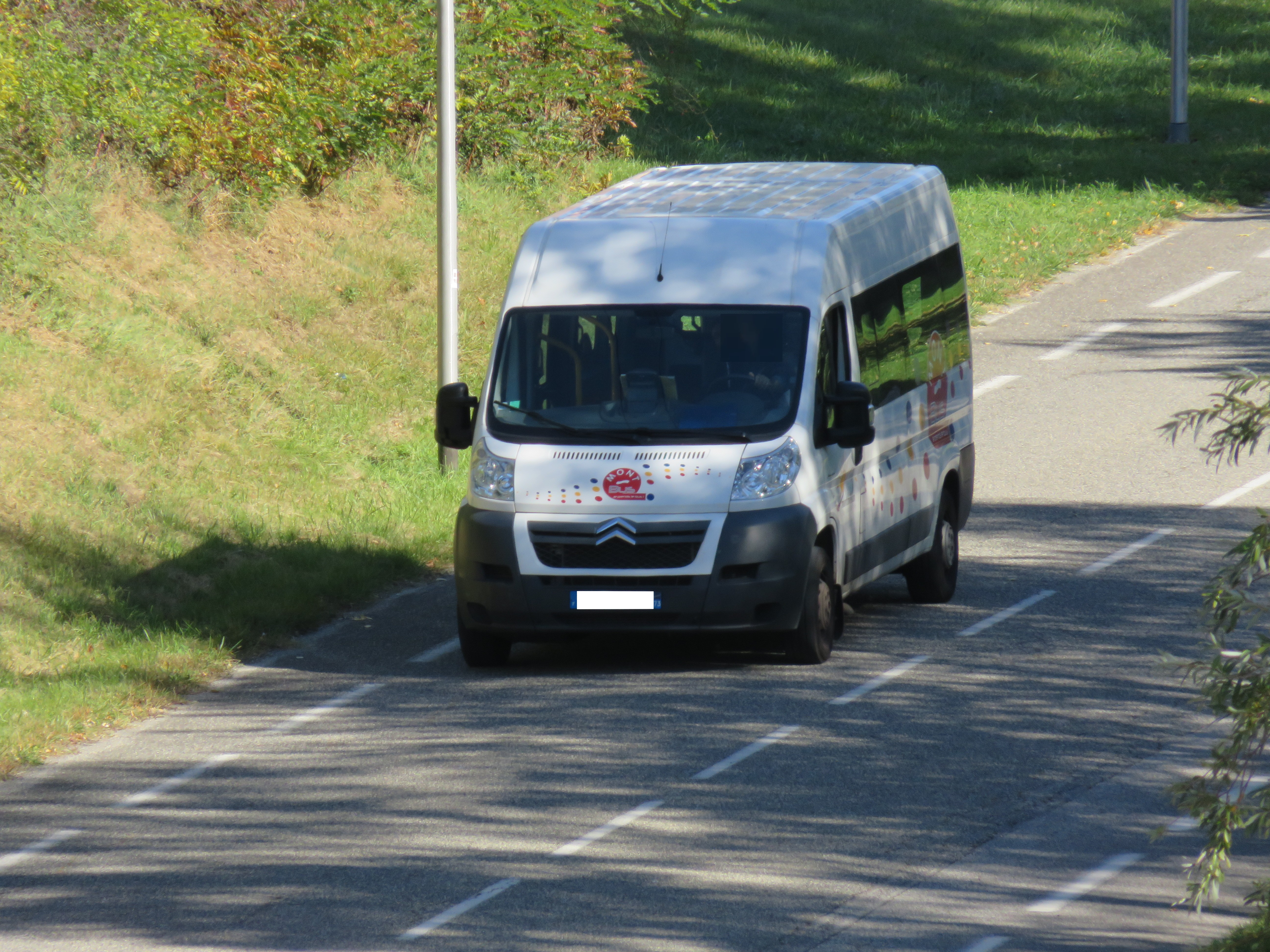
Citroën Jumper, similar ones are used on commercial transport routes and inercity bus routs

== Culture and education ==
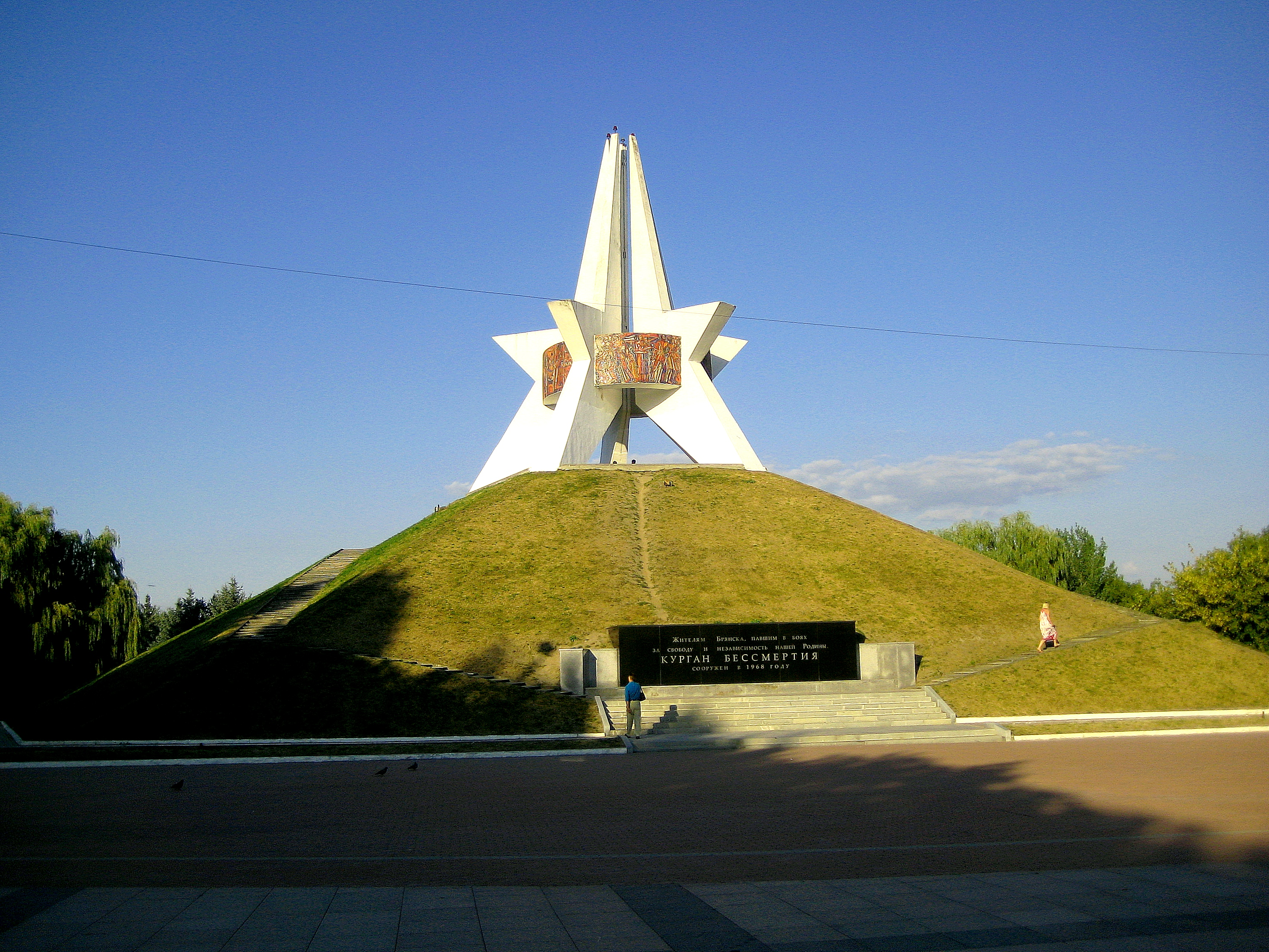
Monument of Kurgan of Immortality

In Bryansk, 69 municipal schools are operating in the 2022/2023 academic year.

There are also 5 universities in the city:

- Bryansk State Technical University;
- Bryansk State University
- Bryansk State Technological University of Engineering
- Bryansk State Agrarian University;
- Bryansk Institute of Management and Business

In addition, in 2024, branches of the following universities operated in Bryansk and the region:

- Emperor Alexander I St. Petersburg State Transport University;
- Bryansk State University named after Academician I. G. Petrovsky (branch in Novozybkov);
- Plekhanov Russian University of Economics;
- Russian Presidential Academy of National Economy and Public Administration;
- Samara State Technical University
- Moscow Financial and Industrial University "Synergy"
- Moscow State University of Technology and Management named after K. G. Razumovsky (First Cossack University) (Unecha)

There are also 12 colleges in the city:

- Bryansk College of Management and Business;
- Bryansk Automobile Transport College;
- Bryansk Basic Medical College;
- Bryansk College of Physical Education;
- Bryansk Cooperative College;
- Bryansk Medical and Social College named after Academician N.M. Amosov;
- Bryansk Regional College of Arts and Culture;
- Bryansk Regional College of Music and Fine Arts;
- Bryansk Professional Pedagogical College;
- Bryansk-City Building College
- Polytechnic College of Bryansk State Technical University;
- College at the Plekhanov Russian University of Economics.

== Sport ==
FC Dynamo Bryansk is football club which competes in Russian Second League.

== Notable people ==
=== Born in Bryansk ===
- The famous poet Fyodor Tyutchev was born in Ovstug family estate, at that time part of the Oryol Governorate, now part of Bryansk Oblast.
- Russian cosmonaut Viktor Afanasyev
- Shot put athlete Svetlana Krivelyova
- Sculptor and architect Naum Gabo
- Classical pianist Valentina Igoshina
- Former Russian professional footballer Roman Lev
- Chess Grandmaster Ian Nepomniachtchi
- Swimmer Victoria Kaminskaya
- MMA fighter Vitaly Minakov
- Former Russian professional footballer Andrei Grechishko
- Singer Maxim Troshin
- Millionaire Mikhail Martynoff

=== Additional ===
- Bulgarian communist leader Stanke Dimitrov (Marek) died in an aviation accident near the city.
- The writer Leonid Dobychin spent most of his adult years there.

== Twin towns – sister cities ==
Bryansk is twinned with:

- Severodvinsk, Russia
- Oryol, Russia
- Omsk, Russia
- Izhevsk, Russia
- Grozny, Russia
- Penza, Russia
- Kaluga, Russia
- Gomel, Belarus
- Mogilev, Belarus
- Minsk, Belarus
- Bogatić, Serbia
- Karlovo, Bulgaria
- Dupnitsa, Bulgaria
- Győr, Hungary
- Akmenė, Lithuania
- Auce, Latvia
- Soroca, Moldova
- Comrat, Moldova
- (Until 2022) Konin, Poland - On March 4, 2022, due to the Russian invasion of Ukraine, Konin tore up the agreement.
- (Until 2022) Chernivtsi, Ukraine

== See also ==
- Lokot Autonomy
