= Mirny, Russia =

Mirny (Russian: Ми́рный; masculine), Mirnaya (Ми́рная; feminine), or Mirnoye (Ми́рное; neuter) is the name of several inhabited localities in Russia.

== Republic of Adygea ==
As of 2010, two rural localities in the Republic of Adygea bear this name:

- Mirny, Krasnogvardeysky District, Republic of Adygea, a settlement in Krasnogvardeysky District
- Mirny, Maykopsky District, Republic of Adygea, a settlement in Maykopsky District

== Altai Krai ==
As of 2010, eight rural localities in Altai Krai bear this name:

- Mirny, Burlinsky District, Altai Krai, a rural locality classified as a crossing loop in Burlinsky Selsoviet of Burlinsky District
- Mirny, Kulundinsky District, Altai Krai, a settlement in Kursky Selsoviet of Kulundinsky District
- Mirny, Loktevsky District, Altai Krai, a settlement in Kirovsky Selsoviet of Loktevsky District
- Mirny, Rodinsky District, Altai Krai, a settlement in Mirnensky Selsoviet of Rodinsky District
- Mirny, Shipunovsky District, Altai Krai, a settlement in Gorkovsky Selsoviet of Shipunovsky District
- Mirny, Uglovsky District, Altai Krai, a settlement in Mirnensky Selsoviet of Uglovsky District
- Mirny, Yegoryevsky District, Altai Krai, a settlement in Pervomaysky Selsoviet of Yegoryevsky District
- Mirny, Zonalny District, Altai Krai, a settlement in Chemrovsky Selsoviet of Zonalny District

== Amur Oblast ==
As of 2010, one rural locality in Amur Oblast bears this name:

- Mirnoye, Amur Oblast, a selo in Prigorodny Rural Settlement of Belogorsky District

== Arkhangelsk Oblast ==
As of 2010, four inhabited localities in Arkhangelsk Oblast bear this name.

Urban localities

- Mirny, Arkhangelsk Oblast, a town; administratively incorporated as a town of oblast significance

Rural localities

- Mirny, Konoshsky District, Arkhangelsk Oblast, a settlement under the administrative jurisdiction of Konosha Urban-Type Settlement with Jurisdictional Territory in Konoshsky District
- Mirny, Nyandomsky District, Arkhangelsk Oblast, a settlement under the administrative jurisdiction of the town of district significance of Nyandoma in Nyandomsky District
- Mirny, Ustyansky District, Arkhangelsk Oblast, a settlement in Likhachevsky Selsoviet of Ustyansky District

== Astrakhan Oblast ==
As of 2010, one rural locality in Astrakhan Oblast bears this name:

- Mirny, Astrakhan Oblast, a settlement in Solyansky Selsoviet of Narimanovsky District

== Republic of Bashkortostan ==
As of 2010, one rural locality in the Republic of Bashkortostan bears this name:

- Mirny, Republic of Bashkortostan, a selo in Mirnovsky Selsoviet of Blagovarsky District

== Belgorod Oblast ==
As of 2010, one rural locality in Belgorod Oblast bears this name:

- Mirny, Belgorod Oblast, a settlement in Krasnogvardeysky District

== Bryansk Oblast ==
As of 2010, four rural localities in Bryansk Oblast bear this name:

- Mirny, Bryansky District, Bryansk Oblast, a settlement in Zhurinichsky Rural Administrative Okrug of Bryansky District
- Mirny, Gordeyevsky District, Bryansk Oblast, a settlement in Gordeyevsky District
- Mirny, Kletnyansky District, Bryansk Oblast, a settlement in Mirninsky Rural Administrative Okrug of Kletnyansky District
- Mirny, Starodubsky District, Bryansk Oblast, a settlement in Mishkovsky Rural Administrative Okrug of Starodubsky District

== Chechen Republic ==
As of 2010, two rural localities in the Chechen Republic bear this name:

- Mirny, Naursky District, Chechen Republic, a khutor in Mekenskaya Rural Administration of Naursky District
- Mirny, Shelkovskoy District, Chechen Republic, a settlement in Sary-Suyskaya Rural Administration of Shelkovskoy District

== Chelyabinsk Oblast ==
As of 2010, six rural localities in Chelyabinsk Oblast bear this name:

- Mirny, Chebarkulsky District, Chelyabinsk Oblast, a settlement in Bishkilsky Selsoviet of Chebarkulsky District
- Mirny, Krasnoarmeysky District, Chelyabinsk Oblast, a settlement in Kozyrevsky Selsoviet of Krasnoarmeysky District
- Mirny, Sosnovsky District, Chelyabinsk Oblast, a settlement in Mirnensky Selsoviet of Sosnovsky District
- Mirny, Uvelsky District, Chelyabinsk Oblast, a settlement in Uvelsky Selsoviet of Uvelsky District
- Mirny, Uysky District, Chelyabinsk Oblast, a settlement in Sokolovsky Selsoviet of Uysky District
- Mirnoye, Chelyabinsk Oblast, a selo in Bredinsky Selsoviet of Bredinsky District

== Chuvash Republic ==
As of 2010, one rural locality in the Chuvash Republic bears this name:

- Mirny, Chuvash Republic, a settlement in Buinskoye Rural Settlement of Ibresinsky District

== Republic of Dagestan ==
As of 2010, one rural locality in the Republic of Dagestan bears this name:

- Mirnoye, Republic of Dagestan, a selo in Kizlyarsky Selsoviet of Kizlyarsky District

== Irkutsk Oblast ==
As of 2010, one rural locality in Irkutsk Oblast bears this name:

- Mirny, Irkutsk Oblast, a selo in Tayshetsky District

== Kaliningrad Oblast ==
As of 2010, one rural locality in Kaliningrad Oblast bears this name:

- Mirny, Kaliningrad Oblast, a settlement in Dobrovolsky Rural Okrug of Krasnoznamensky District

== Republic of Kalmykia ==
As of 2010, one rural locality in the Republic of Kalmykia bears this name:

- Mirny, Republic of Kalmykia, a settlement in Mirnenskaya Rural Administration of Oktyabrsky District

== Kaluga Oblast ==
As of 2010, three rural localities in Kaluga Oblast bear this name:

- Mirny, Kaluga, Kaluga Oblast, a settlement under the administrative jurisdiction of the City of Kaluga
- Mirny, Baryatinsky District, Kaluga Oblast, a settlement in Baryatinsky District
- Mirny, Duminichsky District, Kaluga Oblast, a settlement in Duminichsky District

== Kemerovo Oblast ==
As of 2010, one rural locality in Kemerovo Oblast bears this name:

- Mirny, Kemerovo Oblast, a settlement in Chkalovskaya Rural Territory of Leninsk-Kuznetsky District

== Khabarovsk Krai ==
As of 2010, one rural locality in Khabarovsk Krai bears this name:

- Mirnoye, Khabarovsk Krai, a selo in Khabarovsky District

== Republic of Khakassia ==
As of 2010, one rural locality in the Republic of Khakassia bears this name:

- Mirny, Republic of Khakassia, a selo in Kommunarovsky Selsoviet of Shirinsky District

== Kirov Oblast ==
As of 2010, two inhabited localities in Kirov Oblast bear this name.

Urban localities

- Mirny, Orichevsky District, Kirov Oblast, an urban-type settlement in Orichevsky District

Rural localities

- Mirny, Kilmezsky District, Kirov Oblast, a settlement in Damaskinsky Rural Okrug of Kilmezsky District

== Komi Republic ==
As of 2010, one rural locality in the Komi Republic bears this name:

- Mirny, Komi Republic, a settlement in Mitrofan-Dikost Rural-type Settlement Administrative Territory of Troitsko-Pechorsky District

== Kostroma Oblast ==
As of 2010, one rural locality in Kostroma Oblast bears this name:

- Mirny, Kostroma Oblast, a settlement in Sudislavskoye Settlement of Sudislavsky District

== Krasnodar Krai ==
As of 2010, fifteen rural localities in Krasnodar Krai bear this name:

- Mirny, Goryachy Klyuch, Krasnodar Krai, a settlement in Bezymyanny Rural Okrug under the administrative jurisdiction of the Town of Goryachy Klyuch
- Mirny, Belorechensky District, Krasnodar Krai, a settlement in Druzhnensky Rural Okrug of Belorechensky District
- Mirny, Gulkevichsky District, Krasnodar Krai, a settlement in Kuban Rural Okrug of Gulkevichsky District
- Mirny, Kalininsky District, Krasnodar Krai, a settlement in Kuybyshevsky Rural Okrug of Kalininsky District
- Mirny, Korenovsky District, Krasnodar Krai, a settlement under the administrative jurisdiction of the Town of Korenovsk in Korenovsky District
- Mirny, Krasnoarmeysky District, Krasnodar Krai, a settlement in Oktyabrsky Rural Okrug of Krasnoarmeysky District
- Mirny, Kushchyovsky District, Krasnodar Krai, a settlement in Stepnyansky Rural Okrug of Kushchyovsky District
- Mirny, Labinsky District, Krasnodar Krai, a settlement in Luchevoy Rural Okrug of Labinsky District
- Mirny, Novopokrovsky District, Krasnodar Krai, a settlement in Pokrovsky Rural Okrug of Novopokrovsky District
- Mirny, Seversky District, Krasnodar Krai, a settlement in Smolensky Rural Okrug of Seversky District
- Mirny, Starominsky District, Krasnodar Krai, a khutor in Kuybyshevsky Rural Okrug of Starominsky District
- Mirny, Tbilissky District, Krasnodar Krai, a settlement in Tbilissky Rural Okrug of Tbilissky District
- Mirny, Tikhoretsky District, Krasnodar Krai, a settlement in Bratsky Rural Okrug of Tikhoretsky District
- Mirny, Timashyovsky District, Krasnodar Krai, a khutor in Derbentsky Rural Okrug of Timashyovsky District
- Mirny, Yeysky District, Krasnodar Krai, a settlement in Morevsky Rural Okrug of Yeysky District

== Krasnoyarsk Krai ==
As of 2010, one rural locality in Krasnoyarsk Krai bears this name:

- Mirnoye, Krasnoyarsk Krai, a village in Turukhansky District

== Kursk Oblast ==
As of 2010, one rural locality in Kursk Oblast bears this name:

- Mirny, Kursk Oblast, a settlement in Zamostyansky Selsoviet of Sudzhansky District

== Lipetsk Oblast ==
As of 2010, three rural localities in Lipetsk Oblast bear this name:

- Mirny, Dankovsky District, Lipetsk Oblast, a settlement in Malinkovsky Selsoviet of Dankovsky District
- Mirny, Zadonsky District, Lipetsk Oblast, a settlement in Skornyakovsky Selsoviet of Zadonsky District
- Mirnoye, Lipetsk Oblast, a selo in Kasharsky Selsoviet of Zadonsky District

== Moscow Oblast ==
As of 2010, three rural localities in Moscow Oblast bear this name:

- Mirny, Lyuberetsky District, Moscow Oblast, a settlement under the administrative jurisdiction of the Work Settlement of Tomilino in Lyuberetsky District
- Mirny, Ramensky District, Moscow Oblast, a settlement in Kuznetsovskoye Rural Settlement of Ramensky District
- Mirny, Serpukhovsky District, Moscow Oblast, a settlement in Dashkovskoye Rural Settlement of Serpukhovsky District

== Nizhny Novgorod Oblast ==
As of 2010, three rural localities in Nizhny Novgorod Oblast bear this name:

- Mirny, Bogorodsky District, Nizhny Novgorod Oblast, a settlement in Doskinsky Selsoviet of Bogorodsky District
- Mirny, Varnavinsky District, Nizhny Novgorod Oblast, a settlement in Voskhodovsky Selsoviet of Varnavinsky District
- Mirny, Voskresensky District, Nizhny Novgorod Oblast, a settlement in Glukhovsky Selsoviet of Voskresensky District

== Republic of North Ossetia–Alania ==
As of 2010, one rural locality in the Republic of North Ossetia–Alania bears this name:

- Mirny, Republic of North Ossetia–Alania, a settlement in Vinogradnensky Rural Okrug of Mozdoksky District

== Novgorod Oblast ==
As of 2010, two rural localities in Novgorod Oblast bear this name:

- Mirny, Novgorod Oblast, a settlement in Morkhovskoye Settlement of Kholmsky District
- Mirnaya, Novgorod Oblast, a village in Vybitskoye Settlement of Soletsky District

== Novosibirsk Oblast ==
As of 2010, four rural localities in Novosibirsk Oblast bear this name:

- Mirny, Kochenyovsky District, Novosibirsk Oblast, a settlement in Kochenyovsky District
- Mirny, Kuybyshevsky District, Novosibirsk Oblast, a settlement in Kuybyshevsky District
- Mirny, Toguchinsky District, Novosibirsk Oblast, a settlement in Toguchinsky District
- Mirny, Ust-Tarksky District, Novosibirsk Oblast, a settlement in Ust-Tarksky District

== Orenburg Oblast ==
As of 2010, two rural localities in Orenburg Oblast bear this name:

- Mirny, Orsk, Orenburg Oblast, a settlement in Mirny Selsoviet of the city of Orsk
- Mirny, Alexandrovsky District, Orenburg Oblast, a settlement in Khortitsky Selsoviet of Alexandrovsky District

== Oryol Oblast ==
As of 2010, two rural localities in Oryol Oblast bear this name:

- Mirny, Kromskoy District, Oryol Oblast, a settlement in Koroskovsky Selsoviet of Kromskoy District
- Mirny, Soskovsky District, Oryol Oblast, a settlement in Lobyntsevsky Selsoviet of Soskovsky District

== Penza Oblast ==
As of 2010, one rural locality in Penza Oblast bears this name:

- Mirny, Penza Oblast, a settlement in Yurovsky Selsoviet of Mokshansky District

== Primorsky Krai ==
As of 2010, one rural locality in Primorsky Krai bears this name:

- Mirny, Primorsky Krai, a settlement in Nadezhdinsky District

== Pskov Oblast ==
As of 2010, one rural locality in Pskov Oblast bears this name:

- Mirny, Pskov Oblast, a village in Pytalovsky District

== Rostov Oblast ==
As of 2010, two rural localities in Rostov Oblast bear this name:

- Mirny, Dubovsky District, Rostov Oblast, a khutor in Mirnenskoye Rural Settlement of Dubovsky District
- Mirny, Yegorlyksky District, Rostov Oblast, a khutor in Balko-Gruzskoye Rural Settlement of Yegorlyksky District

== Ryazan Oblast ==
As of 2010, one rural locality in Ryazan Oblast bears this name:

- Mirny, Ryazan Oblast, a settlement in Borshevsky Rural Okrug of Miloslavsky District

== Sakha Republic ==
As of 2010, one urban locality in the Sakha Republic bears this name:

- Mirny, Sakha Republic, a town under republic jurisdiction in Mirninsky District

== Samara Oblast ==
As of 2010, one urban locality in Samara Oblast bears this name:

- Mirny, Samara Oblast, an urban-type settlement in Krasnoyarsky District

== Saratov Oblast ==
As of 2010, seven rural localities in Saratov Oblast bear this name:

- Mirny, Dergachyovsky District, Saratov Oblast, a settlement in Dergachyovsky District
- Mirny, Ivanteyevsky District, Saratov Oblast, a settlement in Ivanteyevsky District
- Mirny, Novouzensky District, Saratov Oblast, a settlement in Novouzensky District
- Mirny, Petrovsky District, Saratov Oblast, a settlement in Petrovsky District
- Mirny, Yekaterinovsky District, Saratov Oblast, a settlement in Yekaterinovsky District
- Mirny, Yershovsky District, Saratov Oblast, a settlement in Yershovsky District
- Mirnoye, Saratov Oblast, a selo in Rovensky District

== Stavropol Krai ==
As of 2010, four rural localities in Stavropol Krai bear this name:

- Mirny, Kursky District, Stavropol Krai, a settlement in Mirnensky Selsoviet of Kursky District
- Mirny, Mineralovodsky District, Stavropol Krai, a settlement in Prikumsky Selsoviet of Mineralovodsky District
- Mirny, Predgorny District, Stavropol Krai, a settlement in Predgorny District
- Mirnoye, Stavropol Krai, a selo in Blagodarnensky District

== Sverdlovsk Oblast ==
As of 2010, one rural locality in Sverdlovsk Oblast bears this name:

- Mirny, Sverdlovsk Oblast, a settlement under the administrative jurisdiction of the Town of Serov

== Tambov Oblast ==
As of 2010, two rural localities in Tambov Oblast bear this name:

- Mirny, Kirsanovsky District, Tambov Oblast, a settlement in Kovylsky Selsoviet of Kirsanovsky District
- Mirny, Tambovsky District, Tambov Oblast, a settlement in Donskoy Selsoviet of Tambovsky District

== Tomsk Oblast ==
As of 2010, one rural locality in Tomsk Oblast bears this name:

- Mirny, Tomsk Oblast, a settlement in Tomsky District

== Tula Oblast ==
As of 2010, two rural localities in Tula Oblast bear this name:

- Mirny, Novomoskovsky District, Tula Oblast, a settlement under the administrative jurisdiction of Novomoskovsk City Under District Jurisdiction in Novomoskovsky District
- Mirny, Yefremovsky District, Tula Oblast, a settlement in Tormasovsky Rural Okrug of Yefremovsky District

== Tver Oblast ==
As of 2010, six rural localities in Tver Oblast bear this name:

- Mirny, Konakovsky District, Tver Oblast, a settlement under the administrative jurisdiction of Novozavidovsky Urban Settlement in Konakovsky District
- Mirny, Likhoslavlsky District, Tver Oblast, a settlement in Tolmachevskoye Rural Settlement of Likhoslavlsky District
- Mirny, Nelidovsky District, Tver Oblast, a settlement in Zemtsovskoye Rural Settlement of Nelidovsky District
- Mirny, Oleninsky District, Tver Oblast, a settlement in Mostovskoye Rural Settlement of Oleninsky District
- Mirny, Torzhoksky District, Tver Oblast, a settlement in Mirnovskoye Rural Settlement of Torzhoksky District
- Mirnaya, Tver Oblast, a village in Yemelyanovskoye Rural Settlement of Staritsky District

== Tyumen Oblast ==
As of 2010, two rural localities in Tyumen Oblast bear this name:

- Mirny, Abatsky District, Tyumen Oblast, a settlement in Leninsky Rural Okrug of Abatsky District
- Mirny, Vagaysky District, Tyumen Oblast, a settlement in Pervovagaysky Rural Okrug of Vagaysky District

== Udmurt Republic ==
As of 2010, one rural locality in the Udmurt Republic bears this name:

- Mirny, Udmurt Republic, a pochinok in Yagulsky Selsoviet of Zavyalovsky District

== Ulyanovsk Oblast ==
As of 2010, one rural locality in Ulyanovsk Oblast bears this name:

- Mirny, Ulyanovsk Oblast, a settlement in Mirnovsky Rural Okrug of Cherdaklinsky District

== Vladimir Oblast ==
As of 2010, one rural locality in Vladimir Oblast bears this name:

- Mirny, Vladimir Oblast, a settlement in Kameshkovsky District

== Volgograd Oblast ==
As of 2010, three rural localities in Volgograd Oblast bear this name:

- Mirny, Nekhayevsky District, Volgograd Oblast, a settlement in Dinamovsky Selsoviet of Nekhayevsky District
- Mirny, Novonikolayevsky District, Volgograd Oblast, a settlement in Mirny Selsoviet of Novonikolayevsky District
- Mirny, Zhirnovsky District, Volgograd Oblast, a settlement in Novinsky Selsoviet of Zhirnovsky District

== Vologda Oblast ==
As of 2010, two rural localities in Vologda Oblast bear this name:

- Mirny, Syamzhensky District, Vologda Oblast, a settlement in Dvinitsky Selsoviet of Syamzhensky District
- Mirny, Vytegorsky District, Vologda Oblast, a settlement in Kemsky Selsoviet of Vytegorsky District

== Voronezh Oblast ==
As of 2010, one rural locality in Voronezh Oblast bears this name:

- Mirny, Voronezh Oblast, a settlement in Verkhnebykovskoye Rural Settlement of Vorobyovsky District

== Yaroslavl Oblast ==
As of 2010, one rural locality in Yaroslavl Oblast bears this name:

- Mirnaya, Yaroslavl Oblast, a village in Novinsky Rural Okrug of Nekouzsky District

== Zabaykalsky Krai ==
As of 2010, one rural locality in Zabaykalsky Krai bears this name:

- Mirnaya, Zabaykalsky Krai, a settlement at the station in Olovyanninsky District
