= Shadrukha =

Shadrukha Шадруха
- Village
- Location within Altai Krai Location within Russia
- Coordinates: 51°09′N 79°57′E
- Country: Russia
- Region: Altai Krai
- District: Uglovsky District
- Time zone: UTC+7:00

Shadrukha (Russian: Шадруха) is a rural locality (a selo) and the administrative center of Shadrukhinsky Selsoviet of Uglovsky District, Altai Krai, Russia. The population was 525 in 2016. It was founded in 1882. There are 6 streets.

== Geography ==
Shadrukha is located 32 km southwest of Uglovskoye (the district's administrative centre) by road. Lyapunovo is the nearest rural locality.
