= Topolinsky Leskhoz =

Topolinsky Leskhoz Тополинский Лесхоз
- Settlement
- Location within Altai Krai Location within Russia
- Coordinates: 50°56′N 80°04′E
- Country: Russia
- Region: Altai Krai
- District: Uglovsky District
- Time zone: UTC+7:00

Topolinsky Leskhoz (Russian: Тополинский Лесхоз) is a rural locality (a settlement) in Topolinsky Selsoviet, Uglovsky District, Altai Krai, Russia. The population was 196 as of 2013. There is 1 street.

== Geography ==
Topolinsky Leskhoz is located 72 km south of Uglovskoye (the district's administrative centre) by road. Topolnoye is the nearest rural locality.
