= Laptev Log =

Laptev Log Лаптев Лог
- Selo
- Location within Altai Krai Location within Russia
- Coordinates: 51°03′N 80°11′E
- Country: Russia
- Region: Altai Krai
- District: Uglovsky District
- Time zone: UTC+7:00

Laptev Log (Russian: Лаптев Лог) is a rural locality (a selo) and the administrative center of Laptevsky Selsoviet, Uglovsky District, Altai Krai, Russia. The population was 756 as of 2013. It was founded in 1888. There are 6 streets.

== Geography ==
Laptev Log is located 56 km south of Uglovskoye (the district's administrative centre) by road. Borisovka is the nearest rural locality.
