= Kuybyshevo =

Kuybyshevo may refer to:

- Kuybyshevo, Russia, several rural localities in Russia
- Kuybyshevo, an alternative name of Zhyngyldy, a town in Mangystau Region, Kazakhstan
- Kuibysheve (Kuybyshevo), several inhabited localities in Ukraine
