= Chernokorovnikovo =

Chernokorovnikovo Чернокоровниково
- Selo
- Location within Altai Krai Location within Russia
- Coordinates: 51°37′N 80°28′E
- Country: Russia
- Region: Altai Krai
- District: Uglovsky District
- Time zone: UTC+7:00

Chernokorovnikovo (Russian: Чернокоровниково) is a rural locality (a selo) in Simonovsky Selsoviet, Uglovsky District, Altai Krai, Russia. The population was 10 as of 2013. It was founded in 1893. There are 2 streets.

== Geography ==
Chernokorovnikovo is located 37 km northeast of Uglovskoye (the district's administrative centre) by road. Simonovo is the nearest rural locality.
