= Novouglovsky =

Novouglovsky Новоугловский
- Settlement
- Location within Altai Krai Location within Russia
- Coordinates: 51°26′N 80°17′E
- Country: Russia
- Region: Altai Krai
- District: Uglovsky District
- Time zone: UTC+7:00

Novouglovsky (Russian: Новоугловский) is a rural locality (a settlement) in Uglovsky Selsoviet, Uglovsky District, Altai Krai, Russia. The population was 278 as of 2013. There are 2 streets.

== Geography ==
Novouglovsky is located 13 km north of Uglovskoye (the district's administrative centre) by road. Ozyorno-Kuznetsovo is the nearest rural locality.
