= Kormikha =

Kormikha Кормиха
- Selo
- Location within Altai Krai Location within Russia
- Coordinates: 51°41′N 80°32′E
- Country: Russia
- Region: Altai Krai
- District: Uglovsky District
- Time zone: UTC+7:00

Kormikha (Russian: Кормиха) is a rural locality (a selo) in Simonovsky Selsoviet, Uglovsky District, Altai Krai, Russia. The population was 59 as of 2013. It was founded in 1840. There is 1 street.

== Geography ==
Kormikha is located 48 km north of Uglovskoye (the district's administrative centre) by road. Chernokorovnikovo is the nearest rural locality.
