= Simonovo =

Simonovo Симоново
- Selo
- Location within Altai Krai Location within Russia
- Coordinates: 51°41′N 80°22′E
- Country: Russia
- Region: Altai Krai
- District: Uglovsky District
- Time zone: UTC+7:00

Simonovo (Russian: Симоново) is a rural locality (a selo) and the administrative center of Simonovsky Selsoviet, Uglovsky District, Altai Krai, Russia. The population was 634 as of 2013. It was founded in 1901. There are 6 streets.

== Geography ==
Simonovo is located 49 km north of Uglovskoye (the district's administrative centre) by road. Chernokorovnikovo is the nearest rural locality.
