= Uglovsky =

Uglovsky (masculine), Uglovskaya (feminine), or Uglovskoye (neuter) may refer to:

- Uglovsky District, name of several districts in Russia
- Uglovskoye, a rural locality (a selo) in Uglovsky District of Altai Krai, Russia
