= Bor-Kosobulat =

Bor-Kosobulat Бор-Кособулат
- Selo
- Location within Altai Krai Location within Russia
- Coordinates: 51°24′N 79°49′E
- Country: Russia
- Region: Altai Krai
- District: Uglovsky District
- Time zone: UTC+7:00

Bor-Kosobulat (Russian: Бор-Кособулат) is a rural locality (a selo) in Shadrukhinsky Selsoviet, Uglovsky District, Altai Krai, Russia. The population was 87 as of 2013. It was founded in 1884. There are 2 streets.

== Geography ==
Bor-Kosobulat is located 31 km northwest of Uglovskoye (the district's administrative centre) by road. Pavlovka is the nearest rural locality.
