= Ozyorno-Kuznetsovo =

Ozyorno-Kuznetsovo Озёрно-Кузнецово
- Selo
- Location within Altai Krai Location within Russia
- Coordinates: 51°30′N 80°21′E
- Country: Russia
- Region: Altai Krai
- District: Uglovsky District
- Time zone: UTC+7:00

Ozyorno-Kuznetsovo (Russian: Озёрно-Кузнецово) is a rural locality (a selo) and the administrative center of Ozyorno-Kuznetsovsky Selsoviet, Uglovsky District, Altai Krai, Russia. The population was 1,243 as of 2013. It was founded in 1813. There are 10 streets.

== Geography ==
Ozyorno-Kuznetsovo is located 23 km north of Uglovskoye (the district's administrative centre) by road. Ozyorno-Kuznetsovsky Leskhoz is the nearest rural locality.
