= Mirninskoye Urban Settlement =

Mirninskoye Urban Settlement is the name of several municipal formations in Russia.

== Modern urban settlements ==
- Mirninskoye Urban Settlement, a municipal formation which the Urban-Type Settlement of Mirny in Orichevsky District of Kirov Oblast is incorporated as

== Historical urban settlements ==
- Mirninskoye Urban Settlement, a former municipal formation which the then-urban-type settlement of Mirny and three rural localities in Gordeyevsky District of Bryansk Oblast were incorporated as before being demoted in status to that of a rural settlement effective April 2011

== See also ==
- Mirninsky
- Mirny Urban Settlement
