= Pervye Korosteli =

Pervye Korosteli Первые Коростели
- Selo
- Location within Altai Krai Location within Russia
- Coordinates: 51°13′N 80°19′E
- Country: Russia
- Region: Altai Krai
- District: Uglovsky District
- Time zone: UTC+7:00

Pervye Korosteli (Russian: Первые Коростели) is a rural locality (a selo) in Kruglyansky Selsoviet, Uglovsky District, Altai Krai, Russia. The population was 86 as of 2013. It was founded in 1857. There are three streets.

== Geography ==
Pervye Korosteli is located 35 km southeast of Uglovskoye (the district's administrative centre) by road. Gorkov is the nearest rural locality.
