= Ozyorno-Kuznetsovsky Leskhoz =

Ozyorno-Kuznetsovsky Leskhoz Озёрно-Кузнецовский Лесхоз
- Settlement
- Location within Altai Krai Location within Russia
- Coordinates: 51°32′N 80°16′E
- Country: Russia
- Region: Altai Krai
- District: Uglovsky District
- Time zone: UTC+7:00

Ozyorno-Kuznetsovsky Leskhoz (Russian: Озёрно-Кузнецовский Лесхоз) is a rural locality (a settlement) in Ozyorno-Kuznetsovsky Selsoviet, Uglovsky District, Altai Krai, Russia. The population was 304 as of 2013. It was founded in 1958. There are 4 streets.

== Geography ==
Ozyorno-Kuznetsovsky Leskhoz is located 30 km north of Uglovskoye (the district's administrative centre) by road. Ozyorno-Kuznetsovo is the nearest rural locality.
