= Kuybyshevo, Russia =

Kuybyshevo (Russian: Куйбышево) is the name of several rural localities in Russia:

- Kuybyshevo, Krasnoshchyokovsky District, Altai Krai, a selo in Kuybyshevsky Selsoviet of Krasnoshchyokovsky District in Altai Krai; 51°34′N 82°59′E
- Kuybyshevo, Rubtsovsky District, Altai Krai, a settlement in Kuybyshevsky Selsoviet of Rubtsovsky District in Altai Krai; 51°35′N 81°8′E
- Kuybyshevo, Uglovsky District, Altai Krai, a selo in Kruglyansky Selsoviet of Uglovsky District in Altai Krai; 51°21′N 80°35′E
- Kuybyshevo, Republic of Dagestan, a selo in Kalinovsky Selsoviet of Tarumovsky District in the Republic of Dagestan; 44°2′N 46°31′E
- Kuybyshevo, Republic of Khakassia, a selo in Kuybyshevsky Selsoviet of Beysky District in the Republic of Khakassia
- Kuybyshevo, Rostov Oblast, a selo in Kuybyshevskoye Rural Settlement of Kuybyshevsky District in Rostov Oblast
