= Gordeyevka =

Gordeyevka (Russian: Горде́евка) is the name of several rural localities in Russia:

- Gordeyevka, Altai Krai, a selo in Khayryuzovsky Selsoviet of Troitsky District of Altai Krai
- Gordeyevka, Bryansk Oblast, a selo in Gordeyevsky Selsoviet of Gordeyevsky District of Bryansk Oblast
- Gordeyevka, Kursk Oblast, a selo in Gordeyevsky Selsoviet of Korenevsky District of Kursk Oblast
- Gordeyevka, Nizhny Novgorod Oblast, a village in Gorevsky Selsoviet of Koverninsky District of Nizhny Novgorod Oblast
- Gordeyevka, Yaroslavl Oblast, a village in Zarubinsky Rural Okrug of Myshkinsky District of Yaroslavl Oblast
