= Mirny, Uglovsky District, Altai Krai =

Mirny Мирный
- Settlement
- Location within Altai Krai Location within Russia
- Coordinates: 51°25′N 79°57′E
- Country: Russia
- Region: Altai Krai
- District: Uglovsky District
- Time zone: UTC+7:00

Mirny (Russian: Мирный) is a rural locality (a settlement) in Shadrukhinsky Selsoviet, Uglovsky District, Altai Krai, Russia. The population was 641 as of 2013. It was founded in 1954. There are 12 streets.

== Geography ==
Mirny is located 22 km northwest of Uglovskoye (the district's administrative centre) by road. Bor-Kosobulat is the nearest rural locality.
