= Kuybyshevo, Uglovsky District, Altai Krai =

Kuybyshevo Куйбышево
- Selo
- Location within Altai Krai Location within Russia
- Coordinates: 51°21′N 80°34′E
- Country: Russia
- Region: Altai Krai
- District: Uglovsky District
- Time zone: UTC+7:00

Kuybyshevo (Russian: Куйбышево) is a rural locality (a selo) in Kruglyansky Selsoviet, Uglovsky District, Altai Krai, Russia. The population was 189 as of 2013. There are 2 streets.

== Geography ==
Kuybyshevo is located 40 km east of Uglovskoye (the district's administrative centre) by road. Vtorye Korosteli is the nearest rural locality.
