= Myrnyi (surname) =

Myrnyi or Myrny (Ukrainian: Мирний) is a Ukrainian surname. Notable people with the surname include:

- Ivan Myrnyi (born 1954), Ukrainian politician
- Panas Myrny (1849–1920), Ukrainian writer
- Vitaliy Myrnyi (born 1992), Ukrainian footballer

== See also ==
- Mirny (disambiguation)
