= Uglovsky District =

Uglovsky District is the name of several administrative and municipal districts in Russia.

== Districts of the federal subjects ==
Location of Altai Krai in Russia

- Uglovsky District, Altai Krai, an administrative and municipal district of Altai Krai

== Historical districts ==
- Uglovsky District, Leningrad Oblast (1927–1932), a district of Leningrad Oblast

== See also ==
- Uglovsky (disambiguation)
