= Mirnoe =

Mirnoe may refer to several places in Moldova:

- Mirnoe, a village in Ciobanovca Commune, Anenii Noi district
- Mirnoe, a village in Vinogradovca Commune, Taraclia district

== See also ==
- Mirnoye (disambiguation)
