= Mirny, Gordeyevsky District, Bryansk Oblast =

Mirny Мирный
- Settlement
- Location within Bryansk Oblast Location within Russia
- Coordinates: 52°49′N 31°43′E
- Country: Russia
- Region: Bryansk Oblast
- District: Gordeyevsky District
- Time zone: UTC+3:00

Mirny (Russian: Мирный) is a rural locality (a settlement) and the administrative center of Mirninskoye Rural Settlement, Gordeyevsky District, Bryansk Oblast, Russia. The population was 1,452 as of 2010. There are 15 streets.

== Geography ==
Mirny is located 25 km southwest of Gordeyevka (the district's administrative centre) by road. Kozhany is the nearest rural locality.
