= Kuibysheve =

Kuibysheve may refer to a number of settlements in Ukraine, named after Valerian Kuybyshev. All of them have been renamed or are to be renamed according to the law prohibiting names of Communist origin.

== Urban-type settlements ==
- Albat, Bakhchysarai Raion, Crimea, formerly Kuibysheve
- Kamianka, Polohy Raion, Zaporizhzhia Oblast, formerly Kuibysheve

== Villages ==
- Kuibysheve, Yakymivka Raion, in Zaporizhzhia Oblast
- Kuibysheve, Brovary Raion, in Kyiv Oblast
- Kuibysheve, Bobrynets Raion, in Kirovohrad Oblast
- Kuibysheve, Snihurivka Raion, in Mykolaiv Oblast
- Kuibysheve, Orzhytsia Raion, in Poltava Oblast
- Kuibysheve, Shyshaky Raion, in Poltava Oblast
- Kuibysheve, Beryslav Raion, in Kherson Oblast
- former name of village Maloyanysol in Donetsk Oblast before 1995

== Rural settlements (Hamlets) ==
- Kuibysheve, Yalta, in the Autonomous Republic of Crimea
- Kuibysheve, Kherson, in Kherson Oblast

== See also ==
- Kuybyshevo (disambiguation), the Russian equivalent
