= Mirny =

Mirny (masculine), Mirnaya (feminine), or Mirnoye (neuter) may refer to:

== People ==
- Max Mirnyi (Mirny) (b. 1977), Belarusian tennis player

== Fictional characters ==
- Mirny, a character in Alpha Scorpio, an Australian children's sci-fi series

== Places ==
- Mirny Urban Okrug, a municipal formation which the town of oblast significance of Mirny, Arkhangelsk Oblast, Russia is incorporated as
- Mirny Urban Settlement, several municipal urban settlements in Russia, e.g.
  - Mirny, in Sakha Republic
- Mirny, Russia (Mirnaya, Mirnoye), several inhabited localities in Russia
- Mirny, Maykopsky District, Republic of Adygea
- Myrnyi (Mirny), an urban-type settlement in Crimea
- Mirny Airport, an airport in the Sakha Republic, Russia
- Mirnyy Peak (Mirny), a peak in the north of Rothschild Island, Antarctica
- Mirny Rupes, a mountain chain on planet Mercury
- Mirnyy (village), a small village located in Kostroma Oblast, Russia
- Mirny (Kazakhstan), a mining town in East Kazakhstan

== Other ==
- Mirny (sloop-of-war), a ship of the First Russian Antarctic Expedition in 1819–1821
- Mir mine (Mirny mine), an abandoned open pit diamond mine in the Sakha Republic, Russia
- Mirny Station, a Russian research station in Antarctica
- 1610 Mirnaya, a main-belt asteroid

== See also ==
- List of places named after peace
- Mir (disambiguation)
- Mirninsky (disambiguation)
