= Mirny Urban Settlement =

Mirny Urban Settlement is the name of several municipal formations in Russia.

- Mirny Urban Settlement, a municipal formation which the town under republic jurisdiction of Mirny in Mirninsky District of the Sakha Republic is incorporated as
- Mirny Urban Settlement, a municipal formation which the urban-type settlement of Mirny in Krasnoyarsky District of Samara Oblast is incorporated as

== See also ==
- Mirny
- Mirninskoye Urban Settlement
