= Mirny, Zhirnovsky District, Volgograd Oblast =

Mirny Мирный
- Settlement
- Location within Volgograd Oblast Location within Russia
- Coordinates: 50°58′N 45°00′E
- Country: Russia
- Region: Volgograd Oblast
- District: Zhirnovsky District
- Time zone: UTC+4:00

Mirny (Russian: Мирный) is a rural locality (a settlement) in Alyoshnikovskoye Rural Settlement, Zhirnovsky District, Volgograd Oblast, Russia. The population was 57 as of 2010.

== Geography ==
Mirny is located in forest steppe of Volga Upland, 49 km east of Zhirnovsk (the district's administrative centre) by road. Novinka is the nearest rural locality.
