= Mirny, Novonikolayevsky District, Volgograd Oblast =

Mirny Мирный
- Settlement
- Location within Volgograd Oblast Location within Russia
- Coordinates: 51°11′N 42°49′E
- Country: Russia
- Region: Volgograd Oblast
- District: Novonikolayevsky District
- Time zone: UTC+4:00

Mirny (Russian: Мирный) is a rural locality (a settlement) and the administrative center of Mirnoye Rural Settlement, Novonikolayevsky District, Volgograd Oblast, Russia. The population was 673 as of 2010. There are 15 streets.

== Geography ==
Mirny is located in steppe, on the Khopyorsko-Buzulukskaya Plain, 49 km northeast of Novonikolayevsky (the district's administrative centre) by road. Sapozhok is the nearest rural locality.
