= Kuybyshevo, Republic of Dagestan =

Kuybyshevo Куйбышево
- Selo
- Location within Republic of Dagestan Location within Russia
- Coordinates: 44°01′N 46°30′E
- Country: Russia
- Region: Republic of Dagestan
- District: Tarumovsky District
- Time zone: UTC+3:00

Kuybyshevo (Russian: Куйбышево) is a rural locality (a selo) in Kalinovsky Selsoviet, Tarumovsky District, Republic of Dagestan, Russia. Population: 36 (2010 census); 51 (2002 census); 42 (1989 Soviet census).

== Geography ==
Kuybyshevo is located 24 km southwest of Tarumovka (the district's administrative centre) by road. Tarumovka is the nearest rural locality.
