= Mirny, Yegoryevsky District, Altai Krai =

Mirny Мирный
- Settlement
- Location within Altai Krai Location within Russia
- Coordinates: 51°47′N 81°16′E
- Country: Russia
- Region: Altai Krai
- District: Yegoryevsky District
- Time zone: UTC+7:00

Mirny (Russian: Мирный) is a rural locality (a settlement) in Pervomaysky Selsoviet of Yegoryevsky District, Altai Krai, Russia. The population was 282 as of 2014. There are 4 streets.

== Geography ==
Mirny is located 38 km east of Novoyegoryevskoye (the district's administrative centre) by road. Tishinka is the nearest rural locality.
