= Mirny, Burlinsky District, Altai Krai =

Mirny Мирный
- Passing loop
- Location within Altai Krai Location within Russia
- Coordinates: 53°24′N 78°13′E
- Country: Russia
- Region: Altai Krai
- District: Burlinsky District
- Time zone: UTC+7:00

Mirny (Russian: Мирный) is a rural locality (a passing loop) in Burlinsky Selsoviet, Burlinsky District, Altai Krai, Russia. The population was 1 as of 2013. It was founded in 1955. There is 1 street.

== Geography ==
Mirny is located 12 km northwest of Burla (the district's administrative centre) by road. Kineral is the nearest rural locality.
