= Mirny, Vladimir Oblast =

Mirny Мирный
- Settlement
- Location within Vladimir Oblast Location within Russia
- Coordinates: 56°17′N 40°46′E
- Country: Russia
- Region: Vladimir Oblast
- District: Kameshkovsky District
- Time zone: UTC+3:00

Mirny (Russian: Мирный) is a rural locality (a settlement) in Vtorovskoye Rural Settlement, Kameshkovsky District, Vladimir Oblast, Russia. The population was 611 as of 2010. There are 6 streets.

== Geography ==
Mirny is located 22 km southwest of Kameshkovo (the district's administrative centre) by road. Pishchikhino is the nearest rural locality.
