= Mirny, Rodinsky District, Altai Krai =

Mirny Мирный
- Settlement
- Location within Altai Krai Location within Russia
- Coordinates: 52°33′N 80°09′E
- Country: Russia
- Region: Altai Krai
- District: Rodinsky District
- Time zone: UTC+7:00

Mirny (Russian: Мирный) is a rural locality (a settlement) and the administrative center of Mirnensky Selsoviet, Rodinsky District, Altai Krai, Russia. The population was 1,552 as of 2013. There are 13 streets.

== Geography ==
Mirny is located 9 km north of Rodino (the district's administrative centre) by road. Rodino is the nearest rural locality.
