= Mirny, Nekhayevsky District, Volgograd Oblast =

Mirny Мирный
- Settlement
- Location within Volgograd Oblast Location within Russia
- Coordinates: 50°16′N 41°33′E
- Country: Russia
- Region: Volgograd Oblast
- District: Nekhayevsky District
- Time zone: UTC+4:00

Mirny (Russian: Мирный) is a rural locality (a settlement) in Dinamovskoye Rural Settlement, Nekhayevsky District, Volgograd Oblast, Russia. The population was 34 as of 2010. There are 2 streets.

== Geography ==
Mirny is located 29 km southwest of Nekhayevskaya (the district's administrative centre) by road. Dinamo is the nearest rural locality.
