= Mirny, Syamzhensky District, Vologda Oblast =

Mirny Мирный
- Settlement
- Location within Vologda Oblast Location within Russia
- Coordinates: 60°10′N 41°43′E
- Country: Russia
- Region: Vologda Oblast
- District: Syamzhensky District
- Time zone: UTC+3:00

Mirny (Russian: Мирный) is a rural locality (a settlement) in Dvinitskoye Rural Settlement, Syamzhensky District, Vologda Oblast, Russia. The population was 255 as of 2002. There are 5 streets.

== Geography ==
Mirny is located 64 km northeast of Syamzha (the district's administrative centre) by road. Averinskaya is the nearest rural locality.
