= Mirny, Republic of Bashkortostan =

Mirny Мирный
- Selo
- Location within Bashkortostan Location within Russia
- Coordinates: 54°41′N 54°51′E
- Country: Russia
- Region: Bashkortostan
- District: Blagovarsky District
- Time zone: UTC+5:00

Mirny (Russian: Мирный) is a rural locality (a selo) and the administrative centre of Mirnovsky Selsoviet, Blagovarsky District, Bashkortostan, Russia. The population was 1,067 as of 2010. There are 18 streets.

== Geography ==
Mirny is located 17 km west of Yazykovo (the district's administrative centre) by road. Toporinka is the nearest rural locality.
