= Mirny, Konoshsky District, Arkhangelsk Oblast =

Mirny Мирный
- Settlement
- Location within Arkhangelsk Oblast Location within Russia
- Coordinates: 61°04′N 40°04′E
- Country: Russia
- Region: Arkhangelsk Oblast
- District: Konoshsky District
- Time zone: UTC+3:00

Mirny (Russian: Мирный) is a rural locality (a settlement) in and the administrative center of Mirny Rural Settlement, Konoshsky District, Arkhangelsk Oblast, Russia. The population was 339 as of 2012. There are 7 streets.

== Geography ==
It is located on the Plelevitsa River.
