= Mirny, Voronezh Oblast =

Mirny Мирный
- Settlement
- Location within Voronezh Oblast Location within Russia
- Coordinates: 50°41′N 41°06′E
- Country: Russia
- Region: Voronezh Oblast
- District: Vorobyovsky District
- Time zone: UTC+3:00

Mirny (Russian: Мирный) is a rural locality (a settlement) in Beryozovskoye Rural Settlement, Vorobyovsky District, Voronezh Oblast, Russia. The population was 137 as of 2010. There are 2 streets.

== Geography ==
Mirny is located 22 km northeast of Vorobyovka (the district's administrative centre) by road. Muzhichye is the nearest rural locality.
