= Mirny, Zonalny District, Altai Krai =

Mirny Мирный
- Settlement
- Location within Altai Krai Location within Russia
- Coordinates: 52°34′N 85°01′E
- Country: Russia
- Region: Altai Krai
- District: Zonalny District
- Time zone: UTC+7:00

Mirny (Russian: Мирный) is a rural locality (a settlement) and the administrative center of Chemrovsky Selsoviet, Zonalny District, Altai Krai, Russia. The population was 1,487 as of 2013. There are 25 streets.

== Geography ==
Mirny is located 15 km southeast of Zonalnoye (the district's administrative centre) by road. Novaya Chemrovka is the nearest rural locality.
