= Mirnoye, Amur Oblast =

Mirnoye Мирное
- Selo
- Location within Amur Oblast Location within Russia
- Coordinates: 50°44′N 128°36′E
- Country: Russia
- Region: Amur Oblast
- District: Belogorsky District
- Time zone: UTC+9:00

Mirnoye (Russian: Мирное) is a rural locality (a selo) in Prigorodny Selsoviet of Belogorsky District, Amur Oblast, Russia. The population was 227 as of 2018. There are 3 streets.

== Geography ==
Mirnoye is located 25 km south of Belogorsk (the district's administrative centre) by road. Vozzhayevka is the nearest rural locality.
