= Mirny, Astrakhan Oblast =

Mirny Мирный
- Settlement
- Location within Astrakhan Oblast Location within Russia
- Coordinates: 46°22′N 47°55′E
- Country: Russia
- Region: Astrakhan Oblast
- District: Narimanovsky District
- Time zone: UTC+4:00

Mirny (Russian: Мирный) is a rural locality (a settlement) in Solyansky Selsoviet, Narimanovsky District, Astrakhan Oblast, Russia. The population was 514 as of 2010. There are 41 streets.

== Geography ==
Mirny is located 39 km south of Narimanov (the district's administrative centre) by road. Prigorodny is the nearest rural locality.
