= Zhyngyldy, Mangystau Region =

Zhyngyldy Жынгылды جىنگىلدى
- Location within Kazakhstan
- Coordinates: 44°12′07″N 51°42′16″E
- Country: Kazakhstan
- Region: Mangystau
- Elevation: 124 m (407 ft)
- Time zone: UTC+5 (West Kazakhstan Time)
  - Summer (DST): UTC+5 (West Kazakhstan Time)

Zhyngyldy (Kazakh: Жынгылды, Jyngyldy, جىنگىلدى), also known as Zhyngghyldy or Kuybyshevo (Russian: Куйбышево, Kuybyshevo), is a town in Mangystau Region, southwest Kazakhstan. It lies at an altitude of 124 m (407 ft).
