= Mirninsky =

Mirninsky (masculine), Mirninskaya (feminine), or Mirninksoye (neuter) may refer to:

- Mirninsky District, a district of the Sakha Republic, Russia
- Mirninskoye Urban Settlement, several municipal urban settlements in Russia
