= Mirnoye, Republic of Dagestan =

Mirnoye Мирное
- Selo
- Location within Republic of Dagestan Location within Russia
- Coordinates: 43°53′N 46°45′E
- Country: Russia
- Region: Republic of Dagestan
- District: Kizlyarsky District
- Time zone: UTC+3:00

Mirnoye (Russian: Мирное) is a rural locality (a selo) in Kizlyarsky Selsoviet, Kizlyarsky District, Republic of Dagestan, Russia. The population was 149 as of 2010.

== Geography ==
Mirnoye is located 69 km northeast of Kizlyar (the district's administrative centre) by road. Burunnyy and Aga-Batyr are the nearest rural localities.

== Nationalities ==
Tsakhurs, Avars and Russians live there.
