= Mirny, Kulundinsky District, Altai Krai =

Mirny Мирный
- Settlement
- Location within Altai Krai Location within Russia
- Coordinates: 52°28′N 79°03′E
- Country: Russia
- Region: Altai Krai
- District: Kulundinsky District
- Time zone: UTC+7:00

Mirny (Russian: Мирный) is a rural locality (a settlement) in Kursky Selsoviet, Kulundinsky District, Altai Krai, Russia. The population was six as of 2013. There are two streets.

== Geography ==
Mirny is located 17 km southeast of Kulunda (the district's administrative centre) by road. Vinogradovka is the nearest rural locality.
