= Gordeyevka, Bryansk Oblast =

Rural locality in Bryansk Oblast, Russia

Gordeyevka Гордеевка
- Selo
- Interactive map of Gordeyevka
- Location of Gordeyevka Gordeyevka (Bryansk Oblast)
- Coordinates: 52°57′30″N 31°58′37″E
- Country: Russia
- Federal subject: Bryansk Oblast
- Rural SettlementSelsoviet: Gordeyevsky Rural Settlement

Population
  - Estimate (2013): 3,014 )

Municipal status
  - Municipal district: Gordeyevsky District
- Time zone: UTC+3 (MSK)
- Postal code: 243650
- Dialing code: +7 48340
- OKTMO ID: 15611406101

Gordeyevka (Russian: Горде́евка) is a rural locality (a selo) in Bryansk Oblast, Russia. It is the administrative, transport, trade and economical center of Gordeyevsky District. Population: 3,109 (2010 census); 3,066 (2002 census); 2,742 (1989 Soviet census).

The selo is located in Central Russia southwest of Moscow near the border with Belarus in the west of the Bryansk Oblast.

In 2018 year the total population of the Gordeyevsky district was 10 620, with the population of Gordeyevka accounting for 28.4% of that number.

Gordeevka is one of the most comfortable and largest rural settlements in Bryansk Oblast.

== Geography ==
Gordeyevka lies in western European Russia in the central to western parts of the East European Plain.

The relief is a typical East European Plain landscape, with alternating rolling hills and shallow lowlands, although lowlands dominate.

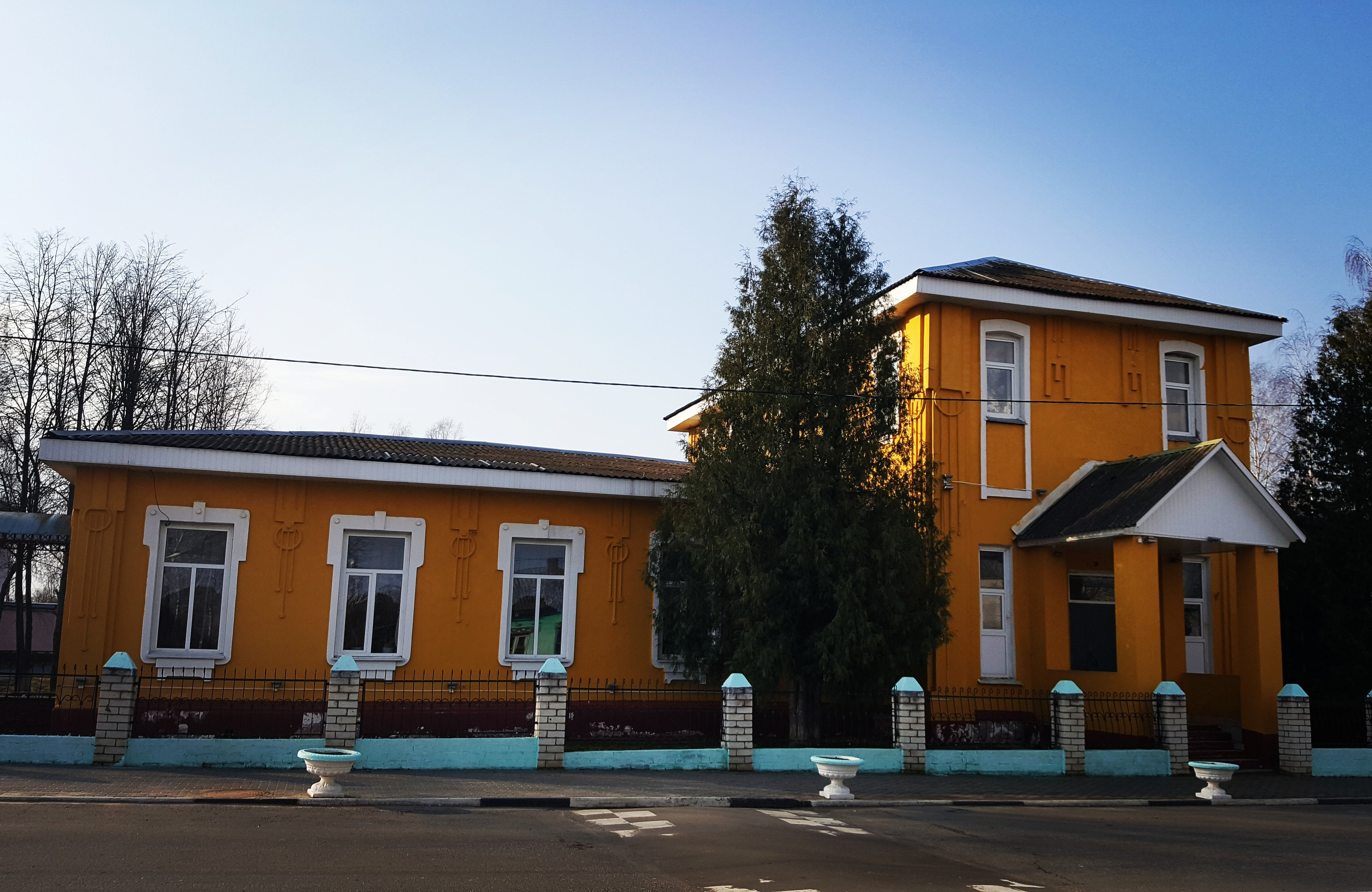
School in Gordeevka

Climate is temperate continental. The average temperature in January is −7 to −9 °C (19 to 16 °F). The average July temperature is +18 to +19 °C (64 to 66 °F). Average annual precipitation varies from 560 to 600 millimetres (22 to 24 in).

== Ecological problems ==
As a result of the Chernobyl disaster on April 26, 1986, part of the territory of Bryansk Oblast has been contaminated with radionuclides (mainly Gordeyevsky, Klimovsky, Klintsovsky, Krasnogorsky, Surazhsky, and Novozybkovsky Districts). In 1999, some 226,000 people lived in areas with the contamination level above 5 Curie/km^{2}, representing approximately 16% of the oblast's population.

== Administrative and municipal structure ==
There are 9 settlements in the Gordeyevskoe rural settlement.

Settlements of Gordeyevskoe rural settlement of Bryansk Oblast
No.	Settlements name	Russian name	Type	Population (people)
1	Veliky Bor	Великий Бор	village	33
2	Gordeevka	Гордеевка	selo	3014
3	Zhovnets	Жовнец	selo	0
4	Zavod-Koretsky	Завод-Корецкий	village	215
5	Zeleny Klin	Зелёный Клин	village	3
6	Medvyodovka	Медвёдовка	village	15
7	Pokon	Поконь	village	146
8	Smely	Смелый	village	64
9	Shamry	Шамры	village	6

== Sights ==
Church of the Ascension in the village Veliky Bor of Gordeevskoe rural settlement of Bryansk Oblast

The supplier on the hill of intermediaries is the compositional center of his development. Year of construction of the church (by order of Count Bezborodko) - 1809. By now, the side porticos and the top of the bell tower have been lost. An interesting example of a cross-shaped manor church in the style of mature classicism. Around the building were comparatively short side arms, which were slightly protruding rectangular altars ending in a lowered semicircular apse.

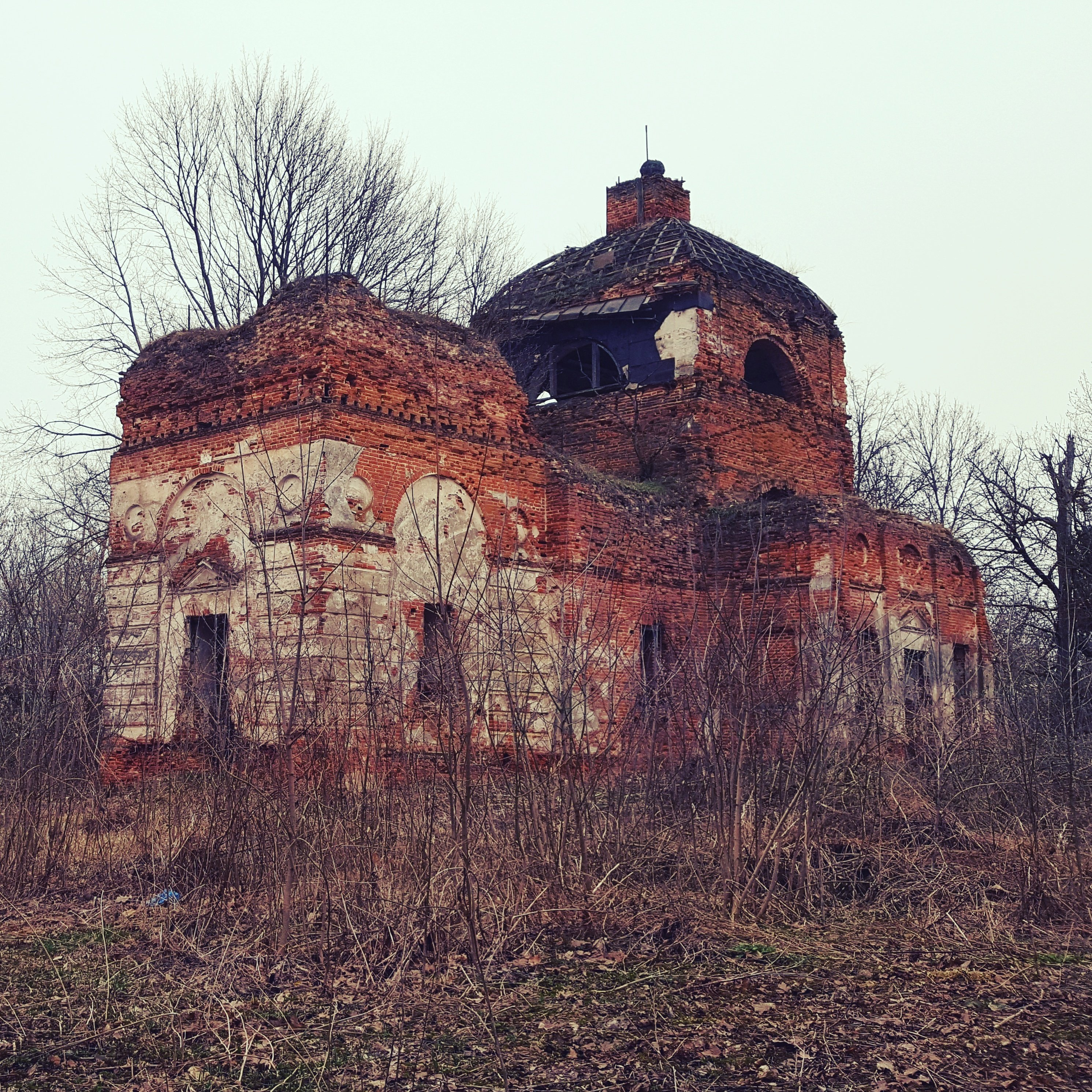
Ruins of the church in the village Veliky Bor (1809)

The originality of the composition is given by a large light quadrangle towering over the center with a tetrahedral dome cover and a small dome on a cubic pedestal. A small refectory with one window on the side facades is adjoined by a preserved quadrangle of the bell tower. All facades of the building at the level of the apse cornice are bypassed by a profiled belt. Four Tuscan pilasters decorating the ends of the side arms correspond to the columns of the lost porticoes.

Between them in the center there are side entrances marked with triangular sandrids, and on the sides - rectangular windows; above the openings there are, respectively, an oval and two round niches. In the upper part of each facet of the quadrangle, a large semicircular three-part Empire-type window is cut. The tier of the bell tower is decorated with large flat arched niches in the center of the facets, rusticated corner parts to the waist and round niches-medallions above it. In the interior, all the side parts are completely open into the high central one, forming a single space of the temple. The central part is covered with a four-lane closed vault, the altar is covered with a conch, and the altar vima, the side arms and the refectory are covered with cylindrical vaults. The lower tier of the bell tower with rounded inner corners has a corrugated vault along the north–south axis. On the sides of the trapezoidal passage to the refectory, there are small rooms with a staircase in the southern one. Only the plaster cornices at the base of the vaults and at the top of the main quadrangle, as well as pilasters between the windows on the north and south walls, have survived from the interior decoration.
