= Gordeyevsky District =

Gordeyevsky District Гордеевский район (Russian)
- District
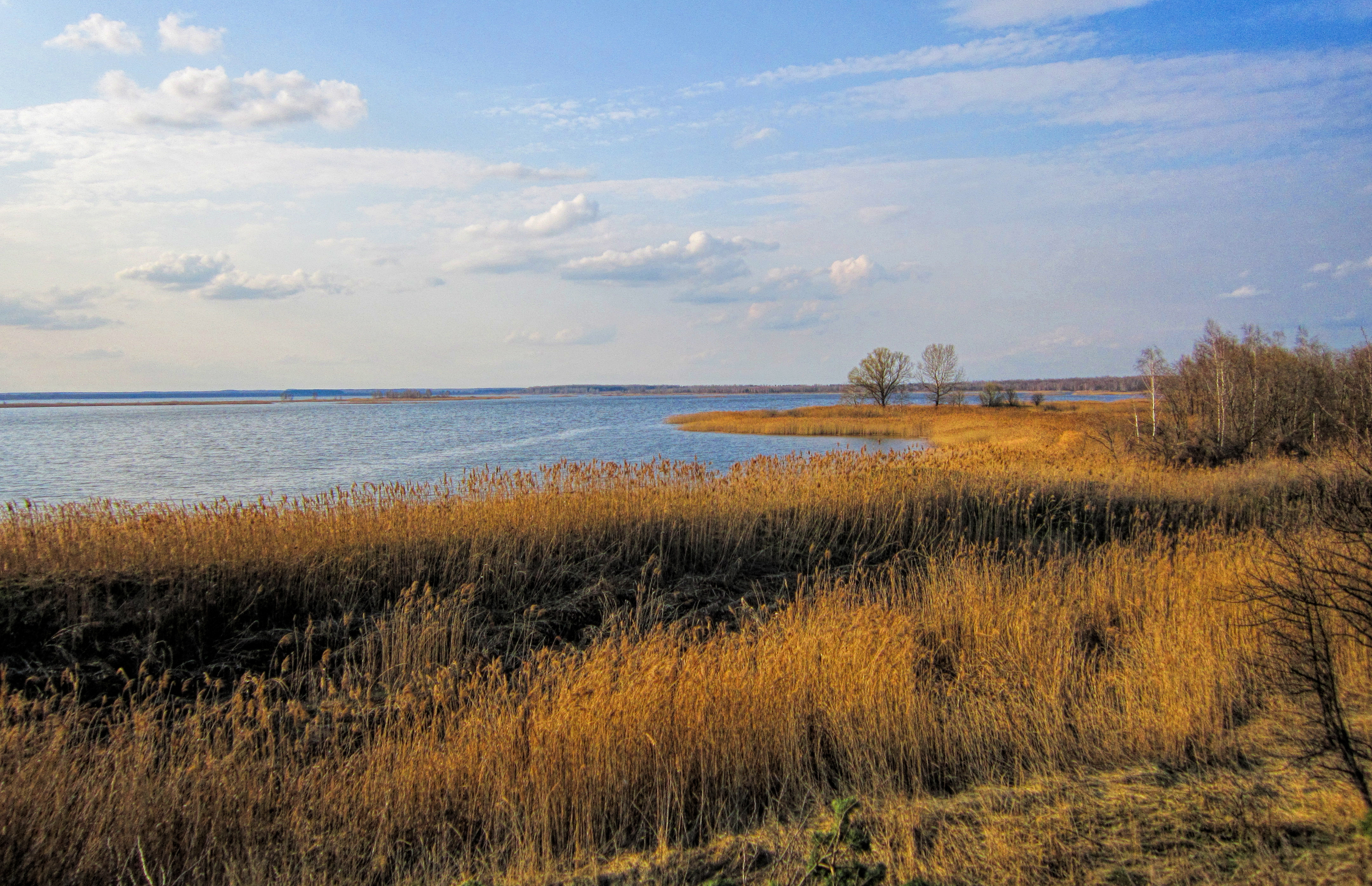
- Kozhanovsky Lake, in Gordeyevsky District

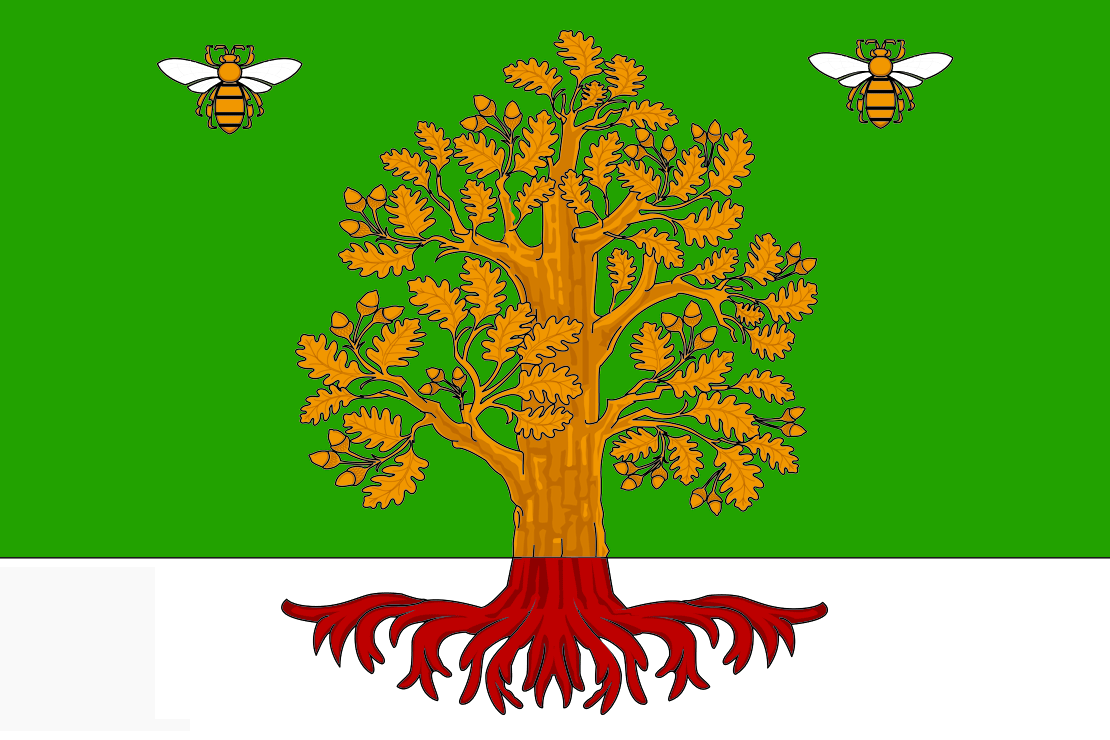
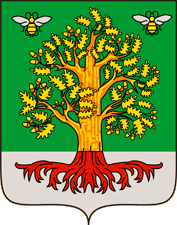
- Flag Coat of arms
- Location of Gordeyevsky District in Bryansk Oblast
- Coordinates: 52°57′N 31°59′E
- Country: Russia
- Federal subject: Bryansk Oblast
- Established: 1929
- Administrative center: Gordeyevka

Area
  - Total: 846.54 km^{2} (326.85 sq mi)

Population (2010 Census)
  - Total: 12,218
  - Estimate (2018): 10 620
  - Density: 14.433/km^{2} (37.381/sq mi)
  - Urban: 11.9%
  - Rural: 88.1%

Administrative structure
  - Administrative divisions: 7 Rural administrative okrugs
  - Inhabited localities: 51 rural localities

Municipal structure
  - Municipally incorporated as: Gordeyevsky Municipal District
  - Municipal divisions: 0 urban settlements, 7 rural settlements
- Time zone: UTC+3 (MSK)
- OKTMO ID: 15611000
- Website: http://admgordeevka.ru

Population of Gordeyevsky District
- 2021 Census: 10,060
- 2010 Census: 12,218
- 2002 Census: 13,956
- 1989 Census: 16,675

Gordeyevsky District (Russian: Горде́евский райо́н) is an administrative and municipal district (raion), one of the twenty-seven in Bryansk Oblast, Russia. It is located in the west of the oblast and borders with Kastsyukovichy' District in Mogilev region of Belarus in the north, Surazhsky District in the east, Klintsovsky and Novozybkovsky Districts in the south, and Krasnogorsky District in the west. A distance between the center of Gordeyevscky District (the rural locality (a selo) of Gordeyevka) and the center of Bryansk Oblast (The city of Bryansk) is 240 km. The center of District and the center of Oblast are connected by motor roads only.

The area of the district is 846.54 square kilometers (326.85 sq mi).

Its administrative center is the rural locality (a selo) of Gordeyevka. In 2018 year the total population of the district was 10 620, with the population of Gordeyevka accounting for 28.4% of that number. In 2021, population was 10,060 (2021 census).

== Administrative and municipal status ==
Within the framework of administrative divisions, Gordeyevsky District is one of the twenty-two in the Bryansk Oblast. Gordeyevka serves as its administrative center. Gordeyevka is a strategically important point, being at the intersection of roads connecting the roads to Krasnaya Gora, Kostyukovichi, Surazh, Klintsy.

== Geography ==
Gordeyevsky District lies in western European Russia in the central to western parts of the East European Plain.

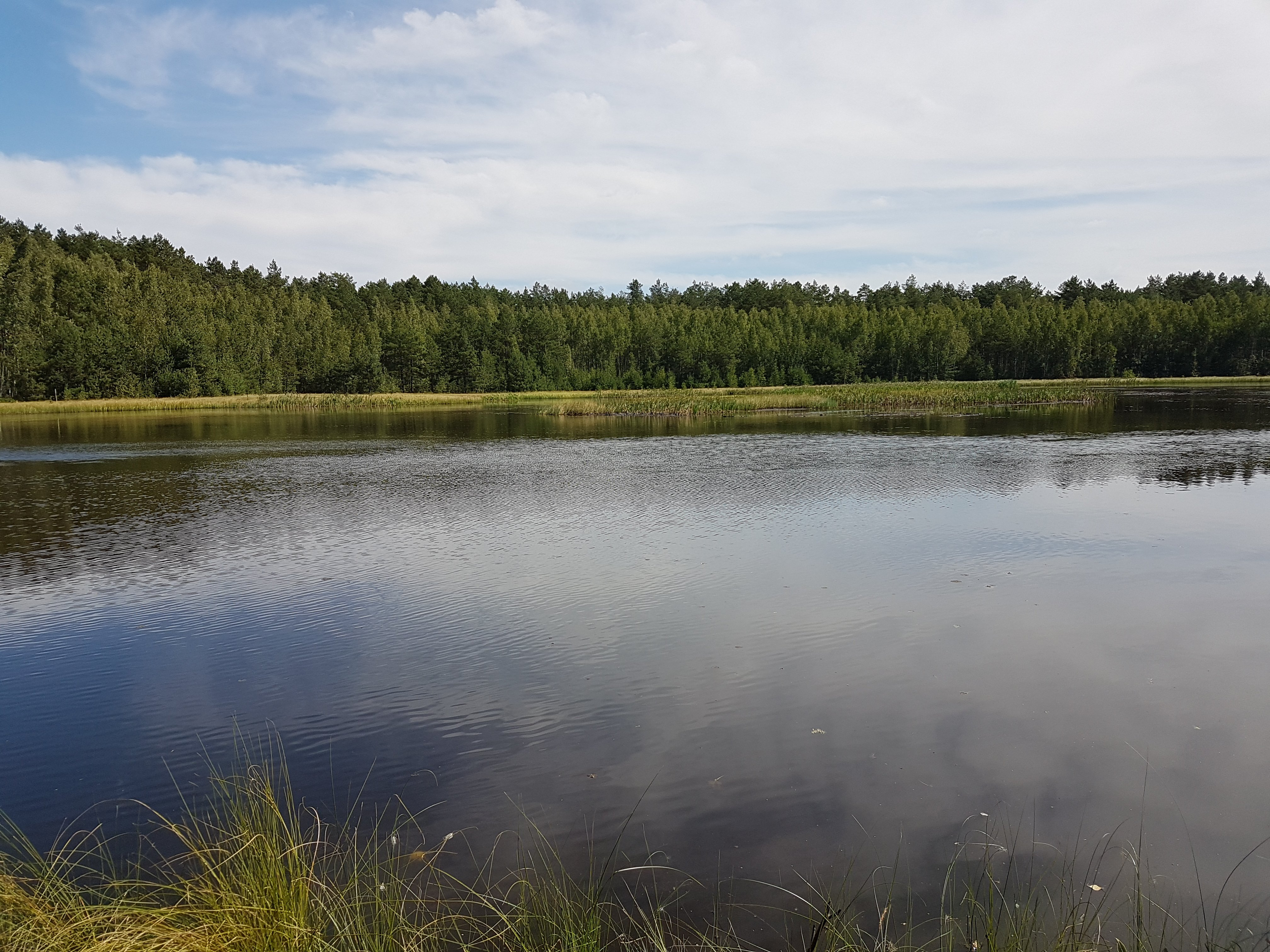
The forest lake in the Gordeevsky district of Bryansk region

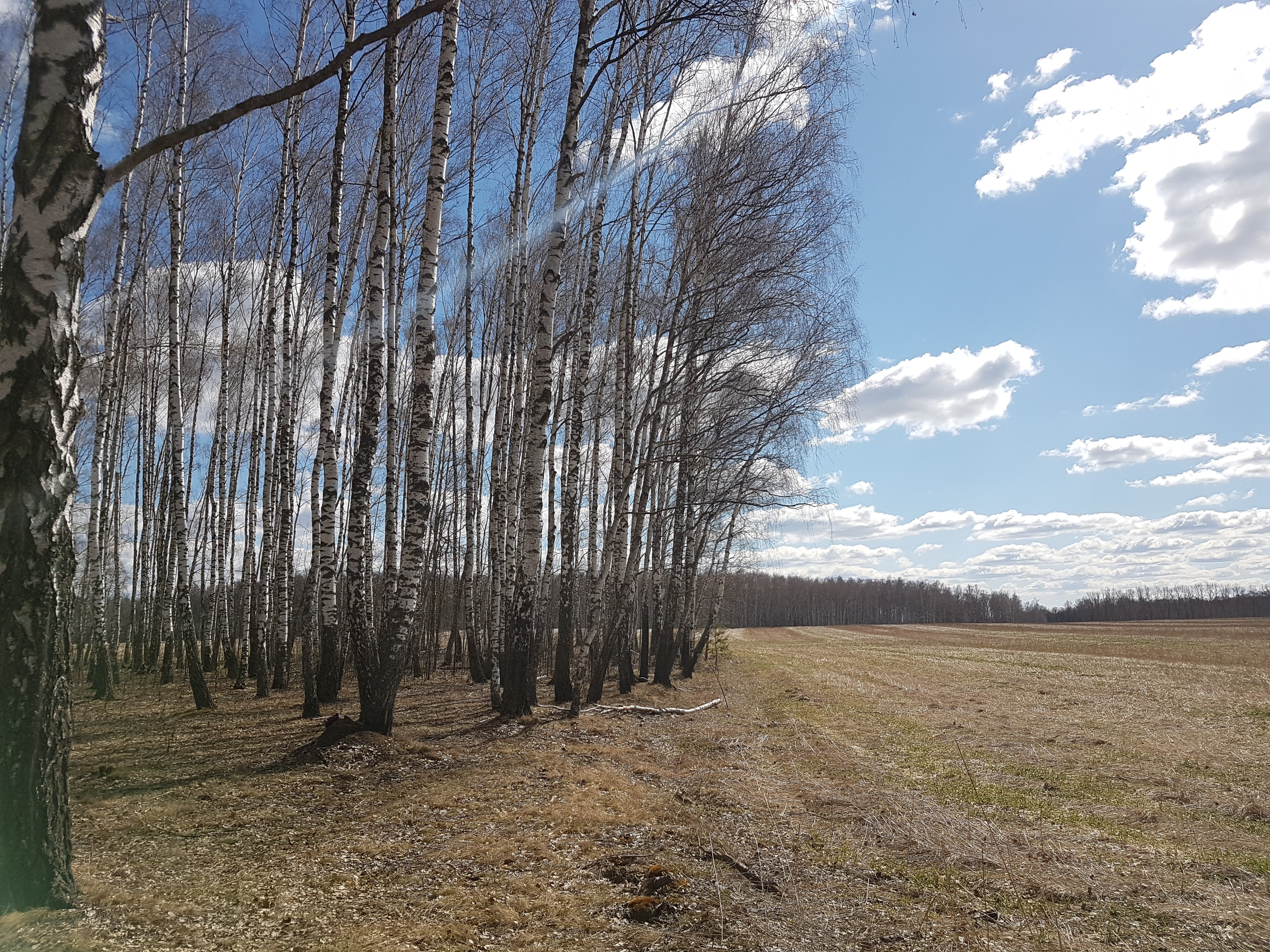
Nature of Gordeevsky district of Bryansk region

The relief is a typical East European Plain landscape, with alternating rolling hills and shallow lowlands, although lowlands dominate.

Climate is temperate continental. The average temperature in January is −7 to −9 °C (19 to 16 °F). The average July temperature is 18 to 19 °C (64 to 66 °F). Average annual precipitation varies from 560 to 600 millimeters (22 to 24 inches).

== History ==
The historical fate of the Gordeevsky district is connected with its geographical location. In ancient times, the tribes of the Radimichs lived on the territory of the region. From the second half of the XIV century, among a significant part of the Bryansk lands, the territory of the present Gordeevsky region became part of the Grand Duchy of Lithuania, and after the conclusion of the treaty on the union (unification) of Lithuania with Poland in 1385, into the united Polish-Lithuanian state.

Since 1503, these lands were transferred to the Moscow state, but 115 years later, according to the Deulinsky agreement of 1618, they again retreat to Poland for several decades.

After the victory over the Grand Duchy of Lithuania, the lands were annexed to Russia. In 1654, the entire left bank of the Dnieper (Little Russia), including the southwestern lands of the Bryansk region, administratively and militarily were divided into regiments and hundreds. One of the largest Little Russian regiments was Starodubsky, which included the lands of the present Gordeyevsky district, approved as an independent one in 1663 (before that it was part of the Nizhyn regiment). It consisted of 10 hundred (Starodubskaya, Mglinskaya, Pochepskaya, Pogarskaya, etc.).

Until 1781, the entire territory of the present Gordeevsky district was part of the New Town Hundreds of the Starodubsky Regiment.

In 1781, the division into shelves and hundreds was replaced by division into counties and governorships (from 1796 - provinces). Since 1802, Starodubshchina, from which Mglinsky, Novomestsky (later Novozybkovsky), Starodubsky and Surazhsky districts were formed, became part of the Chernigov province.

In 1861, among other volosts, the Gordeevskaya volost of the Surazh district of the Chernigov province was formed (since 1921 the district became known as Klintsovsky, and in December 1926 it was annexed to the Bryansk province).

In 1941, the Gordeevsky district was occupied by German troops for 25 months, from August 20, 1941. to September 27, 1943. During this time, 189 people were killed in the region, 272 people were taken to Germany, material damage amounted to 285 million rubles in monetary terms of the 1940s.

Gordeyevka was a strategically important point for the Nazi troops, being at the intersection of roads connecting the roads to Krasnaya Gora, Kostyukovichi, Surazh, Klintsy. From the first days of the occupation, a partisan war flared up in the region. Ambushes were set up, bridges, ferries, telephone communications were destroyed. The "Vperyod" special purpose detachment operated on the territory of the Gordeevsky district since August 1941, and already in 1943 it grew into a brigade. At first, there were 28 guys and one girl. For the partisans, the underground gathered weapons and medicines, distributed leaflets and reports from the Sovinformburo, and collected valuable intelligence.

== Ecological problems ==
As a result of the Chernobyl disaster on April 26, 1986, part of the territory of Bryansk Oblast has been contaminated with radionuclides (mainly Gordeyevsky, Klimovsky, Klintsovsky, Krasnogorsky, Surazhsky, and Novozybkovsky Districts). In 1999, some 226,000 people lived in areas with the contamination level above 5 Curie/km^{2}, representing approximately 16% of the oblast's population.

== District establishment ==
The Gordeevsky District was formed in 1929 and was originally part of the Klintsovsky District of the Western Region, and since 1937 - in the newly formed Oryol Region.

On July 5, 1944, by the Decree of the Presidium of the Supreme Soviet of the USSR, the Bryansk region was formed, which, along with others, included the Gordeevsky region. In the period from 1963 to 1985, the district was temporarily abolished, and its territory was divided between the Klintsovsky and Krasnogorsky districts. Restored August 15, 1985.

== Economy ==
The economy of the Gordeevsky district is predominantly of an agricultural type. In the regional center there are more than 10 grocery stores, 2 pharmacies, 2 hardware stores, a restaurant-cafe "Slavyanka", a cafe "Vdokhnovenie".

Of the large enterprises, the Tvorishinsky distillery was located on the territory of the Gordeevsky district (currently the enterprise does not work).

Gordeevka is the economic center of the region. There are concentrated workplaces, which are used by both Gordeevites and residents of the region. The branches of Sberbank of Russia and the Bank's Post provide loans to enterprises of the Gordeevsky district. Commercial sector enterprises are located on the central Lenin street. Their greatest concentration is in the area of the central square at the intersection of Kirov and Lenin streets, the longest and most important transport "arteries" of Gordeevka.

Currently, the predominant employment of the population is provided by budgetary institutions (school, district hospital, police, court, pension fund).

В целом Гордеевский район можно причислить к числу депрессивных регионов (порядка 80% бюджета района - это дотации из областного бюджета).

There are 123 enterprises of all forms of property in the district. The number of legal entities without the formation of a legal entity is 153. The district economy employs 3 500 people. The district has one of the highest indicators in Bryansk region (about 90%) in terms of gasification of settlements. All schools, hospitals and public houses have been supplied of natural gas.

The economy of the district is mostly agricultural. Economic growth prospects are associated with the development of agricultural production and manufacturing industry.

== Agriculture ==
Gordeyevsky district is an agricultural one, and the prospects for economic growth are associated with the development of agricultural production and processing industry. The agro-industrial complex of the region includes all categories of farms: personal subsidiary plots (62.8%), peasant farms (1.5%), agricultural enterprises of the public sector (35.7%). The main branches of agriculture in the region are plant growing and animal husbandry. Crop production specializes in the cultivation of grain crops and potato growing, and animal husbandry has a pronounced dairy and meat orientation. On the territory of the district (SEC "Mayak") there is a pedigree reproducer for breeding beef cattle of the Aberdeen Angus breed. In recent years, the region's agricultural producers have received significant support from the state. These are various subsidies for manufactured products, the provision of preferential loans, assistance in the purchase of agricultural machinery.

Despite the measures taken, the main problems of agricultural production remain: -great degree of wear and tear of the machine and tractor fleet; -low supply of qualified personnel; - rise in prices for fuels and lubricants, energy carriers and spare parts. Considering the dynamics of the main indicators of agriculture, characterizing the efficiency of local government bodies, the following should be noted: - The value of the indicator "The proportion of profitable large and medium-sized agricultural organizations in their total number" in 2008 decreased compared to 2007 by 9.6%. In general, the number of profitable businesses has not decreased. The decrease in this indicator occurred due to the fact that these enterprises have passed to the status of small enterprises. In 2009–2011, the value of this indicator is forecasted at the level of 100%. The main way to achieve financial stability of agricultural producers is to attract credit resources and investments. A private investor in the cultivation of rapeseed for grain takes part in the 2009 sowing company. This crop covers 1,500 hectares. - The area of agricultural land in the district is 57352 hectares.

Infection of the territory of the region with radionuclides, as a result of the accident at the Chernobyl nuclear power plant in 1986, negatively affected the socio-economic situation in the region. 4200 hectares of agricultural land were withdrawn from circulation. As a result of a complex of agrotechnical measures and migration processes, there was a change in the levels of radioactive contamination of the arable layer. This contributed to the conservation of all agricultural land. In 2009–2011. the share of actually used agricultural land in their total area was 100%.

=== Economic prospects ===
- Breeding of valuable varieties of fish.
- Development of limestone deposits.
- Construction of a brick factory.
- Development of peat deposits.
- Development of forest resources.
- Construction of a Holiday House near the village of Cherny Ruchey, on the border with the Surazh District of the Bryansk Region.
- Construction of a pig farm for 10,000 heads.
- Farming development.

== Population ==
11,750 people live in 51 settlements (the entire population is rural). The able-bodied population is about 56%.

population size (people)
2002	2009	2010	2011	2012	2013	2014
13956	12401	12218	12137	11750	11223	11223
2015	2016	2017	2018			
10940	10956	10771	10620			
Population of Gordeyevsky district, 2002-2018

== Administrative and municipal structure ==
Gordeevsky district within the framework of the administrative-territorial structure of the region, includes 7 municipality units - 7 rural administrative districts (rural settlements).

№	Municipality units	Russian name	Administrative center	Russian name	Number of settlements	Population (people)	area (km^{2})
1	Glinnovskoe rural settlement	Глинновское сельское поселение	selo Glinnoe	село Глинное	6	822	113,69
2	Gordeevskoe rural settlement	Гордеевское сельское поселение	selo Gordeevka	село Гордеевка	9	3399	164,01
3	Mirninskoe rural settlement	Мирнинское сельское поселение	village Mirnoe	поселок Мирный	2	1735	52,12
4	Petrovobudskoe rural settlement	Петровобудское сельское поселение	selo Petrova Buda	село Петрова Буда	7	964	133,08
5	Rudnevorobyovskoe rural settlement	Рудневоробьёвское сельское поселение	village Rudnya-Vorobyovka	деревня Рудня-Воробьевка	10	1104	125,78
6	Tvorishinskoe rural settlement	Творишинское сельское поселение	selo Tvorishino	село Творишино	9	1542	96,57
7	Unoshevskoe rural settlement	Уношевское сельское поселение	selo Unoshevo	село Уношево	8	1054	161,29

There are 51 settlements in the Gordeevsky district and there are not urban settlements.

Settlements of Gordeevsky District of Bryansk Oblast
№	Settlements name	Russian name	Type	Population (people)	Municipality
1	Alisovka	Алисовка	village	83	Unoshevskoe rural settlement
2	Antonovka	Антоновка	village	63	Unoshevskoe rural settlement
3	Belitsa	Белица	village	30	Tvorishinskoe rural settlement
4	Borets	Борец	village	4	Glinnovskoe rural settlement
5	Veliky Bor	Великий Бор	village	33	Gordeevskoe rural settlement
6	Vladimirovka	Владимировка	village	10	Petrovobudskoe rural settlement
7	Glinnoe	Глинное	selo	340	Glinnovskoe rural settlement
8	Gordeevka	Гордеевка	selo	3014	Gordeevskoe rural settlement
9	Dmitrievka	Дмитриевка	village	7	Rudnevorobyovskoe rural settlement
10	Dubrovka	Дубровка	village	0	Tvorishinskoe rural settlement
11	Zhovnets	Жовнец	selo	0	Gordeevskoe rural settlement
12	Zavod-Koretsky	Завод-Корецкий	village	215	Gordeevskoe rural settlement
13	Zalipovye	Залиповье	village	1	Petrovobudskoe rural settlement
14	Zeleniy Klin	Зелёный Клин	village	3	Gordeevskoe rural settlement
15	Iput	Ипуть	village	8	Tvorishinskoe rural settlement
16	Kazarichi	Казаричи	selo	159	Tvorishinskoe rural settlement
17	Kozhany	Кожаны	selo	361	Mirninskoe rural settlement
18	Kolybeli	Колыбели	village	6	Glinnovskoe rural settlement
19	Kreshchenskiy	Крещенский	village	9	Tvorishinskoe rural settlement
20	Kuznetsy	Кузнецы	selo	215	Unoshevskoe rural settlement
21	Maloudebnoe	Малоудёбное	village	156	Petrovobudskoe rural settlement
22	Medvedovka	Медвёдовка	village	15	Gordeevskoe rural settlement
23	Mirny	Мирный	village	1374	Mirninskoe rural settlement
24	Mikhailovka	Михайловка	village	115	Tvorishinskoe rural settlement
25	Nezhcha	Нежча	village	32	Rudnevorobyovskoe rural settlement
26	Novonovitskaya	Новоновицкая	village	54	Rudnevorobyovskoe rural settlement
27	Novoselie	Новоселье	village	4	Glinnovskoe rural settlement
28	Peretin	Перетин	selo	207	Petrovobudskoe rural settlement
29	Petrakovka	Петраковка	village	0	Rudnevorobyovskoe rural settlement
30	Petrova Buda	Петрова Буда	selo	356	Petrovobudskoe rural settlement
31	Pokon	Поконь	village	146	Gordeevskoe rural settlement
32	Popovka	Поповка	village	135	Rudnevorobyovskoe rural settlement
33	Rudnya-Vorobyovka	Рудня-Воробьёвка	village	318	Rudnevorobyovskoe rural settlement
34	Smelyy	Смелый	village	64	Gordeevskoe rural settlement
35	Smyalch	Смяльч	selo	345	Petrovobudskoe rural settlement
36	Staraya Polona	Старая Полона	village	168	Rudnevorobyovskoe rural settlement
37	Staronovitskaya	Староновицкая	village	290	Rudnevorobyovskoe rural settlement
38	Strugova Buda	Стругова Буда	selo	437	Glinnovskoe rural settlement
39	Strugovka	Струговка	village	93	Glinnovskoe rural settlement
40	Sugrodovka	Сугродовка	village	1	Petrovobudskoe rural settlement
41	Tvorishino	Творишино	selo	1021	Tvorishinskoe rural settlement
42	Udel	Удел	village	0	Rudnevorobyovskoe rural settlement
43	Unoshevo	Уношево	selo	398	Unoshevskoe rural settlement
44	Fedorovka	Фёдоровка	village	21	Tvorishinskoe rural settlement
45	Fedorovka	Фёдоровка	village	20	Unoshevskoe rural settlement
46	Kharmynka	Хармынка	village	137	Unoshevskoe rural settlement
47	Chernetovka	Чернетовка	village	11	Unoshevskoe rural settlement
48	Chornyy Ruchey	Чёрный Ручей	village	232	Tvorishinskoe rural settlement
49	Shamry	Шамры	village	6	Gordeevskoe rural settlement
50	Shiryaevka	Ширяевка	selo	233	Rudnevorobyovskoe rural settlement
51	Yamnoe	Ямное	village	272	Unoshevskoe rural settlement

== Sights ==
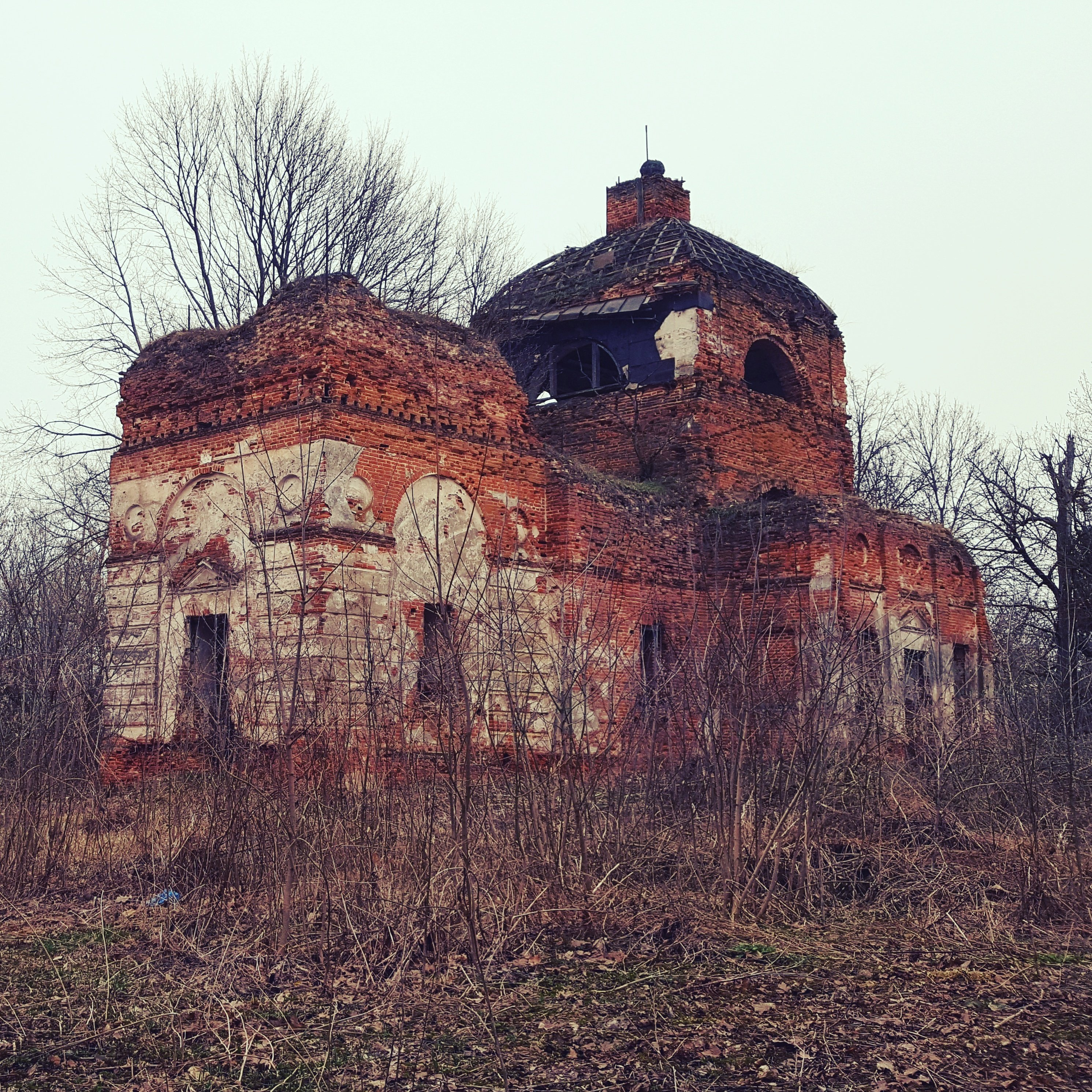
Ruins of the church in the village Veliky Bor (1809)

=== Specially protected natural area, natural monument of regional significance "Siniy Vir" ===
The natural monument was formed with the aim of preserving the valuable natural complex of the river floodplain. Iput:

- a site with steep river bends and a deep whirlpool;
- wintering pit for fish;
- places of growth of a pure white water lily, included in the Red Book of the Bryansk region;
- area of floodplain deciduous forests.

==== Geographical position ====
Bryansk region, Gordeevsky district, section of the river. Iput and its floodplains between the settlements of Kazarichi and Iput, 8 km southeast of the village. Gordeevka.The natural monument includes a section of the river. Iput and the adjoining territory of forest lands of the Borkovsky district forestry of the Klintsovsky forestry.

==== Natural features ====
The length of the river Iput within the natural monument about 2 km. In this section, the river bed has three bends. On the site of the second bend there is a whirlpool 4 – 5 m deep, the width of the channel in this place is about 140 m. The width of the river is on average 40 – 60 m, the depth is 2.5 – 3 m. The current is weak. The bottom is silty-clayey, sometimes sandy-clayey. The left bank is an elevated, steep, sandy, 1.5 - 2.0 m high, covered with forest.

Riverbed aquatic communities and floodplain deciduous forest. In the tree layer of forest communities: pedunculate oak, heart-leaved linden, Norway maple, common ash, black alder (sticky), elm, aspen, etc. In the dense shrub layer: bird cherry, brittle buckthorn, blood-red svidina, common viburnum, euonymus warty, kumanika, raspberry, etc. In the plantation, dying trees, dead wood and dead wood are noted. In the herbaceous layer, nemoral forest and wet meadow species are common: hairy sedge, raven's eye, stiff-leaved stellate, meadow beetle, oak beetle, hedgehog, creeping buttercup, river gravilat, common runny, ivy budra, plantain large, timothy grass, loosestrife, meadowsweet, lily of the valley, spring rank, unclear lungwort, wintering horsetail, medicinal comfrey, willow loosestrife, double-leaved minecloth, common bracken, common blackhead, etc. .; in damp depressions - marsh cinquefoil, acute sedge, reed, etc.

Church of the Ascension in the village Veliky Bor

The supplier on the hill of intermediaries is the compositional center of his development. Year of construction of the church (by order of Count Bezborodko) - 1809. By now, the side porticos and the top of the bell tower have been lost. An interesting example of a cross-shaped manor church in the style of mature classicism. Around the building were comparatively short side arms, which were slightly protruding rectangular altars ending in a lowered semicircular apse.

The originality of the composition is given by a large light quadrangle towering over the center with a tetrahedral dome cover and a small dome on a cubic pedestal. A small refectory with one window on the side facades is adjoined by a preserved quadrangle of the bell tower. All facades of the building at the level of the apse cornice are bypassed by a profiled belt. Four Tuscan pilasters decorating the ends of the side arms correspond to the columns of the lost porticoes.

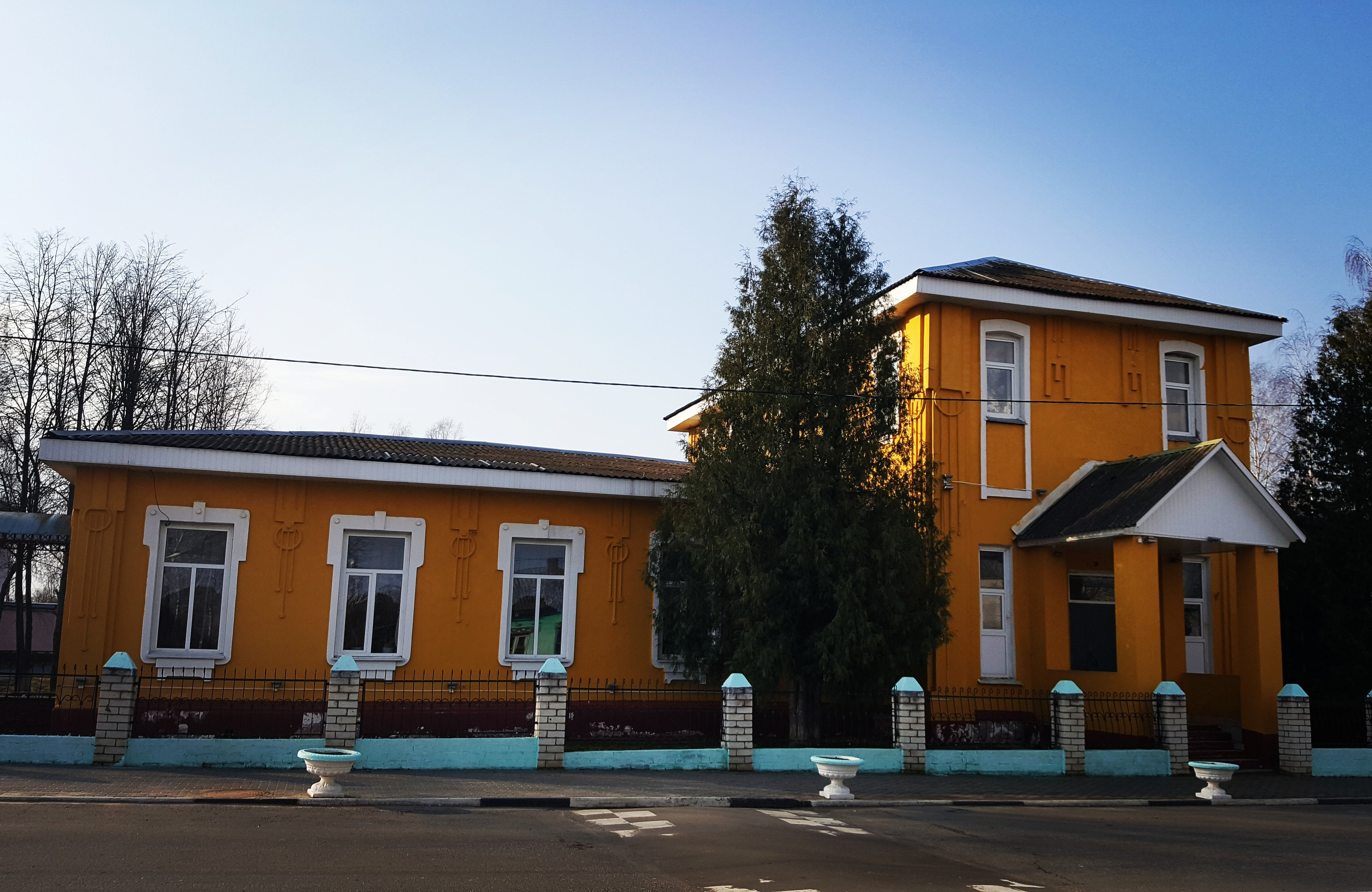
School in Gordeevka

Between them in the center there are side entrances marked with triangular sandrids, and on the sides - rectangular windows; above the openings there are, respectively, an oval and two round niches. In the upper part of each facet of the quadrangle, a large semicircular three-part Empire-type window is cut. The tier of the bell tower is decorated with large flat arched niches in the center of the facets, rusticated corner parts to the waist and round niches-medallions above it. In the interior, all the side parts are completely open into the high central one, forming a single space of the temple.

The central part is covered with a four-lane closed vault, the altar is covered with a conch, and the altar vima, the side arms and the refectory are covered with cylindrical vaults. The lower tier of the bell tower with rounded inner corners has a corrugated vault along the north–south axis. On the sides of the trapezoidal passage to the refectory, there are small rooms with a staircase in the southern one. Only the plaster cornices at the base of the vaults and at the top of the main quadrangle, as well as pilasters between the windows on the north and south walls, have survived from the interior decoration.
