= Uglovskoye =

Rural locality in Uglovsky District, Altai Krai, Russia

Coordinates: 51°21′N 80°12′E

Uglovskoye (Russian: Угловское) is a rural locality (a selo) and the administrative center of Uglovsky District of Altai Krai, Russia. Population: 4,368 (2010 census); 4,781 (2002 census); 4,076 (1989 Soviet census).
