= Uglovsky District, Altai Krai =

Uglovsky District Угловский район (Russian)
- District
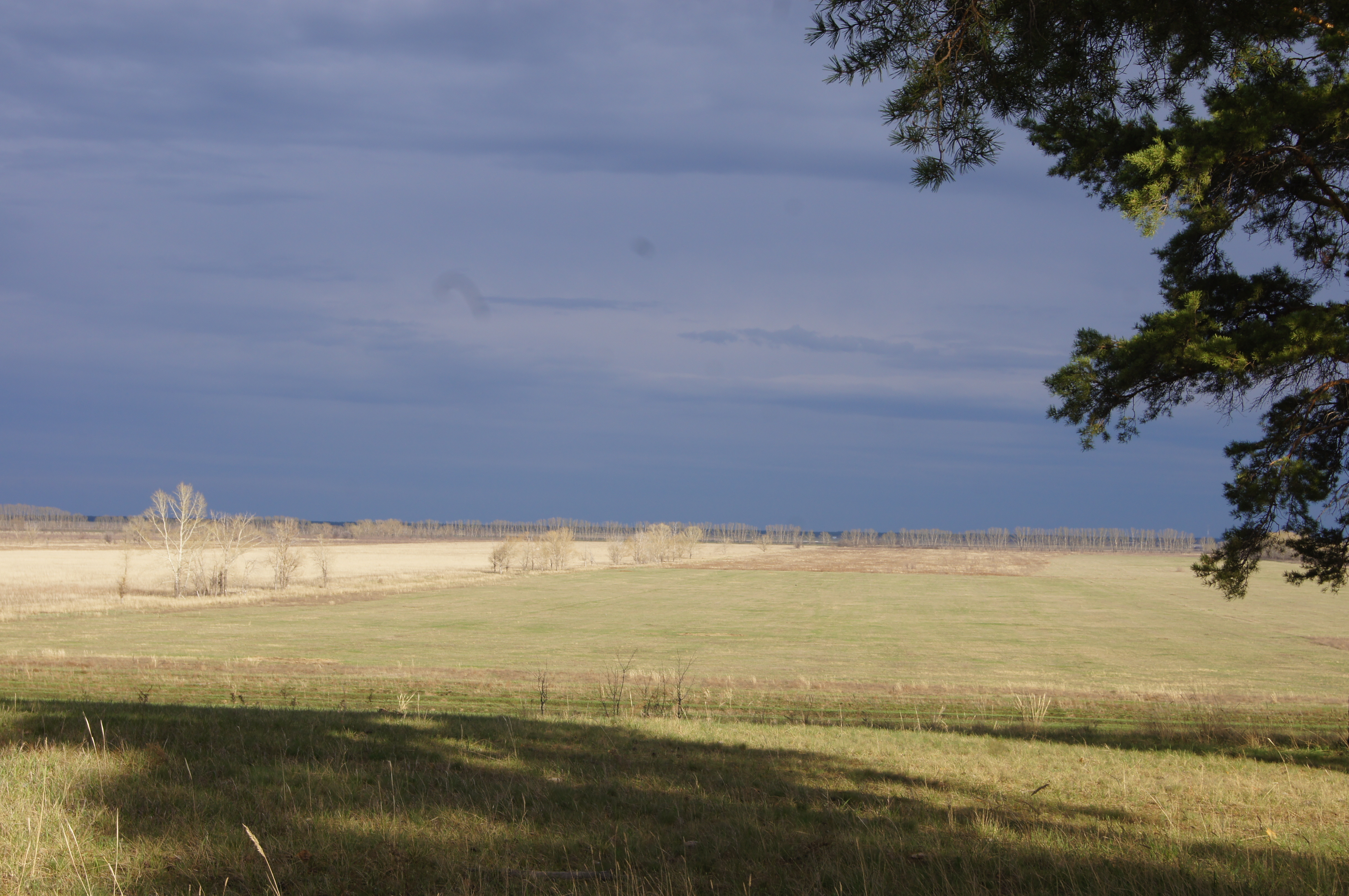
- Fields in Uglovsky District

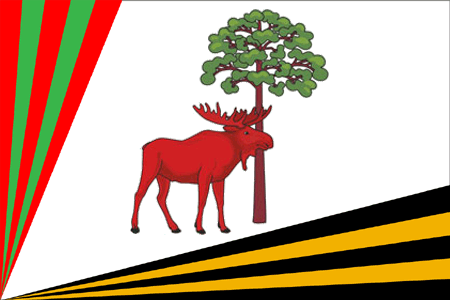
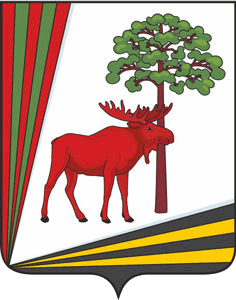
- Flag Coat of arms
- Location of Uglovsky District in Altai Krai
- Coordinates: 51°21′N 80°12′E
- Country: Russia
- Federal subject: Altai Krai
- Established: 1924
- Administrative center: Uglovskoye

Area
  - Total: 4,844 km^{2} (1,870 sq mi)

Population (2010 Census)
  - Total: 13,888
  - Density: 2.867/km^{2} (7.426/sq mi)
  - Urban: 0%
  - Rural: 100%

Administrative structure
  - Administrative divisions: 7 Selsoviets
  - Inhabited localities: 24 rural localities

Municipal structure
  - Municipally incorporated as: Uglovsky Municipal District
  - Municipal divisions: 0 urban settlements, 7 rural settlements
- Time zone: UTC+7 (MSK+4)
- OKTMO ID: 01653000
- Website: http://www.uglovsky.ru

Population of Uglovsky District
- 2010 Census: 13,888
- 2002 Census: 16,073
- 1989 Census: 15,534
- 1979 Census: 16,222

Uglovsky District (Russian: Угло́вский райо́н) is an administrative and municipal district (raion), one of the fifty-nine in Altai Krai, Russia. It is located in the southwest of the krai. The area of the district is 4,844 square kilometers (1,870 sq mi). Its administrative center is the rural locality (a selo) of Uglovskoye. As of the 2010 Census, the total population of the district was 13,888, with the population of Uglovskoye accounting for 31.5% of that number.
