= Kirovsky, Russia =

Kirovsky (Russian: Ки́ровский; masculine), Kirovskaya (Ки́ровская; feminine), or Kirovskoye (Ки́ровское; neuter) is the name of several inhabited localities in Russia.

Urban localities

- Kirovsky, Astrakhan Oblast, a work settlement in Kamyzyaksky District of Astrakhan Oblast
- Kirovsky, Kursk Oblast, a work settlement in Pristensky District of Kursk Oblast
- Kirovsky, Primorsky Krai, an urban-type settlement in Kirovsky District of Primorsky Krai

Rural localities

- Kirovsky, Loktevsky District, Altai Krai, a settlement in Kirovsky Selsoviet of Loktevsky District of Altai Krai
- Kirovsky, Smolensky District, Altai Krai, a settlement in Kirovsky Selsoviet of Smolensky District of Altai Krai
- Kirovsky, Topchikhinsky District, Altai Krai, a settlement in Kirovsky Selsoviet of Topchikhinsky District of Altai Krai
- Kirovsky, Amur Oblast, a settlement in Zeysky District of Amur Oblast
- Kirovsky, Belgorod Oblast, a settlement in Ivnyansky District of Belgorod Oblast
- Kirovsky, name of several other rural localities
- Kirovskaya, Rostov Oblast, a stanitsa in Kagalnitsky District of Rostov Oblast
- Kirovskaya, Tyumen Oblast, a village in Armizonsky District of Tyumen Oblast
- Kirovskoye, Altai Krai, a selo in Aleysky District of Altai Krai
- Kirovskoye, Republic of Bashkortostan, a village in Iglinsky District of the Republic of Bashkortostan
- Kirovskoye, name of several other rural localities

== See also ==
- Kirov, Russia
- Kirovsk (disambiguation)
