= Kirovsky =

Kirovsky (masculine), Kirovskaya (feminine), or Kirovskoye (neuter) (Russian: Кировский, Кировская, Кировское) may refer to:

- Kirovsky District, several districts in the countries of the former Soviet Union
- Kirovsky Urban Settlement (or Kirovskoye Urban Settlement), several municipal urban settlements in Russia
- Kirovsky, Russia (Kirovskaya, Kirovskoye), several inhabited localities in Russia
- Kirovskiy, former name of Xırdalan, Azerbaijan
- Kirovskiy, former name of Kirov, Baku, Azerbaijan
- Kirovskiy, former name of Balpyk Bi, Kazakhstan
- Kirov Oblast (Kirovskaya oblast), a federal subject of Russia
- Kirovskaya metro station, several metro stations in Russia
- Kirovskaya railway station, closed railway stations in St. Peterburg, Russia
- Kirovske (Kirovskoye), an air base in Crimea

== See also ==
- Kirovski, Macedonian last name
- Kirov (disambiguation)
- Kirovsk (disambiguation)
- Kirovske (disambiguation)
- Kirovka (disambiguation)
