= Imeni Kirova =

Imeni Kirova may refer to:

== Geography ==
=== Armenia ===
- Imeni Kirova, Armenia

=== Azerbaijan ===
- Bankə, Azerbaijan; formerly, Imeni Kirova
- Yeni Suraxanı, Azerbaijan; formerly, Imeni Kirova
- Kirov, Baku, Azerbaijan; formerly, Imeni Kirova

=== Kyrgyzstan ===
- several places formerly named "Imeni Kirova", see Kirov (disambiguation)

=== Russia ===
- Imeni Kirova, Russia, name of several rural localities in Russia
