= Kirov =

Kirov may refer to:

- Sergei Kirov (1886–1934), Soviet Bolshevik leader in Leningrad after whom all other entries are named
- Kirov (surname)

== Places ==
=== Armenia ===
- Amrakits, formerly Kirov
- Taperakan, formerly Kirov

=== Azerbaijan ===
- Kirov, Baku
- Kirov, Lankaran
- Kirov, Samukh
- Kirov, Shusha

=== Kyrgyzstan ===
- Kirov, Jalal-Abad, a village in Nooken District, Jalal-Abad Region
- Kirov, Panfilov, a village in Panfilov District, Chuy Region
- Kirov, Ysyk-Ata, a village in Ysyk-Ata District, Chuy Region
- Kirov, Kara-Suu, a village in Kara-Suu District, Osh Region
- Kirov, Özgön, a village in Özgön District, Osh Region

=== Russia ===
- Kirov, Kirov Oblast, a city and the administrative center of Kirov Oblast
- Kirov, Kaluga Oblast, a town in Kaluga Oblast
- Kirov, Republic of Adygea, a khutor in Shovgenovsky District of the Republic of Adygea
- Kirov, Sakha Republic, a selo in Nyurbinsky District of the Sakha Republic
- Kirov Bridge, a bridge across the Daugava in Vitebsk, Belarus
- Kirov Islands, a Russian archipelago in the Kara Sea
- Kirov Square, Yekaterinburg, Russia

== Military ==
- Kirov-class cruiser, a Soviet class of conventional cruisers
  - Soviet cruiser Kirov, the lead ship of the Kirov-class cruisers, launched in 1936
- Kirov-class battlecruiser, a Soviet nuclear-powered cruiser class
  - Soviet battlecruiser Kirov, the lead ship of the Kirov-class battlecruisers, launched in 1977

== Theatre ==
- Kirov Theatre, the name by which the Mariinsky Theatre in Saint Petersburg was known from 1935 to 1992
  - Kirov Orchestra, the former name of the Orchestra of the Mariinsky Theatre
  - Kirov Ballet, the former name of the Mariinsky Ballet
- Kirov Academy of Ballet, a ballet school in Washington D.C.

== See also ==
- Imeni Kirova (disambiguation)
- Kirov, Russia, a list of inhabited localities in Russia
- Kirovka (disambiguation)
- Kirovsk (disambiguation)
- Kirovsky (disambiguation)
