= Kirovsky Urban Settlement =

Kirovsky Urban Settlement or Kirovskoye Urban Settlement is the name of several municipal formations in Russia.

- Kirovsky Urban Settlement, a municipal formation which the Urban-Type Settlement of Kirovsky in Kamyzyaksky District of Astrakhan Oblast is incorporated as
- Kirovsky Urban Settlement, a municipal formation which the Work Settlement of Kirovsky in Pristensky District of Kursk Oblast is incorporated as
- Kirovskoye Urban Settlement, a municipal formation corresponding to Kirovskoye Settlement Municipal Formation, an administrative division of Kirovsky District of Leningrad Oblast
- Kirovskoye Urban Settlement, a municipal formation which the urban-type settlement of Kirovsky and eleven rural localities in Kirovsky District of Primorsky Krai are incorporated as

== See also ==
- Kirovsky (disambiguation)
