= Posëlok Imeni Kirova =

Posëlok Imeni Kirova or Kirova may refer to:

- Yeni Suraxanı, Azerbaijan
- Kirov, Baku, Azerbaijan
