= Gornye Klyuchi =

Human settlement in Kirovsky District, Primorsky Krai, Russia

Coordinates: 45°14′40″N 133°30′0″E

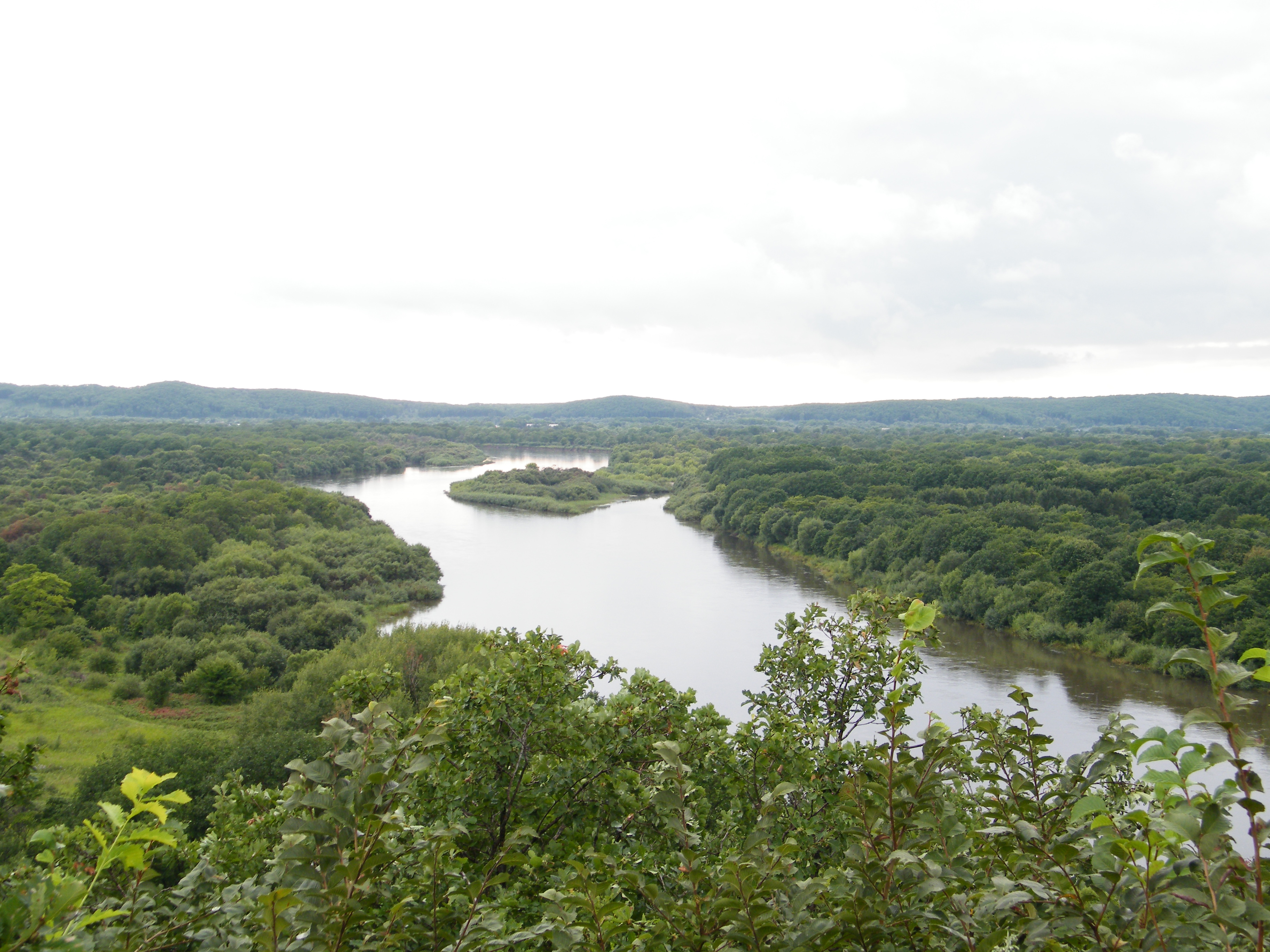

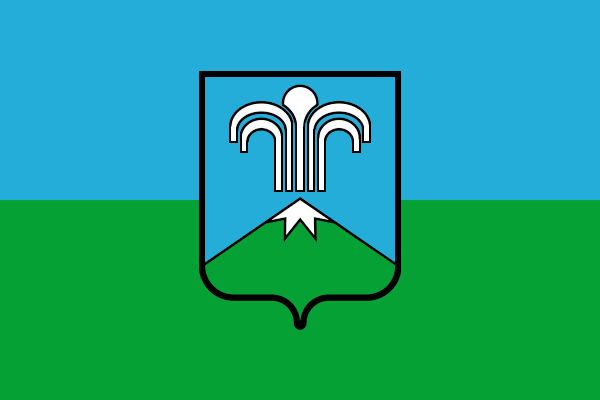
Flag of Gornye Klyuchi

Gornye Klyuchi (Russian: Го́рные Ключи́, lit. mountain springs) is an urban locality (a resort settlement) in Kirovsky District of Primorsky Krai, Russia, located on the Ussuri River near the mouth of the Draguchina River, 16 kilometers (9.9 mi) from the district's administrative center of Kirovsky. Population: 4,586 (2010 census); 5,272 (2002 census); 7,380 (1989 Soviet census).

== History ==
It was founded in 1935 and was granted resort settlement status in 1965.

== Tourism ==
Shmakovka resort and Saint-Trinity Nicholas monastery (Свято-Троицкий Николаевский монастырь), the oldest male monastery in the Russian Far East, are located near Gornye Klyuchi.
