= Parfyonovo =

Parfyonovo Парфёново
- Selo
- Location within Altai Krai Location within Russia
- Coordinates: 52°48′N 82°43′E
- Country: Russia
- Region: Altai Krai
- District: Topchikhinsky District
- Time zone: UTC+7:00

Parfyonovo (Russian: Парфёново) is a rural locality (a selo) in Parfyonovsky Selsoviet, Topchikhinsky District, Altai Krai, Russia. The population was 1,349 as of 2013. There are 25 streets.

== Geography ==
Parfyonovo is located on the Priobskoye Plato, 30 km west of Topchikha (the district's administrative centre) by road. Komsomolsky is the nearest rural locality.
