= Imeni Kirova, Azerbaijan =

Imeni Kirova, Azerbaijan may refer to:

- Bankə - formerly, Imeni Kirova
- Yeni Suraxanı - formerly, Imeni Kirova
- Kirov, Baku - formerly, Imeni Kirova
