= Khabazino =

Khabazino Хабазино
- Selo
- Location within Altai Krai Location within Russia
- Coordinates: 52°44′N 83°22′E
- Country: Russia
- Region: Altai Krai
- District: Topchikhinsky District
- Time zone: UTC+7:00

Khabazino (Russian: Хабазино) is a rural locality (a selo) and the administrative center of Khabazinsky Selsoviet, Topchikhinsky District, Altai Krai, Russia. The population was 488 as of 2013. There are 7 streets.

== Geography ==
Khabazino is located 32 km southeast of Topchikha (the district's administrative centre) by road. Pokrovka is the nearest rural locality.
