= Kirovske =

Kirovske (Ukrainian: Кіровське) may refer to:

- Kirovske, Donetsk Oblast
- Kirovske, Crimea
- Kirovske Raion
- The former name of Obukhivka

== See also ==
- Kirovsk (disambiguation)
