= Kirov class =

Kirov class may refer to:

- Kirov-class battlecruiser, Project 1144 Orlan missile-armed cruisers built for the Soviet Navy in 1980 and serving now in the Russian Navy;
- Kirov-class cruiser, Project 26 cruisers that were built for the Soviet Navy in 1939–1944, served in World War II and were decommissioned by 1974.

== See also ==
Kirov (disambiguation)
