= Azersun Arena =

Football stadium in Yeni Suraxani

Coordinates: 40.4212°N 49.9968°E

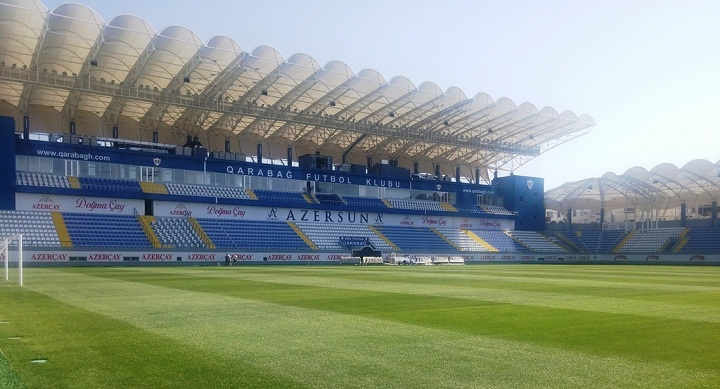
- Interactive map of Azersun Arena
- Location: Yeni Suraxanı, Baku, Azerbaijan
- Owner: Qarabağ FK
- Capacity: 4,677
- Surface: Grass

Construction
- Groundbreaking: 2014
- Opened: 2015
- Architects: SIYA architecture and engineering
- General contractor: İntersun

Tenant
- Qarabağ FK (2015–present)

The Azersun Arena or Tofiq Ismayilov Stadium, also referred to as Surakhani Stadium (Azerbaijani: Azərsun Arena) is a football stadium in Yeni Suraxanı, Baku, Azerbaijan, opened in June 2015. The main tenant of the stadium is Qarabağ, who moved from their home at the Tofiq Bahramov Stadium when it was completed.

== Construction ==
The stadium has a capacity of 5,800 viewers and is based in Yeni Suraxanı. The stadium opened in 2015.

== History ==
Azersun Arena hosted a 2023–24 UEFA Europa Conference League first qualifying round match between Dinamo Minsk and Željezničar.

== See also ==
- List of football stadiums in Azerbaijan
- List of European stadiums by capacity
