= For Democratic Elections =

Political history of Belarus

For democratic elections is the Vitsebsk city club of voters. The first official public organization in Vitsebsk. Organization was founded on January 18, 1990. The first meeting was held in the Palace of Railwaymen, was attended by 69 people. Governing body is the Management Board.

== Objectives ==
The objectives of the organization is to promote the ideas of democracy, national values, supporting the democratic candidates.

== Literature ==
- Вячаслаў Ракіцкі. Сто адрасоў свабоды. 1980—2010. (Бібліятэка Свабоды. ХХІ стагодзьдзе). — Радыё Свабодная Эўропа / Радыё Свабода, 2011. — с. 232 (in Belarusian)
