= Kirov, Russia =

Kirov (Russian: Киров; masculine) or Kirova (Кирова; feminine or masculine genitive) is the name of several inhabited localities in Russia.

== Urban localities ==
- Kirov, Kirov Oblast, a city and the administrative center of Kirov Oblast
- Kirov, Kaluga Oblast, a town in Kaluga Oblast

== Rural localities ==
- Kirov, Republic of Adygea, a khutor in Shovgenovsky District of the Republic of Adygea
- Kirov, Bryansk Oblast, a settlement in Klintsovsky District of Bryansk Oblast
- Kirov, name of several other rural localities
- Kirova, Republic of Bashkortostan, a khutor in Kugarchinsky District of the Republic of Bashkortostan
- Kirova, Volgograd Oblast, a settlement in Svetloyarsky District of Volgograd Oblast
- Kirova, Yaroslavl Oblast, a settlement in Rybinsky District of Yaroslavl Oblast
- Kirov, Sakha Republic, a selo in Nyurbinsky District of the Sakha Republic

== See also ==
- Imeni Kirova, Russia, name of several rural localities in Russia
