= Kirovsky, Topchikhinsky District, Altai Krai =

Kirovsky Кировский
- Settlement
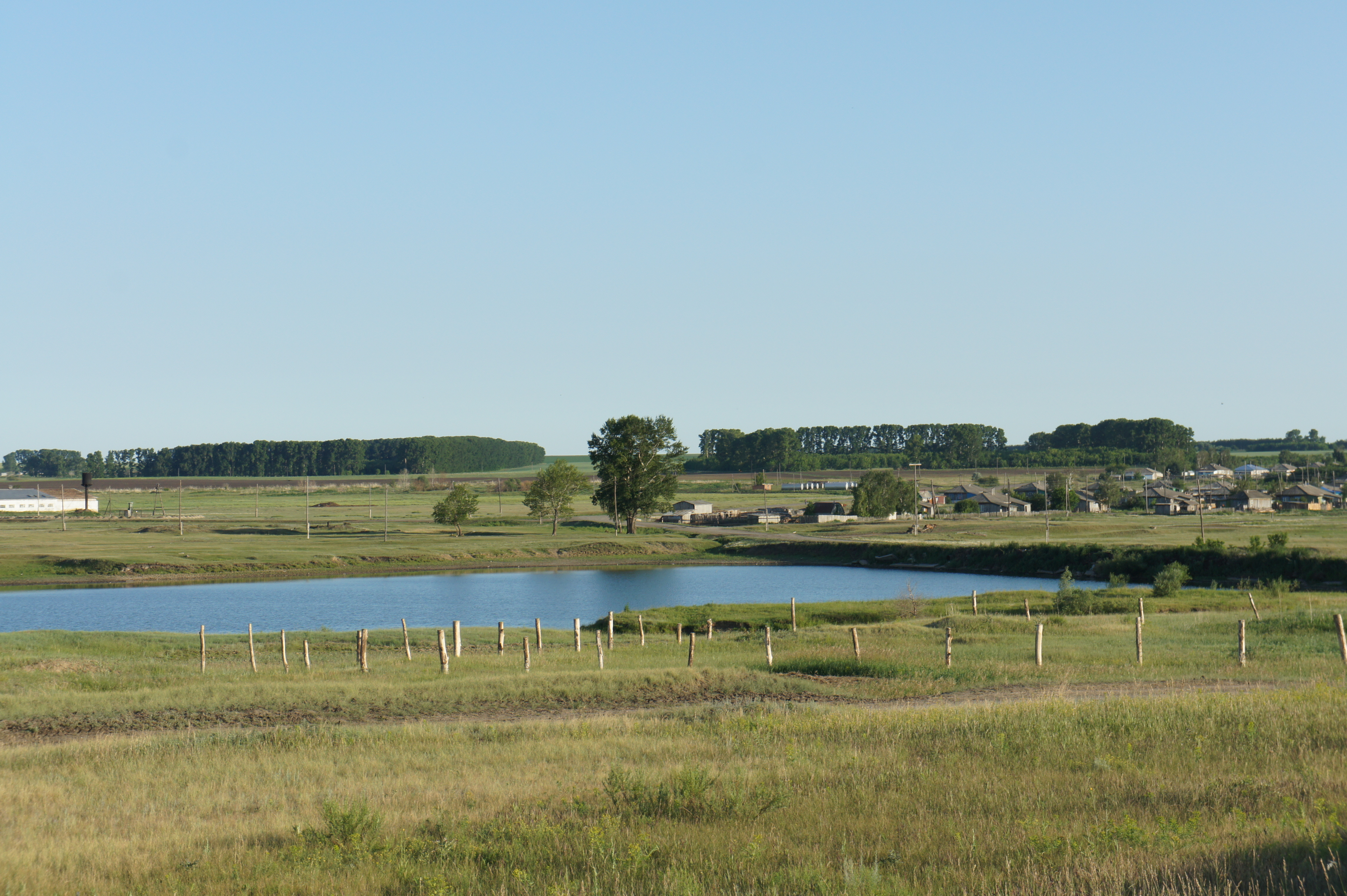

- Location within Altai Krai Location within Russia
- Coordinates: 52°32′N 83°09′E
- Country: Russia
- Region: Altai Krai
- District: Topchikhinsky District
- Time zone: UTC+7:00

Kirovsky (Russian: Кировский) is a rural locality (a settlement) and the administrative center of Kirovsky Selsoviet, Topchikhinsky District, Altai Krai, Russia. The population was 1,034 as of 2013. There are 8 streets.

== Geography ==
Kirovsky is located 39 km south of Topchikha (the district's administrative centre) by road. Sadovy is the nearest rural locality.
