= Kirovsk =

Kirovsk may refer to:

- Kirovsk, Russia, several inhabited localities in Russia
- Kirovsk, Luhansk Oblast, a city in Luhansk Oblast, Ukraine
- Kirovsk, former name of the town Zarichne in Lyman Raion of Donetsk Oblast, Ukraine
- Kirawsk (Kirovsk), a town in Belarus

== See also ==
- Kirov (disambiguation)
- Kirovske (disambiguation)
- Kirovsky (disambiguation)
- Kirovka (disambiguation)
- Kirovo (disambiguation)
