= Vitebsk =

City in Vitebsk Region, Belarus

Vitebsk: Витебск (Russian); Віцебск (Belarusian); Vitsyebsk
- City
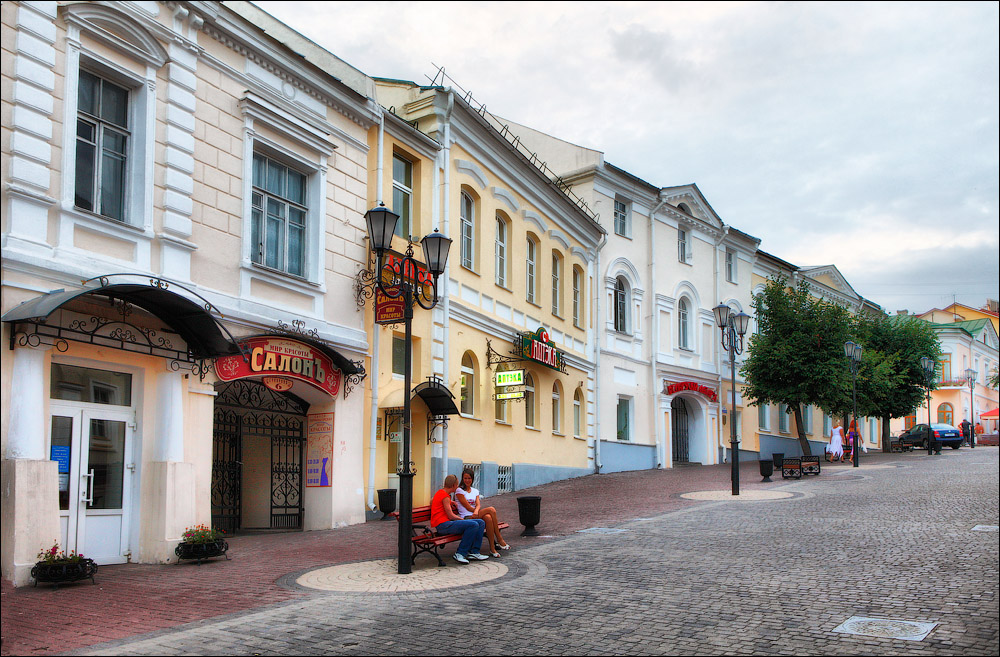
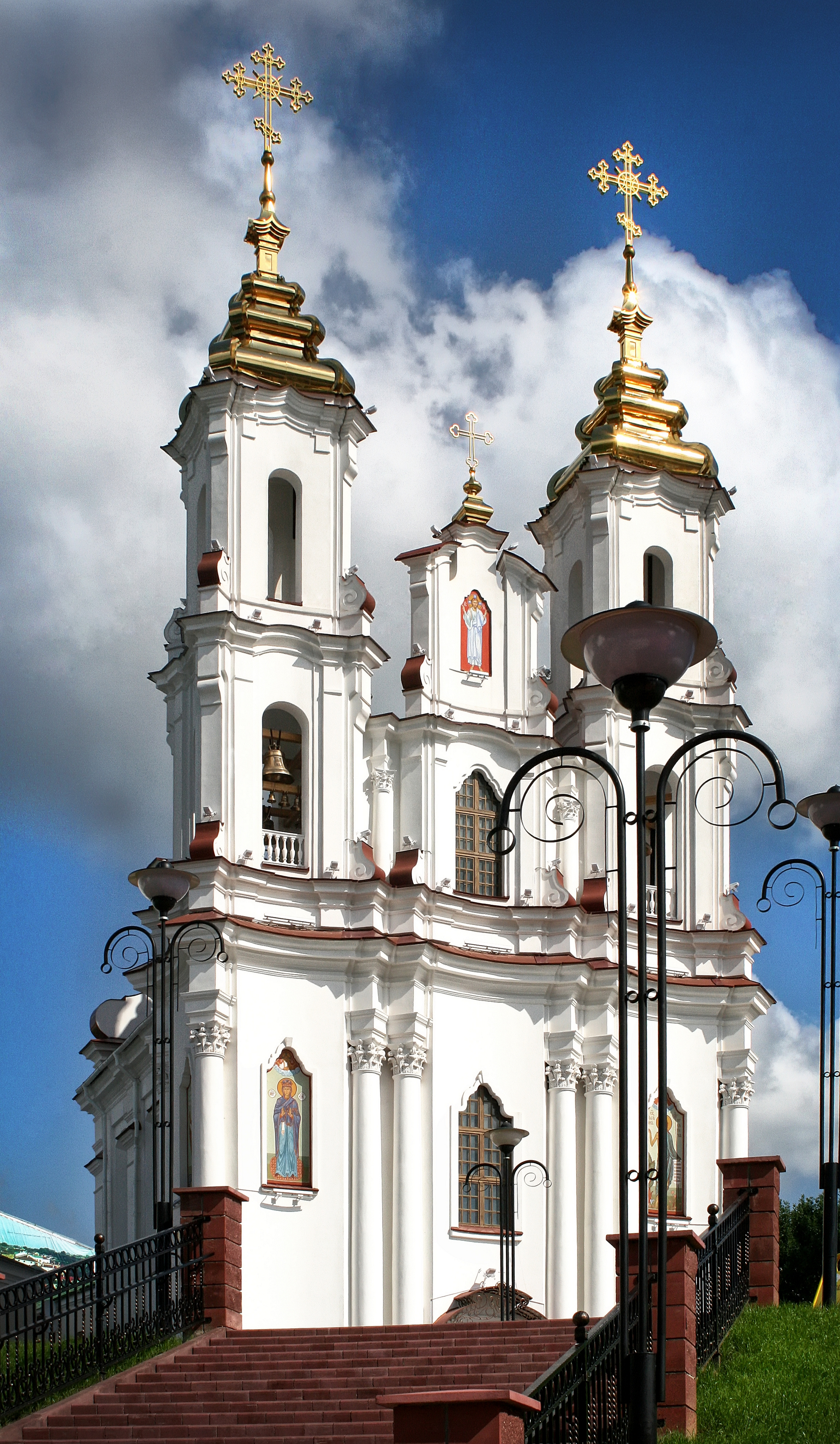
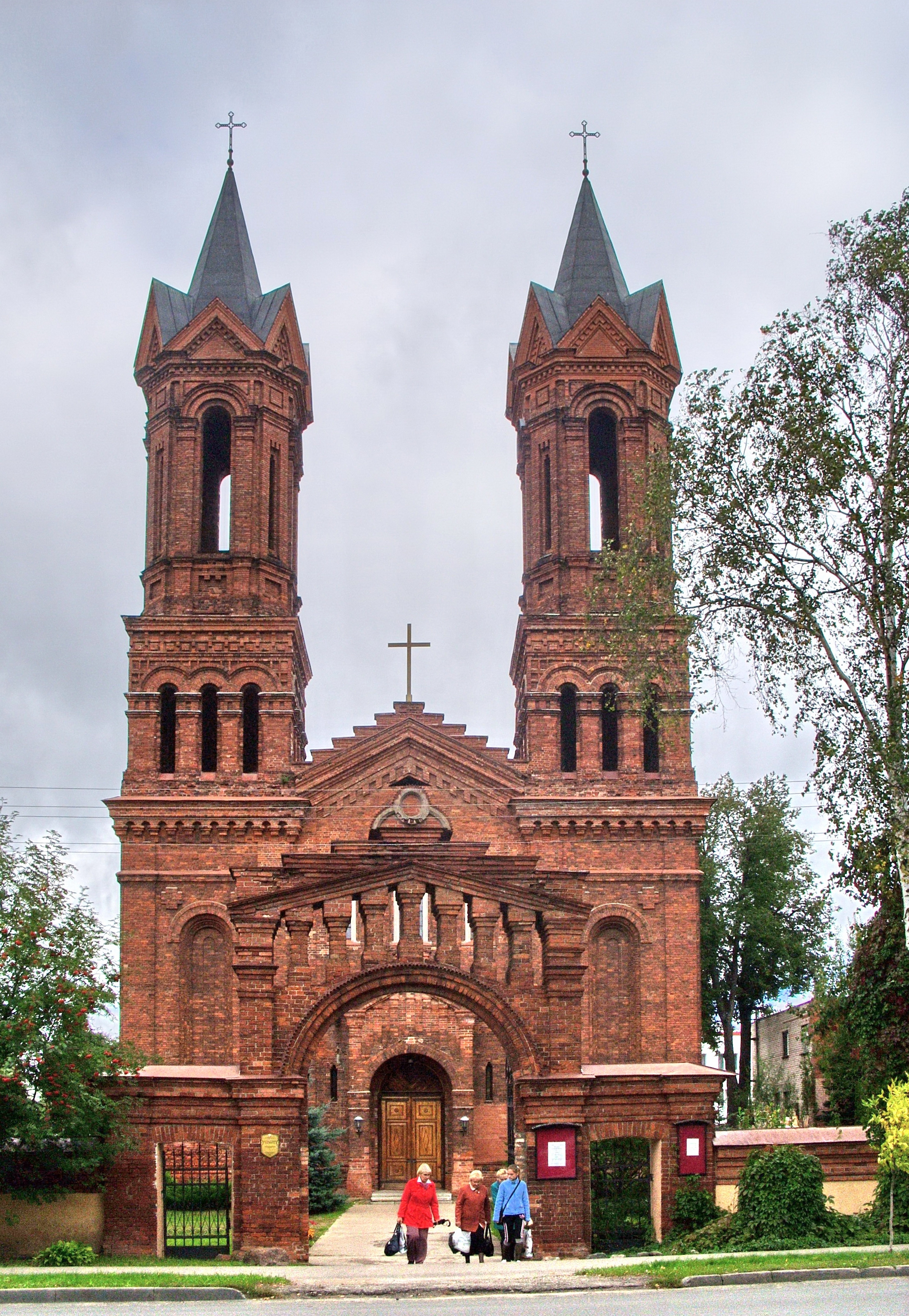
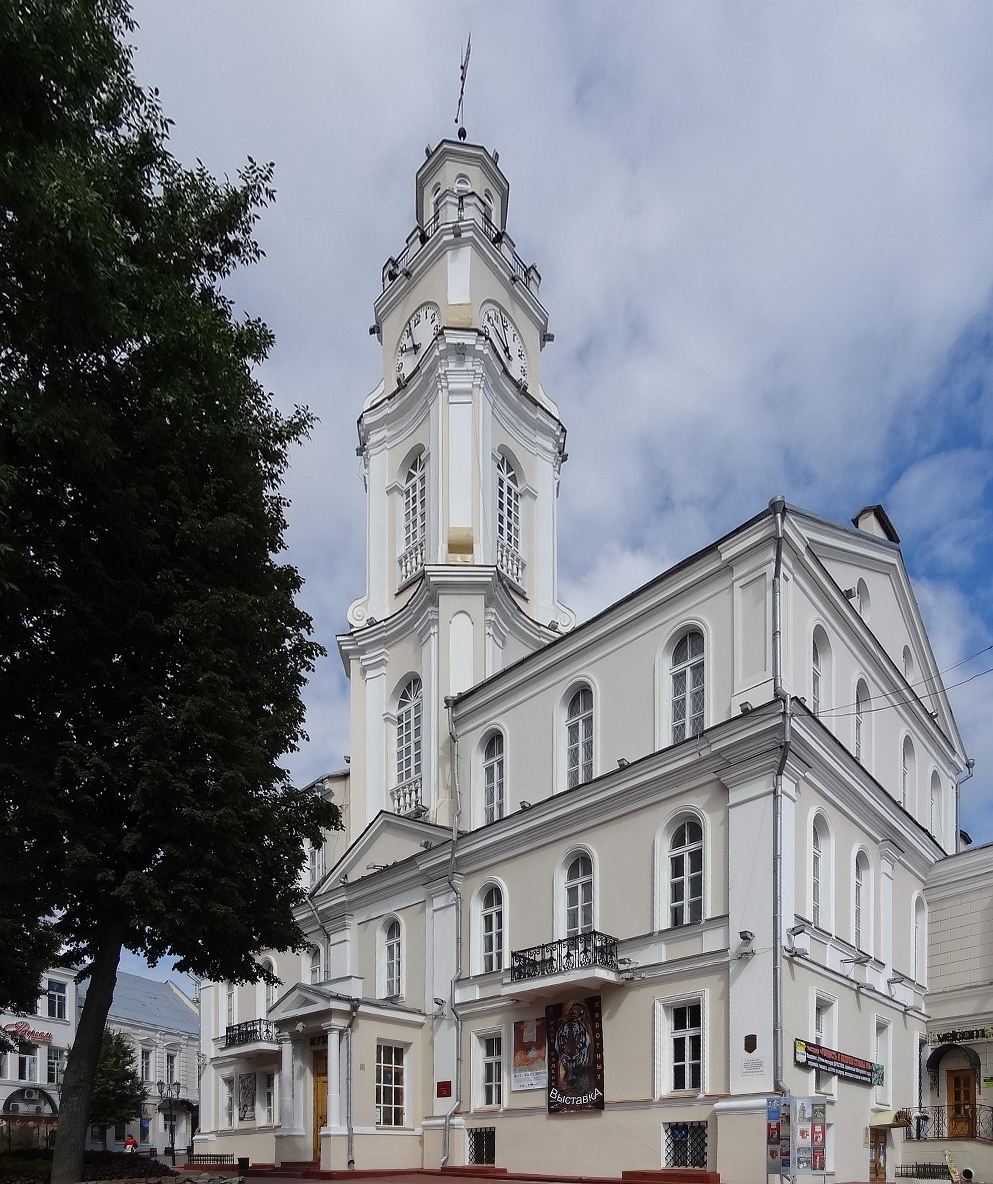
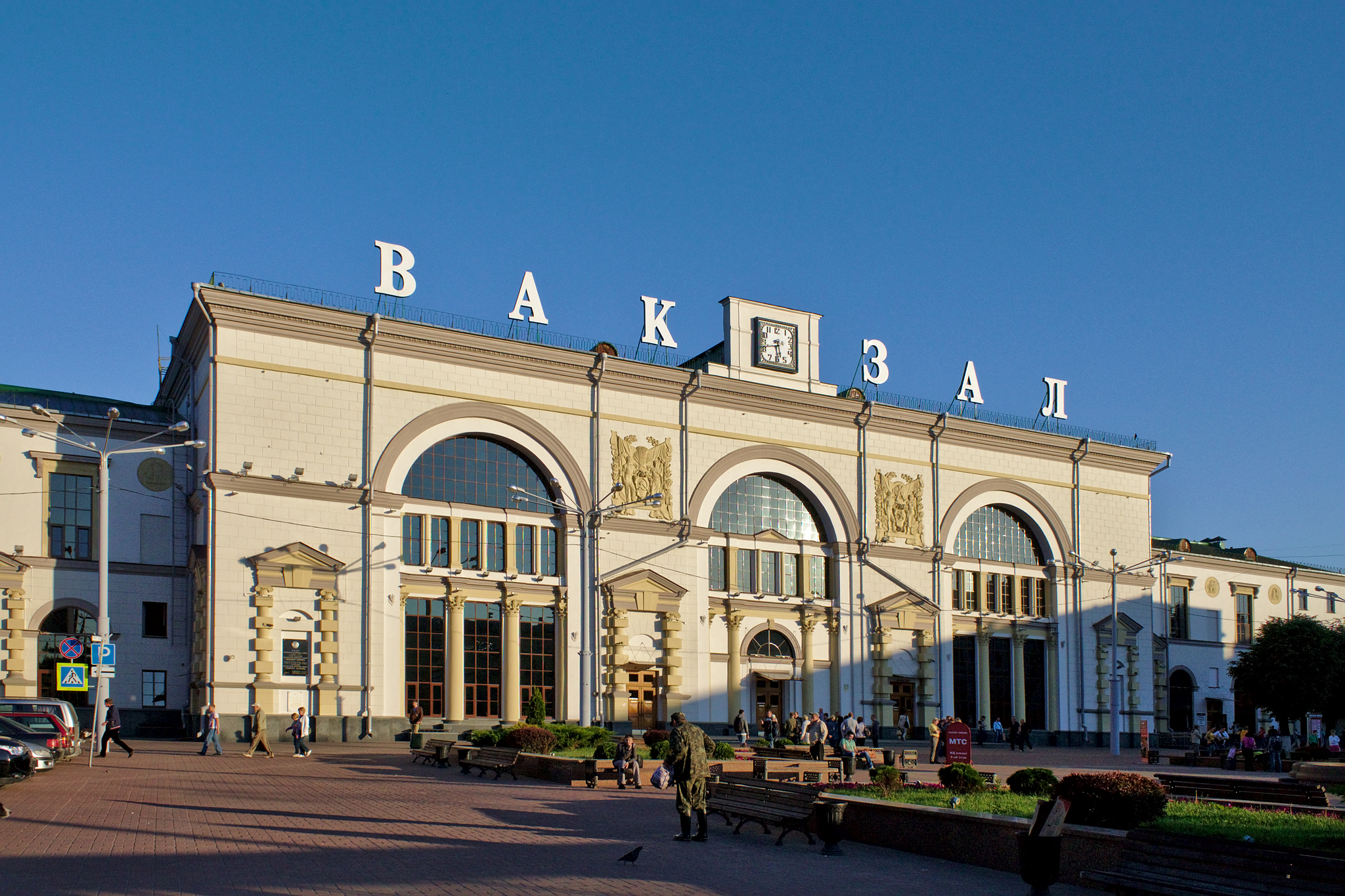
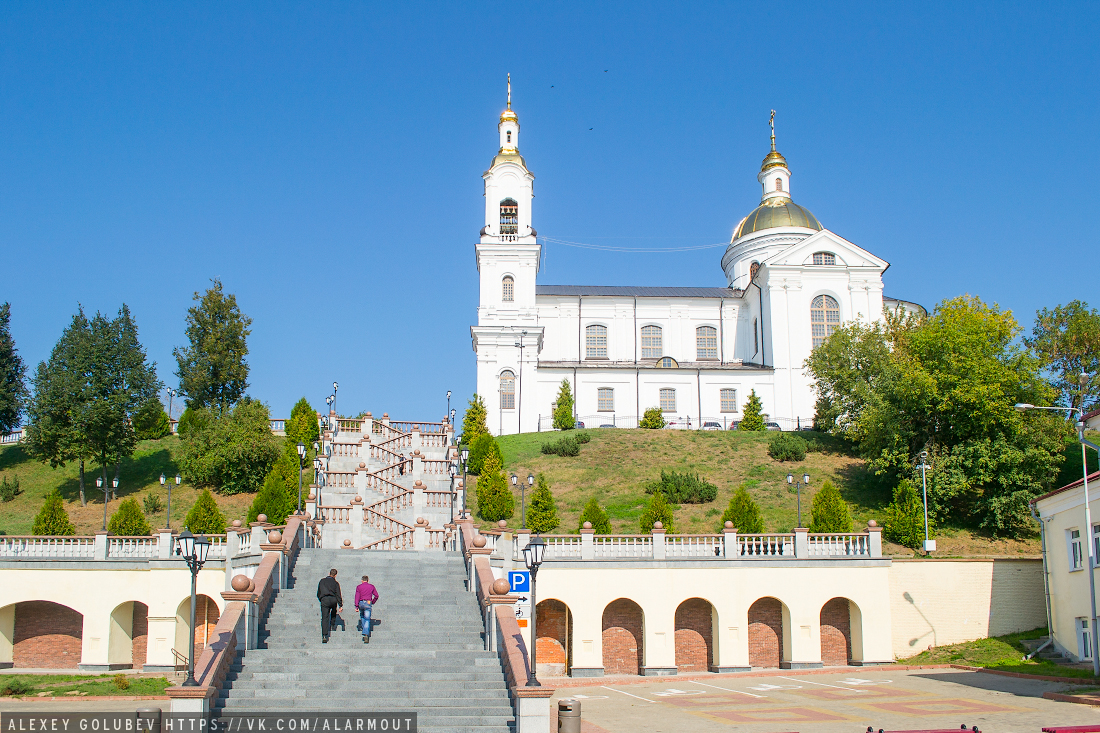
- Suvorava Street Resurrection Church St. Barbara Church Town Hall Main railway station Church of the Assumption

- Flag Coat of arms
- Interactive map of Vitebsk
- Location within Belarus Location within Europe
- Coordinates: 55°11′30″N 30°12′20″E
- Country: Belarus
- Region: Vitebsk Region
- Founded: 974

Government
  - Chairman: Nikolay Orlov

Area
  - City: 124.54 km^{2} (48.09 sq mi)
- Elevation: 172 m (564 ft)

Population (2025)
  - Urban: 358,927
- Time zone: UTC+3 (MSK)
- Postal code: 210000
- Area code: +375-212
- License plate: 2
- Website: Official website

Vitebsk or Vitsyebsk (Note: Belarusian: Віцебск, romanized: Viciebsk, IPA: [ˈvʲitsʲepsk]; Russian: Витебск, IPA: [ˈvʲitʲɪpsk]; Yiddish: וויטעבסק.) is a city in north-eastern Belarus. It serves as the administrative center of Vitebsk Region and Vitebsk District, though it is administratively separated from the district. As of 2025, it has 358,927 inhabitants, making it the country's fourth-largest city. It is served by Vitebsk Vostochny Airport and Vitebsk Air Base.

== History ==
=== Middle Ages ===
Vitebsk developed from a river harbor where the Vitba River (from which it derives its name) flows into the larger Western Dvina, which is spanned in the city by the Kirov Bridge. The name of the river is said to be derived from vit (lit. 'swamp' or 'wet place').

Archaeological research indicates that Baltic tribes had settlements at the mouth of Vitba. In the 9th century, Slavic settlements of the tribal union of the Krivichs replaced them. According to the Chronicle of Michael Brigandine (1760), Princess Olga of Kiev founded Vitebsk (also recorded as Dbesk, Vidbesk, Videbsk, Vitepesk, or Vicibesk) in 974. Other versions give 947 or 914. Academician Boris Rybakov and historian Leonid Alekseyev have come to the conclusion, based on the chronicles, that Princess Olga of Kiev could have established Vitebsk in 947. Leonid Alekseyev suggested that the chroniclers, when transferring the date from the account of the Byzantine era (since the creation of the world) to a new era, obtained the year 947, later mistakenly written in copying manuscripts as 974. It was an important place on the trade route from the Varangians to the Greeks. By the end of the 12th century, Vitebsk became a center of trade and commerce, and the center of an independent principality, following the Polotsk, and at times, the Smolensk and Kiev princes.

The official year of the founding of Vitebsk is 974, based on an anachronistic legend of founding by Olga of Kiev, but the first mention in historical records dates from 1021, when Yaroslav the Wise of Kiev gave it to Bryachislav Izyaslavich, Prince of Polotsk.

In the 12th and 13th centuries, Vitebsk functioned as the capital of the Principality of Vitebsk, an appanage principality which thrived at the crossroads of the river routes between the Baltic and Black seas. In 1320 the city was incorporated into the Grand Duchy of Lithuania as dowry of the Princess Maria, the first wife of Grand Duke of Lithuania Algirdas. By 1351 the city had erected a stone Upper and Lower Castle, the prince's palace. In 1410 Vitebsk participated in the Battle of Grunwald.

=== Modern era ===
From 1503 it was the capital of the Vitebsk Voivodeship. In 1569 it became part of the Polish–Lithuanian Commonwealth. In 1597 Vitebsk was granted Magdeburg rights and a coat of arms by Sigismund III Vasa. However, the rights were taken away in 1623 after the citizens revolted against the imposed Union of Brest and killed Archbishop Josaphat Kuntsevych of Polotsk. In 1641 Władysław IV Vasa restored Magdeburg rights. The city was almost completely destroyed by the Russians in 1654, during the Russo-Polish War, and in 1708, during the Great Northern War. In the First Partition of Poland in 1772, the Russian Empire annexed Vitebsk.

The town once had three castles: the Upper Castle, which housed the voivode's palace, the Lower Castle, and the Uzgorski Castle. The first two were destroyed by fire in 1614 but were later rebuilt; however, by the 19th century, none of the castles remained. In addition to raids, Vitebsk was frequently struck by fires—in the years 1335, 1614, 1629, 1680, 1698, 1707, 1733, 1752, 1757, and 1762.

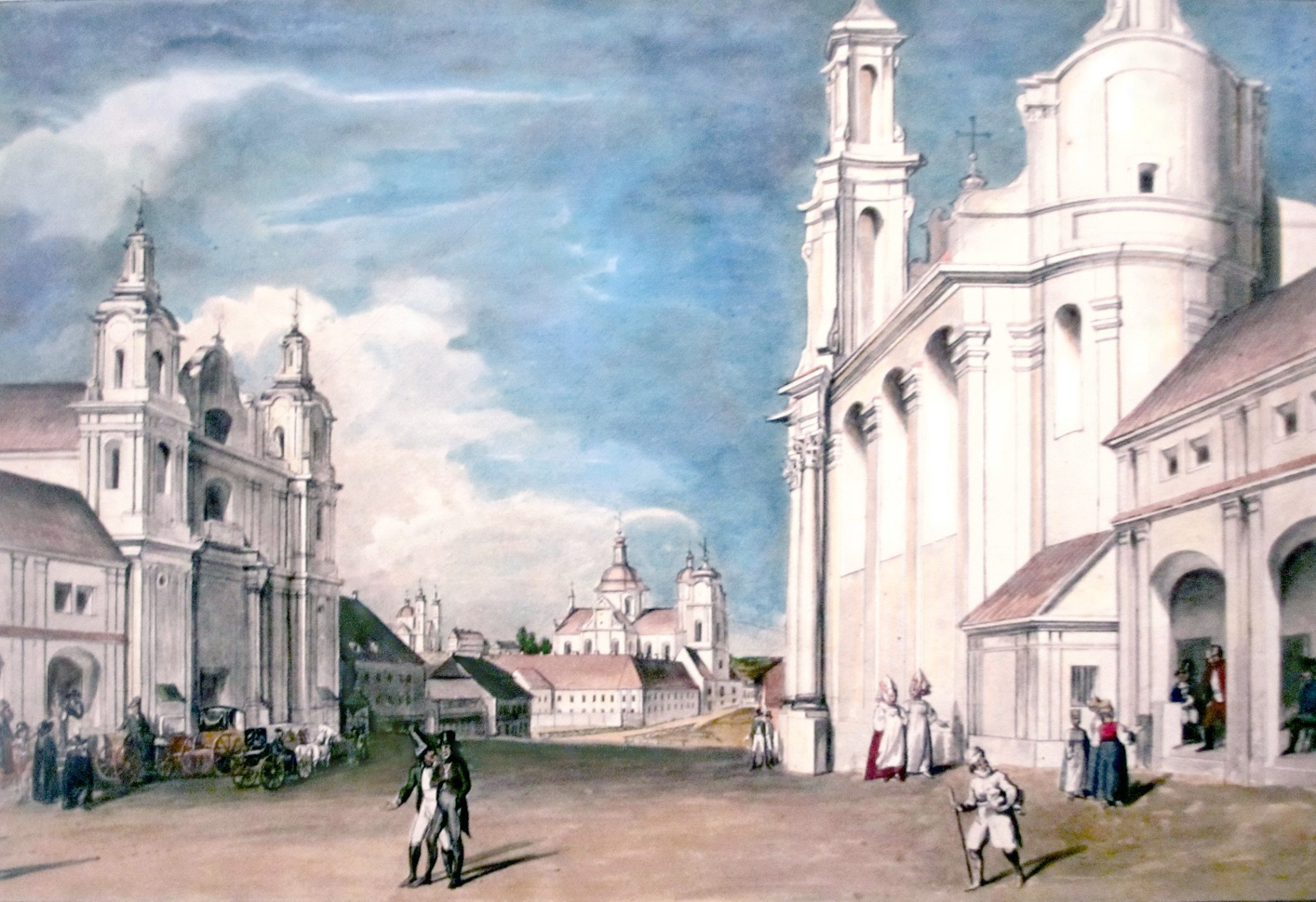
View of Vitebsk in the early 19th century by Józef Peszka

Under the Russian Empire, the historic centre of Vitebsk was rebuilt in the Neoclassical style.

The Battle of Vitebsk was fought west of the city on 26–27 July 1812 as Napoleon attempted to engage decisively with the Russian army. While the French were to occupy the town for over three months (the emperor celebrating his 43rd birthday there) the Russian army was able to slip away with minimal losses towards Smolensk.

Before World War II, Vitebsk had a significant Jewish population: according to Russian census of 1897, out of the total population of 65,900, Jews constituted 34,400 (around 52%). The most famous of its Jewish natives was the painter Marc Chagall (1887-1985).

In 1919, Vitebsk was proclaimed to be part of the Socialist Soviet Republic of Byelorussia (January to February 1919), but was soon transferred to the Russian Soviet Federative Socialist Republic and later to the short-lived Lithuanian–Byelorussian Soviet Socialist Republic (February to July 1919). In 1924 it was returned to the Byelorussian Soviet Socialist Republic.

=== World War II ===
The headquarters of the Soviet 3rd Army was based in Vitebsk shortly before the Soviet invasion of Poland at the start of World War II in September 1939. The 3rd Army attacked towards Święciany and Wilno.

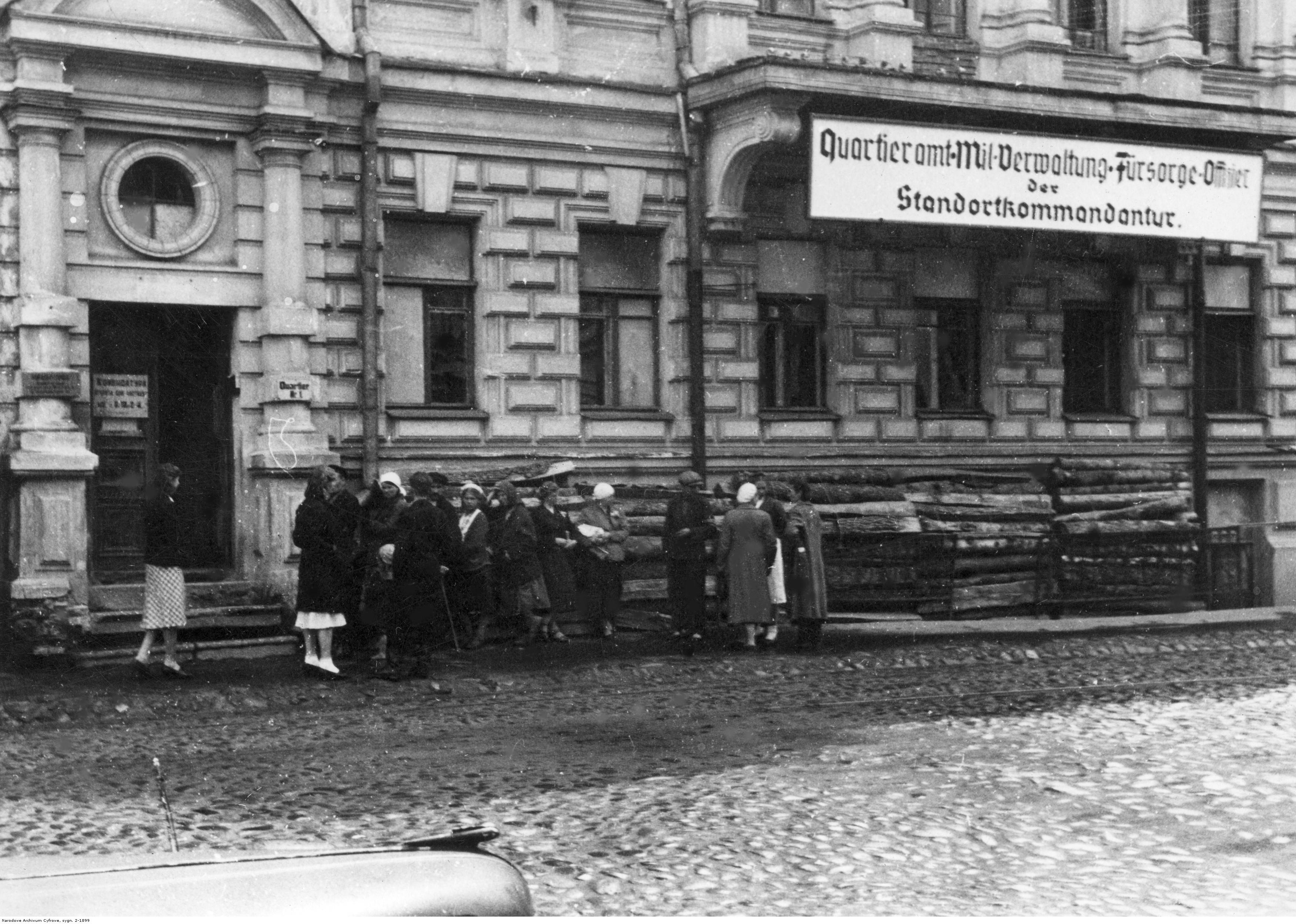
Vitebsk in 1943, during the period of Nazi German occupation

During the war, the city came under Nazi German occupation (11 July 1941 – 26 June 1944).

During Operation Barbarossa, 22,000 Jews, or 58% of Vitebsk's Jewish population, managed to successfully evacuate to the interior of the Soviet Union, thus saving themselves from the impending Holocaust. Much of the old city was destroyed in the ensuing battles between the Germans and Red Army soldiers. Most of the remaining local Jews perished in the Vitebsk Ghetto massacre of October 1941. The Germans also operated a Nazi prison, the Stalag 313 prisoner-of-war camp and forced labour camps in the city.. The exact number of Jewish victims is not known, but the estimates range from 8,000 to 13,000.

The Soviets recaptured the city during the June 1944 Vitebsk–Orsha Offensive, as part of Operation Bagration.

=== Post-war period ===
In the first postwar five-year period the city was rebuilt. Its industrial complex covered machinery, light industry, and machine tools.

In 1959, a TV tower was commissioned and started broadcasting the 1st Central Television program.

In 1990, a club of voters "For Democratic Elections" was founded in Vitebsk.

=== Independence of Belarus ===
In January 1991, Vitebsk celebrated the first Marc Chagall Festival. In June 1992, a monument to Chagall was erected on his native Pokrovskaja Street and a memorial inscription was placed on the wall of his house.

Since 1992, Vitebsk has been hosting the annual Slavianski Bazaar, an international music festival. The main participants are artists from Russia, Belarus and Ukraine, with guests from many other countries, both Slavic and non-Slavic. There has been a remarkable improvement and expansion of the city. The central stadium was reconstructed, and the Summer Amphitheatre, the railway station and other historical sites and facilities were restored, and the Ice Sports Palace along with a number of new churches and other public facilities were built, together with the construction of new residential areas.

== Attractions ==
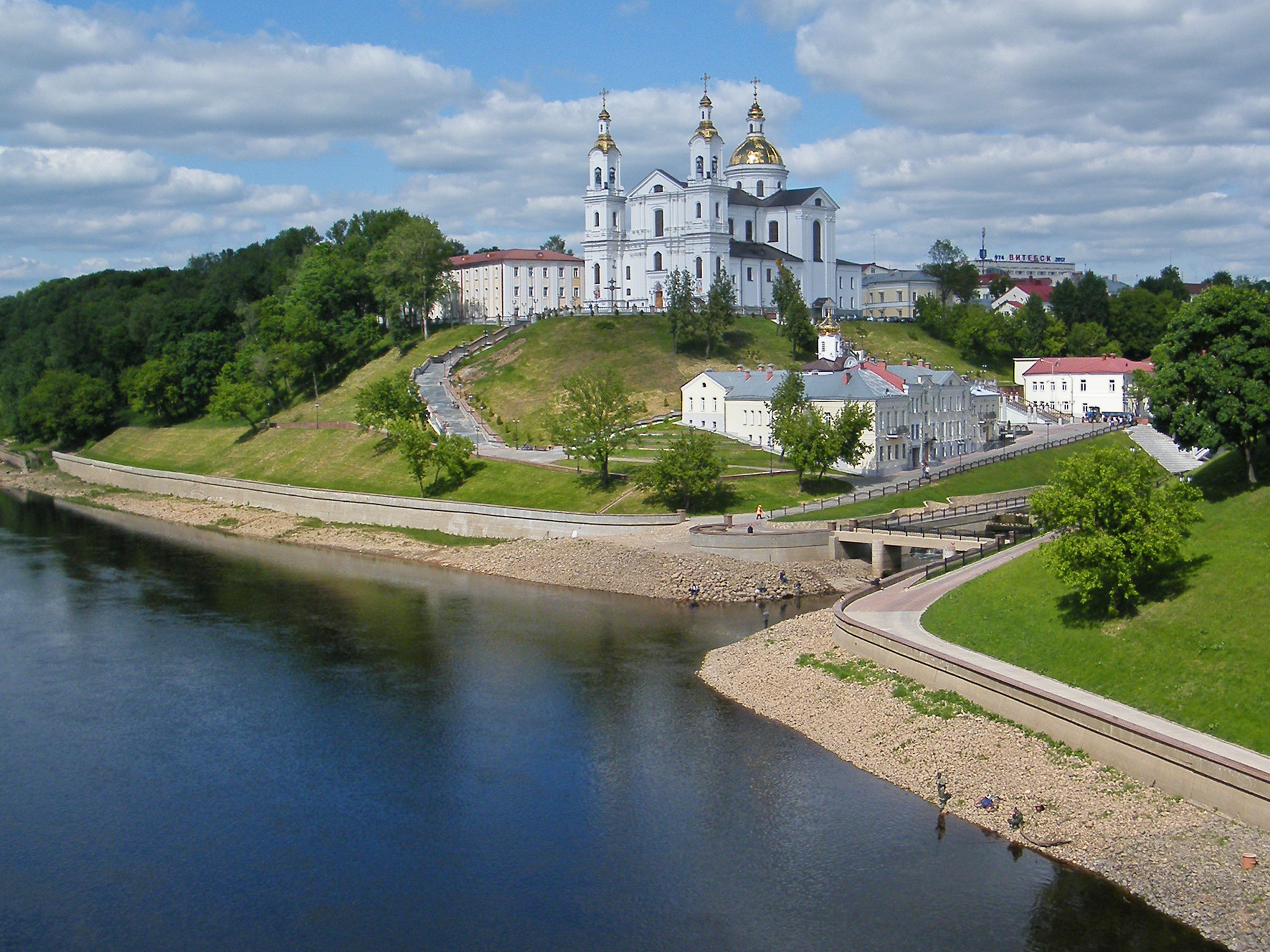
Vilnian Baroque Church of the Assumption and monastery

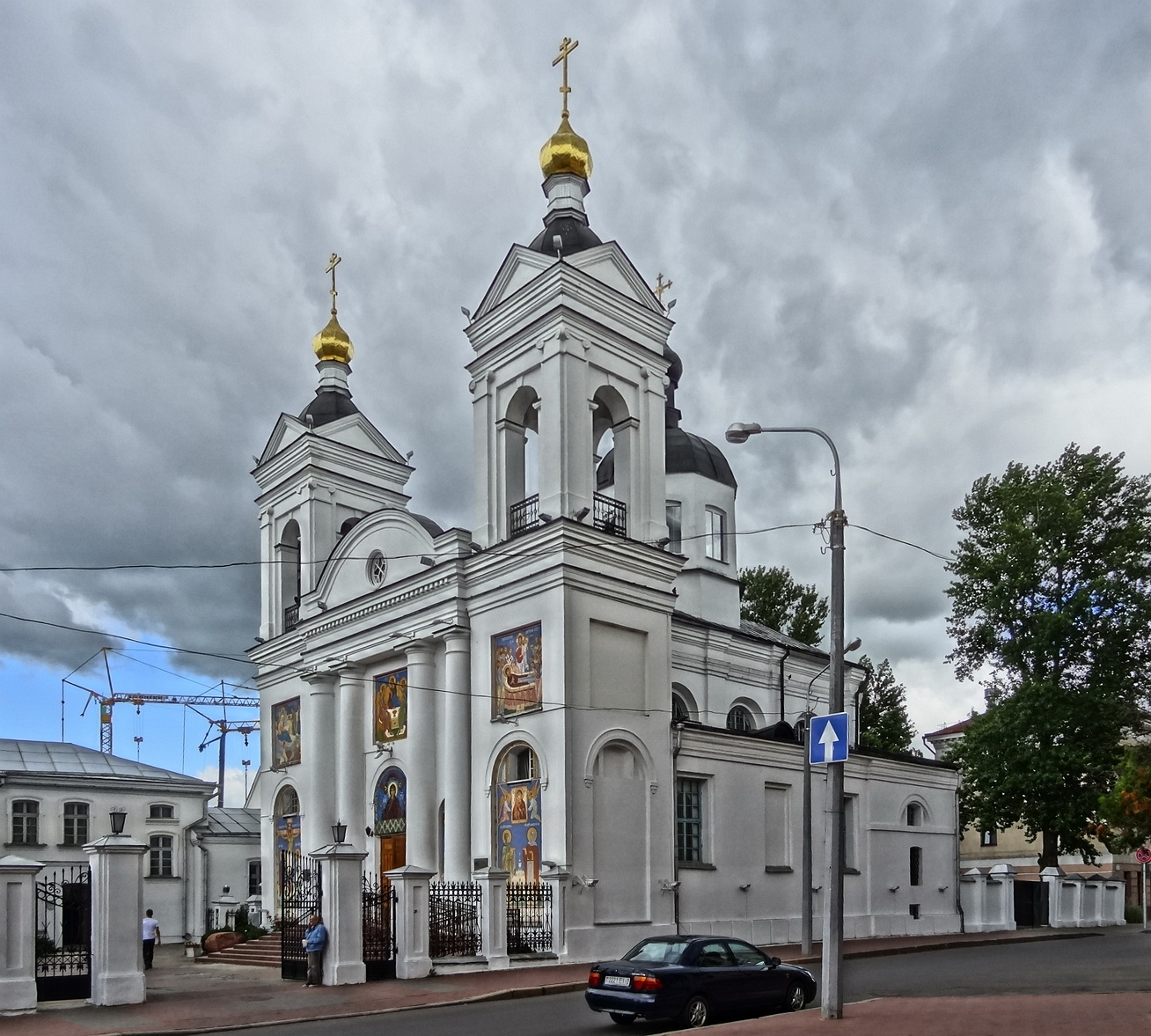
Cathedral of the Blessed Virgin Mary

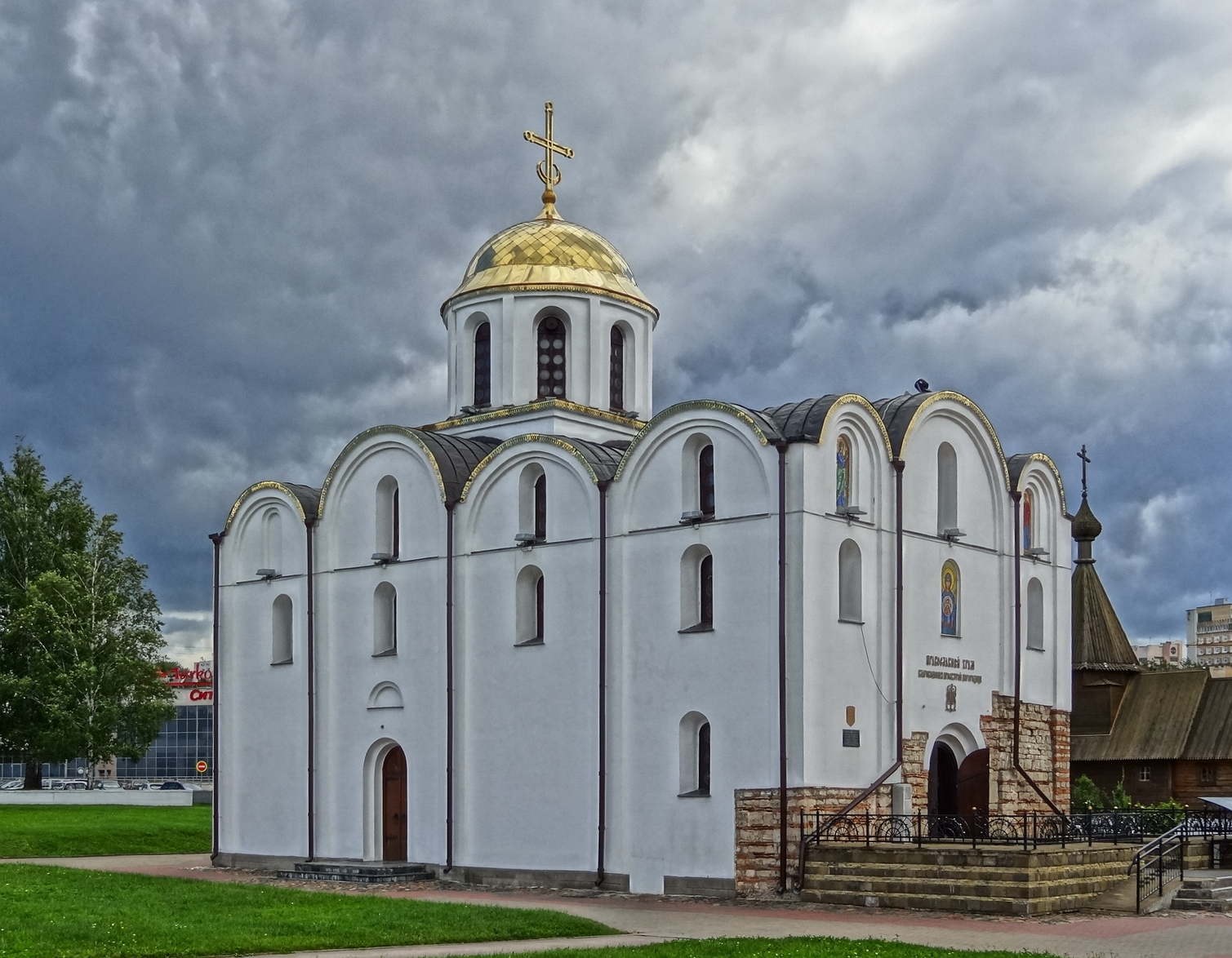
Annunciation Church

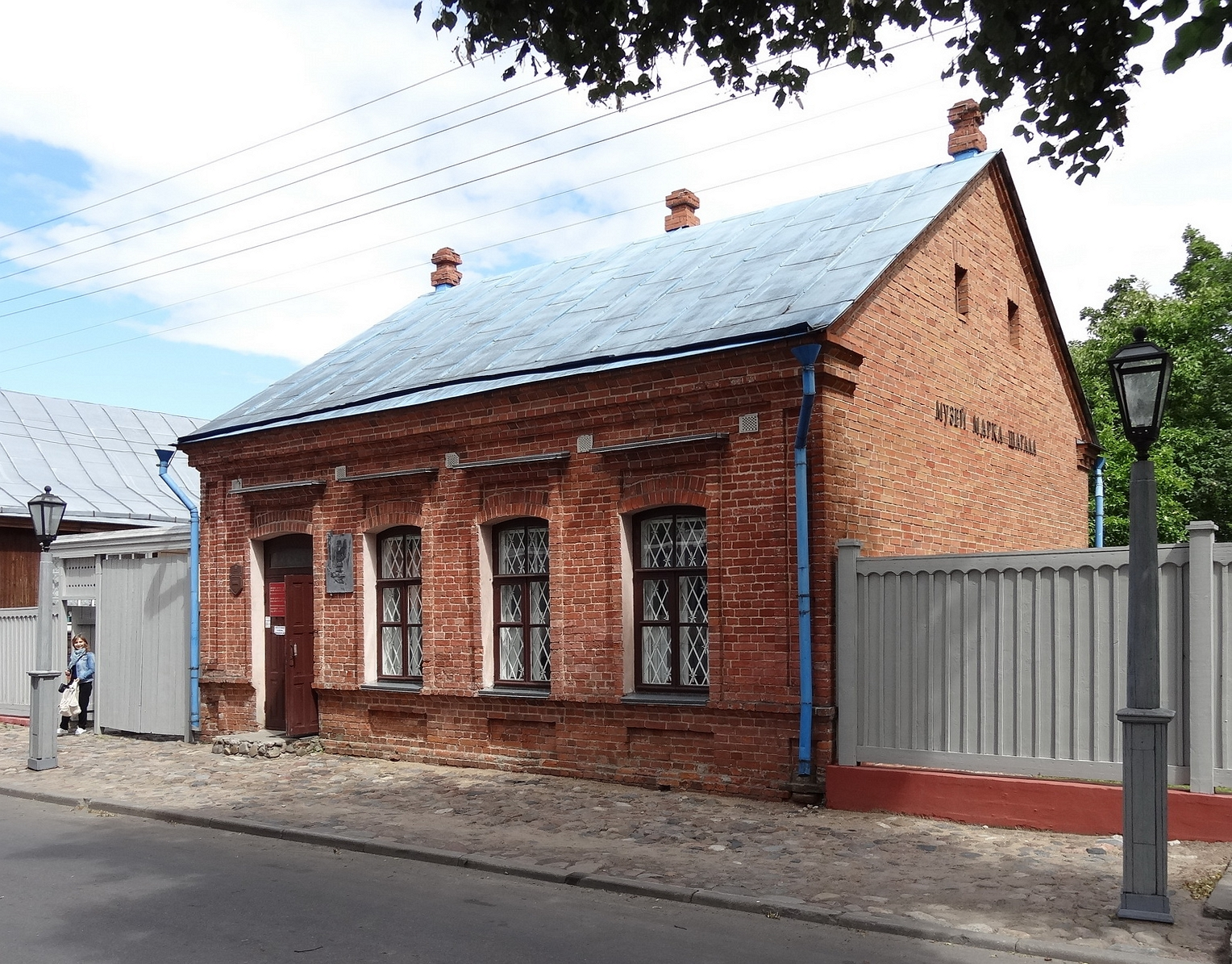
Marc Chagall Museum

The city has one of the oldest buildings in the country, the Annunciation Church, an Orthodox church built in the first half of the 12th century, when Vitebsk was part of the Polotsk land. It was the work of visiting masters rather than the local Polotsk builders, probably invited after a group of Polotsk princes returned from exile in Byzantium in 1140.

In 1619 the church was transferred to the Uniates. It was rebuilt in the late Baroque style in 1759 and returned to the Orthodox Church in the early 1830s. Partly destroyed during the Second World War, it was blown up in December 1961 by decision of the city authorities. The ruins were conserved in 1977, and between 1992 and 1998 the church was rebuilt in its 12th-century form to a design by the architect G. A. Lavretsky. (Note: The Annunciation Church is a six-pillared building with one apse. It is built of hewn limestone quadras, each row being separated by two rows of brick, covered with a thin layer of stucco so as to emulate large blocks of stone. This technique was widespread in Byzantium; but there are only two examples north of Crimea — one in Vitebsk and another, unfinished and long ruined church in Navahrudak, probably by the same team of Byzantine builders. Another extraordinary feature of the church is that its bays are equal and the central nave is square in plan. The choir gallery occupies the western bay; it adjoins two secluded chapels over the lateral aisles. Stairs leading to the gallery are built into the western wall.)

Churches from the Polish-Lithuanian period were likewise destroyed, although the Resurrection Church (1772–77) has been rebuilt. The Orthodox cathedral, dedicated to the Intercession of the Theotokos, was erected in 1760. There are also the town hall (1775); the Russian governor's palace, where Napoleon celebrated his 43rd birthday in 1812; the Neo-Romanesque Roman Catholic cathedral (1884–85); and an obelisk commemorating the centenary of the Russian victory over Napoleon.

Vitebsk is also home to a lattice steel TV tower carrying a horizontal cross on which the antenna mast is guyed. This tower, which is nearly identical to that at Grodno, but a few metres shorter (245 metres in Vitebsk versus 254 metres at Grodno) was completed in 1983. The city is also home to the Marc Chagall Museum and the Vitebsk regional museum.

== Geography ==
=== Climate ===
Vitebsk has warm summer humid continental climate, Köppen: Dfb, Trewartha: Dcbo. Summers are generally warm, while winters are relatively cold but still warmer than in Moscow due to a stronger influence of maritime air from the Baltic Sea. Approximately 724 mm (28.5 in) of precipitation falls here per annum.

Climate data for Vitebsk (1991–2020, extremes 1886–present)
Month	Jan	Feb	Mar	Apr	May	Jun	Jul	Aug	Sep	Oct	Nov	Dec	Year
Record high °C (°F)	10.4 (50.7)	10.9 (51.6)	23.1 (73.6)	28.5 (83.3)	32.5 (90.5)	35.4 (95.7)	34.7 (94.5)	37.8 (100.0)	30.1 (86.2)	24.6 (76.3)	14.9 (58.8)	10.7 (51.3)	37.8 (100.0)
Mean daily maximum °C (°F)	−2.7 (27.1)	−1.8 (28.8)	3.7 (38.7)	12.0 (53.6)	18.7 (65.7)	22.2 (72.0)	24.2 (75.6)	23.1 (73.6)	17.1 (62.8)	9.7 (49.5)	2.7 (36.9)	−1.3 (29.7)	10.6 (51.1)
Daily mean °C (°F)	−5.0 (23.0)	−4.7 (23.5)	0.0 (32.0)	7.2 (45.0)	13.3 (55.9)	17.0 (62.6)	19.0 (66.2)	17.7 (63.9)	12.3 (54.1)	6.3 (43.3)	0.7 (33.3)	−3.2 (26.2)	6.7 (44.1)
Mean daily minimum °C (°F)	−7.2 (19.0)	−7.4 (18.7)	−3.3 (26.1)	2.7 (36.9)	8.1 (46.6)	12.1 (53.8)	14.2 (57.6)	13.0 (55.4)	8.3 (46.9)	3.6 (38.5)	−1.2 (29.8)	−5.2 (22.6)	3.1 (37.6)
Record low °C (°F)	−40.6 (−41.1)	−38.4 (−37.1)	−29.7 (−21.5)	−17.5 (0.5)	−4.4 (24.1)	−1.6 (29.1)	3.8 (38.8)	0.2 (32.4)	−4.9 (23.2)	−15.0 (5.0)	−24.0 (−11.2)	−34.6 (−30.3)	−40.6 (−41.1)
Average precipitation mm (inches)	57 (2.2)	49 (1.9)	44 (1.7)	39 (1.5)	63 (2.5)	76 (3.0)	93 (3.7)	77 (3.0)	63 (2.5)	67 (2.6)	59 (2.3)	57 (2.2)	744 (29.3)
Average extreme snow depth cm (inches)	15 (5.9)	19 (7.5)	14 (5.5)	0 (0)	0 (0)	0 (0)	0 (0)	0 (0)	0 (0)	0 (0)	2 (0.8)	9 (3.5)	19 (7.5)
Average rainy days	8	6	9	13	16	17	17	14	16	17	14	10	157
Average snowy days	23	21	14	4	0.3	0	0	0	0.2	3	13	22	101
Average relative humidity (%)	85	81	76	67	66	72	73	75	80	83	87	87	78
Source: Pogoda.ru.net

== Demographics ==
Historical population

Year	Pop.	±%
1897	65,871	—
1923	86,641	+31.5%
1926	91,201	+5.3%
1939	167,299	+83.4%
1959	148,300	−11.4%
1970	230,804	+55.6%
1979	296,605	+28.5%

Year	Pop.	±%
1989	350,004	+18.0%
1999	340,700	−2.7%
2009	347,928	+2.1%
2019	364,674	+4.8%
2023	359,148	−1.5%
2024	358,395	−0.2%
2025	358,927	+0.1%

Source: pop-stat.mashke.org

== Education ==
The main universities of Vitebsk are Vitebsk State Technological University, Vitebsk State Medical University and Vitebsk State University named in honor of Pyotr Masherov.

== Sport ==
HK Vitebsk of the Belarusian Extraleague is the local professional hockey team.

== Twin towns – sister cities ==
Vitebsk is twinned with:

- Astrakhan, Russia
- Bălți, Moldova
- Beloyarsky District, Russia
- Daugavpils, Latvia
- Gelendzhik, Russia
- Harbin, China
- Irkutsk, Russia
- Jinan, China
- Lipetsk, Russia
- Nienburg, Germany
- Niš, Serbia
- Pskov, Russia
- Rēzekne, Latvia
- Smolensk, Russia
- Vanadzor, Armenia

The city was previously twinned with:

- Zielona Góra, Poland
- Frankfurt an der Oder, Germany
- Panevėžys, Lithuania

== Notable people ==
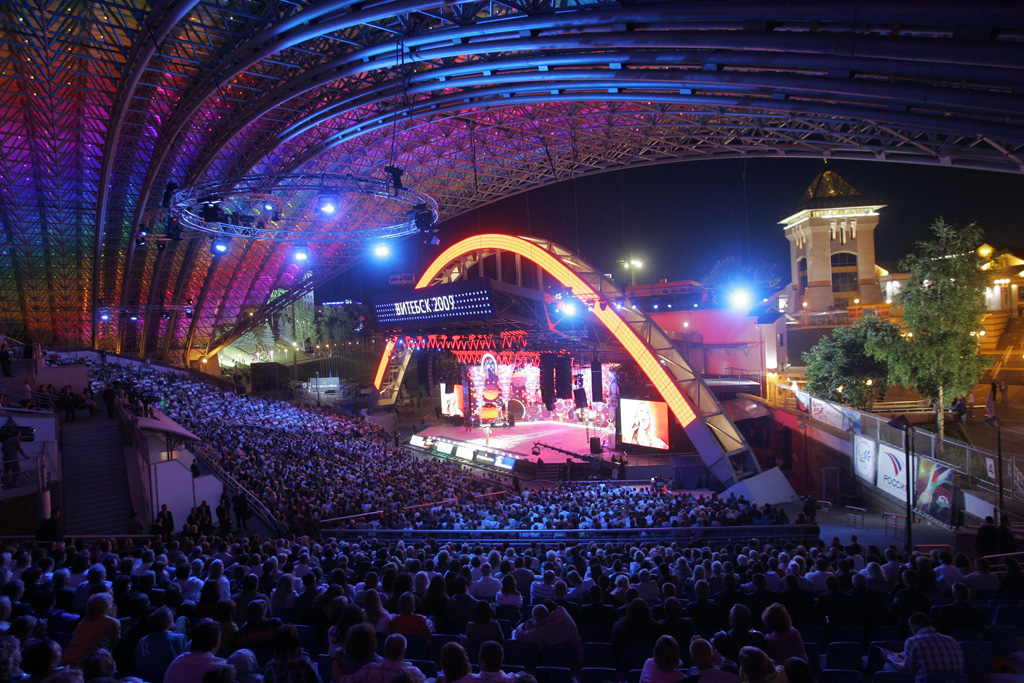
Slavianski Bazaar in Vitebsk, 2009

- Zhores Alferov (1930–2019), physicist, 2000 Nobel Prize Winner for Physics
- S. Ansky (1863–1920), playwright (The Dybbuk)
- Anatol Bahatyroǔ (Anatoly Bogatyrev) (1913–2003), Belarusian composer
- Vladimir Bourmeister (1904–1971), ballet choreographer
- Marc Chagall (1887–1985), artist
- Sam Dolgoff (1902–1990), anarcho-syndicalist housepainter
- Tanya Dziahileva (born 1991), model
- Mark Fradkin (1914–1990), composer
- Leon Gaspard (1882–1964), artist
- Joseph Günzburg (1812–1878), Russian financier and philanthropist
- Isser Harel (1912–2003), Israeli intelligence chief
- Lazar Khidekel (1904–1986), artist, architect
- Franciszek Dionizy Kniaźnin (1750–1807), poet and collector of Belarusian folklore
- Tomasz Bohdanowicz-Dworzecki (1859-1920), architect
- Leon Kobrin (1873–1946), playwright
- Marcelo Koc (1918–2006), Argentinian composer
- Anna Kogan (1902–1974), Soviet artist
- Sergei Kornilenko (born 1983), footballer
- Lazar Lagin (1903–1979), writer
- El Lissitzky (1890–1941), artist
- Oleg Markov (born 1996), AFL premiership player
- Menachem Mendel of Vitebsk (1730?–1788), Hasidic Rebbe
- Anna Missuna (1868–1922), geologist
- Yehuda Pen (1854–1937), artist
- Aliaksei Protas (born 2001), National Hockey League ice hockey player for the Washington Capitals
- Kazimierz Siemienowicz (1600–1651), engineer, pioneer of rocketry
- Ivan Sollertinsky (1902–1944), polymath, critic, and musicologist
- Joseph Solman (1909–2008), American painter
- Simeon Strunsky (1879–1948), author in New York City
- Immanuel Velikovsky (1895–1979), psychiatrist/psychoanalyst and author
- Alexander Vvedensky (1889–1946), one of the leaders of the Living Church movement

== Artistic tributes ==
In 1928, the American composer Aaron Copland composed the piano trio Vitebsk: Study on a Jewish Theme, and the work was premiered in 1929. Based on a Jewish folk song from S. Ansky's play The Dybbuk, Copland's piece is named for Vitebsk Governorate, where Ansky was born, and where he first heard the tune.

== Sources ==
- Shishanov V. A. (2007). Vitebsk Museum of Modern Art: history of creation and collection. 1918–1941. Minsk: Medisont. p. 144. In Russian. eastview.com
- Любезный мне город Витебск.... Мемуары и документы. Конец XVIII — начало XIX в. / Вступ. ст., науч., коммент., сост., публ. В. А. Шишанова. Мн.: Асобны Дах, 2005. 40 с.
- Шишанов В. 947 или 914? // Витебский проспект. 2005. No.45. 10 нояб. С.3.
- Изобразительное искусство Витебска 1918 – 1923 гг. в местной периодической печати : библиограф. указ. и тексты публ. / сост. В. А. Шишанов. – Минск : Медисонт, 2010. – 264 с.
