= Kirovske (air base) =

Russian air base

Kirovske / Kirovs'ke / Kirovskoye Goncharovka (pre 1953)
- Kirovske, Crimea in Ukraine
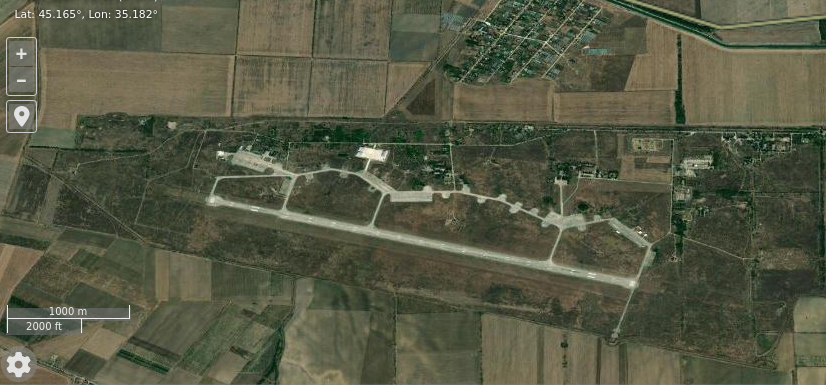
- Satellite imagery of Kirovske air base

Site information
- Type: Air Base
- Operator: Russian Aerospace Forces

Location
- Location within Crimea Location within Ukraine
- Coordinates: 45°09′55″N 35°10′55″E

Site history
- Built: 1950
- In use: 1950 – present

Airfield information
- Identifiers: ICAO: URFJ
- Elevation: 53 metres (174 ft) AMSL
Runways
| Direction | Length and surface |
|---|---|
| 10/28 | 3,000 metres (9,843 ft) Concrete |

Kirovske (in US intelligence, Kirovskoye) (Russian: Кировское; Ukrainian: Кіровське) is a Russian Aerospace Forces base located in Kirovske Raion, near the town of Kirovske, in Russian occupied Crimea, Ukraine.

== History ==
The base is home to a detachment of the 929th State Flight Test Centre named for V. P. Chkalov.

Kirovske was the primary anti-submarine warfare (ASW) test and development center for Soviet Naval Aviation, and it worked closely with the flight test center at Akhtubinsk.

An interceptor regiment, the 136 IAP (136th Fighter Aviation Regiment) at Kirovske operated the Sukhoi Su-9 (ASCC: Fishpot) in the 1960s and 1970s. These were last seen at Kirovske in August 1979 before the runway was closed for expansion in the early 1980s. Other aircraft such as the Mikoyan-Gurevich MiG-15 (ASCC: Fresco) and Sukhoi Su-7 (ASCC: Fitter) were known to be present at Kirovske in the 1970s.

The base was used by the 326th Fighter Aviation Regiment between 1950 and 1979.

In April 2024, the UK's Ministry of Defence (MoD) reported that Kirovske had Su-30 fighter decoys painted on its hardstands and that at least a dozen more Russian air bases had painted similar decoys. The MoD believed the decoys were a reaction to Ukrainian attacks following the Russian invasion of Ukraine.

== See also ==
- List of military airbases in Russia
