= Kirovka =

Kirovka may refer to:

== Armenia ==
- Mamai, Armenia, formerly known as Kirovka

== Azerbaijan ==
- Günəşli, Bilasuvar, known as Kirovka until 2005
- Həsənsu, formerly known as Kirovka, Aghstafa District
- Nağaraxana, formerly known as Kirovka, Shamakhi District
- Yenikənd, Shamakhi, formerly known as Kirovka

== See also ==
- Kirov (disambiguation)
- Kirovsk (disambiguation)
- Kirovsky (disambiguation)
