= Kurov (surname) =

Kurov (Russian: Куров) is a Russian male surname, its feminine counterpart is Kurova. Notable people with the surname include:

- Nataliya Kurova (born 1962), Russian speed skater

== See also ==
- Kirov (surname)
