= Kirovski =

Kirovski (Macedonian: Кировски) is a Macedonian surname shared by the following people:

- Hristijan Kirovski (b. 1985), Macedonian association football player
- Jovan Kirovski (b. 1976), American association football player of Macedonian descent

== See also ==
- Kirov (disambiguation)
