= Kirovske, Crimea =

Kirovske / Isliam-Terek Іслям-Терек — Ислям-Терек — İslâm Terek
- Urban-type settlement
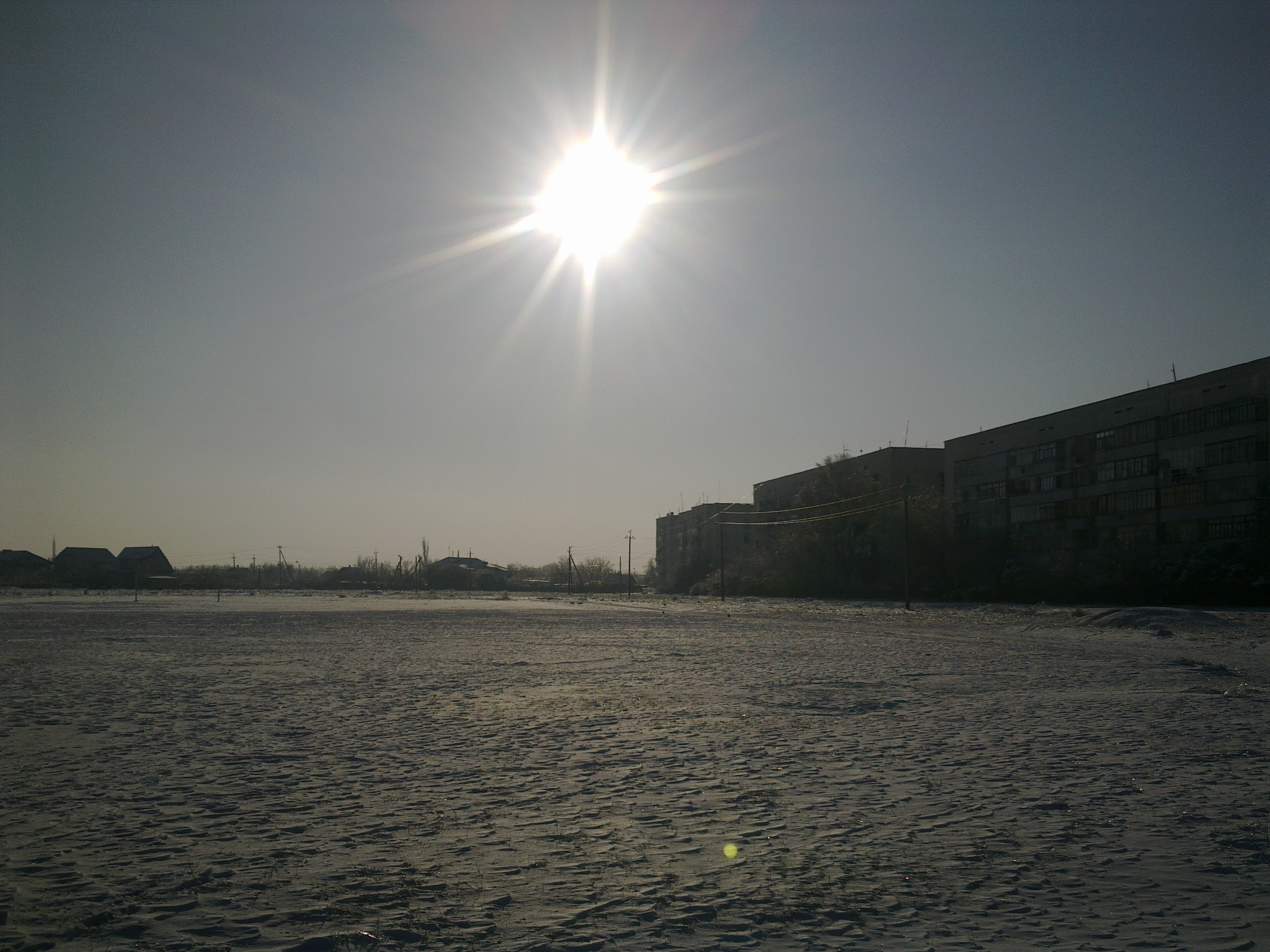

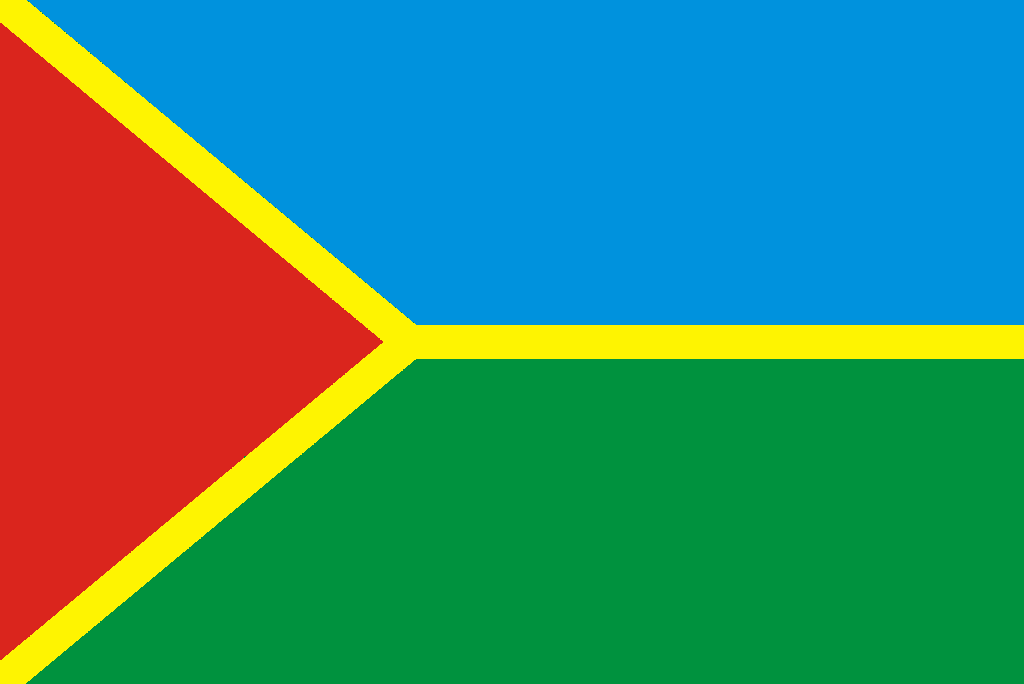
- Flag Coat of arms
- Interactive map of Kirovske / Isliam-Terek
- Location of Isliam-Terek in Crimea Kirovske / Isliam-Terek (Ukraine)
- Coordinates: 45°13′25″N 35°12′19″E
- Republic: Crimea
- District: Kirovske Raion
- First mentioned: 1783
- Town status: 1957

Government
  - Mayor: Aleksandr Evseyev

Area
  - Total: 5.99 km^{2} (2.31 sq mi)
- Elevation: 23 m (75 ft)

Population (2014)
  - Total: 6,883
  - Density: 1,150/km^{2} (2,980/sq mi)
- Time zone: UTC+4 (MSK)
- Postal code: 297300
- Area code: +7 365 55
- Climate: Cfa
- Website: http://rada.gov.ua/

Kirovske (Ukrainian: Кіровське; Russian: Кировское, romanized: Kirovskoye) or Isliam-Terek (Ukrainian: Іслям-Терек; Russian: Ислям-Терек; Crimean Tatar: İslâm Terek) is an urban-type settlement in the Crimea, a territory internationally recognized as part of Ukraine and occupied by Russia as the Republic of Crimea. Population: 6,883 (2014 Census).

Kirovske also serves as the administrative center of the Kirovske Raion (district), housing the district's local administration buildings.

A military air base, Kirovske, is located south of the town. It was used extensively by Soviet Naval Aviation and Soviet Air Defense Forces during the Cold War.

As of the 2001 Ukrainian Census, its population was 7,431.

== History ==
The first documentary mention of the village, originally known as İslâm Terek, is found in the Chamber Description of Crimea of the year 1784, according to which, during the final period of the Crimean Khanate, İslâm Terek was part of the Eski Qırım kadiluk of the Kefe Eyalet. After the annexation of the Crimean Khanate by the Russian Empire on April 19, 1783, by the decree of Catherine II to the Senate on February 19, 1784, the Taurida Oblast was formed on the territory of the former Crimean Khanate, and the village was assigned to the Levkopol county, and after the dissolution of the Levkopol county in 1787, it was assigned to the Feodosia county of the Taurida Oblast. After the Pauline reforms from 1796 to 1802, it was included in the Akmechet county of the Novorossiya Governorate. Under the new administrative division, following the creation of the Taurida Governorate on October 8 (20), 1802, İslâm Terek was included in the Parpach volost of the Feodosiysky Uyezd.

İslâm Terek was renamed Kirovske in 1944 by the Soviet government. On 23 August 2023 the Ukrainian parliament symbolically restored the former name.

== Notable people ==
- Roman Avramenko (born 1988), Ukrainian javelin thrower
