= Kirov (surname) =

Kirov (Bulgarian: Киров, Russian: Киров) is a Slavic male surname, its feminine counterpart is Kirova. It may refer to

- Aleksandar Kirov (born 1990), Bulgarian association football player
- Aleksandr Kirov (born 1984), Kazakhstani association football player
- Anton Kirov (born 1990), Bulgarian association football player
- Atanas Kirov (born 1946), Bulgarian Olympic weightlifter
- Ivaylo Kirov (1947–2010), Bulgarian Olympic basketball player
- Lyudmil Kirov (born 1976), Bulgarian association football player
- Nikolay Kirov (athlete) (born 1957), Russian Olympic runner
- Nino Kirov (1945–2008), Bulgarian chess grandmaster
- Panayot Kirov (born 1958), Bulgarian Olympic wrestler
- Petar Kirov (born 1942), Bulgarian Olympic wrestler
- Sergey Kirov (1886–1934), Russian revolutionary
- Vasil Kirov (born 1975), Bulgarian association football player

== See also ==
- Kurov (surname)
