= Imeni Kirova, Russia =

Imeni Kirova (Russian: и́мени Ки́рова) is the name of several rural localities in Russia:

- Imeni Kirova, Republic of Dagestan, a selo in Yuzhny Selsoviet of Kizlyarsky District of the Republic of Dagestan
- Imeni Kirova, Georgiyevsky District, Stavropol Krai, a khutor in Alexandriysky Selsoviet of Georgiyevsky District of Stavropol Krai
- Imeni Kirova, Trunovsky District, Stavropol Krai, a settlement in Kirovsky Selsoviet of Trunovsky District of Stavropol Krai
- Imeni Kirova, Republic of Tatarstan, a settlement in Verkhneuslonsky District of the Republic of Tatarstan
- Imeni Kirova, Vladimir Oblast, a settlement in Kameshkovsky District of Vladimir Oblast

== See also ==
- pri 8-y GES imeni Kirova, later Imeni Kirova, names of the town of Kirovsk, Leningrad Oblast, before 1953 (then a work settlement)
- Kirov, Russia
