= Kirova, Republic of Bashkortostan =

Kirova Кирова
- Khutor
- Location within Bashkortostan Location within Russia
- Coordinates: 52°48′N 56°02′E
- Country: Russia
- Region: Bashkortostan
- District: Kugarchinsky District
- Time zone: UTC+5:00

Kirova (Russian: Кирова) is a rural locality (a khutor) in Yalchinsky Selsoviet, Kugarchinsky District, Bashkortostan, Russia. The population was 11 as of 2010. There is 1 street.

== Geography ==
Kirova is located 45 km northwest of Mrakovo (the district's administrative centre) by road. Khudayberdino is the nearest rural locality.
