= Kirova, Volgograd Oblast =

Kirova Кирова
- Settlement
- Location within Volgograd Oblast Location within Russia
- Coordinates: 48°28′N 44°31′E
- Country: Russia
- Region: Volgograd Oblast
- District: Svetloyarsky District
- Time zone: UTC+4:00

Kirova (Russian: Кирова) is a rural locality (a settlement) in Svetloyarsky District, Volgograd Oblast, Russia. The population was 2,616 as of 2010. There are 45 streets.

== Geography ==
Kirova is located 28 km west of Svetly Yar (the district's administrative centre) by road. Chapurniki is the nearest rural locality.
