= Kirovsk, Russia =

Kirovsk (Russian: Кировск) is the name of several inhabited localities in Russia.

Urban localities

- Kirovsk, Leningrad Oblast, a town in Kirovsky District of Leningrad Oblast
- Kirovsk, Murmansk Oblast, a town in Murmansk Oblast

Rural localities

- Kirovsk, Orenburg Oblast, a settlement in Kirovsky Selsoviet of Kvarkensky District in Orenburg Oblast
