= Kirov Bridge =

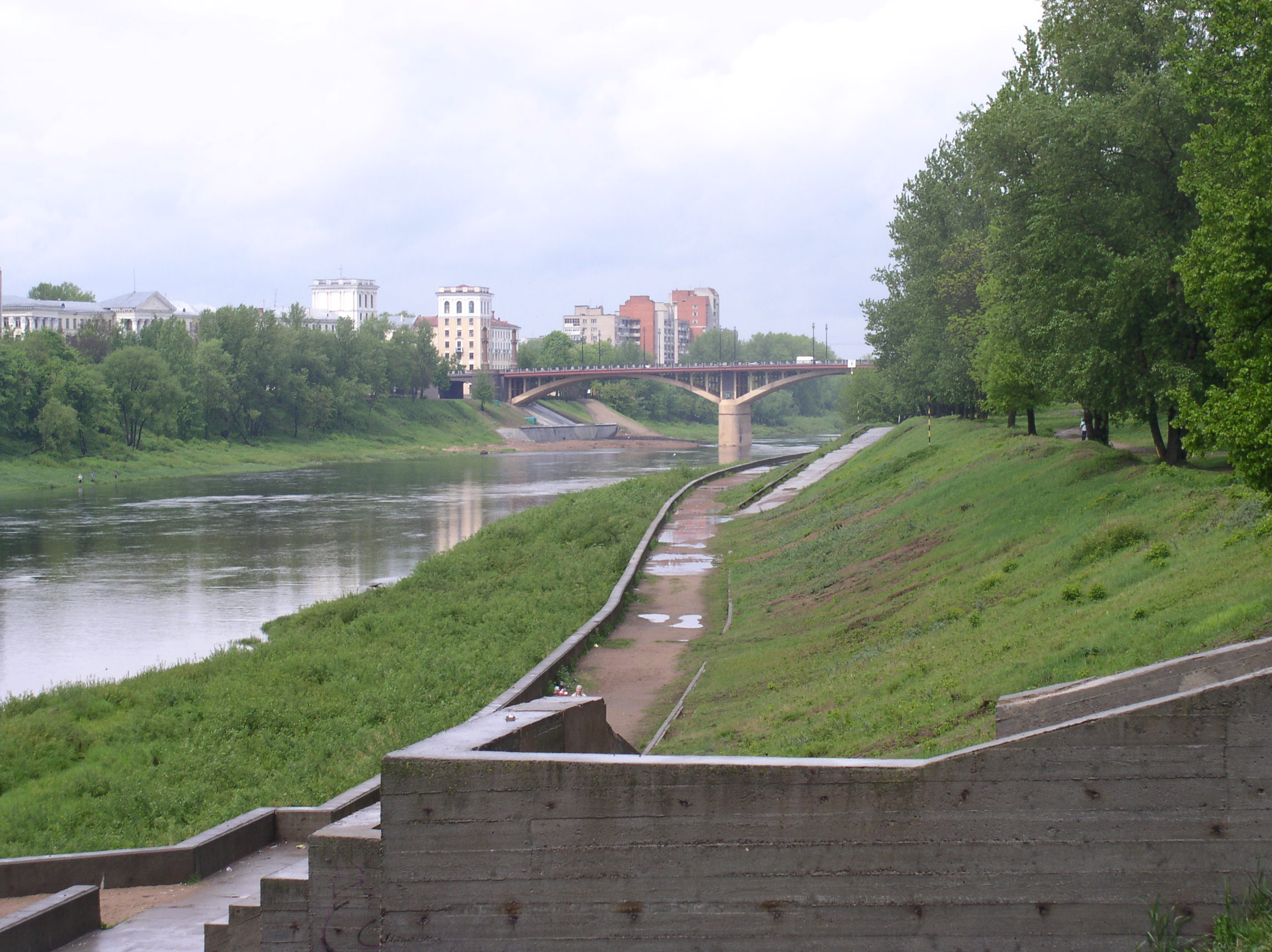
- Coordinates: 55°11′36″N 30°11′56″E
- Crosses: Dzvina river
- Locale: Vitsebsk, Belarus

Kirov Bridge (Belarusian: Кіраўскі мост, Kiraŭski most) is a bridge, on the Dzvina river, in the city of Vitsebsk in northern Belarus.
