= Kirov, Samukh =

Kirov
- Village
- Location within Azerbaijan
- Coordinates: 40°54′10″N 46°27′15″E
- Country: Azerbaijan
- Rayon: Samukh
- Time zone: UTC+4 (AZT)
  - Summer (DST): UTC+5 (AZT)

Kirov is a village in the Samukh Rayon of Azerbaijan.
