= Kirovsky, Belgorod Oblast =

Kirovsky Кировский
- Settlement
- Location within Belgorod Oblast Location within Russia
- Coordinates: 51°01′N 36°07′E
- Country: Russia
- Region: Belgorod Oblast
- District: Ivnyansky District
- Time zone: UTC+3:00

Kirovsky (Russian: Кировский) is a rural locality (a settlement) in Ivnyansky District, Belgorod Oblast, Russia. The population was 130 as of 2010.

== Geography ==
Kirovsky is located 8 km north of Ivnya (the district's administrative centre) by road. Fedchevka is the nearest rural locality.
