= Imeni Kirova, Armenia =

Imeni Kirova
- Location within Armenia Location within Ararat
- Coordinates: 39°54′57″N 44°36′01″E
- Country: Armenia
- Marz (Province): Ararat
- Time zone: UTC+4 ( )
  - Summer (DST): UTC+5 ( )

Imeni Kirova is a town in the Ararat Province of Armenia. The town is named after Sergey Kirov.

== See also ==
- Ararat Province
