= Kirovsky, Loktevsky District, Altai Krai =

Kirovsky Кировский
- Settlement
- Location within Altai Krai Location within Russia
- Coordinates: 51°00′N 81°30′E
- Country: Russia
- Region: Altai Krai
- District: Loktevsky District
- Time zone: UTC+7:00

Kirovsky (Russian: Кировский) is a rural locality (a settlement) and the administrative center of Kirovsky Selsoviet, Loktevsky District, Altai Krai, Russia. The population was 1,062 as of 2013. There are 15 streets.

== Geography ==
Kirovsky is located on the Zolotukha River, 4 km northeast of Gornyak (the district's administrative centre) by road. Izvestkovy is the nearest rural locality.
