= Kirovskoye, Republic of Bashkortostan =

Kirovskoye Кировское
- Village
- Location within Bashkortostan Location within Russia
- Coordinates: 54°42′N 56°27′E
- Country: Russia
- Region: Bashkortostan
- District: Iglinsky District
- Time zone: UTC+5:00

Kirovskoye (Russian: Кировское) is a rural locality (a village) in Kaltymanovsky Selsoviet, Iglinsky District, Bashkortostan, Russia. The population was 62 as of 2010. There are 2 streets.

== Geography ==
Kirovskoye is located 20 km south of Iglino (the district's administrative centre) by road. Kaltymanovo is the nearest rural locality.
