= Kirovsky, Amur Oblast =

Kirovsky Кировский
- Settlement
- Location within Amur Oblast Location within Russia
- Coordinates: 54°25′N 126°58′E
- Country: Russia
- Region: Amur Oblast
- District: Zeysky District
- Time zone: UTC+9:00

Kirovsky (Russian: Кировский) is a rural locality (a settlement) in Beregovoy Selsoviet of Zeysky District, Amur Oblast, Russia. The population was 23 as of 2018. There are 3 streets.

== Geography ==
Kirovsky is located in the valley of the Dzhelta River, 126 km north of Zeya (the district's administrative centre) by road. Zolotaya Gora is the nearest rural locality.
