= Kirovskaya metro station =

Kirovskaya metro station may refer to:

- Kirovskaya, name of the Chistye Prudy station of the Moscow Metro in 1935–1990
- Kirovskaya (Nizhny Novgorod Metro), a station of the Nizhny Novgorod Metro, Nizhny Novgorod, Russia
- Kirovskaya metro station (Samara), a station of the Samara Metro, Samara, Russia
