= Kirovske Raion =

Coordinates: 45°13′25″N 35°12′19″E

Kirovske Raion İslâm Terek rayonı
- Raion
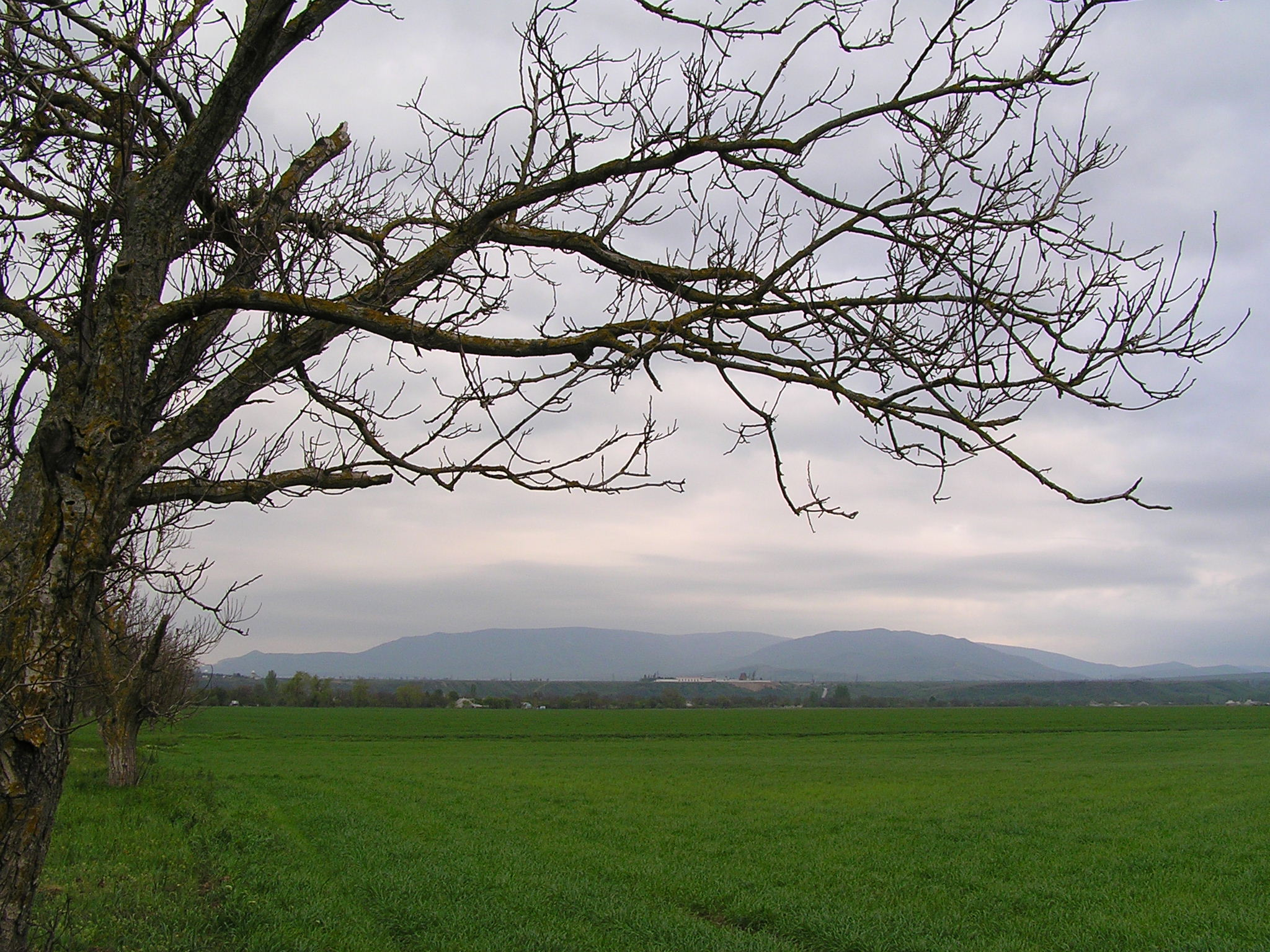
- Agarmysh, Kirovske Raion

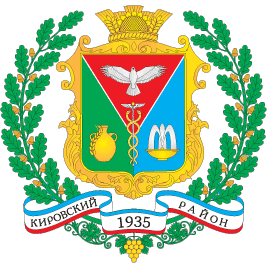
- Flag Seal
- Raion location within Crimea
- Country: Ukraine
- Republic: Crimea
- Abolished: 7 September 2023
- Capital: Kirovske
- Subdivisions: List: 1 cities; 1 towns; 39 villages

Area
  - Total: 1,208 km^{2} (466 sq mi)

Population (2014)
  - Total: 50,834
  - Density: 42.08/km^{2} (109.0/sq mi)
- Time zone: UTC+3 (MSK)
- Dialing code: +380-6555
- Website: kirovskiy.rk.gov.ru

Kirovske Raion (Russian: Кировский район; Ukrainian: Кіровський район or Іслямтерецький район; Crimean Tatar: İslâm Terek rayonı) was one of the 25 regions of the Autonomous Republic of Crimea until 2020. The raion's administrative centre is the urban-type settlement of Kirovske (also known as Isliam-Terek). Its population is 50,834 (2014 Census).

The area of the raion has been occupied by Russia since 2014, who continue using it as an administrative unit of their Republic of Crimea.

== Geography ==
The raion is located in eastern Crimea. The geography of the raion is divided between the foothills in the south, while the north forms part of the Crimean steppe. The main waterway of the northern peninsula, the North Crimean Canal supplying water from the Dnieper river, passes through the raion.

The raion is famous for the historical town of Stary Krym.

== History ==
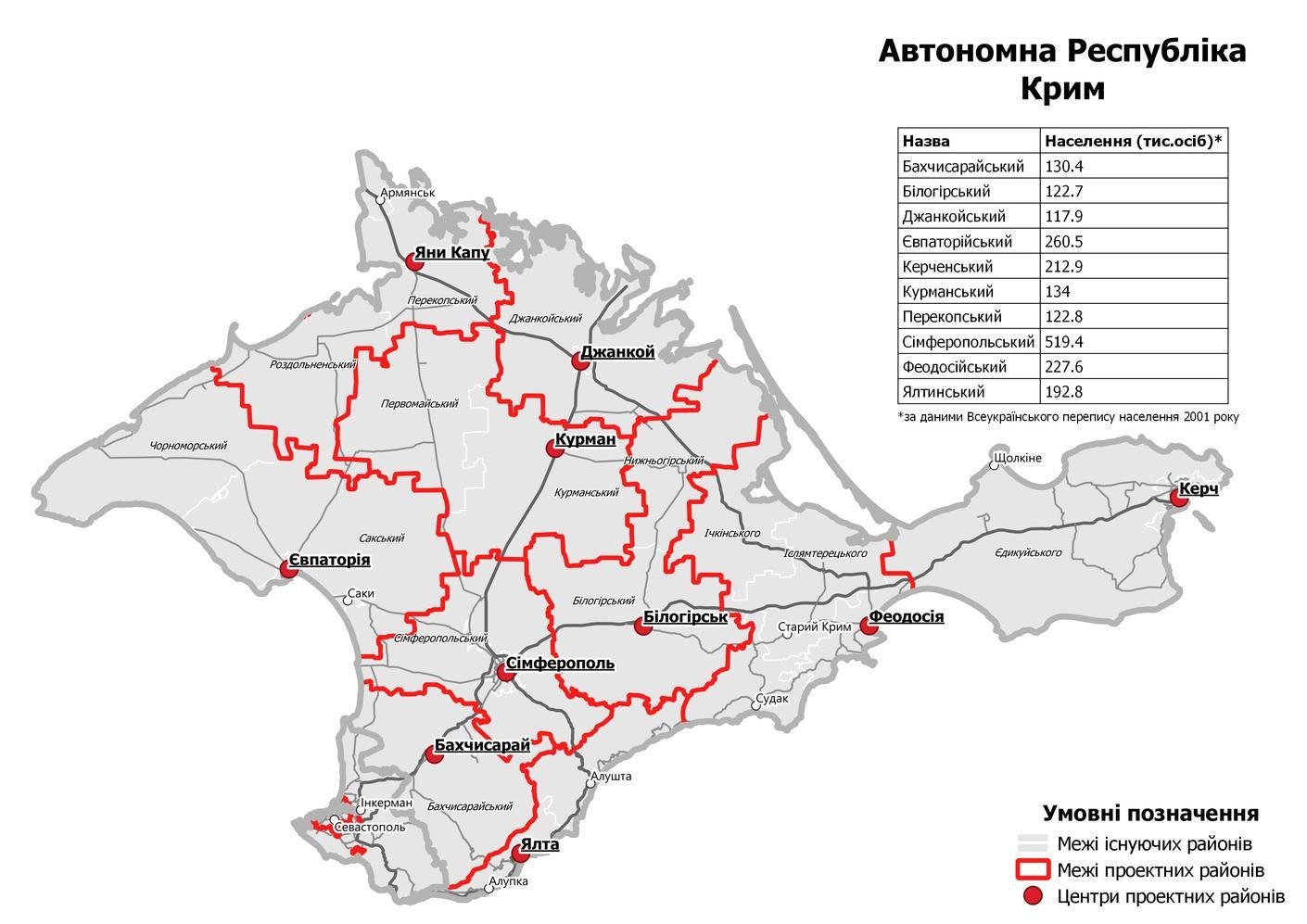
In July 2020, the Verkhovna Rada approved an administrative reform in Crimea abolishing Kirovske Raion

In 2014, Russia unilaterally and illegally annexed the Crimean peninsula from Ukraine. it has occupied it continuously since then, and since then has also used Kirovske Raion as an administrative unit of their Republic of Crimea.

In 2016, the Verkhovna Rada of Ukraine passed a law that would rename Kirovske Raion to Isliam-Terek Raion (Ukrainian: Іслямтерецький район, Crimean Tatar: İslâm Terek rayonı); however, the law had a clause that it would only come into effect when Ukraine re-established control over Crimea, which has not occurred since.

In July 2020, Ukraine conducted an administrative reform throughout its de jure territory. This included the Administrative divisions of Crimea, which were reorganized from 14 raions and 11 municipalities into 10 raions, with municipalities abolished altogether. In this re-organization, Kirovske Raion was set to be officially abolished, with its territories merged into Feodosia Raion. This law, too, was scheduled to come into effect when Crimea was back under Ukrainian control.

In September 2023, the Verkhovna Rada enacted a law amending the previous laws to remove the clause about them coming into effect upon recapture, instead changing it so that they came into effect immediately upon the amendment. Thus, the Kirovske Raion of the Autonomous Republic of Crimea was simultaneously renamed and abolished on 7 September 2023.
