= Kirovsky, Primorsky Krai =

Urban locality in Kirovsky District, Primorsky Krai, Primorsky Krai, Russia

Coordinates: 45°05′N 133°30′E

Kirovsky (Russian: Ки́ровский) is an urban locality (an urban-type settlement) and the administrative center of Kirovsky District of Primorsky Krai, Russia, located 27 kilometers (17 mi) east of the China–Russia border. Population: 9,057 (2010 census); 9,698 (2002 census); 10,662 (1989 Soviet census).

== History ==
It was established in 1891 as Uspenka (Успенка) and was granted urban-type settlement status in 1939.
