= Kirovsky District, Primorsky Krai =

Kirovsky District Кировский район (Russian)
- District
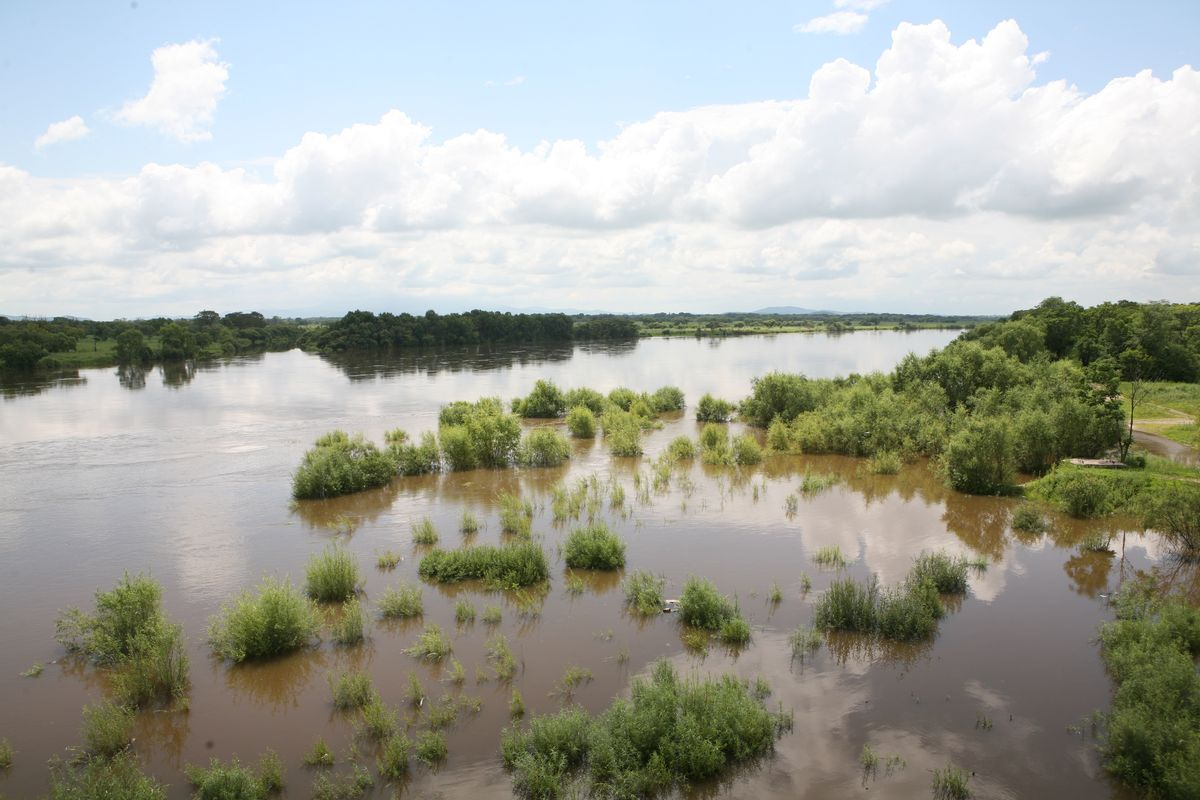
- Ussuri River, Kirovsky District

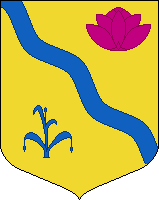
- Coat of arms
- Location of Kirovsky District in Primorsky Krai
- Coordinates: 45°06′N 133°30′E
- Country: Russia
- Federal subject: Primorsky Krai
- Established: 1935
- Administrative center: Kirovsky

Area
  - Total: 3,483.9 km^{2} (1,345.1 sq mi)

Population (2010 Census)
  - Total: 21,249
  - Density: 6.0992/km^{2} (15.797/sq mi)
  - Urban: 64.7%
  - Rural: 35.3%

Administrative structure
  - Inhabited localities: 2 urban-type settlements, 25 rural localities

Municipal structure
  - Municipally incorporated as: Kirovsky Municipal District
  - Municipal divisions: 2 urban settlements, 4 rural settlements
- Time zone: UTC+10 (MSK+7)
- OKTMO ID: 05612000
- Website: http://mo.primorsky.ru/kirovsky/

Kirovsky District (Russian: Ки́ровский райо́н) is one of the twenty-two administrative and municipal districts (raion) in Primorsky Krai, Russia. It is located in the west of the krai. The area of the district is 3,483.9 square kilometers (1,345.1 sq mi). Its administrative center is the urban locality (an urban-type settlement) of Kirovsky. Population: 21,249 (2010 census); 24,618 (2002 census); 29,516 (1989 Soviet census). The population of the administrative center accounts for 42.6% of the district's total population.

== Geography ==
Forests occupy half of the district's territory. The highest temperature ever registered in Kirovsky District was 36.7 °C (98.1 °F), on July 23, 2021.

== Economy and tourism ==
Agriculture, beekeeping, and timber-cutting are considered to have potential.

Health resorts development dominates the economy of the district. Narzan-type Shmakovskiye mineral springs (hydrocarbonated and calcium-magnesium), with limpid water rich in carbonic acid, are well-known. Shmakovka is a unique health-center complex where is situated Imeni Pyatidesyatiletiya Oktyabrya Health Resort for three hundred people.

The district's landmarks include a tower-chapel located on one of the highest viewpoints of the Shmakovka Resort.
