= Topchikhinsky District =

Topchikhinsky District Топчихинский район (Russian)
- District
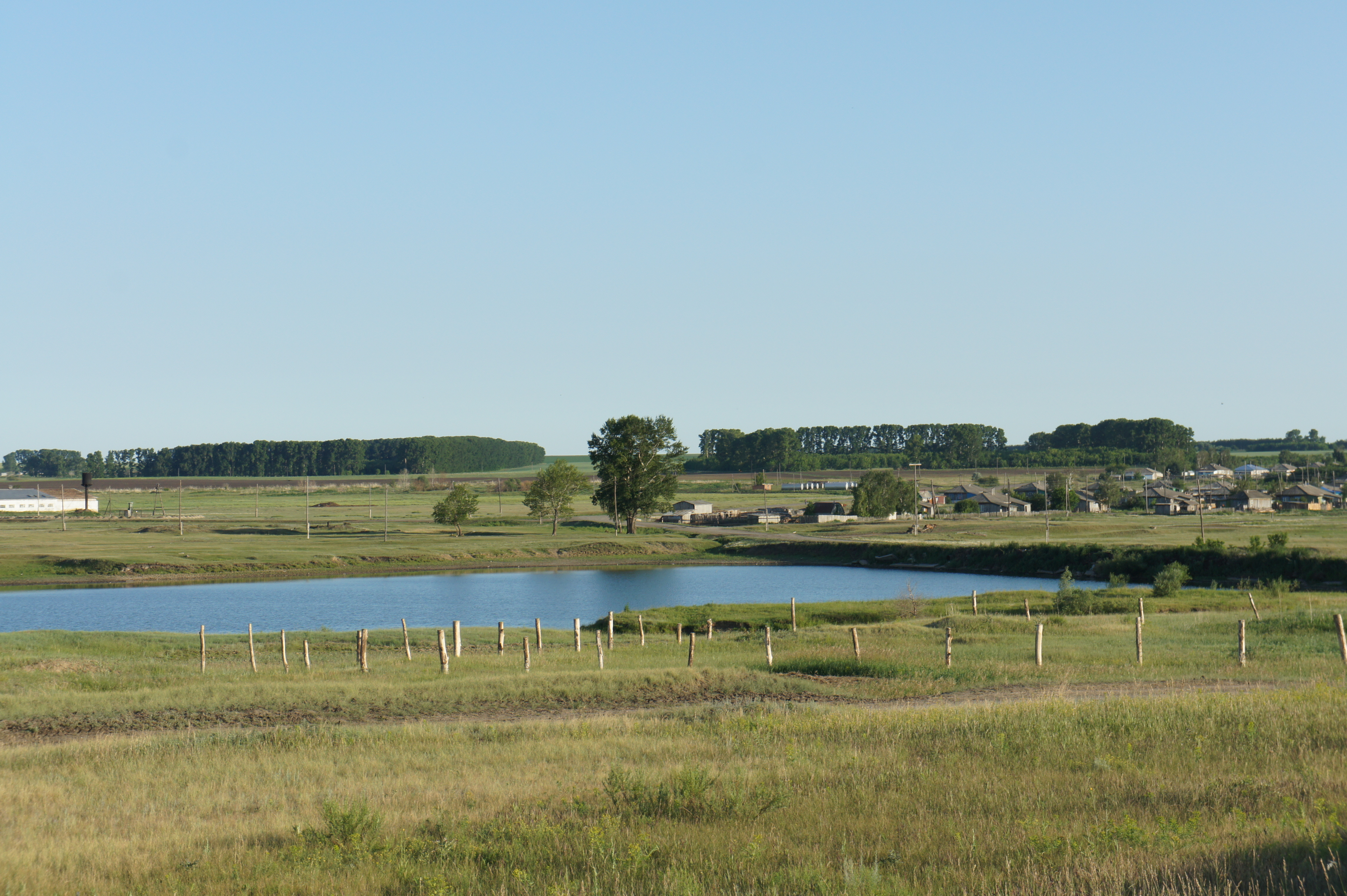
- The settlement of Kirovsky in Topchikhinsky District

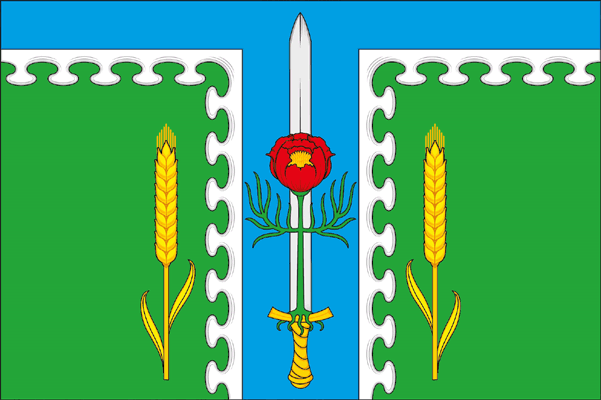
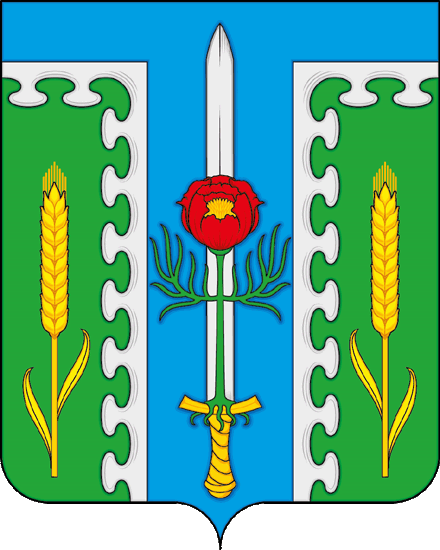
- Flag Coat of arms
- Location of Topchikhinsky District in Altai Krai
- Coordinates: 52°48′N 83°06′E
- Country: Russia
- Federal subject: Altai Krai
- Established: 1924
- Administrative center: Topchikha

Area
  - Total: 3,300 km^{2} (1,300 sq mi)

Population (2010 Census)
  - Total: 23,350
  - Density: 7.1/km^{2} (18/sq mi)
  - Urban: 0%
  - Rural: 100%

Administrative structure
  - Administrative divisions: 17 selsoviet
  - Inhabited localities: 38 rural localities

Municipal structure
  - Municipally incorporated as: Topchikhinsky Municipal District
  - Municipal divisions: 0 urban settlements, 17 rural settlements
- Time zone: UTC+7 (MSK+4)
- OKTMO ID: 01649000
- Website: http://www.top-rayon.ru/

Topchikhinsky District (Russian: Топчи́хинский райо́н) is an administrative and municipal district (raion), one of the fifty-nine in Altai Krai, Russia. It is located in the center of the krai. The area of the district is 3,300 square kilometers (1,300 sq mi). Its administrative center is the rural locality (a selo) of Topchikha. Population: 23,350 (2010 census); 27,305 (2002 census); 27,528 (1989 Soviet census). The population of Topchikha accounts for 37.8% of the district's total population.

== Geography ==
Lake Peschanoye is located in the district.
