= Topchikha =

Human settlement in Topchikhinsky District, Altai Krai, Russia

Topchikha Топчиха
- Village
- Location within Altai Krai Location within Russia
- Coordinates: 52°48′56″N 83°06′58″E
- Country: Russia
- Region: Altai Krai
- District: Topchikhinsky District
- Time zone: UTC+7:00

Topchikha (Russian: Топчиха) is a rural locality (a selo) and the administrative center of Topchikhinsky District of Altai Krai, Russia. Population: 8,815 (2010 census); 8,354 (2002 census); 9,069 (1989 Soviet census).
