= Yeni Suraxanı =

- Municipality
- Location within Azerbaijan
- Coordinates: 40°25′52″N 50°02′10″E
- Country: Azerbaijan
- City: Baku
- Raion: Suraxanı

Population (2008)
  - Total: 16,127
- Time zone: UTC+4 (AZT)
  - Summer (DST): UTC+5 (AZT)

Yeni Suraxanı (also, Imeni Kirova, Kirov Adına, Kirova, Posëlok Imeni Kirova, Rəsulzadə, and Yeni-Surakhany) is a municipality in Baku, Azerbaijan. It has a population of 16,127.

== Road ==
Baku Airport Highway

== Rail ==
Baku suburban railway station is planned here.
