= Rəsulzadə =

Rasulzade Azerbaijani: Rəsulzadə
- Municipality
- Location within Azerbaijan
- Coordinates: 40°26′04″N 49°50′01″E
- Country: Azerbaijan
- City: Baku
- District: Binəqədi

Population (2008)
  - Total: 47,921
- Time zone: UTC+4 (AZT)
  - Summer (DST): UTC+5 (AZT)

Rasulzade (Azerbaijani: Rəsulzadə) is a settlement and municipality in Baku, Azerbaijan. It has a population of 47,921. It is named after Mahammad Amin Rasulzade. Since the early 1990s, it is composed of two settlements, known originally as Poselok imeni Vorovskogo and Poselok imeni Kirova.

== Transport ==
=== Road ===
- Azadliq Avenue
- Ziya Bunyadov Avenue

=== Metro ===
S-2 Metro Station is planned in this area by Baku Metro.
