= Efim Minin =

Belarusian artist and graphic artist (1886–1937)

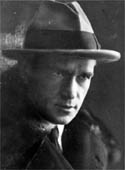
- Born: 8 October 1886; Surazh, Vitebsk province, Russian Empire
- Died: 29 December 1937 (aged 41); Vitebsk, Byelorussian Soviet Socialist Republic, Soviet Union
- Known for: artist, exlibrist
- Movement: Socialist realism
- Patrons: Yehuda (Yuri) Pen, Robert Falk, Solomon Judowin

Efim Semyonovich Minin (Belarusian: Яфім Сямёнавіч Мінін, Russian: Ефим Семёнович Минин); 20 October [O.S. 8 October] 1896 – 29 December 1937) was a Byelorussian artist and graphic artist of Jewish origin. He was executed in Vitebsk during the Stalinist repressions.

== Biography ==
Efim Minin was born on 20 October 1896, in Surazh, Vitebsk province, Russian Empire.

His grandfather, Timofei Ivanovich Minin, was the head of the Old Believers community, had 10 children and lived for 103 years. His father, Semyon Timofeyevich (1860-1940), was a Surazh burgher. His mother, Anna Mikhailovna Kazakova (1866-1909), was the daughter of a nachetnik (начётчики) of the Old Believer community.

In 1913-1915 he studied at the V. Grekov Commercial School in Vitebsk. He served in the army during the First World War. After demobilisation in 1918 he entered the Vitebsk Art studio of Yehuda (Yuri) Pen; he was also a pupil of Solomon Judowin.

In 1920-1921 he taught at the Vitebsk Art and Practice Institute. Due to disagreements with the actions of the new management of the institute, on 23 September 1923, together with Pen (vice-rector for academic work), Judowin and a group of students, he prepared a collective resignation letter and left the institute. Later, until the end of the 1920s, he taught at the Vitebsk Jewish Pedagogical Technical School.

During the period of mass repressions in January 1933, Vitaly Volsky, a member of the All-Union Cheka-GPU (he was briefly director of the Belarusian Art College when Minin returned to teach there), published an article in the national magazine Mastatsstva i revalutsiya entitled About the recurrence of national-democratism in the works of the artist Minin.

A quote about bookplates that Minin had created gives an idea of the style of the article's denunciation of his work:

The bookplate made for Shlyubsky is characterized by its bare ethnography. In its center is a mound. An old peasant is sitting on the left side of the mound playing the dulcimer. An old man also sits on the mound and plays the bagpipe. Next to him, another old man in a straw hat is standing and playing the trumpet. The National Assembly of Shlyubsky was pleased to find in these bookplates of Minin's works vivid impressions of the Belarusian national revival.

The article was reprinted immediately in other publications, including the newspaper Vitsiebskі Praletary.

Efim Minin was arrested in November 1937 in Vitebsk. By the decision of the Commission of the People's Commissariat of Internal Affairs (NKVD) and the USSR Prosecutor's Office of 19 November 1937 he was sentenced to execution as a member of the Polish Military Organisation (POW), although it existed only during the First World War. The sentence was executed on 29 December of the same year in the basement of the UNKVD building in Vitebsk.

Minin was rehabilitated posthumously in 1958.

== Selected paintings ==
Efim Minin was a graphic artist, portraitist, and exlibrist. From 1920 he worked mainly in woodcut technique. The leading theme of his work was urban landscapes of Vitebsk.

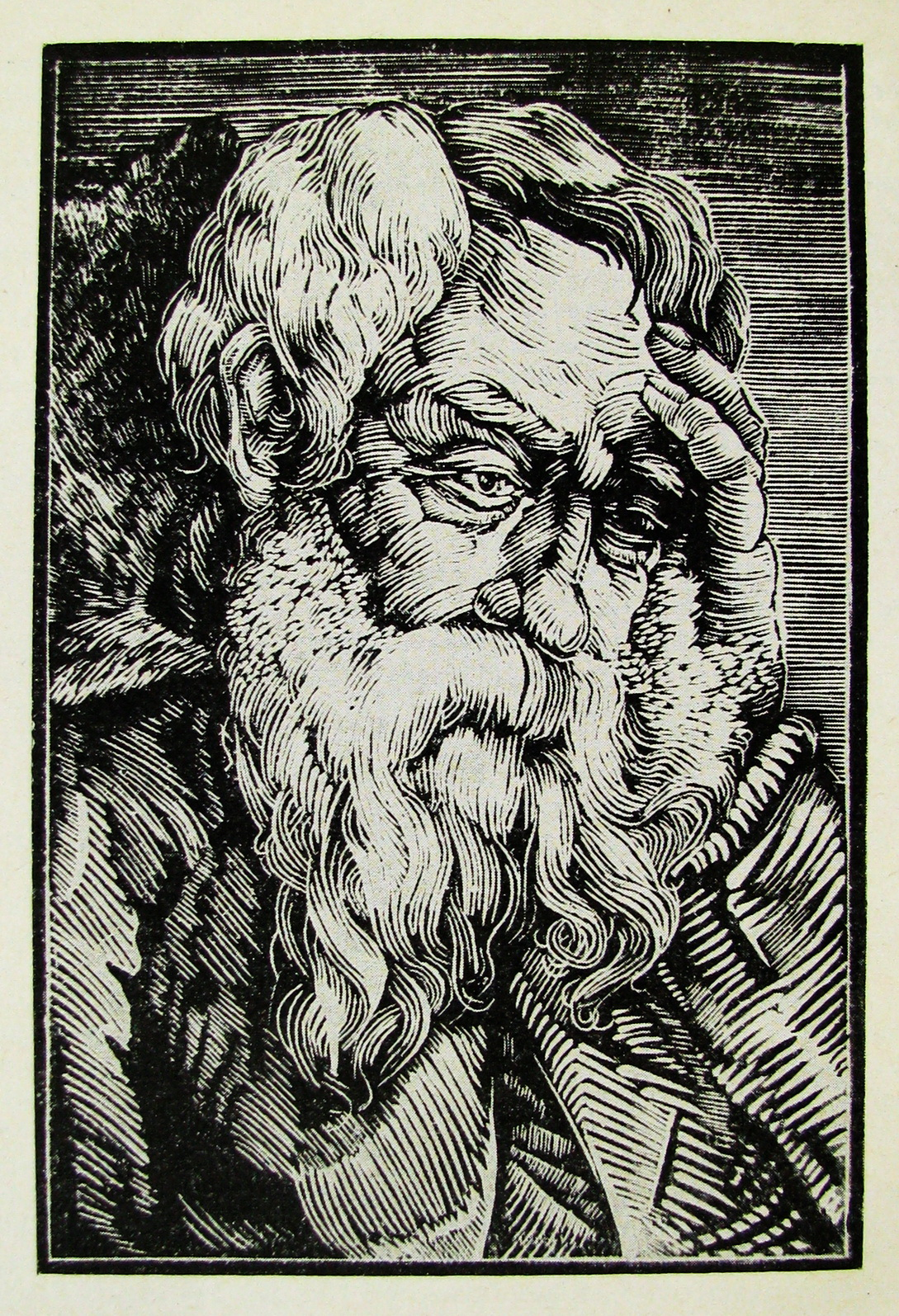

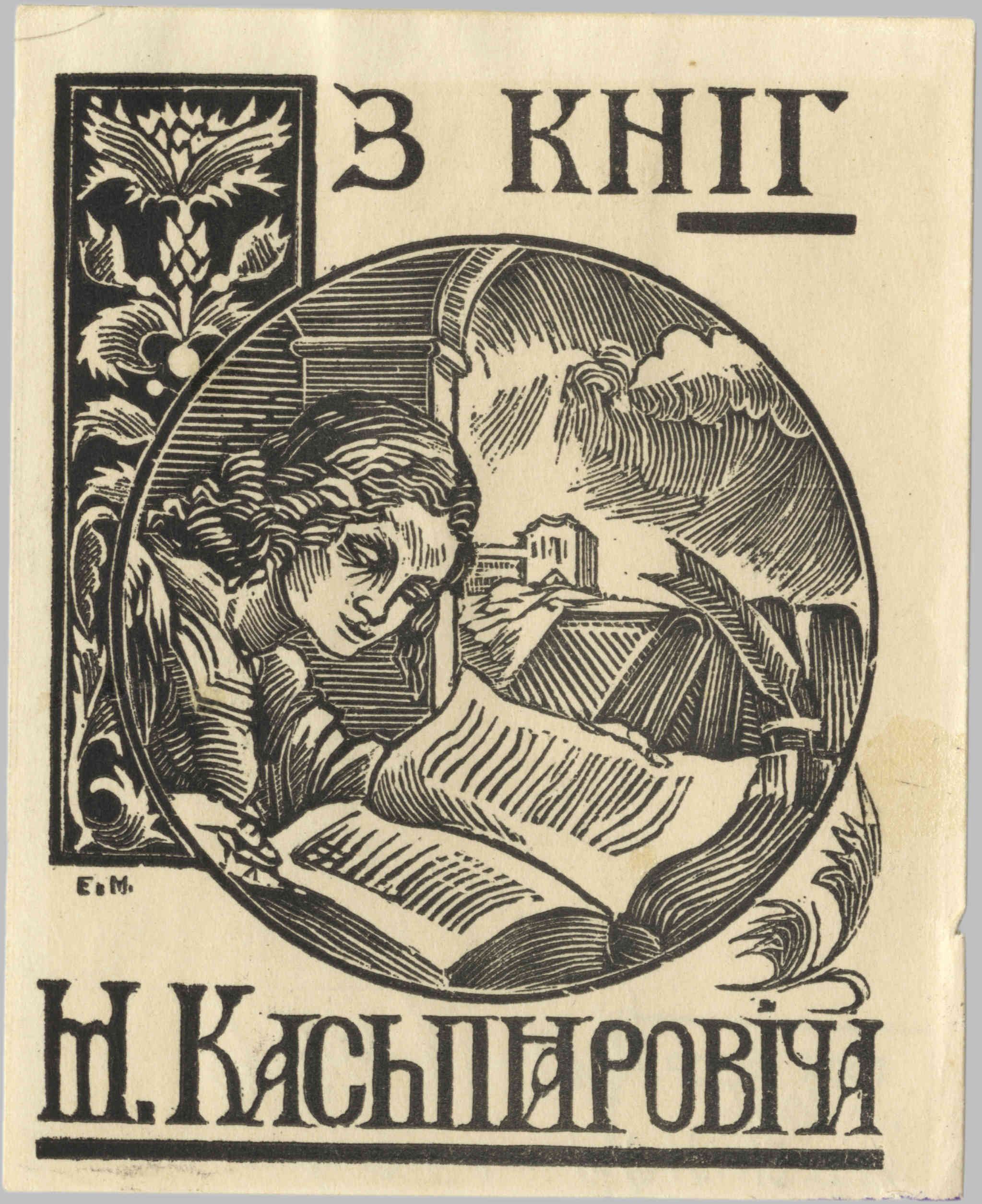

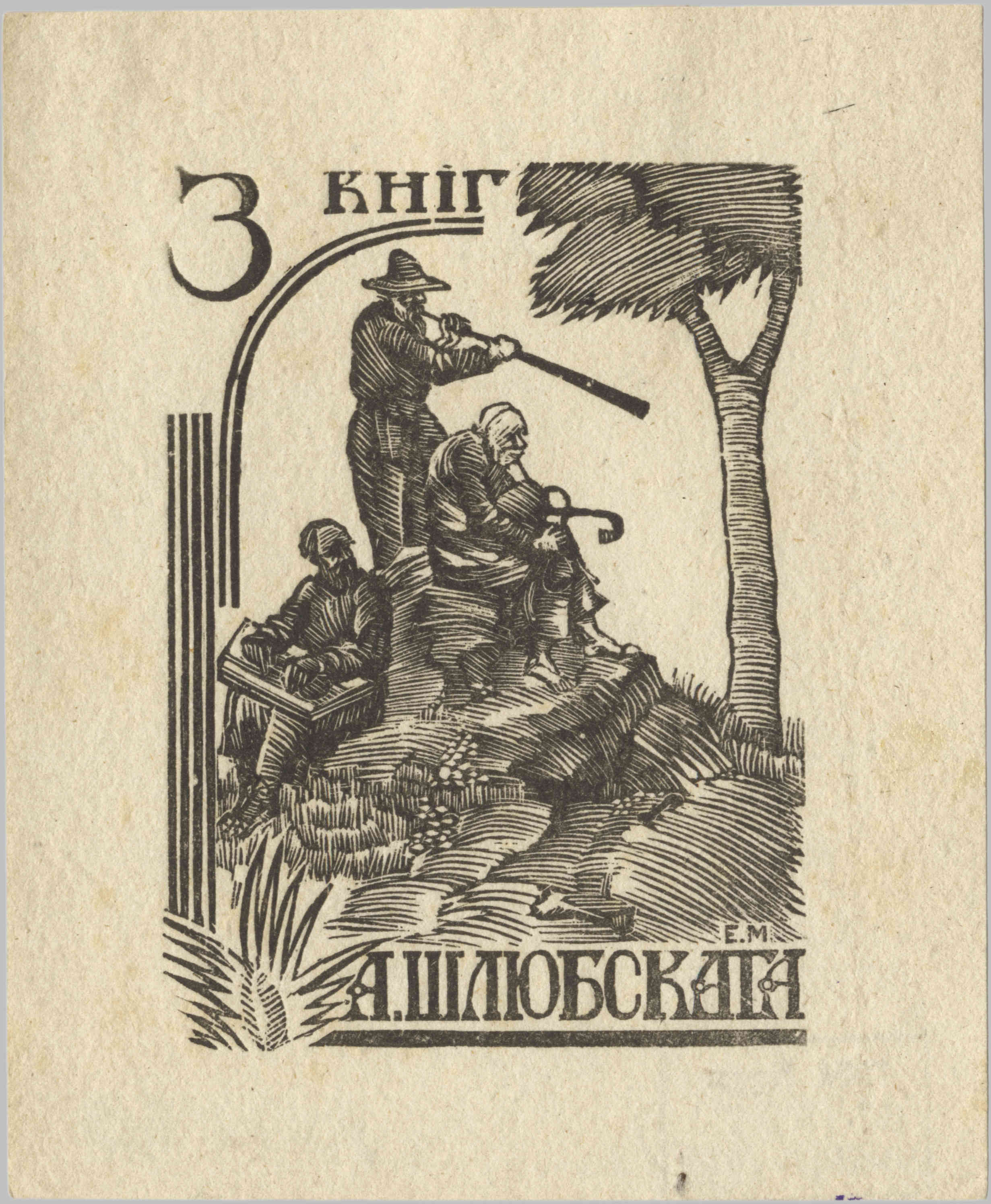

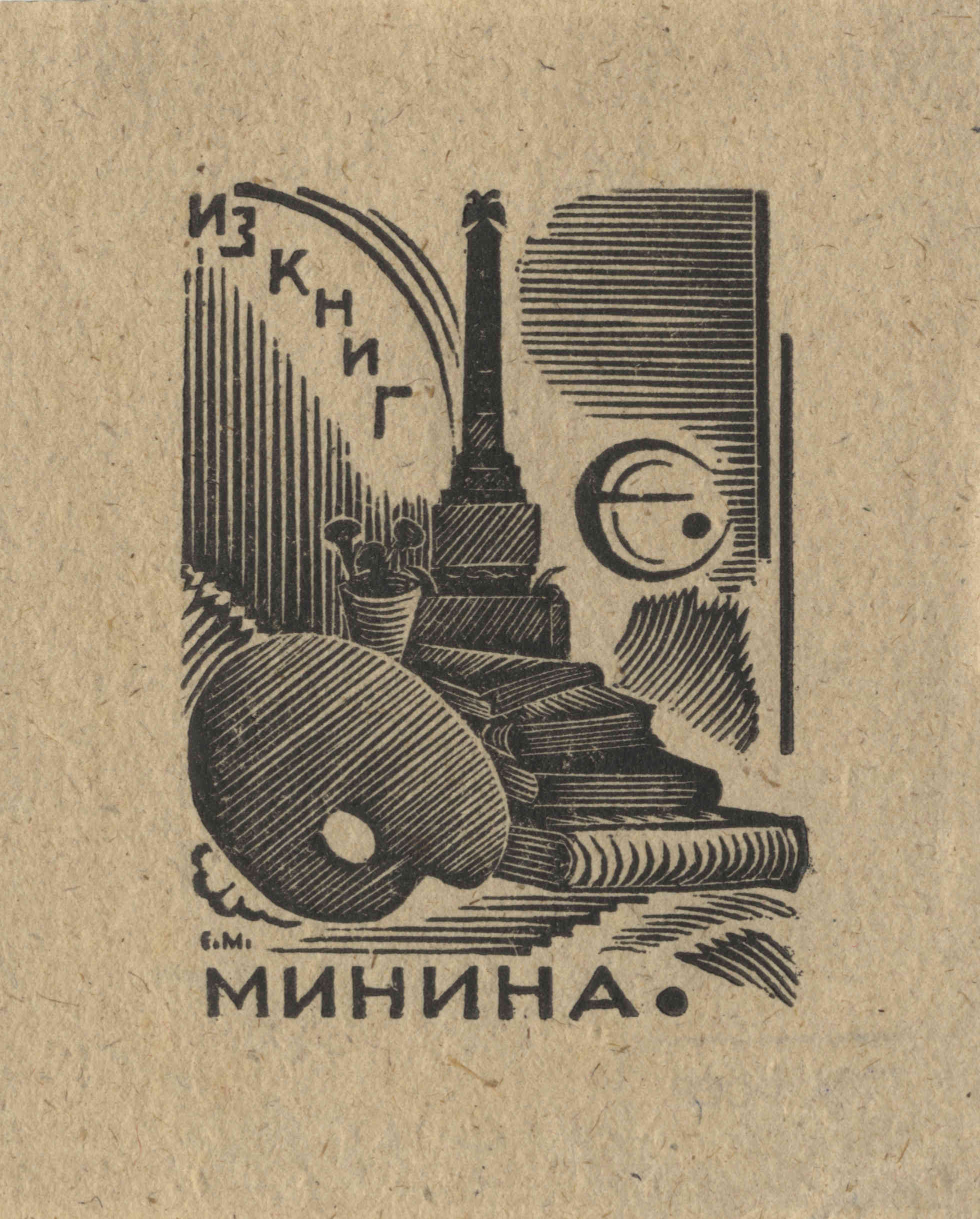

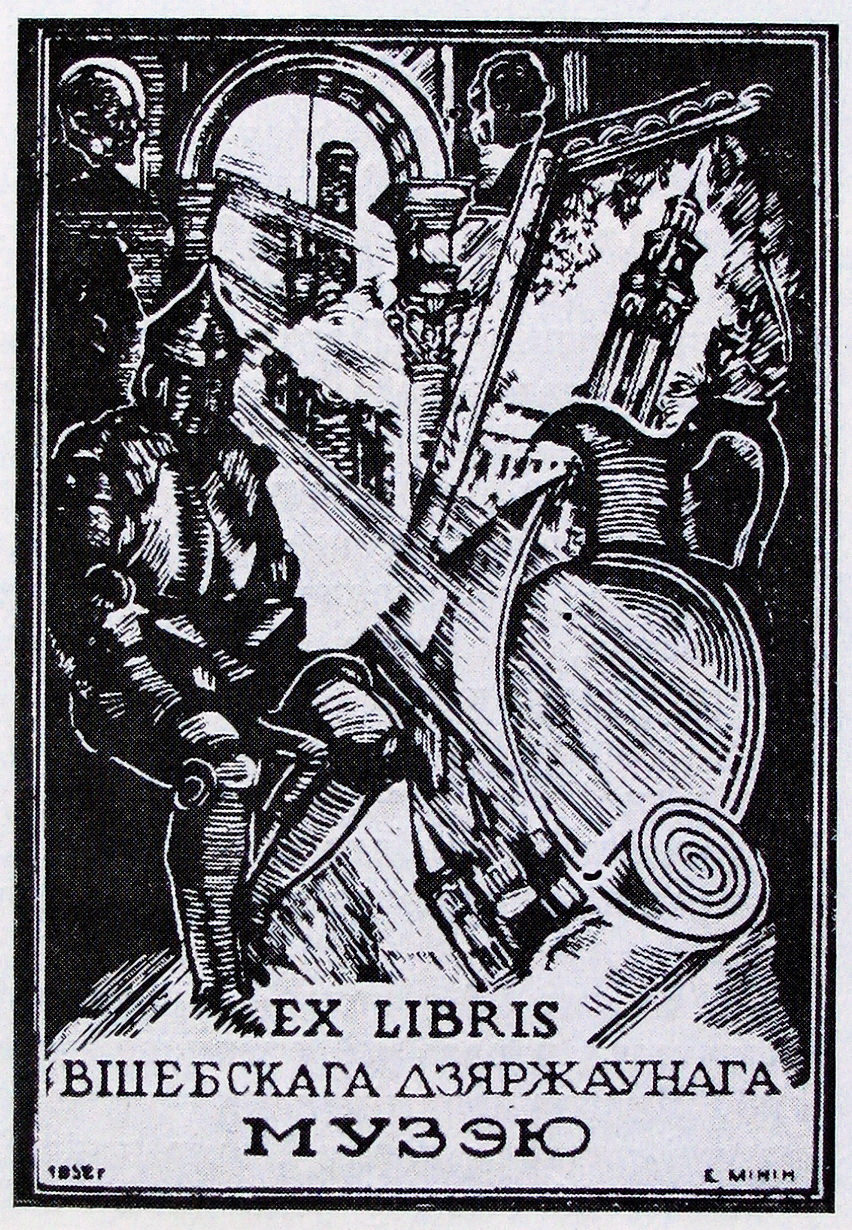

== Drawings of Vitebsk ==
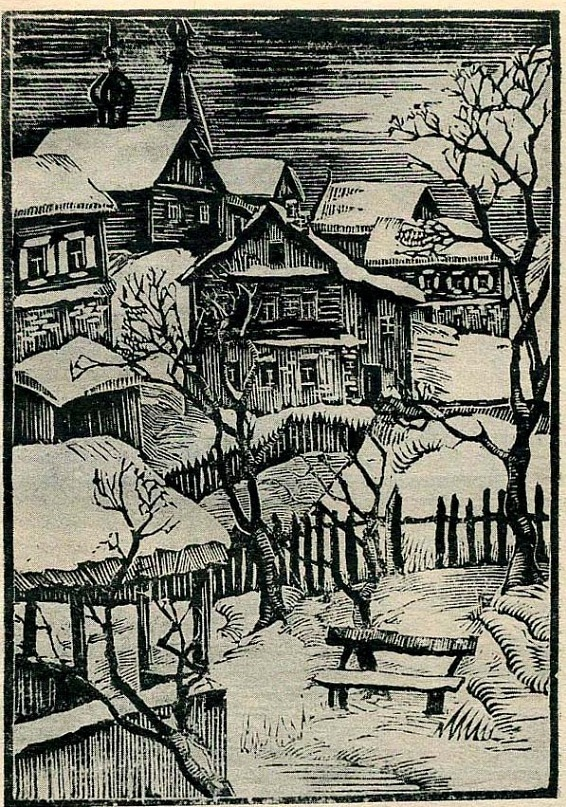
1926

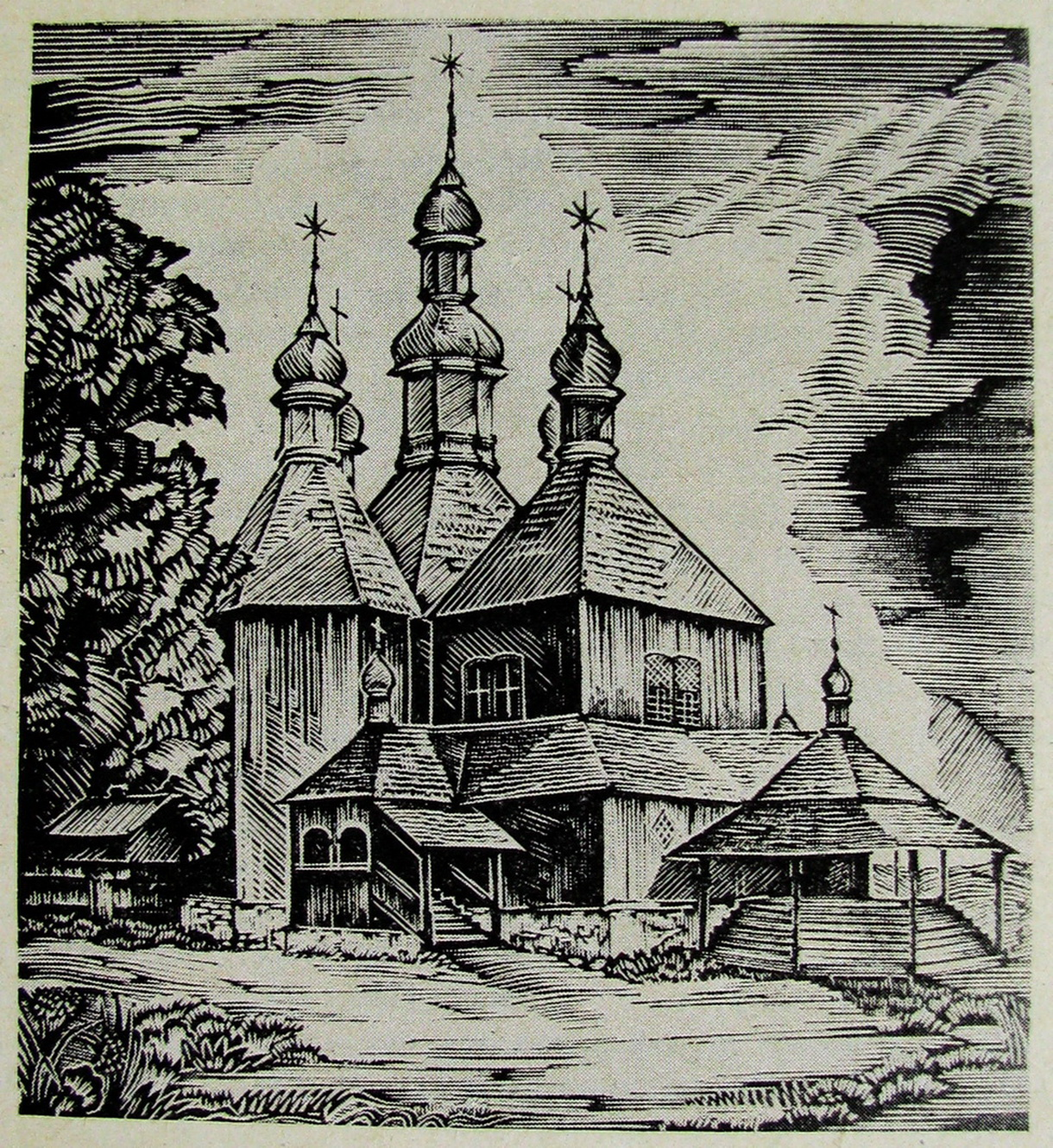
1927

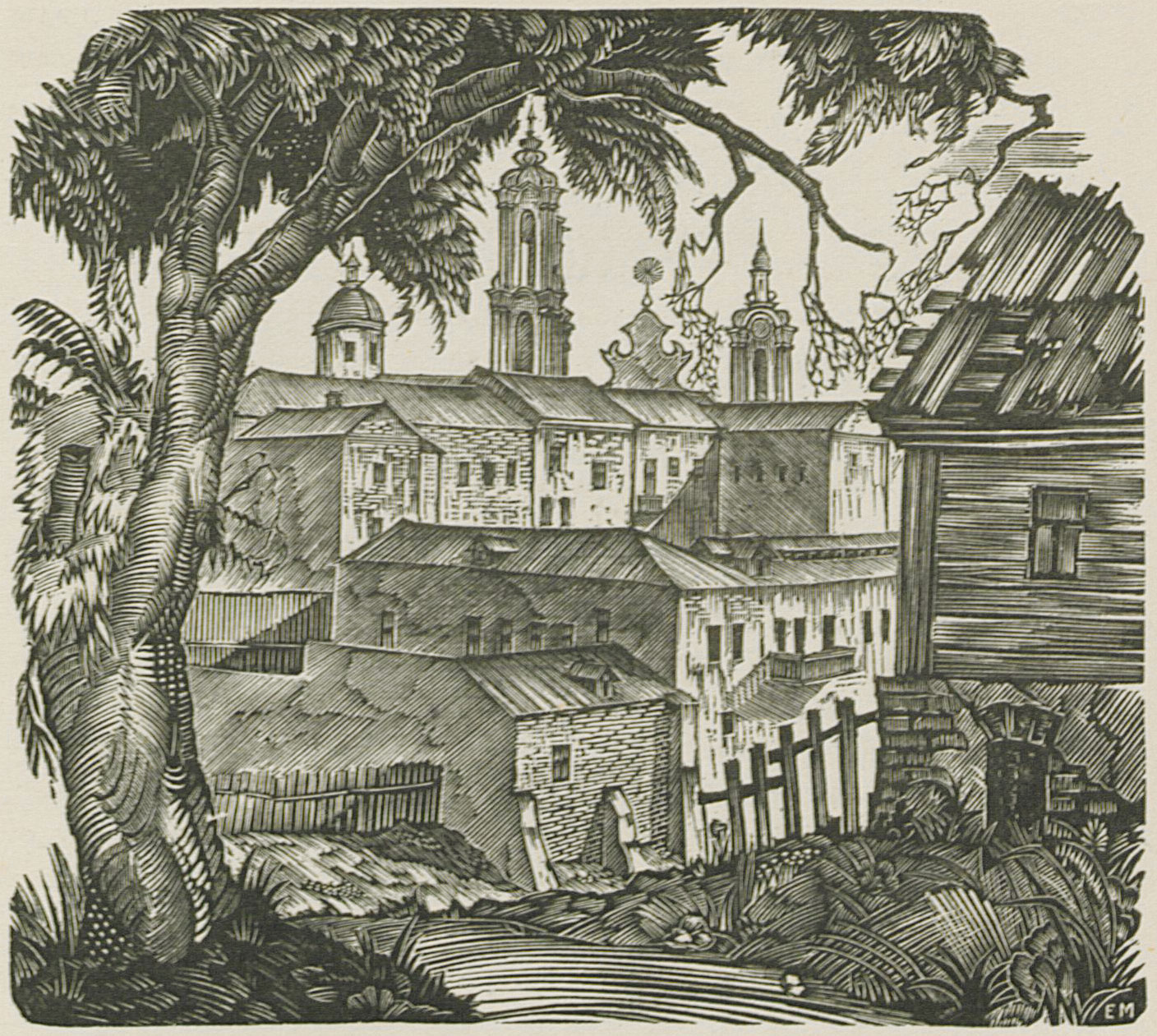
1927

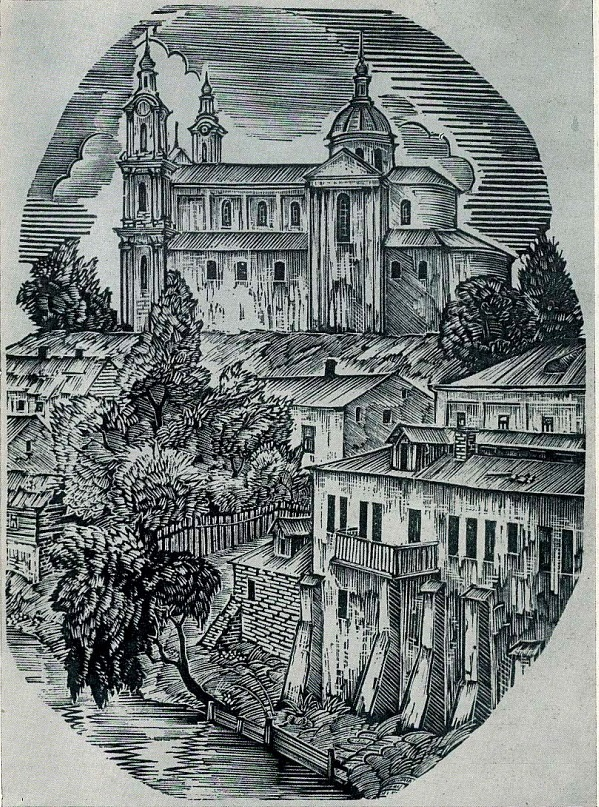
1927

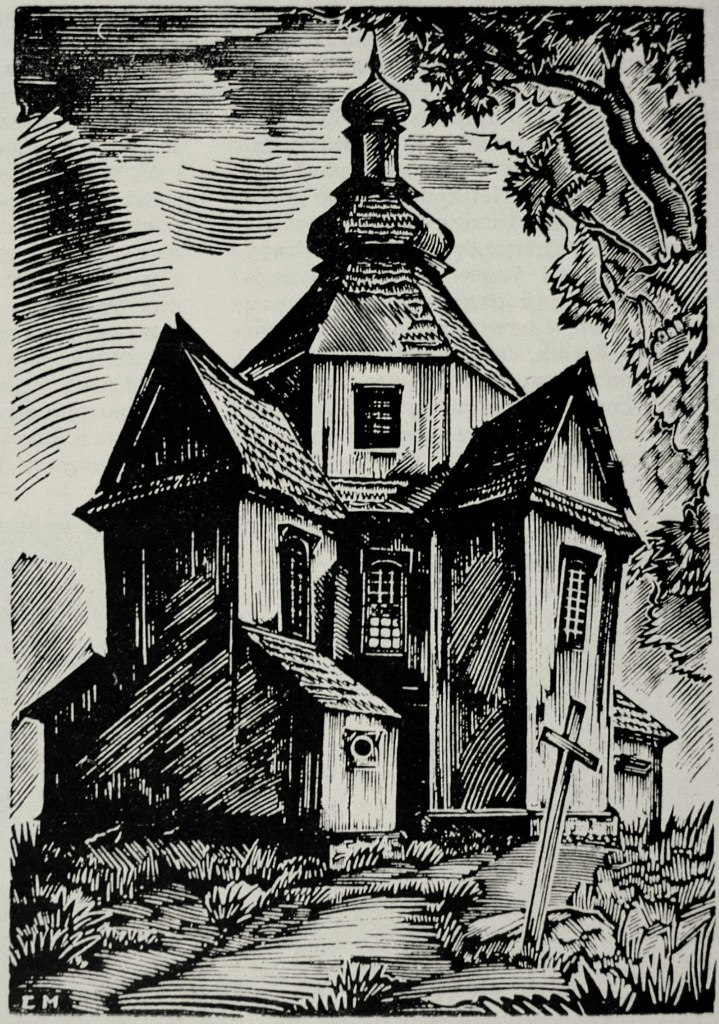
1928

== Museums ==
Minin's works can be found in museums

- Pushkin State Museum of Fine Arts, Moscow;
- Vitebsk regional museum;
- National Art Museum of the Republic of Belarus, Minsk.

== See also ==
List of Russian artists
