= Yudel Pen =

Belarusian artist (1854-1937)

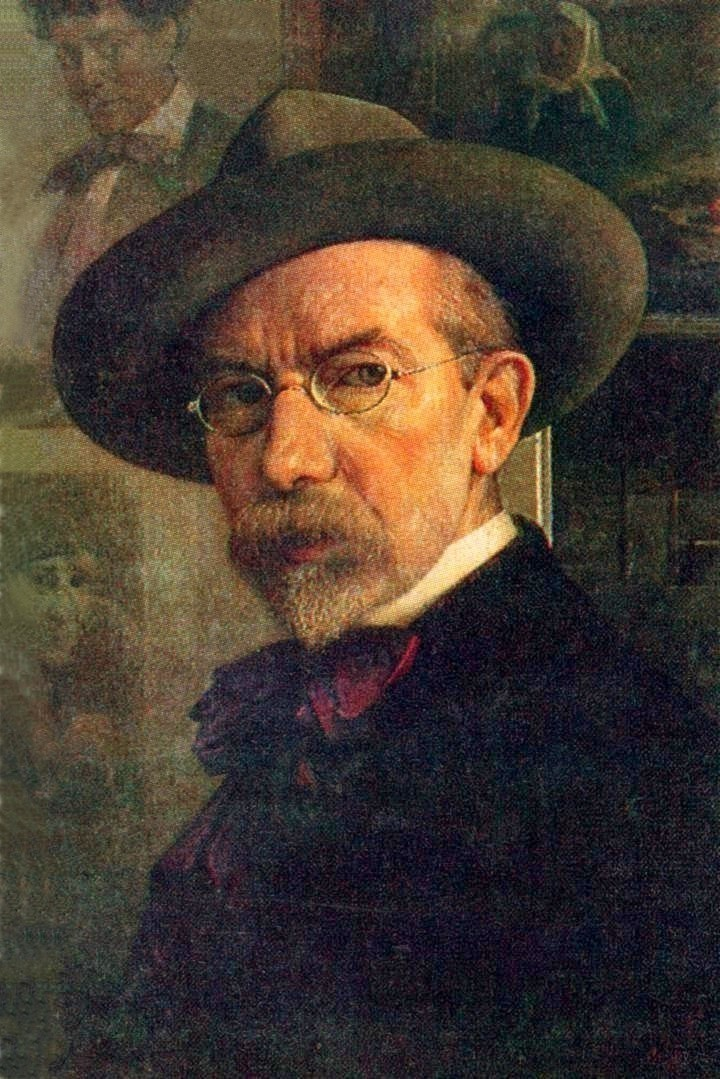
Yudel Pen, self-portrait, 1922

Yudel Pen, also known as Yehuda Pen or Yury Pen, (Note: Yudel is a Yiddish name, Yiddish: יודל פּען, Belarusian: Юдаль Моўшавіч Пэн. Yehuda is a Hebrew name, though it's very unlikely that Pen himself used it. Yury is a Russified name, Russian: Юрий Моисеевич, Belarusian: Юрый Майсеевіч.) (5 June [24 May Old Style] 1854 - 28 February 1937) was a Jewish artist and art teacher active in the Russian Empire and Soviet Union. He is best known for founding an influential art school in Vitebsk and teaching notable avant-garde artists like Marc Chagall, El Lissitzky, and Ossip Zadkine. Pen was one of the first painters to consistently depict Jewish life in the Pale of Settlement; he is sometimes called "the Sholem Aleichem of painting".

Born in a poor Jewish family in a shtetl, he showed an early talent for drawing and painting. He got an academic training in the St. Petersburg Academy of Arts, and several years after graduation he opened an art school in Vitebsk, where he taught many poor, mainly Jewish children, often for free. Pen was murdered in 1937; though officially called a robbery, his students believed that he was killed by NKVD during the Stalin's purges. A lot of his paintings were lost during the World War II. The surviving works are split between the National Art Museum in Minsk and the Vitebsk Regional Museum of Local History.

== Early life and education ==
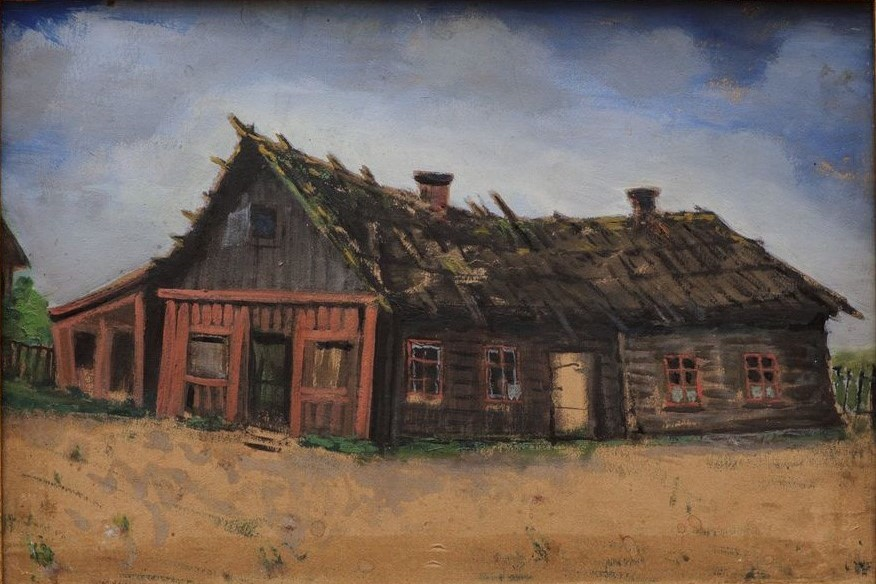
"The house where I was born", 1886–1890

Yudel Pen was born in 1854 in Novo-Aleksandrovsk (now Zarasai, Lithuania), to a poor Jewish family. His father, Movsha (or Moisei), died when Pen was four, leaving his Orthodox mother with ten children. He had a cheder education. Despite religious prohibitions against creating images, Pen showed an early talent for drawing and painting, that wasn't encouraged by his mother, who condemned the portraits he painted as "idolatry".

As a young man, Pen worked for five years as a house painter in Dvinsk (now Daugavpils, Latvia), where he met Borukh Gershovich, a Jewish student from the St. Petersburg Academy of Arts, who encouraged Pen to pursue formal art education. In 1879, at age 24, Pen moved to St. Petersburg to study at the Imperial Academy of Arts. Pen failed to pass the entry exams from the first attempt, and, as a Jew, he wasn't allowed to live in the capital. He had to bribe officials to stay illegally, and spent a year studying works in the Hermitage Museum before being admitted to the academy. Pen graduated with a silver medal, having been trained in the academic traditions of Realist art. Among his teachers in the academy were Pavel Chistyakov and Nikolay Laveretsky. Rembrandt was his favourite artist.

== Career ==
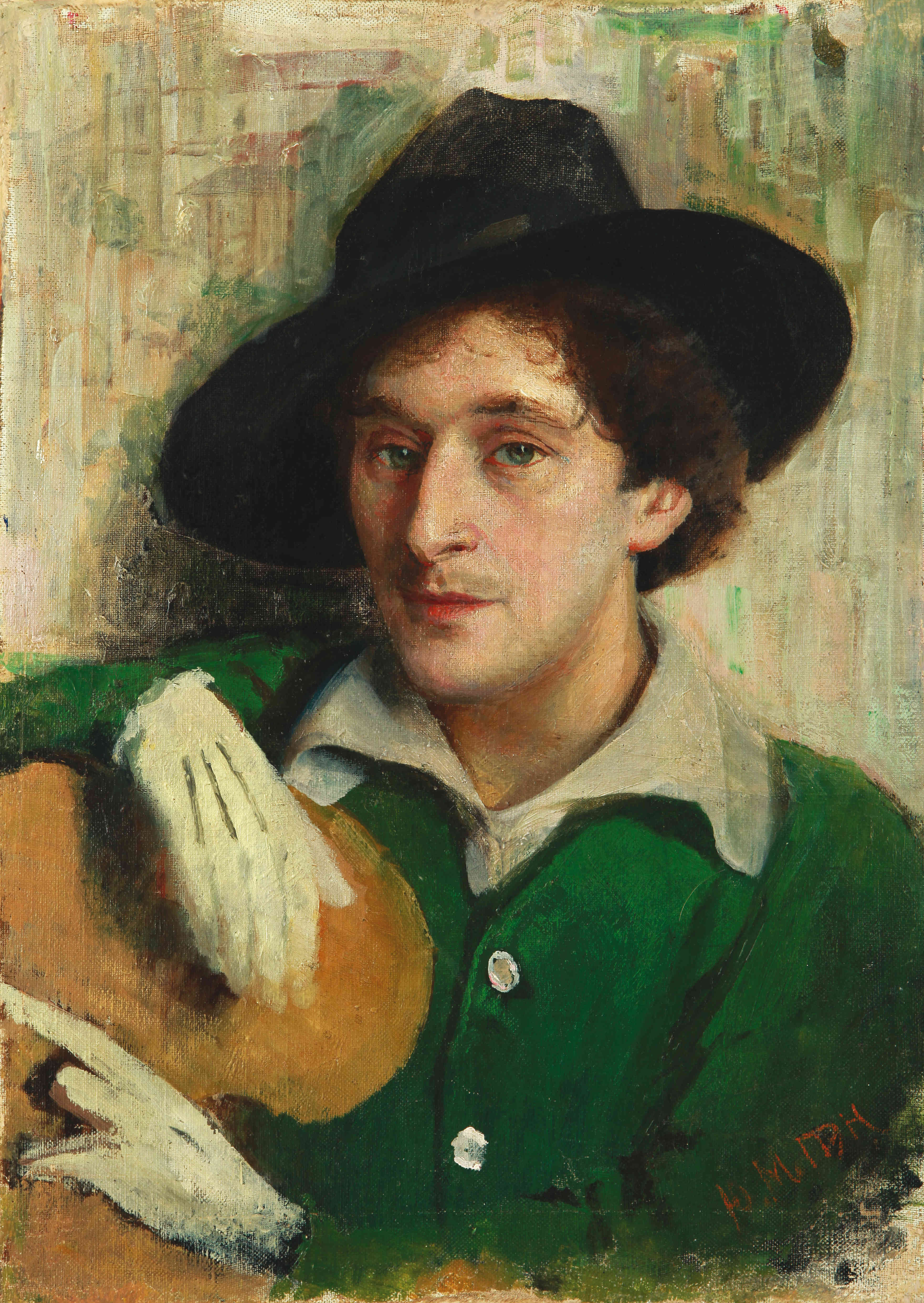
Marc Chagall, c. 1915

After graduation, Pen worked as a court painter for Baron Nikolai Korf in Kreitsburg. He stayed there for five years, and was "mostly unhappy because he had to paint from photographs". He visited Ilya Repin, who lived nearby in Zdrawneva. In 1891, he was invited to Vitebsk by the governor Vladimir Levashov, who offered him "a room at his governor’s mansion". Pen would spend the rest of his life in Vitebsk.

In 1897, Pen opened an art school in Vitebsk, mainly for Jewish children, many of whom didn't know Russian and spoke only Yiddish. The school was closed on Shabbat, and was under a patronage of Adolf Livenson, "the director of a large beer brewery". Pen followed an academic approach, and taught many poor children for free. In 1906, Marc Chagall, who was then 19 years old, started to study at the school. Pen's other famous students are El Lissitzky and Ossip Zadkine. Among his students were also Zair Azgur, Efim Minin, Solomon Yudovin, Elena Kabisher, David Yakerson, Lev Zevin, Ilya Mazel, Lev Leitman, Abel Pann, Polia Chentoff. According to Alexandra Shatskih, Pen always called himself by a Russified name "Yury Moiseevich". Pen often used German-Jewish magazine Ost und West "as a manual". It was the first Jewish art school in the Pale of Settlement.

Historian Galya Diment notes the importance of Pen's art school for his students:

Pen was no genius. His paintings are often static and rather lifeless. His palette seems to lack subtle shades of color. Where Chagall’s art creates lyrical poetry, Pen’s seemingly just recreates simple and prosaic everyday existence. ... Yet to his young and impressionable pupils who were surrounded by all these paintings as they were taking lessons from him, the lack of artistic perfection probably did not register. It was the sheer existence of these works in which you could almost hear the characters speak – or scream – in Yiddish, just like their families did, that mattered. ...Pen's gift to them was not a particular style of painting but a much-needed assurance that, as Jews, they could still be serious, respected artists who did not have to shy away from Jewish subjects. In short, he gave them a role model...

Pen was a Realist painter, and even though his students became known for avant-garde paintings, he did not approve "Cubism and Futurism". Pen primarily created realist paintings depicting everyday Jewish life in the Pale of Settlement. His subjects included craftsmen, scholars, and scenes of religious and family life. Notable works include "A Letter to America" (1920s), "Children Refugees" (1915), "Get" (Divorce, 1907), "Der Fraynd" (A Friend), and "Haynt" (Today). While not stylistically innovative, Pen was groundbreaking in his consistent focus on contemporary Jewish subjects. Pen is compared to and sometimes called "the Sholem Aleichem of painting".

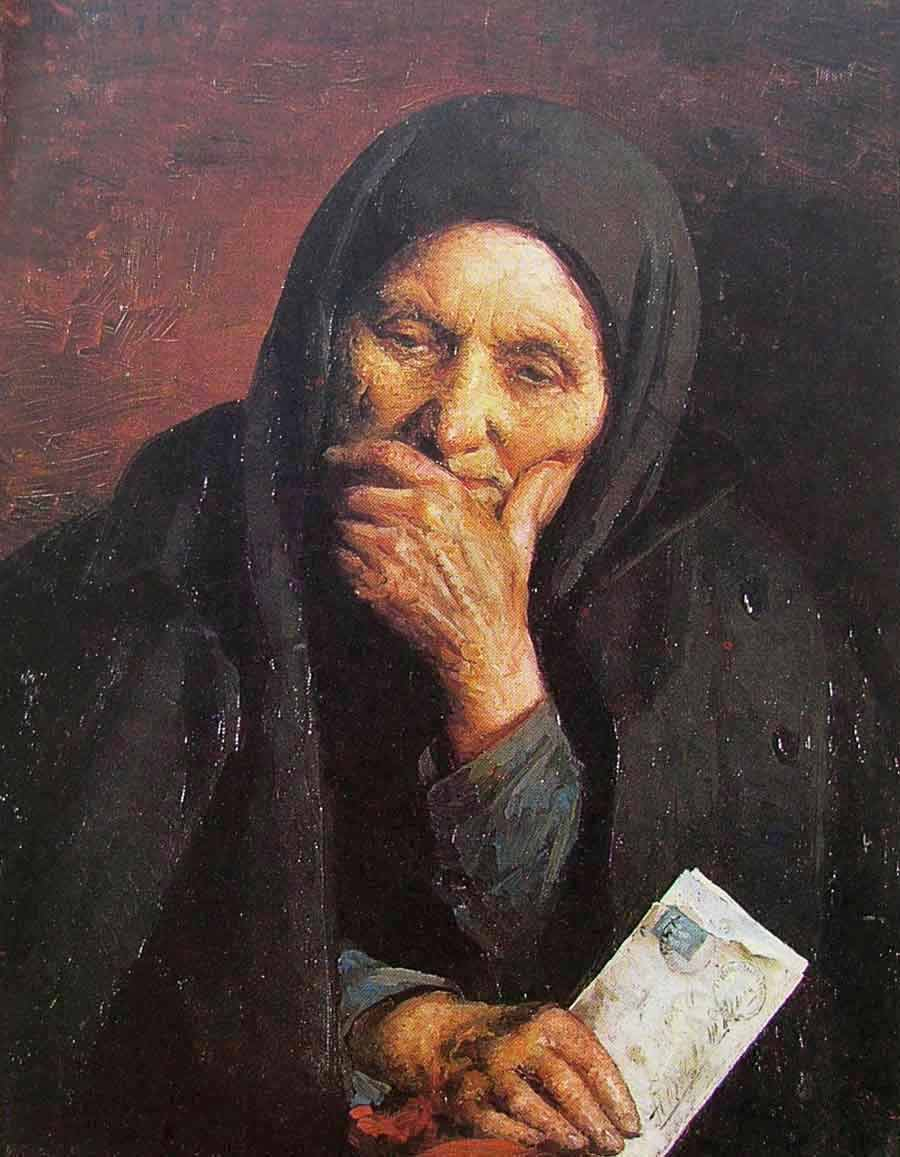
Letter from America, 1903

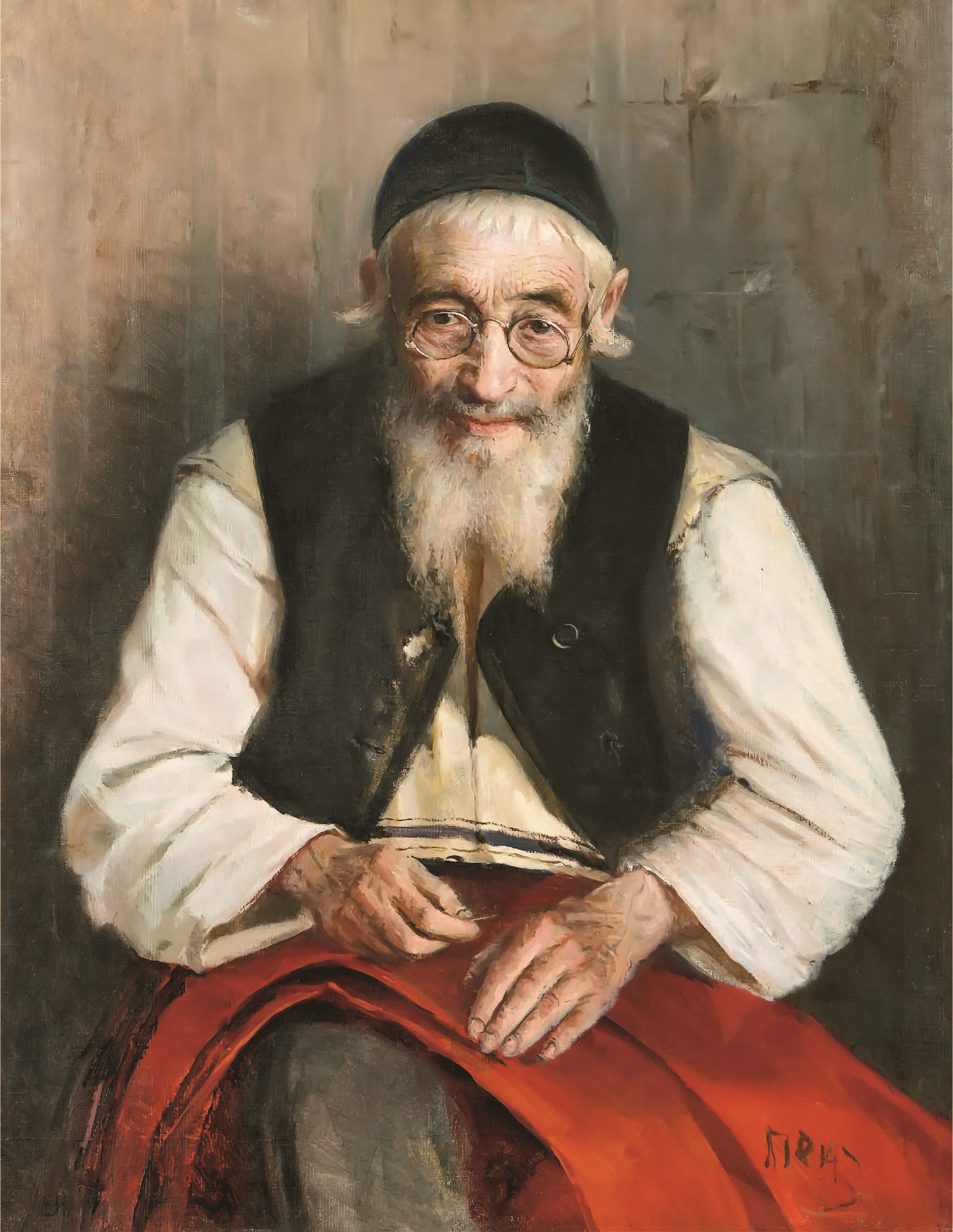
Old Tailor, c. 1910

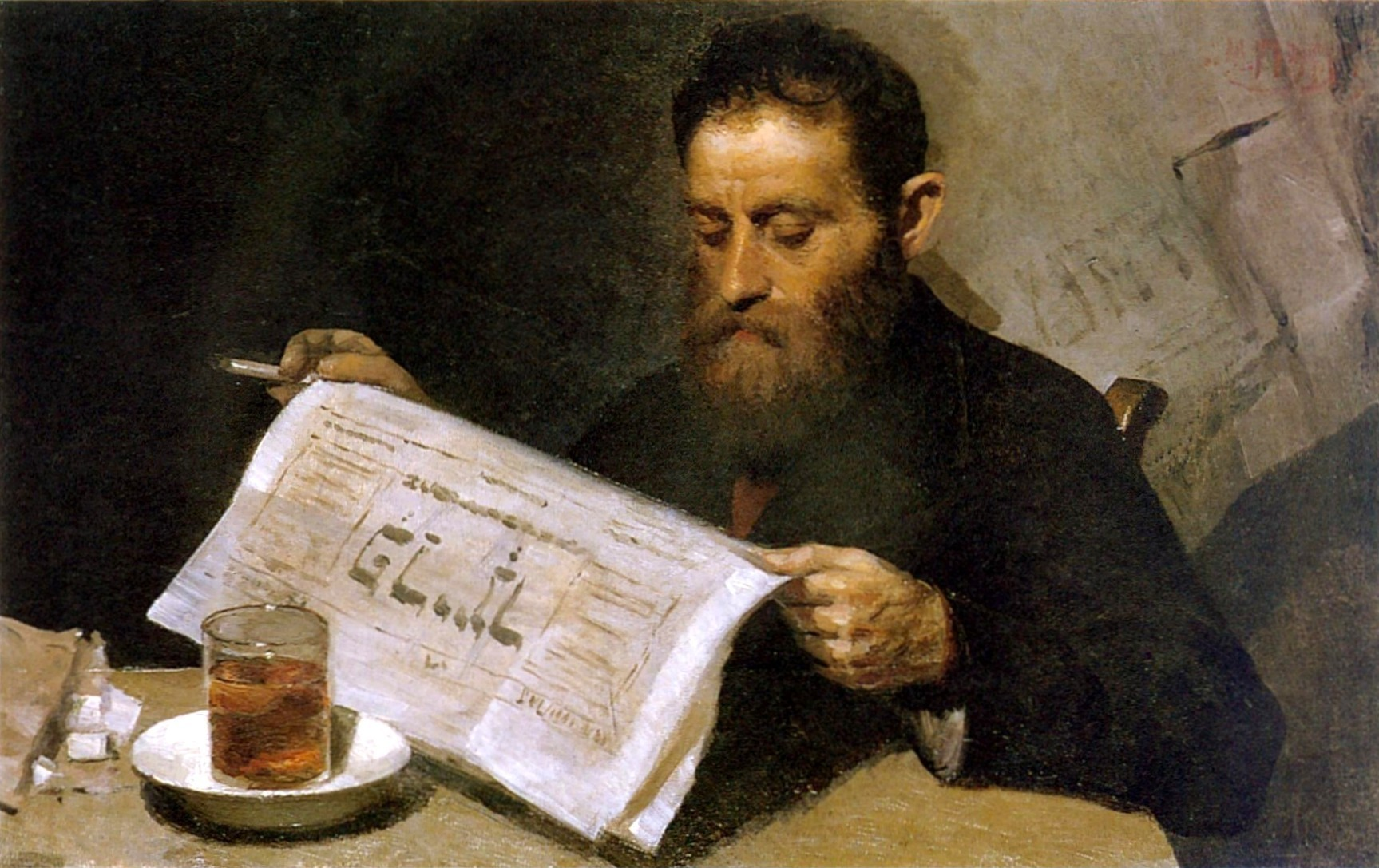
Reading a Newspaper, 1910s

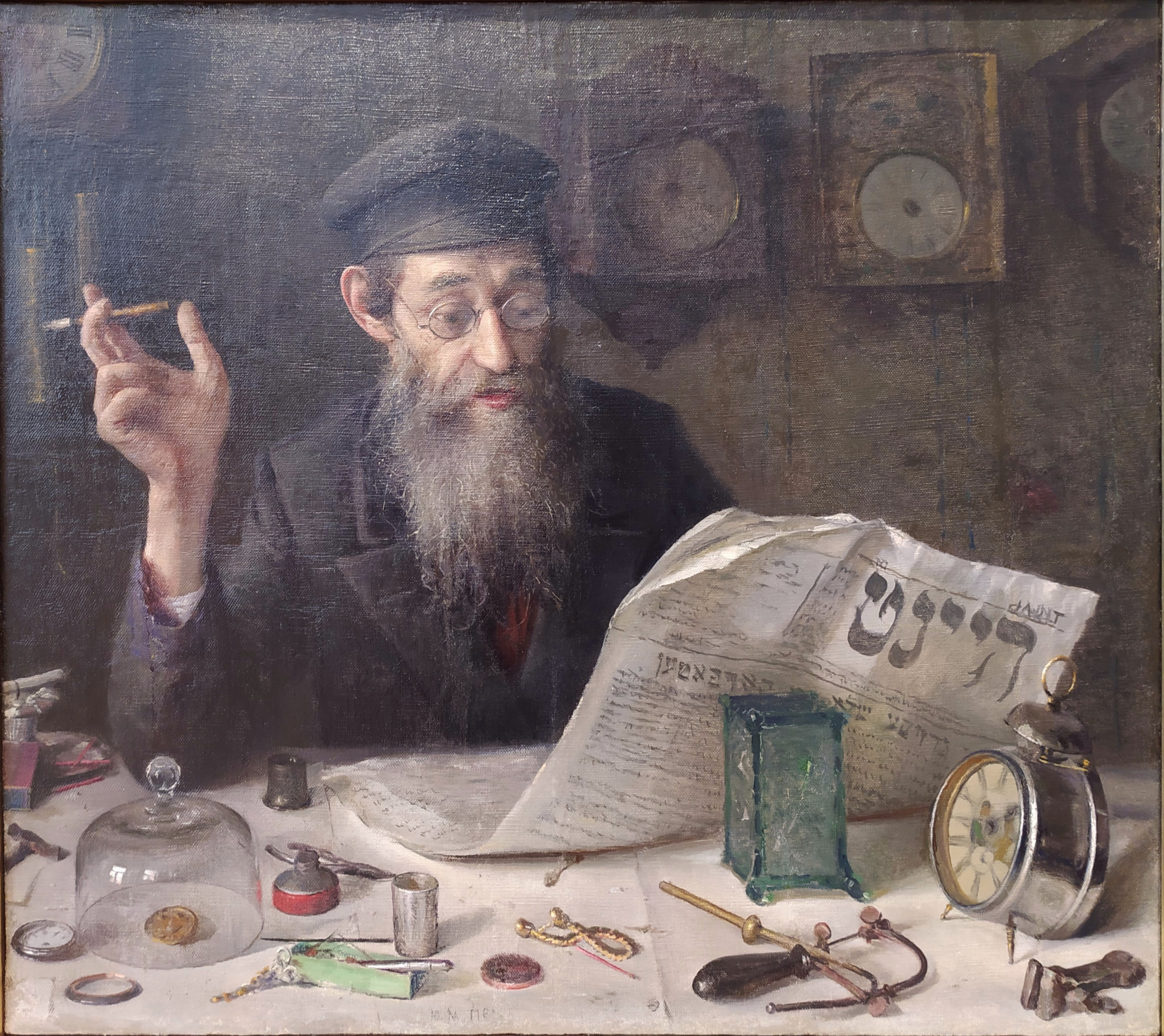
Clockmaker, 1914

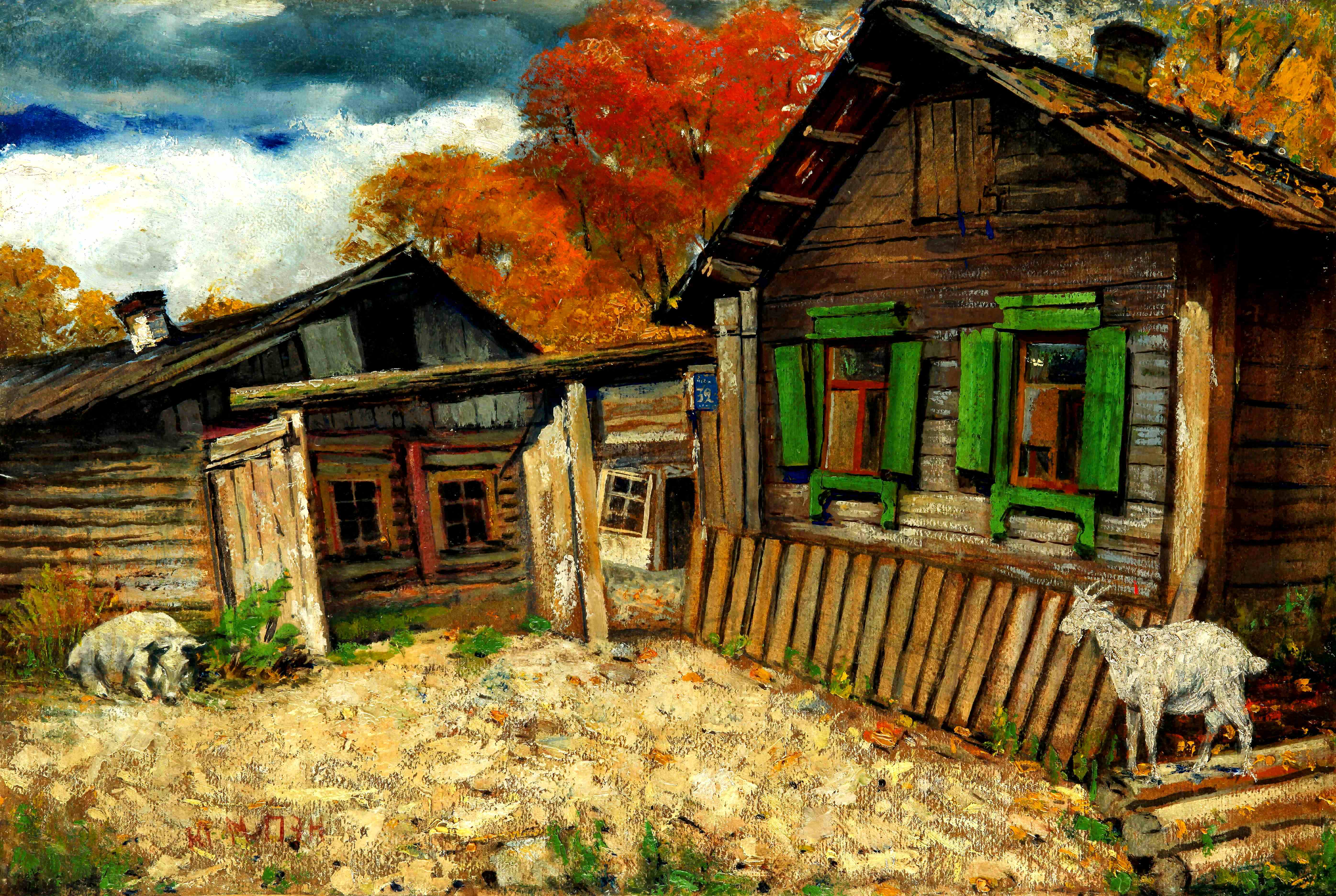
House with a Goat, 1920s

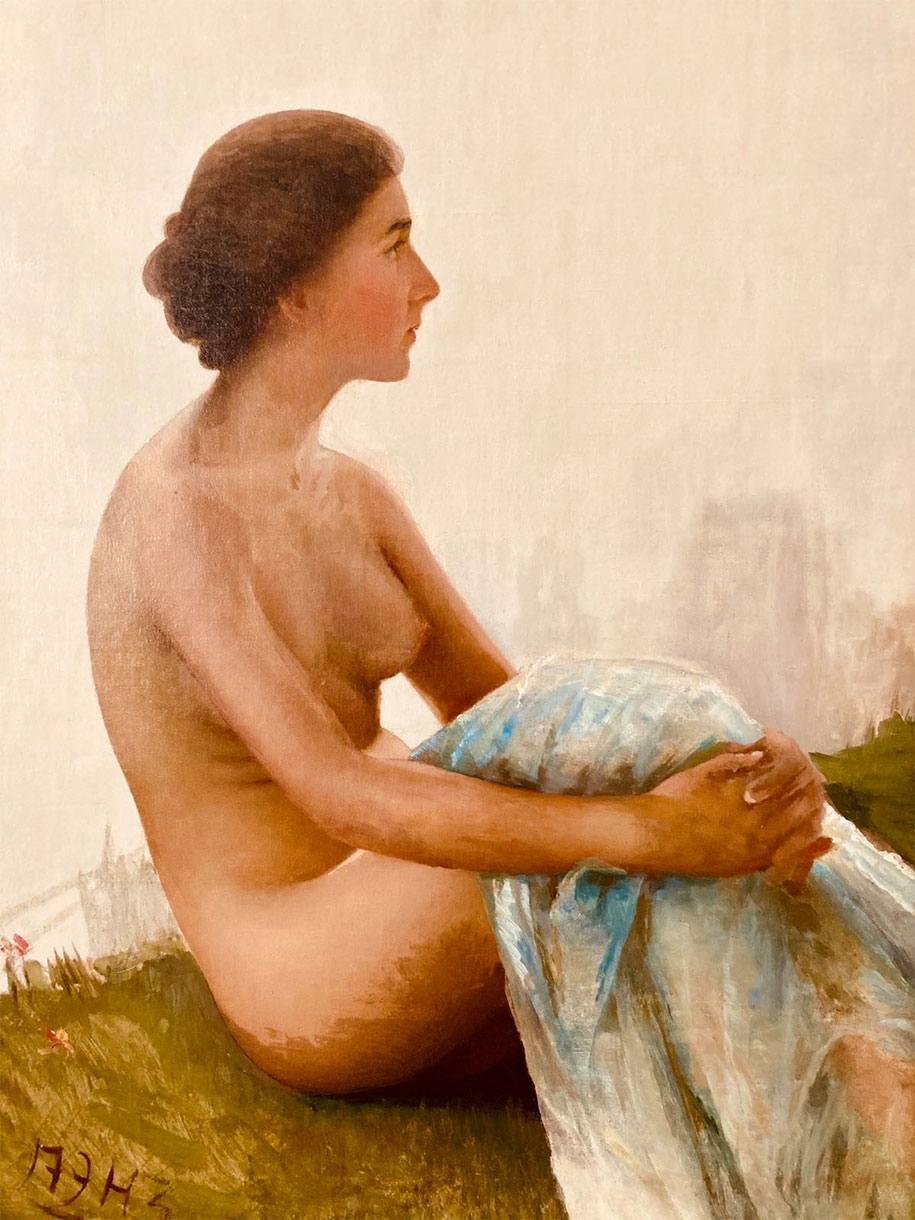
Portrait of an unknown woman, 1900s

Pen often draw inhabitants of Vitebsk, and was especially fond of drawing young women. According to Chagall, "[t]here was not a single beautiful young woman whom Pen, once she had reached the age of 20, did not invite to pose for him in any way she wished. If it was possible to include her breasts – so much the better."

After World War I, Pen visited his students Zadkine and Chagall in Paris, but he did not want to move there from Vitebsk.

== Later life and Soviet era ==
After the October Revolution of 1917, Pen briefly taught at the Vitebsk People's Art College by invitation from Chagall. He resigned in 1920 due to ideological conflicts he and Chagall had with Kazimir Malevich.

In the 1920s and 1930s, Pen participated in several exhibitions in Minsk and Moscow. While he continued to focus on Jewish subjects, some of his works acquired a Soviet veneer, such as "A Komsomol Shoemaker Reading a Newspaper" (1925). In 1930, he was invited to exhibit in Berlin, but was not allowed to go by the Soviet authorities, even after his students and friends tried to help him.

Pen had a two-room apartment in Vitebsk. One room served as his workshop and study, while the other was his living room. Pen never married; he lived with his sister, who died in 1931. Out of all his students, Chagall was especially fond of his old teacher, and sent him letters from Paris even in the 1930s, when it was not encouraged by the Soviets and was risky for the Soviet citizens. Chagall tried to convince Pen to emigrate and settle in Paris, or at least to send his works there "for safekeeping". In 1928, Solomon Yudovin, also his former student, who became the director of the Leningrad Jewish Historical and Ethnographical Museum, tried to convince Pen to give his paintings to the permanent collection of the museum. Pen also corresponded with other students; Ossip Zadkine sent him a letter when he served in France during the World War I. He also had many years of correspondence with Elena Kabisher-Yakerson.

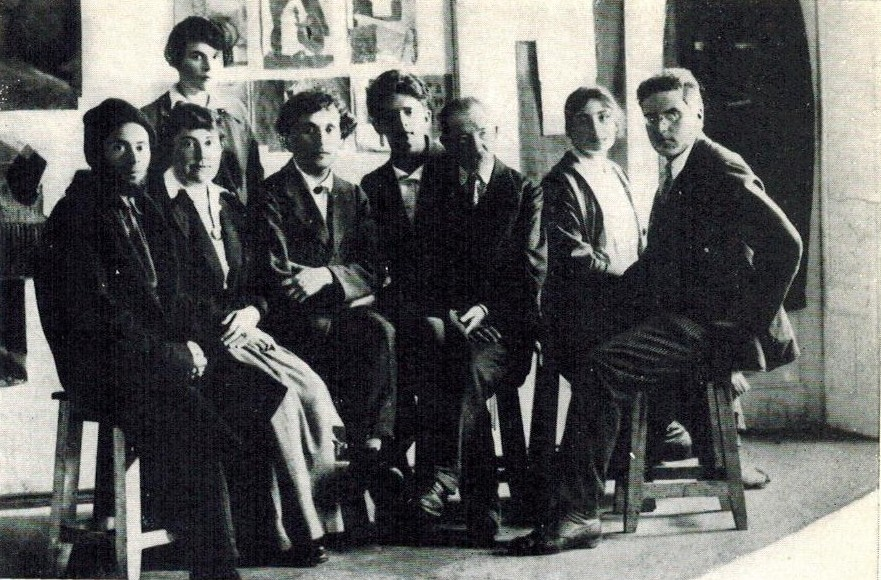
Professors at the People's Art School in Vitebsk, July 26, 1919. From left to right: Lazar Lissitzky, Vera Ermolaeva, Marc Chagall, David Yakerson, Yury Pen, Nina Kogan, and Alexander Romm

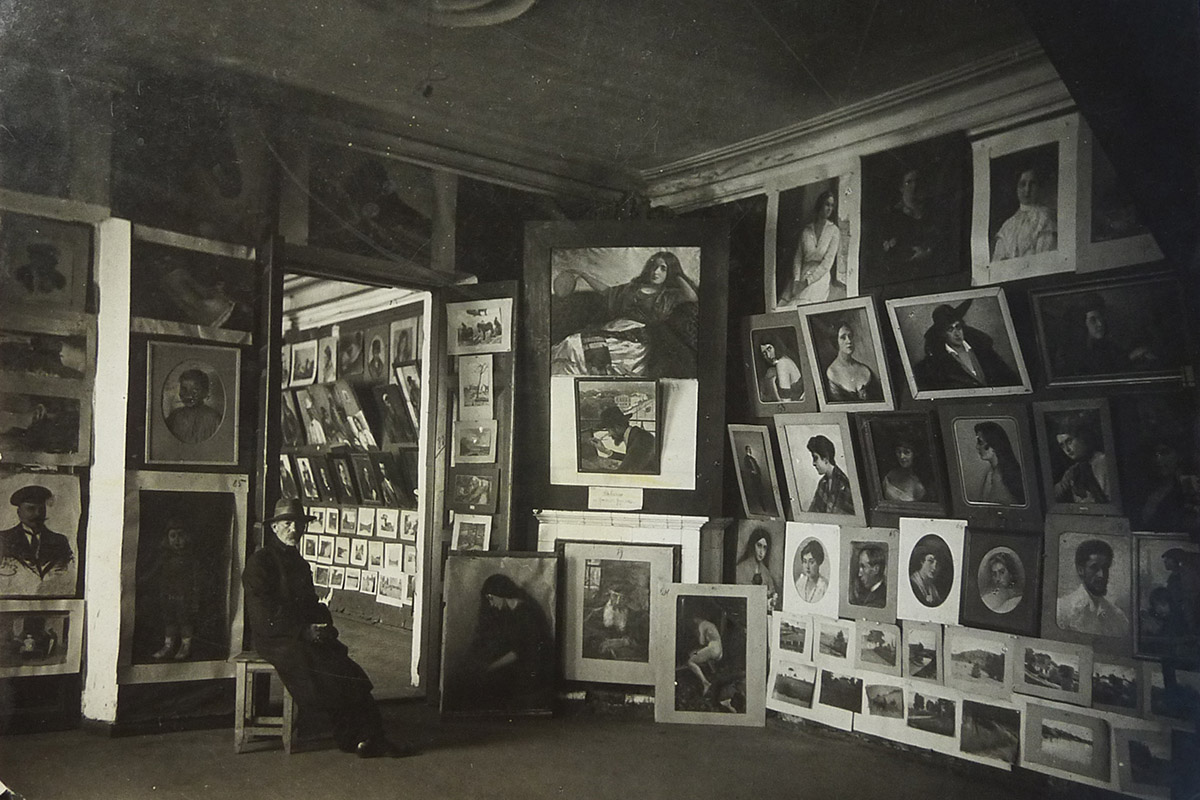
Pen in his workshop, 1920s

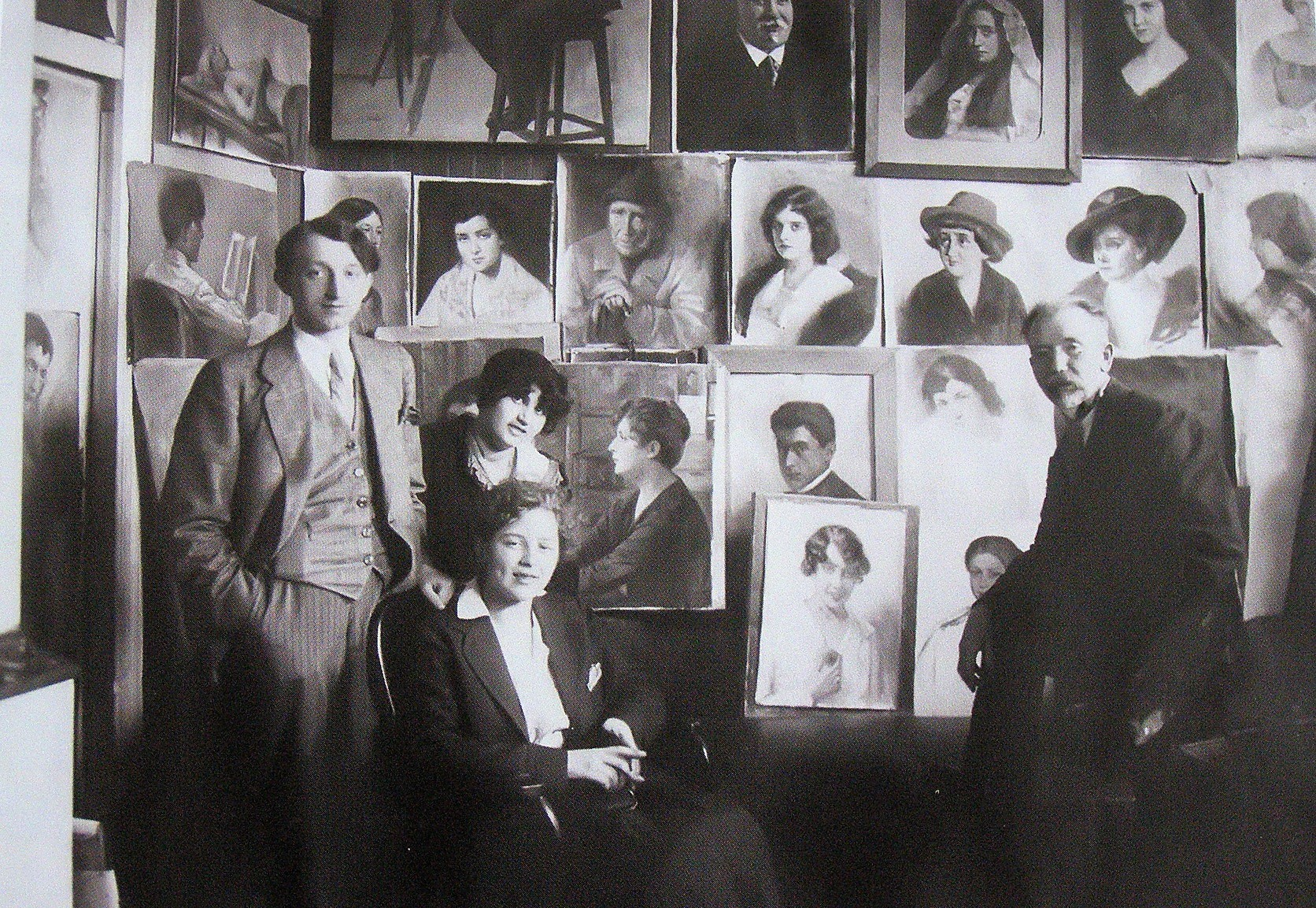
Pen with his students, 1920s

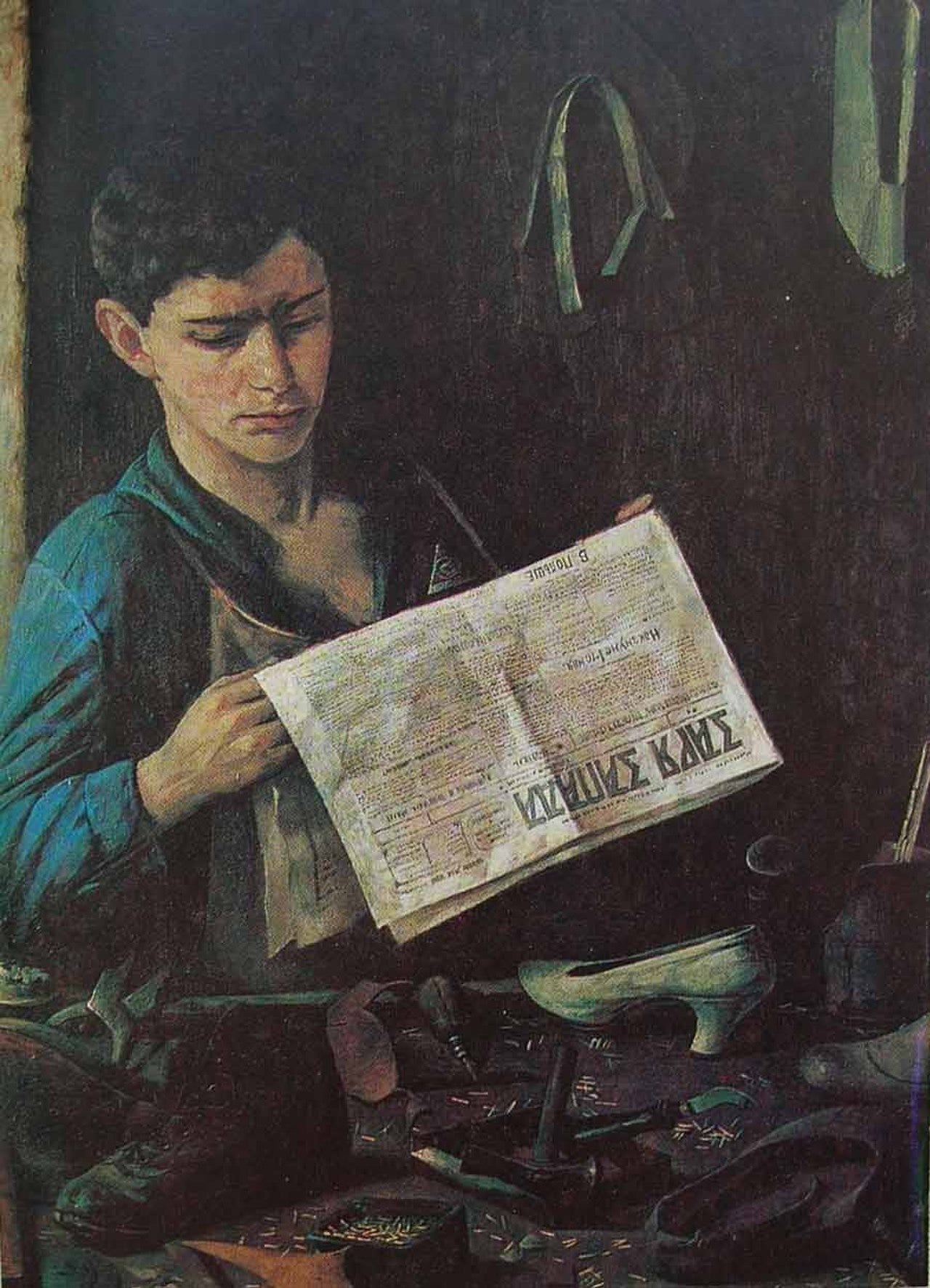
"A Komsomol Shoemaker Reading a Newspaper", 1925

== Death and legacy ==
Fate has thrown me far from my native ruins. But no matter how different our art is, I will never forget his trembling figure. He lives in my memory as a father. And often when I think about the deserted streets of my town, he appears now here, now there … And I cannot help begging you: do remember his name.

— Marc Chagall, 1927

Pen was murdered with an axe in his own home during the night of February 28/March 1, 1937. While officially attributed to robbery, his students believed that he was killed by NKVD during the Stalin's purges. His niece, some other relative, and a former student were arrested and convicted for the murder. None of the painting were stolen from his house, and Pen had no money.

An alternative version suggests that Pen was killed by the Vitebsk NKVD chief who had convicted his relatives. According to this account, the motive stemmed from Pen's refusal "to sell him a painting of a nude" that he particularly desired. Some versions of this theory claim "the nude in question" was actually a depiction of the chief's wife.

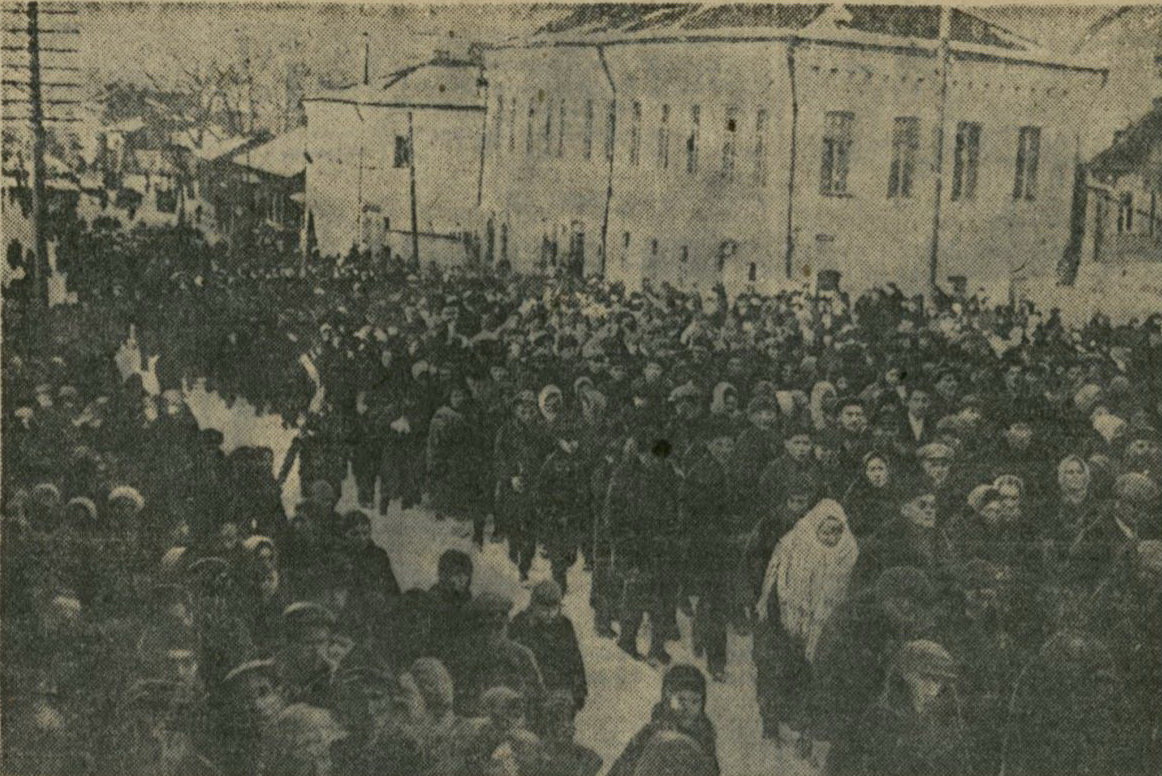
Pen's funeral in Vitebsk was attended by thousands of people.

Chagall could not attend the funeral; he wrote a short poem about Pen's murder:

My teacher is no more,
his beard is no more,
his easel is no more. An evil monster killed him, having slyly appeared at his place.
And a black horse forever
took this old rebbe somewhere to the other world.

Pen became mostly forgotten, and not widely known outside Belarus. Many of Pen's estimated 800 paintings were lost during World War II. The surviving works are split between the National Art Museum in Minsk and the Vitebsk Regional Museum of Local History.

== Gallery ==
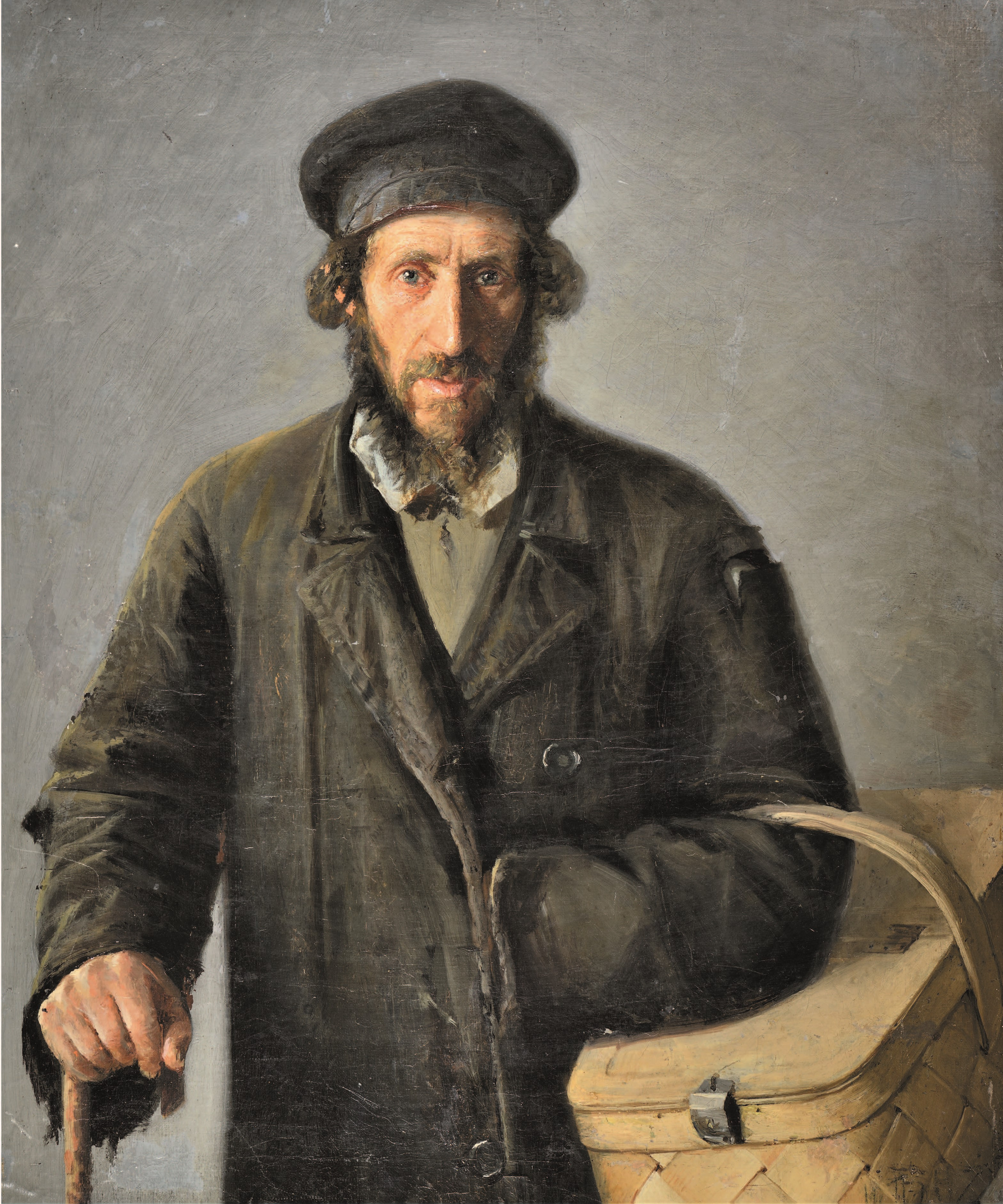
An old man with a basket, 1892

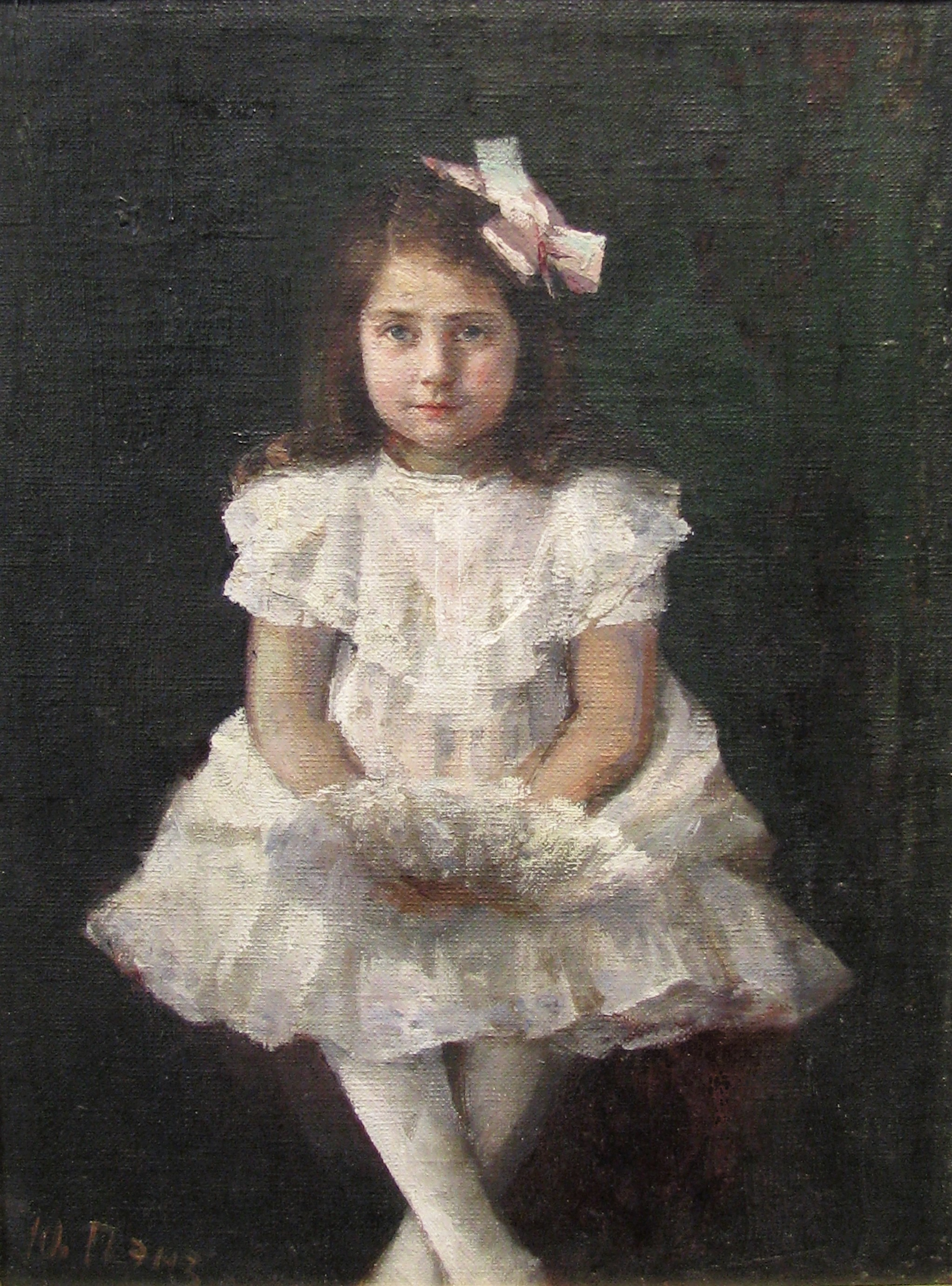
Portrait of Lidzija Kon, 1903

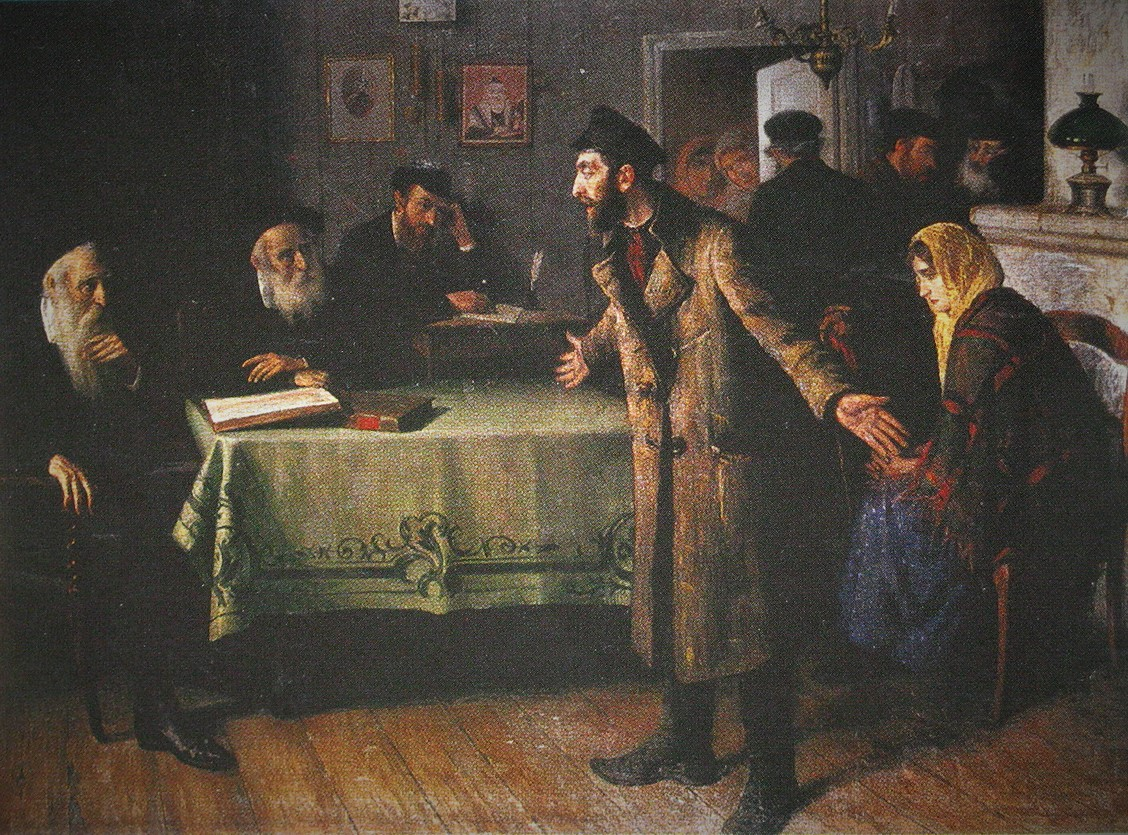
Divorce, 1907

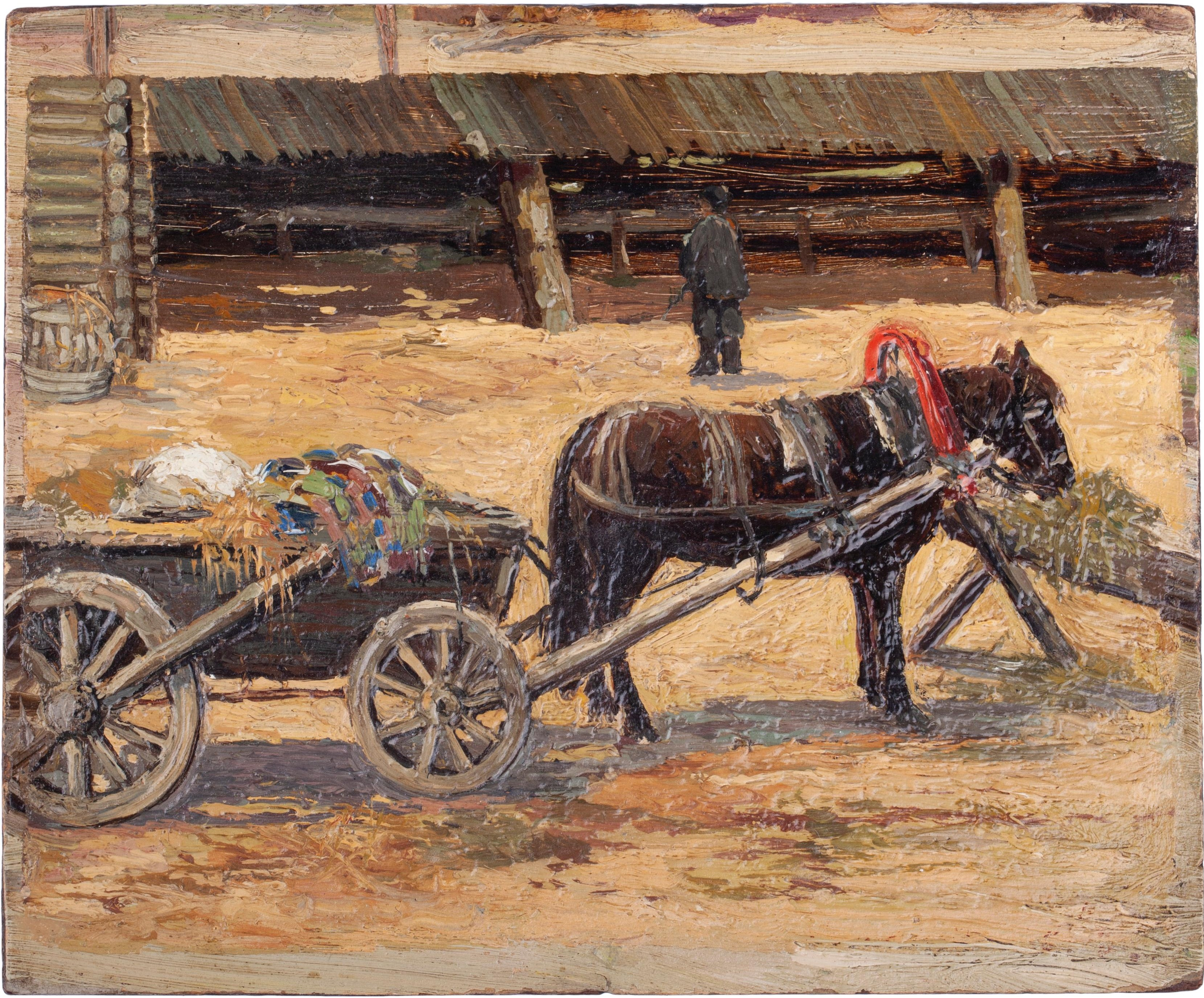
Farmstead, c. 1916

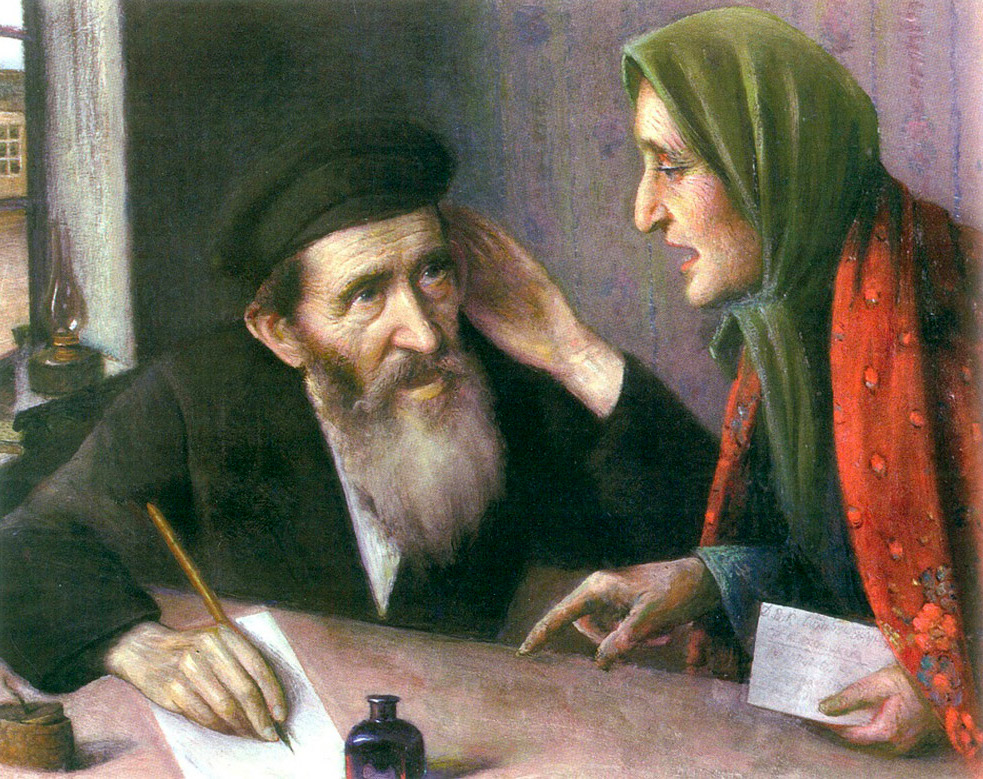
Letter to America, 1920s

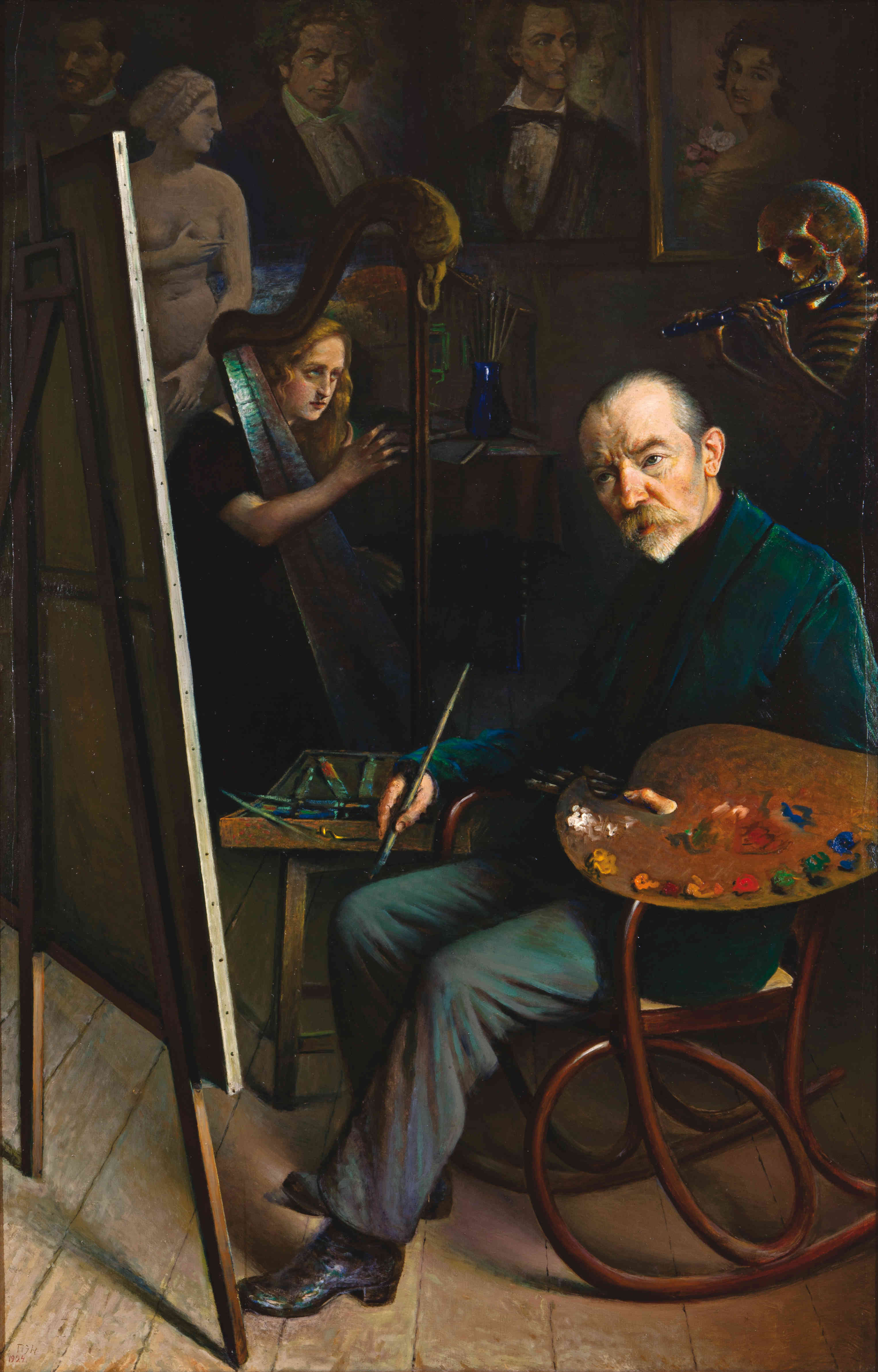
Self-portrait with Muse and Death, 1925

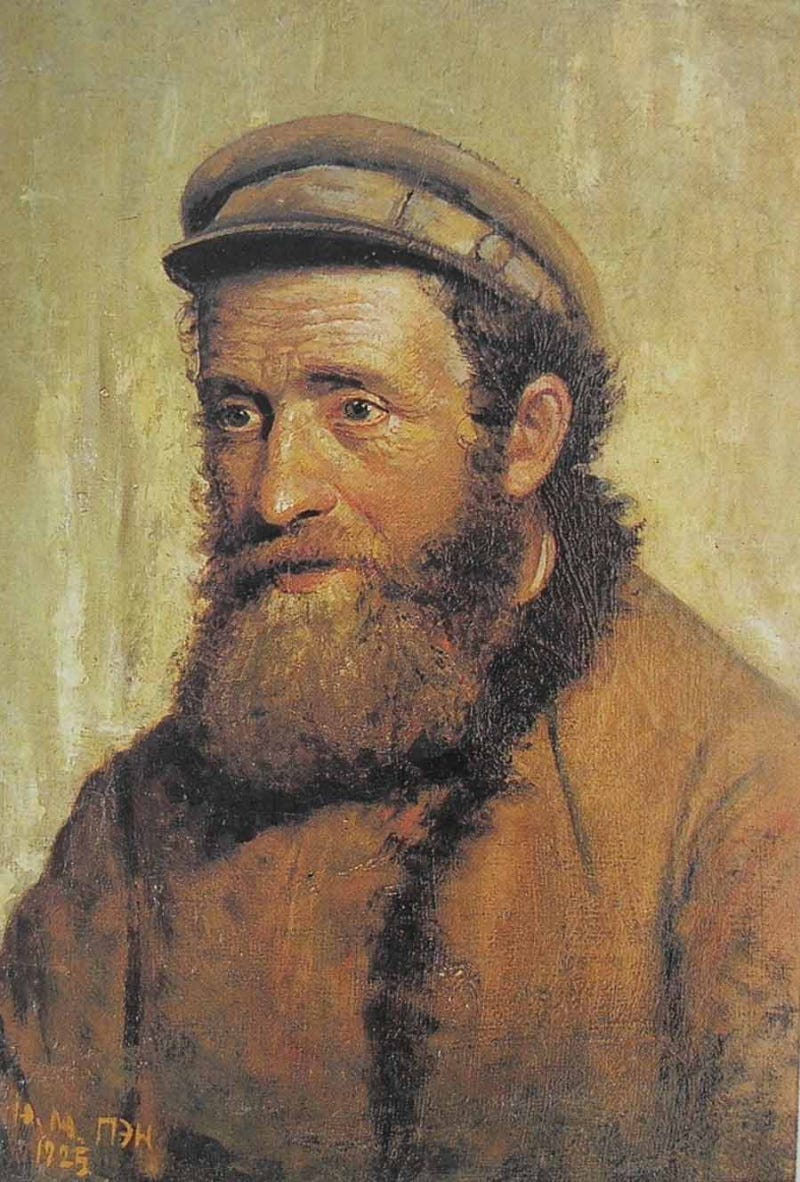
Portrait of a man, 1925

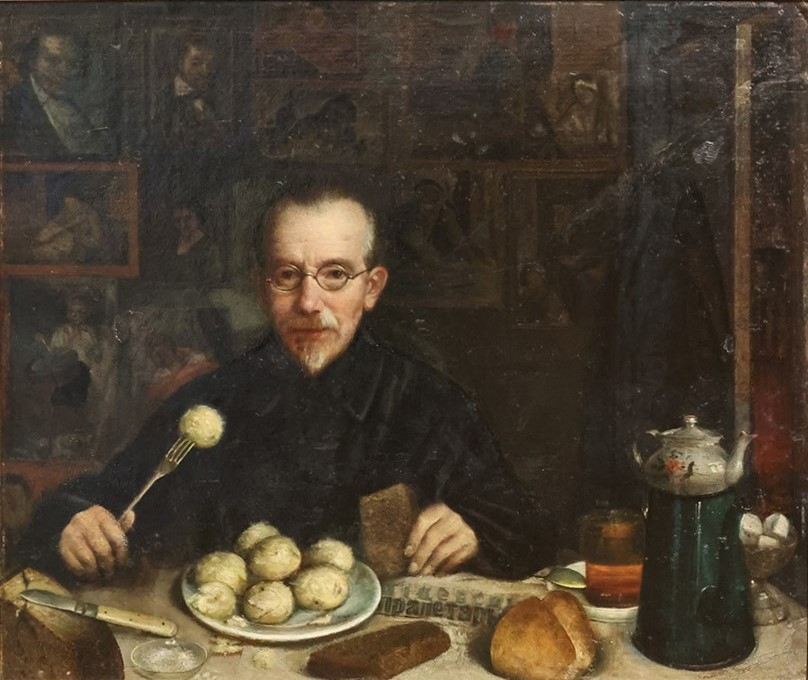
Breakfast, self-portrait, 1932

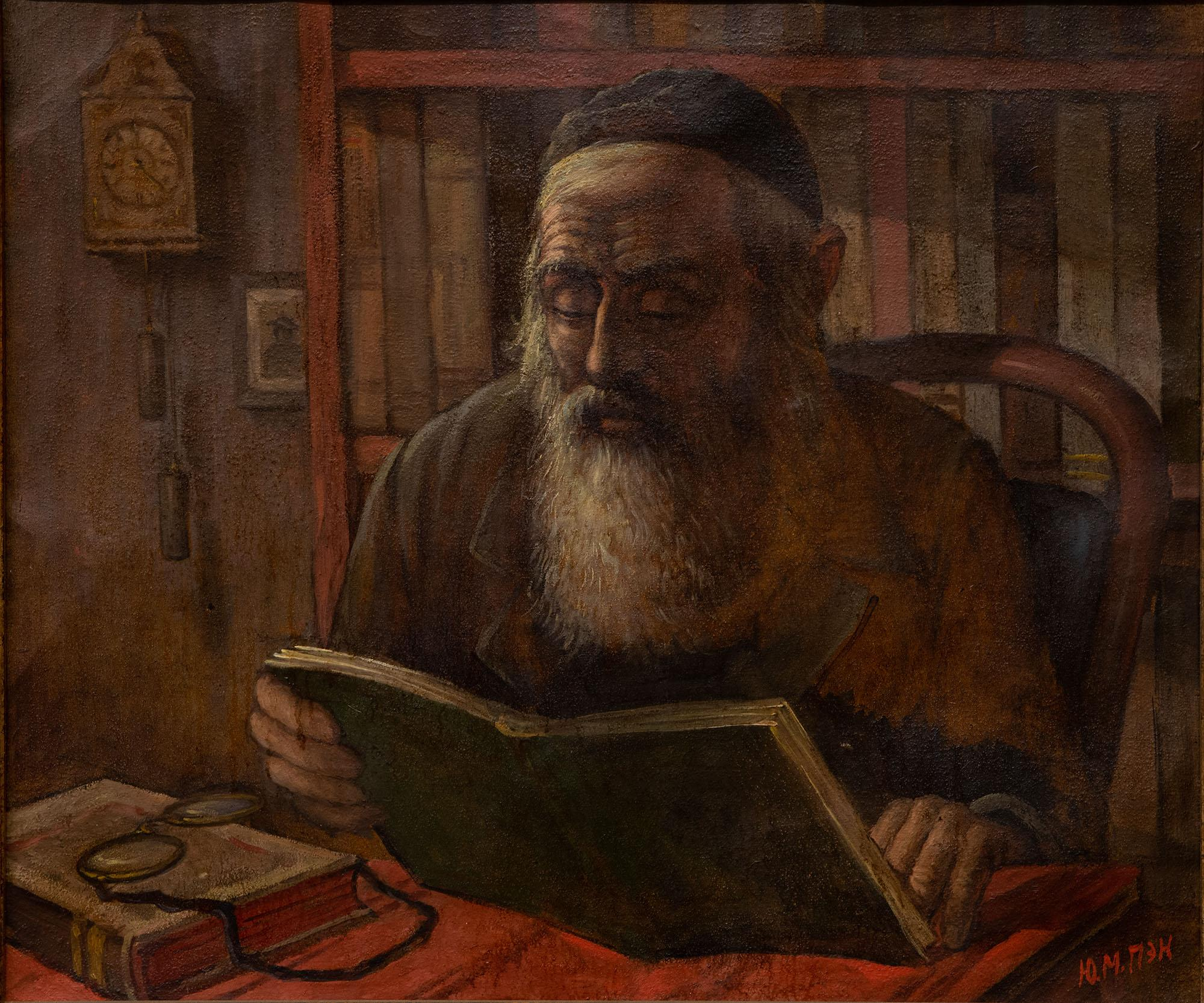
Torah Study

== Sources ==
- Шатских, Александра (2001). Витебск. Жизнь искусства. 1917–1922 (in Russian). Litres. ISBN 978-5-04-099198-3.
