= Ilya Mazel =

Russian and Soviet Jewish painter

Ilya (Ruvim) Mazel (24 January 1890 – 4 July 1967) was a Russian and Soviet Jewish painter. He gained fame for his pioneering work with oriental motifs in the 1920s. He is also known for his series of paintings based on biblical themes and his illustrations for the short stories of Anton Chekhov.

Mazel's studied under Yehuda Pen, and during this period was a classmate of Marc Chagall.
