= Vitebsk Regional History Museum =

Museum in Vibetsk, Belarus

Coordinates: 55°11′44″N 30°12′21″E

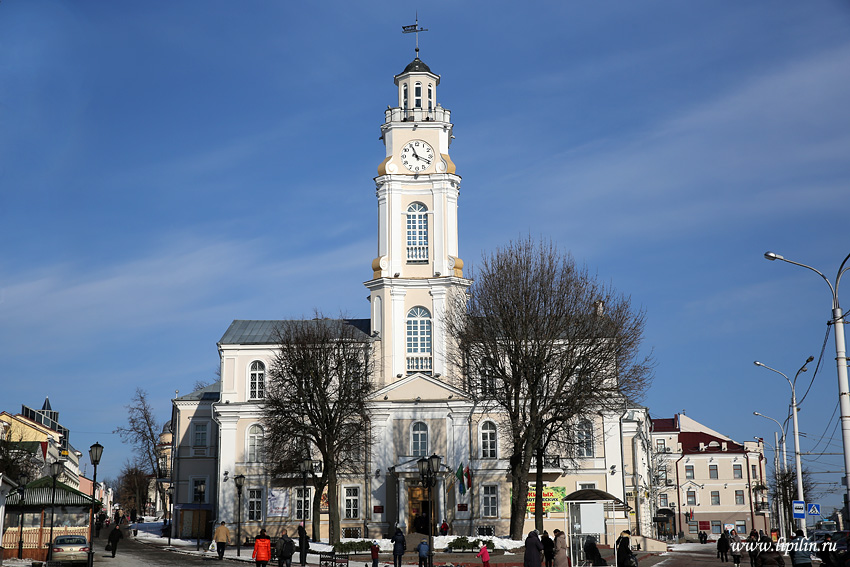
Vitebsk City Hall, site of the museum

The Vitebsk Regional History Museum (Belarusian: Віцебскі абласны краязнаўчы музей, Russian: Витебский областной краеведческий музей) is a museum in Vitebsk, Belarus.

== History ==
Its history begins in the 19th Century, when in 1868 the city opened its first museum in through the Governmental Statistics Committee. In 1918 the Vitebsk Governmental Museum was created through the donations of the private collection of A. Brodovskiy. In 1924 the Vitebsk Department Belgos museum opened, aggregating the previous collections of the Church Archeology Museum, the Vitebsk Archival Commission's Museum, the History Museum of Vitebsk Statistics Committee, and the private collections of V. Fedorovich and A. Brodovski. Also in 1924, it moved to its current location in the city hall, whose 18th century architecture is a symbol of Vitebsk.

== Exhibits ==
The museum contains over 200000 items, among them exhibits such as: brevets of the 18th century; books of the 17th and 18th centuries; weapons from the Patriotic War of 1812; a collection of local embroidery from the 18th and 19th centuries; as well as many materials from the World War II. Also of interest the collections of numismatics, of ancient weapons, and masonic items. In the art section there are works Ilya Repin, Isaac Levitan, Ivan Shishkin, Ivan Khrutski, Makovski, Yehuda Pen as well as modern Vitebsk artists.

Aside from the main museum in the city hall, the museum also includes artistic and literary affiliates, as well as museums of private collections, Ilya Repin's Zdravnevo Manor museum, and an exposition in the former Sicherheitsdienst prison dedicated to Vitebsk's patriots.

=== Literary museum ===
The literary museum includes exhibitions of ancient illustrations and books, as well as letters, photographs, portraits, and possessions of various authors. Also exhibited are local legends, as well as known writers whose lives and creativity were connected with Vitebsk.

=== Vitebsk patriots museum ===
The Vitebsk patriots museum is located in the cellars of the former Nazi Sicherheitsdienst prison, which was in operation between 1941 and 1944. The photographic documentary and materials tell of Vitebsk in the period of occupation, and the patriots tortured there (such as Vera Khoruzhaya).

=== The museum of private collections ===
This museum includes private collections such as Belarusian coins, Russian medals, Soviet memorial medals, as well as awards of various countries.

=== "Zdravnevo" Manor museum ===
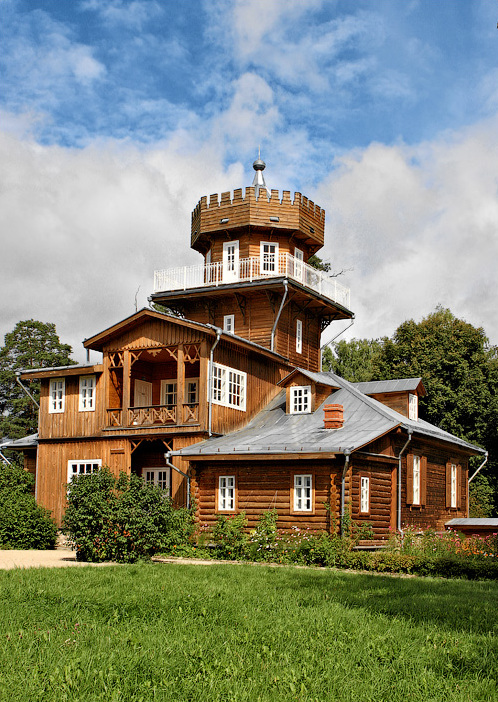
Repin's country house "Zdravnevo", Belarus.

"Zdravnevo" Manor museum exhibits the life and art of Ilya Repin who, between 1892 and 1902, conducted summer seasons in the country manor "Zdravnevo". Inside the manor are reproductions of paintings by the artist, as well as letters, documents, and a few original specimens belonging to his family.

=== Artistic museum ===
The Artistic museum displays a unique and diversified collection consisting of more 7000 exhibits. Included are collections of icons, paintings, sketches, and sculptures of popular and decorative art. The pride of museum are works of Yehuda Pen, the first teacher of Marc Chagall.
