= Alex Salaueu =

Belarusian painter (1926–2021)

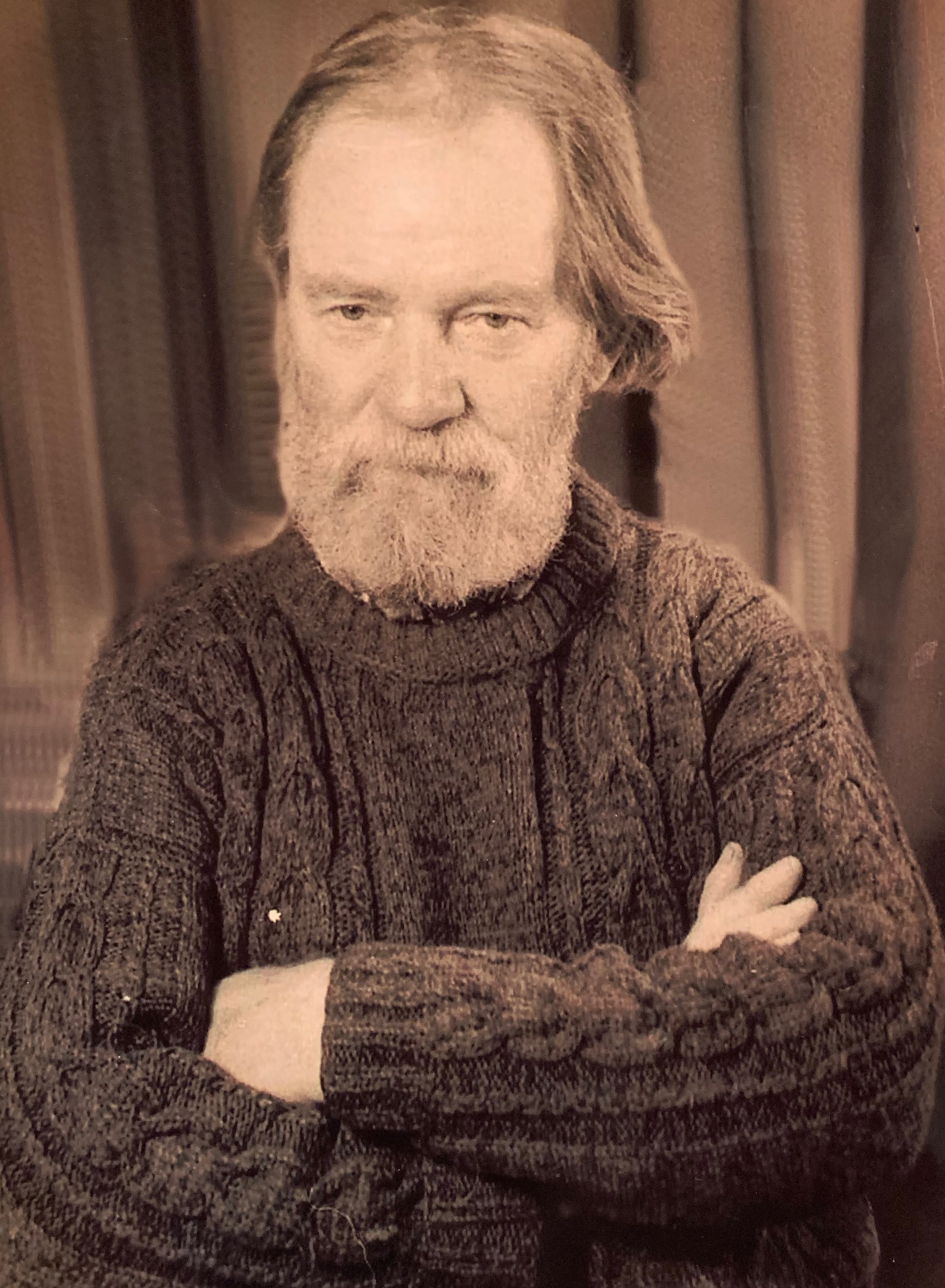
- Salaueu at his studio, 1976
- Born: September 13, 1926; Soloni village, Novgorodsky Uyezd, Novgorod Governorate, Russian SFSR, Soviet Union
- Died: May 23, 2021 (aged 94); Vitebsk, Belarus
- Education: Vitebsk Academy of Fine Arts,
- Known for: Painting
- Movement: Abstract expressionism, Expressionism

Alex Salaueu (Note: Alternatively Aleksander Soloviev, Solovyov, Solovjev, or Solovyev; Belarusian: Аляксандр Аляксандравіч Салаўёў, romanized: Alaksandr Alaksandravič Sałaŭjoŭ, Russian: Александр Александрович Соловьёв, romanized: Aleksandr Aleksandrovich Solovyov) (September 13, 1926 – May 23, 2021) was a Belarusian Avant-garde artist. Few works have survived from his extensive artistic repertoire, estimated at nearly 5000 creations. The majority of his work, especially his lyrical abstract works, stem from the latter part of his career. The latest are held by museums and discerning collectors. Salaueu was a Member of the Union of Artists of the Republic of Belarus and an Honored Artist of the Byelorussian SSR (1982).

== Biography ==
In 1943–1944, at the age of 17, he participated in the partisan movement, from 1944 he was in the army and took part in the battles in the Baltic States and on the Karelian Isthmus. Subsequently, Alex Salaueu was awarded the Order of the Red Star, as well as commemorative medals in honor of the Victory in the Great Patriotic War.

Alex Salaueu was in 1945 - 1949 in Tallinn, he met many times Ado Vabbe who initiated him in Art and recommended he pursue painting abstract. After demobilization in 1949, the artist went to his mother in Madona, Latvia. In 1955 he entered Saint Petersburg Art and Industry Academy to the department of masters of monumental-decorative painting. After graduation he worked for some time as a teacher of drawing in high school in Madona. He graduated from Leningrad Higher Art and Industrial College named after V. Mukhina (1957), Belarusian Theatre and Art Institute (1965). From 1965, he worked as a production designer at the Y. Kolas National Academic Drama Theater, and later (until 1995) - as his main artist. Since 1966, Alex Salaueu became a member of the Union of Artists of the USSR.

In 1968-1969 he was the chairman of the artistic council of the Vitebsk art production workshops.

He became a member of Belarusian Union of Artists (1966).

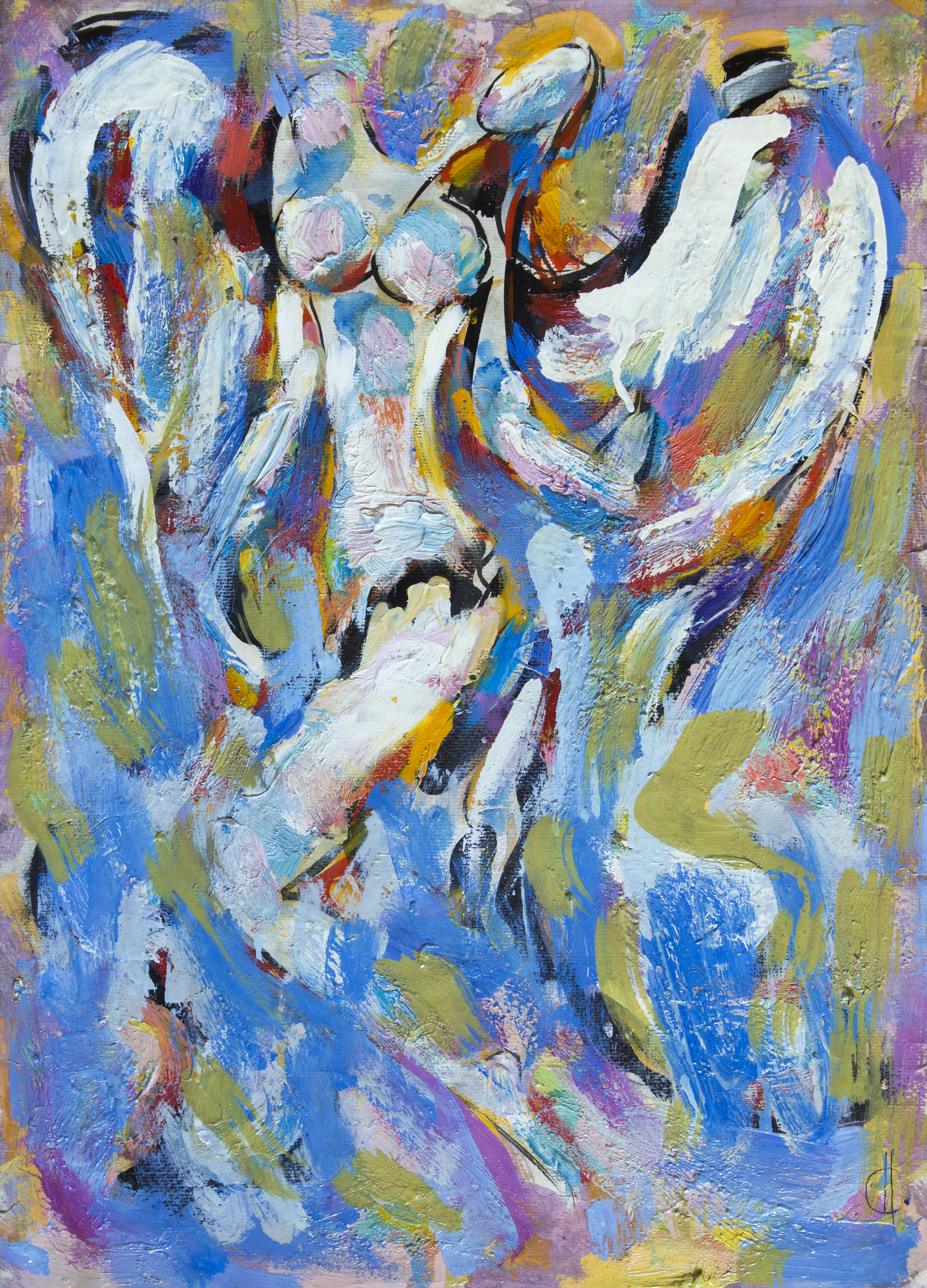
Alex Salaueu "Muse" Courtesy of ArtSTAC

He worked in theatre-decorative art, easel painting and graphics. He has designed more than 100 performances, including «Symon the Musician» by Yakub Kolas (1976), «Kastus Kalinouski» by V. Karatkevich (1978), «Threshold» by A. Dudarev (1982), «Romeo and Juliet» by William Shakespeare (1986), «Mudromer» by N. Matukovsky (1988), «Love and Intrigue» by A. Petrushevskaya (1989) and others.

== Recognition ==
From 1973 to 1977, Salaueu served Chairman of the Board of the Vitebsk regional organization of the Union of Artists of the BSSR.

In 1982, he was awarded the title of Honored Artist of the Byelorussian SSR.

In 2017, Salaueu was awarded the Order of Francis Skaryna in accordance with the presidential decree for many years of fruitful work, including significant personal contribution to the development of art and culture of Belarus.

== Art development ==
The arrival of Salaueu to Vitebsk is considered by some to mark the appearance of the post-war urban avant-garde. As an artist who grew up on the classical school and world models of realism, Salaueu studied various abstract and realistic systems, and also began to combine realism with abstract art. During his work, the artist designed more than eight hundred performances in Vitebsk and more than a hundred in various theaters in Belarus and abroad.

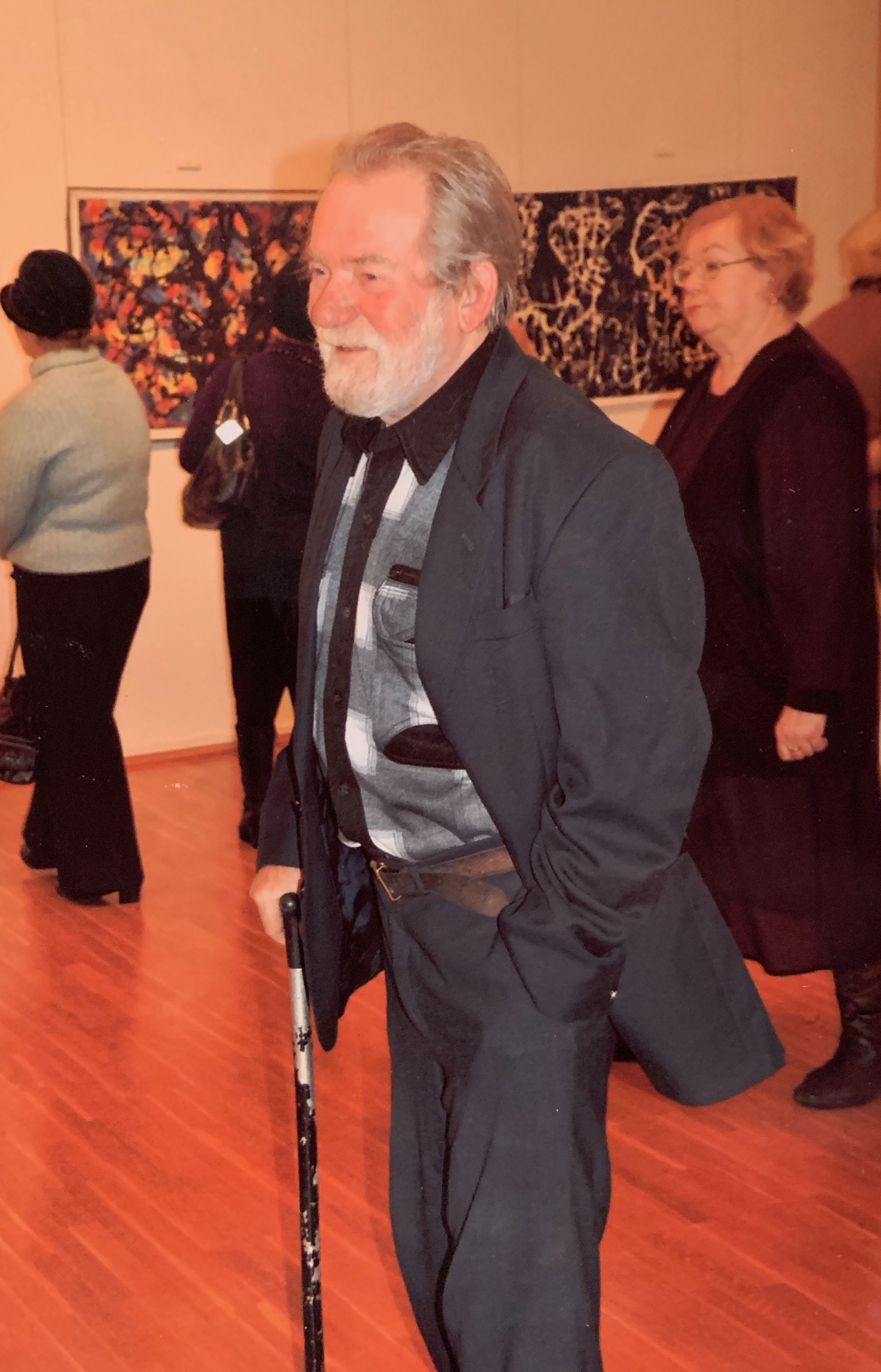
Salaueu at his exhibition, 2017

He was an active participant in city, regional, republican and international exhibitions. Also his works were exhibited in Russia, the Baltic States, Germany, France and Australia. In 2010, the artist donated 35 of his works to the Vitebsk Art Museum, including abstract compositions, pictorial canvases, and design sketches of decorations for the performances of the Yakub Kolas National Academic Drama Theater. He also provided paintings such as "Crucifixion," "Eve," "Requiem," and "Old Fresco."

Work in Salaueu's studio did not stop until his death.

== Alex Salaueu: Fantasies for the Stage ==
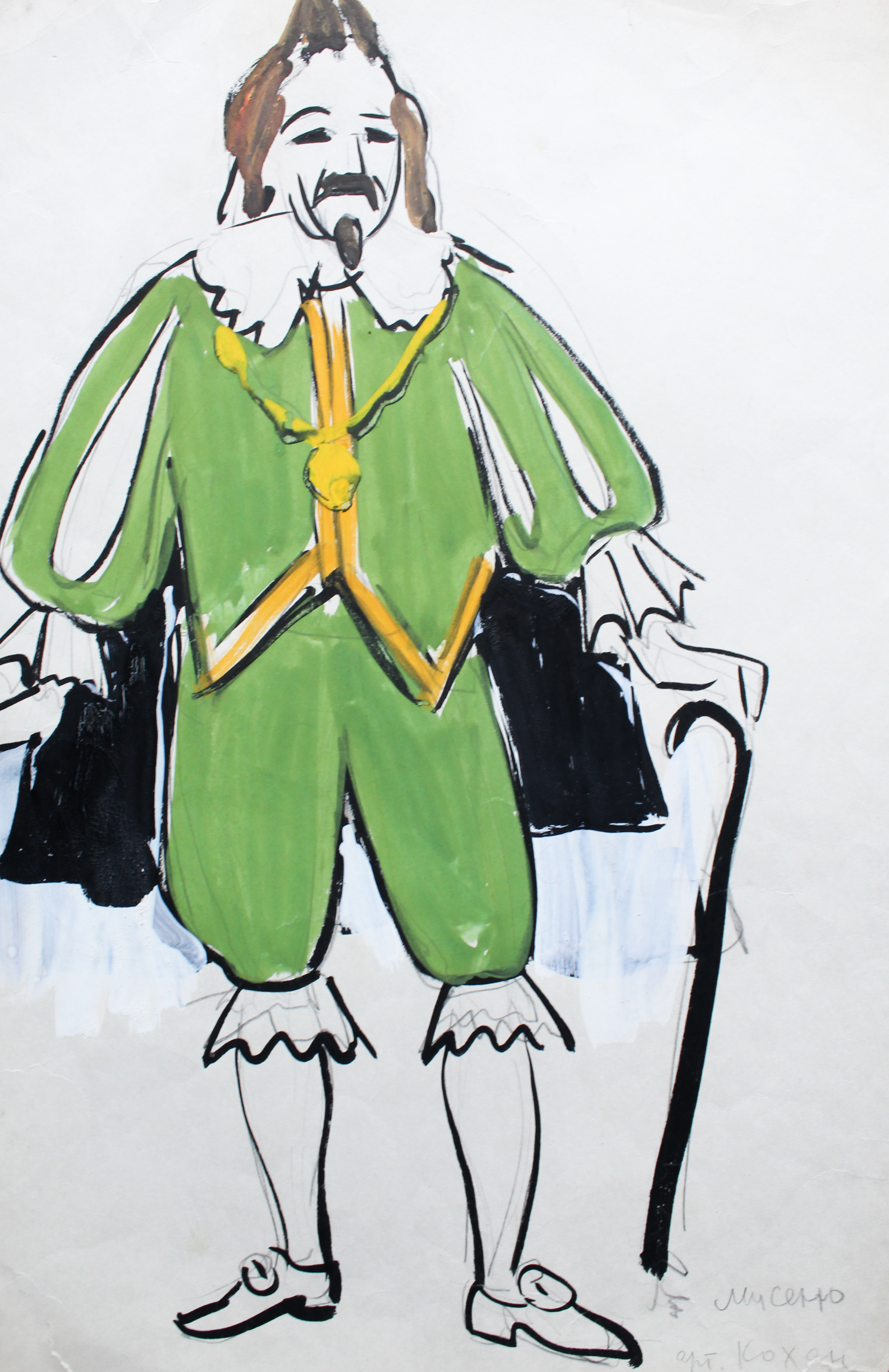
Alex Salaueu: Fantasies for the Stage nr1, watercolor on paper

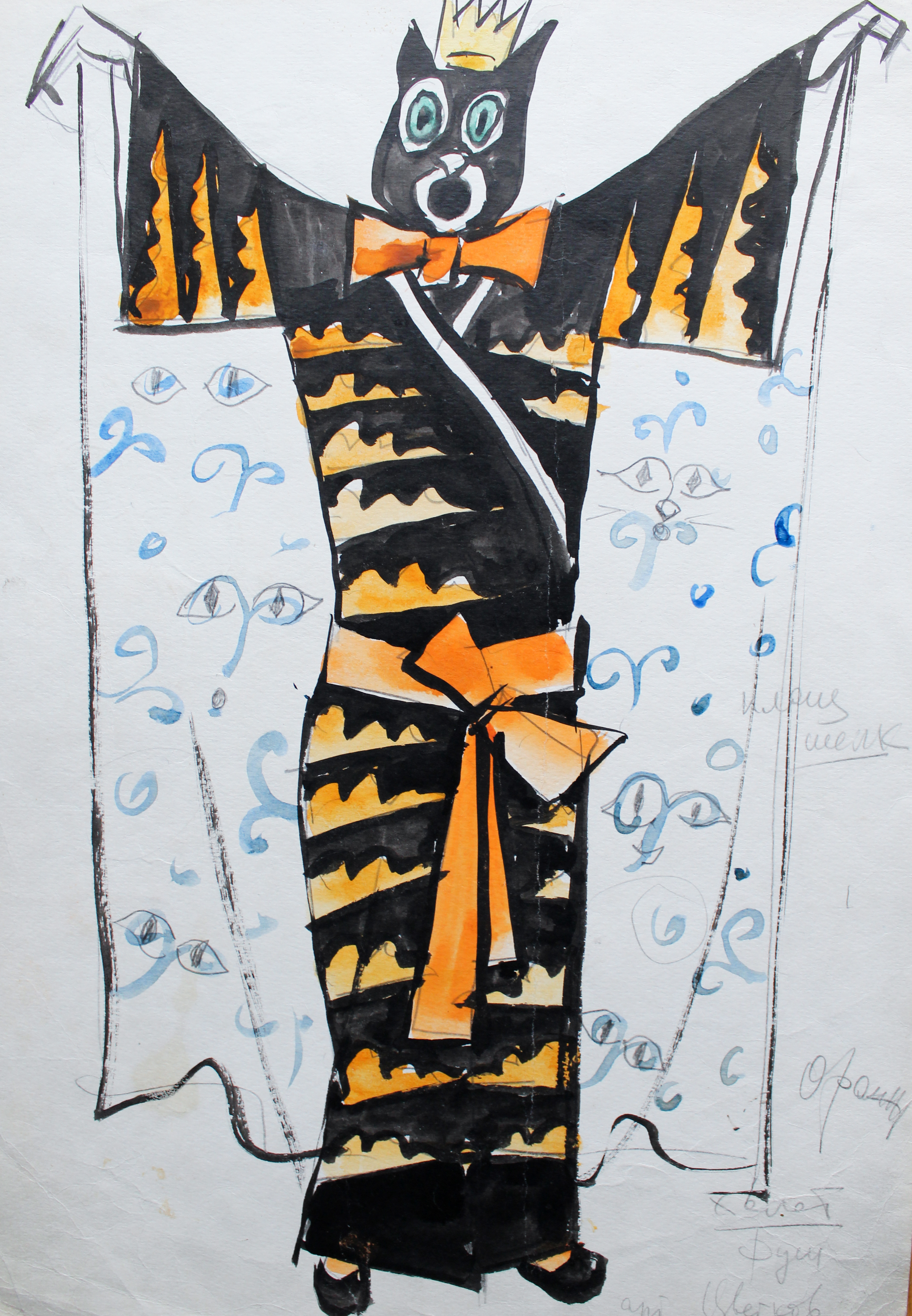
Alex Salaueu: Fantasies for the Stage nr3, watercolor on paper

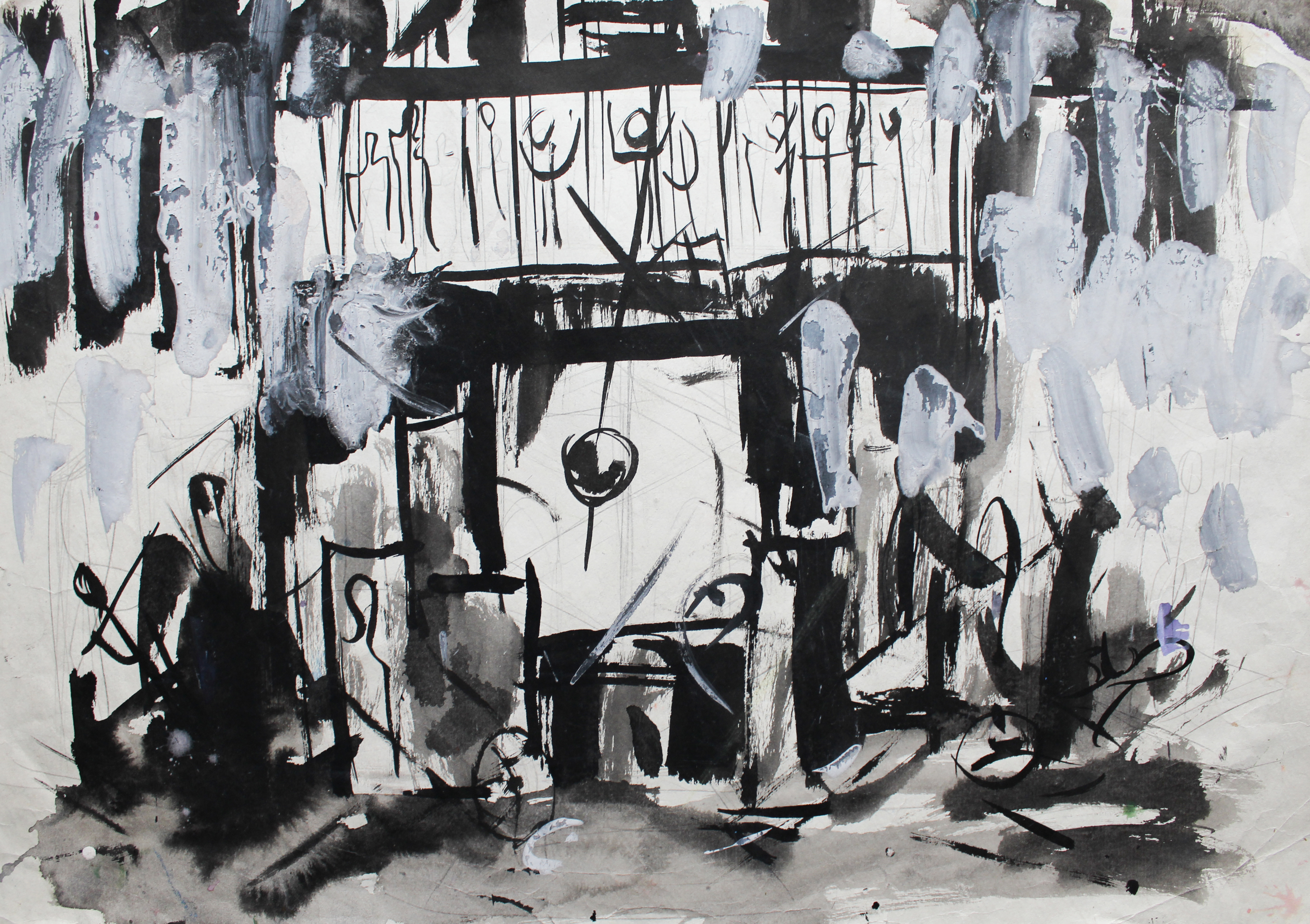
Alex Salaueu "Theater backstage", watercolor on paper

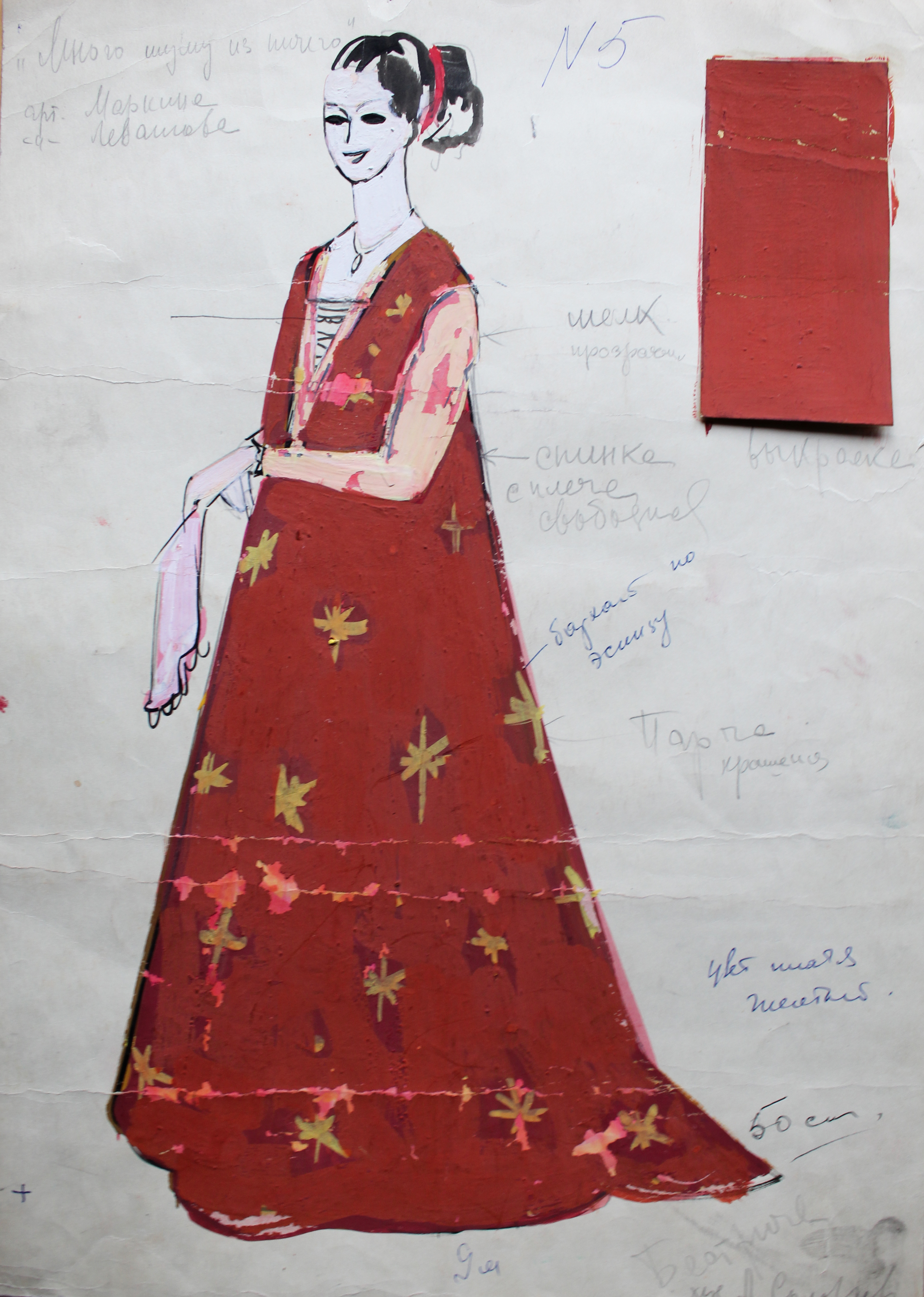
Alex Salaueu: Fantasies for the Stage nr4, watercolor on paper

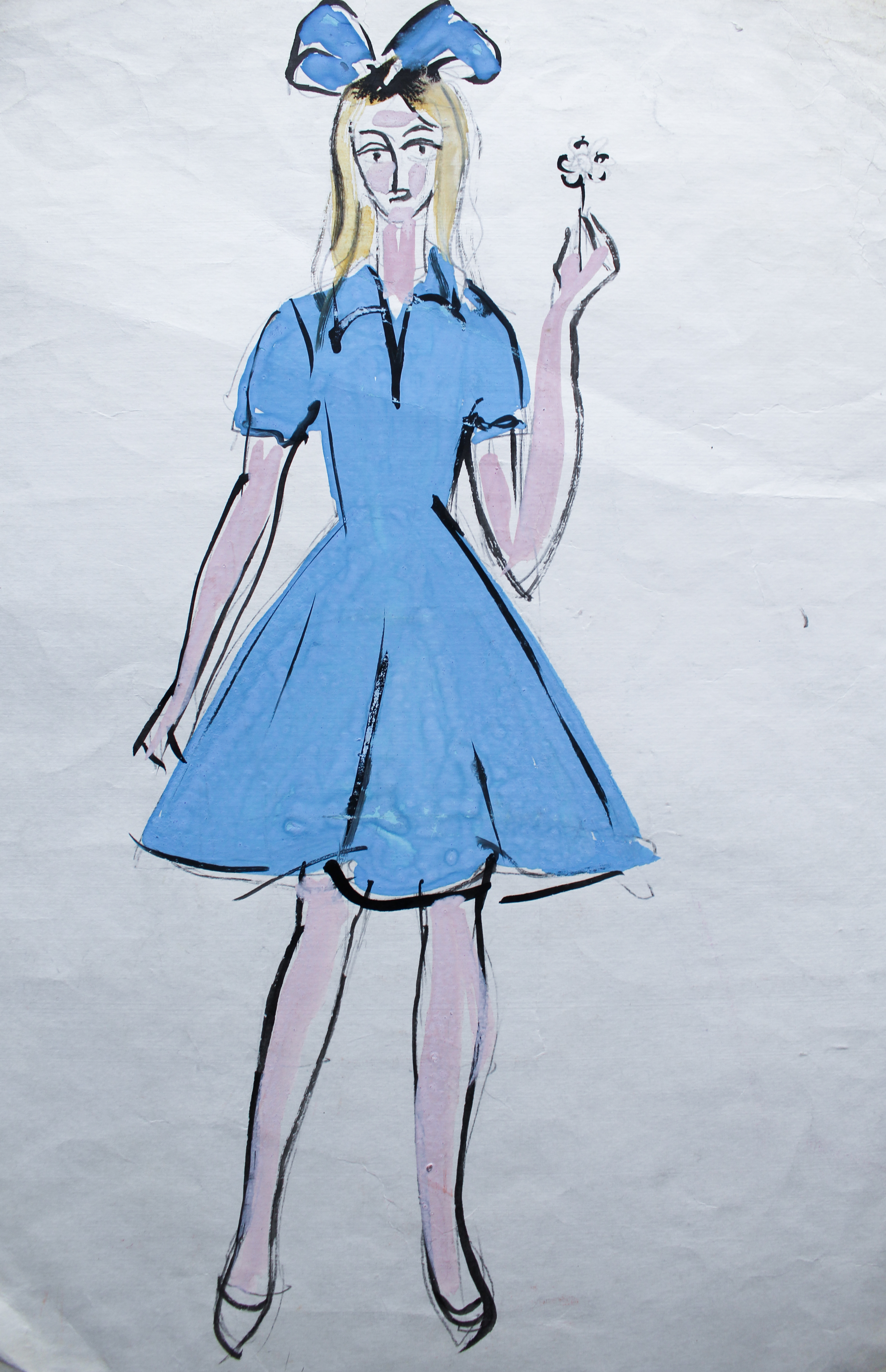
Alex Salaueu: Fantasies for the Stage nr5, watercolor on paper

== Museums ==
- Belarusian National Arts Museum (Minsk, Belarus)
- Marc Chagall Museum (Vitebsk, Belarus)
- Pushkin Museum (Moscow)
- Tretyakov Gallery (Russia)
- New Brunswick Museum (USA)
- Museum of Modern Art (Frankfurt)
- The funds of the Belarusian Union of Artists

== Exhibitions ==
- 1963 – republican exhibition dedicated to the 45th anniversary of the BSSR, Minsk.
- 1967 – republican exhibition of the works of scene-designers, art directors and TV designers, Minsk.
- 1981 – republican art exhibition « The USSR – is Our Homeland » dedicated to the 60th anniversary of the USSR foundation.
- 1987 – republican exhibition of the works of scene-designers, art directors and TV designers, Minsk.
- 2009 – republican art exhibition «ABSTRACT-2009» dedicated to the anniversary of Vitebsk Art School, Minsk.
- 2010 – republican art exhibition «ABSTRACT-2009» dedicated to the anniversary of Vitebsk Art School, Minsk.
- 1967 – regional art exhibition «Vitebsk the Heroic and the Labour», Vitebsk regional museum;
- 1967 – regional art exhibition dedicated to the 50th anniversary of October Revolution, Vitebsk.
- 1968 – regional art exhibition «Vitebsk the Heroic and the Labour», Vitebsk;
- 1968 – anniversary regional art exhibition dedicated to the 50th anniversary of the BSSR and KPB, Vitebsk.
- 1974 – regional art exhibition dedicated to the 30th anniversary of liberation of Belarus and Vitebsk from fascist aggressors, Vitebsk.
- 1987 – regional art exhibition dedicated to the 70th anniversary of October Revolution, Vitebsk.
- 1974 – retrospective exhibition of the works by belorussian artists of 1944–1974, Minsk.
- 1976 – anniversary personal exhibition, Vitebsk.
- 1980 – exhibition of the artists А. Salaueu, L. Antimonov, А. Orlov, Vitebsk.
- 1982 – exhibition of the artists from Vitebsk region, Smolensk.
- 1986 – exhibition of the artists А. Salaueu, L. Antimonov, Polotsk;
- 1986 – personal art exhibition, Vitebsk regional museum.
- 1989 – exhibition of Vitebsk artists dedicated to the 70th anniversary of the BSSR and KPB, Vitebsk;
- 1989 – exhibition of scene-designers following the results of the theatre season of 1987–1988, Minsk.
- 1993 – exhibition of the artists А. Salaueu and P. Kirilin, Vitebsk.
- 1997 – exhibition of the artists А. Salaueu and V. Chukin, Vitebsk.
- 2000 – personal art exhibition, Vitebsk.
- 2000 – personal animalistic exhibition, Vitebsk (Art Museum).
- 2001 – anniversary personal exhibition (Yakub Kolas National Academic Drama Theatre), Vitebsk;
- 2001 – anniversary personal exhibition Vitebsk regional museum;
- 2001 – anniversary personal exhibition (exhibition hall of the UA), Vitebsk;
- 2001 – personal art exhibition, Polotsk.
- 2004 – art exhibition «There was a War» dedicated to the 60th anniversary of liberation of Belarus and Vitebsk from fascist aggressors, Vitebsk.
- 2005 – personal art exhibition Vitebsk Museum of Modern Art;
- 2005 – personal art exhibition (Regional Library name after V. Lenin), Vitebsk.
- 2006 – anniversary personal exhibition, Vitebsk Museum of Modern Art.
- 2009 – personal art exhibition, Vitebsk Museum of Modern Art
- 2010 – personal art exhibition «One-man Theater», Vitebsk.
- 2011 – personal art exhibition к 85th anniversary of A. Salaueu's birth (Yakub Kolas National Academic Drama Theatre, Regional Museum of Local History), Vitebsk;
- 2011 – personal art exhibition « Revelation», Vitebsk;
- 2011 – art exhibition «What does Motherland Start with», Vitebsk;
- 2011 – exhibition dedicated to the 40th anniversary Vitebsk organization of artists, Minsk.
- 2012 – personal art exhibition «Element of Colour» (Regional Library name after V. Lenin), Vitebsk;
- 2012– exhibition of works «Fine Gift, Invaluable Gift», granted to Vitebsk Museum of Modern Art, Vitebsk.
- 2013 – personal art exhibition «Theatre of Alexander Salaueu» (Yakub Kolas National Academic Drama Theatre, Regional Museum of Local History), Vitebsk.
- 2015 – personal art exhibition «Our Eternal Nature: colour, rhythm, space» (Art Museum), Vitebsk.
- 2016 – personal anniversary art exhibition «The Movement of My Dream», dedicated to the 90th anniversary of the artist (exhibition hall of CE «Museum "Vitebsk Centre of Modern Art"»), Vitebsk;
- 2016 – personal anniversary art exhibition «Reality With No Similarity» to the 90th anniversary of Honoured Art Worker of Belarus Alexander Salaueu Belarusian National Arts Museum, Minsk.
- 2017 – exhibition of the thematic works by Vitebsk artists – veterans of the Great Patriotic War «War In the Works of Its Soldiers» Vitebsk Museum of Modern Art, May, 8 – June, 4), Vitebsk.

== Honours, decorations, awards and distinctions ==
- Order of the Patriotic War
- Order of Francysk Skaryna

== Oeuvres ==
Oeuvres of Alex Salaueu
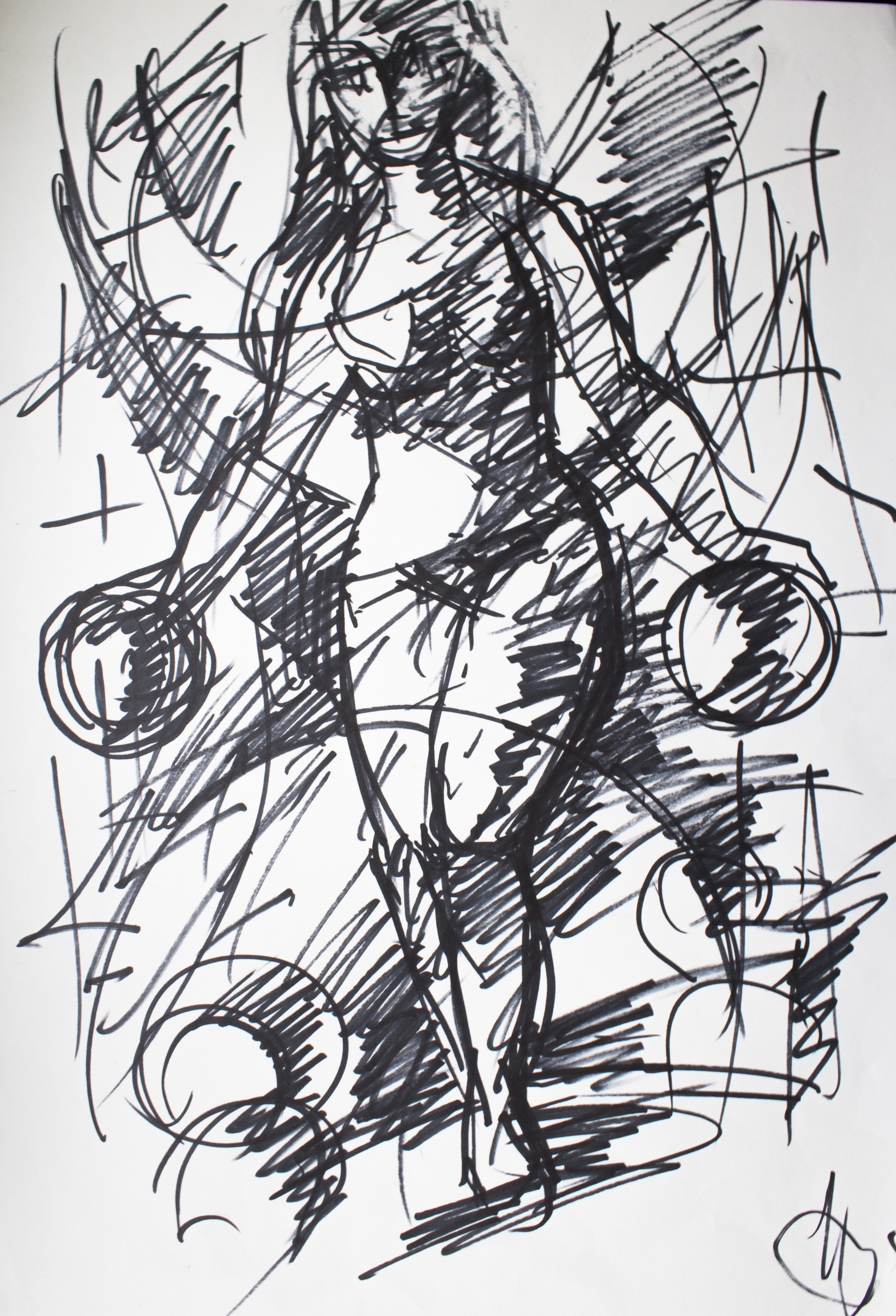
Alex Salaueu, drawing on paper 60 cm x 42cm

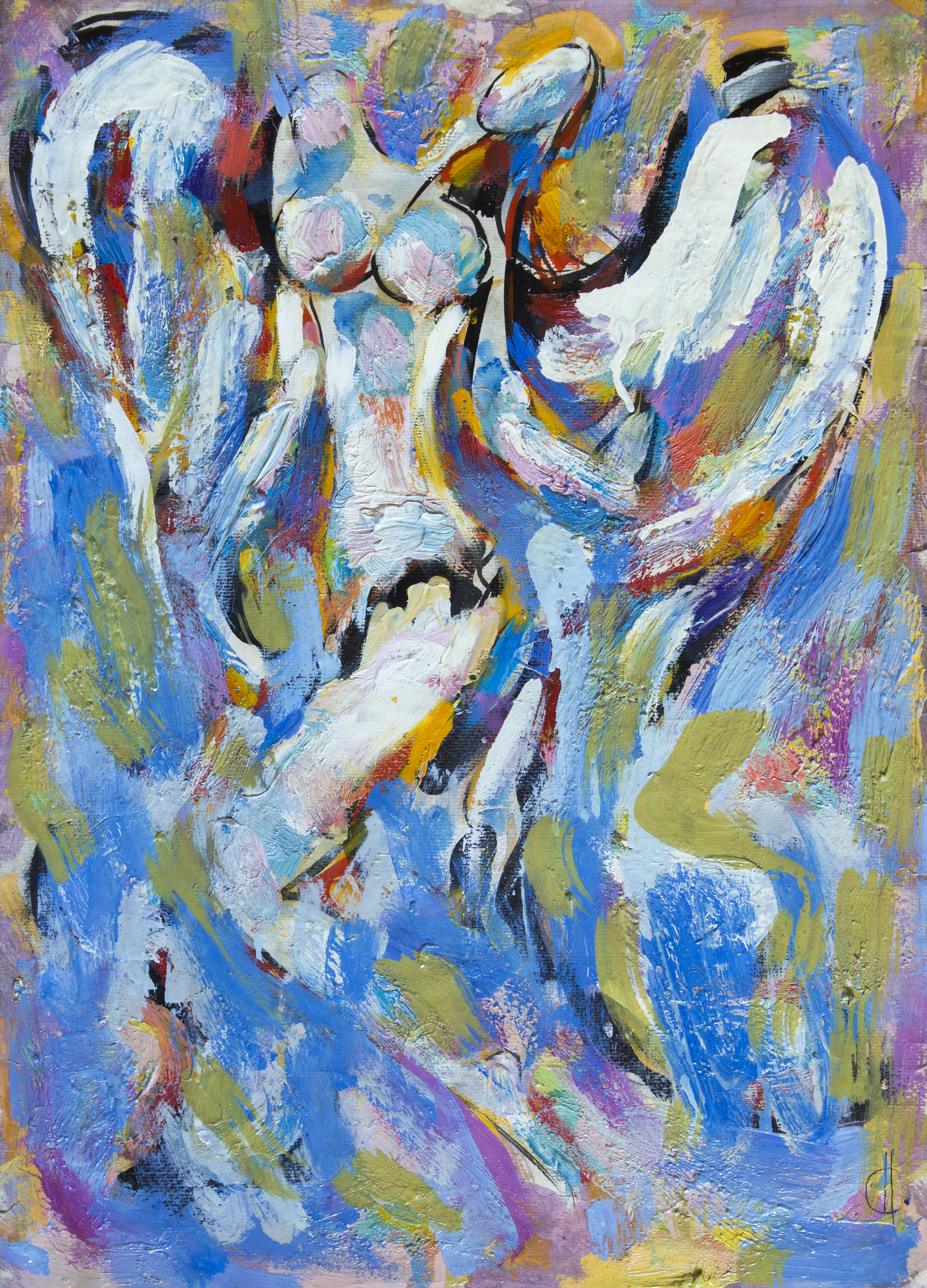
Alex Salaueu "Muse" 1973, 50 cm x 40 cm, oil on canvas

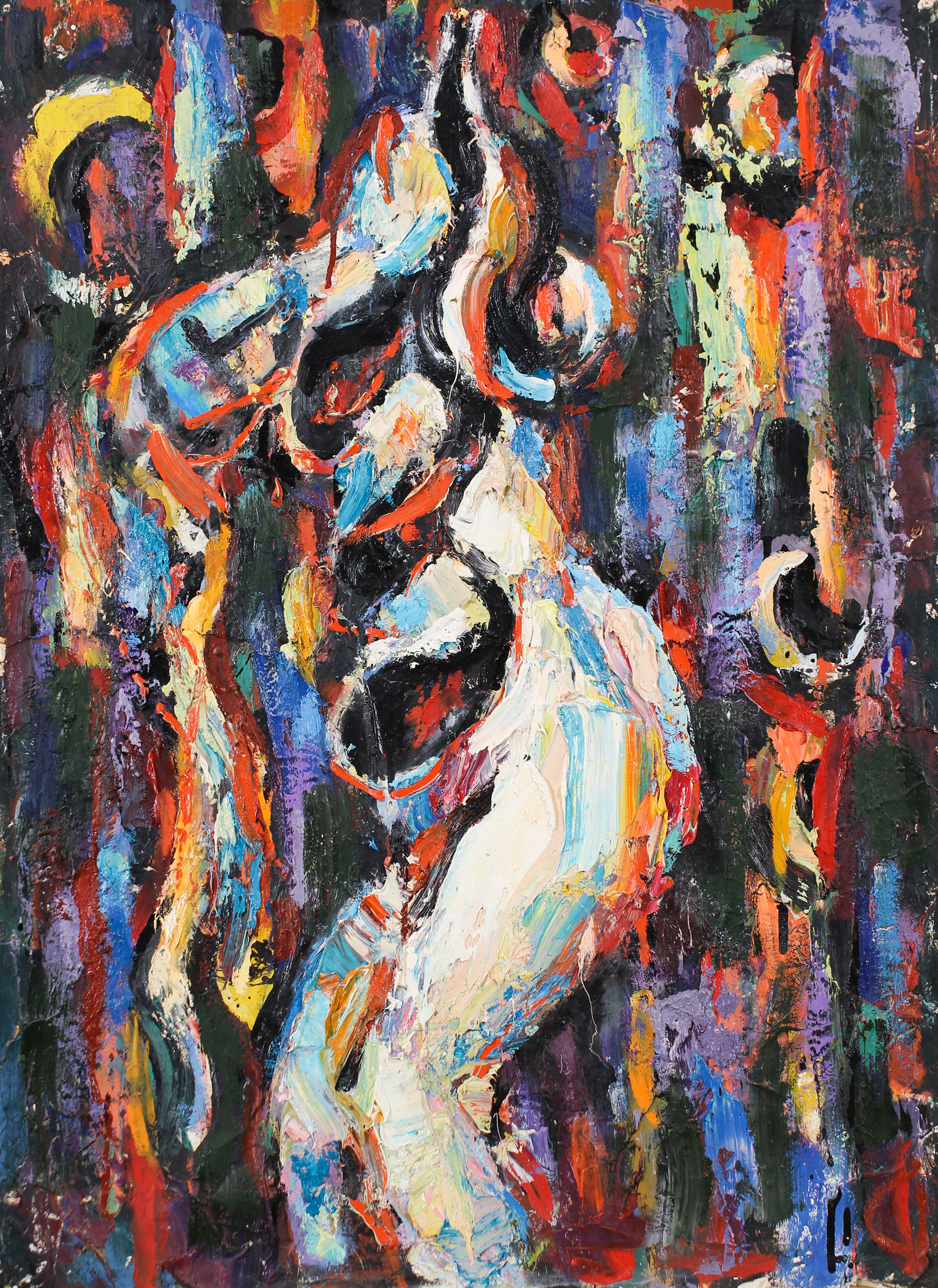
Alex Salaueu "Shape of you" 2018, 65cm x 40cm, oil on board

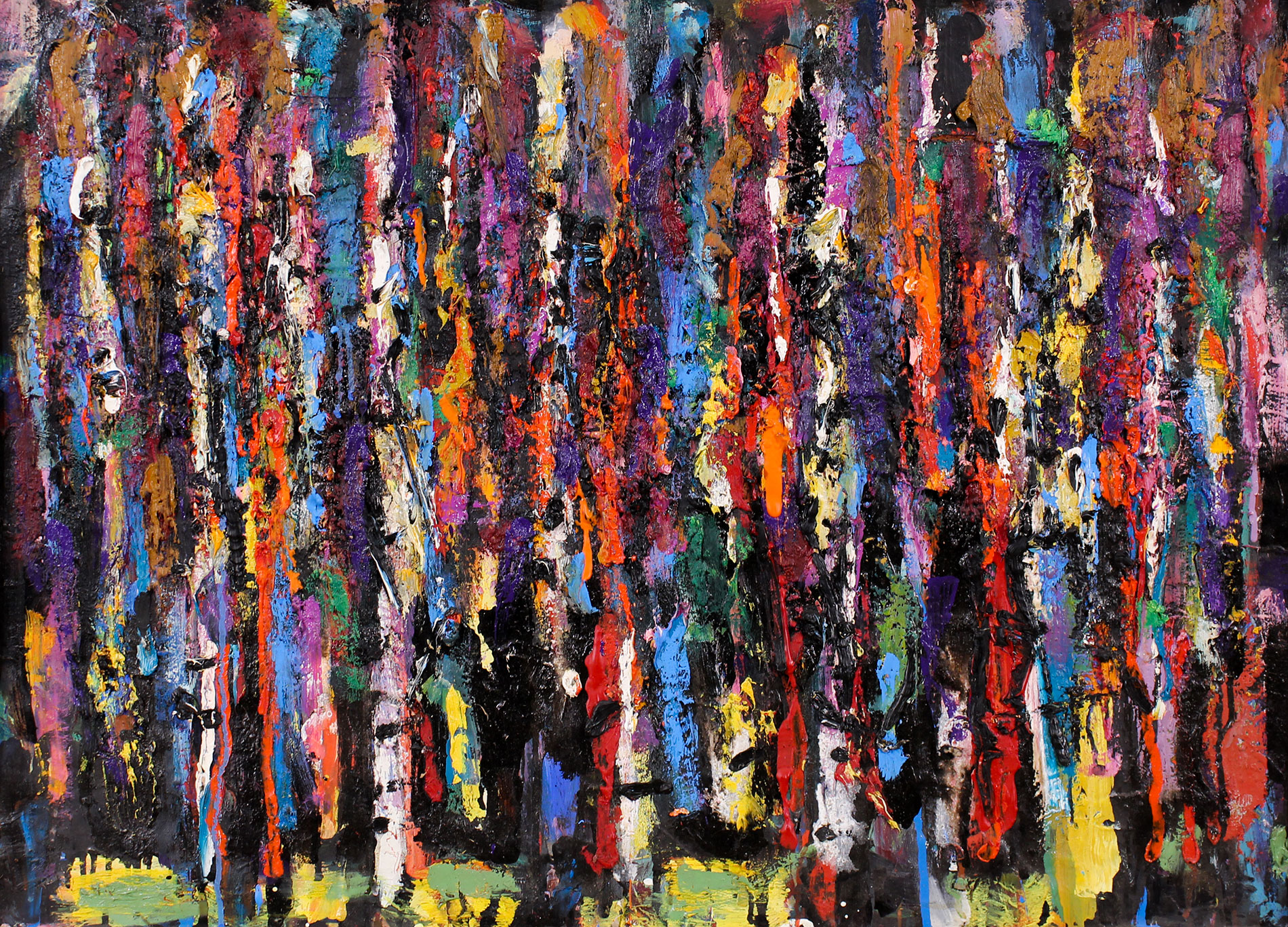
Alex Salaueu "Forest" 2018, oil on cardboard, 70 cm x 85 cm
Alex Salaueu

== Bibliography ==
- Aliaksandr Salauyou // A Union of Creators [Visual Material] = A Union of Creators : photo album / compiled and text by M. Tsybulski; introduction by U. Andreychanka; photographs by V. Balotsin, M. Tsybulski. — Minsk : Belarus, 2005. — P. 115. — In Belarusian and English.
- Ivanouski, Yu. I. Salauyou Aliaksandr Aliaksandravich / Yu. I. Ivanouski // Belarusian Encyclopedia : in 18 vols. / editorial board: H. P. Pashkou (editor-in-chief) [et al.]. — Minsk : BelEN, 2002. — Vol. 14. — P. 103.
- Salauyou Aliaksandr Aliaksandravich // Belarusian Union of Artists : 1938—1998 : encyclopedic reference book / author-compiler B. A. Krepak [et al.]. — Minsk : VTAA "Kavaler Publishers", 1998. — P. 482. — In Belarusian and English.
- Salauyou Aliaksandr Aliaksandravich // Contemporary Artists of the Vitebsk Region : bio-bibliographic dictionary / State Institution "Vitebsk Regional Library named after V. I. Lenin", Department of Literature on Art; compiled by... V. I. Aliyeva. — Vitebsk, 1994. — pp. 94–97.
- Solovyov, Alexander Alexandrovich // Encyclopedia of Literature and Art of Belarus: in 5 vols. / editorial board: I. P. Shamyakin (editor-in-chief) [et al.]. — Minsk: Belarusian Soviet Encyclopedia, 1987. — Vol. 4. — p. 615.
- Tsybulsky, M. L. Solovyov, Alexander Alexandrovich / M. L. Tsybulsky // Regions of Belarus: Encyclopedia: in 7 vols. / editorial board: T. V. Belova (editor-in-chief) [et al.]. — Minsk: P. Brouka Belarusian Encyclopedia, 2011. — Vol. 2: Vitebsk Region. Book 2. — p. 481.
- Ablazhey, A. The Bitter Air of Vitebsk / A. Ablazhey // Mastatstva Belarusi (Art of Belarus). — 1991. — No. 1. — pp. 36–45.
- Antimonov, L. "Versions" of One's Own Model / L. Antimonov // Kultura (Culture). — 2011. — May 7–13. — p. 9.
- Antimonov, L. Between Two Currents / L. Antimonov // Litaratura i Mastatstva (Literature and Art). — 2011. — Oct. 7. — P. 23.
- Antimonau, L. "Work Begins with Doubts" / L. Antimonau // *Mastatstva Belarusi* [Art of Belarus]. — 1986. — No. 11. — Pp. 14–16.
- Bazan, L. A Polyphony of Colors and Feelings / L. Bazan // *Vitsebski Rabochy* [Vitebsk Worker]. — 1986. — Dec. 18.
- Valodzka, H. The Most Unique and Mysterious... / H. Valodzka // *Vitsebski Rabochy* [Vitebsk Worker]. — 1992. — Mar. 10.
- Vasilyev, V. Reflections on an Artist / V. Vasilyev // *Vitebsky Kurier* [Vitebsk Courier]. — 1998. — Apr. 3. — P. 3.
- Grishina, A. In a Whirlwind of Feelings and Color / A. Grishina // *Vitsebski Rabochy* [Vitebsk Worker]. — 2012. — May 8. — P. 8.
- Dyagilev, L. Good Must Always Prevail / L. Dyagilev // *Sovetskaya Kultura* [Soviet Culture]. — 1985. — Jan. 5. — P. 5.
- Zmitrovich, L. Exhibition of Vitebsk Artists / L. Zmitrovich // *Vitsebski Rabochy* [Vitebsk Worker]. — 1980. — Feb. 2.
- Krupitsa, N. It Was My Lot to Live! / N. Krupitsa // *Vitbichi*. — 2012. — May 19. — P. 10.
- Ladzisau, A. Do Not Repeat Long-Known Truths / A. Ladzisau // Stsyah Kamunizmu (Polatsk). — 1986. — Aug. 1.
- Likhachou, U. Or Simply: Drop In and Take a Look / U. Likhachou // Stsyah Kamunizmu (Polatsk). — 1986. — Aug. 16. — P. 2.
- Mazynski, V. Three Under One Roof / V. Mazynski // Vitsebski Rabochy. — 1980. — Feb. 27.
- Naumchyk, S. A Bold Talent: Artist A. Salauyou Turns 60 / S. Naumchyk // Vitsebski Rabochy. — 1986. — Sept. 12.
- Pasternak, T. A Duet at the Vernissage / T. Pasternak // Narodnaye Slova. — 1993. — Jan. 18. — P. 2.
- Pasternak, T. "Revelation" by Alexander Solovyov / T. Pasternak // Narodnaye Slova. — 2011. — Sept. 17. — P. 6.
- Pasternak, T. Portrait of a Best Friend / T. Pasternak // Narodnaye Slova. — 2001. — Mar. 1. — P. 8.
- Pasternak, T. "Requiem" for the 20th Century / T. Pasternak // Narodnaye Slova. — 2009. — May 12. — P. 7.
- Pasternak, T. The artist has wings / T. Pasternak // People's word. — 1997. — July 2.
- Ruban, V.' Artist who gives joy / V. Ruban // Vitebsk worker. — 1972. — July 4.
- Ruban, V. The point is put by the artist / V. Ruban // Banner of youth. — 1972. — January 7.
- Saloveiov, A.' And the light of the ramp will flash / A. Soloviev // Vitebsk worker. — 1983. — February 5.
- Solov'ev, A. "The main thing in art is instinct and intuition" / A. Solov'ev // Narodne slova. — 2006. — October 21. — P. 8.
- Solov'ev, A. "Painting is the wanderings of the soul..." / A. Soloviev; T. Soloviev spoke // Vitebsk prospect. — 2009. — May 14. — P. 3.
- Solov'ev, A. Revelations of Saint Sanich / A. Soloviev; spoke to N. Krupitsa // Vitbichi=Vitbichi. — 2012. — January 19. — S. IV.
- Solov'ev, A. "This is my confession, my path..." / A. Soloviev; spoke to N. Krupitsa // Vitbichi=Vitbichi. — 2009. — May 12. — P. 7.
- Solov'ev, A. "I want to see myself ... " / A. Soloviev; L. Tymoshik gave a talk // Banner of Youth. — 1992. — Apr. 23.
- Solov'eva, T.'"You can't lie in art" / T. Solovyova // Vitebsk prospect. — 2011. — September 15. - P. 5.
- Solov'eva, T.' Priceless gift / T. Solovyova // Vitebsk prospect. — 2010. — June 10. — P. 4.
- 'Sys, E." "Theatre of one artist" / E. Sys // Vitebsk worker. — 2010. — May 15. — P. 4.
- Khabatiev, G.' In the world of theater and cinema / G. Khabatiev // Vitebsk worker. — 1987. — November 18.
