= Mikalai Mikhalap =

Mikałaj Miсhałap
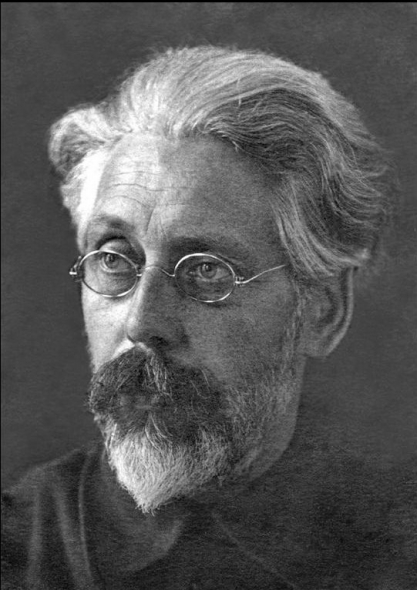
- Born: April 28, 1886; Minsk, Russian Empire
- Died: 1979; Minsk, Soviet Union
- Style: Ceramic, small architectural forms

Mikałaj Prakopavič Michałap was a Soviet ceramic artist and director of the State Art Gallery of Belarus from 1939 to 1941.

== Early life ==
Mikałaj Miсhałap came from the family of a railwayman father and housemaid mother. He graduated from Baron Stieglitz Central school for Technical Draftsmanship (current Saint Petersburg Art and Industry Academy). Michałap was the first Belarusian ceramic artist.

== Career ==
Mikałaj was teaching in Vitebsk Art School and running a department of pottery and ceramic there from 1925 to 1930. He was close with Belarusian classic Janka Kupała; he painted his portrait and created first decoration for one of Kupała's plays.
