= Crucifix from the Mstsislau Church Museum =

17th-century wooden sculpture in the National Art Museum of Belarus

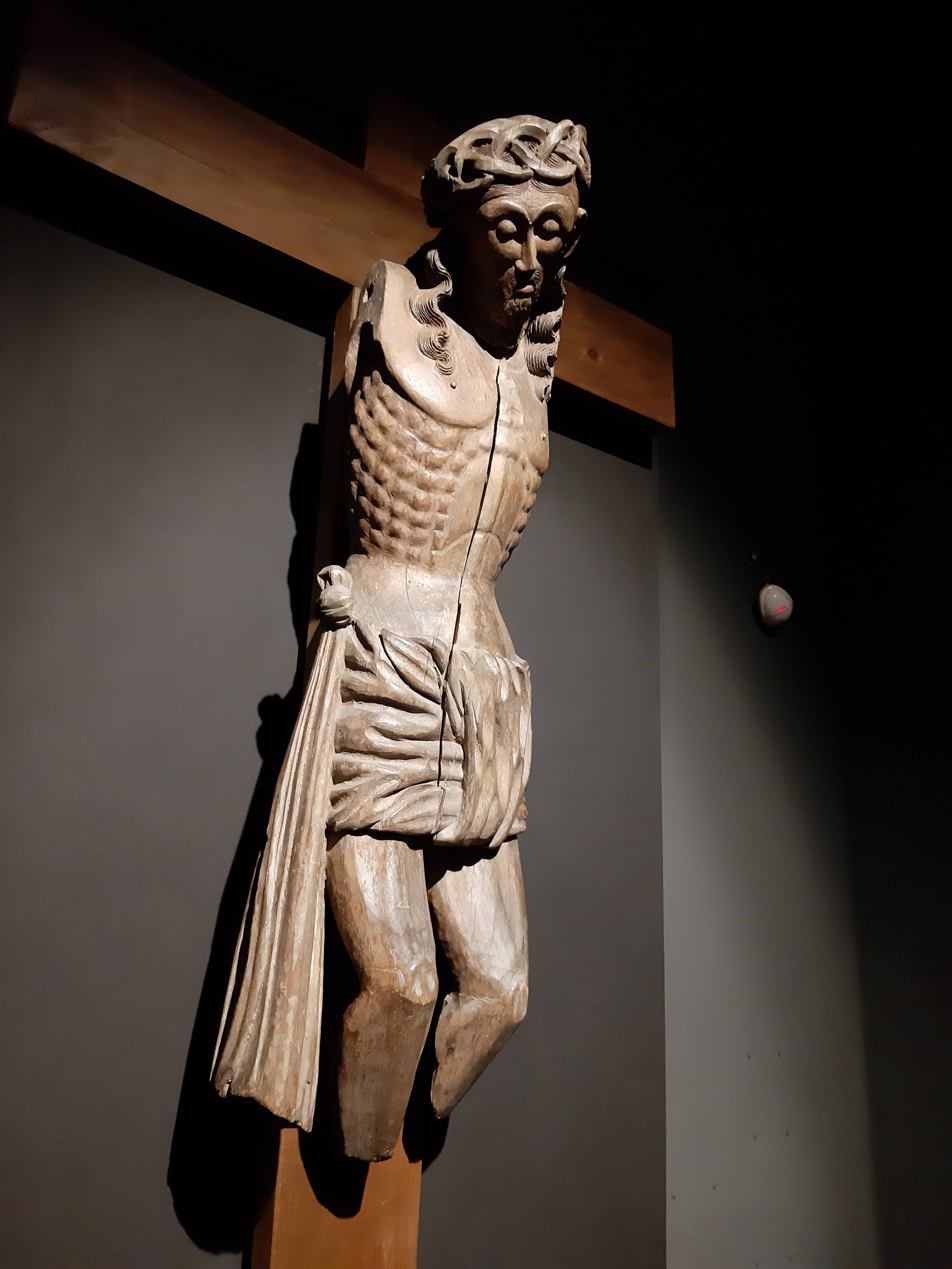
- The crucifix (fragment)
- Artist: Unknown
- Year: First half of the 17th century
- Type: Sculpture, Crucifix
- Medium: Wood, egg tempera
- Subject: Crucifixion of Jesus
- Dimensions: 103.5 cm × 27 cm (40.7 in × 10.6 in)
- Location: National Art Museum of the Republic of Belarus; Minsk, Belarus
- Accession: КП-1941, ДБС-52

The Crucifix from the Mstsislau Church Museum (Belarusian: Укрыжаванне з Мсціслаўскага царкоўнага музея) is a fragmentarily preserved wooden crucifix, likely created in the first half of the 17th century by an unknown artist. It is now in the National Art Museum of the Republic of Belarus in Minsk.

For a long time, the crucifix was known as the "Crucifix from Halubichy" (Belarusian: Распяцце з Галубічаў), was erroneously dated to the 14th century, and was considered the earliest surviving monument of such sculpture on the territory of Belarus.

It was restored in 1954 by A. P. Yahorau.

== Dating and provenance ==
In the 1960s, N. N. Pomerantsev attributed the work to the earliest monuments based on stylistic features, dating it to the 14th century and noting its closeness to Romanesque wooden sculpture. This opinion was supported by other researchers. For instance, art historian Ala Lyavonava wrote that it was the earliest surviving monument in Belarus and that it was marked by features of the Romanesque style. She identified the defining features of the work as the severity of the image, monumentality, and conciseness of expressive means.

In the works of art historian Nadzeya Vysotskaya, it was noted that the Crucifix was discovered in 1921 and originated from the village of Halubichy in the Hlybokaye District of the Vitebsk Region.

Based on this information, Aliaksandr Jarashevich later proposed a new dating for the monument. In his opinion, there is no convincing evidence for the appearance of monumental sculpture in Orthodox churches of the Grand Duchy of Lithuania in the 14th century, and the Church of St. George in Halubichy is mentioned only in the mid-16th century. Jarashevich also noted features of the Crucifix that could indicate its origin from a Catholic church, but interpreted them as Catholic influences. He concluded that the Crucifix most likely appeared in the Halubichy church in the second quarter of the 17th century (1625–1635), when the village became connected with the Basilian Monastery of the Holy Trinity in Vilnius.

The polychrome wooden crucifix was described as an example of the skill of a local master carver, whose work was influenced by the features of the severe style of European defensive architecture and certain trends of Italian art.

=== New findings ===
In 2021, researcher Stanislaŭ Čavus proved that the origin of the Crucifix from the village of Halubichy was erroneously determined based on the inventory book of the Vilnius Belarusian Museum named after Ivan Luckievič. Nadzeya Vysotskaya referred to item No. 215 of this document. However, the crucifix "from Halubichy" is recorded in the inventory book under No. 214 and has a much smaller size — only 40.5 cm (15.9 in) in height. Item No. 215 is indeed described as a "figure of the crucified Christ made of wood, without one arm (left) and without a cross. Painted. Height of the figure 103 cm (41 in)". It is likely that the coincidence of size (103 cm) allowed the researcher to link this inventory record with the existing museum object. The actual Crucifix from Halubichy, which was listed under No. 214, is also kept in the collection of the National Art Museum of Belarus (inventory number KP14662, DBS-194) and dates to the 18th–19th centuries.

The crucifix in question (No. 215) bears the museum number of another pre-war collection — the Belarusian State Museum, to which it was transferred from the Mstsislau Church Museum.

== Gallery ==
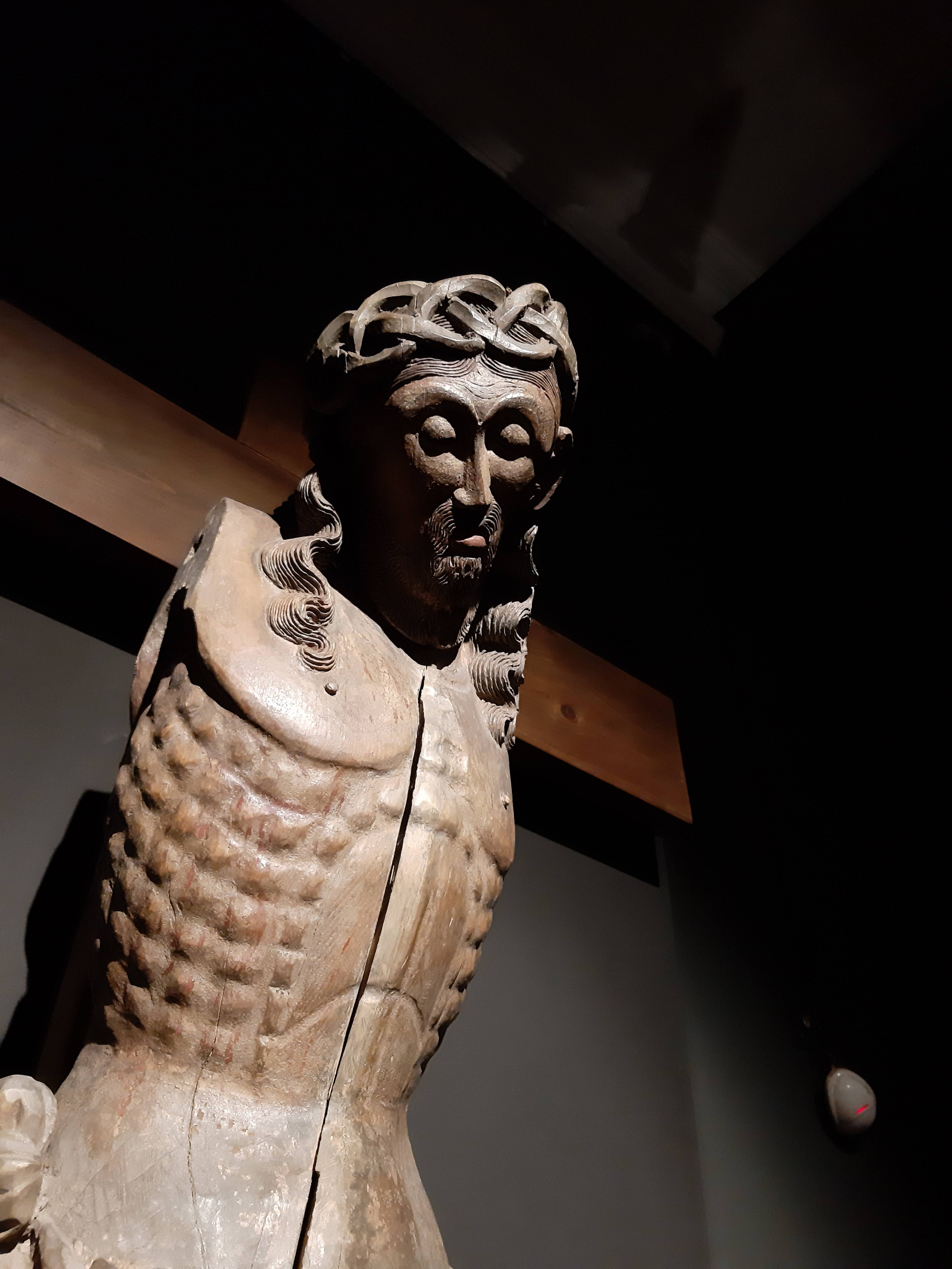
Detail of the torso

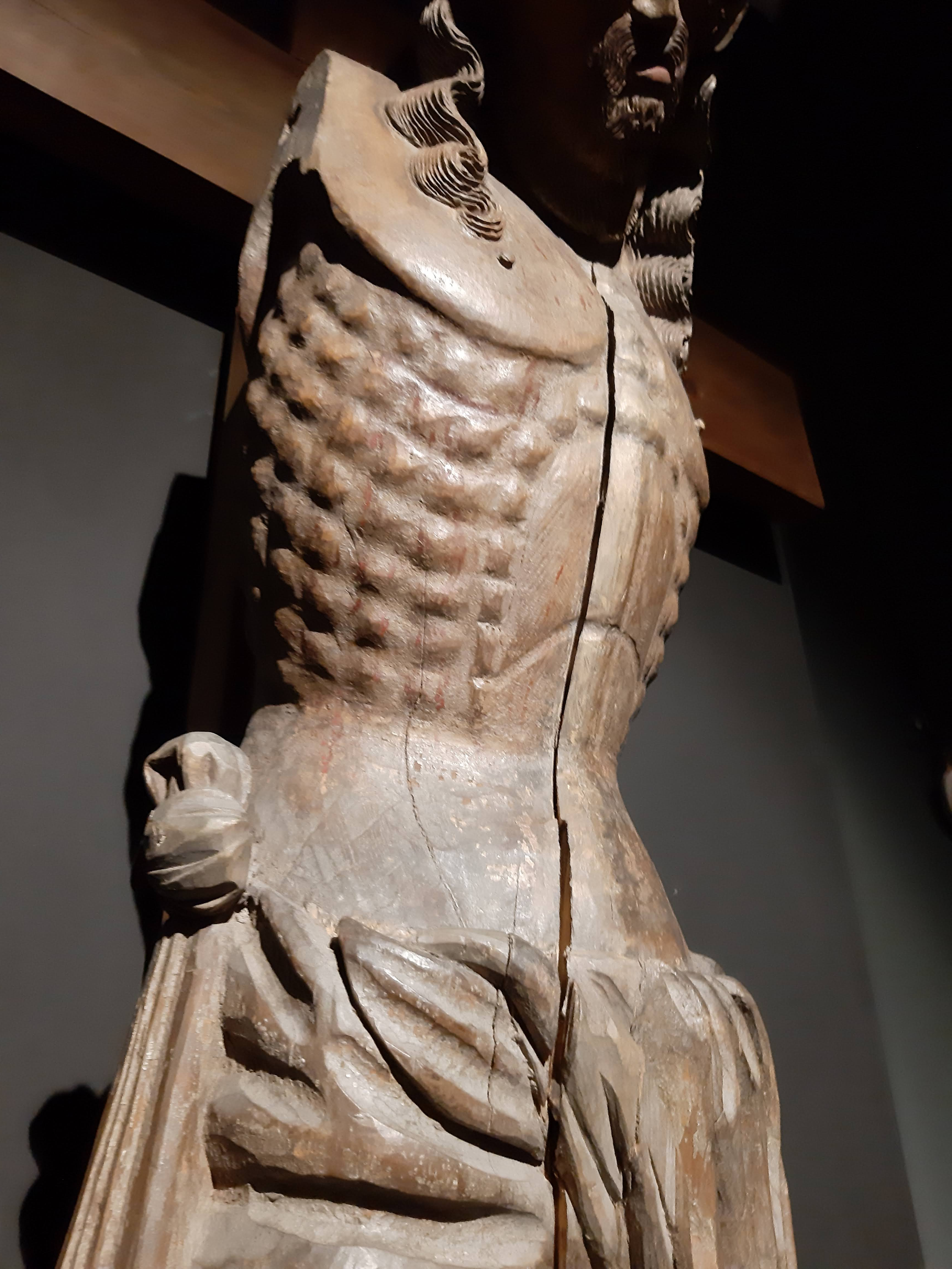
Side view

== Literature ==
- Лявонава, А. К. (1991). Старажытнабеларуская скульптура [Ancient Belarusian Sculpture] (in Belarusian). Мінск: Навука і тэхніка. ISBN 5-343-00155-6.
- Высоцкая, Н. Ф. (1983). Пластыка Беларусі XII—XVIII стст. [Plastic Art of Belarus of the 12th–18th Centuries] (in Belarusian). Мінск: Беларусь.
