= The National Art Museum of the Republic of Belarus =

Art Museum in Minsk, Belarus

Coordinates: 53°53′54″N 27°33′38″E

National Art Museum of the Republic of Belarus
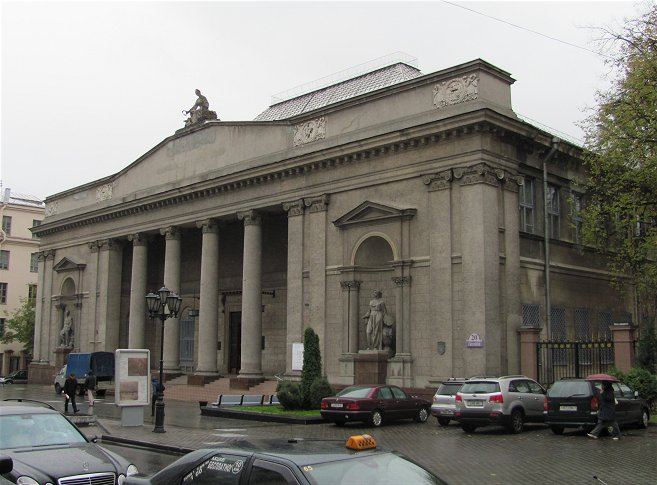
- Established: 1939
- Location: Minsk, Belarus
- Director: Vladimir Prokoptsov
- Website: artmuseum.by

The National Art Museum of the Republic of Belarus (Belarusian: Нацыянальны мастацкі музей Рэспублікі Беларусь, romanized: Nacyjanaĺny mastacki muziej Respubliki Bielaruś ) is the largest art museum in Belarus and is located in its capital, Minsk. The museum comprises more than thirty thousands works of art which make up twenty various collections and constitutes two main ones: the one of national art and the other of art monuments of various countries of the world. It was formerly known as the State Art Gallery.

== History ==
An important precursor of the museum was the Vitebsk Museum of Modern Art which existed from 1919 to 1925, in the early years of the Soviet era. The Vitebsk art scene was vibrant due to the presence of important artists including Malevich, Chagall and Lissitzky. The remaining paintings in this museum were transferred to the Vitebsk Regional Museum in 1925. In 1939, most of these would be relocated to the newly founded State Art Gallery in Minsk.

The gallery was created on January 24, 1939 under the Resolution of the Council of People's Commissars of Belarus. The gallery took 15 halls of Graduate Agricultural School, former Minsk Girls Gymnasium. Besides divisions of painting, sculpture, and graphics, a separate division of art industry was created by a special order. At this time, the gallery was led by prominent Belarusian painter-ceramist Mikalai Mikhalap.

At the beginning of 1941, the State Art Gallery's funds and stocks had numbered nearly 2,711 artworks out of which four hundred were on display. Virtually the entire collection disappeared during the Great Patriotic War.

After the War, a small part of the works of art was returned, mainly those which had been at the exhibitions in Russia before the War. In spite of the postwar devastation, when Minsk lay in ruins, the Government of Belarus allocated sums of money for purchasing works of art for the Gallery. In August 1945, the canvases by Boris Kustodiev, Vasily Polenov, Karl Briullov and Isaak Levitan were obtained.

In 1993, the museum was renamed the National Art Museum of the Republic of Belarus.

== Former directors ==
- Mikalai Mikhalap (1939–1941)
- Alena Aladava (1944–1977)
- Yury Karachun (1977–1997)
- Uladzimir Prakaptsou (1998–2023)
- Ganna Konanava (2023–current)

== Gallery ==
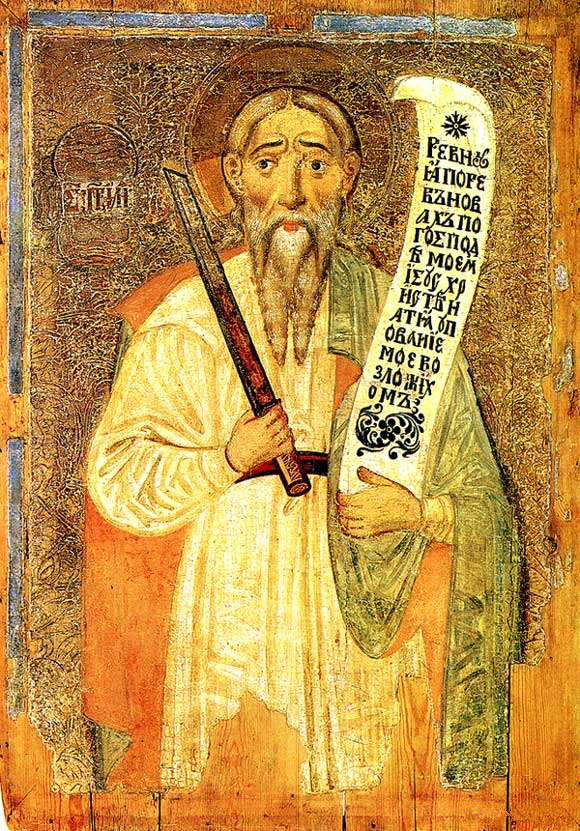
The Prophet Elijah. 1668. Tempera on panel.

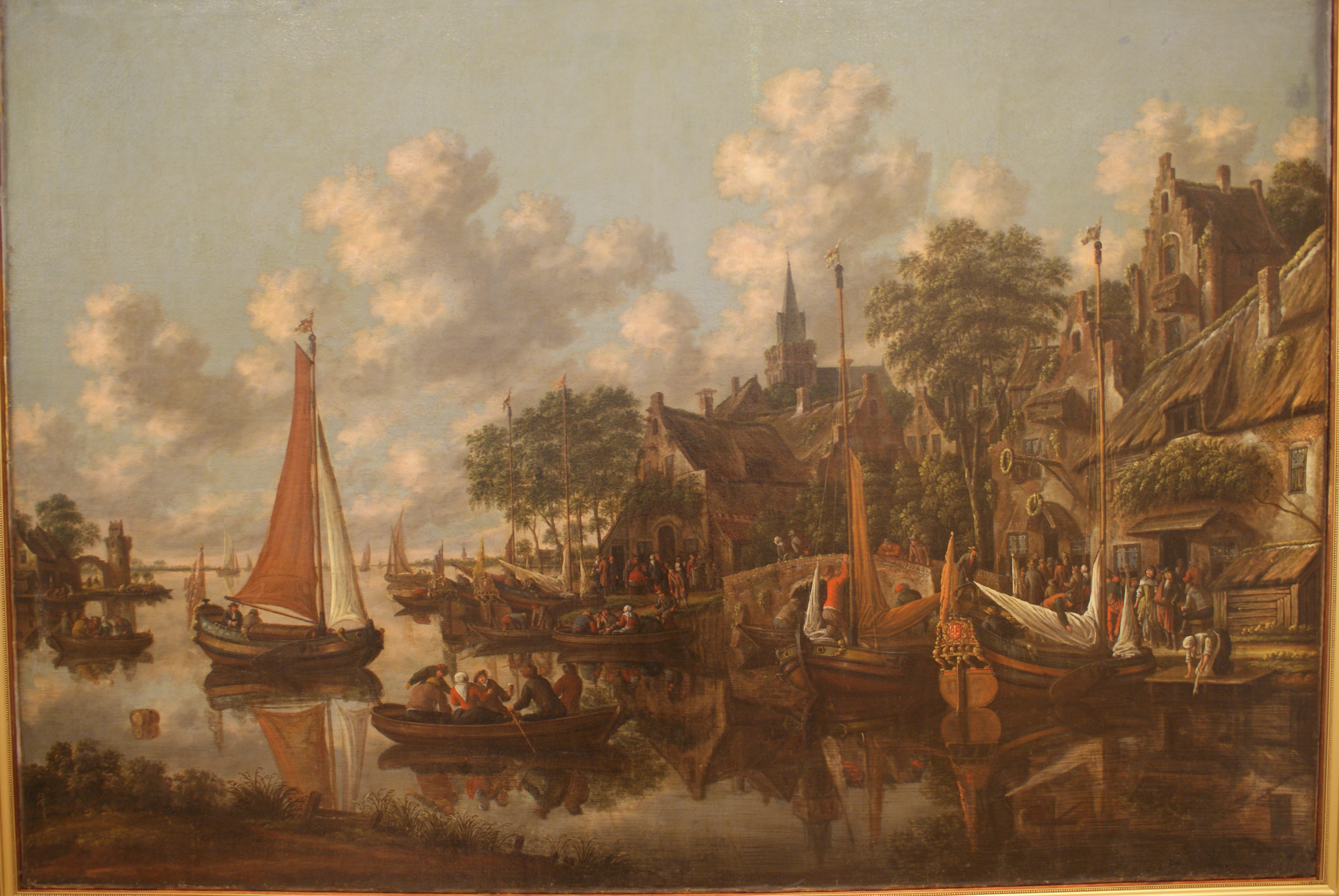
Thomas Heeremans, Summer, 1689.

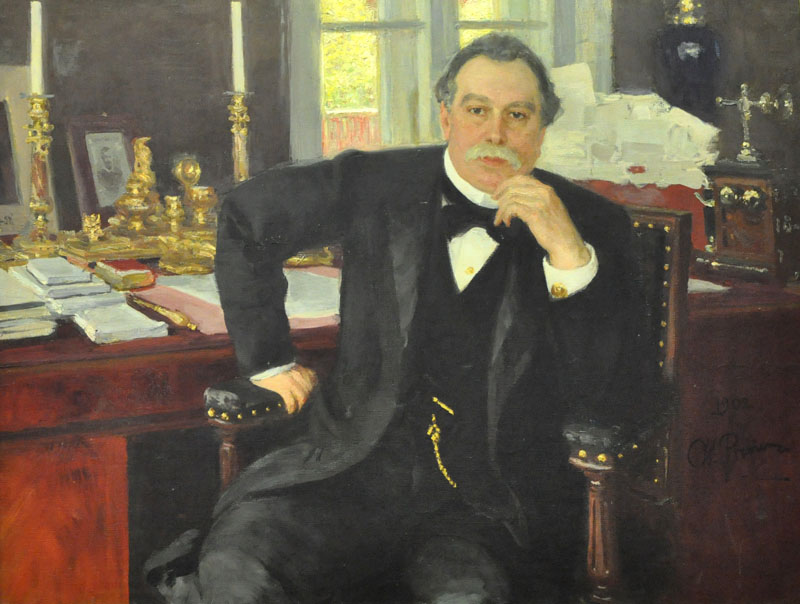
Ilya Repin, Portrait of Minister of the Interior Vyacheslav von Plehve. 1902. Oil on canvas.

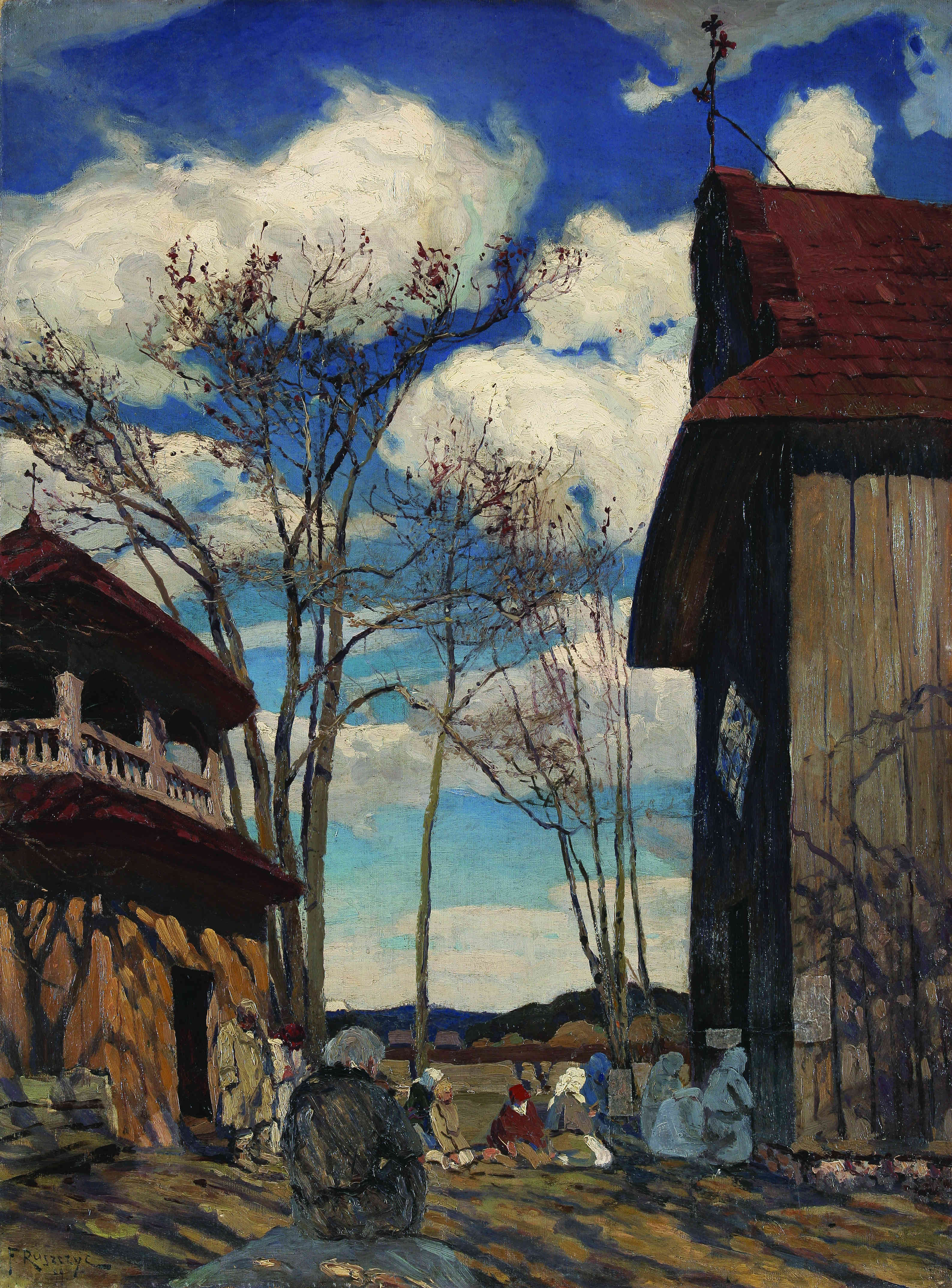
Ferdynand Ruszczyc, Near church. 1899.

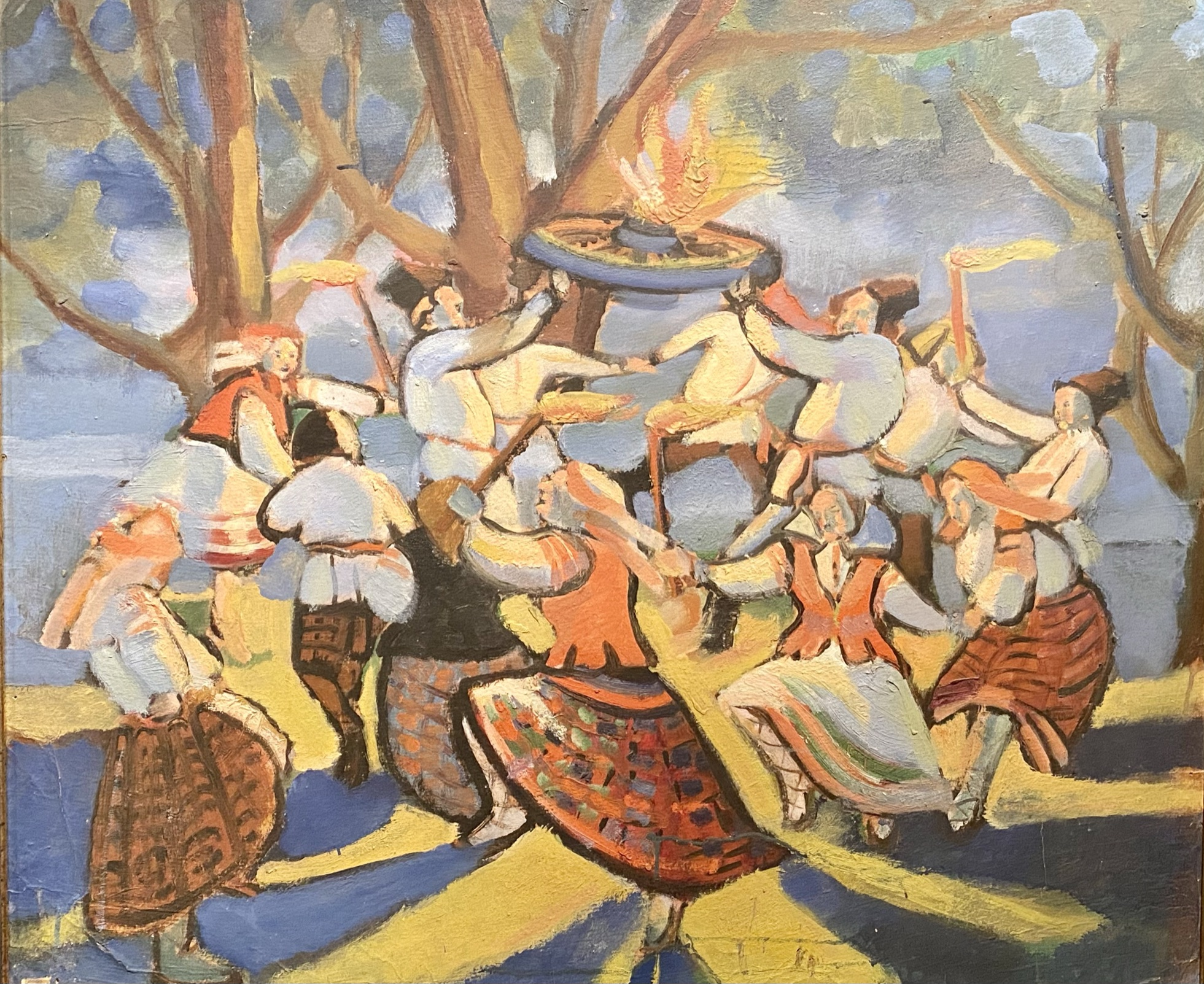
Mikhail Filippovich. Midsummer night. 1921-1922. Oil on cardboard.

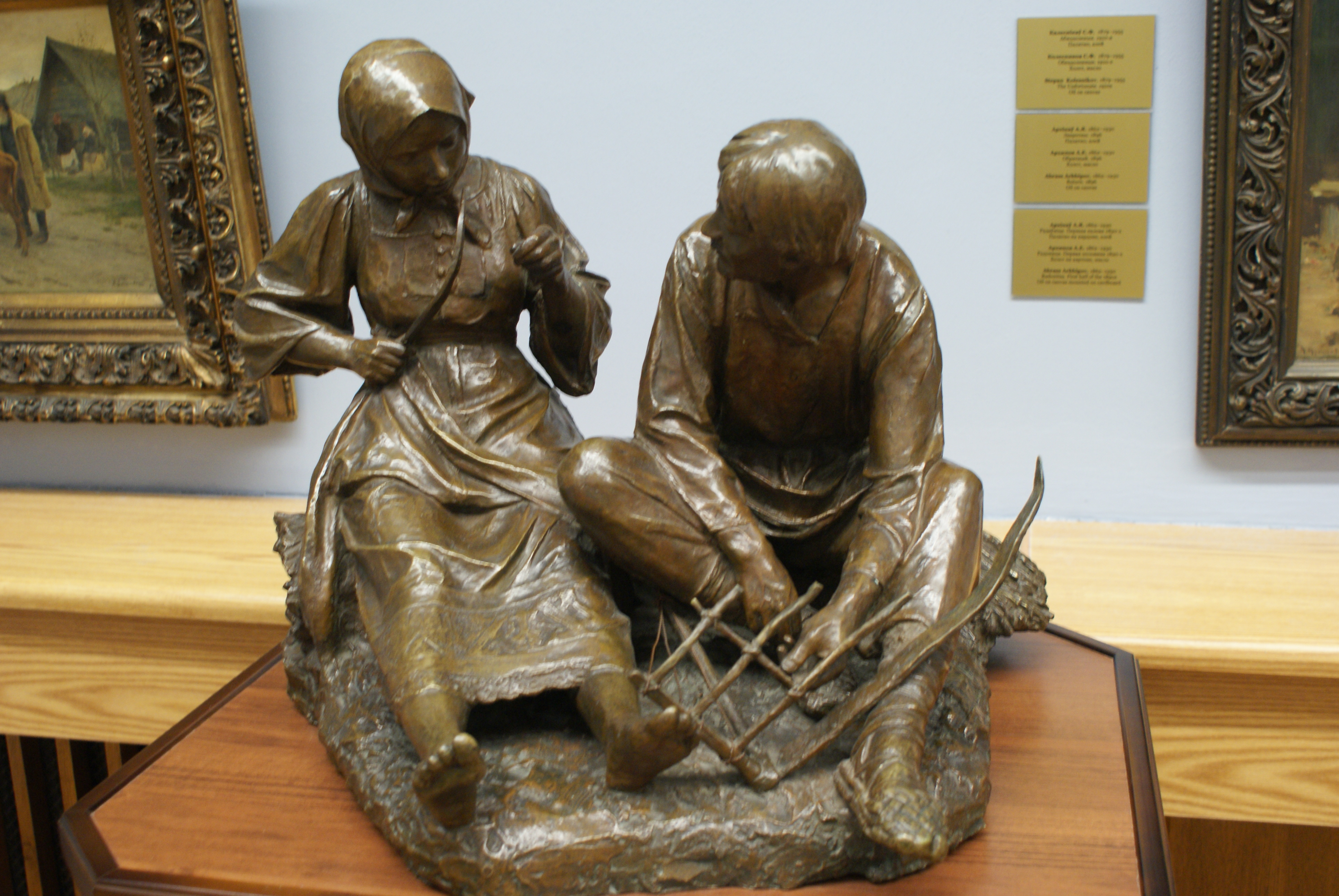
Vladimir Beklemishev. Village love. 1896. Bronze.

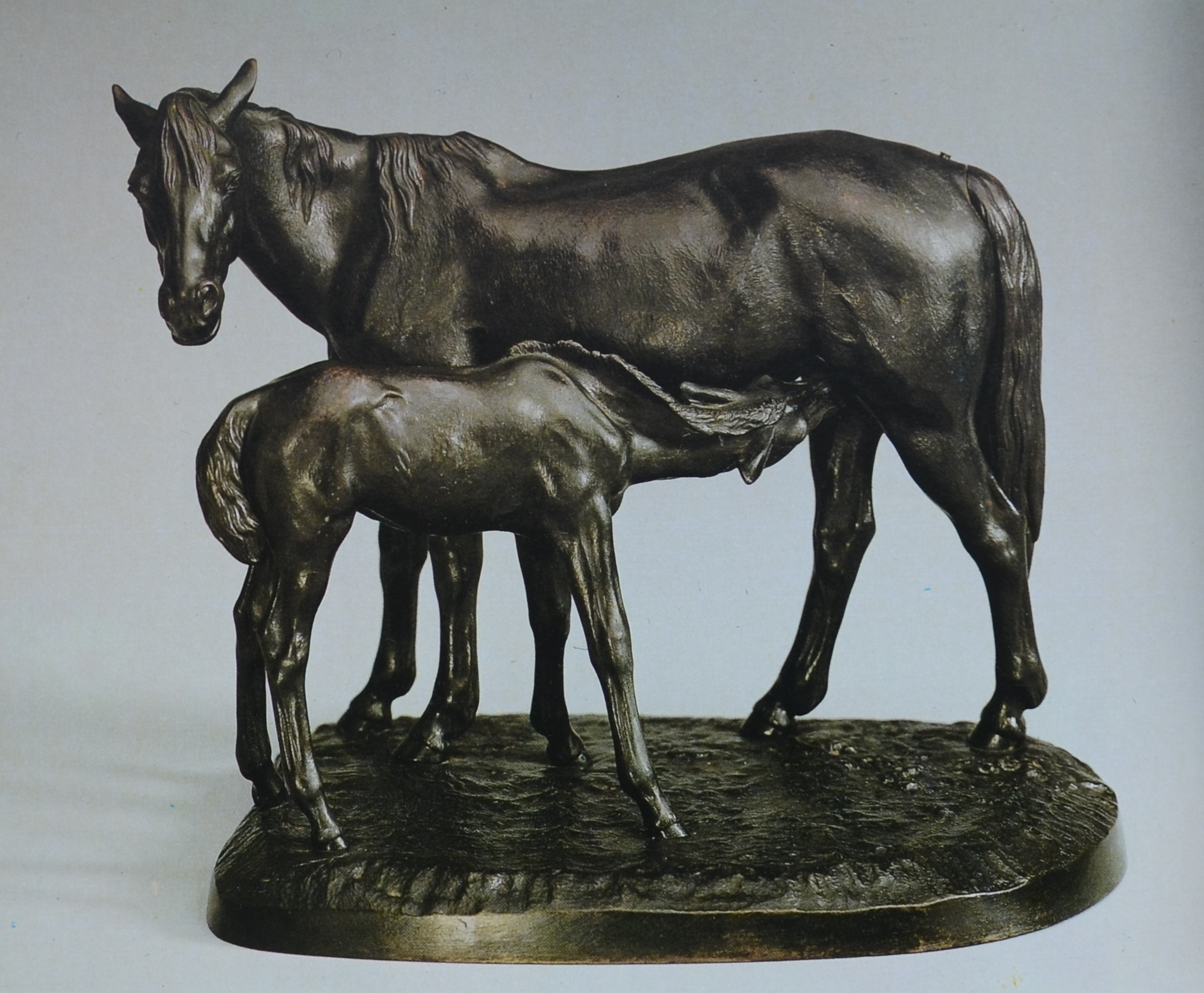
Peter Clodt von Jürgensburg. A mare with a colt, 1854.

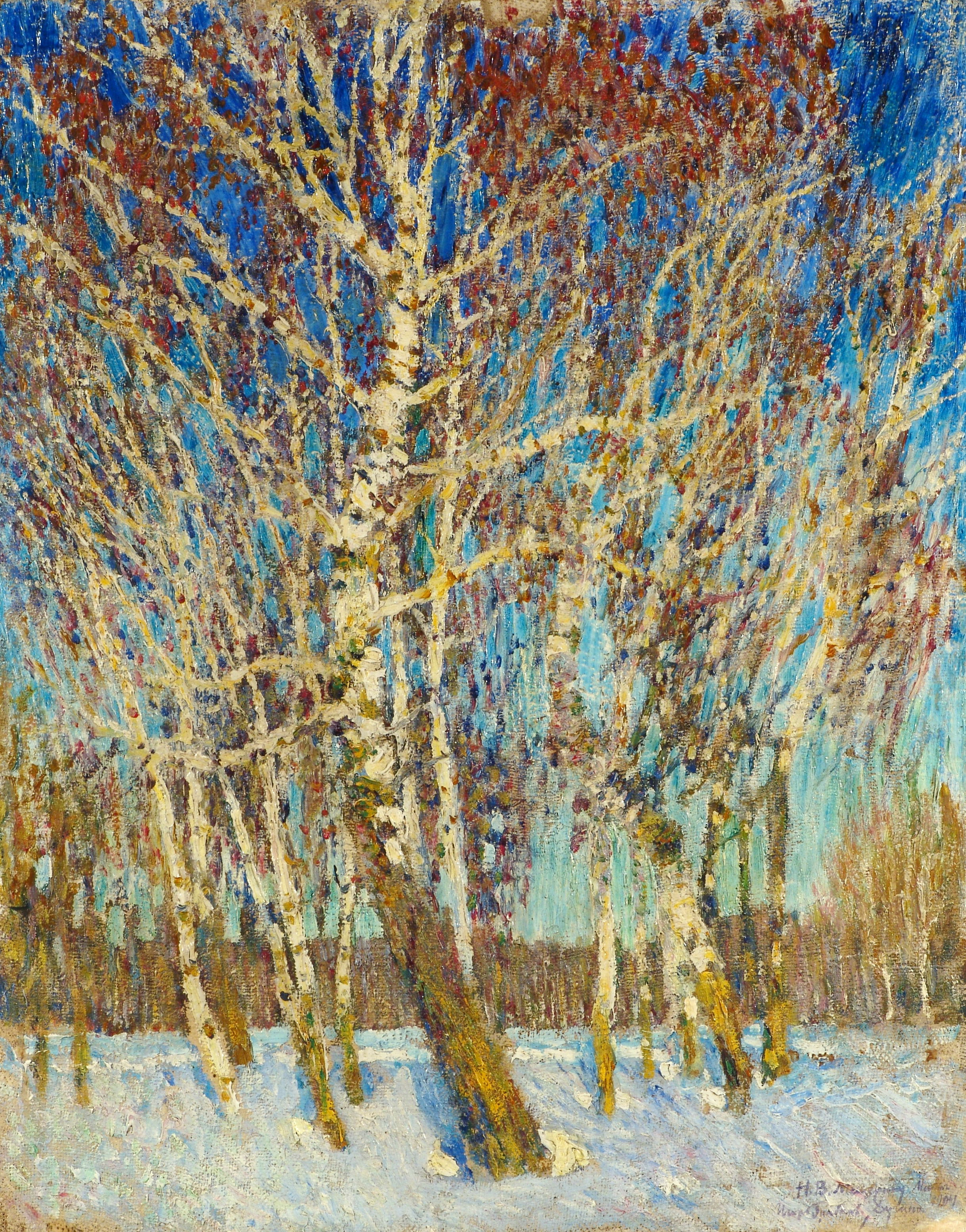
February Azure, a study by Igor Grabar, 1904

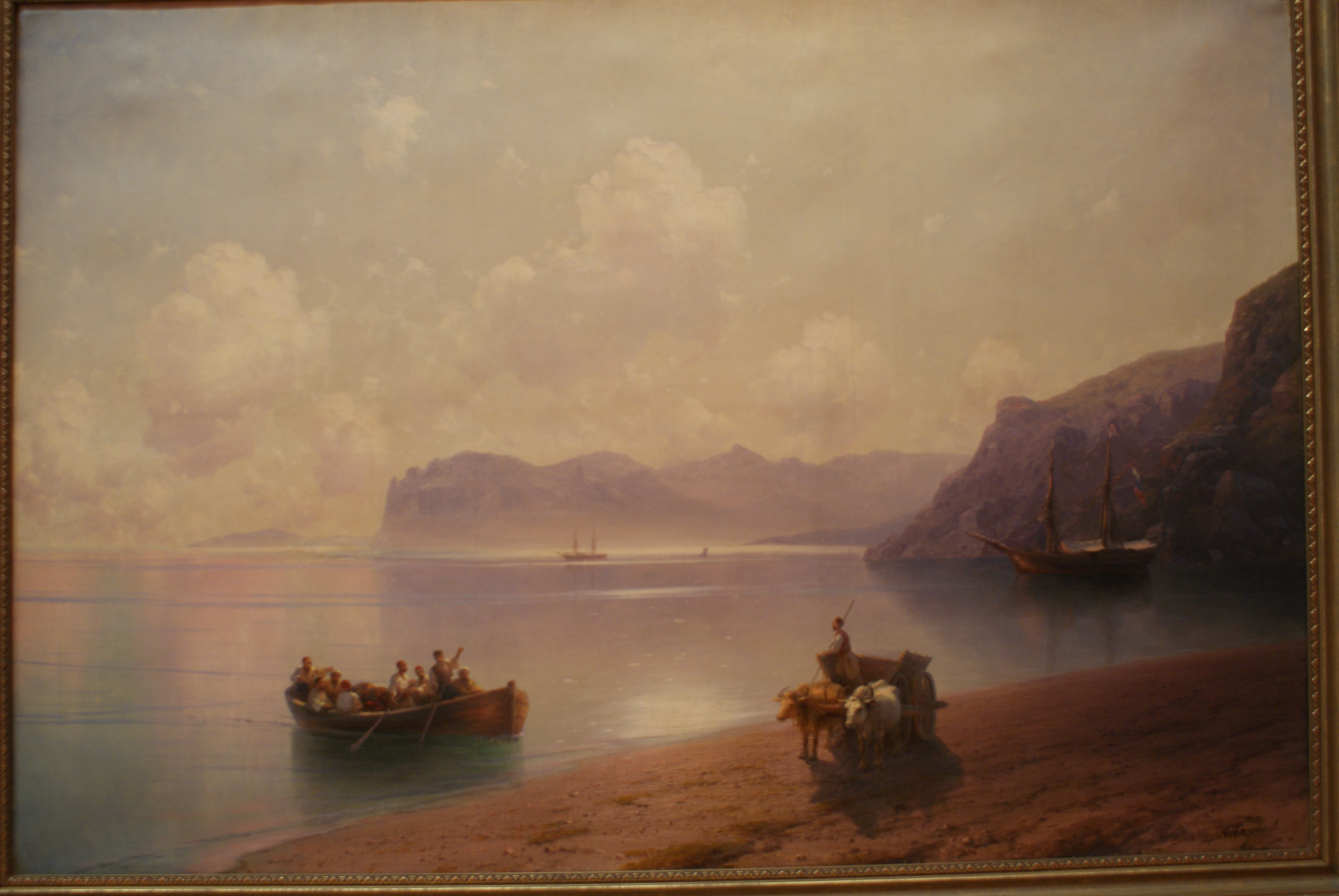
Ivan Aivazovsky, Morning on the sea, 1883

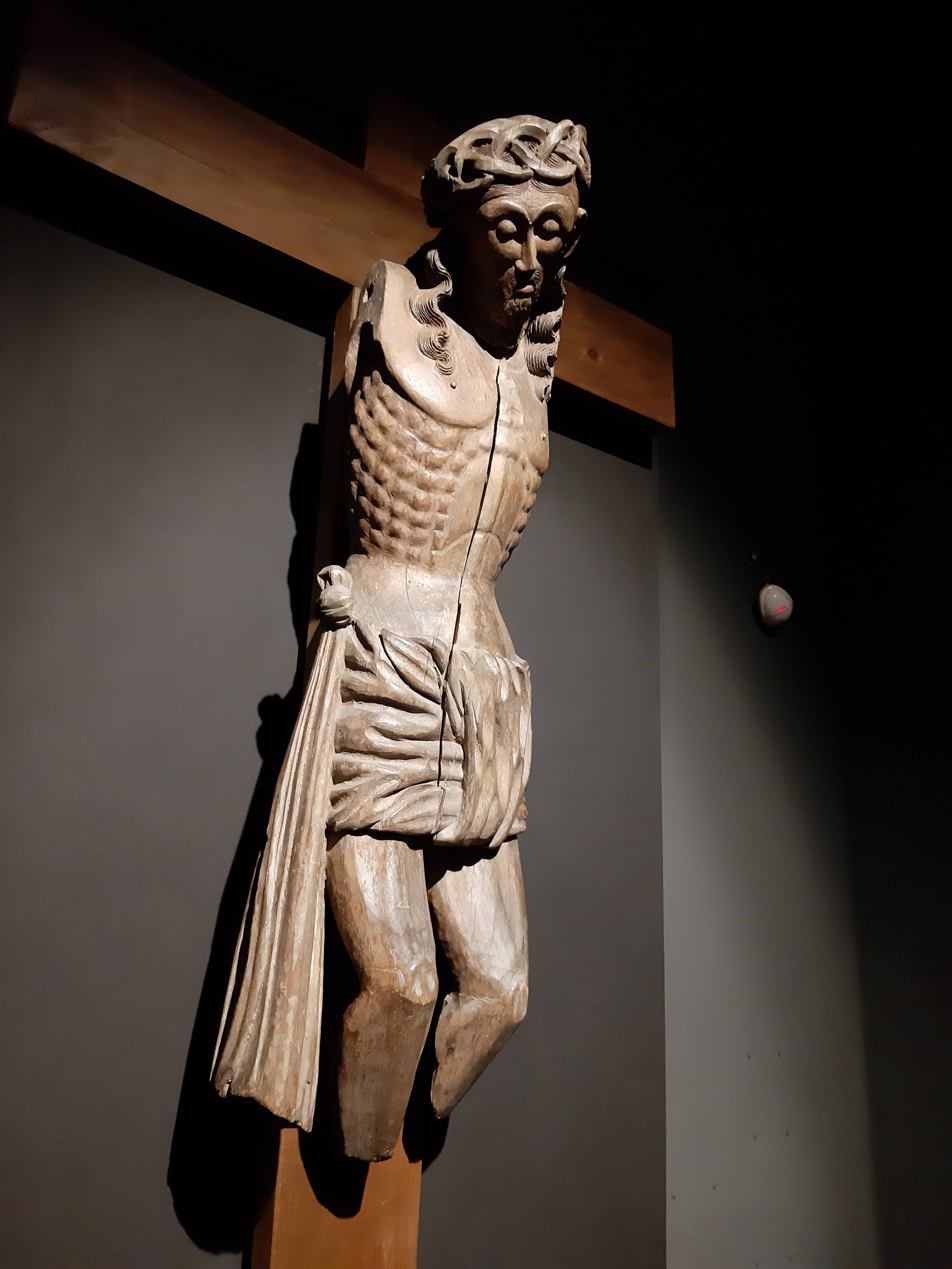
Crucifix from the Mstsislau Church Museum, c. 17th century
