= Vitebsk Museum of Modern Art =

Defunct museum in Vitebsk

Coordinates: 55.1933°N 30.2056°E

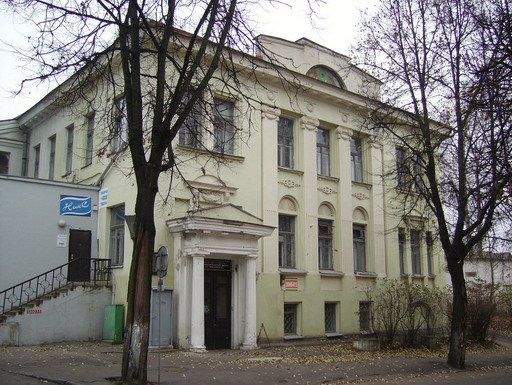
The building of the People's Art School where the Vitebsk Museum of Modern Art was situated

Vitebsk Museum of Modern Art (Belarusian: Віцебскі Музей Сучаснага Мастацтва) was an art museum in Vitebsk, Belarus organized in 1918 by Marc Chagall, Kazimir Malevich and Alexander Romm. In 1921, it exhibited 120 paintings "representing all the movements of the contemporary art from the Academic Realism to Impressionism to Suprematism". In the mid-1920s, the museum was closed. While some paintings have found their way to museums of Russia and Belarus, the whereabouts of many of them are unknown.

== History ==
The museum's history started in 1918. On 12 September 1918, painter Marc Chagall, then the Commissar of Arts for Vitebsk Region, went to Petrograd for getting the official approval for his idea to organize a Museum of Modern Art in Vitebsk. On 14 November 1918, a newspaper published information that the works on organization of museum of modern arts had started in Vitebsk.

The Museum was organized in the building of the People's Art School (Народное Художественное Училище) on 10 Bukharin Street. The museum was headed by Chagall and Malevich and later by Alexander Romm who was appointed the Chief of Vitebsk Commission on preservation of Heritage and Arts on 15 January 1920. In parallel the same building also hosted another art museum, the so-called School Museum for the works of the graduates of the People's Art School. The second museum was organized on 8 July 1919.

In the 1920s, the museum got a significant collection of the contemporary painting. In spring 1921 Alexander Romm wrote about 120 paintings "representing all the movements of the contemporary art from the Academic Realism to Impressionism to Suprematism. Almost all contemporary painters are represented in the collection by their serious characteristic works". Today 90 paintings of the museum are known (some may belong to the School Museum. The painters included Nathan Altman, Abram Brazer, David Burliuk, Marc Chagall, Aleksandra Ekster, Robert Falk, Sergei Gerasimov, Natalia Goncharova, Alexander Ivanovich Ivanov, Wassily Kandinsky, Ivan Kliun, Pyotr Konchalovsky, Konstantin Korovin, Nikolai Krymov, Pavel Kuznetsov, Alexander V. Kuprin, Mikhail Larionov, Aristarkh Lentulov, Kazimir Malevich, Ilya Mashkov, Vassily Millioti, Alexey Morgunov, Alexander Osmerkin, Yakov Pain, Vera Pestel, Lyubov Popova, Yehuda Pen, Alexander Rodchenko, Vasily Rozhdestvensky, Olga Rozanova, Alexander Romm, Nikolay Sinezubov, Konstantin Somov, Varvara Stepanova, Władysław Strzemiński, Aleksandr Shevchenko, David Shterenberg, Solomon Yudovin, Nicolay Paskevich.

The museum was opened to public in July 1920. In July–October 1922, 23 paintings were moved to Petrograd. To the 1 April 1923 only 35 works left. In 1925 there were signals that paintings of avant garde artists from the museum are cut for canvas by the students of Art School. On 26 September 1925, the surviving 32 paintings were transferred to Vitebsk Regional Museum. Most of them were transferred to the Belarusian National Arts Museum in Minsk in 1939. After World War II only one work from the former Vitebsk Museum of Modern Arts was left in Vitebsk: a small still life by David Sternberg. Besides this painting the whereabouts of only 25 are known: 19 paintings are in State Russian Museum in Saint Petersburg, four paintings are in Belarusian National Arts Museum in Minsk and one painting is in the Kawamura Museum of Modern Art in Japan.

== Bibliography ==
- Бандарэнка А. Гісторыя аднаго музея // Літаратура і мастацтва. 1989. 28 чэрвеня. С.12
- Карасик И. Петроградский музей художественной культуры // Музей в музее. Русский авангард из коллекции Музея художественной культуры в собрании Государственного Русского музея. СПб.: ГРМ, 1998. С.15-17
- Горячева Т.В. «Директория новаторов»: Уновис – группа, идеология, альманах // Уновис No.1. Витебск 1920. Факсимильное издание. М.: Издательство СканРус, 2003. С.12-13 (приложение)
- Исаков Г.П. Из истории коллекции Витебского музея современного искусства (1919-1941 гг.) // Веснік Віцебскага дзяржаўнага універсітэта. 2001. No.1. С.53-58
- Михневич Л.В. К вопросу об истории витебского Музея современного (левого) искусства // Русский авангард: проблемы репрезентации и интерпретации: Сб. стат. СПб.: Palace Editions, 2001. С. 37–44
- Михневич Л.В. История витебского Музея современного (левого) искусства // Мастацкі музей у кантэксце нацыянальнай культуры на мяжы тысячагоддзяў. Стан. Праблемы. Развіццё: Матэрыялы навуковай канферэнцыі. Мн.: ТАА «Белпрынт», 2004. С.52-66
- Шатских А.С. Витебск. Жизнь искусства 1917–1922. Москва: Языки русской культуры, 2001. С.158-161. (в переводе на англ. яз.: Shatskikh, Aleksandra Semenovna. Vitebsk : the life of art. New Haven: Yale University Press, 2007)
- Крусанов А.В. Русский авангард: 1907–1932. В 3 т. Футуристическая революция (1917–1921). М., 2003. Т.2. Кн.1. С.122- 123.
- Шишанов В. А. Витебский Музей современного искусства: история создания и коллекции. 1918–1941. Минск: Медисонт, 2007. 144 с.
- Шишанов В. А. Витебский музей современного искусства: история создания и коллекции (1918-1941)
- Шишанов, В. Витебский музей современного искусства: история создания и коллекции (1918–1941) / В. Шишанов. // Малевич. Классический авангард. Витебск – 11: [альманах / ред. Т. Котович]. – Минск: Экономпресс, 2009. – С.80-181.
- Изобразительное искусство Витебска 1918 - 1923 гг. в местной периодической печати : библиограф. указ. и тексты публ. / сост. В. А. Шишанов. - Минск : Медисонт,2010. - 264 с.
