= International E-road network =

Numbering system for roads in Europe

E-road network
- Markers for E40 and E018

- Map of the E-road network

System information
- Formed: 16 September 1950

Highway names
- E-road: European route nn (Enn or E nn)

System links
- International E-road network; A Class; B Class

The International E-road network is a numbering system for roads in Europe, Central Asia and Asia Minor, developed by the United Nations Economic Commission for Europe (UNECE). The network is numbered from E1 up and signposted on a green background. Its roads cross national borders, consisting of three types of roads: motorways, express roads, and ordinary roads (as defined by ECE/TRANS/SC.1/2016/3/Rev.1).

The display of European roads on signs depend on jurisdiction. In most countries, the roads carry the European route designation alongside national designations. However, Belgium, Denmark, Norway and Sweden have integrated them as their sole route designations (examples: E18 and E6) in most cases. Some places, such as the United Kingdom and Albania do not show the European designations at all.

== History ==
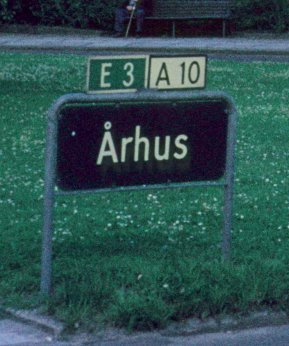
E3 in Denmark, before 1992: Changed to E45; the number E3 was re-attributed.

UNECE was formed in 1947, and their first major act to improve transport was a joint UN declaration no. 1264, the Declaration on the Construction of Main International Traffic Arteries, signed in Geneva on 16 September 1950, which defined the first E-road network. Originally it was envisaged that the E-road network would be a highway system comparable to the US Interstate Highway System. The declaration was amended several times until 15 November 1975, when it was replaced by the European Agreement on Main International Traffic Arteries or "AGR", which set up a route numbering system and improved standards for roads in the list. The AGR last went through a major change in 1992 and in 2001 was extended into Central Asia to include the Caucasus nations. There were several minor revisions since, the last ones occurring in 2008 (as of 2009).

== Numbering system ==
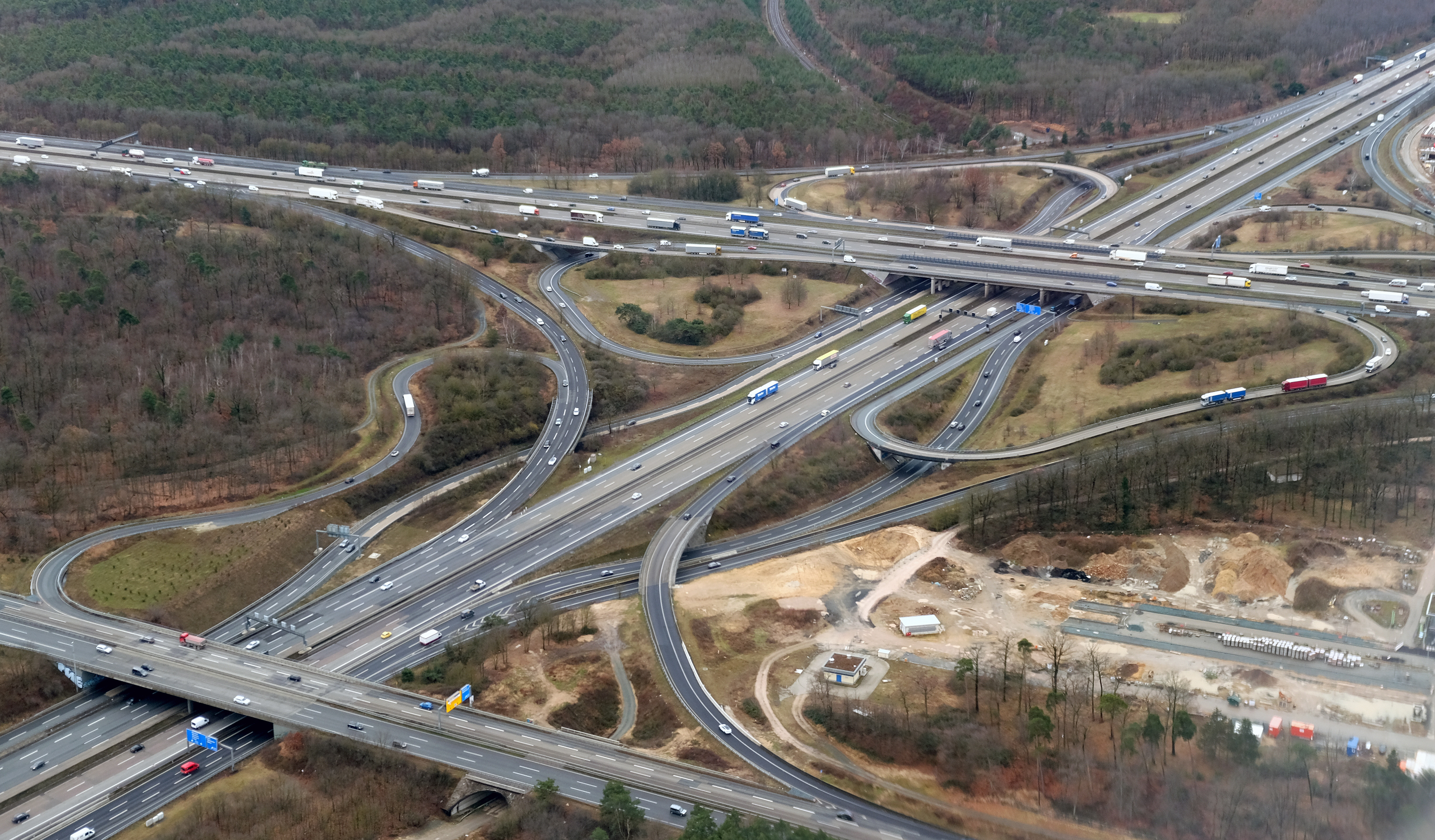
Intersection of E42 and E451 near Frankfurt Airport

The route numbering system is as follows:

- Reference roads and intermediate roads, called Class-A roads, have numbers from 1 to 129.
  - North–south routes have odd numbers; east–west routes have even numbers. The two main exceptions are E4 and E6, both north–south routes.
  - The allocation of numbers progresses upwards from west to east and from north to south, with some exceptions.
- Branch, link and connecting roads, called Class-B roads, have three-digit numbers above 130.
- Reference roads are roads numbered 5–95 ending with 0 or 5 or having odd numbers 101–129. They generally go across Europe and are usually several thousand kilometres long.
  - North–south reference roads have numbers that end with the digit 5 from 5 to 95, or odd numbers from 101 to 129, increasing from west to east.
  - East-west reference roads have two-digit numbers that end with the digit 0, increasing from north to south.
- Intermediate roads are roads numbered 1 to 99 that are not reference roads. They are usually considerably shorter than the reference roads. They have numbers between those of the reference roads between which they are located. Like reference roads, north–south intermediate roads have odd numbers; east–west roads have even numbers.
- Class-B roads have three-digit numbers: the first digit is that of the nearest reference road to the north, the second digit is that of the nearest reference road to the west, and the third digit is a serial number.
- North–south Class-A roads located eastwards of road E99 have three-digit odd numbers from 101 to 129. Other rules for Class-A roads above apply to these roads.
- Class-B roads located eastwards of E101 have 3-digit numbers beginning with 0, from 001 to 099.

=== Exceptions ===
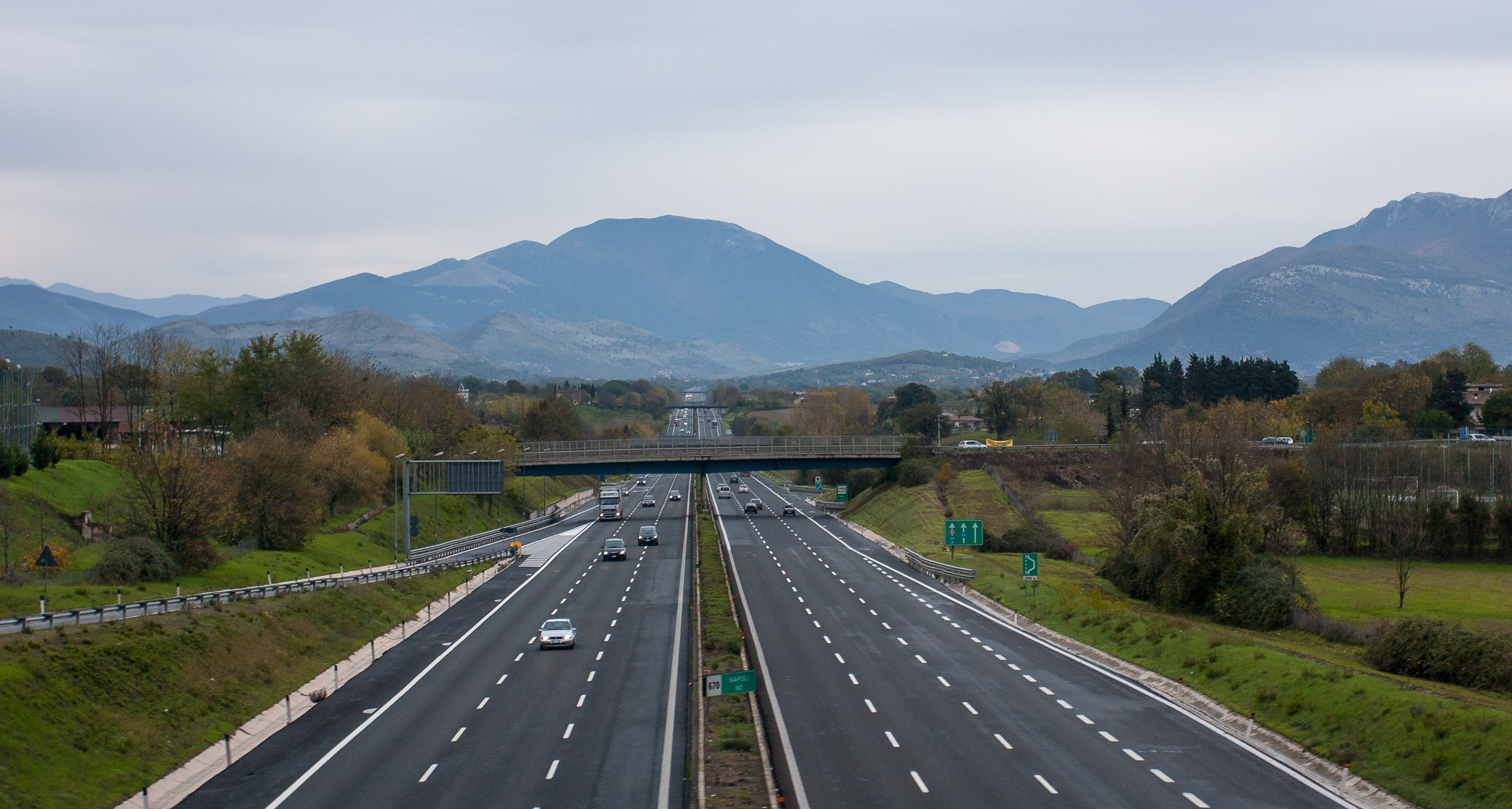
The European route E45 near Cassino, Italy

In the first established and approved version, the road numbers were well ordered. Since then, a number of exceptions to this principle have been allowed.

Two Class-A roads, E6 and E4 were originally scheduled to be renamed into E47 and E55, respectively. However, since Sweden and Norway have integrated the E-roads into their national networks, signposted as E6 and E4 throughout, a decision was made to keep the pre-1992 numbers for the roads in those two countries. These exceptions were granted because of the excessive expense connected with re-signing not only the long routes themselves, but also the associated road network in the area. The new numbers are, however, used from Denmark and southward, though, as do other European routes within Scandinavia. These two roads are the most conspicuous exceptions to the rule that even numbers signify west–east E-roads.

Further exceptions are:

- E67, going from Finland to the Czech Republic (wrong side of E75 and E77), assigned around year 2000, simply because it was best available number for this new route.
- Most of E63 in Finland (wrong side of E75)
- Part of E8 in Finland on the wrong side of E12 after a lengthening around 2002
- E82 (Spain and Portugal, wrong side of E80).

These irregularities exist because it is hard to maintain good order when extending the network, and the UNECE want to avoid changing road numbers.

Because the Socialist People's Republic of Albania refused to participate in international treaties such as the AGR, it was conspicuously excluded from the route scheme, with E65 and E90 making noticeable detours to go around it. In the 1990s, Albania opened up to the rest of Europe, but only ratified the AGR in August 2006, so its integration into the E-road network remains weak.

== Signage ==
Where the European routes are signed, green signs with white numbers are used.

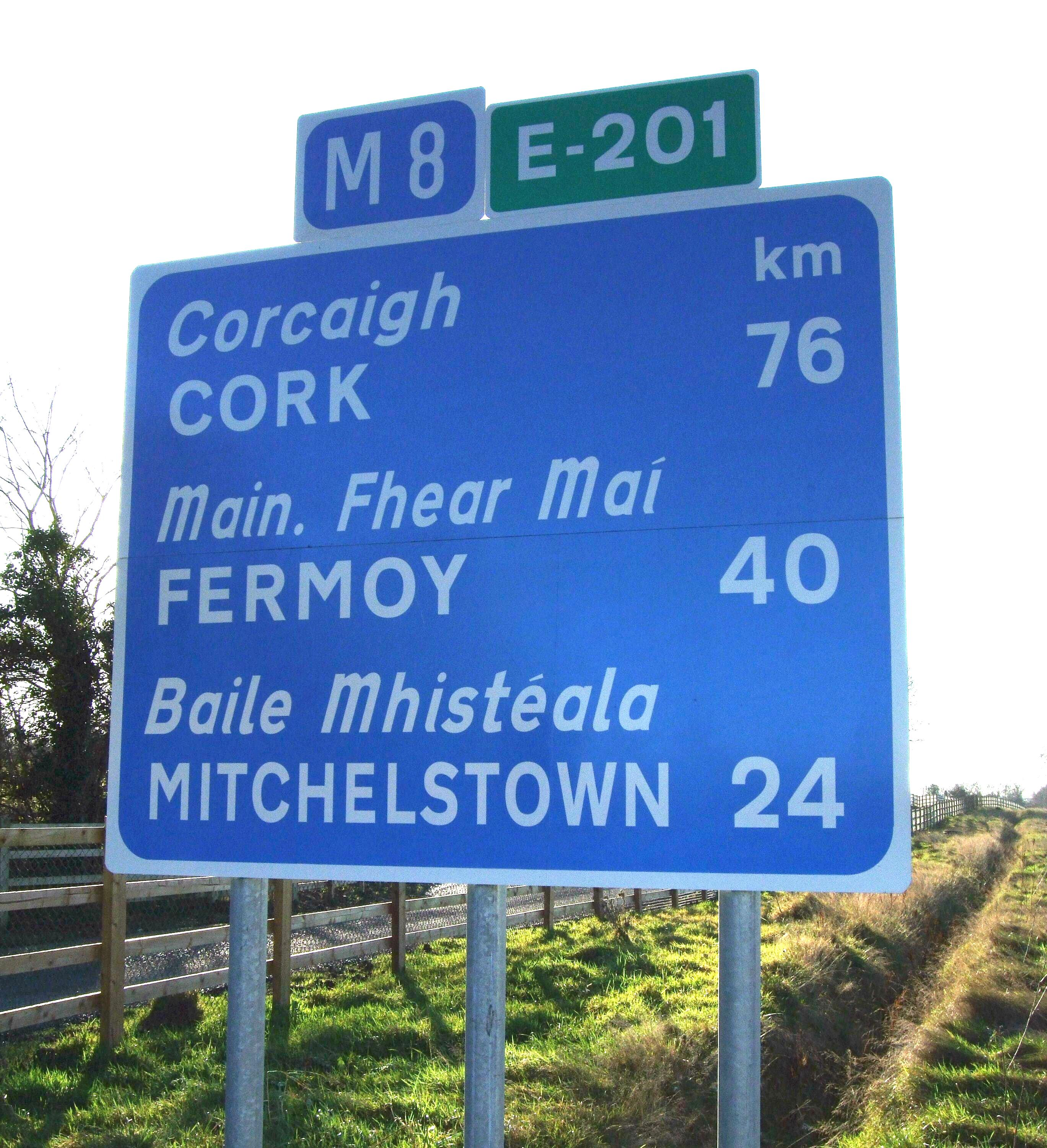
The E201 in Ireland

There are different strategies for determining how frequently to signpost the roads.

- Sweden, Norway and Denmark have integrated the E-road numbers into their networks, meaning that the roads usually have no other national number.
- In Belgium, E-numbers are traditionally associated with motorways, even though other grade E-roads pass through the country. As a result, the E-number is signposted (and referred to) only on the motorway portions of the E-road network, while for non-motorways only the national number (if any) is shown. On the motorway portions of the E-network, the E-numbers are the standard and thus referred to in news bulletins rather than the national number. Serbia and Italy have a similar principle.
- In most countries the E-roads form a network on top of the national network. The green signs are frequent enough to show how to follow the roads, but do not usually show how to reach them.
- In some countries, like Croatia, Bulgaria and Albania, E-roads are well signposted, but they sometimes follow older routes instead of motoways.
- In some countries, like Germany, Italy and Greece, E-roads are signposted only on motorways and main road itineraries.
- In Ireland the signposting of E-roads is specified in Chapter 2 of the 2010 Traffic Signs Manual published by the Department of Transport, and specifies that E-roads are to be signed on route confirmation signs only. The first E-road numbers were signed in July 2007 on the N11 bypass in Gorey. Since then they have gradually spread across the E-road network in Ireland.
- In a few European countries such as the United Kingdom, Albania, and many Asian countries such as Uzbekistan, the E-roads are not signposted at all.

== Road design standards ==
The following design standards should be applied to Euroroutes unless there are exceptional circumstances (such as mountain passes etc.):

- Built-up areas shall be by-passed if they constitute a hindrance or a danger.
- The roads should preferably be motorways or express roads (unless traffic density is low so that there is no congestion on an ordinary road).
- They should be homogeneous and be designed for at least 80 km/h (50 mph) (see Design speed). The motorways should be at least 100 km/h (60 mph).
- Gradients should not exceed 8% on roads designed for 80 km/h (50 mph), decreasing to 4% on roads designed for 120 km/h (75 mph) traffic.
- The radius of curved sections of road should be a minimum of 120 m (390 ft) on roads designed for 60 km/h (35 mph) rising to 1,000 m (3,300 ft) on roads designed for 140 km/h (85 mph).
- "Stopping distance visibility" should be at least 70 m (230 ft) on roads designed for 60 km/h (35 mph), rising to 300 m (980 ft) on roads designed for 140 km/h (85 mph).
- Lane width should be at least 3.5 m (11 ft) on straight sections of road. This guarantees adequate clearance for any vehicle having a superstructure of width 2.5 m (8.2 ft) which is the maximum specified width in Directive 2002/7/EC of the European Parliament and of the Council which recognize some specific tolerances for some specific countries.
- The shoulder is recommended to be at least 2.5 m (8.2 ft) on ordinary roads and 3.25 m (10.7 ft) on motorways.
- Central reservations should be at least 3 m (9.8 ft) unless there is a barrier between the two carriageways.
- Overhead clearance should be not less than 4.5 m (15 ft).
- Railway intersections should be at different levels.

These requirements are meant to be followed for road construction. When new E-roads have been added these requirements have not been followed stringently. For example, the E45 in Sweden, added in 2006, has long parts with 6 m (20 ft) width or the E22 in eastern Europe forcing drivers to slow down to 30 km/h (20 mph) by taking the route through villages. In Norway, parts of the E10 are 5 m (16 ft) wide and in Central Asia even some gravel roads have been included.

== Cultural significance ==
In Belgium, for example, motorway E-numbers have taken on the same kind of persistent cultural integration and significance as M-numbers in the UK, or Interstate numbers in the United States. Local businesses will refer to, or even incorporate the road designator in their business name. The annual road cycling race "E3 Harelbeke" takes part of its name from the former E3 (the part between Antwerp and Lille was renamed E17 in 1992). The same applies to the retail chain "E5-mode" (E5-fashion) that started with shops easily accessible from the former E5 (renamed E40 in 1992).

In Sweden, the ice hockey games between HV71 from Jönköping and Linköping HC from Linköping have come to be called "the E4-derby".

In Norway, the band D.D.E. released a song named after E6.

== List of roads ==
=== Notes to the listings ===
In the road listings below, a dash ('–') indicates a land road connection between two towns/cities—the normal case—while an ellipsis ('...') denotes a stretch across water. Not all such places are connected by ferry, and operating ferry connections are usually run by private companies without support from the respective governments, i.e. they may cease operating at any time.

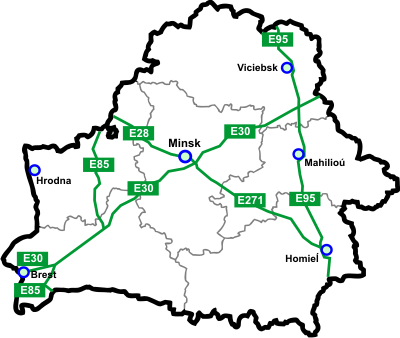
Belarus

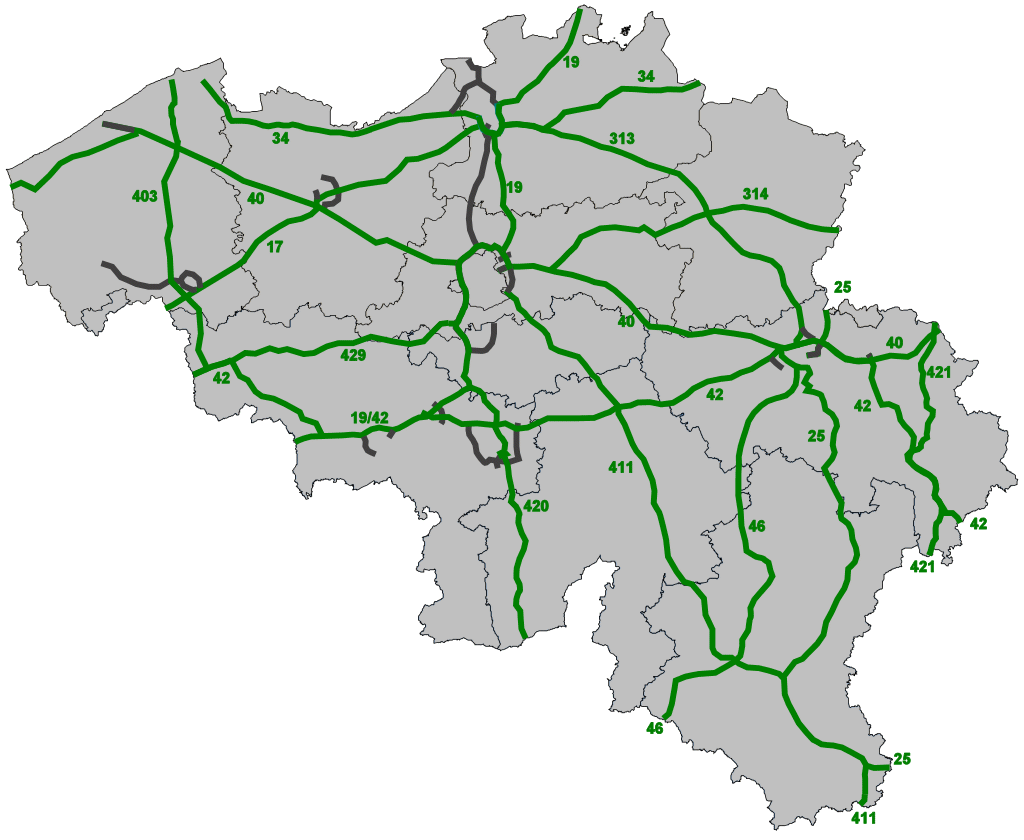
Belgium

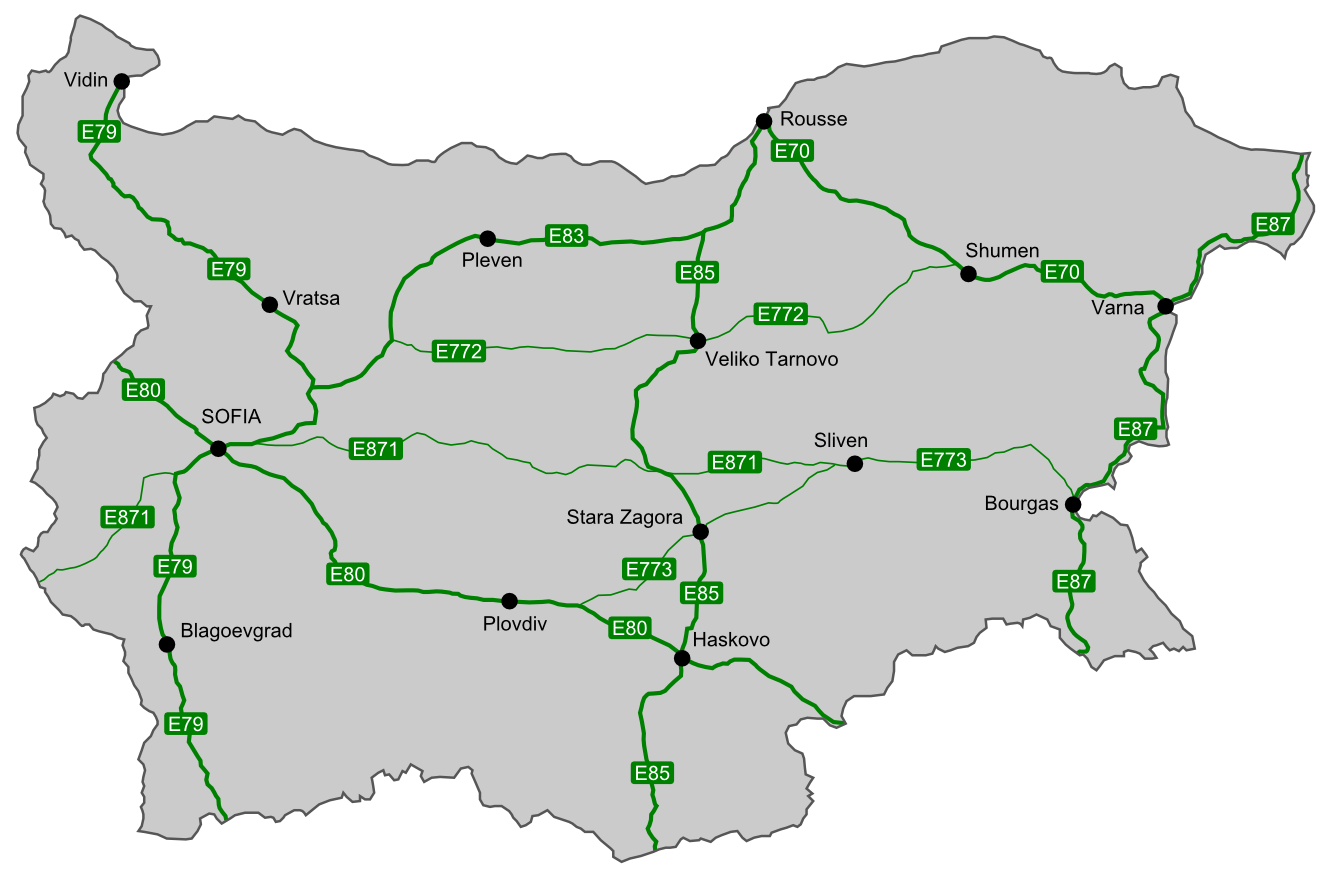
Bulgaria

Estonia

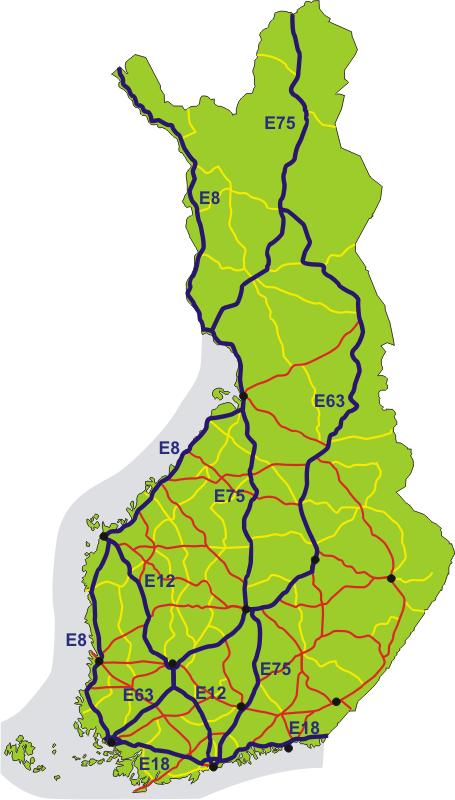
Finland

Georgia

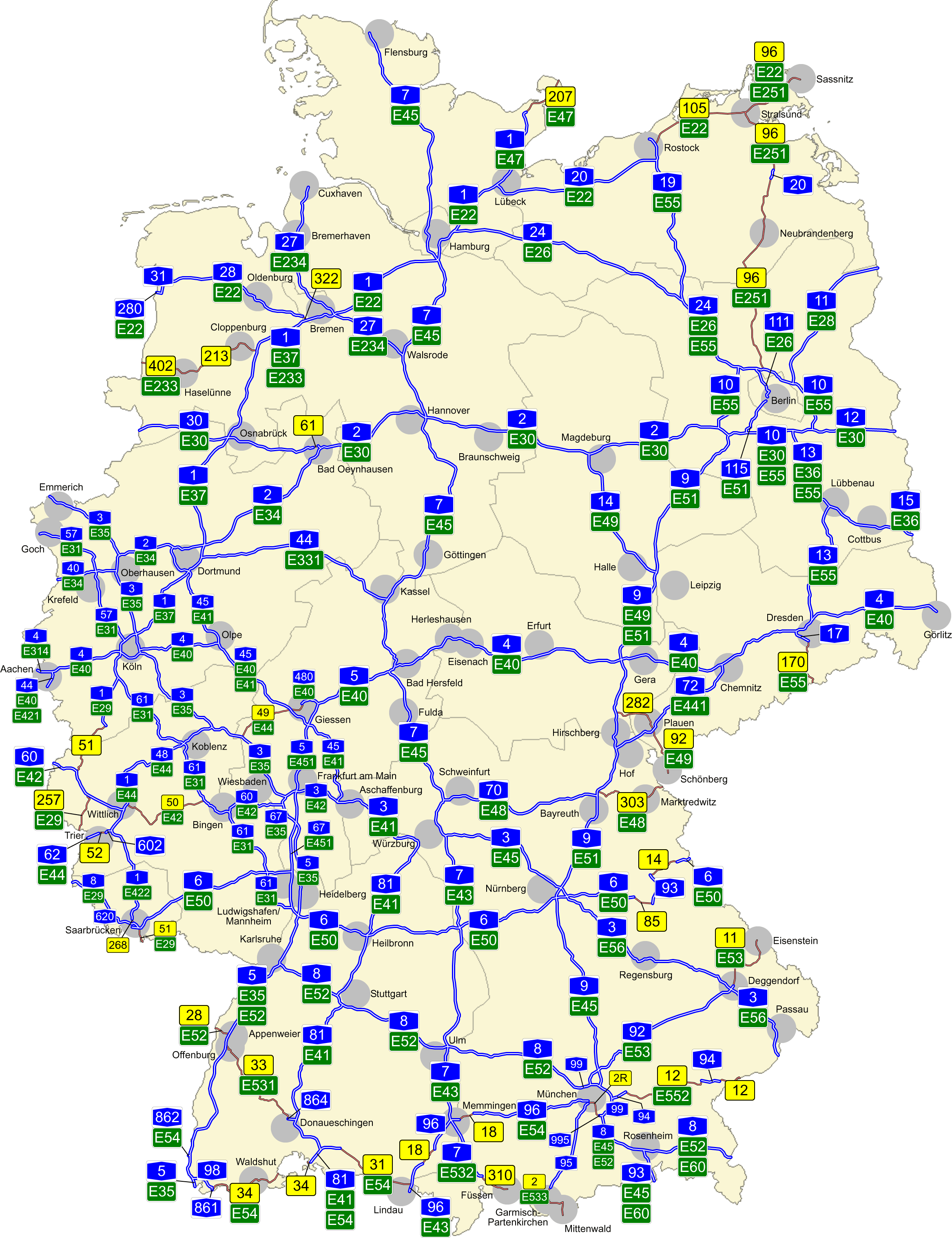
Germany

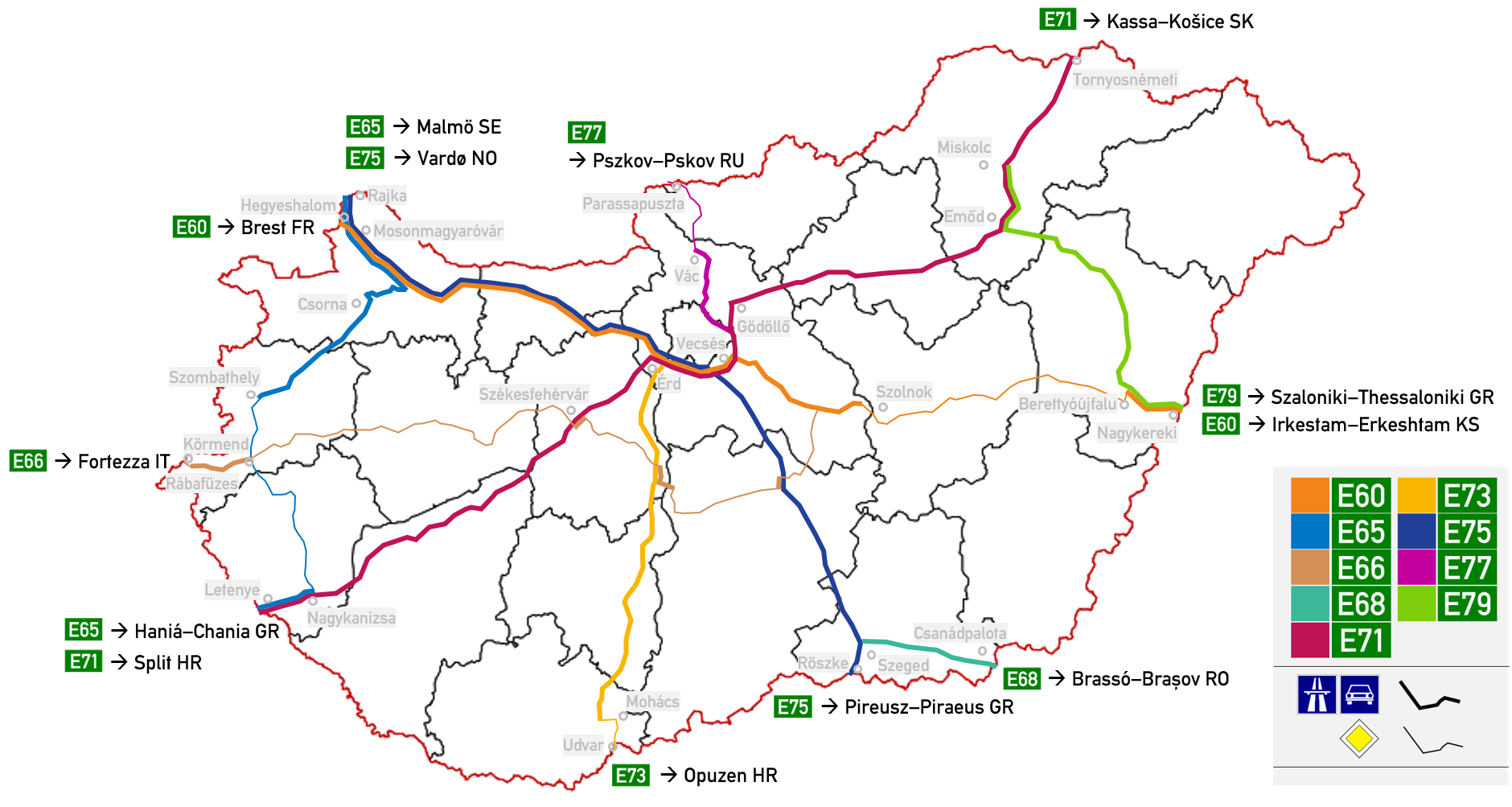
Hungary

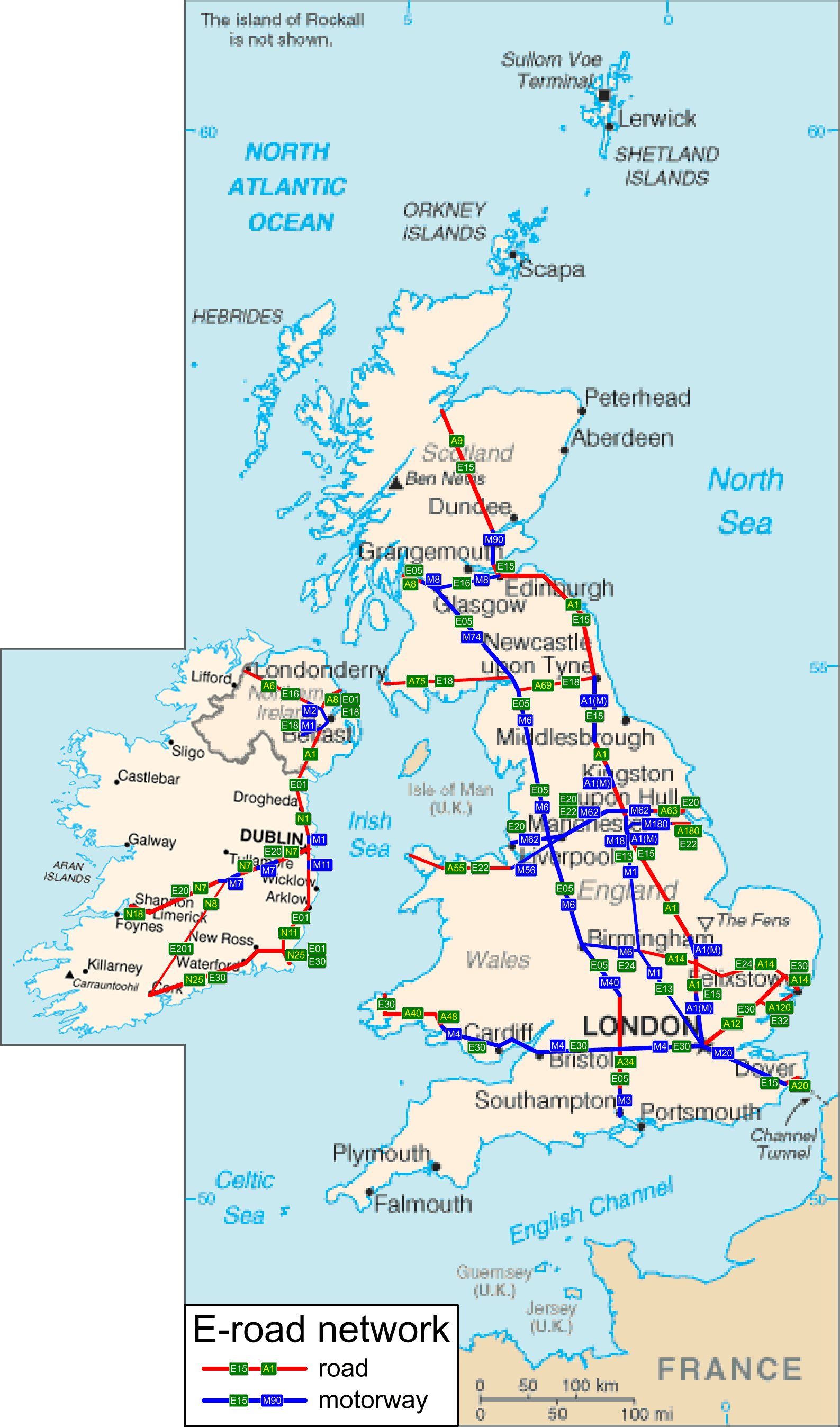
Ireland and the United Kingdom

Italy

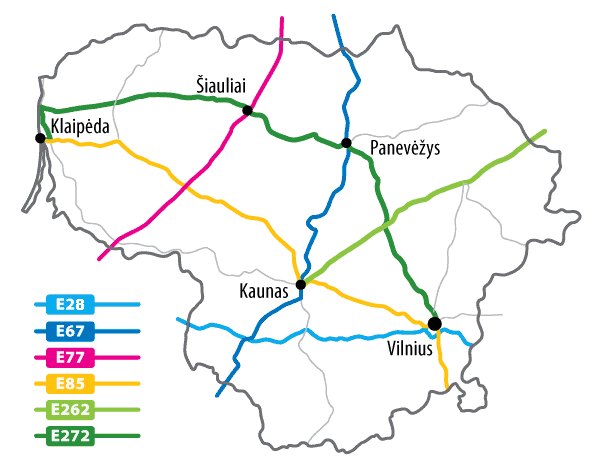
Lithuania

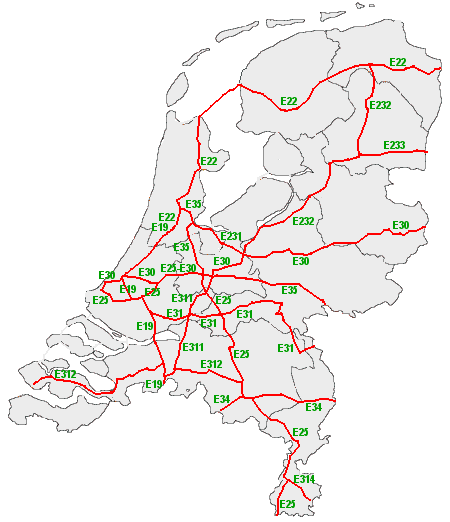
Netherlands

Poland (the map has an error about E462 as actually the route has also concurrency with E40 from near Katowice to Kraków)

Romania

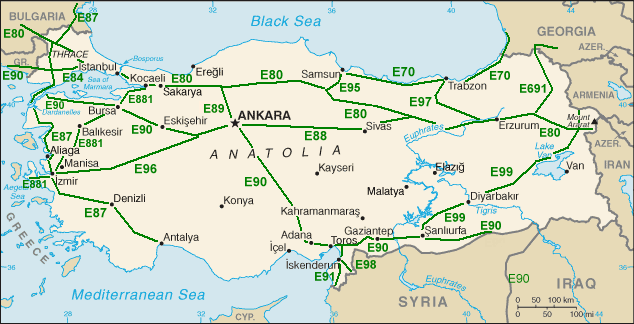
Turkey

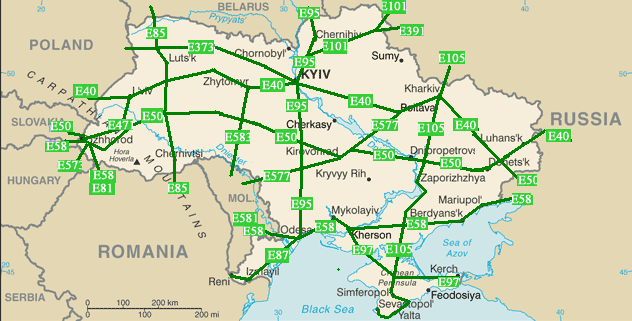
Ukraine

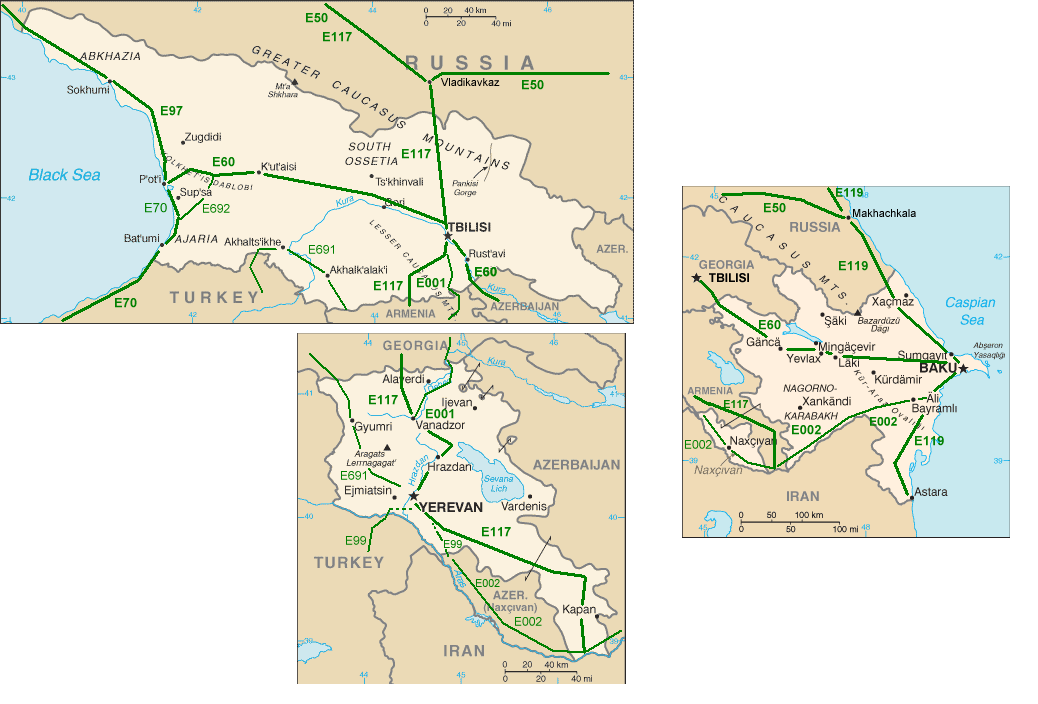
The southern Caucasus Countries: Armenia, Azerbaijan and Georgia

=== A Class roads ===
==== North–South reference ====
- – 2,960 km (1,840 mi): Greenock – Glasgow – Preston – Birmingham – Southampton ... Le Havre – Paris – Orléans – Bordeaux – San Sebastián – Burgos – Madrid – Seville – Algeciras
- – 3,590 km (2,230 mi): Inverness – Perth – Edinburgh – Newcastle – London – Folkestone – Dover ... Calais – Paris – Lyon – Orange – Narbonne – Girona – Barcelona – Tarragona – Castellón de la Plana – Valencia – Alicante – Murcia – Almería – Málaga – Algeciras
- – 1,830 km (1,140 mi): Hook of Holland – Rotterdam – Eindhoven – Maastricht – Liège – Bastogne – Arlon – Luxembourg – Metz – Saint-Avold – Strasbourg – Mulhouse – Basel – Olten – Bern – Lausanne – Geneva – Mont Blanc – Aosta – Ivrea – Vercelli – Alessandria – Genoa ... Bastia – Porto-Vecchio – Bonifacio ... Porto Torres – Sassari – Cagliari ... Palermo
- – 1,660 km (1,030 mi): Amsterdam – Utrecht – Arnhem – Emmerich – Oberhausen – Cologne – Frankfurt am Main – Heidelberg – Karlsruhe – Offenburg – Basel – Olten – Lucerne – Altdorf – Gotthard Pass – Bellinzona – Lugano – Chiasso – Como – Milan – Piacenza – Parma – Modena – Florence – Rome
- – 5,190 km (3,220 mi): Alta – Kautokeino – Karesuvanto – Arvidsjaur – Östersund – Mora – Säffle – Gothenburg ... Frederikshavn – Aalborg – Aarhus – Horsens - Vejle – Kolding – Flensburg – Hamburg – Hanover – Göttingen – Kassel – Fulda – Würzburg – Nuremberg – Munich – Rosenheim – Wörgl – Innsbruck – Brenner – Fortezza – Bolzano – Trento – Verona – Modena – Bologna – Cesena – Perugia – Fiano Romano – Naples – Salerno – Sicignano degli Alburni – Cosenza – Villa San Giovanni ... Messina – Catania – Siracusa – Rosolini – Gela
- – 2,920 km (1,810 mi): Helsingborg ... Helsingør – Copenhagen – Køge – Vordingborg – Farø – Nykøbing Falster – Gedser ... Rostock – Berlin – Lübbenau – Dresden – Ústí– Prague – Tábor – Linz – Salzburg – Villach – Tarvisio – Udine – Palmanova – Mestre – Ferrara – Ravenna – Cesena – Rimini – Fano – Ancona – Pescara – Foggia – Canosa di Puglia – Andria – Bari – Brindisi ... Igoumenitsa – Preveza – Rhion – Patras – Pyrgos – Kalamata (E4 was meant to be part of this route, but kept old number)
- – 3,800 km (2,400 mi): Malmö – Ystad ... Świnoujście – Wolin – Goleniów – Szczecin – Gryfino – Pyrzyce – Myślibórz – Gorzów Wielkopolski – Skwierzyna – Międzyrzecz – Świebodzin – Zielona Góra – Legnica – Jelenia Góra – Harrachov – Železný Brod – Turnov – Mladá Boleslav – Prague – Jihlava – Brno – Bratislava – Rajka – Csorna – Szombathely – Zalaegerszeg – Nagykanizsa – Letenye – Zagreb – Karlovac – Rijeka – Split – Dubrovnik – Petrovac – Podgorica – Bijelo Polje – Pristina – Skopje – Kičevo – Ohrid – Bitola – Niki – Vevi – Kozani – Larissa – Domokos – Lamia – Bralos – Itea – Antirrio – Rhion – Aigio – Corinth – Tripoli – Kalamata ... Kissamos – Chania
- – 4,340 km (2,700 mi): Vardø – Vadsø – Varangerbotn – Utsjoki – Inari – Ivalo – Sodankylä – Rovaniemi – Kemi – Oulu – Jyväskylä – Heinola – Lahti – Helsinki ... Gdańsk – Grudziądz – Torun – Łódź – Piotrków – Częstochowa – Katowice – Tychy – Bielsko-Biała – Čadca – Žilina – Trenčin – Bratislava – Győr – Tata – Budapest – Kecskemét – Szeged – Subotica – Novi Sad – Belgrade – Niš – Vranje – Kumanovo – Skopje – Veles – Gevgelija – Evzoni – Thessaloniki – Katerini – Larissa – Lamia – Athens ... Chania – Heraklion – Agios Nikolaos – Sitia
- – 2,300 km (1,400 mi): Klaipėda – Raseiniai – Kaunas – Elekrėnai – Vilnius – Lida – Slonim – Kobryn – Kovel – Lutsk – Dubno – Ternopil – Chernivtsi – Siret – Suceava – Fălticeni – Roman – Bacău – Focșani – Buzău – Urziceni – Bucharest – Giurgiu – Ruse – Byala – Veliko Tarnovo – Gabrovo – Kazanluk – Stara Zagora – Dimitrovgard – Haskovo – Svilengrad – Ormenio – Kastanies – Didymoteicho – Alexandroupoli
- – 1,790 km (1,110 mi): Saint Petersburg – Gatchina – Luga – Pskov – Ostrov – Opochka – Nevel – Vitebsk – Orsha – Mahilyow – Dovsk – Homiel – Chernihiv – Brovary – Kyiv – Vasylkiv – Bila Tservka – Uman – Liubashivka– Odesa ... Samsun – Kavak – Havza – Suluova – Merzifon
- – 850 km (530 mi): Moscow – Kaluga – Bryansk – Hlukhiv – Kyiv
- – 3,770 km (2,340 mi): Kirkenes – Zapolyarny – Murmansk – Kola – Olenegorsk – Kandalaksha – Segezha – Medvezhyegorsk – Kondopoga – Petrozavodsk – Lodeynoye – Kirovsk – Saint Petersburg – Veliky – Torzhok – Tver – Klin – Zelenograd – Khimki – Moscow – Podolsk – Serpulkov – Tula – Orel – Kursk – Belgorod – Kharkiv – Dnipro – Zaporizhzhia – Melitopol – Dzhankoi – Simferopol – Alushta – Yalta
- – 1,730 km (1,070 mi): Yaroslavl – Rostov Veliky – Sergiyev Posad – Mytishchi – Moscow – Domodevo – Stupino – Novomoskovsk – Yefremov – Yelets – Voronezh – Kashirskoe – Pavlosk – Kamesk – Shakhty – Novocherkassk – Rostov – Pavlovskaya – Krasnodar – Krymsk – Tsemdolina – Novorossiysk
- – 1,050 km (650 mi): Mineralnye Vody – Pyatigorsk – Nalchik – Beslan – Vladikavkaz – Stepantsminda – Mtskheta – Tbilisi – Marneuli – Bolnisi – Spitak – Yerevan – Goris – Megri
- – 2,630 km (1,630 mi): Moscow – Domodevo – Stupino – Mikhaylov – Michurinsk – Tambov – Borisoglebsk – Povorino – Mikhaylovka – Volgograd – Astrakhan – Liman – Kizlyar – Makhachkala – Derbent – Samur – Quba – Sumqayit– Baku – Alyat – Salyan – Masalli – Lankuran – Astara
- – 2,700 km (1,700 mi): Samara – Oral – Atyrau – Beineu – Shetpe – Zhetybai – Fetisovo – Bekdash – Türkmenbaşy – Gyzylarbat – Border of the Islamic Republic of Iran
- – 2,840 km (1,760 mi): Chelyabinsk – Kostanay – Esil – Derzhavinsk – Arkalyk – Jezkazgan – Kyzylorda – Shymkent – Tashkent – Ayni – Dushanbe – Panji Poyon
- – 2,600 km (1,600 mi): Ishim – Petropavl – Kokshetau – Astana – Karaganda – Balkhash – Burubaytal – Almaty – Bishkek – Naryn – Torugart Pass
- – 1,330 km (830 mi): Omsk – Pavlodar – Semey – Georgiyevka – Qonayev

==== West–East reference ====
- – 880 km (550 mi): Å – Svolvær – Lødingen – Bogen – Narvik – Kiruna – Töre – Luleå
- – 1,880 km (1,170 mi): Shannon – Limerick – Dublin ... Liverpool – Manchester – Leeds – Kingston upon Hull ... Esbjerg – Copenhagen – Malmö – Helsingborg – Halmstad – Gothenburg – Skara – Örebro – Stockholm ... Tallinn – Narva – Saint Petersburg
- – 6,050 km (3,760 mi): Cork – Dungarvan – Waterford – Wexford – Rosslare ... Fishguard – Haverfordwest – Carmarthen – Swansea – Bridgend – Cardiff – Newport – Bristol – Swindon – Reading – Slough – London – Romford – Chelmsford – Colchester – Ipswich – Felixstowe ... Hook of Holland – The Hague – Zoetermeer – Gouda – Utrecht – Amersfoort – Barneveld – Apeldoorn – Deventer – Hengelo – Rheine – Osnabrück – Bad Oeynhausen – Hanover – Braunschweig – Magdeburg – Brandenburg – Potsdam – Berlin – Świebodzin – Poznań – Września – Konin – Lodz – Łowicz – Warsaw – Siedlce – Terespol – Brest –Baranavichy – Minsk – Barysaw – Orsha – Smolensk – Vyazma – Moscow – Lyubertsky – Kolomna – Ryazan – Shatsk – Penza – Kuznetsk – Syzran – Tolyatti – Samara – Oktyabrsky – Ufa – Sim – Miass – Chelyabinsk – Kurgan – Ishim – Omsk
- – 8,690 km (5,400 mi): Calais – Dunkirk – Jabbeke – Bruges – Ghent – Aalst – Brussels – Leuven – Liège – Eupen – Aachen – Düren – Cologne – Bergischgladbach – Gummersbach – Olpe – Siegen – Dillenburg – Wetzlar – Gießen – Alsdorf – Bad Hersfeld – Eisenach – Gotha – Erfurt – Weimar – Jena – Gera – Chemnitz – Dresden – Bautzen – Görlitz – Zgorzelec – Bolesławiec – Legnica – Wrocław – Opole – Gliwice – Zabrze – Katowice – Mysłowice – Kraków – Bochnia – Tarnów – Dębica – Rzeszów – Jarosław – Korczowa – Lviv – Brody – Dubno – Rivne – Zviahel – Zhytomyr – Kyiv – Boryspil – Lubny – Poltava – Valky – Kharkiv – Izyum – Slovyansk – Bakhmut – Alchevsk – Luhansk – Donetsk – Kamensk – Morozovsk – Volgograd – Astrakhan – Atyrau – Dossor – Kulsary – Beyneu – Qo‘ng‘irot – Nukus – Daşoguz – Urgench – Bukhara – Navoiy – Kattakurgan – Samarkand – Jizzakh – Gulistan – Yangiyul – Tashkent – Shymkent – Zhambyl – Bishkek – Almaty – Qonayev – Sary-Ozek – Taldykorgan – Ucharal – Taskesken – Ayagoz – Georgiyevka – Oskemen – Ridder
- – 5,100 km (3,200 mi): Brest – Morlaix – Guingamp – Rennes – Vitré – Laval – Le Mans – Chartres – Paris – Chessy – Reims – Châlons – Verdun – Metz – Forbach – Saarbrücken – Sankt Ingbert – Kaiserslautern – Frankenthal – Mannheim – Heidelberg – Sinsheim – Heilbronn – Crailsheim – Ansbach – Schwabach – Nuremberg – Amberg – Rozvadov – Plzeň – Prague – Řičany – Humpolec – Jihlava – Brno – Uherské Hradiště – Trenčín – Žilina – Ružomberok – Poprad – Prešov – Košice – Michalovice – Vyšné Nemecké – Uzhhorod – Mukachevo – Stryj – Rohatyn – Ternopil – Volochysk – Khmelnytskyi – Vinnytsia – Nemyriv – Haisyn – Uman – Kropyvnytskyi – Oleksandriya – Kamianske – Dnipro – Samar – Pavlohrad – Pokrovsk – Donetsk – Horlivka – Khrustalnyi – Shakhty – Rostov-on-Don – Tikhoretsk – Kropotkin – Armavir – Nevinnomyssk – Mineralnye Vody – Pyatigorsk – Nalchik – Nazran – Grozny – Khasavyurt – Makhachkala
- – 8,200 km (5,100 mi): Brest – Quimper – Concarneau – Quimperlé – Lorient – Vannes – La Roche Bernard – Savenay – Nantes – Ancenis – Angers – Saumur – Tours – Blois – Orléans – Montargis – Auxerre – Avallon – Beaune – Dole – Besançon – Montbéliard – Belfort – Mulhouse – Basel – Brugg – Baden – Zürich – Winterthur – Frauenfeld – Wil– St. Gallen – St. Margrethen – Bregenz – Lauterach – Dornbirn – Feldkirch – Bludenz – Landeck – Imst – Telfs – Innsbruck – Wörgl – Rosenheim – Bad Reichenhall – Salzburg – Gmunden – Sattledt – Linz – Amstetten – Melk – Sankt Pölten – Vienna – Nickelsdorf – Mosonmagyaróvár – Győr – Tata – Tatabanya – Budapest – Cegléd – Szolnok – Püspökladány – Oradea – Huedin – Cluj-Napoca – Turda – Târgu Mureş – Sighișoara – Hoghiz – Braşov – Săcele – Sinaia – Câmpina – Ploieşti – Bucharest – Urziceni – Slobozia – Hârşova – Constanţa – Agigea ... Poti – Senaki – Samtredia – Kutaisi – Khashuri – Gori – Tbilisi – Rustavi – Səmkir – Ganja – Yevlakh – Baku ... Türkmenbaşy – Balkanabat – Bereket – Serdar – Ashgabat – Tejen – Mary – Bayramaly– Türkmenabat – Alat – Bukhara – Karshi – G‘uzor – Sherobod – Termez – Denau – Dushanbe – Jirgatal – Sary Tash – Irkeshtam – China
- – 4,550 km (2,830 mi): A Coruña – Betanzos – Vilalba – Ribadeo – Aviles – Gijón – Llanes – Torrelavega – Santander – Bilbao – Amorebieta – Elgoibar – San Sebastián – Irun – Biarritz – Anglet – Bayonne – Bordeaux – Libourne – Périgueux – Brive – Tulle – Riom – Clermont – Thiers – Tarare – Lyon – Saint‐Priest – Bourgoin-Jallieu – Chambéry – Modane – Bardonecchia – Oulx – Susa – Rivoli – Turin – Chieri – Asti – Alessandria – Tortona – Voghera – Piacenza – Cremona – Brescia – Desenzano – Verona – Vicenza – Padova – Mestre – Portoguaro – Palmanova – Monfalcone – Trieste – Postojna – Logatec – Ljubljana – Trebnje – Krško – Samobor – Zagreb – Kutina – Nova Gradiška – Slavonski Brod – Lipovac – Ruma – Belgrade – Pančevo – Vršac – Timișoara – Lugoj – Caransebeș – Drobeta-Turnu Severin – Filiași – Craiova – Caracal – Alexandria – Bucharest – Giurgiu – Ruse – Razgrad – Shumen – Novi Pazar – Varna ... Samsun – Tekkeköy – Çarşamba – Ünye – Fatsa – Ordu – Giresun – Tirebolu – Trabzon – Rize – Hopa – Batumi – Poti
- – 5,600 km (3,500 mi): Lisbon – Alverca – Santarem – Entroncamento – Castel Branco – Guarda – Vilar Formoso – Salamanca – Tordesillas – Valladolid – Palencia – Burgos – Briviesca – Miranda – Vitoria – Arrasate – San Sebastián – Irun – Biarritz – Anglet – Bayonne – Orthez – Pau – Tarbes – Muret – Toulouse – Castelnaudary – Carcassonne – Narbonne – Béziers – Montpellier – Lunel – Nîmes – Arles – Salon – Aix – Brignoles – Fréjus – Cannes – Antibes – Nice – Monaco – Menton – Ventimiglia – Sanremo – Imperia – Albenga – Savona – Genoa – Rapallo – Lavagna – La Spezia – Carrara – Massa – Viareggio – Pisa – Livorno – Cecina – Follonica – Grosseto – Tarquinia – Civitavecchia – Rome – Tivoli – Avezzano – Sulmona – Chieti – Pescara ... Ragusa – Cattaro – Budva – Podgorica – Kolasin – Bijelo Pole – Mitrovica – Pristina – Podujevë – Prokuplje – Niš – Pirot – Sofia – Pazardzhik – Plovdiv – Parvomay – Haskovo – Svilengrad – Edirne – Lüleburgaz – Çorlu – Silivri – Istanbul – Sultanbeyli – Gebze – Derince – İzmit – Kartepe – Adapazari – Hendek – Düzce – Bolu – Gerede – Çerkeş – Tosya – Merzifon – Suluova – Amasya – Erbaa – Niksar – Koyulsihar – Refahiye – Erzincan – Erzurum – Horasan – Ağri – Doğubeyazit – Gürbulak – Border of the Islamic Republic of Iran
- – 4,770 km (2,960 mi): Lisbon – Almada – Barreiro – Setúbal – Evora – Estremoz – Elvas – Badajoz – Merida – Talavera de la Reina – Móstoles – Alcorcón – Madrid – Torrejón de Ardoz – Guadalajara – Calatayud – Zaragoza – Lérida – Montblanc – Vilafranca – Martorell – Llobregat – Barcelona ... Mazara del Vallo – Castelvetrano – Alcamo – Partinico – Palermo – Bagheria – Cefalu – Capo d'Orlando – Milazzo – Messina ... Reggio Calabria – Bova – Bovalino – Siderno – Soverato – Catanzaro – Crotone – Corigliano – Policoro – Taranto – Mesagne – Brindisi ... Igoumenitsa – Ioannina – Grevena – Kozani – Veria – Thessaloniki – Asprovalta – Kavala – Xanthi – Komotini – Alexandroupoli – Keşan – Gelibolu ... Lapseki – Biga – Bandirma – Karacabey – Bursa – Inegöl – Bozüyük – Eskișehir – Sivrihishar – Polatli – Ankara – Gölbaşi – Kula – Aksaray – Ereğli – Tarsus – Adana – Ceyhan – Osmaniye – Gaziantep – Nizip – Şanliurfa – Viranşehir – Kiziltepe – Nusaybin – Cizre – Silopi – Border of the Republic of Iraq

==== North–South intermediate ====
- – 1,460 km (910 mi): Larne – Belfast – Newry – Dublin – Wicklow – Rosslare ... A Coruña – Pontevedra – Vigo – Valença – Porto – Lisbon – Albufeira – Castro Marim – Huelva – Seville
- – 470 km (290 mi): Cherbourg-Octeville – La Rochelle
- The E4 and E6 run north–south, but are listed as west–east routes
- – 250 km (160 mi): Pau, Pyrénées-Atlantiques – Jaca – Zaragoza
- – 967 km (601 mi): Orléans – Toulouse – Barcelona
- – 540 km (340 mi): Vierzon – Montluçon – Clermont-Ferrand – Montpellier
- – 230 km (140 mi): Leeds – Doncaster – Sheffield – Nottingham – Leicester – Northampton – London
- – 670 km (420 mi): Antwerp – Beaune
- – 520 km (320 mi): Amsterdam – Brussels – Paris
- – 540 km (340 mi): Metz – Geneva
- – 390 km (240 mi): Metz – Lausanne
- – 350 km (220 mi): Belfort – Bern – Martigny – Aosta
- – 290 km (180 mi): Cologne – Sarreguemines – E25 (towards Strasbourg)
- – 520 km (320 mi) – Rotterdam – Ludwigshafen
- – 100 km (62 mi): Parma – La Spezia
- – 290 km (180 mi): Bremen – Münster – Dortmund – Wuppetal – Cologne
- – 1,330 km (830 mi): Trondheim – Orkanger – Vinjeøra – Halsa ... Straumsnes – Kristiansund Mainland Connection – Batnfjordsøra – Molde ... Vestnes – Sjøholt – Ålesund ... Volda – Grodås - Nordfjordeid ... Sandane – Førde – Lavik ... Instefjord – Knarvik – Bergen – Osøyro ... Leirvik – Førde – Aksdal – Føresvik ... Vikevåg – Grødem – Stavanger – Sandnes – Ålgård - Helleland – Flekkefjord – Lyngdal – Mandal – Kristiansand ... Hirtshals – Hjørring – Nørresundby – Aalborg
- – 760 km (470 mi): Dortmund – Wetzlar – Aschaffenburg – Würzburg – Stuttgart – Schaffhausen – Winterthur – Zürich – Altdorf
- – 510 km (320 mi): Würzburg – Ulm – Lindau – Bregenz – St. Margrethen – Buchs – Chur – San Bernardino – Bellinzona
- – 290 km (180 mi): Helsingborg ... Helsingør – Copenhagen – Køge – Vordingborg – Farø – Rødby ... Puttgarden – Oldenburg in Holstein – Lübeck (Most of the E6 route in Norway and Sweden was meant to be part of this route, but kept its old number)
- – 740 km (460 mi): Magdeburg – Halle – Plauen – Schönberg – Vojtanov – Cheb – Karlovy Vary – Plzeň – České Budějovice – Halámky – Vienna
- – 410 km (250 mi): Berlin – Leipzig – Gera – Hirschberg – Hof – Bayreuth – Nuremberg
- – 270 km (170 mi): Plzeň – Bayerisch Eisenstein – Deggendorf – Munich
- – 380 km (240 mi): Sattledt – Liezen – Sankt Michael – Graz – Maribor – Ljubljana
- – 660 km (410 mi): Prague – Jihlava – Vienna – Graz – Spielfeld – Maribor – Zagreb
- – 240 km (150 mi): Villach – Karawanks Tunnel – Naklo – Ljubljana – Trieste – Rijeka
- – 1,110 km (690 mi): Sodankylä – Kemijärvi – Posio – Kuusamo – Kajaani – Iisalmi – Kuopio – Jyväskylä – Tampere – Turku
- – 1,630 km (1,010 mi): Helsinki ... Tallinn – Riga – Kaunas – Suwałki – Warsaw – Piotrków Trybunalski – Wrocław – Kłodzko – Kudowa-Zdrój – Náchod – Hradec Králové – Prague; also known as the Via Baltica
- – 130 km (81 mi): Nordkapp (North Cape) – Olderfjord
- – 970 km (600 mi): Košice – Miskolc – Budapest – Balatonvilágos – Nagykanizsa – Zagreb – Karlovac – Knin – Split
- – 679 km (422 mi): Budapest – Szekszárd – Mohács – Osijek – Odžak – Zenica – Sarajevo – Mostar – Metković
- – 1,690 km (1,050 mi): Pskov – Riga – Šiauliai – Tolpaki – Kaliningrad ... Gdańsk – Elbląg – Warsaw – Radom – Kraków – Trstená – Ružomberok – Zvolen – Budapest
- – 1,160 km (720 mi): Miskolc – Debrecen – Berettyóújfalu – Oradea – Beiuș – Deva – Petroșani – Târgu Jiu – Craiova – Calafat – Vidin – Vraca – Botevgrad – Sofia – Blagoevgrad – Serres – Thessaloniki
- – 990 km (620 mi): Mukachevo – Halmeu – Satu Mare – Zalău – Cluj-Napoca – Turda – Sebeș – Sibiu – Pitești – Bucharest – Constanţa
- – 250 km (160 mi): Byala – Pleven – Jablanica – Botevgrad – Sofia
- – 2,030 km (1,260 mi): Odesa – Izmail – Reni – Galaţi – Tulcea – Constanţa – Varna – Burgas – Malko Tarnovo – Dereköy – Kırklareli – Babaeski – Havsa – Keşan – Gelibolu – Ayvalık – İzmir – Selçuk – Aydın – Denizli – Acıpayam – Korkuteli – Antalya
- – 130 km (81 mi): Gerede – Kızılcahamam – Ankara
- – 170 km (110 mi): Toprakkale – İskenderun – Antakya – Yayladağı – Syria
- – 1,150 km (710 mi): Kherson – Dzhankoy – Novorossiysk – Sochi – Sokhumi – Zugdidi – Senaki
- – 750 km (470 mi): Şanlıurfa – Diyarbakır – Bitlis – Doğubayazıt – Iğdır – Dilucu – Sadarak

==== West–East intermediate ====
- – 1,590 km (990 mi): Helsingborg – Jönköping – Linköping – Norrköping – Nyköping – Södertälje – Stockholm – Uppsala – Sundsvall – Örnsköldsvik – Umeå – Luleå – Haparanda – Tornio (runs north–south, but listed as west–east. Was to be numbered as part of E55, but kept old number)
- – 3,120 km (1,940 mi): Trelleborg – Malmö – Helsingborg – Halmstad – Gothenburg – Oslo – Hamar – Lillehammer – Dombås – Trondheim – Stjørdalshalsen – Steinkjer – Mosjøen – Mo i Rana – Rognan – Fauske – Bognes ... Narvik – Setermoen – Alta – Olderfjord – Lakselv – Karasjok – Varangerbotn – Kirkenes (runs mostly north–south, but listed as west–east. Helsingborg - Alta was to be part of the E47, but kept old number)
- – 1,410 km (880 mi): Tromsø – Nordkjosbotn – Skibotn – Kilpisjärvi – Kolari – Tornio – Kemi – Oulu – Kokkola – Vaasa – Pori – Turku
- – 910 km (570 mi): Mo i Rana – Umeå ... Vaasa – Tampere – Hämeenlinna – Helsinki
- – 449 km (279 mi): Trondheim – Östersund – Sundsvall
- – 710 km (440 mi): Derry – Magherafelt – Antrim – Belfast ... Glasgow – Edinburgh ... Bergen – Indre Arna – Vossevangen – Lærdalsøyri – Tyin – Fagernes – Hønefoss – Sandvika – Oslo – Gardermoen – Kongsvinger – Torsby – Malung – Borlänge – Falun – Sandviken – Gävle
- – 1,890 km (1,170 mi): Craigavon – Lisburn – Belfast – Larne ... Stranraer – Castle Douglas – Dumfries – Gretna – Carlisle – Hexham – Newcastle ... Kristiansand – Arendal – Porsgrunn – Larvik – Sandefjord – Tønsberg – Horten – Drammen – Asker – Oslo – Ski – Askim – Karlstad – Örebro – Västerås – Stockholm/Kapellskär ... Mariehamn ... Turku/Naantali – Salo – Lohja – Espoo – Helsinki – Porvoo – Kotka – Vaalimaa – Vyborg – Saint Petersburg
- – 5,320 km (3,310 mi): Holyhead – Bangor – Llandudno – Buckley – Chester – Runcorn – Warrington – Manchester – Rochdale – Huddersfield – Leeds – Pontefract – Doncaster – Grimsby – Immingham ... Amsterdam – Almere – Drachten – Groningen – Leer – Oldenburg – Bremen – Hamburg – Lübeck – Wismar – Rostock – Stralsund – Sassnitz ... Trelleborg – Malmö – Lund – Kristianstad – Karlskrona – Kalmar – Gamleby – Norrköping ... Ventspils – Talsi – Jürmala – Riga – Ogre – Rēzekne – Terechova – Pustoshka – Velikiye Luki – Rzhev – Krasnogorsk – Moscow – Balashikha – Elektrostal – Petushki – Vladimir – Kovrov – Dzerzhinsk – Nizhny Novgorod – Kstovo – Cheboksary – Kazan – Baltasi – Igra – Krasnokamsk – Perm – Kungur – Pervouralsk – Yekaterinburg – Tyumen – Ishim
- – 230 km (140 mi): Birmingham – Coventry – Rugby – Kettering – Huntingdon – Cambridge – Newmarket – Ipswich
- – 280 km (170 mi): Hamburg – Berlin
- – 1,230 km (760 mi): Berlin – Eberswalde – Szczecin – Goleniów – Gryfice – Kołobrzeg – Koszalin – Słupsk – Lębork – Gdynia – Gdańsk – Elbląg – Kaliningrad – Tolpaki – Nesterov – Vilkaviškis – Marijampolė – Vilnius – Ashmyany – Minsk
- – 30 km (19 mi): Colchester – Harwich
- – 470 km (290 mi): Zeebrugge – Ghent – Antwerp – Turnhout – Eindhoven – Helmond – Venlo – Kempen – Moers – Duisburg – Oberhausen – Essen – Bochum – Dortmund – Hamm – Gütersloh – Bielefeld – Bad Oeynhausen
- – 220 km (140 mi): Berlin – Lübbenau – Cottbus – Legnica
- – 3,400 km (2,100 mi): Hlukhiv – Kursk – Voronezh – Saratov – Oral – Aktobe – Karabulak – Aral – Novokazalinsk – Kyzylorda – Shymkent
- – 620 km (390 mi): Dunkirk – Armentières – Lille – Tournai – Mons – La Louvière – Charleroi – Namur – Liège – St. Vith – Wittlich – Bingen – Mainz – Wiesbaden – Frankfurt am Main – Offenbach – Aschaffenburg
- – 780 km (480 mi): Le Havre – Amiens – Saint-Quentin – Charleville-Mézières – Sedan – Longwy – Luxembourg – Trier – Wittlich – Koblenz – Montabaur – Limburg – Wetzlar – Gießen
- – 720 km (450 mi): Cherbourg-Octeville – Caen – Rouen – Reims – Charleville-Mézières – Liège
- – 350 km (220 mi): Schweinfurt – Bayreuth – Marktredwitz – Cheb – Karlovy Vary – Prague
- – 520 km (320 mi): Strasbourg – Appenweier – Baden-Baden – Rastatt – Karlsruhe – Pforzheim – Stuttgart – Kirchheim – Ulm – Augsburg – Munich – Rosenheim – Salzburg
- – 860 km (530 mi): Paris – Melun – Troyes – Chaumont – Langres – Vesoul – Belfort – Mulhouse – Basel – Waldshut – Schaffhausen – Singen – Friedrichshafen – Lindau – Wangen – Memmingen – Landsberg – Munich
- – 310 km (190 mi): Nuremberg – Regensburg – Passau – Wels – Sattledt
- – 2,200 km (1,400 mi): Vienna – Bratislava – Zvolen – Košice – Uzhhorod – Mukachevo – Baia Mare – Dej – Bistrița – Suceava – Iași – Sculeni – Chişinău – Odesa – Mykolaiv – Kherson – Melitopol – Taganrog – Rostov-on-Don
- – 1,290 km (800 mi): Nantes – Poitiers – Mâcon – Geneva – Lausanne – Martigny – Sion – Simplon – Gravellona Toce – Milan – Tortona – Genoa
- – 240 km (150 mi): Turin – Milan – Brescia
- – 650 km (400 mi): Fortezza – Innichen – Spittal an der Drau – Villach – Klagenfurt – Graz – Veszprém – Székesfehérvár
- – 510 km (320 mi): Szeged – Arad – Deva – Sibiu – Braşov
- – 250 km (160 mi): Bordeaux – Toulouse
- – 240 km (150 mi): Nice – Cuneo – Asti – Alessandria
- – 80 km (50 mi): Pisa – Migliarino – Florence
- – 270 km (170 mi): Grosseto – Arezzo – Sansepolcro – Fano
- – 380 km (240 mi): Porto – Vila Real – Bragança – Zamora – Tordesillas
- – 150 km (93 mi): Keşan – Tekirdağ – Silivri
- – 200 km (120 mi): Krystallopigi – Florina – Vévi – Géfira
- – 640 km (400 mi): Ankara – Yozgat – Sivas – Refahiye
- – 320 km (200 mi)): Igoumenitsa – Ioannina – Trikala – Larissa – Volos
- – 110 km (68 mi): Corinth – Megara – Attiki Odos (Elefsina – Athens Suburbs – Markopoulo Mesogeas).
- – 440 km (270 mi): İzmir – Usak – Afyonkarahisar – Sivrihisar
- – 60 km (37 mi): Topboğazi – Kırıkhan – Reyhanlı – Cilvegözü → Syria

=== B Class roads ===
- – 460 km (290 mi): Haugesund – Røldal – Haukeli – Seljord – Kongsberg – Drammen – Drøbak - Vassum
- – 176 km (109 mi): Ålesund – Tresfjord – Åndalsnes – Dombås
- – 170 km (110 mi): Cork – Portlaoise
- – 40 km (25 mi): Amsterdam – Amersfoort
- – 172 km (107 mi): Amersfoort – Hoogeveen – Groningen
- – 132 km (82 mi): Hoogeveen – Haselünne – Cloppenburg
- – 162 km (101 mi): Cuxhaven – Bremerhaven – Bremen – Walsrode
- – 281 km (175 mi): Sassnitz – Stralsund – Neubrandenburg – Berlin
- – 350 km (220 mi): Świecie – Poznań – Wrocław
- – 417 km (259 mi): Kaunas – Ukmergė – Daugavpils – Rēzekne – Ostrov
- – 280 km (170 mi): Tallinn – Tartu – Võru – Luhamaa
- – 340 km (210 mi): Jõhvi – Tartu – Valga – Valka – Valmiera – Incukalns
- – 60 km (37 mi): Tallinn – Keila – Paldiski ... Kapellskär
- – 296 km (184 mi): Minsk – Babruysk – Gomel (formerly began Klaipėda – Kaunas – Vilnius)
- – 380 km (240 mi): Klaipėda – Palanga – Šiauliai – Panevėžys – Ukmergė – Vilnius
- – 67 km (42 mi): Breda – Gorinchem – Utrecht
- – 160 km (99 mi): Flushing – Breda – Eindhoven
- – 112 km (70 mi): Antwerp – Liège
- – 125 km (78 mi): Leuven – Hasselt – Heerlen – Aachen
- – 150 km (93 mi): Dortmund – Kassel
- – 358 km (222 mi): Radom – Rzeszów – Barwinek – Vyšný Komárnik – Svidník – Prešov
- – 367 km (228 mi): Warsaw – Lublin – Lviv
- – 590 km (370 mi): Lublin – Kovel – Rivne – Kyiv
- – 160 km (99 mi): Trosna – Hlukhiv
- – 200 km (120 mi): Saint-Brieuc – Caen
- – 425 km (264 mi): Calais – Rouen – Le Mans
- – 96 km (60 mi): Zeebrugge – Bruges – Roeselare – Kortrijk – Tournai
- – 0 km (0 mi): Jabbeke – Zeebrugge (road never built)
- – 270 km (170 mi): Brussels – Metz
- – 187 km (116 mi): Nivelles – Charleroi – Reims
- – 153 km (95 mi): Eynatten – Eupen – St. Vith – Luxembourg
- – 82 km (51 mi): Trier – Saarbrücken
- – 65 km (40 mi): Tournai – Halle
- – 110 km (68 mi): Chemnitz – Plauen – Hof (E51)
- – 568 km (353 mi): Karlovy Vary – Teplice – Turnov – Hradec Králové – Olomouc – Žilina
- – 125 km (78 mi): Gießen – Frankfurt am Main – Mannheim
- – 190 km (120 mi): Svitavy – Brno – Vienna
- – 310 km (190 mi): Brno – Olomouc – Český Těšín – Katowice – Kraków
- – 210 km (130 mi): Mukachevo – Lviv
- – 90 km (56 mi): Le Mans – Angers
- – 90 km (56 mi): Le Mans – Tours
- – 100 km (62 mi): Courtenay – Troyes
- – 80 km (50 mi): Remiremont – Mulhouse
- – 95 km (59 mi): Offenburg – Donaueschingen
- – 70 km (43 mi): Memmingen – Füssen
- – 125 km (78 mi): Munich – Garmisch-Partenkirchen – Mittenwald – Seefeld – Innsbruck
- – 110 km (68 mi): České Budějovice – Humpolec
- – 230 km (140 mi): Munich – Braunau am Inn – Wels – Linz
- – 403 km (250 mi): Bratislava – Zvolen – Košice
- – 101 km (63 mi): Trenčín – Žiar nad Hronom
- – 193 km (120 mi): Püspökladány – Nyíregyháza – Chop – Uzhhorod
- – 416 km (258 mi): Bacău – Brașov – Pitești – Craiova
- – 95 km (59 mi): Bratislava – Dunajská Streda – Medveďov – Vámosszabadi – Győr
- – 58 km (36 mi): Cluj-Napoca – Dej (formerly continued Bistriţa – Suceava)
- – 75 km (47 mi): Ploieşti – Buzău
- – 228 km (142 mi): Sărățel – Reghin – Toplița – Gheorgheni – Miercurea-Ciuc – Sfântu Gheorghe – Chichiș
- – 100 km (62 mi): Görbeháza – Nyíregyháza – Vásárosnamény – Beregdaróc
- – 441 km (274 mi): Tișița – Tecuci – Albița – Leușeni – Chișinău – Odesa
- – 628 km (390 mi): Săbăoani – Iași – Bălți – Mohyliv-Podilskyi – Vinnytsia – Zhytomyr
- – 938 km (583 mi): Poltava – Kropyvnytskyi – Chişinău – Giurgiuleşti – Galaţi – Slobozia
- – 415 km (258 mi): Novorossiysk – junction south of Rostov-on-Don (Note: Still in the list despite entirely dublicating south part of E115.)
- – 113 km (70 mi): Krasnodar – Dzhubga
- – 61 km (38 mi): Niort – La Rochelle
- – 195 km (121 mi): La Rochelle – Saintes
- – 172 km (107 mi): Saintes – Angoulême – Limoges (formerly to Sculeni)
- – 128 km (80 mi): Tours – Vierzon
- – 120 km (75 mi): Angoulême – Bordeaux
- – 88 km (55 mi): Digoin – Chalon-sur-Saône
- – 58 km (36 mi): Lyon – Pont-d'Ain
- – 54 km (34 mi): Ivrea – Turin
- – 106 km (66 mi): Wörgl – St. Johann in Tirol – Lofer – Salzburg
- – 73 km (45 mi): Altenmarkt im Pongau – Liezen
- – 52 km (32 mi): Klagenfurt – Loiblpass – Naklo
- – 107 km (66 mi): Letenye – Tornyiszentmiklós
- – 447 km (278 mi): Balatonkeresztúr – Nagyatád – Barcs – Virovitica – Okučani – Banja Luka – Jajce – Donji Vakuf – Zenica
- – 121 km (75 mi): Subotica – Sombor – Osijek
- – 322 km (200 mi): Timișoara – Arad – Oradea – Satu Mare
- – 103 km (64 mi): Lugoj – Ilia
- – 59 km (37 mi): Agigea – Negru Vodă – Kardam
- – 460 km (290 mi): Ashtarak – Gyumri – Ashotsk – Akhalkalaki – Akhaltsikhe – Vale, Georgia – Türkgözü – Posof – Kars – Horasan
- – 113 km (70 mi): Supsa – Lanchkhuti – Samtredia
- – 111 km (69 mi): Lyon – Grenoble
- – 452 km (281 mi): Geneva – Chambéry – Marseille
- – 92 km (57 mi): Valence – Grenoble
- – 117 km (73 mi): Orange – Marseille
- – 141 km (88 mi): Turin – Savona
- – 160 km (99 mi): Rijeka – Pula – Koper
- – 742 km (461 mi): Bihać – Jajce – Donji Vakuf – Zenica – Sarajevo – Užice – Čačak – Kraljevo – Kruševac – Pojate – Paraćin – Zaječar
- – 328 km (204 mi): Sarajevo – Podgorica → Albania
- – 348 km (216 mi): Belgrade – Čačak – Nova Varoš – Bijelo Polje
- – 225 km (140 mi): Drobeta-Turnu Severin – Niš
- – 258 km (160 mi): Yablanitsa – Veliko Tarnovo – Shumen
- – 273 km (170 mi): Popovica – Stara Zagora – Burgas
- – 262 km (163 mi): Coimbra – Viseu – Vila Real – Chaves – Verín
- – 599 km (372 mi): Bragança – Guarda – Castelo Branco – Portalegre – Évora – Beja – Ourique
- – 463 km (288 mi): Salamanca – Mérida – Seville
- – 292 km (181 mi): Bilbao – Logroño – Zaragoza
- – 124 km (77 mi): Vila Nova de Famalicão – Chaves
- – 209 km (130 mi): Torres Novas – Abrantes – Castelo Branco – Guarda
- – 36 km (22 mi): Rome – San Cesareo
- – 105 km (65 mi): Sassari – Olbia ... Civitavecchia – ends at E80
- – 38 km (24 mi): Avellino – Salerno
- – 257 km (160 mi): Naples – Avellino – Benevento – Canosa di Puglia
- – 96 km (60 mi): Bari – Taranto
- – 24 km (15 mi): Spezzano Albanese – Sybaris
- – 112 km (70 mi): Cosenza – Crotone
- – 159 km (99 mi): Sicignano degli Alburni – Potenza – Metaponto
- – 38 km (24 mi): Sant'Eufemia Lamezia – Catanzaro
- – 323 km (201 mi): Petrovac → Albania → Prizren – Pristina
- – 29 km (18 mi): Ohrid → Albania
- – 61 km (38 mi): Ioannina → Albania
- – 194 km (121 mi): Sofia – Kyustendil – Kumanovo
- – 550 km (340 mi): İzmit – Bursa – Balıkesir – Manisa – İzmir – Çeşme
- – 352 km (219 mi): Madrid – Valencia
- – 280 km (170 mi): Jaén – Granada – Málaga
- – 631 km (392 mi): Mérida – Ciudad Real – Albacete – Alicante
- – 187 km (116 mi): Mazara del Vallo – Gela
- – 161 km (100 mi): Buonfornello – Enna – Catania
- – 50 km (31 mi): Alcamo – Trapani
- – 193 km (120 mi): Ioannina – Arta – Agrinio – Missolonghi
- – 247 km (153 mi): Aktio – Vonitsa – Amfilochia – Karpenisi – Lamia
- – 101 km (63 mi): Tripoli – Sparti – Gytheio
- – 51 km (32 mi): Eleusina – Thebes
- – 403 km (250 mi): Afyon – Konya – Junction (Aksaray-Pozantı) (on the State road linking Ankara and Mersin on E90)
- – 66 km (41 mi): Mersin – Junction Tarsus East (on the motorway linking Ankara and Adana on E90)
- – 117 km (73 mi): Tbilisi – Marneuli – Sadakhlo – Bagratashen – Vanadzor
- – 481 km (299 mi): Alyat – Saatly Rayon – Megri – Ordubad – Julfa – Nakhchivan – Sadarak
- – 1,120 km (700 mi): Uchkuduk – Daşoguz – Ashgabat – Gaudan
- – 700 km (430 mi): Kyzylorda – Uchkuduk – Bukhara (NB: most of road not built)
- – 154 km (96 mi): G‘uzor – Samarkand
- – 298 km (185 mi): Ayni – Kokand
- – 590 km (370 mi): Tashkent – Kokand – Andijan – Osh – Irkeshtam
- – 970 km (600 mi): Dushanbe – Kulob – Kalaikhumb – Khorugh – Murghab – Kulma Pass – border of China (see Pamir Highway)
- – 666 km (414 mi): Jirgatal – Khorugh – Ishkoshim – Lyanga – China
- – 650 km (400 mi): Osh – Bishkek
- – 179 km (111 mi): Kokpek – Kegen – Tyup
- – 360 km (220 mi): Almaty – Kokpek – Chundzha – Koktal – Khorgas
- – 180 km (110 mi): Sary-Ozek – Koktal
- – 182 km (113 mi): Usharal – Druzhba
- – 193 km (120 mi): Taskesken – Bakhty
- – 495 km (308 mi): Zapadnoe – Zhaksy – Atbasar – Astana
- – 320 km (200 mi): Yelabuga – Ufa
- – 1,071 km (665 mi): Jezkazgan – Karaganda – Pavlodar – Uspenovka
- – 289 km (180 mi): Petropavl – Zapadnoe

== Records ==
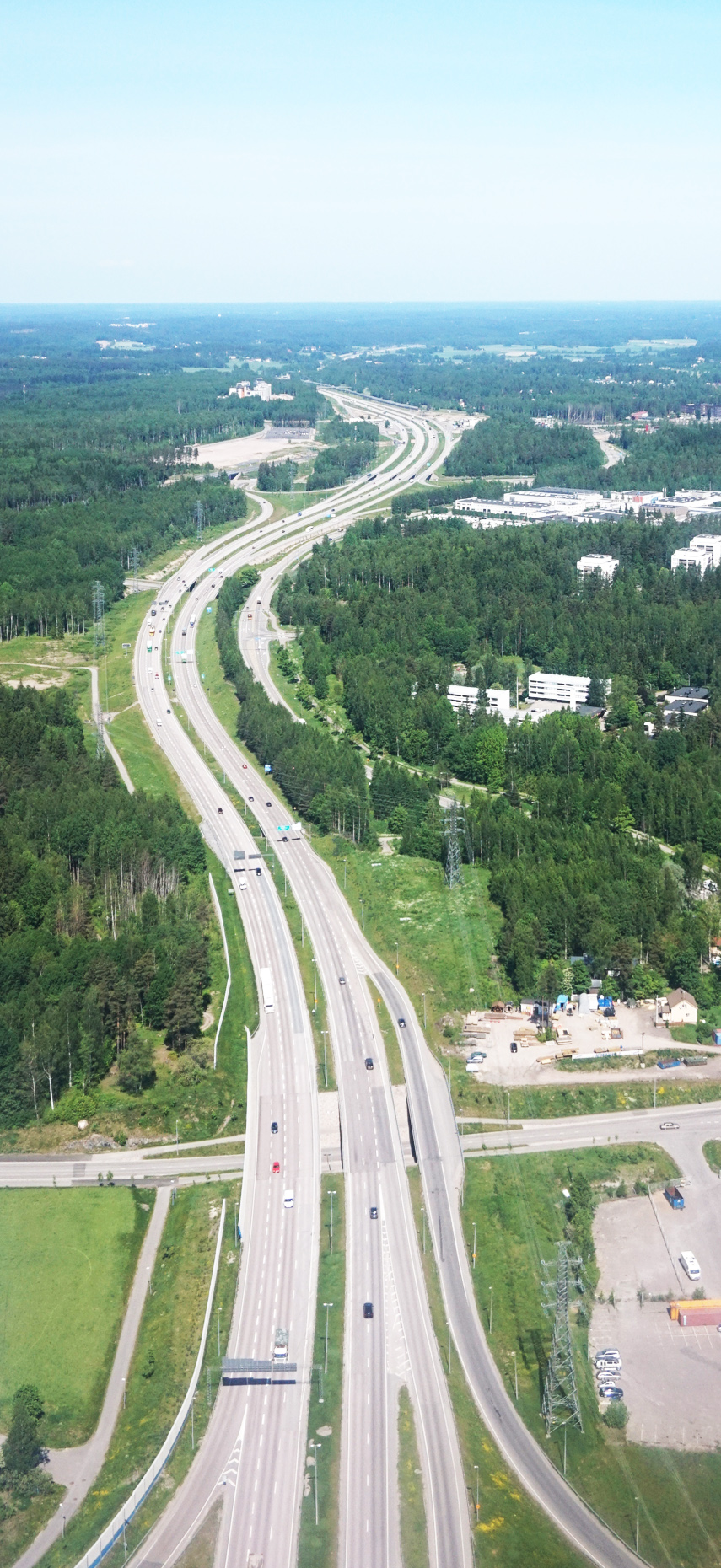
An aerial view of the European route E12 between the cities of Tampere and Helsinki in Finland

- E80, together with Asian Highway 1, crosses all of Europe and Asia, linking Lisbon with Tokyo.
- The longest E-road is E40, which is more than 8,500 km (5,300 mi) long, connecting France with Kazakhstan.
- The shortest E-road is E844, 22 km (14 mi), in the Italian region of Calabria
- Northernmost is E69, North Cape, Norway, 71°10' N
- Westernmost is E1, Lisbon, Portugal, 9°10' W
- Southernmost is E75, Crete, Greece, 35°6' N
- Easternmost is E127, Maykapshagay, Kazakhstan, 85°36' E
- The highest E-road is E008 which reaches 4,272 m (14,016 ft) altitude in the Pamir Mountains in Tajikistan.
- The highest E-road in Europe is E62 reaching 2,005 m (6,578 ft) at the Simplon Pass, Switzerland.
- The lowest E-road is E39 which reaches 262 m (860 ft) below sea level in the Bømlafjord Tunnel, Norway.
- The longest bridge on an E-road is the Crimean Bridge on E97 which is 16,900 metres (55,400 ft).
- The longest tunnel on an E-road is the Lærdal Tunnel (in Norway) on E16 which is 24,510 metres (80,410 ft), the longest road tunnel in the world. As of 2015 E16 includes 60 tunnels, covering about 15% of the road's 630 km (391 mi) within Norway.
- The E39 includes 9 ferry crossings.
- The E39 includes 90 tunnels, 6% of the road's 1,140 km (708 mi) within Norway.

== Historical numbering ==
These were the historical roads before 1975:

Number	Start	via	End
E1	London	– Southampton – Le Havre – Paris – Lyon – Nice – Ventimiglia – Genoa – La Spezia – Pisa – Livorno – Rome – Naples – Salerno – Reggio di Calabria – Messina –	Palermo
E2	London	– Dover – Calais – Reims – Dijon – Dole – Lausanne – Simplon – Milan – Parma – Modena – Bologna – Ancona – Foggia – Bari –	Brindisi
E3	Lisbon	– Salamanca – San Sebastián – Bordeaux – Paris – Lille – Gent – Antwerp – Eindhoven – Venlo – Oberhausen – Bielefeld – Hanover – Hamburg – Flensburg – Kolding – Frederikshavn – Gothenburg – Arboga –	Stockholm
E4	Lisbon	– Elvas – Mérida – Madrid – Zaragoza – Barcelona – Nîmes – Chambéry – Genf – Lausanne – Bern – Basel – Karlsruhe – Frankfurt (Main) – Kassel – Göttingen – Hanover – Hamburg – Lübeck – Fehmarn – Vordingborg – Copenhagen – Helsingør – Helsingborg – Jönköping – Stockholm – Uppsala – Sundsvall – Umeå – Tornio – Lahti –	Helsinki
E5	London	– Dover – Calais – Gent – Brussels – Liège – Cologne – Frankfurt (Main) – Würzburg – Nuremberg – Passau – Linz – Melk – Vienna – Nickelsdorf – Győr – Budapest – Szeged – Belgrade – Gevgelija – Thessaloniki – Alexandroupolis – Peplos – Ipsala – Silivri – Istanbul – İzmit – Bolu – Ankara – Aksaray – Adana – İskenderun –	Turkey/Syria border
E6	Rome	– Florence – Bologna – Modena – Verona – Trento – Brenner – Innsbruck – Griesen – Munich – Nuremberg – Hof – Leipzig – Berlin – Stralsund – Sassnitz – Trelleborg – Malmö – Helsingborg – Gothenburg – Svinesund – Oslo – Hamar – Otta – Trondheim – Mo i Rana – Alta	Kirkenes
E7	Rome	– Perugia – Forlì – Bologna – Ferrara – Padua – Mestre – Cervignano – Udine – Villach – Bruck an der Mur – Vienna – Brno – Český Těšín – Kraków –	Warsaw
E8	London	– Harwich – Hook of Holland – The Hague – Utrecht – Osnabrück – Hanover – Magdeburg – Berlin – Poznan – Krośniewice – Warsaw –	Poland/USSR border
E9	Amsterdam	– Maastricht – Liège – Arlon – Luxembourg – Metz – Strasbourg – Mulhouse – Basel – Olten – Luzern – Andermatt – (Gotthard) – Lugano – Chiasso – Como – Milan – Tortona –	Genoa
E10	Paris	– Cambrai – Brussels – Antwerp – Rotterdam – The Hague –	Amsterdam
E11	Paris	– Saint-Dizier – Nancy – Strasbourg – Karlsruhe – Stuttgart – Munich –	Salzburg
E12	Paris	– Metz – Saarbrücken – Mannheim – Nuremberg – Plzeň – Prague – Náchod – Kłodzko – Łódź – Warsaw – Białystok –	Moscow
E13	Lyon	– Modena – Turin – Milan – Brescia – Verona – Padua –	Venice
E14	Trieste	– Ronchi – Udine – Villach – Salzburg – Linz – Tábor – Prague – Jablonec –	Szczecin
E15	Hamburg	– Berlin – Dresden – Zinnwald – Prague – Brno – Břeclav – Bratislava –	Budapest
E16	Bratislava	– Český Těšín – Katowice – Łódź – Gdańsk –	Gdynia
E17	Chagny	– Dijon – Basel – Zürich – Winterthur – St. Gallen – St. Margarethen – Innsbruck – Wörgl –	Salzburg
E18	Stavanger	– Kristiansand – Larvik – Oslo – Karlstad – Arboga – Köping –	Stockholm
E19	Albania/Greece border	– Ioannina – Arta – Agrinio – Antirion – Rion –	Corinth
E20	Koritza	– Vari – Edessa – Thessaloniki –	Sofia
E21	Aosta	– Turin –	Savona
E21a	Martigny	– Grosser St. Bernhard –	Aosta
E21b	Geneva	– Bonneville – Mont-Blanc –	Aosta
E22	Berlin	– Wrocław – Opole – Bytom – Kraków – Rzeszów – Przemyśl –	Poland/USSR border
E23	Ankara	– Kirsehir – Kayseri – Sivas – Erzincan – Erzurum – Agri –	Turkey/Iran border
E24	Kömürler	– Gaziantep – Urfa – Mardin – Cizre – Hakkari – Bajerge –	Turkey/Iran border
E25	Burgos	– Madrid – Bailén – Sevilla – Cádiz –	Algeciras
E26	Barcelona	– Tarragona – Castellón de la Plana – Valencia – Granada – Málaga –	Algeciras
E31	London	– St. Albans – Northampton – Doncaster – Scotch Corner – Carlisle – Abington –	Glasgow
E32	Abington		Edinburgh
E33	Northampton	– Coventry – Cannock – Warrington –	Liverpool
E34	Amsterdam	– Cannock – Shrewsbury – Corwen –	Holyhead
E35	Amsterdam	– Amersfoort – Zwolle – Groningen – Winschoten – Oldenburg –	Hamburg
E36	Hook of Holland	– Rotterdam – Gouda – Utrecht – Arnhem – Oberhausen –	Cologne
E37	Breda	– Gorinchem –	Utrecht
E38	Breda		Eindhoven
E39	Antwerp	– Heerlen –	Aachen
E40	Brussels	– Namur –	Bastogne
E41	Calais	– Valenciennes – Mons – Charleroi – Namur –	Liège
E42	Phalsbourg	– Sarreguemines – Saarbrücken – Luxembourg – Echternach – Bitburg – Prüm – Euskirchen –	Cologne
E43	Avallon		Dijon
E44	Belfort		Mulhouse
E45	Dole	– La Curs – La Faucille – Gex –	Geneva
E46	Lyon	– Amberieu –	Geneva
E47	Aix-en-Provence		Marseille
E48	Nîmes		Marseille
E49	Bordeaux	– Toulouse –	Narbonne
E50	Coimbra	– Porto – Vigo – A Coruña – Oviedo – Santander – Bilbao –	San Sebastián
E51	Albergaria a Velha	– Viseu –	Celorico da Beira
E52	Vila Franca de Xira	– Pegões – Beja – Vila Verde de Ficalho – Rosal de la Frontera –	Sevilla
E53	Turin	– Asti – Alessandria –	Tortona
E54	Canteggio		Piacenza
E55	Pisa	– Migliarino –	Pistoia
E56	Ponte-Garigliano	– Caserta –	Foggia
E57	Naples		Arienzo
E58	Bari		Tarent
E59	Messina		Syracuse
E60	Arth		Zürich
E61	Bellinzona	– San Bernardino – Chur – St. Margrethen – Bregenz – Lindau –	Munich
E62	Hof	– Karl-Marx-Stadt – Leipzig – Halle –	Magdeburg
E63	Hamm	– Kassel – Herleshausen – Erfurt – Karl-Marx-Stadt –	Dresden
E64	Berlin	– Neubrandenburg – Rostock – Warnemünde – Gedser – Nykøbing – Vordingborg –	Copenhagen
E65	Lübeck	– Rostock –	Stralsund
E66	Esbjerg	– Kolding – Middelfart – Nyborg – Korsør – Copenhagen –	Malmö
E67	Vejle		Middelfart
E68	Bergen	– Gudvangen – Laerdalsöyra – Nystua – Fagernes –	Oslo
E69	Ålesund	– Åndalsnes –	Dombås
E70	Winterthur	– Schaffhausen – Donaueschingen – Tübingen – Stuttgart – Heilbronn – Schwäbisch Hall – Würzburg – Fulda – Hersfeld –	Herleshausen
E71	Hanover	– Bremen –	Bremerhaven
E72	Oldenzaal	– Lingen –	Bremen
E73	Cologne		Hamm
E74	Berlin		Szczecin
E75	Stjördal	– Storlien – Östersund –	Sundsvall
E77	Feldkirch		Buchs
E78	Tornio		Kilpisjärvi
E79	Vaasa	– Tampere –	Helsinki
E80	Turku	– Helsinki – Lappeenranta –	Imatra
E81	Gdańsk	– Elbląg – Ostróda – Mława – Warsaw – Lublin –	Poland/USSR border
E82	Piotrków Trybunalski		Warsaw
E83	Jelenia Gora	– Wrocław – Poznań – Świecie –	Grudziądz
E84	Prague	– Jihlava – Znojmo –	Vienna
E85	Olomouc	– Žilina – Prešov – Košice –	Romania/Bulgaria border
E86	Wörgl		Rosenheim
E87	Ioannina	– Trikkala – Larissa –	Volos
E88	Ioannina		Preveza
E89	Rion		Patras
E90	Vevi		Kozani
E91	Cervignano		Ronchi
E92	Thessaloniki	– Aghios Athanasios – Verria – Kozani – Larissa – Lamia – Athens – Corinth – Argos –	Kalamai
E93	Bruck an der Mur	– Graz – Spielfeld – Sentilj – Maribor –	Ljubljana
E94	Klagenfurt	– Loibltunnel – Ljubljana – Zagreb – Belgrad – Bela Crkva –	Yugoslavia/Romania border
E95	Nis	– Dimitrovgrad –	Yugoslavia/Bulgaria border
E96	Rijeka	– Zagreb – Čakovec – Donja Lendava –	Yugoslavia/Hungary border
E97	Bulgaria/Turkey border	– Edirne – Büyükkarıştıran –	Silivri
E98	Kemerhisar	– Niğde –	Kayseri
E99	Toprakkale	– Kahramanmaraş – Malatya – Elazığ – Tunceli –	Selepür
E101	Madrid		Valencia
E102	Mérida		Link with E52
E103	Bailén	– Granada – Motril –	Málaga

== See also ==
- European long-distance paths
- EuroVelo – European cycling network
- Pan-European corridors – EU road, rail and waterway investment priority areas
- Road transport – Collective term for all forms of transport which takes place on roads
- National Road network (Netherlands) a former system devised to complement the E-road network at a national level:
- Other intercontinental highway systems:
  - Asian Highway Network – International road network connecting Asia and parts of Europe
  - Arab Mashreq International Road Network – International road network in the Arab World
  - Interstate Highway System – Network of freeways in the United States
  - Trans-African Highway network – Transcontinental roads project in Africa
  - United States Numbered Highway System – Highway system of the United States of America
