= Georgiyevka =

Georgiyevka (Russian: Георгиевка) is the name of several rural localities in Russia:

- Georgiyevka, Loktevsky District, Altai Krai, a selo in Georgiyevsky Selsoviet of Loktevsky District of Altai Krai
- Georgiyevka, Rebrikhinsky District, Altai Krai, a selo in Georgiyevsky Selsoviet of Rebrikhinsky District of Altai Krai
- Georgiyevka, Tabunsky District, Altai Krai, a selo in Belozersky Selsoviet of Tabunsky District of Altai Krai
- Georgiyevka, Amur Oblast, a selo in Korolinsky Rural Settlement of Oktyabrsky District of Amur Oblast
- Georgiyevka, Bakalinsky District, Republic of Bashkortostan, a village in Starosharashlinsky Selsoviet of Bakalinsky District of the Republic of Bashkortostan
- Georgiyevka, Karmaskalinsky District, Republic of Bashkortostan, a village in Yefremkinsky Selsoviet of Karmaskalinsky District of the Republic of Bashkortostan
- Georgiyevka, Irkutsk Oblast, a village in Tayshetsky District of Irkutsk Oblast
- Georgiyevka, Kemerovo Oblast, a village in Stupishinskaya Rural Territory of Tyazhinsky District of Kemerovo Oblast
- Georgiyevka, Khabarovsk Krai, a selo in imeni Lazo District of Khabarovsk Krai
- Georgiyevka, Bogotolsky District, Krasnoyarsk Krai, a village in Yuryevsky Selsoviet of Bogotolsky District of Krasnoyarsk Krai
- Georgiyevka, Kansky District, Krasnoyarsk Krai, a selo in Georgiyevsky Selsoviet of Kansky District of Krasnoyarsk Krai
- Georgiyevka, Bereznegovatsky Selsoviet, Dobrinsky District, Lipetsk Oblast, a village in Bereznegovatsky Selsoviet of Dobrinsky District of Lipetsk Oblast
- Georgiyevka, Pavlovsky Selsoviet, Dobrinsky District, Lipetsk Oblast, a village in Pavlovsky Selsoviet of Dobrinsky District of Lipetsk Oblast
- Georgiyevka, Chistoozyorny District, Novosibirsk Oblast, a village in Chistoozyorny District, Novosibirsk Oblast
- Georgiyevka, Vengerovsky District, Novosibirsk Oblast, a village in Vengerovsky District, Novosibirsk Oblast
- Georgiyevka, Gorkovsky District, Omsk Oblast, a selo in Georgiyevsky Rural Okrug of Gorkovsky District of Omsk Oblast
- Georgiyevka, Kormilovsky District, Omsk Oblast, a selo in Georgiyevsky Rural Okrug of Kormilovsky District of Omsk Oblast
- Georgiyevka, Poltavsky District, Omsk Oblast, a selo in Olginsky Rural Okrug of Poltavsky District of Omsk Oblast
- Georgiyevka, Tyukalinsky District, Omsk Oblast, a village in Beloglazovsky Rural Okrug of Tyukalinsky District of Omsk Oblast
- Georgiyevka, Alexandrovsky District, Orenburg Oblast, a selo in Georgiyevsky Selsoviet of Alexandrovsky District of Orenburg Oblast
- Georgiyevka, Ponomaryovsky District, Orenburg Oblast, a settlement in Klyuchevsky Selsoviet of Ponomaryovsky District of Orenburg Oblast
- Georgiyevka, Samara Oblast, a selo in Kinelsky District of Samara Oblast
- Georgiyevka, Saratov Oblast, a selo in Marksovsky District of Saratov Oblast
- Georgiyevka, Tomsk Oblast, a village in Tomsky District of Tomsk Oblast
- Georgiyevka, Tula Oblast, a village in Kurakovsky Rural Okrug of Belyovsky District of Tula Oblast
- Georgiyevka, Voronezh Oblast, a selo in Rostashevskoye Rural Settlement of Paninsky District of Voronezh Oblast
- Georgiyevka, Zabaykalsky Krai, a selo in Nerchinsko-Zavodsky District of Zabaykalsky Krai
