= Ostrov, Russia =

Ostrov (Russian: О́стров) is the name of several inhabited localities in Russia.

== Bryansk Oblast ==
As of 2010, one rural locality in Bryansk Oblast bears this name:

- Ostrov, Bryansk Oblast, a village in Olsufyevsky Selsoviet of Zhukovsky District

== Ivanovo Oblast ==
As of 2010, two rural localities in Ivanovo Oblast bear this name:

- Ostrov, Komsomolsky District, Ivanovo Oblast, a village in Komsomolsky District
- Ostrov, Verkhnelandekhovsky District, Ivanovo Oblast, a village in Verkhnelandekhovsky District

== Kaluga Oblast ==
As of 2010, two rural localities in Kaluga Oblast bear this name:

- Ostrov, Zhizdrinsky District, Kaluga Oblast, a village in Zhizdrinsky District
- Ostrov, Zhukovsky District, Kaluga Oblast, a selo in Zhukovsky District

== Republic of Karelia ==
As of 2010, one rural locality in the Republic of Karelia bears this name:

- Ostrov, Republic of Karelia, a village in Pudozhsky District

== Kirov Oblast ==
As of 2010, three rural localities in Kirov Oblast bear this name:

- Ostrov, Kumensky District, Kirov Oblast, a village in Vichevsky Rural Okrug of Kumyonsky District
- Ostrov, Zarechensky Rural Okrug, Podosinovsky District, Kirov Oblast, a village in Zarechensky Rural Okrug of Podosinovsky District
- Ostrov, Podosinovets, Podosinovsky District, Kirov Oblast, a village under the administrative jurisdiction of the urban-type settlement of Podosinovets, Podosinovsky District

== Leningrad Oblast ==
As of 2010, eight rural localities in Leningrad Oblast bear this name:

- Ostrov, Bolshedvorskoye Settlement Municipal Formation, Boksitogorsky District, Leningrad Oblast, a village in Bolshedvorskoye Settlement Municipal Formation of Boksitogorsky District
- Ostrov, Radogoshchinskoye Settlement Municipal Formation, Boksitogorsky District, Leningrad Oblast, a village in Radogoshchinskoye Settlement Municipal Formation of Boksitogorsky District
- Ostrov, Gatchinsky District, Leningrad Oblast, a village under the administrative jurisdiction of Druzhnogorskoye Settlement Municipal Formation of Gatchinsky District
- Ostrov, Kirovsky District, Leningrad Oblast, a village in Sukhovskoye Settlement Municipal Formation of Kirovsky District
- Ostrov, Tikhvinsky District, Leningrad Oblast, a village in Melegezhskoye Settlement Municipal Formation of Tikhvinsky District
- Ostrov, Khvalovskoye Settlement Municipal Formation, Volkhovsky District, Leningrad Oblast, a village in Khvalovskoye Settlement Municipal Formation of Volkhovsky District
- Ostrov, Selivanovskoye Settlement Municipal Formation, Volkhovsky District, Leningrad Oblast, a village in Selivanovskoye Settlement Municipal Formation of Volkhovsky District
- Ostrov, Vyborgsky District, Leningrad Oblast, a logging depot settlement under the administrative jurisdiction of Kamennogorskoye Settlement Municipal Formation of Vyborgsky District

== Moscow Oblast ==
As of 2010, two rural localities in Moscow Oblast bear this name:

- Ostrov, Leninsky District, Moscow Oblast, a selo in Molokovskoye Rural Settlement of Leninsky District
- Ostrov, Taldomsky District, Moscow Oblast, a village in Yermolinskoye Rural Settlement of Taldomsky District

== Novgorod Oblast ==
As of 2010, eleven rural localities in Novgorod Oblast bear this name:

- Ostrov, Moykinskoye Settlement, Batetsky District, Novgorod Oblast, a village in Moykinskoye Settlement of Batetsky District
- Ostrov, Peredolskoye Settlement, Batetsky District, Novgorod Oblast, a village in Peredolskoye Settlement of Batetsky District
- Ostrov, Borovichsky District, Novgorod Oblast, a village in Zhelezkovskoye Settlement of Borovichsky District
- Ostrov, Demyansky District, Novgorod Oblast, a village in Polnovskoye Settlement of Demyansky District
- Ostrov, Khvoyninsky District, Novgorod Oblast, a village in Dvorishchenskoye Settlement of Khvoyninsky District
- Ostrov, Lyubytino, Lyubytinsky District, Novgorod Oblast, a village under the administrative jurisdiction of the urban-type settlement of Lyubytino, Lyubytinsky District
- Ostrov, Nebolchi, Lyubytinsky District, Novgorod Oblast, a village under the administrative jurisdiction of the urban-type settlement of Nebolchi, Lyubytinsky District
- Ostrov, Pestovsky District, Novgorod Oblast, a village in Bogoslovskoye Settlement of Pestovsky District
- Ostrov, Dubrovskoye Settlement, Soletsky District, Novgorod Oblast, a village in Dubrovskoye Settlement of Soletsky District
- Ostrov, Vybitskoye Settlement, Soletsky District, Novgorod Oblast, a village in Vybitskoye Settlement of Soletsky District
- Ostrov, Volotovsky District, Novgorod Oblast, a village in Slavitinskoye Settlement of Volotovsky District

== Oryol Oblast ==
As of 2010, three rural localities in Oryol Oblast bear this name:

- Ostrov, Kolpnyansky District, Oryol Oblast, a village in Yarishchensky Selsoviet of Kolpnyansky District
- Ostrov, Livensky District, Oryol Oblast, a selo in Ostrovskoy Selsoviet of Livensky District
- Ostrov, Maloarkhangelsky District, Oryol Oblast, a village in Podgorodnensky Selsoviet of Maloarkhangelsky District

== Perm Krai ==
As of 2010, one rural locality in Perm Krai bears this name:

- Ostrov, Perm Krai, a village in Yurlinsky District

== Pskov Oblast ==
As of 2010, nine inhabited localities in Pskov Oblast bear this name:

- Ostrov, Ostrovsky District, Pskov Oblast, a town in Ostrovsky District
- Ostrov, Bezhanitsky District, Pskov Oblast, a rural locality (a village) in Bezhanitsky District
- Ostrov, Gdovsky District, Pskov Oblast, a rural locality (a village) in Gdovsky District
- Ostrov (Artemovskaya Rural Settlement), Nevelsky District, Pskov Oblast, a rural locality (a village) in Nevelsky District; municipally, a part of Artemovskaya Rural Settlement of that district
- Ostrov (Plisskaya Rural Settlement), Nevelsky District, Pskov Oblast, a rural locality (a village) in Nevelsky District; municipally, a part of Plisskaya Rural Settlement of that district
- Ostrov, Novosokolnichesky District, Pskov Oblast, a rural locality (a village) in Novosokolnichesky District
- Ostrov, Plyussky District, Pskov Oblast, a rural locality (a village) in Plyussky District
- Ostrov, Pustoshkinsky District, Pskov Oblast, a rural locality (a village) in Pustoshkinsky District
- Ostrov, Strugo-Krasnensky District, Pskov Oblast, a rural locality (a village) in Strugo-Krasnensky District

== Smolensk Oblast ==
As of 2010, two rural localities in Smolensk Oblast bear this name:

- Ostrov, Roslavlsky District, Smolensk Oblast, a village in Ivanovskoye Rural Settlement of Roslavlsky District
- Ostrov, Smolensky District, Smolensk Oblast, a village in Talashkinskoye Rural Settlement of Smolensky District

== Tver Oblast ==
As of 2010, eight rural localities in Tver Oblast bear this name:

- Ostrov, Firovsky District, Tver Oblast, a village in Firovsky District
- Ostrov, Kimrsky District, Tver Oblast, a village in Kimrsky District
- Ostrov, Krasnokholmsky District, Tver Oblast, a village in Krasnokholmsky District
- Ostrov, Rameshkovsky District, Tver Oblast, a village in Rameshkovsky District
- Ostrov, Toropetsky District, Tver Oblast, a village in Toropetsky District
- Ostrov, Udomelsky District, Tver Oblast, a village in Udomelsky District
- Ostrov, Vesyegonsky District, Tver Oblast, a village in Vesyegonsky District
- Ostrov, Vyshnevolotsky District, Tver Oblast, a village in Vyshnevolotsky District

== Tyumen Oblast ==
As of 2010, one rural locality in Tyumen Oblast bears this name:

- Ostrov, Tyumen Oblast, a village in Ivanovsky Rural Okrug of Uvatsky District

== Vladimir Oblast ==
As of 2010, one rural locality in Vladimir Oblast bears this name:

- Ostrov, Vladimir Oblast, a village in Kameshkovsky District

== Volgograd Oblast ==
As of 2010, one rural locality in Volgograd Oblast bears this name:

- Ostrov, Volgograd Oblast, a khutor in Kachalinsky Selsoviet of Surovikinsky District

== Vologda Oblast ==
As of 2010, nine rural localities in Vologda Oblast bear this name:

- Ostrov, Belozersky District, Vologda Oblast, a village in Gulinsky Selsoviet of Belozersky District
- Ostrov, Bolshedvorsky Selsoviet, Cherepovetsky District, Vologda Oblast, a village in Bolshedvorsky Selsoviet of Cherepovetsky District
- Ostrov, Nikolo-Ramensky Selsoviet, Cherepovetsky District, Vologda Oblast, a village in Nikolo-Ramensky Selsoviet of Cherepovetsky District
- Ostrov, Voskresensky Selsoviet, Cherepovetsky District, Vologda Oblast, a village in Voskresensky Selsoviet of Cherepovetsky District
- Ostrov, Sheksninsky District, Vologda Oblast, a village in Nikolsky Selsoviet of Sheksninsky District
- Ostrov, Persky Selsoviet, Ustyuzhensky District, Vologda Oblast, a village in Persky Selsoviet of Ustyuzhensky District
- Ostrov, Soshnevsky Selsoviet, Ustyuzhensky District, Vologda Oblast, a village in Soshnevsky Selsoviet of Ustyuzhensky District
- Ostrov, Vashkinsky District, Vologda Oblast, a village in Ostrovsky Selsoviet of Vashkinsky District
- Ostrov, Vytegorsky District, Vologda Oblast, a village in Tudozersky Selsoviet of Vytegorsky District

== Yaroslavl Oblast ==
As of 2010, two rural localities in Yaroslavl Oblast bear this name:

- Ostrov, Gavrilov-Yamsky District, Yaroslavl Oblast, a selo in Mitinsky Rural Okrug of Gavrilov-Yamsky District
- Ostrov, Rostovsky District, Yaroslavl Oblast, a village in Tatishchevsky Rural Okrug of Rostovsky District
