= Russian Highways =

Russian state infrastructure and highway service company

- Type: state company
- Founded: 2009
- Headquarters: Russia
- Website: www.russianhighways.ru/en/about/mission/
- Footnotes; 109074, Moscow, Slavyanskaya sq., 2/5/4, bld. 3 Phone: +7 (495) 727-11-95 Fax: +7 (495) 784-68-04

The State Company Russian Highways (Russian: Государственная компания «Российские автомобильные дороги», commonly referred to as Avtodor) is the Russian state infrastructure and highway service company. The company was founded in 2009, and is based in Moscow.

Avtodor allocates and manages funds from the federal budget for the construction, development and operation of motorways and highways. Avtodor attracts private sector investments in the implementation of long-term infrastructure projects.

From 2013 to 2016, Avtodor announced bids for ten large-scale projects, including the financing, construction and operation of four central ring road start-up blocks, two phases in the construction of the new Moscow–Saint Petersburg motorway and a road to Tsemdolina that is part of the Novorossiysk transport hub. Bids were also announced for the design, renovation and operation of an M1 highway section and operation contracts for two M4 highway sections.
