= M38 =

M38 or M-38 may refer to:

- Willys M38, a light tactical vehicle, successor of the Willys MB
- Beretta Model 38, an Italian submachine gun
- M38 Wolfhound, a prototype American armoured car designed in 1944
- M-38 (Michigan highway), a state highway in Michigan
- M38 (Cape Town), a Metropolitan Route in Cape Town, South Africa
- M38 (Johannesburg), a Metropolitan Route in Johannesburg, South Africa
- M38 highway (Kazakhstan), a road connecting the border to Russia near Omsk and Georgiyevka
- Miles M.38 Messenger, a 1942 British four-seat liaison aircraft
- Messier 38, an open star cluster in the constellation Auriga
- Model 1938 Carbine, a version of the Mosin-Nagant rifle
- HMS Atherstone (M38) a British minesweeper
- MAS-38, a French WWII submachine gun
- M38 DMR, a designated marksman rifle used by the United States Marine Corps since 2017
