= European route E844 =

Road in trans-European E-road network

E844

Route information
- Length: 24 km (15 mi)

Major junctions
- From: Spezzano Albanese
- To: Sybaris

Location
- Countries: Italy

Highway system
- International E-road network; A Class; B Class

European route E 844 is a European B class road in Italy, connecting the cities Spezzano Albanese – Sybaris. With a length of 24 km (15 mi), it is the shortest E-road.

== Route ==
- Italy
  - Spezzano Albanese
  - E90 Sybaris
