= Sim, Russia =

Sim (Russian: Сим) is the name of several inhabited localities in Russia.

Urban localities

- Sim, Chelyabinsk Oblast, a town in Ashinsky District of Chelyabinsk Oblast

Rural localities

- Sim, Perm Krai, a settlement in Solikamsky District of Perm Krai
