= Sim, Perm Krai =

Russian rural locality

Coordinates: 59°52′07″N 57°20′58″E

Sim (Russian: Сим) is a rural locality (a settlement) in Solikamsky District of Perm Krai, Russia.
