= Ostrov, Vladimir Oblast =

Ostrov Остров
- Village
- Location within Vladimir Oblast Location within Russia
- Coordinates: 56°20′N 40°55′E
- Country: Russia
- Region: Vladimir Oblast
- District: Kameshkovsky District
- Time zone: UTC+3:00

Ostrov (Russian: Остров) is a rural locality (a village) in Sergeikhinskoye Rural Settlement, Kameshkovsky District, Vladimir Oblast, Russia. The population was 27 as of 2010.

== Geography ==
Ostrov is located 5 km west of Kameshkovo (the district's administrative centre) by road. Posyolok imeni Artyoma is the nearest rural locality.
