= Fetisovo =

Village in Kazakhstan

Coordinates: 42.756519°N 52.64204°E

Fetisovo is a village located in Kazakhstan on the coast of the Caspian Sea. The European route E121 passes by the area.
