= Georgiyevka, Amur Oblast =

Georgiyevka Георгиевка
- Selo
- Location within Amur Oblast Location within Russia
- Coordinates: 50°31′N 129°05′E
- Country: Russia
- Region: Amur Oblast
- District: Oktyabrsky District
- Time zone: UTC+9:00

Georgiyevka (Russian: Георгиевка) is a rural locality (a selo) in Korolinsky Selsoviet of Oktyabrsky District, Amur Oblast, Russia. The population was 38 in 2018. There is one street.

== Geography ==
Georgiyevka is 21 kilometers (13 mi) north of Yekaterinoslavka (the district's administrative center) by road. Koroli is the nearest rural locality.
