= Georgiyevka, Loktevsky District, Altai Krai =

Georgiyevka Георгиевка
- Village
- Location within Altai Krai Location within Russia
- Coordinates: 51°08′N 81°30′E
- Country: Russia
- Region: Altai Krai
- District: Loktevsky District
- Time zone: UTC+7:00

Georgiyevka (Russian: Георгиевка) is a rural locality (a selo) and the administrative center of Georgiyevsky Selsoviet of Loktevsky District, Altai Krai, Russia. The population was 532 as of 2016. There are 14 streets.

== Geography ==
Georgiyevka is located 22 km north of Gornyak (the district's administrative centre) by road. Ustyanka is the nearest rural locality.
