= Ostrov, Vashkinsky District, Vologda Oblast =

Ostrov Остров
- Village
- Location within Vologda Oblast Location within Russia
- Coordinates: 60°33′N 37°52′E
- Country: Russia
- Region: Vologda Oblast
- District: Vashkinsky District
- Time zone: UTC+3:00

Ostrov (Russian: Остров) is a rural locality (a village) in Andreyevskoye Rural Settlement, Vashkinsky District, Vologda Oblast, Russia. The population was 123 as of 2002. There are 2 streets.

== Geography ==
Ostrov is located 37 km north of Lipin Bor (the district's administrative centre) by road. Malaya Chagotma is the nearest rural locality.
