= Liman, Russia =

Liman (Russian: Лиман) is the name of several inhabited localities in Russia.

== Urban localities ==
- Liman, Astrakhan Oblast, a work settlement in Limansky District, Astrakhan Oblast

== Rural localities ==
- Liman, Kursk Oblast, a village in Donskoy Selsoviet of Zolotukhinsky District of Kursk Oblast
- Liman, Rostov Oblast, a khutor in Degtevskoye Rural Settlement of Millerovsky District of Rostov Oblast
- Liman, Stavropol Krai, a selo in Limansky Selsoviet of Ipatovsky District of Stavropol Krai
- Liman, Voronezh Oblast, a khutor in Fisenkovskoye Rural Settlement of Kantemirovsky District of Voronezh Oblast
