= Llobregat (disambiguation) =

The Llobregat is a river in Catalonia, Spain.

Llobregat may also refer to:

== Places in Spain ==
- Baix Llobregat, a comarca (county)
- Cornellà de Llobregat, a municipality
- Esplugues de Llobregat, a municipality
- El Prat de Llobregat, a municipality
- L'Hospitalet de Llobregat, a municipality
- Sant Boi de Llobregat, a municipality
- Sant Feliu de Llobregat, a municipality and capital of Baix Llobregat comarca

== Other uses ==
- Eix del Llobregat, another name for the C-16 highway in Catalonia
