= Georgiyevka, Zabaykalsky Krai =

Georgiyevka Георгиевка
- Selo
- Location within Zabaykalsky Krai Location within Russia
- Coordinates: 51°22′N 119°26′E
- Country: Russia
- Region: Zabaykalsky Krai
- District: Nerchinsko-Zavodsky District
- Time zone: UTC+9:00

Georgiyevka (Russian: Георгиевка) is a rural locality (a selo) in Nerchinsko-Zavodsky District, Zabaykalsky Krai, Russia. Population: 175 (2021 census); 266 (2010 census); 329 (2002 census); There are 4 streets in this selo.

== Geography ==
This rural locality is located 13 km from Nerchinsky Zavod (the district's administrative centre), 419 km from Chita (capital of Zabaykalsky Krai) and 5,701 km from Moscow. Pavlovka is the nearest rural locality.
