= Georgiyevka, Voronezh Oblast =

Georgiyevka Георгиевка
- Selo
- Location within Voronezh Oblast Location within Russia
- Coordinates: 51°40′N 40°03′E
- Country: Russia
- Region: Voronezh Oblast
- District: Paninsky District
- Time zone: UTC+3:00

Georgiyevka (Russian: Георгиевка) is a rural locality (a selo) in Rostashevskoye Rural Settlement, Paninsky District, Voronezh Oblast, Russia. The population was 117 as of 2010.

== Geography ==
Georgiyevka is located 8 km northwest of Panino (the district's administrative centre) by road. Bereznyagi is the nearest rural locality.
