= Georgiyevka, Rebrikhinsky District, Altai Krai =

Georgiyevka Георгиевка
- Selo
- Location within Altai Krai Location within Russia
- Coordinates: 52°51′N 82°02′E
- Country: Russia
- Region: Altai Krai
- District: Rebrikhinsky District
- Time zone: UTC+7:00

Georgiyevka (Russian: Георгиевка) is a rural locality (a selo) in Belovsky Selsoviet, Rebrikhinsky District, Altai Krai, Russia. The population was 542 as of 2013. There are 13 streets.

== Geography ==
Georgiyevka is located 37 km southwest of Rebrikha (the district's administrative centre) by road. Belovo and Pokrovka are the nearest rural localities.
