= Ostrov, Volgograd Oblast =

Ostrov Остров
- Khutor
- Location within Volgograd Oblast Location within Russia
- Coordinates: 48°43′N 43°12′E
- Country: Russia
- Region: Volgograd Oblast
- District: Surovikinsky District
- Time zone: UTC+4:00

Ostrov (Russian: Остров) is a rural locality (a khutor) in Kachalinskoye Rural Settlement, Surovikinsky District, Volgograd Oblast, Russia. The population was 246 as of 2010.

== Geography ==
Ostrov is located near the Lisa River, 36 km northeast of Surovikino (the district's administrative centre) by road. Kachalin is the nearest rural locality.
