= Tsemdolina =

Locality in Krasnodar Krai, Russia

Coordinates: 44°45′N 37°43′E

Tsemdolina (Russian: Цемдолина) is a locality on the territory of the City of Novorossiysk in Krasnodar Krai, Russia. While it is commonly being referred to as a selo, it is not officially classified as a separate inhabited locality and is thus not included in the registries of populated places.
