= Pavlovsky (inhabited locality) =

Pavlovsky (Russian: Па́вловский; masculine), Pavlovskaya (Па́вловская; feminine), or Pavlovskoye (Па́вловское; neuter) is the name of several inhabited localities in Russia.

== Altai Krai ==
As of 2010, one rural locality in Altai Krai bears this name:

- Pavlovsky, Altai Krai, a settlement in Zyatkovsky Selsoviet of Pankrushikhinsky District

== Arkhangelsk Oblast ==
As of 2010, eleven rural localities in Arkhangelsk Oblast bear this name:

- Pavlovskoye, Kotlassky District, Arkhangelsk Oblast, a village in Udimsky Selsoviet of Kotlassky District
- Pavlovskoye, Lipovsky Selsoviet, Velsky District, Arkhangelsk Oblast, a selo in Lipovsky Selsoviet of Velsky District
- Pavlovskoye, Poponavolotsky Selsoviet, Velsky District, Arkhangelsk Oblast, a selo in Poponavolotsky Selsoviet of Velsky District
- Pavlovskaya, Konoshsky District, Arkhangelsk Oblast, a village in Vadyinsky Selsoviet of Konoshsky District
- Pavlovskaya, Nyandomsky District, Arkhangelsk Oblast, a village in Lepshinsky Selsoviet of Nyandomsky District
- Pavlovskaya, Onezhsky District, Arkhangelsk Oblast, a village in Kokorinsky Selsoviet of Onezhsky District
- Pavlovskaya, Shegovarsky Selsoviet, Shenkursky District, Arkhangelsk Oblast, a village in Shegovarsky Selsoviet of Shenkursky District
- Pavlovskaya, Syumsky Selsoviet, Shenkursky District, Arkhangelsk Oblast, a village in Syumsky Selsoviet of Shenkursky District
- Pavlovskaya, Ust-Padengsky Selsoviet, Shenkursky District, Arkhangelsk Oblast, a village in Ust-Padengsky Selsoviet of Shenkursky District
- Pavlovskaya, Velsky District, Arkhangelsk Oblast, a village in Ust-Velsky Selsoviet of Velsky District
- Pavlovskaya, Verkhnetoyemsky District, Arkhangelsk Oblast, a village in Verkhnetoyemsky Selsoviet of Verkhnetoyemsky District

== Belgorod Oblast ==
As of 2010, one rural locality in Belgorod Oblast bears this name:

- Pavlovsky, Belgorod Oblast, a settlement in Ivnyansky District

== Bryansk Oblast ==
As of 2010, three rural localities in Bryansk Oblast bear this name:

- Pavlovsky, Klintsovsky District, Bryansk Oblast, a settlement in Korzhovogolubovsky Rural Administrative Okrug of Klintsovsky District
- Pavlovsky, Vygonichsky District, Bryansk Oblast, a settlement in Khmelevsky Rural Administrative Okrug of Vygonichsky District
- Pavlovskoye, Bryansk Oblast, a village in Fedorovsky Rural Administrative Okrug of Rognedinsky District

== Chelyabinsk Oblast ==
As of 2010, one rural locality in Chelyabinsk Oblast bears this name:

- Pavlovsky, Chelyabinsk Oblast, a settlement in Pavlovsky Selsoviet of Bredinsky District

== Kirov Oblast ==
As of 2010, one rural locality in Kirov Oblast bears this name:

- Pavlovskaya, Kirov Oblast, a village in Ichetovkinsky Rural Okrug of Afanasyevsky District

== Kostroma Oblast ==
As of 2010, one rural locality in Kostroma Oblast bears this name:

- Pavlovskoye, Kostroma Oblast, a selo in Tsentralnoye Settlement of Buysky District

== Krasnodar Krai ==
As of 2010, two rural localities in Krasnodar Krai bear this name:

- Pavlovsky, Krasnodar Krai, a khutor in Keslerovsky Rural Okrug of Krymsky District
- Pavlovskaya, Krasnodar Krai, a stanitsa in Pavlovsky Stanitsa Okrug of Pavlovsky District

== Leningrad Oblast ==
As of 2010, one rural locality in Leningrad Oblast bears this name:

- Pavlovsky, Leningrad Oblast, a khutor under the administrative jurisdiction of Naziyevskoye Settlement Municipal Formation of Kirovsky District

== Lipetsk Oblast ==
As of 2010, one rural locality in Lipetsk Oblast bears this name:

- Pavlovskoye, Lipetsk Oblast, a selo in Pavlovsky Selsoviet of Lebedyansky District

== Mari El Republic ==
As of 2010, one rural locality in the Mari El Republic bears this name:

- Pavlovsky, Mari El Republic, a vyselok in Shulkinsky Rural Okrug of Orshansky District

== Moscow Oblast ==
As of 2010, seven rural localities in Moscow Oblast bear this name:

- Pavlovskoye, Domodedovo, Moscow Oblast, a village under the administrative jurisdiction of Domodedovo City Under Oblast Jurisdiction
- Pavlovskoye, Istrinsky District, Moscow Oblast, a village in Ivanovskoye Rural Settlement of Istrinsky District
- Pavlovskoye, Lotoshinsky District, Moscow Oblast, a village under the administrative jurisdiction of the Work Settlement of Lotoshino in Lotoshinsky District
- Pavlovskoye, Lukhovitsky District, Moscow Oblast, a village in Gazoprovodskoye Rural Settlement of Lukhovitsky District
- Pavlovskoye, Stepankovskoye Rural Settlement, Shakhovskoy District, Moscow Oblast, a village in Stepankovskoye Rural Settlement of Shakhovskoy District
- Pavlovskoye, Shakhovskaya Work Settlement, Shakhovskoy District, Moscow Oblast, a village under the administrative jurisdiction of the Work Settlement of Shakhovskaya in Shakhovskoy District
- Pavlovskoye, Taldomsky District, Moscow Oblast, a village in Yermolinskoye Rural Settlement of Taldomsky District

== Nizhny Novgorod Oblast ==
As of 2010, one rural locality in Nizhny Novgorod Oblast bears this name:

- Pavlovsky, Nizhny Novgorod Oblast, a pochinok in Karpunikhinsky Selsoviet of Urensky District

== Perm Krai ==
As of 2010, one urban locality in Perm Krai bears this name:

- Pavlovsky, Perm Krai, a work settlement in Ochyorsky District

== Rostov Oblast ==
As of 2010, one rural locality in Rostov Oblast bears this name:

- Pavlovsky, Rostov Oblast, a khutor in Verkhnyakovskoye Rural Settlement of Verkhnedonskoy District

== Ryazan Oblast ==
As of 2010, one rural locality in Ryazan Oblast bears this name:

- Pavlovskoye, Ryazan Oblast, a selo in Pavlovsky Rural Okrug of Miloslavsky District

== Smolensk Oblast ==
As of 2010, one rural locality in Smolensk Oblast bears this name:

- Pavlovskoye, Smolensk Oblast, a village in Pavlovskoye Rural Settlement of Tyomkinsky District

== Tambov Oblast ==
As of 2010, one rural locality in Tambov Oblast bears this name:

- Pavlovsky, Tambov Oblast, a settlement in Ozersky Selsoviet of Rasskazovsky District

== Tula Oblast ==
As of 2010, three rural localities in Tula Oblast bear this name:

- Pavlovskoye, Odoyevsky District, Tula Oblast, a selo in Zhemchuzhnikovskaya Rural Administration of Odoyevsky District
- Pavlovskoye, Venyovsky District, Tula Oblast, a village in Setsky Rural Okrug of Venyovsky District
- Pavlovskoye, Yasnogorsky District, Tula Oblast, a village in Pervomayskaya Rural Territory of Yasnogorsky District

== Tver Oblast ==
As of 2010, eight rural localities in Tver Oblast bear this name:

- Pavlovskoye, Kalininsky District, Tver Oblast, a village in Chernogubovskoye Rural Settlement of Kalininsky District
- Pavlovskoye, Kashinsky District, Tver Oblast, a village in Bulatovskoye Rural Settlement of Kashinsky District
- Pavlovskoye, Kesovogorsky District, Tver Oblast, a village in Nikolskoye Rural Settlement of Kesovogorsky District
- Pavlovskoye, Kuvshinovsky District, Tver Oblast, a village in Penskoye Rural Settlement of Kuvshinovsky District
- Pavlovskoye, Maksatikhinsky District, Tver Oblast, a village in Budenovskoye Rural Settlement of Maksatikhinsky District
- Pavlovskoye, Molokovsky District, Tver Oblast, a village in Molokovskoye Rural Settlement of Molokovsky District
- Pavlovskoye, Staritsky District, Tver Oblast, a village in Bernovskoye Rural Settlement of Staritsky District
- Pavlovskoye, Vesyegonsky District, Tver Oblast, a village in Yegonskoye Rural Settlement of Vesyegonsky District

== Vladimir Oblast ==
As of 2010, four rural localities in Vladimir Oblast bear this name:

- Pavlovskoye, Kovrovsky District, Vladimir Oblast, a selo in Kovrovsky District
- Pavlovskoye, Suzdalsky District, Vladimir Oblast, a selo in Suzdalsky District
- Pavlovskoye, Yuryev-Polsky District, Vladimir Oblast, a selo in Yuryev-Polsky District
- Pavlovskaya, Vladimir Oblast, a village in Sudogodsky District

== Volgograd Oblast ==
As of 2010, three rural localities in Volgograd Oblast bear this name:

- Pavlovsky, Volgograd, Volgograd Oblast, a khutor in Sarpinsky Selsoviet of the city of oblast significance of Volgograd
- Pavlovsky, Alexeyevsky District, Volgograd Oblast, a khutor in Bolshebabinsky Selsoviet of Alexeyevsky District
- Pavlovsky, Nekhayevsky District, Volgograd Oblast, a khutor in Nekhayevsky Selsoviet of Nekhayevsky District

== Vologda Oblast ==
As of 2010, fourteen rural localities in Vologda Oblast bear this name:

- Pavlovskoye, Cherepovetsky District, Vologda Oblast, a village in Ivanovsky Selsoviet of Cherepovetsky District
- Pavlovskoye, Gryazovetsky District, Vologda Oblast, a village in Lezhsky Selsoviet of Gryazovetsky District
- Pavlovskoye, Sheksninsky District, Vologda Oblast, a village in Sizemsky Selsoviet of Sheksninsky District
- Pavlovskoye, Ust-Kubinsky District, Vologda Oblast, a village in Filisovsky Selsoviet of Ust-Kubinsky District
- Pavlovskoye, Ustyuzhensky District, Vologda Oblast, a village in Nikolsky Selsoviet of Ustyuzhensky District
- Pavlovskoye, Velikoustyugsky District, Vologda Oblast, a village in Strelensky Selsoviet of Velikoustyugsky District
- Pavlovskaya, Kharovsky District, Vologda Oblast, a village in Razinsky Selsoviet of Kharovsky District
- Pavlovskaya, Kichmengsko-Gorodetsky District, Vologda Oblast, a village in Shestakovsky Selsoviet of Kichmengsko-Gorodetsky District
- Pavlovskaya, Shevdenitsky Selsoviet, Tarnogsky District, Vologda Oblast, a village in Shevdenitsky Selsoviet of Tarnogsky District
- Pavlovskaya, Verkhovsky Selsoviet, Tarnogsky District, Vologda Oblast, a village in Verkhovsky Selsoviet of Tarnogsky District
- Pavlovskaya, Totemsky District, Vologda Oblast, a village in Ust-Pechengsky Selsoviet of Totemsky District
- Pavlovskaya, Nizhneslobodsky Selsoviet, Vozhegodsky District, Vologda Oblast, a village in Nizhneslobodsky Selsoviet of Vozhegodsky District
- Pavlovskaya, Vozhegodsky Selsoviet, Vozhegodsky District, Vologda Oblast, a village in Vozhegodsky Selsoviet of Vozhegodsky District
- Pavlovskaya, Yavengsky Selsoviet, Vozhegodsky District, Vologda Oblast, a village in Yavengsky Selsoviet of Vozhegodsky District

== Voronezh Oblast ==
As of 2010, one rural locality in Voronezh Oblast bears this name:

- Pavlovsky, Voronezh Oblast, a settlement in Krinichenskoye Rural Settlement of Ostrogozhsky District

== Yaroslavl Oblast ==
As of 2010, thirteen rural localities in Yaroslavl Oblast bear this name:

- Pavlovskoye, Danilovsky District, Yaroslavl Oblast, a village in Maryinsky Rural Okrug of Danilovsky District
- Pavlovskoye, Lyubimsky District, Yaroslavl Oblast, a village in Voskresensky Rural Okrug of Lyubimsky District
- Pavlovskoye, Nekrasovsky District, Yaroslavl Oblast, a selo in Nikolsky Rural Okrug of Nekrasovsky District
- Pavlovskoye, Pervomaysky District, Yaroslavl Oblast, a village in Prechistensky Rural Okrug of Pervomaysky District
- Pavlovskoye, Rostovsky District, Yaroslavl Oblast, a selo in Lyubilkovsky Rural Okrug of Rostovsky District
- Pavlovskoye, Borisoglebsky Rural Okrug, Tutayevsky District, Yaroslavl Oblast, a village in Borisoglebsky Rural Okrug of Tutayevsky District
- Pavlovskoye, Fominsky Rural Okrug, Tutayevsky District, Yaroslavl Oblast, a village in Fominsky Rural Okrug of Tutayevsky District
- Pavlovskoye, Uglichsky District, Yaroslavl Oblast, a selo in Vozdvizhensky Rural Okrug of Uglichsky District
- Pavlovskoye, Glebovsky Rural Okrug, Yaroslavsky District, Yaroslavl Oblast, a village in Glebovsky Rural Okrug of Yaroslavsky District
- Pavlovskoye, Mordvinovsky Rural Okrug, Yaroslavsky District, Yaroslavl Oblast, a village in Mordvinovsky Rural Okrug of Yaroslavsky District
- Pavlovskoye, Tochishchensky Rural Okrug, Yaroslavsky District, Yaroslavl Oblast, a village in Tochishchensky Rural Okrug of Yaroslavsky District
- Pavlovskoye, Tolbukhinsky Rural Okrug, Yaroslavsky District, Yaroslavl Oblast, a village in Tolbukhinsky Rural Okrug of Yaroslavsky District
- Pavlovskaya, Yaroslavl Oblast, a village in Vereteysky Rural Okrug of Nekouzsky District

== See also ==
- Pavel
- Pavlov (disambiguation)
- Pavlovka (disambiguation)
- Pavlovsk (disambiguation)
- Pavlovo
