= Pavlovka, Russia =

Pavlovka (Russian: Павловка) is the name of several inhabited localities in Russia.

== Altai Krai ==
As of 2010, five rural localities in Altai Krai bear this name:

- Pavlovka, Slavgorod, Altai Krai, a selo under the administrative jurisdiction of the town of krai significance of Slavgorod
- Pavlovka, Bayevsky District, Altai Krai, a selo in Nizhnechumansky Selsoviet of Bayevsky District
- Pavlovka, Loktevsky District, Altai Krai, a selo in Alexandrovsky Selsoviet of Loktevsky District
- Pavlovka, Novichikhinsky District, Altai Krai, a selo in Solonovsky Selsoviet of Novichikhinsky District
- Pavlovka, Uglovsky District, Altai Krai, a selo in Pavlovsky Selsoviet of Uglovsky District

== Amur Oblast ==
As of 2010, two rural localities in Amur Oblast bear this name:

- Pavlovka, Belogorsky District, Amur Oblast, a selo in Vasilyevsky Rural Settlement of Belogorsky District
- Pavlovka, Seryshevsky District, Amur Oblast, a selo in Lermontovsky Rural Settlement of Seryshevsky District

== Republic of Bashkortostan ==
As of 2010, five rural localities in the Republic of Bashkortostan bear this name:

- Pavlovka, Bizhbulyaksky District, Republic of Bashkortostan, a village in Sukhorechensky Selsoviet of Bizhbulyaksky District
- Pavlovka, Gafuriysky District, Republic of Bashkortostan, a village in Tabynsky Selsoviet of Gafuriysky District
- Pavlovka, Ishimbaysky District, Republic of Bashkortostan, a village in Petrovsky Selsoviet of Ishimbaysky District
- Pavlovka, Kuyurgazinsky District, Republic of Bashkortostan, a village in Krivle-Ilyushkinsky Selsoviet of Kuyurgazinsky District
- Pavlovka, Nurimanovsky District, Republic of Bashkortostan, a selo in Pavlovsky Selsoviet of Nurimanovsky District

== Belgorod Oblast ==
As of 2010, three rural localities in Belgorod Oblast bear this name:

- Pavlovka, Chernyansky District, Belgorod Oblast, a selo in Chernyansky District
- Pavlovka, Korochansky District, Belgorod Oblast, a selo in Korochansky District
- Pavlovka, Valuysky District, Belgorod Oblast, a khutor in Biryuchansky Rural Okrug of Valuysky District

== Bryansk Oblast ==
As of 2013, three rural localities in Bryansk Oblast bear this name:

- Pavlovka, Unechsky District, Bryansk Oblast, a selo in Pavlovsky Selsoviet of Unechsky District
- Pavlovka, Vygonichsky District, Bryansk Oblast, a village in Utynsky Selsoviet of Vygonichsky District
- Pavlovka, Zlynkovsky District, Bryansk Oblast, a settlement under the administrative jurisdiction of Zlynka Urban Administrative Okrug of Zlynkovsky District

== Irkutsk Oblast ==
As of 2010, one rural locality in Irkutsk Oblast bears this name:

- Pavlovka, Irkutsk Oblast, a village in Tulunsky District

== Kaluga Oblast ==
As of 2010, five rural localities in Kaluga Oblast bear this name:

- Pavlovka, Duminichsky District, Kaluga Oblast, a village in Duminichsky District
- Pavlovka, Khvastovichsky District, Kaluga Oblast, a village in Khvastovichsky District
- Pavlovka, Maloyaroslavetsky District, Kaluga Oblast, a village in Maloyaroslavetsky District
- Pavlovka, Zhizdrinsky District, Kaluga Oblast, a village in Zhizdrinsky District
- Pavlovka, Zhukovsky District, Kaluga Oblast, a village in Zhukovsky District

== Kemerovo Oblast ==
As of 2010, one rural locality in Kemerovo Oblast bears this name:

- Pavlovka, Kemerovo Oblast, a settlement in Podgornovskaya Rural Territory of Leninsk-Kuznetsky District

== Krasnoyarsk Krai ==
As of 2010, four rural localities in Krasnoyarsk Krai bear this name:

- Pavlovka, Bogotolsky District, Krasnoyarsk Krai, a village in Vaginsky Selsoviet of Bogotolsky District
- Pavlovka, Nazarovsky District, Krasnoyarsk Krai, a selo in Pavlovsky Selsoviet of Nazarovsky District
- Pavlovka, Nizhneingashsky District, Krasnoyarsk Krai, a village in Pavlovsky Selsoviet of Nizhneingashsky District
- Pavlovka, Sayansky District, Krasnoyarsk Krai, a village in Aginsky Selsoviet of Sayansky District

== Kursk Oblast ==
As of 2010, seven rural localities in Kursk Oblast bear this name:

- Pavlovka, Fatezhsky District, Kursk Oblast, a khutor in Soldatsky Selsoviet of Fatezhsky District
- Pavlovka, Konyshyovsky District, Kursk Oblast, a village in Glazovsky Selsoviet of Konyshyovsky District
- Pavlovka, Kurchatovsky District, Kursk Oblast, a village in Kolpakovsky Selsoviet of Kurchatovsky District
- Pavlovka, Oboyansky District, Kursk Oblast, a selo in Pavlovsky Selsoviet of Oboyansky District
- Pavlovka, Pristensky District, Kursk Oblast, a khutor in Verkhneploskovsky Selsoviet of Pristensky District
- Pavlovka, Rylsky District, Kursk Oblast, a village in Durovsky Selsoviet of Rylsky District
- Pavlovka, Sovetsky District, Kursk Oblast, a village in Natalyinsky Selsoviet of Sovetsky District

== Lipetsk Oblast ==
As of 2010, four rural localities in Lipetsk Oblast bear this name:

- Pavlovka, Dankovsky District, Lipetsk Oblast, a village in Perekhvalsky Selsoviet of Dankovsky District
- Pavlovka, Dobrinsky District, Lipetsk Oblast, a selo in Pavlovsky Selsoviet of Dobrinsky District
- Pavlovka, Izmalkovsky District, Lipetsk Oblast, a village in Preobrazhensky Selsoviet of Izmalkovsky District
- Pavlovka, Zadonsky District, Lipetsk Oblast, a village in Khmelinetsky Selsoviet of Zadonsky District

== Republic of Mordovia ==
As of 2010, five rural localities in the Republic of Mordovia bear this name:

- Pavlovka, Atyuryevsky District, Republic of Mordovia, a village in Novochadovsky Selsoviet of Atyuryevsky District
- Pavlovka, Ichalkovsky District, Republic of Mordovia, a settlement in Obrochinsky Selsoviet of Ichalkovsky District
- Pavlovka, Lyambirsky District, Republic of Mordovia, a selo in Skryabinsky Selsoviet of Lyambirsky District
- Pavlovka, Staroshaygovsky District, Republic of Mordovia, a village in Bogdanovsky Selsoviet of Staroshaygovsky District
- Pavlovka, Temnikovsky District, Republic of Mordovia, a village in Zhegalovsky Selsoviet of Temnikovsky District

== Nizhny Novgorod Oblast ==
As of 2010, three rural localities in Nizhny Novgorod Oblast bear this name:

- Pavlovka, Bolsheboldinsky District, Nizhny Novgorod Oblast, a settlement in Pikshensky Selsoviet of Bolsheboldinsky District
- Pavlovka, Perevozsky District, Nizhny Novgorod Oblast, a village in Paletsky Selsoviet of Perevozsky District
- Pavlovka, Sergachsky District, Nizhny Novgorod Oblast, a village in Lopatinsky Selsoviet of Sergachsky District

== Novgorod Oblast ==
As of 2010, one rural locality in Novgorod Oblast bears this name:

- Pavlovka, Novgorod Oblast, a village in Zhelezkovskoye Settlement of Borovichsky District

== Novosibirsk Oblast ==
As of 2010, three rural localities in Novosibirsk Oblast bear this name:

- Pavlovka, Chistoozyorny District, Novosibirsk Oblast, a selo in Chistoozyorny District
- Pavlovka, Karasuksky District, Novosibirsk Oblast, a village in Karasuksky District
- Pavlovka, Kuybyshevsky District, Novosibirsk Oblast, a village in Kuybyshevsky District

== Omsk Oblast ==
As of 2010, four rural localities in Omsk Oblast bear this name:

- Pavlovka, Muromtsevsky District, Omsk Oblast, a village under the administrative jurisdiction of the work settlement of Muromtsevo in Muromtsevsky District
- Pavlovka, Okoneshnikovsky District, Omsk Oblast, a village in Sergeyevsky Rural Okrug of Okoneshnikovsky District
- Pavlovka, Sargatsky District, Omsk Oblast, a village in Bazhenovsky Rural Okrug of Sargatsky District
- Pavlovka, Sedelnikovsky District, Omsk Oblast, a village in Golubovsky Rural Okrug of Sedelnikovsky District

== Orenburg Oblast ==
As of 2010, two rural localities in Orenburg Oblast bear this name:

- Pavlovka, Orenburgsky District, Orenburg Oblast, a selo in Podgorodne-Pokrovsky Selsoviet of Orenburgsky District
- Pavlovka, Severny District, Orenburg Oblast, a village in Kamennogorsky Selsoviet of Severny District

== Oryol Oblast ==
As of 2010, three rural localities in Oryol Oblast bear this name:

- Pavlovka, Kolpnyansky District, Oryol Oblast, a village in Ushakovsky Selsoviet of Kolpnyansky District
- Pavlovka, Krasnozorensky District, Oryol Oblast, a village in Krasnozorensky Selsoviet of Krasnozorensky District
- Pavlovka, Maloarkhangelsky District, Oryol Oblast, a village in Podgorodnensky Selsoviet of Maloarkhangelsky District

== Penza Oblast ==
As of 2010, two rural localities in Penza Oblast bear this name:

- Pavlovka, Nikolsky District, Penza Oblast, a selo in Maissky Selsoviet of Nikolsky District
- Pavlovka, Tamalinsky District, Penza Oblast, a settlement in Ulyanovsky Selsoviet of Tamalinsky District

== Perm Krai ==
As of 2010, one rural locality in Perm Krai bears this name:

- Pavlovka, Perm Krai, a selo in Chernushinsky District

== Primorsky Krai ==
As of 2010, two rural localities in Primorsky Krai bear this name:

- Pavlovka, Chuguyevsky District, Primorsky Krai, a selo in Chuguyevsky District
- Pavlovka, Mikhaylovsky District, Primorsky Krai, a selo in Mikhaylovsky District

== Rostov Oblast ==
As of 2010, five rural localities in Rostov Oblast bear this name:

- Pavlovka, Azovsky District, Rostov Oblast, a khutor in Novoalexandrovskoye Rural Settlement of Azovsky District
- Pavlovka, Chertkovsky District, Rostov Oblast, a khutor in Olkhovchanskoye Rural Settlement of Chertkovsky District
- Pavlovka, Krasnosulinsky District, Rostov Oblast, a selo in Kiselevskoye Rural Settlement of Krasnosulinsky District
- Pavlovka, Milyutinsky District, Rostov Oblast, a khutor in Mankovo-Berezovskoye Rural Settlement of Milyutinsky District
- Pavlovka, Tarasovsky District, Rostov Oblast, a khutor in Yefremovo-Stepanovskoye Rural Settlement of Tarasovsky District

== Ryazan Oblast ==
As of 2010, nine rural localities in Ryazan Oblast bear this name:

- Pavlovka, Nikitinsky Rural Okrug, Korablinsky District, Ryazan Oblast, a village in Nikitinsky Rural Okrug of Korablinsky District
- Pavlovka, Nikolayevsky Rural Okrug, Korablinsky District, Ryazan Oblast, a village in Nikolayevsky Rural Okrug of Korablinsky District
- Pavlovka, Mikhaylovsky District, Ryazan Oblast, a village in Zhmurovsky Rural Okrug of Mikhaylovsky District
- Pavlovka, Alexandro-Nevsky District, Ryazan Oblast, a village in Pavlovsky Rural Okrug of Alexandro-Nevsky District
- Pavlovka, Putyatinsky District, Ryazan Oblast, a settlement in Beregovskoy Rural Okrug of Putyatinsky District
- Pavlovka, Ryazansky District, Ryazan Oblast, a village in Vyshetravinsky Rural Okrug of Ryazansky District
- Pavlovka, Sarayevsky District, Ryazan Oblast, a village in Bogolyubovsky Rural Okrug of Sarayevsky District
- Pavlovka, Shilovsky District, Ryazan Oblast, a village in Zanino-Pochinkovsky Rural Okrug of Shilovsky District
- Pavlovka, Spassky District, Ryazan Oblast, a settlement in Kiritsky Rural Okrug of Spassky District

== Samara Oblast ==
As of 2010, five rural localities in Samara Oblast bear this name:

- Pavlovka, Alexeyevsky District, Samara Oblast, a selo in Alexeyevsky District
- Pavlovka, Kinelsky District, Samara Oblast, a selo in Kinelsky District
- Pavlovka, Krasnoarmeysky District, Samara Oblast, a selo in Krasnoarmeysky District
- Pavlovka, Sergiyevsky District, Samara Oblast, a selo in Sergiyevsky District
- Pavlovka, Yelkhovsky District, Samara Oblast, a village in Yelkhovsky District

== Saratov Oblast ==
As of 2010, six rural localities in Saratov Oblast bear this name:

- Pavlovka, Atkarsky District, Saratov Oblast, a village in Atkarsky District
- Pavlovka (Privolzhskoye Rural Settlement), Marksovsky District, Saratov Oblast, a selo in Marksovsky District; municipally, a part of Privolzhskoye Rural Settlement of that district
- Pavlovka (Podlesnovskoye Rural Settlement), Marksovsky District, Saratov Oblast, a selo in Marksovsky District; municipally, a part of Podlesnovskoye Rural Settlement of that district
- Pavlovka, Petrovsky District, Saratov Oblast, a village in Petrovsky District
- Pavlovka, Turkovsky District, Saratov Oblast, a village in Turkovsky District
- Pavlovka, Yekaterinovsky District, Saratov Oblast, a village in Yekaterinovsky District

== Smolensk Oblast ==
As of 2010, two rural localities in Smolensk Oblast bear this name:

- Pavlovka, Gryazenyatskoye Rural Settlement, Roslavlsky District, Smolensk Oblast, a village in Gryazenyatskoye Rural Settlement of Roslavlsky District
- Pavlovka, Osterskoye Rural Settlement, Roslavlsky District, Smolensk Oblast, a village in Osterskoye Rural Settlement of Roslavlsky District

== Stavropol Krai ==
As of 2010, one rural locality in Stavropol Krai bears this name:

- Pavlovka, Stavropol Krai, a khutor in Vodorazdelny Selsoviet of Andropovsky District

== Tambov Oblast ==
As of 2010, fourteen rural localities in Tambov Oblast bear this name:

- Pavlovka, Bondarsky District, Tambov Oblast, a village in Kershinsky Selsoviet of Bondarsky District
- Pavlovka, Kondaurovsky Selsoviet, Gavrilovsky District, Tambov Oblast, a village in Kondaurovsky Selsoviet of Gavrilovsky District
- Pavlovka, Osino-Gaysky Selsoviet, Gavrilovsky District, Tambov Oblast, a village in Osino-Gaysky Selsoviet of Gavrilovsky District
- Pavlovka, Inzhavinsky District, Tambov Oblast, a selo in Mikhaylovsky Selsoviet of Inzhavinsky District
- Pavlovka, Mordovsky District, Tambov Oblast, a selo in Leninsky Selsoviet of Mordovsky District
- Pavlovka, Petrovsky District, Tambov Oblast, a village in Petrovsky Selsoviet of Petrovsky District
- Pavlovka, Rzhaksinsky District, Tambov Oblast, a village in Lukinsky Selsoviet of Rzhaksinsky District
- Pavlovka, Sampursky District, Tambov Oblast, a village in Sampursky Selsoviet of Sampursky District
- Pavlovka, Abakumovsky Selsoviet, Tokaryovsky District, Tambov Oblast, a village in Abakumovsky Selsoviet of Tokaryovsky District
- Pavlovka, Abakumovsky Selsoviet, Tokaryovsky District, Tambov Oblast, a village in Abakumovsky Selsoviet of Tokaryovsky District
- Pavlovka, Poletayevsky Selsoviet, Tokaryovsky District, Tambov Oblast, a selo in Poletayevsky Selsoviet of Tokaryovsky District
- Pavlovka, Vasilyevsky Selsoviet, Tokaryovsky District, Tambov Oblast, a village in Vasilyevsky Selsoviet of Tokaryovsky District
- Pavlovka, Umyotsky District, Tambov Oblast, a village under the administrative jurisdiction of Umyotsky Settlement Council of Umyotsky District
- Pavlovka, Uvarovsky District, Tambov Oblast, a village in Pavlodarsky Selsoviet of Uvarovsky District

== Republic of Tatarstan ==
As of 2010, one rural locality in the Republic of Tatarstan bears this name:

- Pavlovka, Republic of Tatarstan, a village in Cheremshansky District

== Tula Oblast ==
As of 2010, ten rural localities in Tula Oblast bear this name:

- Pavlovka, Aleksinsky District, Tula Oblast, a village in Alexandrovsky Rural Okrug of Aleksinsky District
- Pavlovka, Bogoroditsky District, Tula Oblast, a village in Tovarkovsky Rural Okrug of Bogoroditsky District
- Pavlovka, Kamensky District, Tula Oblast, a village in Arkhangelsky Rural Okrug of Kamensky District
- Pavlovka, Kimovsky District, Tula Oblast, a village in Buchalsky Rural Okrug of Kimovsky District
- Pavlovka, Kurkinsky District, Tula Oblast, a village in Samarskaya Volost of Kurkinsky District
- Pavlovka, Odoyevsky District, Tula Oblast, a village in Okorokovskaya Rural Administration of Odoyevsky District
- Pavlovka, Plavsky District, Tula Oblast, a village in Novo-Nikolsky Rural Okrug of Plavsky District
- Pavlovka, Suvorovsky District, Tula Oblast, a village in Zhelobinskaya Rural Territory of Suvorovsky District
- Pavlovka, Tyoplo-Ogaryovsky District, Tula Oblast, a village in Severny Rural Okrug of Tyoplo-Ogaryovsky District
- Pavlovka, Venyovsky District, Tula Oblast, a village in Mordvessky Rural Okrug of Venyovsky District

== Tver Oblast ==
As of 2010, one rural locality in Tver Oblast bears this name:

- Pavlovka, Tver Oblast, a village in Vasilkovskoye Rural Settlement of Kuvshinovsky District

== Ulyanovsk Oblast ==
As of 2010, two inhabited localities in Ulyanovsk Oblast bear this name:

- Pavlovka, Pavlovsky District, Ulyanovsk Oblast, a work settlement under the administrative jurisdiction of Pavlovsky Settlement Okrug of Pavlovsky District
- Pavlovka, Baryshsky District, Ulyanovsk Oblast, a selo under the administrative jurisdiction of Zhadovsky Settlement Okrug of Baryshsky District

== Vladimir Oblast ==
As of 2010, two rural localities in Vladimir Oblast bear this name:

- Pavlovka, Kolchuginsky District, Vladimir Oblast, a village in Kolchuginsky District
- Pavlovka, Sudogodsky District, Vladimir Oblast, a village in Sudogodsky District

== Voronezh Oblast ==
As of 2010, four rural localities in Voronezh Oblast bear this name:

- Pavlovka, Bobrovsky District, Voronezh Oblast, a selo in Semeno-Alexandrovskoye Rural Settlement of Bobrovsky District
- Pavlovka, Paninsky District, Voronezh Oblast, a settlement in Krasnolimanskoye Rural Settlement of Paninsky District
- Pavlovka, Ramonsky District, Voronezh Oblast, a selo in Pavlovskoye Rural Settlement of Ramonsky District
- Pavlovka, Rossoshansky District, Voronezh Oblast, a khutor in Aleynikovskoye Rural Settlement of Rossoshansky District

== Yaroslavl Oblast ==
As of 2010, one rural locality in Yaroslavl Oblast bears this name:

- Pavlovka, Yaroslavl Oblast, a village in Pigalevsky Rural Okrug of Lyubimsky District
