= Pavlovsk, Russia =

Pavlovsk (Russian: Па́вловск) is the name of several inhabited localities in Russia.

Urban localities

- Pavlovsk, Saint Petersburg, a town in Pushkinsky District of the federal city of Saint Petersburg
- Pavlovsk, Voronezh Oblast, a town in Pavlovsky District of Voronezh Oblast

Rural localities

- Pavlovsk, Altai Krai, a selo in Pavlovsky Selsoviet of Pavlovsky District of Altai Krai
- Pavlovsk, Arkhangelsk Oblast, a selo in Pavlovsky Selsoviet of Vilegodsky District of Arkhangelsk Oblast
- Pavlovsk, Sakha Republic, a selo in Neryuktyayinsky Rural Okrug of Megino-Kangalassky District of the Sakha Republic
- Pavlovsk, Zabaykalsky Krai, a selo in Gazimuro-Zavodsky District of Zabaykalsky Krai

== See also ==
- Pavlovsk (disambiguation)
- Pavel
- Pavlov (disambiguation)
- Pavlovka (disambiguation)
- Pavlovsky (disambiguation)
- Pavlovo
- Novopavlovsk
- Petropavlovsk (disambiguation)
