= Pavlovo =

Name of several inhabited localities in Russia

Pavlovo (Russian: Павлово) is the name of several inhabited localities in Russia.

== Arkhangelsk Oblast ==
As of 2010, one rural locality in Arkhangelsk Oblast bears this name:

- Pavlovo, Arkhangelsk Oblast, a village under the administrative jurisdiction of the town of oblast significance of Novodvinsk

== Ivanovo Oblast ==
As of 2010, one rural locality in Ivanovo Oblast bears this name:

- Pavlovo, Ivanovo Oblast, a village in Yuryevetsky District

== Kaliningrad Oblast ==
As of 2010, one rural locality in Kaliningrad Oblast bears this name:

- Pavlovo, Kaliningrad Oblast, a settlement in Novostroyevsky Rural Okrug of Ozyorsky District

== Kaluga Oblast ==
As of 2010, three rural localities in Kaluga Oblast bear this name:

- Pavlovo, Borovsky District, Kaluga Oblast, a village in Borovsky District
- Pavlovo, Kozelsky District, Kaluga Oblast, a village in Kozelsky District
- Pavlovo, Mosalsky District, Kaluga Oblast, a village in Mosalsky District

== Kirov Oblast ==
As of 2010, two rural localities in Kirov Oblast bear this name:

- Pavlovo, Pizhansky District, Kirov Oblast, a village in Izhevsky Rural Okrug of Pizhansky District
- Pavlovo, Sanchursky District, Kirov Oblast, a village in Smetaninsky Rural Okrug of Sanchursky District

== Kostroma Oblast ==
As of 2010, four rural localities in Kostroma Oblast bear this name:

- Pavlovo, Galichsky District, Kostroma Oblast, a village in Orekhovskoye Settlement of Galichsky District
- Pavlovo, Kologrivsky District, Kostroma Oblast, a village in Sukhoverkhovskoye Settlement of Kologrivsky District
- Pavlovo, Parfenyevsky District, Kostroma Oblast, a village in Parfenyevskoye Settlement of Parfenyevsky District
- Pavlovo, Sharyinsky District, Kostroma Oblast, a village in Shangskoye Settlement of Sharyinsky District

== Leningrad Oblast ==
As of 2010, three inhabited localities in Leningrad Oblast bear this name.

Urban localities

- Pavlovo, Kirovsky District, Leningrad Oblast, an urban-type settlement in Pavlovskoye Settlement Municipal Formation of Kirovsky District

Rural localities

- Pavlovo, Kingiseppsky District, Leningrad Oblast, a village in Nezhnovskoye Settlement Municipal Formation of Kingiseppsky District
- Pavlovo, Vsevolozhsky District, Leningrad Oblast, a slobodka in Koltushskoye Settlement Municipal Formation of Vsevolozhsky District

== Nizhny Novgorod Oblast ==
As of 2010, four inhabited localities in Nizhny Novgorod Oblast bear this name.

Urban localities

- Pavlovo, Pavlovsky District, Nizhny Novgorod Oblast, a town in Pavlovsky District; administratively incorporated as a town of district significance

Rural localities

- Pavlovo, Semyonov, Nizhny Novgorod Oblast, a village in Ogibnovsky Selsoviet of the town of oblast significance of Semyonov
- Pavlovo, Koverninsky District, Nizhny Novgorod Oblast, a village in Gorevsky Selsoviet of Koverninsky District
- Pavlovo, Urensky District, Nizhny Novgorod Oblast, a village in Bolshepesochninsky Selsoviet of Urensky District

== Novgorod Oblast ==
As of 2010, three rural localities in Novgorod Oblast bear this name:

- Pavlovo, Krestetsky District, Novgorod Oblast, a khutor in Zaytsevskoye Settlement of Krestetsky District
- Pavlovo, Lyubytinsky District, Novgorod Oblast, a village under the administrative jurisdiction of the urban-type settlement of Lyubytino in Lyubytinsky District
- Pavlovo, Maryovsky District, Novgorod Oblast, a village in Molvotitskoye Settlement of Maryovsky District

== Novosibirsk Oblast ==
As of 2010, one rural locality in Novosibirsk Oblast bears this name:

- Pavlovo, Novosibirsk Oblast, a selo in Vengerovsky District

== Oryol Oblast ==
As of 2010, two rural localities in Oryol Oblast bear this name:

- Pavlovo, Trosnyansky District, Oryol Oblast, a village in Malakhovo-Slobodskoy Selsoviet of Trosnyansky District
- Pavlovo, Zalegoshchensky District, Oryol Oblast, a village in Lomovsky Selsoviet of Zalegoshchensky District

== Perm Krai ==
As of 2010, one rural locality in Perm Krai bears this name:

- Pavlovo, Perm Krai, a village in Ordinsky District

== Pskov Oblast ==
As of 2010, eleven rural localities in Pskov Oblast bear this name:

- Pavlovo (Kudeverskaya Rural Settlement), Bezhanitsky District, Pskov Oblast, a village in Bezhanitsky District; municipally, a part of Kudeverskaya Rural Settlement of that district
- Pavlovo (Lyushchikskaya Rural Settlement), Bezhanitsky District, Pskov Oblast, a village in Bezhanitsky District; municipally, a part of Lyushchikskaya Rural Settlement of that district
- Pavlovo, Loknyansky District, Pskov Oblast, a village in Loknyansky District
- Pavlovo, Ostrovsky District, Pskov Oblast, a village in Ostrovsky District
- Pavlovo (Cherskaya Rural Settlement), Palkinsky District, Pskov Oblast, a village in Palkinsky District; municipally, a part of Cherskaya Rural Settlement of that district
- Pavlovo (Kachanovskaya Rural Settlement), Palkinsky District, Pskov Oblast, a village in Palkinsky District; municipally, a part of Kachanovskaya Rural Settlement of that district
- Pavlovo, Pechorsky District, Pskov Oblast, a village in Pechorsky District
- Pavlovo, Pytalovsky District, Pskov Oblast, a village in Pytalovsky District
- Pavlovo, Sebezhsky District, Pskov Oblast, a village in Sebezhsky District
- Pavlovo, Strugo-Krasnensky District, Pskov Oblast, a village in Strugo-Krasnensky District
- Pavlovo, Velikoluksky District, Pskov Oblast, a village in Velikoluksky District

== Ryazan Oblast ==
As of 2010, one rural locality in Ryazan Oblast bears this name:

- Pavlovo, Ryazan Oblast, a village in Busayevsky Rural Okrug of Klepikovsky District

== Smolensk Oblast ==
As of 2010, six rural localities in Smolensk Oblast bear this name:

- Pavlovo, Gagarinsky District, Smolensk Oblast, a village in Samuylovskoye Rural Settlement of Gagarinsky District
- Pavlovo, Krasninsky District, Smolensk Oblast, a village in Pavlovskoye Rural Settlement of Krasninsky District
- Pavlovo, Pochinkovsky District, Smolensk Oblast, a village in Shmakovskoye Rural Settlement of Pochinkovsky District
- Pavlovo, Safonovsky District, Smolensk Oblast, a village in Staroselskoye Rural Settlement of Safonovsky District
- Pavlovo, Vyazemsky District, Smolensk Oblast, a village in Maslovskoye Rural Settlement of Vyazemsky District
- Pavlovo, Yartsevsky District, Smolensk Oblast, a village in Miropolskoye Rural Settlement of Yartsevsky District

== Tomsk Oblast ==
As of 2010, one rural locality in Tomsk Oblast bears this name:

- Pavlovo, Tomsk Oblast, a selo in Kargasoksky District

== Tula Oblast ==
As of 2010, two rural localities in Tula Oblast bear this name:

- Pavlovo, Aleksinsky District, Tula Oblast, a village in Michurinsky Rural Okrug of Aleksinsky District
- Pavlovo, Shchyokinsky District, Tula Oblast, a village in Nikolskaya Rural Administration of Shchyokinsky District

== Tver Oblast ==
As of 2010, six rural localities in Tver Oblast bear this name:

- Pavlovo, Kalyazinsky District, Tver Oblast, a village in Kalyazinsky District
- Pavlovo (Tolmachevskoye Rural Settlement), Likhoslavlsky District, Tver Oblast, a village in Likhoslavlsky District; municipally, a part of Tolmachevskoye Rural Settlement of that district
- Pavlovo (Stanskoye Rural Settlement), Likhoslavlsky District, Tver Oblast, a village in Likhoslavlsky District; municipally, a part of Stanskoye Rural Settlement of that district
- Pavlovo, Rameshkovsky District, Tver Oblast, a village in Rameshkovsky District
- Pavlovo, Udomelsky District, Tver Oblast, a village in Udomelsky District
- Pavlovo, Vyshnevolotsky District, Tver Oblast, a village in Vyshnevolotsky District

== Udmurt Republic ==
As of 2010, one rural locality in the Udmurt Republic bears this name:

- Pavlovo, Udmurt Republic, a village in Bulaysky Selsoviet of Uvinsky District

== Vladimir Oblast ==
As of 2010, one rural locality in Vladimir Oblast bears this name:

- Pavlovo, Vladimir Oblast, a village in Petushinsky District

== Vologda Oblast ==
As of 2010, eleven rural localities in Vologda Oblast bear this name:

- Pavlovo, Babushkinsky District, Vologda Oblast, a village in Bereznikovsky Selsoviet of Babushkinsky District
- Pavlovo, Belozersky District, Vologda Oblast, a village in Glushkovsky Selsoviet of Belozersky District
- Pavlovo, Cherepovetsky District, Vologda Oblast, a village in Yaganovsky Selsoviet of Cherepovetsky District
- Pavlovo, Pogossky Selsoviet, Kichmengsko-Gorodetsky District, Vologda Oblast, a village in Pogossky Selsoviet of Kichmengsko-Gorodetsky District
- Pavlovo, Sarayevsky Selsoviet, Kichmengsko-Gorodetsky District, Vologda Oblast, a village in Sarayevsky Selsoviet of Kichmengsko-Gorodetsky District
- Pavlovo, Nikolsky District, Vologda Oblast, a village in Argunovsky Selsoviet of Nikolsky District
- Pavlovo, Sokolsky District, Vologda Oblast, a village in Chuchkovsky Selsoviet of Sokolsky District
- Pavlovo, Vashkinsky District, Vologda Oblast, a village in Ukhtomsky Selsoviet of Vashkinsky District
- Pavlovo, Velikoustyugsky District, Vologda Oblast, a village in Orlovsky Selsoviet of Velikoustyugsky District
- Pavlovo, Nesvoysky Selsoviet, Vologodsky District, Vologda Oblast, a village in Nesvoysky Selsoviet of Vologodsky District
- Pavlovo, Novlensky Selsoviet, Vologodsky District, Vologda Oblast, a village in Novlensky Selsoviet of Vologodsky District

== Yaroslavl Oblast ==
As of 2010, eight rural localities in Yaroslavl Oblast bear this name:

- Pavlovo, Novoselsky Rural Okrug, Bolsheselsky District, Yaroslavl Oblast, a village in Novoselsky Rural Okrug of Bolsheselsky District
- Pavlovo, Varegovsky Rural Okrug, Bolsheselsky District, Yaroslavl Oblast, a village in Varegovsky Rural Okrug of Bolsheselsky District
- Pavlovo, Krasnooktyabrsky Rural Okrug, Borisoglebsky District, Yaroslavl Oblast, a selo in Krasnooktyabrsky Rural Okrug of Borisoglebsky District
- Pavlovo, Yakovtsevsky Rural Okrug, Borisoglebsky District, Yaroslavl Oblast, a village in Yakovtsevsky Rural Okrug of Borisoglebsky District
- Pavlovo, Gavrilov-Yamsky District, Yaroslavl Oblast, a village in Stavotinsky Rural Okrug of Gavrilov-Yamsky District
- Pavlovo, Myshkinsky District, Yaroslavl Oblast, a village in Rozhdestvensky Rural Okrug of Myshkinsky District
- Pavlovo, Nekouzsky District, Yaroslavl Oblast, a village in Rodionovsky Rural Okrug of Nekouzsky District
- Pavlovo, Nekrasovsky District, Yaroslavl Oblast, a village in Abbakumtsevsky Rural Okrug of Nekrasovsky District

== See also ==
- Pavel
- Pavlov (disambiguation)
- Pavlovka (disambiguation)
- Pavlovsk (disambiguation)
- Pavlovsky (disambiguation)
