= Pavlovskoye Urban Settlement =

Pavlovskoye Urban Settlement is the name of three municipal formations in Russia.

- Pavlovskoye Urban Settlement, a municipal formation corresponding to Pavlovskoye Settlement Municipal Formation, an administrative division of Kirovsky District of Leningrad Oblast
- Pavlovskoye Urban Settlement, a municipal formation which the work settlement of Pavlovsky and sixteen rural localities in Ochyorsky District of Perm Krai are incorporated as
- Pavlovskoye Urban Settlement, a municipal formation which Pavlovsky Settlement Okrug in Pavlovsky District of Ulyanovsk Oblast is incorporated as

== See also ==
- Pavlovsky (disambiguation)
- Pavlovsk Urban Settlement, an administrative division and a municipal formation which the town of Pavlovsk in Pavlovsky District of Voronezh Oblast is incorporated as
- Pavlovsk, Saint Petersburg, a municipal town in the federal city of St. Petersburg
