= Pavlovsky =

Pavlovsky (masculine), Pavlovskaya (feminine), or Pavlovskoye (neuter) may refer to:

- Pavlovsky (surname)

== Places ==
- Pavlovsky District, several districts in Russia
- Pavlovskoye Urban Settlement, several municipal urban settlements in Russia
- Pavlovsky (inhabited locality) (Pavlovskaya, Pavlovskoye), several inhabited localities in Russia
- Pavlovskaya, name of Kodiak, Alaska when it was founded in 1791 in Russian America

== Other ==
- Pavlovskoye Reservoir, a reservoir in the Republic of Bashkortostan, Russia

== See also ==
- Pavel
- Pavlov (disambiguation)
- Pavlovka (disambiguation)
- Pavlovsk (disambiguation)
- Pavlovo
