= Pavlovsky District =

Pavlovsky District is the name of several administrative and municipal districts in Russia. The district names are generally related to or derived from the male first name Pavel.

== Districts of the federal subjects ==
Federal subjects of Russia which have an entity called Pavlovsky District

- Pavlovsky District, Altai Krai, an administrative and municipal district of Altai Krai
- Pavlovsky District, Krasnodar Krai, an administrative and municipal district of Krasnodar Krai
- Pavlovsky District, Nizhny Novgorod Oblast, an administrative and municipal district of Nizhny Novgorod Oblast
- Pavlovsky District, Ulyanovsk Oblast, an administrative and municipal district of Ulyanovsk Oblast
- Pavlovsky District, Voronezh Oblast, an administrative and municipal district in Voronezh Oblast

== Historical districts ==
- Pavlovsky District, Leningrad Oblast (1938–1953), a former district of Leningrad Oblast (known as Slutsky District in 1938–1944)
- Pavlovsky District, Saint Petersburg, a former district of Saint Petersburg, merged into Pushkinsky District in 2005

== See also ==
- Pavlovsk (disambiguation)
- Pavlov (disambiguation)
