= Pavlovsk =

Pavlovsk may refer to:

== Russia ==
- Pavlovsk, Saint Petersburg, a town in a suburban Pushkinskiy District of Saint Petersburg, Russia
- Pavlovsk Urban Settlement, an administrative division and a municipal formation which the town of Pavlovsk in Pavlovsky District of Voronezh Oblast, Russia is incorporated as
- Pavlovsk, Russia, several inhabited localities in Russia

== Ukraine ==
- Pavlovsk, former name of the city of Mariupol, Ukraine

== See also ==
- Novopavlovsk
- Pavel
- Pavlov (disambiguation)
- Pavlovka (disambiguation)
- Pavlovo
- Pavlovsky (disambiguation)
- Petropavlovsk (disambiguation)
