= Pavlovskoye, Ust-Kubinsky District, Vologda Oblast =

Pavlovskoye Павловское
- Village
- Location within Vologda Oblast Location within Russia
- Coordinates: 59°46′N 39°52′E
- Country: Russia
- Region: Vologda Oblast
- District: Ust-Kubinsky District
- Time zone: UTC+3:00

Pavlovskoye (Russian: Павловское) is a rural locality (a village) in Vysokovskoye Rural Settlement, Ust-Kubinsky District, Vologda Oblast, Russia. The population was 15 as of 2002.

== Geography ==
The distance to Ustye is 27 km, to Vysokoye is 17 km. Novoye is the nearest rural locality.
