= Pavlovsk, Zabaykalsky Krai =

Pavlovsk Павловск
- Selo
- Location within Zabaykalsky Krai Location within Russia
- Coordinates: 51°30′N 118°19′E
- Country: Russia
- Region: Zabaykalsky Krai
- District: Gazimuro-Zavodsky District
- Time zone: UTC+9:00

Pavlovsk (Russian: Павловск) is a rural locality (a selo) in Gazimuro-Zavodsky District, Zabaykalsky Krai, Russia. Population: 118 (2021 census); 136 (2010 census); 138 (2002 census); There is 1 street in this selo.

== Geography ==
This rural locality is located 5 km from Gazimursky Zavod (the district's administrative centre), 339 km from Chita (capital of Zabaykalsky Krai) and 5,606 km from Moscow. Korabl is the nearest rural locality.
