= Pavlovskoye, Kovrovsky District, Vladimir Oblast =

Pavlovskoye Павловское
- Selo
- Location within Vladimir Oblast Location within Russia
- Coordinates: 56°13′N 41°28′E
- Country: Russia
- Region: Vladimir Oblast
- District: Kovrovsky District
- Time zone: UTC+3:00

Pavlovskoye (Russian: Павловское) is a rural locality (a selo) in Ivanovskoye Rural Settlement, Kovrovsky District, Vladimir Oblast, Russia. The population was 447 as of 2010. There are 9 streets.

== Geography ==
Pavlovskoye is located 28 km southeast of Kovrov (the district's administrative centre) by road. Ivanovo is the nearest rural locality.
