= Pavlovskoye, Suzdalsky District, Vladimir Oblast =

Pavlovskoye Павловское
- Selo
- Location within Vladimir Oblast Location within Russia
- Coordinates: 56°19′N 40°28′E
- Country: Russia
- Region: Vladimir Oblast
- District: Suzdalsky District
- Time zone: UTC+3:00

Pavlovskoye (Russian: Павловское) is a rural locality (a selo) and the administrative center of Pavlovskoye Rural Settlement, Suzdalsky District, Vladimir Oblast, Russia. The population was 1,412 as of 2010. There are 21 streets.

== Geography ==
Pavlovskoye is located 17 km north from Vladimir, 11 km south of Suzdal (the district's administrative centre) by road. Semyonovskoye-Krasnoye is the nearest rural locality.
