= Pavlovskoye, Velikoustyugsky District, Vologda Oblast =

Pavlovskoye Павловское
- Village
- Location within Vologda Oblast Location within Russia
- Coordinates: 60°35′N 45°37′E
- Country: Russia
- Region: Vologda Oblast
- District: Velikoustyugsky District
- Time zone: UTC+3:00
- Website: wrappertube.org

Pavlovskoye (Russian: Павловское) is a rural locality (a village) in Opokskoye Rural Settlement, Velikoustyugsky District, Vologda Oblast, Russia. The population was 5 as of 2002.

== Geography ==
Pavlovskoye is located 54 km southwest of Veliky Ustyug (the district's administrative centre) by road. Pozharishche is the nearest rural locality.
