= Pavlovo, Vladimir Oblast =

Russian rural locality

Pavlovo Павлово
- Village
- Location within Vladimir Oblast Location within Russia
- Coordinates: 56°07′N 39°40′E
- Country: Russia
- Region: Vladimir Oblast
- District: Petushinsky District
- Time zone: UTC+3:00

Pavlovo (Russian: Павлово) is a rural locality (a village) in Pekshinskoye Rural Settlement, Petushinsky District, Vladimir Oblast, Russia. The population was 1 as of 2010.

== Geography ==
Pavlovo is located 46 km northeast of Petushki (the district's administrative centre) by road. Aleksino is the nearest rural locality.
