= Pavlovskaya, Yavengsky Selsoviet, Vozhegodsky District, Vologda Oblast =

Pavlovskaya Павловская
- Village
- Location within Vologda Oblast Location within Russia
- Coordinates: 60°35′N 40°03′E
- Country: Russia
- Region: Vologda Oblast
- District: Vozhegodsky District
- Time zone: UTC+3:00

Pavlovskaya (Russian: Павловская) is a rural locality (a village) in Yavengskoye Rural Settlement, Vozhegodsky District, Vologda Oblast, Russia. The population was 2 as of 2002.

== Geography ==
The distance to Vozhega is 25 km, to Baza is 5 km. Kozlovo, Turabovskaya, Bolshaya Nazarovskaya are the nearest rural localities.
