= Pavlovskaya, Vladimir Oblast =

Pavlovskaya Павловская
- Village
- Location within Vladimir Oblast Location within Russia
- Coordinates: 56°02′N 40°29′E
- Country: Russia
- Region: Vladimir Oblast
- District: Sudogodsky District
- Time zone: UTC+3:00

Pavlovskaya (Russian: Павловская) is a rural locality (a village) in Vyatkinskoye Rural Settlement, Sudogodsky District, Vladimir Oblast, Russia. The population was 2 as of 2010.

== Geography ==
Pavlovskaya is located 32 km northwest of Sudogda (the district's administrative centre) by road. Proskurinskaya is the nearest rural locality.
