= Pavlovka, Perm Krai =

Pavlovka Павловка
- Selo
- Location within Perm Krai Location within Russia
- Coordinates: 56°29′N 56°12′E
- Country: Russia
- Region: Perm Krai
- District: Chernushinsky District
- Time zone: UTC+5:00

Pavlovka (Russian: Павловка) is a rural locality (a selo) and the administrative center of Pavlovskoye Rural Settlement, Chernushinsky District, Perm Krai, Russia. The population was 673 as of 2010. There are 11 streets.

== Geography ==
Pavlovka is located 11 km east of Chernushka (the district's administrative centre) by road. Bolshoy Ulyk is the nearest rural locality.
