= Pavlovo, Nikolsky District, Vologda Oblast =

Pavlovo Павлово
- Village
- Location within Vologda Oblast Location within Russia
- Coordinates: 59°50′N 45°04′E
- Country: Russia
- Region: Vologda Oblast
- District: Nikolsky District
- Time zone: UTC+3:00

Pavlovo (Russian: Павлово) is a rural locality (a village) in Argunovskoye Rural Settlement, Nikolsky District, Vologda Oblast, Russia. The population was 78 as of 2002.

== Geography ==
Pavlovo is located 47 km northwest of Nikolsk (the district's administrative centre) by road. Ilyinskoye is the nearest rural locality.
