= Pavlovsky, Nekhayevsky District, Volgograd Oblast =

Pavlovsky Павловский
- Khutor
- Location within Volgograd Oblast Location within Russia
- Coordinates: 50°23′N 41°47′E
- Country: Russia
- Region: Volgograd Oblast
- District: Nekhayevsky District
- Time zone: UTC+4:00

Pavlovsky (Russian: Павловский) is a rural locality (a khutor) in Nekhayevskoye Rural Settlement, Nekhayevsky District, Volgograd Oblast, Russia. The population was 294 as of 2010. There are 2 streets.

== Geography ==
Pavlovsky is located on the right bank of the Tishanka River, 5 km southeast of Nekhayevskaya (the district's administrative centre) by road. Nekhayevskaya is the nearest rural locality.
