= Pavlovka, Seryshevsky District, Amur Oblast =

Pavlovka Павловка
- Selo
- Location within Amur Oblast Location within Russia
- Coordinates: 51°21′N 128°40′E
- Country: Russia
- Region: Amur Oblast
- District: Seryshevsky District
- Time zone: UTC+9:00

Pavlovka (Russian: Павловка) is a rural locality (a selo) in Lermontovsky Selsoviet of Seryshevsky District, Amur Oblast, Russia. The population was 65 as of 2018. There are 3 streets.

== Geography ==
Pavlovka is located 46 km northeast of Seryshevo (the district's administrative centre) by road. Lermontovo is the nearest rural locality.
