= Pavlovka, Uglovsky District, Altai Krai =

Pavlovka Павловка
- Selo
- Location within Altai Krai Location within Russia
- Coordinates: 51°23′N 79°47′E
- Country: Russia
- Region: Altai Krai
- District: Uglovsky District
- Time zone: UTC+7:00

Pavlovka (Russian: Павловка) is a rural locality (a selo) and the administrative center of Pavlovsky Selsoviet, Uglovsky District, Altai Krai, Russia. The population was 1,000 as of 2013. It was founded in 1907. There are 13 streets.

== Geography ==
Pavlovka is located 33 km west of Uglovskoye (the district's administrative centre) by road. Bor-Kosobulat is the nearest rural locality.
