= Pavlovskoye, Yuryev-Polsky District, Vladimir Oblast =

Pavlovskoye Павловское
- Selo
- Location within Vladimir Oblast Location within Russia
- Coordinates: 56°16′N 40°00′E
- Country: Russia
- Region: Vladimir Oblast
- District: Yuryev-Polsky District
- Time zone: UTC+3:00

Pavlovskoye (Russian: Павловское) is a rural locality (a selo) in Nebylovskoye Rural Settlement, Yuryev-Polsky District, Vladimir Oblast, Russia. The population was 9 as of 2010. There are 5 streets.

== Geography ==
Pavlovskoye is located on the Kuftiga River, 40 km southeast of Yuryev-Polsky (the district's administrative centre) by road. Bukholovo is the nearest rural locality.

== Paleontology ==
Fossil of paguroid hermit crab Mutotylaspis was found in the marine Albian (mid-Cretaceous) deposits, on the right bank of the river Kuftiga, near Pavlovskoye.
