= Pavlovskaya, Nizhneslobodsky Selsoviet, Vozhegodsky District, Vologda Oblast =

Pavlovskaya Павловская
- Village
- Location within Vologda Oblast Location within Russia
- Coordinates: 60°30′43″N 40°55′24″E
- Country: Russia
- Region: Vologda Oblast
- District: Vozhegodsky District
- Time zone: UTC+3:00

Pavlovskaya (Russian: Павловская) is a rural locality (a village) in Nizhneslobodskoye Rural Settlement, Vozhegodsky District, Vologda Oblast, Russia. The population was 4 as of 2002.

== Geography ==
The distance to Vozhega is 50 km, to Derevenka is 5.5 km. Olyushinskaya, Yeskinskaya, Guryevskaya are the nearest rural localities.
