= Pavlovka, Belogorsky District, Amur Oblast =

Pavlovka Павловка
- Selo
- Location within Amur Oblast Location within Russia
- Coordinates: 50°52′N 128°43′E
- Country: Russia
- Region: Amur Oblast
- District: Belogorsky District
- Time zone: UTC+9:00

Pavlovka (Russian: Павловка) is a rural locality (a selo) in Vasilyevsky Selsoviet of Belogorsky District, Amur Oblast, Russia. The population was 202 as of 2018. There are 2 streets.

== Geography ==
Pavlovka is located on the left bank of the Tom River, 19 km southeast of Belogorsk (the district's administrative centre) by road. Vasilyevka is the nearest rural locality.
