= Petropavlovsk =

Petropavlovsk (Russian: Петропавловск, lit. 'city of Peter and Paul') may refer to:

== Places ==
- Petropavlovsk, Kazakhstan, a city in the North Province of Kazakhstan
- Petropavlovsk-Kamchatsky, a city in Kamchatka Krai, informally and formerly officially known simply as Petropavlovsk.
- Petropavlovsk, Chuvash Republic, a selo (village) in Magarinskoye Rural Settlement of Shumerlinsky District in the Chuvash Republic
- Petropavlovsk, Bolshesosnovsky District, Perm Krai, a selo in Bolshesosnovsky District of Perm Krai
- Petropavlovsk, Oktyabrsky District, Perm Krai, a selo in Oktyabrsky District of Perm Krai
- Petropavlovsk, Sakha Republic, a selo in Petropavlovsky Rural Okrug of Ust-Maysky District in the Sakha Republic

=== Alternative names ===
- Petropavlovsk South, alternative name of Petropavlovsk Airport in Kazakhstan
- Petropavlovsk, alternative name of Petropavlovskoye, a selo in Petropavlovskoye Settlement of Pavinsky District in Kostroma Oblast; 59°6′N 46°20′E

== Ships ==
- Russian ironclad Petropavlovsk, launched in 1865.
- Russian battleship Petropavlovsk (1894), Imperial Russia (1897–1904)
- Russian battleship Petropavlovsk (1911), a Gangut-class battleship in the Baltic Fleet (1914–1953)
  - Petropavlovsk resolution, a list of demands by the crew of the battleship during the Kronstadt rebellion
- Former German cruiser Lützow (1939), renamed Petropavlovsk after her sale to the Soviet Union in 1940
- Soviet cruiser Kaganovich, renamed Petropavlovsk in 1957

== Other ==
- Petropavlovsk plc, a mining company listed on the London Stock Exchange
- Siege of Petropavlovsk, a battle of the Crimean War at Petropavlovsk-Kamchatsky

== See also ==
- Petropavlovsky (disambiguation)
