= Pavlovka, Bayevsky District, Altai Krai =

Pavlovka Павловка
- Selo
- Location within Altai Krai Location within Russia
- Coordinates: 53°13′N 80°22′E
- Country: Russia
- Region: Altai Krai
- District: Bayevsky District
- Time zone: UTC+7:00

Pavlovka (Russian: Павловка) is a rural locality (a selo) in Bayevsky District, Altai Krai, Russia. The population was 63 as of 2013. There are 2 streets.

== Geography ==
Pavlovka is located 29 km west of Bayevo (the district's administrative centre) by road. Alexandrovka is the nearest rural locality.
