= Pavlovka, Slavgorod, Altai Krai =

Pavlovka Павловка
- Selo
- Location within Altai Krai Location within Russia
- Coordinates: 52°56′N 78°23′E
- Country: Russia
- Region: Altai Krai
- District: Slavgorod
- Time zone: UTC+7:00

Pavlovka (Russian: Павловка) is a rural locality (a selo) in Slavgorod, Altai Krai, Russia. The population was 135 as of 2013. There are 4 streets.
