= Pavlovka, Nurimanovsky District, Republic of Bashkortostan =

Pavlovka Павловка
- Selo
- Location within Bashkortostan Location within Russia
- Coordinates: 55°25′N 56°33′E
- Country: Russia
- Region: Bashkortostan
- District: Nurimanovsky District
- Time zone: UTC+5:00

Pavlovka (Russian: Павловка) is a rural locality (a selo) and the administrative centre of Pavlovsky Selsoviet, Nurimanovsky District, Bashkortostan, Russia. The population was 4,143 as of 2010. There are 44 streets.

== Geography ==
Pavlovka is located 40 km north of Krasnaya Gorka (the district's administrative centre) by road. Verkhnekirovsky is the nearest rural locality.
