= Petropavlovsk, Bolshesosnovsky District, Perm Krai =

Petropavlovsk Петропавловск
- Selo
- Location within Perm Krai Location within Russia
- Coordinates: 57°39′19″N 54°17′20″E
- Country: Russia
- Region: Perm Krai
- District: Bolshesosnovsky District
- Time zone: UTC+5:00

Petropavlovsk (Russian: Петропавловск) is a rural locality (a selo) and the administrative center of Petropavlovskoye Rural Settlement, Bolshesosnovsky District, Perm Krai, Russia. The population was 588 as of 2010. There are 8 streets.

== Geography ==
Petropavlovsk is located 20 km west of Bolshaya Sosnova (the district's administrative centre) by road. Bolshiye Kizeli is the nearest rural locality.
