= Pavlovsky (surname) =

Pavlovsky (Павловский, also spelled as Pavlovskiy) is a Russian-language surname. The Ukrainian-language variant is Павловський, Pavlovskiy. Notable people with the surname include:

- Aleksandr Pavlovsky (1936–1977), Soviet Olympic fencer
- Andrew Pavlovsky, Russian artist
- Yevgeny Pavlovsky (1884–1965), Soviet zoologist
- Gleb Pavlovsky, Russian political scientist
- Isaac Yakovlevich Pavlovsky (1853–1924), Russian revolutionary
- Mykhailo Pavlovskiy (1942–2004), Ukrainian scientist and politician
- Volodymyr Pavlovskiy, Ukrainian rower
