= Pavlovskoye, Gryazovetsky District, Vologda Oblast =

Pavlovskoye Павловское
- Village
- Location within Vologda Oblast Location within Russia
- Coordinates: 58°53′N 40°44′E
- Country: Russia
- Region: Vologda Oblast
- District: Gryazovetsky District
- Time zone: UTC+3:00

Pavlovskoye (Russian: Павловское) is a rural locality (a village) in Sidorovskoye Rural Settlement, Gryazovetsky District, Vologda Oblast, Russia. The population was 1 as of 2002.

== Geography ==
Pavlovskoye is located 35 km east of Gryazovets (the district's administrative centre) by road. Senga is the nearest rural locality.
