= Pavlovka, Gafuriysky District, Republic of Bashkortostan =

Pavlovka Павловка
- Village
- Location within Bashkortostan Location within Russia
- Coordinates: 54°02′N 56°25′E
- Country: Russia
- Region: Bashkortostan
- District: Gafuriysky District
- Time zone: UTC+5:00

Pavlovka (Russian: Павловка) is a rural locality (a village) in Tabynsky Selsoviet, Gafuriysky District, Bashkortostan, Russia. The population was 57 as of 2010. There are 3 streets.

== Geography ==
Pavlovka is located 20 km north of Krasnousolsky (the district's administrative centre) by road. Akhmetka is the nearest rural locality.
