= Pavlovskoye, Sheksninsky District, Vologda Oblast =

Pavlovskoye Павловское
- Village
- Location within Vologda Oblast Location within Russia
- Coordinates: 59°24′N 38°46′E
- Country: Russia
- Region: Vologda Oblast
- District: Sheksninsky District
- Time zone: UTC+3:00

Pavlovskoye (Russian: Павловское) is a rural locality (a village) in Sizemskoye Rural Settlement, Sheksninsky District, Vologda Oblast, Russia. The population was 20 as of 2002.

== Geography ==
Pavlovskoye is located 38 km north of Sheksna (the district's administrative centre) by road. Popovskoye is the nearest rural locality.
