= Pavlovskoye, Cherepovetsky District, Vologda Oblast =

Pavlovskoye Павловское
- Village
- Location within Vologda Oblast Location within Russia
- Coordinates: 59°29′N 38°01′E
- Country: Russia
- Region: Vologda Oblast
- District: Cherepovetsky District
- Time zone: UTC+3:00

Pavlovskoye (Russian: Павловское) is a rural locality (a village) in Voskresenskoye Rural Settlement, Cherepovetsky District, Vologda Oblast, Russia. The population was 7 as of 2002.

== Geography ==
Pavlovskoye is located 51 km (32 mi) northeast of Cherepovets (the district's administrative centre) by road. Vysokaya is the nearest rural locality.
