= Pavlovo, Cherepovetsky District, Vologda Oblast =

Pavlovo Павлово
- Village
- Location within Vologda Oblast Location within Russia
- Coordinates: 59°24′N 38°08′E
- Country: Russia
- Region: Vologda Oblast
- District: Cherepovetsky District
- Time zone: UTC+3:00

Pavlovo (Russian: Павлово) is a rural locality (a village) in Yaganovskoye Rural Settlement, Cherepovetsky District, Vologda Oblast, Russia. The population was 35 as of 2002.

== Geography ==
Pavlovo is located 43 km (27 mi) north of Cherepovets (the district's administrative centre) by road. Gorka is the nearest rural locality.
