= Pavlovka, Kolchuginsky District, Vladimir Oblast =

Pavlovka Павловка
- Village
- Location within Vladimir Oblast Location within Russia
- Coordinates: 56°12′N 39°40′E
- Country: Russia
- Region: Vladimir Oblast
- District: Kolchuginsky District
- Time zone: UTC+3:00

Pavlovka (Russian: Павловка) is a rural locality (a village) in Razdolyevskoye Rural Settlement, Kolchuginsky District, Vladimir Oblast, Russia. The population was 338 as of 2010. There are 3 streets.

== Geography ==
Pavlovka is located 24 km southeast of Kolchugino (the district's administrative centre) by road. Gorbatovka is the nearest rural locality.
