= Pavlovka, Kuyurgazinsky District, Republic of Bashkortostan =

Pavlovka Павловка
- Village
- Location within Bashkortostan Location within Russia
- Coordinates: 52°40′N 56°05′E
- Country: Russia
- Region: Bashkortostan
- District: Kuyurgazinsky District
- Time zone: UTC+5:00

Pavlovka (Russian: Павловка) is a rural locality (a village) in Krivle-Ilyushkinsky Selsoviet, Kuyurgazinsky District, Bashkortostan, Russia. The population was 235 as of 2010. There are 2 streets.

== Geography ==
Pavlovka is located 25 km east of Yermolayevo (the district's administrative centre) by road. Arslano-Amekachevo is the nearest rural locality.
