= Pavlovo, Vashkinsky District, Vologda Oblast =

Pavlovo Павлово
- Village
- Location within Vologda Oblast Location within Russia
- Coordinates: 60°12′N 38°14′E
- Country: Russia
- Region: Vologda Oblast
- District: Vashkinsky District
- Time zone: UTC+3:00

Pavlovo (Russian: Павлово) is a rural locality (a village) in Lipinoborskoye Rural Settlement, Vashkinsky District, Vologda Oblast, Russia. The population was 5 as of 2002.

== Geography ==
Pavlovo is located 19 km southeast of Lipin Bor (the district's administrative centre) by road. Chisti is the nearest rural locality.
