= Pavlovskaya, Krasnodar Krai =

Pavlovskaya Павловская
- Stanitsa
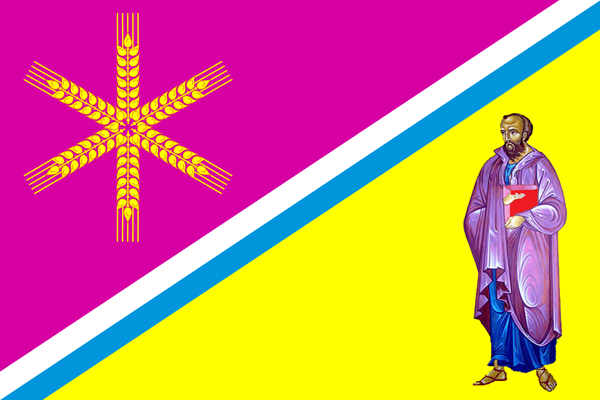
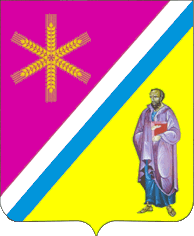
- Flag Coat of arms
- Interactive map of Pavlovskaya
- Location of Pavlovskaya Pavlovskaya (Krasnodar Krai)
- Coordinates: 46°09′N 39°48′E
- Country: Russia
- Federal subject: Krasnodar Krai
- Administrative district: Pavlovsky District
- Founded: 1822
- Elevation: 39 m (128 ft)

Population (2010 Census)
  - Total: 31,327
  - Estimate (2021): 29,514 (−5.8%)

Administrative status
  - Capital of: Pavlovsky District
- Time zone: UTC+3 (MSK)
- Postal code: 352040–352045
- OKTMO ID: 03639428101

Pavlovskaya (Russian: Павловская) is a rural locality (a stanitsa) and the administrative center of Pavlovsky District of Krasnodar Krai, Russia. Population: 31,133(2020), 31,327 (2010 census); 30,736 (2002 census); 28,744 (1989 Soviet census).
