= Pavlovka, Fatezhsky District, Kursk Oblast =

Rural locality in Kursk Oblast, Russia

Pavlovka Павловка
- Khutor
- Interactive map of Pavlovka
- Location of Pavlovka Pavlovka (Kursk Oblast)
- Coordinates: 52°05′13″N 35°44′52″E
- Country: Russia
- Federal subject: Kursk Oblast
- Administrative district: Fatezhsky District
- SelsovietSelsoviet: Soldatsky

Population (2010 Census)
  - Total: 3
  - Estimate (2010): 3 (0%)

Municipal status
  - Municipal district: Fatezhsky Municipal District
  - Rural settlement: Soldatsky Selsoviet Rural Settlement
- Time zone: UTC+3 (MSK)
- Postal code: 307106
- Dialing code: +7 47144
- OKTMO ID: 38644468131
- Website: мосолдатский.рф

Pavlovka (Russian: Павловка) is a rural locality (a khutor) in Soldatsky Selsoviet Rural Settlement, Fatezhsky District, Kursk Oblast, Russia. The population as of 2010 is 3.

== Geography ==
The khutor is located on the Usozha River (a left tributary of the Svapa in the basin of the Seym), 96 km from the Russia–Ukraine border, 49 km north-west of Kursk, 7.5 km west of the district center – the town Fatezh, 1.5 km from the selsoviet center – Soldatskoye.

=== Climate ===
Pavlovka has a warm-summer humid continental climate (Dfb in the Köppen climate classification).

== Transport ==
Pavlovka is located 5 km from the federal route M-2 Crimea Highway as part of the European route E105, 2 km from the road of regional importance 38K-038 (Fatezh – Dmitriyev), 0.5 km from the road of intermunicipal significance 38Н-679 (38K-038 – Soldatskoye – Shuklino), 27.5 km from the nearest railway halt 29 km (railway line Arbuzovo – Luzhki-Orlovskiye).

The rural locality is situated 52 km from Kursk Vostochny Airport, 169 km from Belgorod International Airport and 241 km from Voronezh Peter the Great Airport.
