= Pavlovka, Loktevsky District, Altai Krai =

Pavlovka Павловка
- Selo
- Location within Altai Krai Location within Russia
- Coordinates: 51°09′N 81°42′E
- Country: Russia
- Region: Altai Krai
- District: Loktevsky District
- Time zone: UTC+7:00

Pavlovka (Russian: Павловка) is a rural locality (a selo) in Alexandrovsky Selsoviet, Loktevsky District, Altai Krai, Russia. The population was 141 as of 2013. There are 2 streets.

== Geography ==
Pavlovka is located on the Aley River, 36 km northeast of Gornyak (the district's administrative centre) by road. Alexandrovka is the nearest rural locality.
