= Pavlovka, Pavlovsky District, Ulyanovsk Oblast =

Pavlovka Павловка
- Work settlement
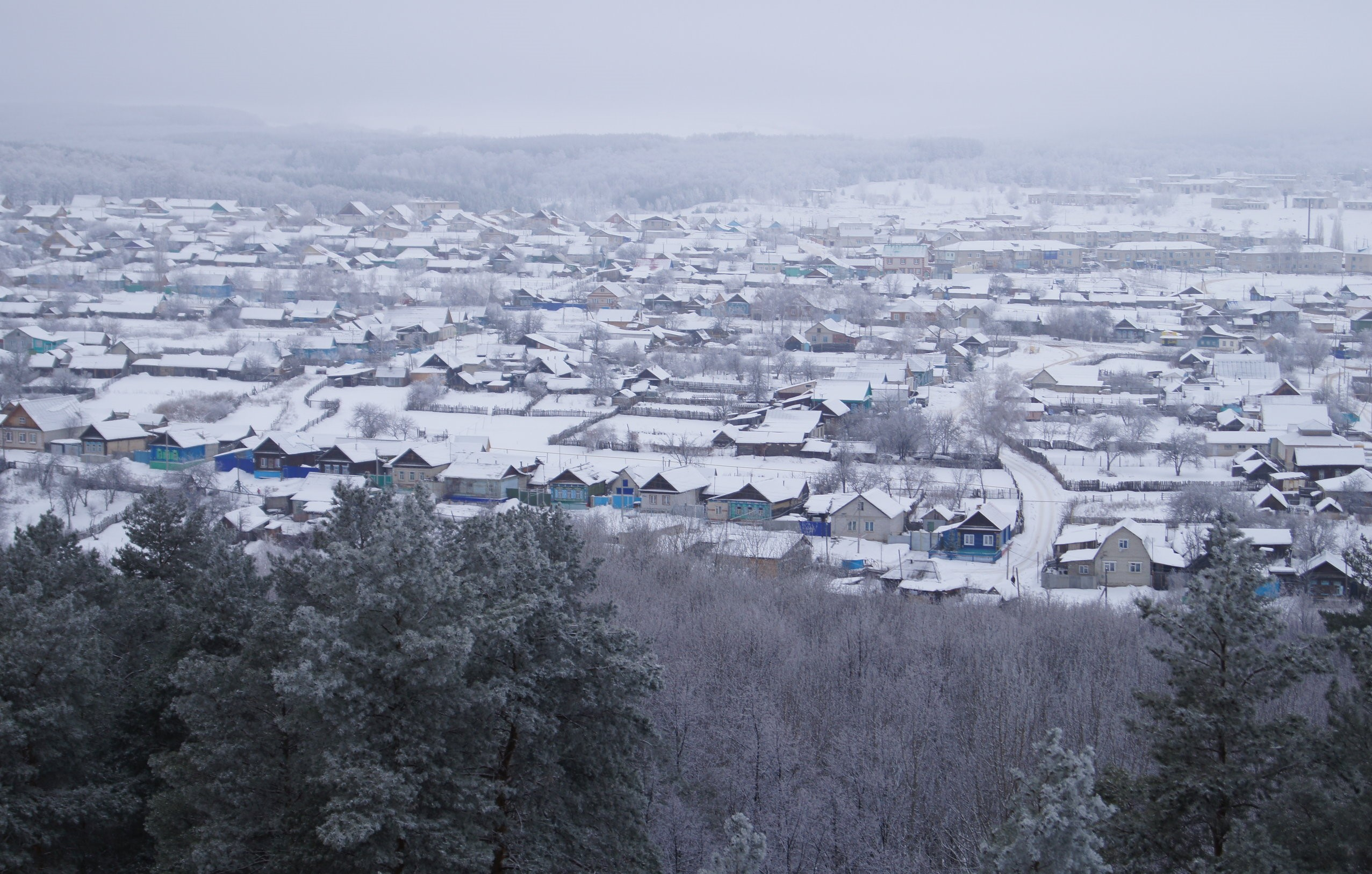
- Panorama of Pavlovka

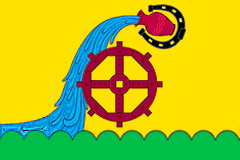
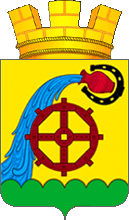
- Flag Coat of arms
- Interactive map of Pavlovka
- Location of Pavlovka Pavlovka (Ulyanovsk Oblast)
- Coordinates: 52°41′10″N 47°08′15″E
- Country: Russia
- Federal subject: Ulyanovsk Oblast
- Administrative district: Pavlovsky District
- Founded: 1695
- Urban-type settlement status since: 1978

Population (2010 Census)
  - Total: 5,626
  - Estimate (2021): 4,951 (−12%)

Administrative status
  - Capital of: Pavlovsky District
- Time zone: UTC+4 (UTC+04:00)
- Postal code: 433970
- Dialing code: +7 84248
- OKTMO ID: 73632151051

Pavlovka (Russian: Па́вловка) is an urban locality (a work settlement) and the administrative center of Pavlovsky District of Ulyanovsk Oblast, Russia. Population: 5,626 (2010 census); 5,930 (2002 census); 5,730 (1989 Soviet census).

Its history began in 1695 when land in the area was granted to settlers from Penza. The settlement was called Izbalyk (Избалык, after the Izbalyk River) or Dmitriyevskoye (Дмитриевское). In the second half of the 19th century, its name changed to Pavlovka. Urban-type settlement status was granted to it in 1978.
