= Pavlovsky District, Krasnodar Krai =

Pavlovsky District Павловский район (Russian)
- District
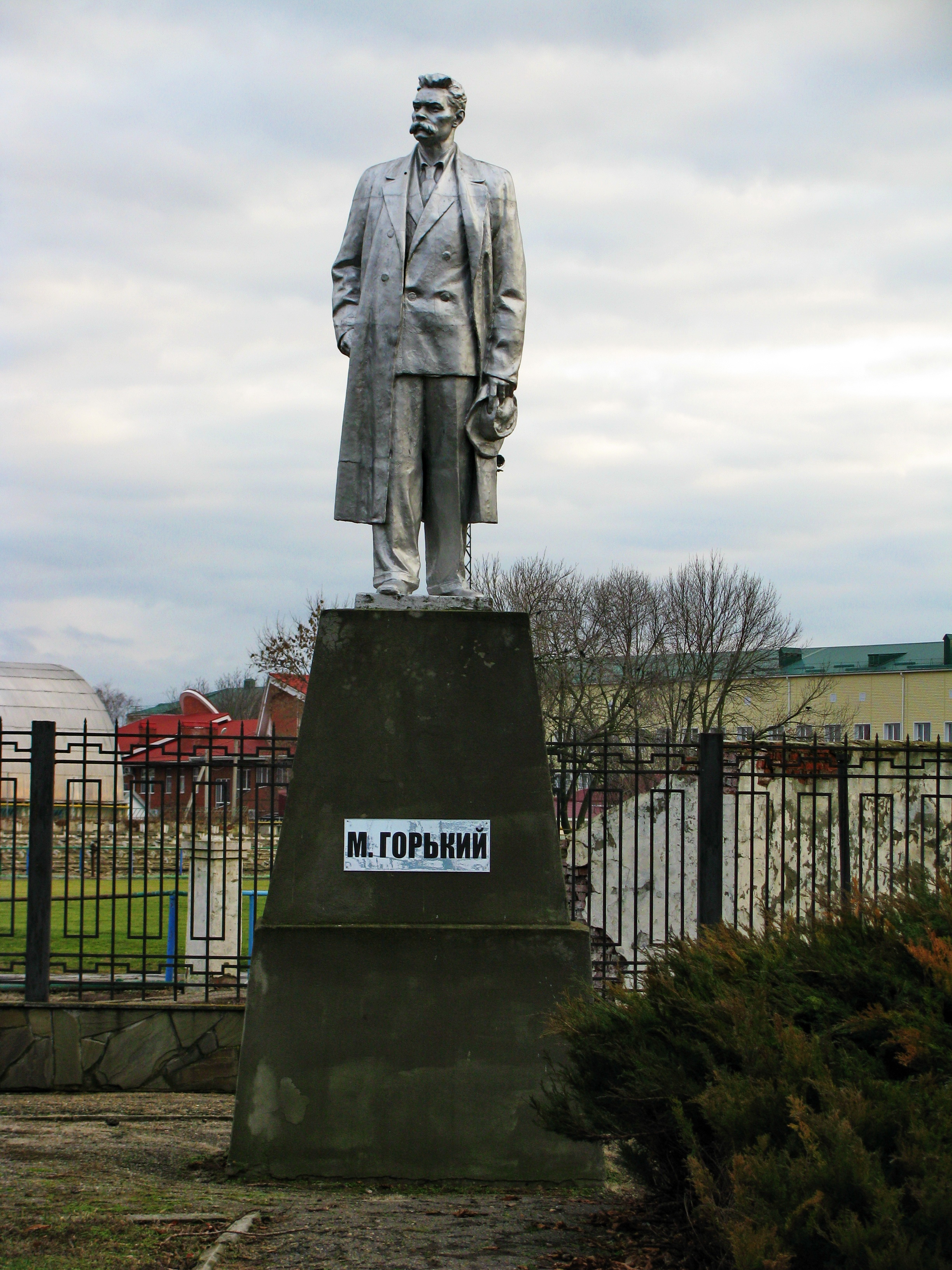
- Monument to Mexim Gorky, Village Pavlovsk, Pavlovsky District

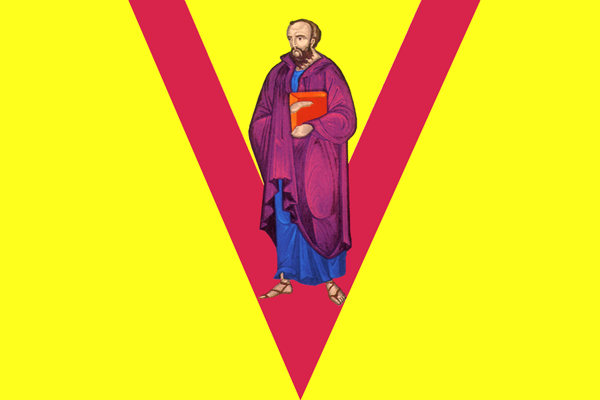
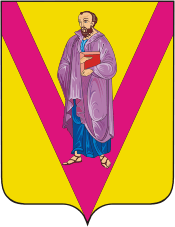
- Flag Coat of arms
- Location of Pavlovsky District in Krasnodar Krai
- Coordinates: 46°08′22″N 39°47′19″E
- Country: Russia
- Federal subject: Krasnodar Krai
- Established: 1924
- Administrative center: Pavlovskaya

Area
  - Total: 1,788.8 km^{2} (690.7 sq mi)

Population (2010 Census)
  - Total: 67,521
  - Density: 37.747/km^{2} (97.763/sq mi)
  - Urban: 0%
  - Rural: 100%

Administrative structure
  - Administrative divisions: 8 Stanitsa okrugs, 3 Rural okrugs
  - Inhabited localities: 29 rural localities

Municipal structure
  - Municipally incorporated as: Pavlovsky Municipal District
  - Municipal divisions: 0 urban settlements, 11 rural settlements
- Time zone: UTC+3 (MSK)
- OKTMO ID: 03639000
- Website: http://pavl23.ru/

Pavlovsky District (Russian: Па́вловский райо́н) is an administrative district (raion), one of the thirty-eight in Krasnodar Krai, Russia. As a municipal division, it is incorporated as Pavlovsky Municipal District. It is located in the north of the krai. The area of the district is 1,788.8 square kilometers (690.7 sq mi). Its administrative center is the rural locality (a stanitsa) of Pavlovskaya. Population: 67,521 (2010 census); 68,470 (2002 census); 63,949 (1989 Soviet census). The population of Pavlovskaya accounts for 46.4% of the district's total population.
