= Pavlovsk, Voronezh Oblast =

Town in Voronezh Oblast, Russia

Pavlovsk Павловск
- Town
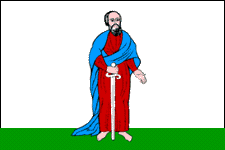
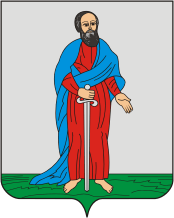
- Flag Coat of arms
- Interactive map of Pavlovsk
- Location of Pavlovsk Pavlovsk (Voronezh Oblast)
- Coordinates: 50°27′28″N 40°06′29″E
- Country: Russia
- Federal subject: Voronezh Oblast
- Administrative district: Pavlovsky District
- Urban settlementSelsoviet: Pavlovsk
- Founded: 1709
- Elevation: 83 m (272 ft)

Population (2010 Census)
  - Total: 25,126
  - Estimate (2025): 21,409 (−14.8%)

Administrative status
  - Capital of: Pavlovsky District, Pavlovsk Urban Settlement

Municipal status
  - Municipal district: Pavlovsky Municipal District
  - Urban settlement: Pavlovsk Urban Settlement
  - Capital of: Pavlovsky Municipal District, Pavlovsk Urban Settlement
- Time zone: UTC+3 (MSK)
- Postal codes: 396420–396422, 396424, 396459
- OKTMO ID: 20633101001
- Website: pavlovskadmin.ru

Pavlovsk (Russian: Па́вловск) is a town and the administrative center of Pavlovsky District in Voronezh Oblast, Russia, located on the left bank of the Don River at its confluence with the Osered), 234 kilometers (145 mi) southeast of Voronezh, the administrative center of the oblast. Population: 22,384 (2021 census); 25,126 (2010 census); 26,365 (2002 census); 25,905 (1989 Soviet census).

== History ==
In 1709, Peter the Great moved the ship docks from Voronezh to the new location and started the construction of a new fortress, which at different times was called Sereda, Osered, and Oseredskaya. In 1711, a garrison was moved here from the St. Paul Fortress on the Sea of Azov, and the fortress was renamed Pavlovskaya (sometimes called Novopavlovskaya), and the town around it—Pavlovsk.

By the end of the 18th century the town lost its importance and went into decline.

== Administrative and municipal status ==
Within the framework of administrative divisions, Pavlovsk serves as the administrative center of Pavlovsky District. As an administrative division, it is incorporated within Pavlovsky District as Pavlovsk Urban Settlement. As a municipal division, this administrative unit also has urban settlement status and is a part of Pavlovsky Municipal District.

== Gallery ==
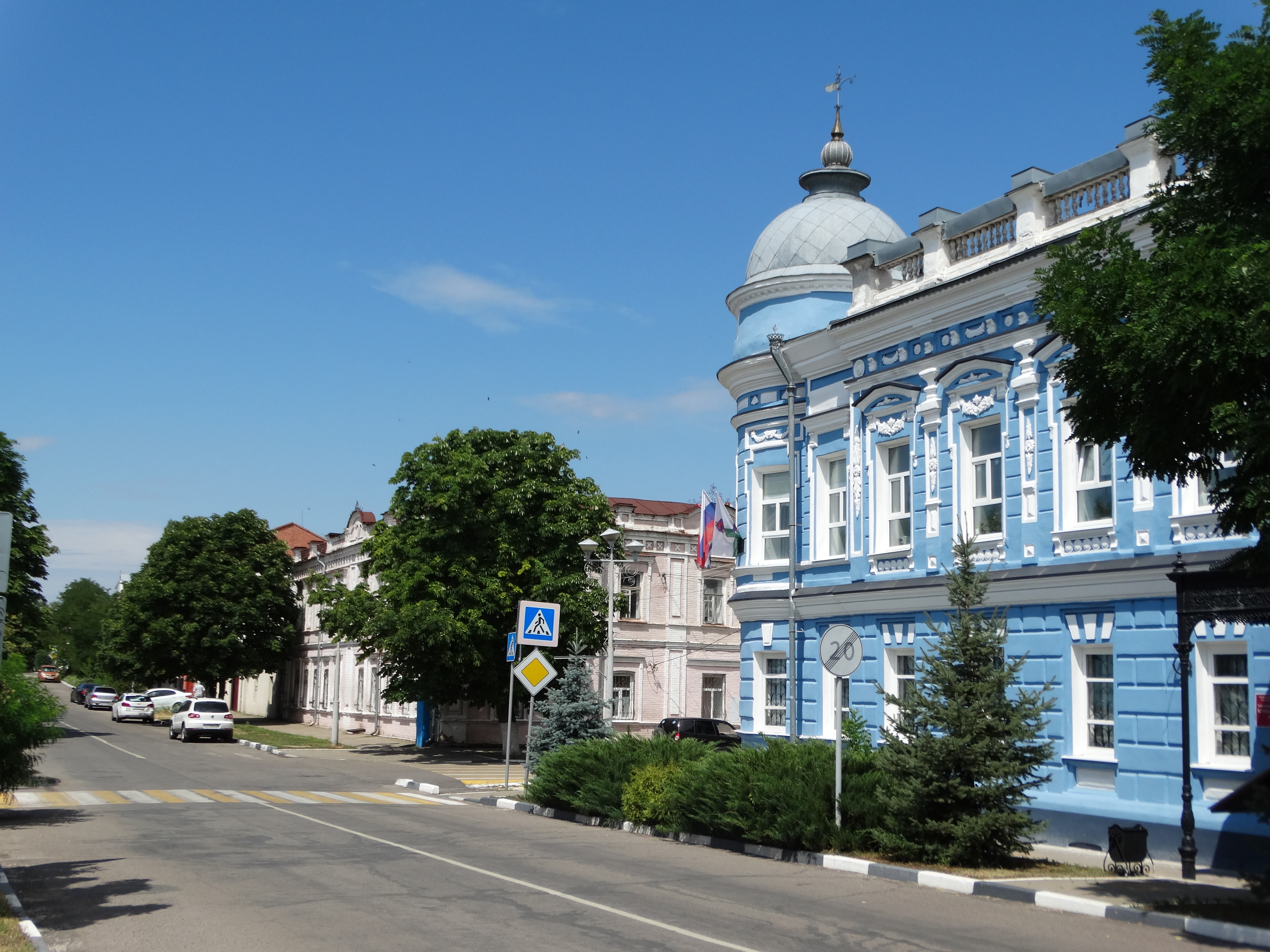

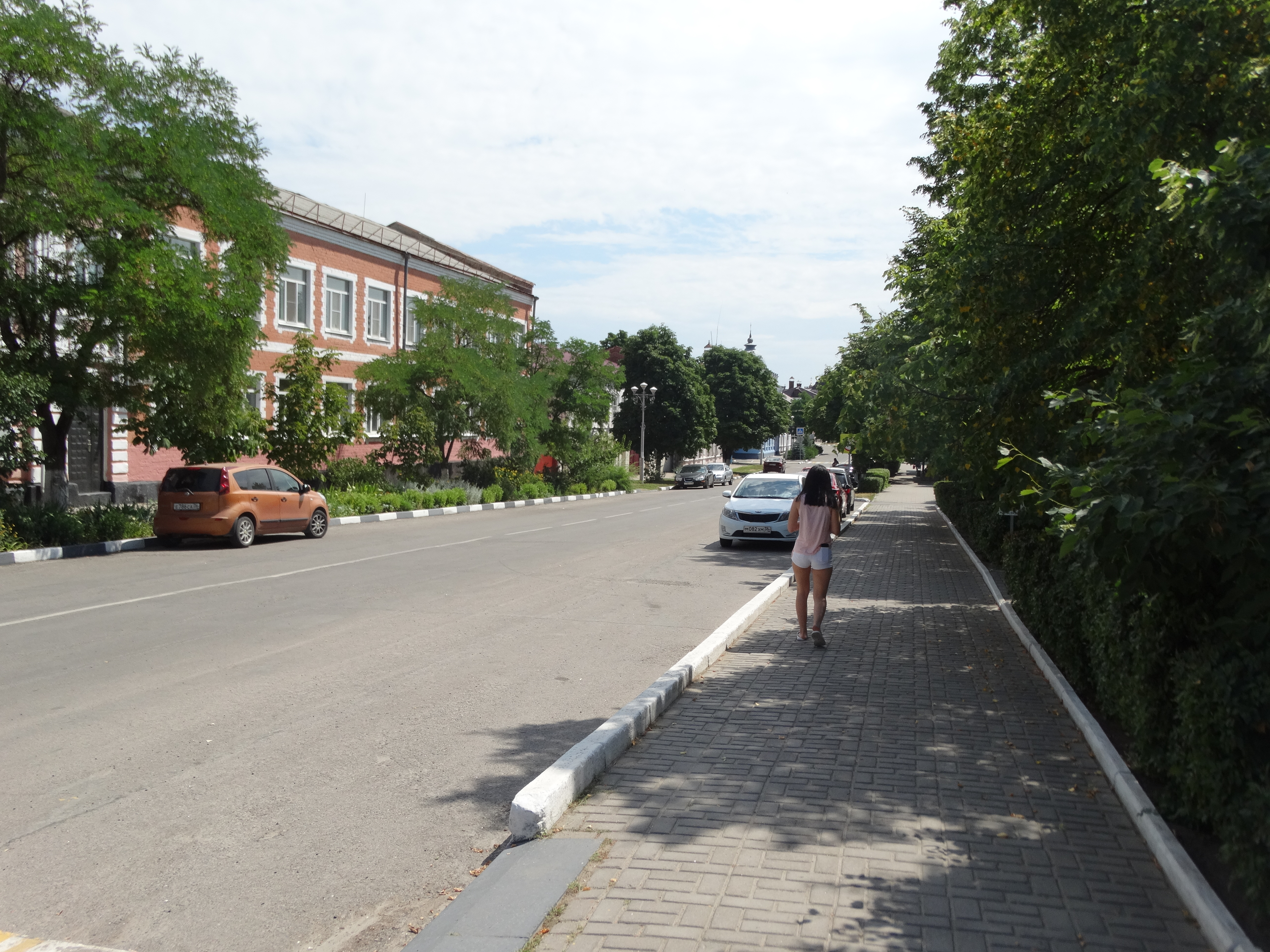

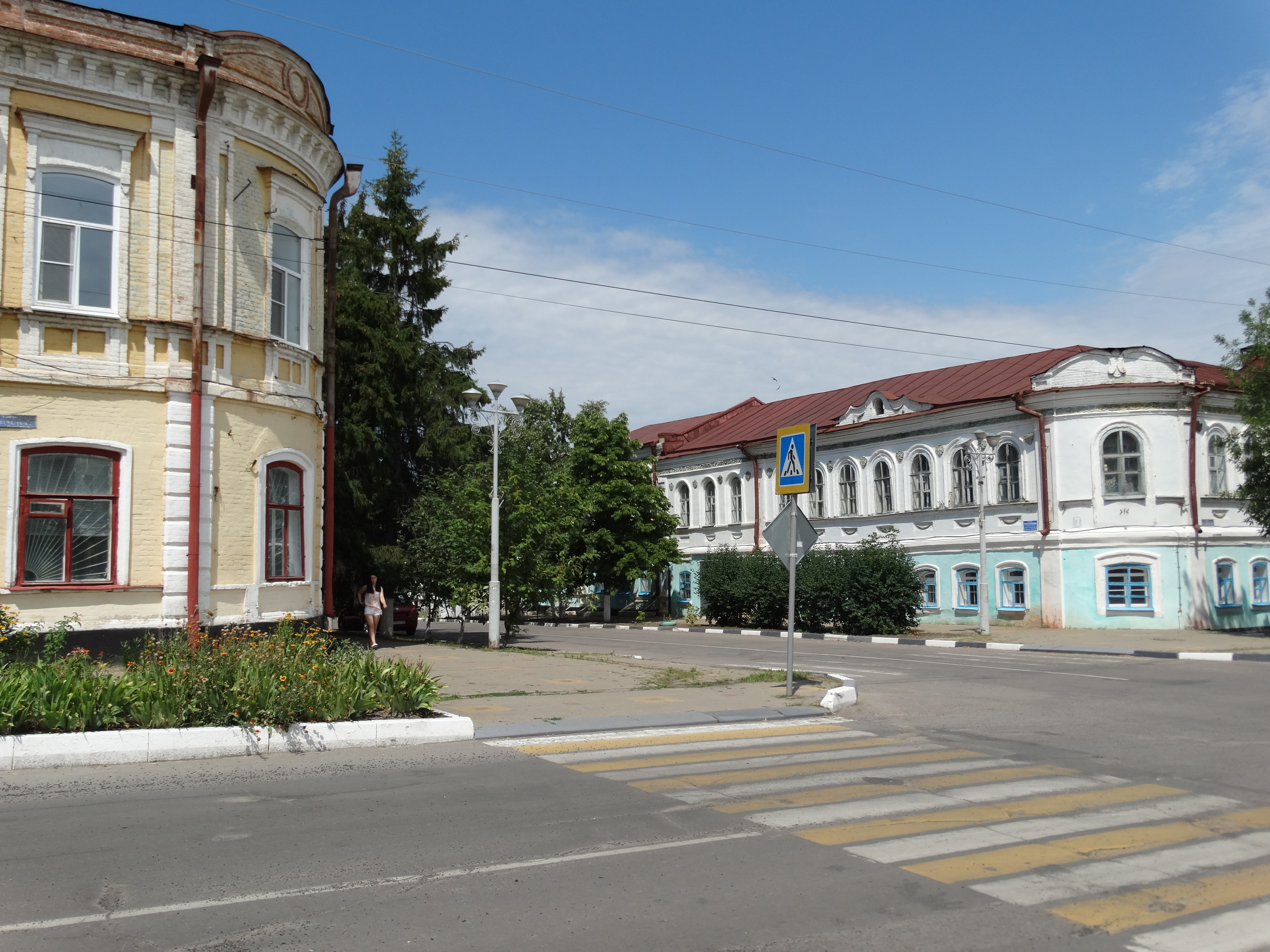

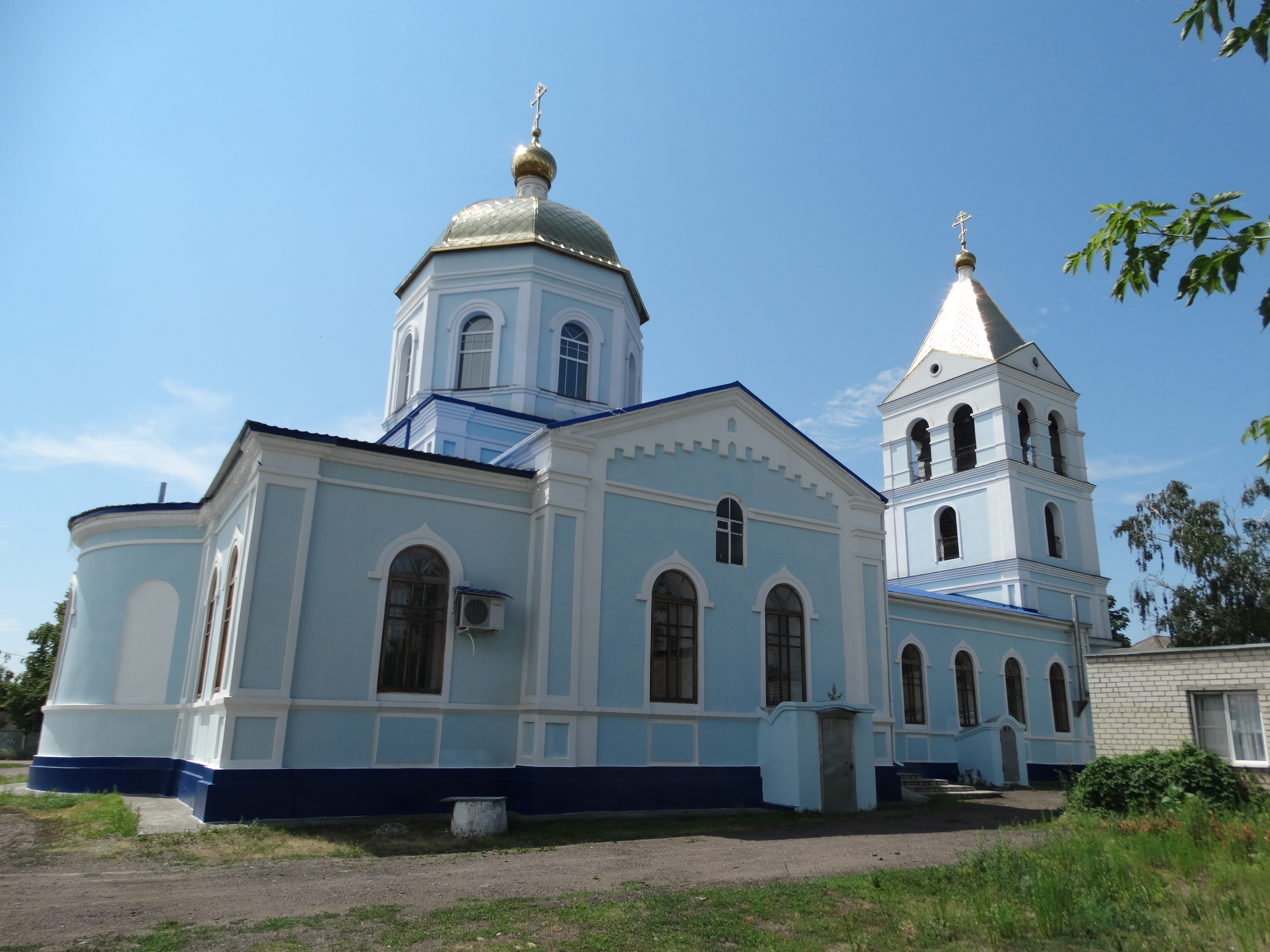

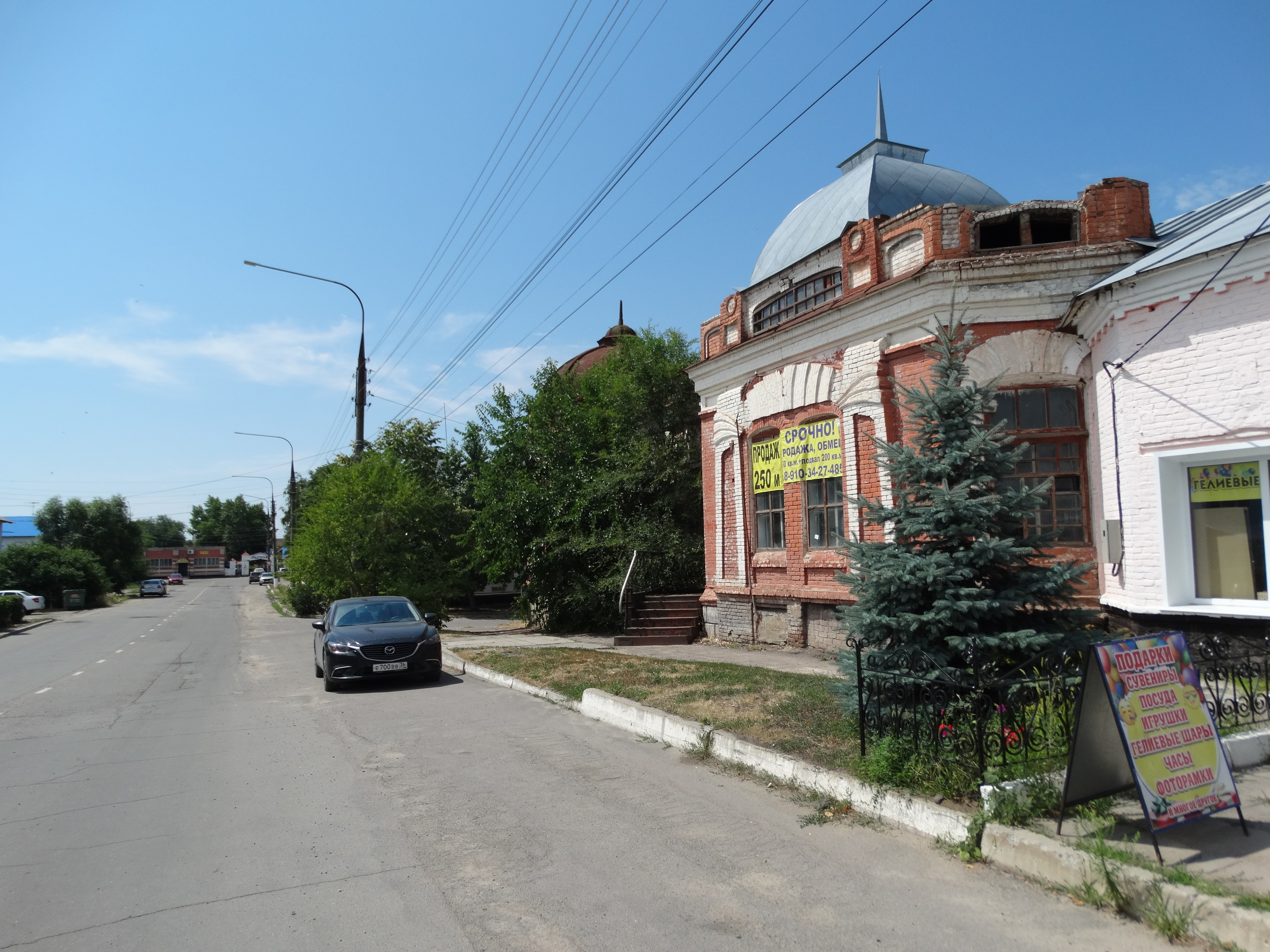

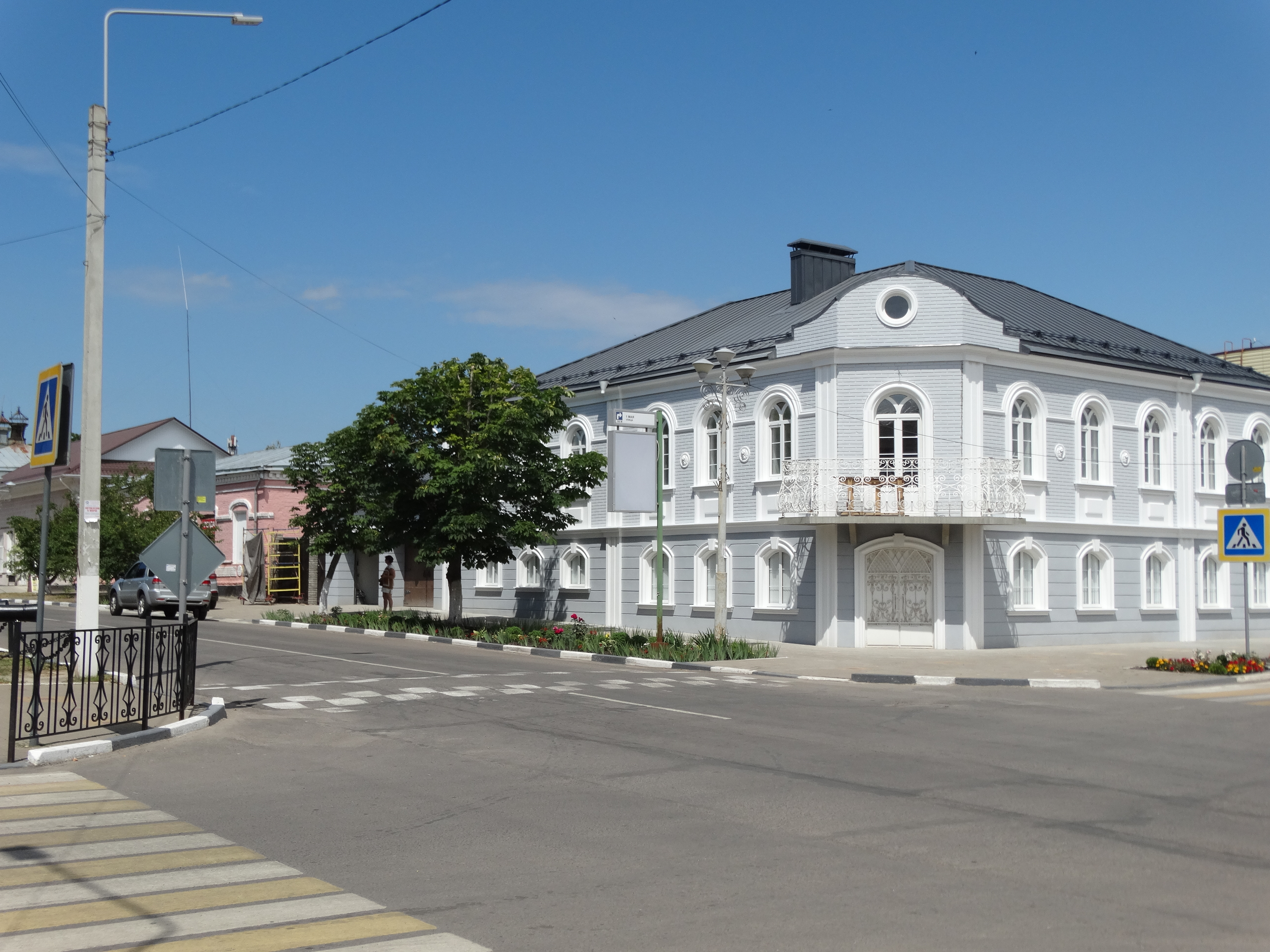
