= Pavlovsky District, Ulyanovsk Oblast =

Pavlovsky District Павловский район (Russian)
- District
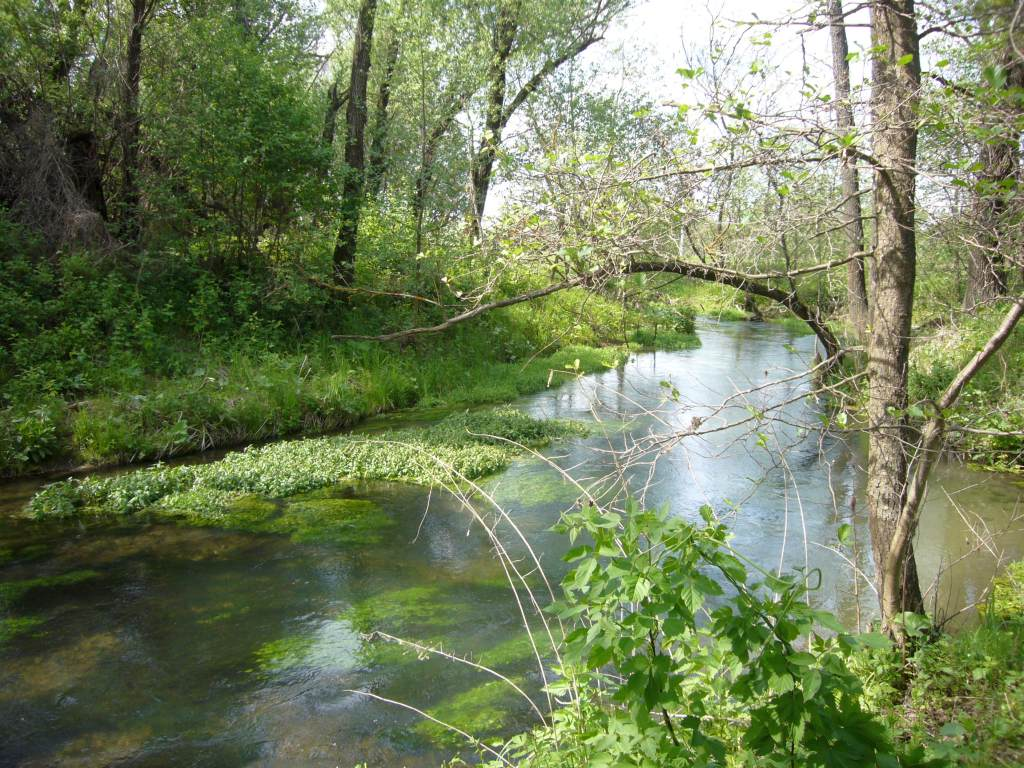
- Izbalyk Shikovsky River, Pavlovsky District

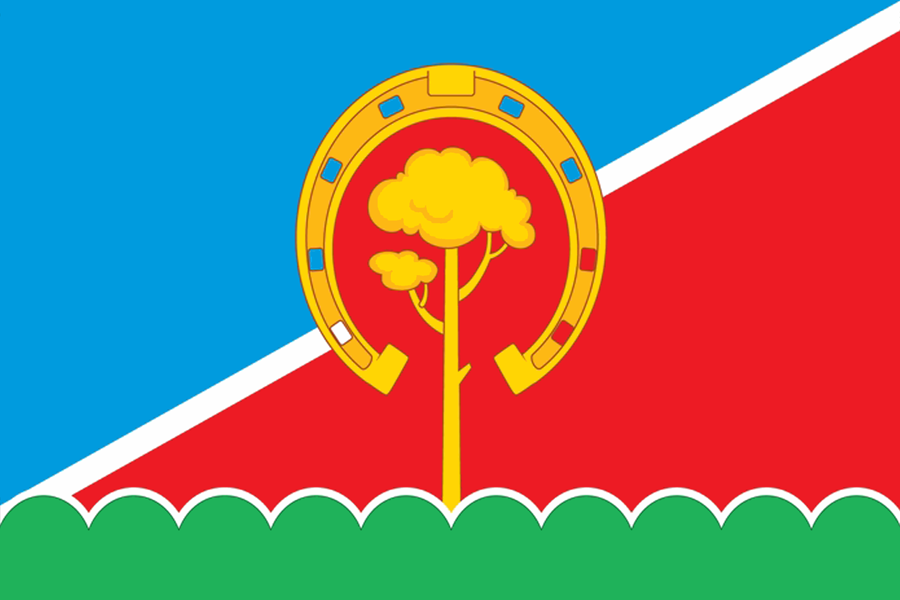
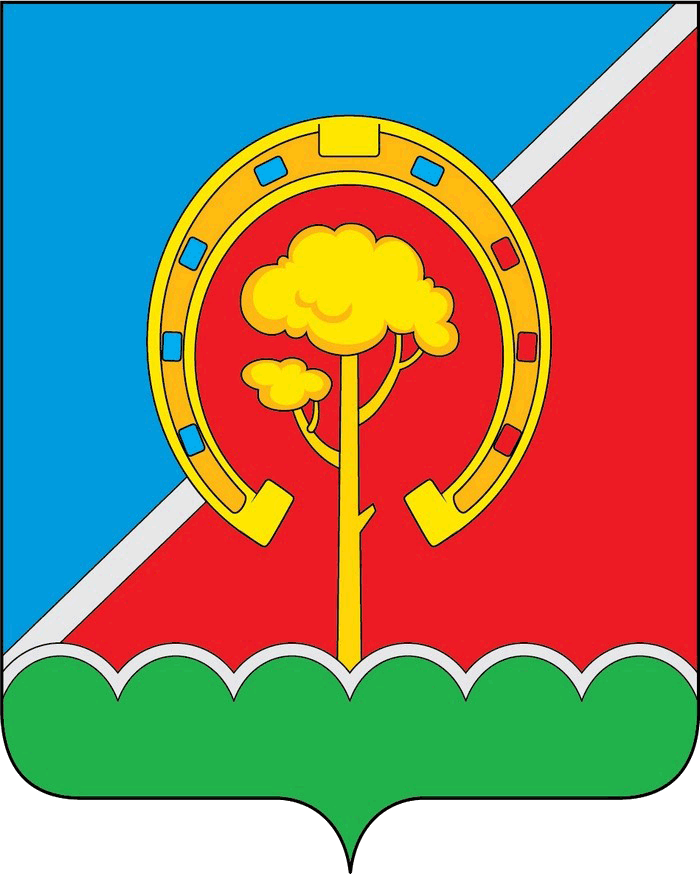
- Flag Coat of arms
- Location of Pavlovsky District in Ulyanovsk Oblast
- Coordinates: 52°41′10″N 47°08′15″E
- Country: Russia
- Federal subject: Ulyanovsk Oblast
- Administrative center: Pavlovka

Area
  - Total: 1,017.6 km^{2} (392.9 sq mi)

Population (2010 Census)
  - Total: 15,109
  - Density: 14.848/km^{2} (38.455/sq mi)
  - Urban: 37.2%
  - Rural: 62.8%

Administrative structure
  - Administrative divisions: 1 Settlement okrugs, 5 Rural okrugs
  - Inhabited localities: 1 urban-type settlements, 27 rural localities

Municipal structure
  - Municipally incorporated as: Pavlovsky Municipal District
  - Municipal divisions: 1 urban settlements, 5 rural settlements
- Time zone: UTC+4 (UTC+04:00)
- OKTMO ID: 73632000
- Website: http://pavlovka.ulregion.ru/

Pavlovsky District (Russian: Па́вловский райо́н) is an administrative and municipal district (raion), one of the twenty-one in Ulyanovsk Oblast, Russia. It is located in the southwest of the oblast. The area of the district is 1,017.6 square kilometers (392.9 sq mi). Its administrative center is the urban locality (a work settlement) of Pavlovka. Population: 15,109 (2010 Census); 16,539 (2002 census); 17,453 (1989 Soviet census). The population of Pavlovka accounts for 37.2% of the district's total population.
