= Pavlovsky District, Voronezh Oblast =

Pavlovsky District Павловский район (Russian)
- District
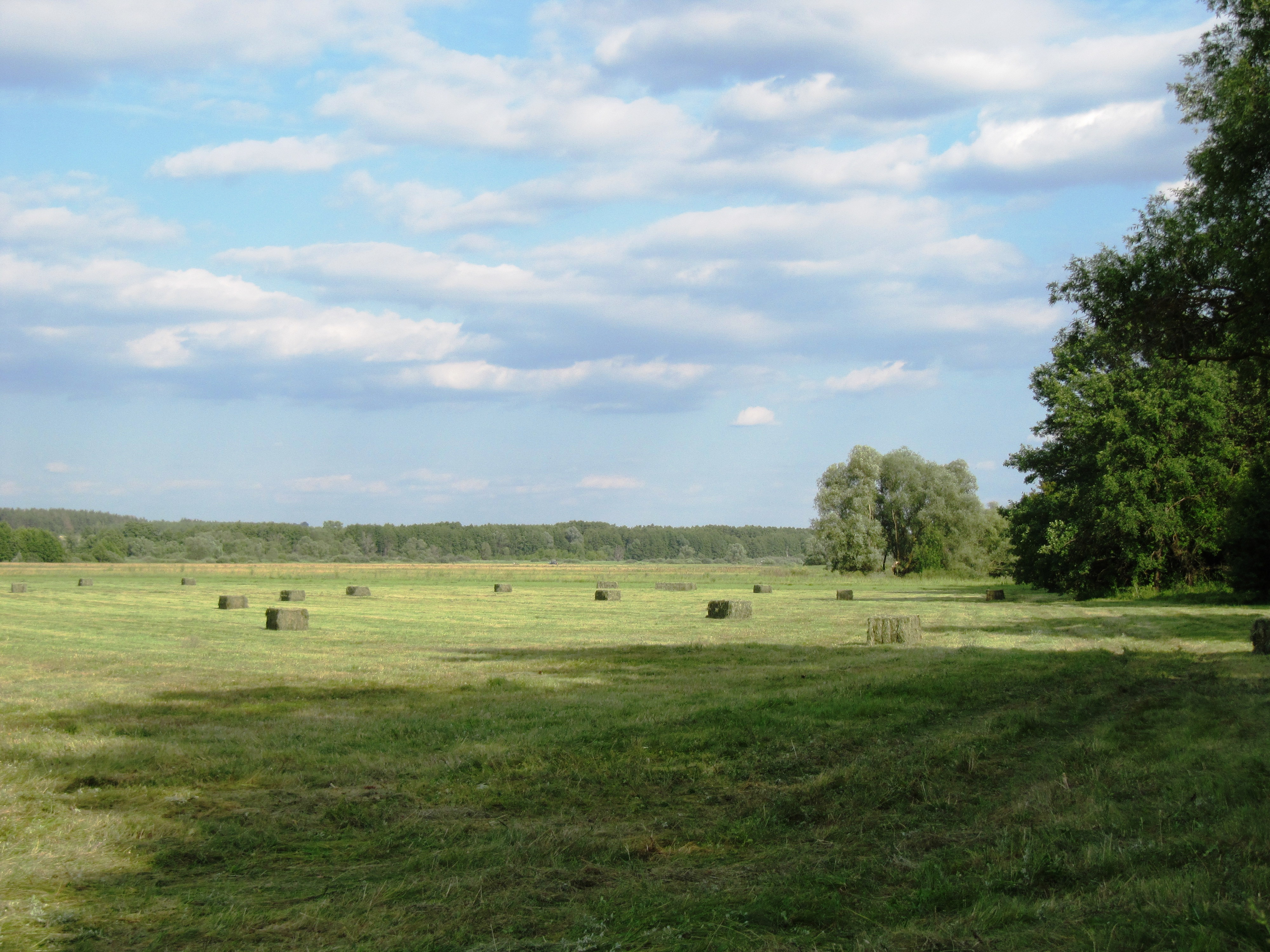
- Meadow on the floodplain of the Don River, Pavlovsky District

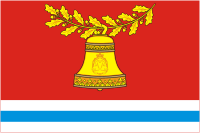
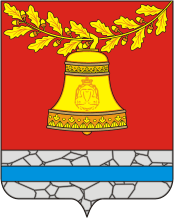
- Flag Coat of arms
- Location of Pavlovsky District in Voronezh Oblast
- Coordinates: 50°27′N 40°07′E
- Country: Russia
- Federal subject: Voronezh Oblast
- Established: 30 July 1928
- Administrative center: Pavlovsk

Area
  - Total: 1,886 km^{2} (728 sq mi)

Population (2010 Census)
  - Total: 57,081
  - Density: 30.27/km^{2} (78.39/sq mi)
  - Urban: 44.0%
  - Rural: 56.0%

Administrative structure
  - Administrative divisions: 1 Urban settlements, 14 Rural settlements
  - Inhabited localities: 1 cities/towns, 53 rural localities

Municipal structure
  - Municipally incorporated as: Pavlovsky Municipal District
  - Municipal divisions: 1 urban settlements, 14 rural settlements
- Time zone: UTC+3 (MSK)
- OKTMO ID: 20633000
- Website: http://www.pavlovsk-region.ru/

Pavlovsky District (Russian: Па́вловский райо́н) is an administrative and municipal district (raion), one of the thirty-two in Voronezh Oblast, Russia. It is located in the center of the oblast. The area of the district is 1,886 square kilometers (728 sq mi). Its administrative center is the town of Pavlovsk. Population: 51,144 (2021 census); 57,081 (2010 census); 59,355 (2002 census); 58,526 (1989 Soviet census). The population of Pavlovsk accounts for 43.8% of the district's total population.
