= Pavlovka =

Pavlovka may refer to:

- Pavlovka, Russia, several inhabited localities in Russia
- Pavlovka (meteorite), a meteorite that fell in Russia in 1882
- Pavlovka, until 1999, name of Müşkür, a village in Azerbaijan
