= Pavlov =

Pavlov (or its variant Pavliv) may refer to:

== People ==
- Pavlov (surname) (fem. Pavlova), a common Bulgarian and Russian last name
- Ivan Pavlov, Russian physiologist famous for his experiments in classical conditioning

== Places ==
=== Czech Republic ===
- Pavlov (Břeclav District), a municipality and village in the South Moravian Region
- Pavlov (Havlíčkův Brod District), a municipality and village in the Vysočina Region
- Pavlov (Jihlava District), a municipality and village in the Vysočina Region
- Pavlov (Kladno District), a municipality and village in the Central Bohemian Region
- Pavlov (Pelhřimov District), a municipality and village in the Vysočina Region
- Pavlov (Šumperk District), a municipality and village in the Olomouc Region
- Pavlov (Žďár nad Sázavou District), a municipality and village in the Vysočina Region
- Pavlov, a village and part of Benešov in the Central Bohemian Region
- Pavlov, a village and part of Mladá Vožice in the South Bohemian Region
- Pavlov u Herálce, a village and part of Herálec (Havlíčkův Brod District) in the Vysočina Region

=== Russia ===
- Pavlov, Russia (or Pavlova), several rural localities in Russia

=== Ukraine ===
- Pavliv, Ternopil Oblast (Pavlov), a village in Ternopil Raion of Ternopil Oblast
- Pavliv, Radekhiv Raion (Pavlov), a village in Radekhiv Raion of Lviv Oblast

== Other uses ==
- Pavlov (crater), a large lunar crater on the far side of the Moon

== See also ==
- Pavel, masculine given name
- Pavlof (disambiguation)
- Pavlova (disambiguation)
- Pavlovice (disambiguation)
- Pavlovs, a surname
- Pavlovsk (disambiguation)
- Pavlovsky (disambiguation)
- Pavlovo, several inhabited localities in Russia
- Pavlov's Dog (band), a 1970s American rock band
- Pavlov's House, a key Soviet fortress during the Battle of Stalingrad in World War II
- Win–stay, lose–switch, a strategy in Game theory named after Ivan Pavlov.
