= Pavlov (surname) =

Pavlov and its feminine form Pavlova are common Russian (Па́влов, Па́влова) and Bulgarian surnames. Their Ukrainian variant is Pavliv. All stem from Latin Christian name Paulus (English: Paul; Russian: Pavel; Ukrainian: Pavlo). Notable people with the name Pavlov or Pavlova include:

== Arts and entertainment ==
- Alla Pavlova (born 1952), Russian composer
- Anelia Pavlova (born 1956), Bulgarian-born Australian artist
- Anna Pavlova (1881–1931), Russian ballet dancer
- Anna Pavlova (gymnast) (born 1987), Russian artistic gymnast
- Dmitri Pavlov (composer) (born 1959), Russian composer
- Karolina Pavlova, Russian writer
- Nikolai Pavlov, Russian writer
- Oleg Pavlov (1970–2018), Russian writer
- Petya Pavlova, Bulgarian singer
- Sergey A. Pavlov (born 1958), Russian actor, director
- Vera Pavlova, Russian writer
- Viktor Pavlov (1940–2006), Soviet/Russian actor

== Government and politics ==
- Aleksandr Pavlov (politician), Kazakhstani politician, economist, financier and banker
- Jo Pavlov, Green Party Candidate, Hamilton, Ontario, Canada
- Sergei Pavlov - Soviet politician
- Valentin Pavlov, Prime Minister of the Soviet Union
- Vladimir Pavlov (politician, born 1956), Russian politician
- Vladimir Pavlov (politician, born 1976), Russian politician

=== Military ===
- Aleksey Pavlov (lieutenant) ru (1913–1949), Hero of the Soviet Union
- Aleksey Pavlov (pilot) ru (1922–1995), Hero of the Soviet Union
- Dmitry Pavlov (general) (1897–1941), Soviet general
- Yakov Pavlov (1917–1981), Soviet platoon commander

== Science ==
- Alexei Petrovich Pavlov (1854–1929), Russian geologist and paleontologist
- Ivan Pavlov (1849–1936), Nobel Prize–winning Russian physiologist noted for his classical conditioning experiments with dogs
- Maria Pavlova (1854–1938), Russian paleontologist
- Mikhail Grigoryevich Pavlov (1793–1840), Russian philosopher and scientist
- Nina Pavlova (1897–1973), Russian botanist

== Sport ==
=== Football (soccer) ===
- Alyaksandr Pawlaw (born 1984), Belarusian international footballer
- Sergei Aleksandrovich Pavlov (born 1955), Russian football manager
- Yevhen Pavlov (born 1991), Ukrainian footballer

=== Track and field ===
- Igor Pavlov (athlete) (born 1979), Russian pole vaulter
- Pavel Pavlov (athlete) (1952–2004), Bulgarian sprinter
- Pepa Pavlova, Bulgarian sprinter

=== Other sports ===
- Aleksandr Pavlov (wrestler) (born 1973), Belarusian wrestler
- Alexander Pavlov (figure skater), Australian figure skater
- Anna Pavlova (gymnast) (born 1987), Russian artistic gymnast
- Bogomil Pavlov (born 1992), Bulgarian ski jumper
- Igor Pavlov (ice hockey player) (born 1965), Latvian ice hockey player, ice hockey coach in Germany
- Ivan Pavlov (figure skater), Ukrainian figure skater
- Mircea Pavlov (born 1937), Romanian chess master
- Pavel Pavlov (wrestler) (born 1953), Bulgarian wrestler
- Serhii Pavlov (born 1997), Ukrainian basketball player
- Yelena Pavlova, Kazakhstani volleyball player

== Other people ==
- Cyril Pavlov (1919–2017), Russian Orthodox hieromonk and archimandrite, confessor of Russian patriarchs
- Igor Pavlov (programmer), Russian freelance programmer, creator of 7-zip
- Ilia Pavlov (1960–2003), Bulgarian businessman
- Mikhail Pavlov (disambiguation)
- Nikolay Pavlov (disambiguation)

== Fictional characters ==
- The Contesa Pavlova, fictional character in the film Buenos Aires me mata

== See also ==
- Pavlov (disambiguation)
- Pavlova (disambiguation)
- Muriel Pavlow, British actress
