= Pavlof =

Pavlof may refer to:

- Pavlof Bay, a bay in Alaska, United States
- Mount Pavlof, a volcano in Alaska, United States
- Pavlof Sister, a volcano in Alaska, United States

== See also ==
- Pavlov (disambiguation)
