= Pavlovs =

Pavlovs is a surname. Notable people with the surname include:

- Andrejs Pavlovs (born 1979), Latvian football goalkeeper
- Arkādijs Pavlovs (1903–1960), Latvian footballer and football manager
- Deniss Pavlovs (born 1983), Latvian tennis player
- Igors Pavlovs (born 1965), Latvian ice hockey player
- Vitālijs Pavlovs (born 1989), Latvian ice hockey player

== See also ==
- Pavlov (disambiguation)
- Pavlov's dog (disambiguation)
- Pavlov's typology
- Pavlov's House, building in Russia
