= Igor Pavlov =

Igor Pavlov may refer to:

- Igor Pavlov (athlete) (born 1979), Russian pole vaulter
- Igor Pavlov, creator of 7-Zip
- Igors Pavlovs (born 1965), Latvian ice hockey player, ice hockey coach in Germany
