= Pavlovice =

Pavlovice may refer to places in the Czech Republic:

- Pavlovice (Benešov District), a municipality and village in the Central Bohemian Region
- Pavlovice u Kojetína, a municipality and village in the Olomouc Region
- Pavlovice u Přerova, a municipality and village in the Olomouc Region
- Pavlovice, a village and part of Bohdalice-Pavlovice in the South Moravian Region
- Pavlovice, a village and part of Jestřebí (Česká Lípa District) in the Liberec Region
- Pavlovice, a village and part of Planá in the Plzeň Region
- Pavlovice, a village and part of Vlastějovice in the Central Bohemian Region
- Moravecké Pavlovice, a municipality and village in the Vysočina Region
- Slezské Pavlovice, a municipality and village in the Moravian-Silesian Region
- Velké Pavlovice, a town in the South Moravian Region

== See also ==
- Pavlov (disambiguation)
