= Pavlova (disambiguation) =

A pavlova is a meringue-based dessert.

Pavlova may also refer to:

== People ==
- Pavlova, the feminine form of the surname Pavlov, including a list of people with the name Pavlova
  - Anna Pavlova (1881–1931), Russian ballerina
  - Anna Pavlova (gymnast) (born 1987), Russian artistic gymnast
  - Madara Pavlova (born 2008), Latvian luger

== Places ==
- Pavlova, Russia, the name of several places
- Pavlová, Slovakia
- I. P. Pavlova (Prague Metro), a metro station in the Czech Republic

== Other uses ==
- Pavlova (alga), a genus of algae

== See also ==
- Pavlov (disambiguation)
- Anna Pavlova (film), a 1983 film about the dancer
- Pavlova Huť Nature Reserve, in the Czech Republic
- Pavlova Ves, a village in Slovakia
