= Mikhail Pavlov =

Mikhail Pavlov may refer to:

- Mikhail Pavlov (scientist) (1793–1840), Russian academic
- Mikhail Pavlov (politician) (1952–2010), Belarusian statesman and mayor of Minsk
- Mikhail Pavlov (canoeist) (born 1986), Russian sprint canoer
