= Pavlovice (Benešov District) =

- Municipality
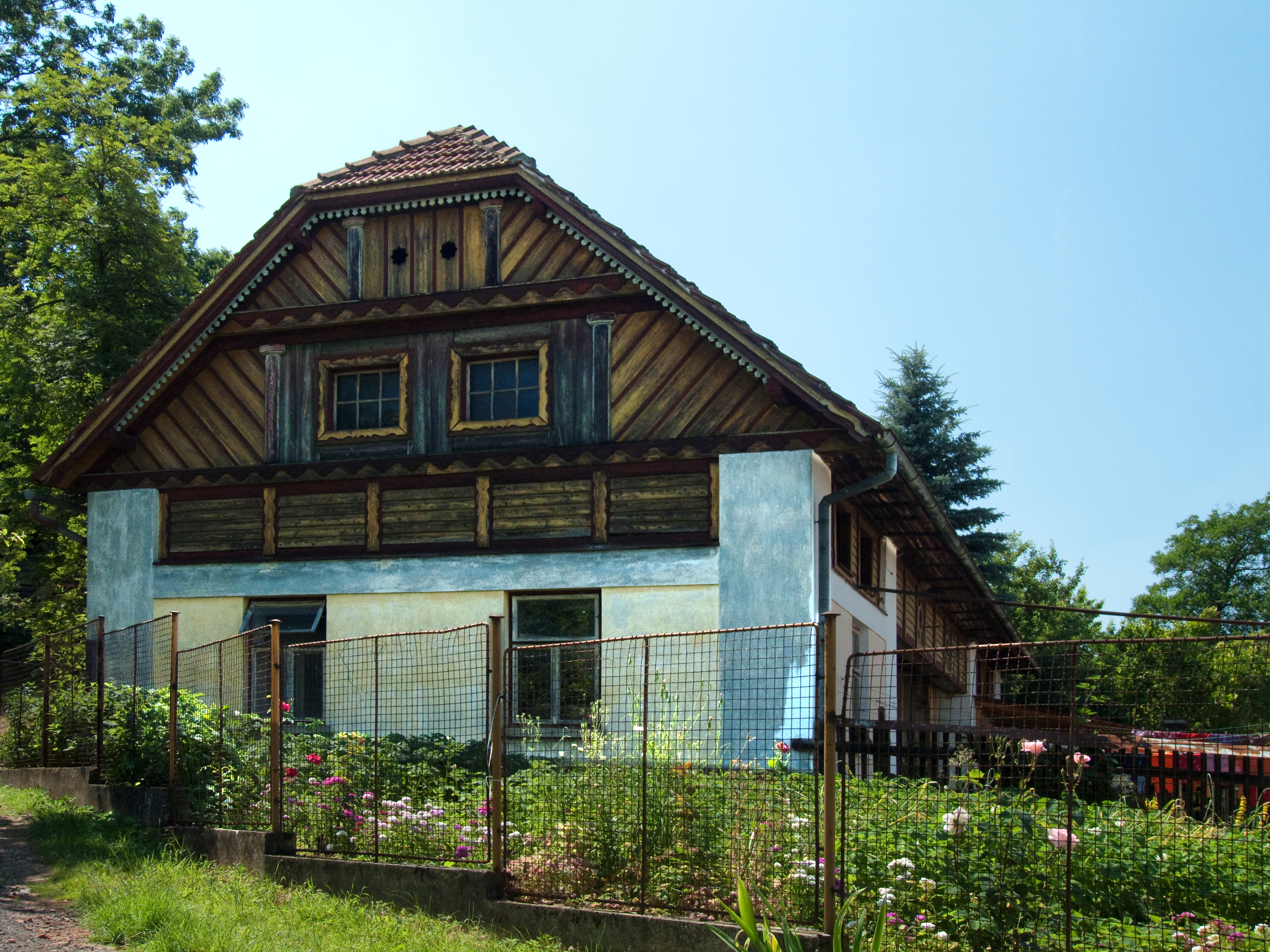
- Folk architecture house

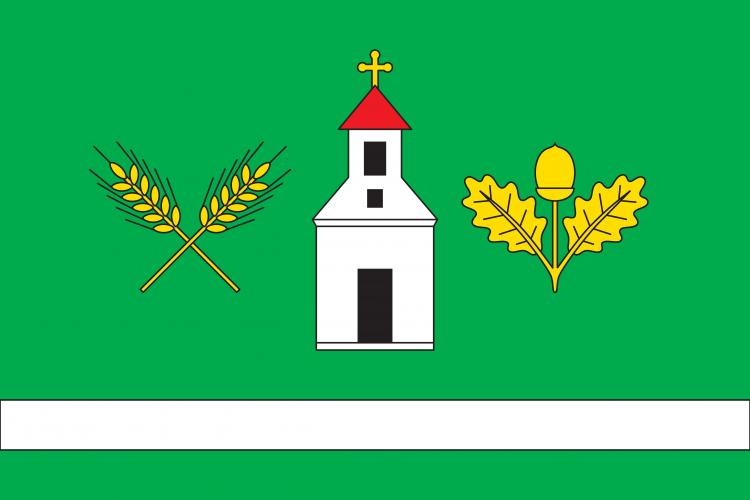
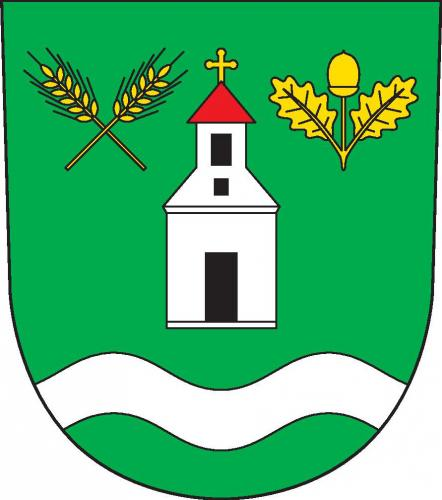
- Flag Coat of arms

- Location in the Czech Republic
- Coordinates: 49°42′55″N 14°55′59″E
- Country: Czech Republic
- Region: Central Bohemian
- District: Benešov
- First mentioned: 1391

Area
  - Total: 3.92 km^{2} (1.51 sq mi)
- Elevation: 405 m (1,329 ft)

Population (2026-01-01)
  - Total: 280
  - Density: 71/km^{2} (180/sq mi)
- Time zone: UTC+1 (CET)
  - Summer (DST): UTC+2 (CEST)
- Postal code: 258 01
- Website: obecpavlovice.cz

Pavlovice is a municipality and village in Benešov District in the Central Bohemian Region of the Czech Republic. It has about 300 inhabitants.

== Etymology ==
The name is derived from the personal name Pavel, meaning "the village of Pavel's people".

== Geography ==
Pavlovice is located about 19 kilometres (12 mi) southeast of Benešov and 47 km (29 mi) southeast of Prague. It lies in the Vlašim Uplands. The highest point is at 462 m (1,516 ft) above sea level. The Blanice River briefly flows along the western municipal border.

== History ==
The first written mention of Pavlovice is from 1391.

== Demographics ==
Historical population

Year	Pop.	±%
1869	323	—
1880	311	−3.7%
1890	293	−5.8%
1900	278	−5.1%
1910	280	+0.7%

Year	Pop.	±%
1921	260	−7.1%
1930	272	+4.6%
1950	187	−31.2%
1961	222	+18.7%
1970	200	−9.9%

Year	Pop.	±%
1980	217	+8.5%
1991	192	−11.5%
2001	165	−14.1%
2011	210	+27.3%
2021	243	+15.7%

Source: Censuses

== Transport ==
There are no railways or major roads passing through the municipality.

== Sights ==
The only protected cultural monument in the municipality in a small granary from the 18th or 19th century.
