= Pavlof Sister =

Stratovolcano in Alaska, United States

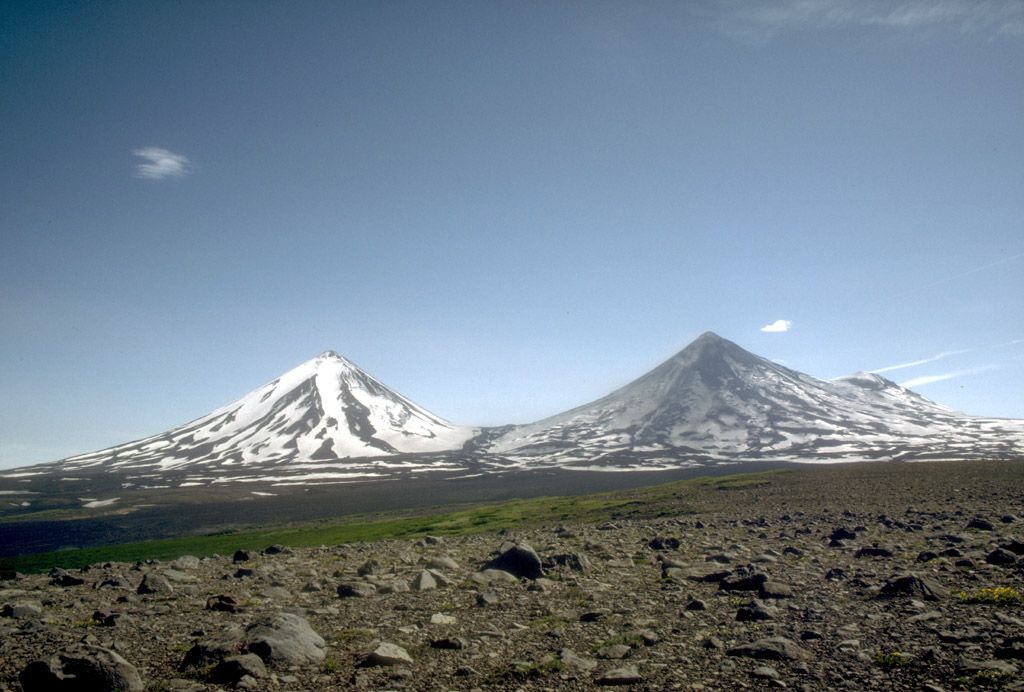
- Pavlof Sister (left) and Pavlof (right) - July 1975

Highest point
- Elevation: 7,027 ft (2,142 m)
- Coordinates: 55°27′27″N 161°51′16″W

Geography
- Location within Alaska
- Location: Alaska Peninsula, Alaska, U.S.
- Parent range: Aleutian Range
- Topo map: USGS Port Moller B-6

Geology
- Formed by: Subduction zone volcanism
- Mountain type: Stratovolcano
- Volcanic arc: Aleutian Arc
- Last eruption: 1786 (questionable)

Pavlof Sister is a stratovolcano on the Alaska Peninsula. It is a satellite peak of Pavlof Volcano, lying directly northeast. The mountain was named by the USGS in 1929. It is considered dormant, as the volcano was reported to have last erupted between 1762 and 1786 although the event is questionable. The Alaska Volcano Observatory has the volcano alert level of Pavlof Sister set to "Unassigned", meaning the volcano is not currently monitored.

== Sources ==
- "Pavlof Sister". Global Volcanism Program. Smithsonian Institution.
- Volcanoes of the Alaska Peninsula and Aleutian Islands-Selected Photographs
- Alaska Volcano Observatory

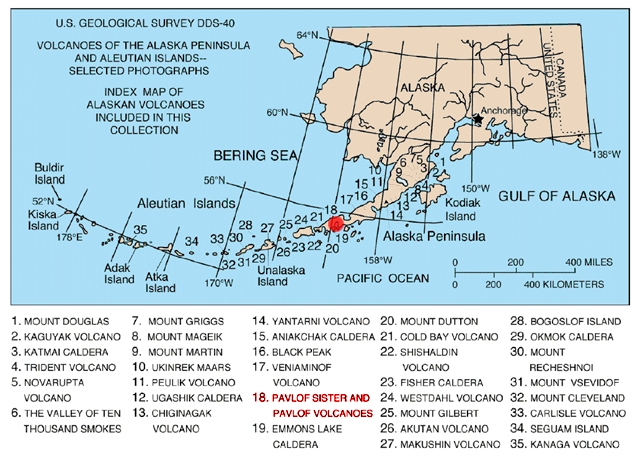
Map showing volcanoes of Alaska. The mark is set at the location of Pavlof Sister.
