= Pavlov (Pelhřimov District) =

- Municipality
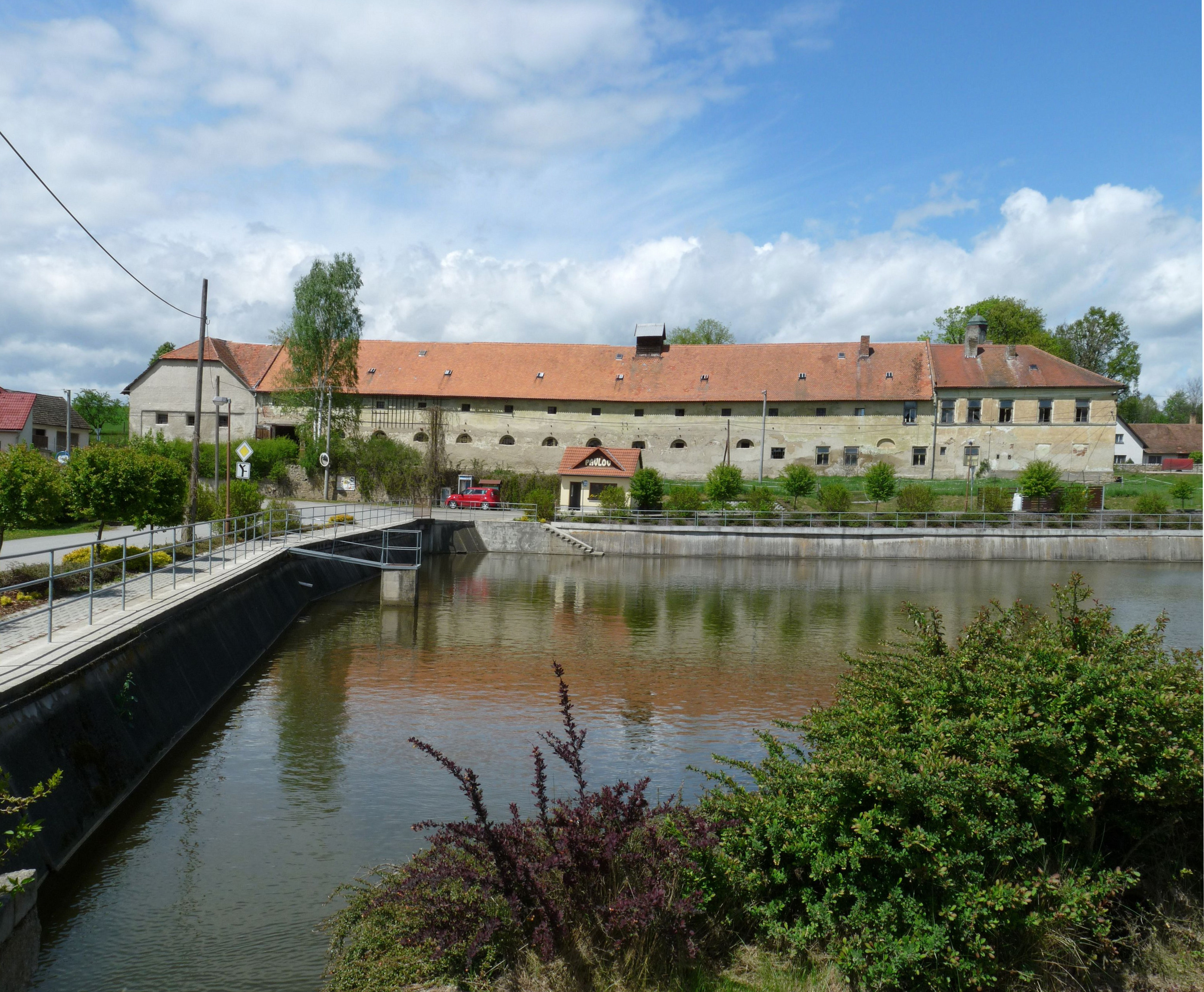
- Manor house

- Location in the Czech Republic
- Coordinates: 49°23′55″N 15°14′38″E
- Country: Czech Republic
- Region: Vysočina
- District: Pelhřimov
- First mentioned: 1377

Area
  - Total: 1.74 km^{2} (0.67 sq mi)
- Elevation: 522 m (1,713 ft)

Population (2026-01-01)
  - Total: 115
  - Density: 66.1/km^{2} (171/sq mi)
- Time zone: UTC+1 (CET)
  - Summer (DST): UTC+2 (CEST)
- Postal code: 393 01
- Website: www.pavlov-pe.cz

Pavlov is a municipality and village in Pelhřimov District in the Vysočina Region of the Czech Republic. It has about 100 inhabitants.

Pavlov lies approximately 5 kilometres (3 mi) south-east of Pelhřimov, 25 km (16 mi) west of Jihlava, and 97 km (60 mi) south-east of Prague.

== Demographics ==
Historical population
Year	Pop.	±%
1869	236	—
1880	285	+20.8%
1890	261	−8.4%
1900	273	+4.6%
1910	267	−2.2%
1921	250	−6.4%
1930	195	−22.0%
1950	149	−23.6%
1961	165	+10.7%
1970	153	−7.3%
1980	141	−7.8%
1991	142	+0.7%
2001	136	−4.2%
2011	131	−3.7%
2021	119	−9.2%
Source: Censuses
