= Pavlov (Havlíčkův Brod District) =

- Municipality
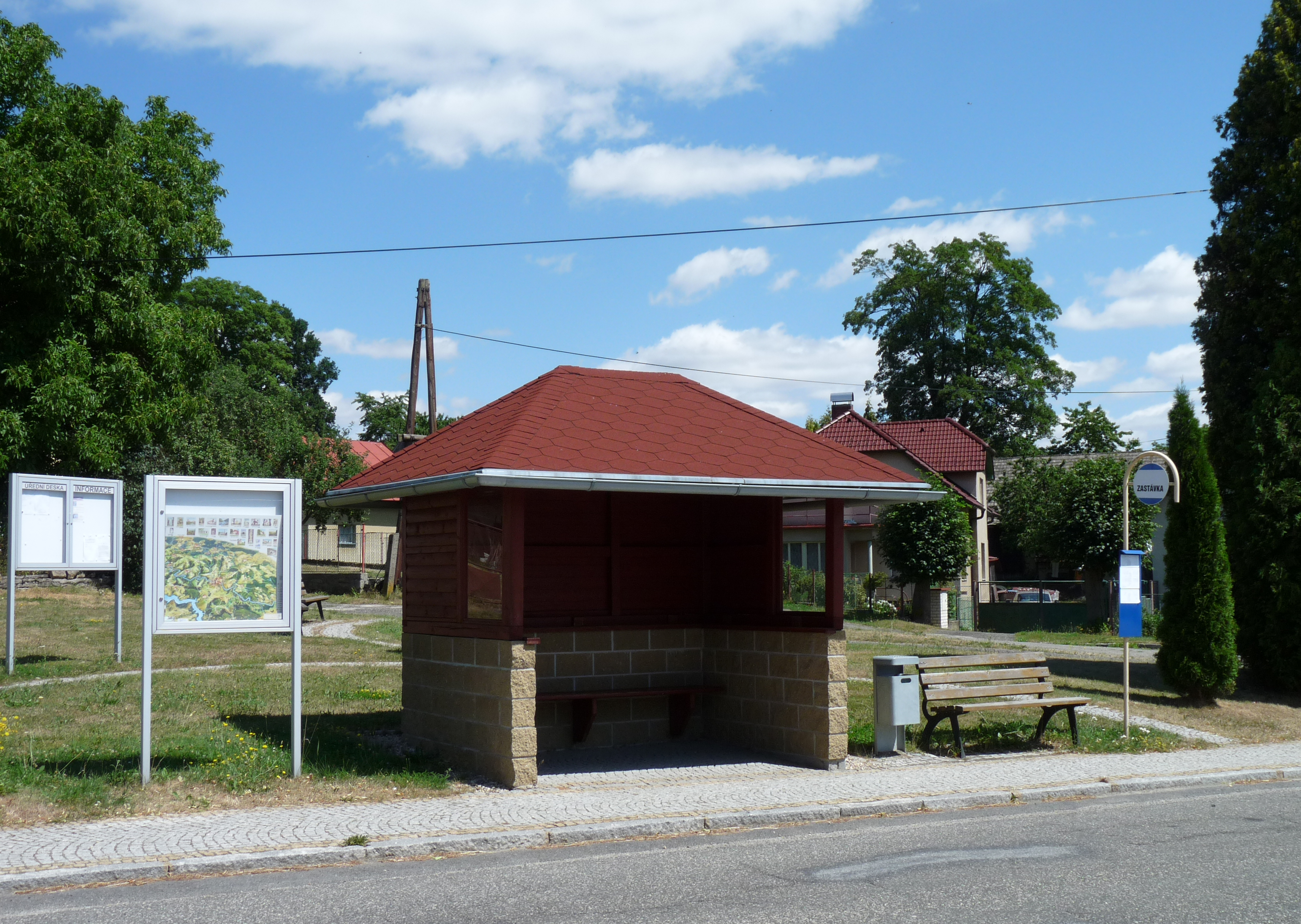
- Centre of Pavlov

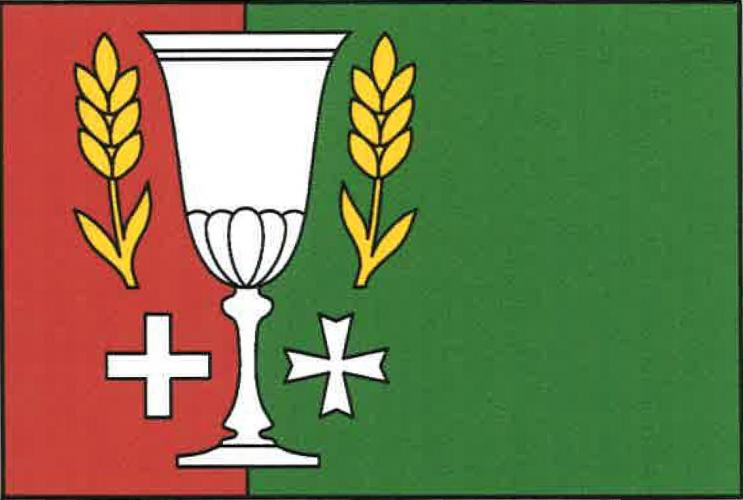
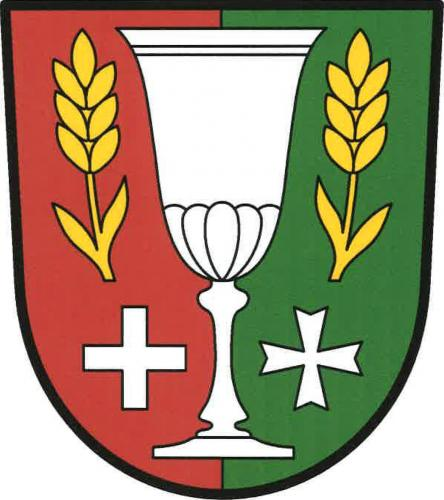
- Flag Coat of arms

- Location in the Czech Republic
- Coordinates: 49°41′57″N 15°19′57″E
- Country: Czech Republic
- Region: Vysočina
- District: Havlíčkův Brod
- First mentioned: 1289

Area
  - Total: 4.95 km^{2} (1.91 sq mi)
- Elevation: 467 m (1,532 ft)

Population (2026-01-01)
  - Total: 148
  - Density: 29.9/km^{2} (77.4/sq mi)
- Time zone: UTC+1 (CET)
  - Summer (DST): UTC+2 (CEST)
- Postal code: 584 01
- Website: pavlov-ledec.cz

Pavlov is a municipality and village in Havlíčkův Brod District in the Vysočina Region of the Czech Republic. It has about 100 inhabitants.

Pavlov lies approximately 20 kilometres (12 mi) north-west of Havlíčkův Brod, 38 km (24 mi) north-west of Jihlava, and 79 km (49 mi) south-east of Prague.

== Demographics ==
Historical population
Year	Pop.	±%
1869	393	—
1880	422	+7.4%
1890	277	−34.4%
1900	248	−10.5%
1910	246	−0.8%
1921	247	+0.4%
1930	239	−3.2%
1950	225	−5.9%
1961	214	−4.9%
1970	184	−14.0%
1980	159	−13.6%
1991	134	−15.7%
2001	125	−6.7%
2011	117	−6.4%
2021	120	+2.6%
Source: Censuses
