= Pavlov (Kladno District) =

- Municipality
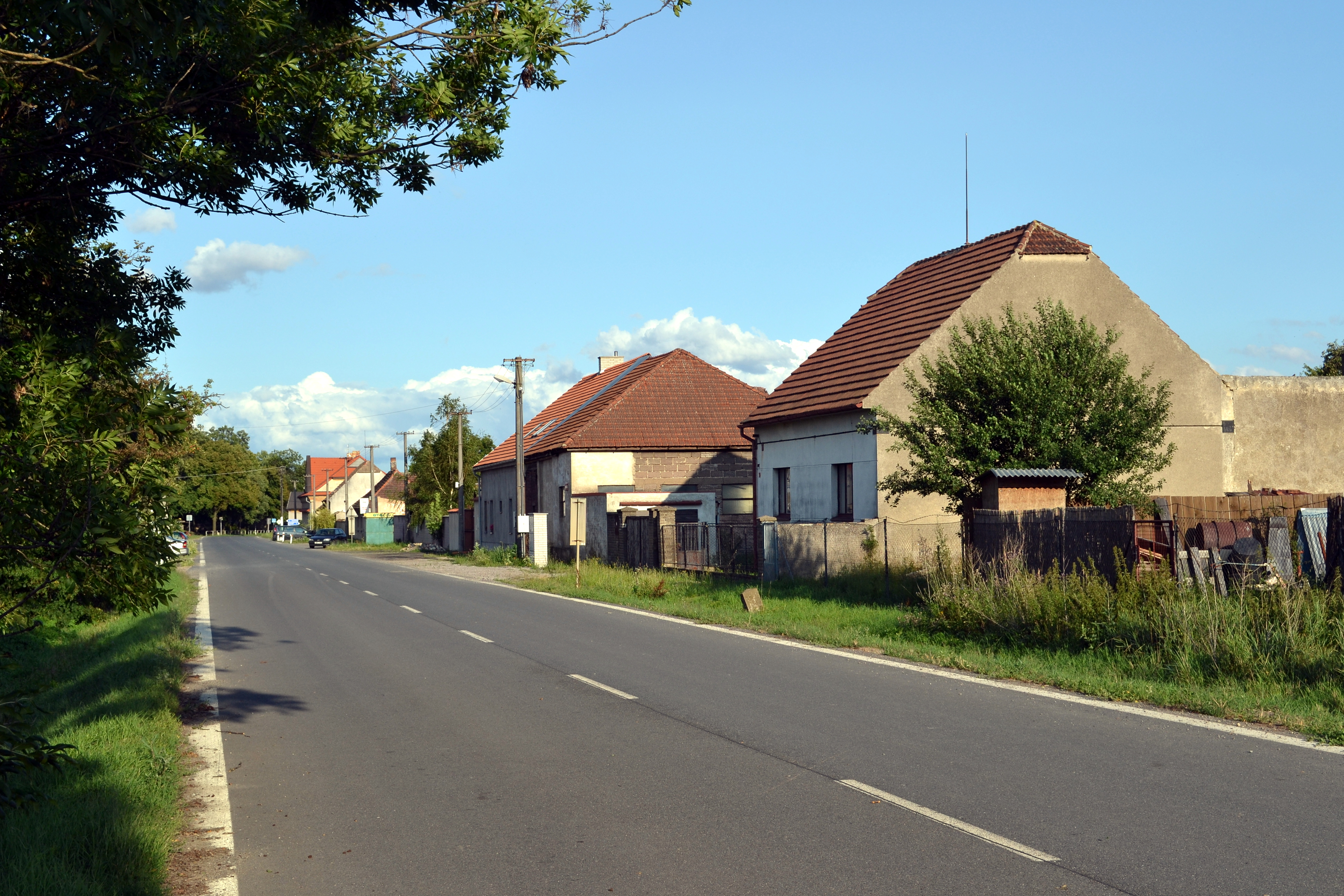
- Karlovarská street

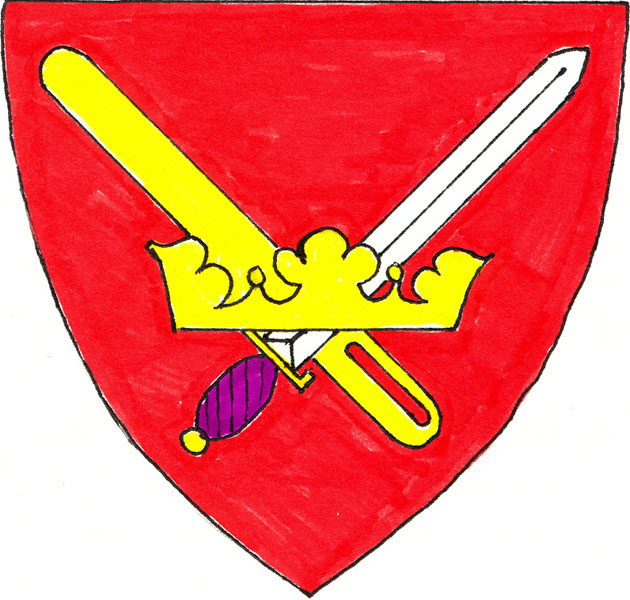
- Flag Coat of arms

- Location in the Czech Republic
- Coordinates: 50°5′47″N 14°10′2″E
- Country: Czech Republic
- Region: Central Bohemian
- District: Kladno
- First mentioned: 1519

Area
  - Total: 1.56 km^{2} (0.60 sq mi)
- Elevation: 387 m (1,270 ft)

Population (2026-01-01)
  - Total: 242
  - Density: 155/km^{2} (402/sq mi)
- Time zone: UTC+1 (CET)
  - Summer (DST): UTC+2 (CEST)
- Postal code: 273 51
- Website: www.pavlovukladna.cz

Pavlov (Czech pronunciation: [ˈpavlof]; German: Paulow) is a municipality and village in Kladno District in the Central Bohemian Region of the Czech Republic. It has about 200 inhabitants.

== Geography ==
Pavlov is located about 5 kilometres (3 mi) southeast of Kladno and 11 km (7 mi) west of Prague. It lies in a flat agricultural landscape of the Prague Plateau.

== History ==
The first written mention of Pavlov is from 1519, when there was a farm owned by the Saint Vitus Chapter in Hostouň. In 1726, the then-owner Ferdinand Kustod of Zubří and Lipka administratively connected 10 houses and a brewery from the surrounding settlements to the farm and created the Nový Dvůr manor.

After the manor changed hands several times, it was bought by Leopold Paul in 1799. He had built a manor house and a settlement next to the farm, and named it after himself Pavlov (Paulow in German).

== Demographics ==
Historical population

Year	Pop.	±%
1869	291	—
1880	277	−4.8%
1890	338	+22.0%
1900	360	+6.5%
1910	328	−8.9%

Year	Pop.	±%
1921	348	+6.1%
1930	311	−10.6%
1950	233	−25.1%
1961	221	−5.2%
1970	201	−9.0%

Year	Pop.	±%
1980	168	−16.4%
1991	116	−31.0%
2001	98	−15.5%
2011	143	+45.9%
2021	201	+40.6%

Source: Censuses

== Transport ==
The D6 motorway from Prague to Karlovy Vary runs through the northern part of the municipality.

Pavlov is located on the railway line Prague–Kladno.

== Sights ==
The only protected cultural monument in the municipality is a small castle from the early 19th century.
