= Mount Pavlof =

Active volcano in Alaska, United States

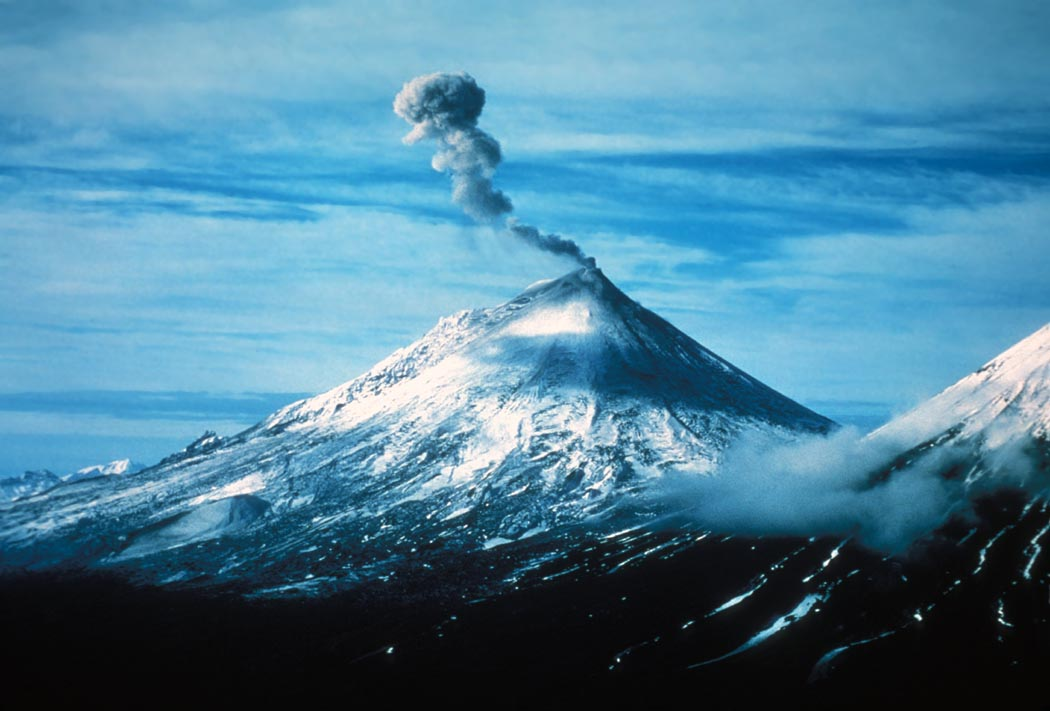
- Steam and volcanic gas rising from the summit crater of Pavlof Volcano in 2004

Highest point
- Elevation: 8,251 ft (2,515 m)
- Prominence: 8,225 ft (2,507 m)
- Listing: North America prominent 35th
- Coordinates: 55°25′10″N 161°53′42″W

Geography
- Location within Alaska
- Interactive map of Mount Pavlof
- Location: Alaska Peninsula, Alaska, U.S.
- Parent range: Aleutian Range
- Topo map: USGS Port Moller B-6

Geology
- Formed by: Subduction zone volcanism
- Mountain type: Stratovolcano
- Volcanic arc: Aleutian Arc
- Last eruption: 2022

Climbing
- First ascent: June 27, 1928 by T. A. Jagger, J. Gardiner, O. P. McKinley, P. A. Yatchmenoff, R. H. Stewart
- Easiest route: Northwest Face: snow/glacier climb

Mount Pavlof or Pavlof Volcano is a stratovolcano of the Aleutian Range on the Alaska Peninsula. It has been one of the most active volcanoes in the United States since 1980, with eruptions recorded in 1980, 1981, 1983, 1986–1988, 1996–1997, 2007, 2013, twice in 2014, 2016, and again in 2021-2022. It is not currently erupting (as of October 15, 2024). The most common lava type here is basaltic andesite and the 2013-2014 lavas contained approximately 53 wt.% SiO_{2}. The volcano is monitored by the Alaska Volcano Observatory- a joint program of the United States Geological Survey (USGS), the Geophysical Institute of the University of Alaska Fairbanks (UAFGI), and the State of Alaska Division of Geological and Geophysical Surveys (ADGGS). With a threat score of 95, the threat from future eruptions is considered to be high; much of this threat comes from the possibility of disruption of nearby air routes by large releases of ash. The mountain shares a name with the nearby Pavlof Sister, which is thought to have last erupted from 1762 to 1786, although this period of activity is sometimes attributed to Pavlof volcano instead.

== Volcanic activity ==
After its eruption in 1996, the volcano entered a period of dormancy, the longest it had been dormant since records of its eruptions have been kept. This period ended on August 15, 2007, with the start of a new eruption involving seismic disturbances and a "vigorous eruption of lava." Scientists said that the volcano "could be working toward a massive eruption that could affect air travel but was not expected to threaten any of the towns in the area." The eruption ended on September 13. The volcano erupted again on May 13, 2013, but activity had greatly diminished by July 3, 2013, and on August 8, 2013, the Current Volcano Alert Level was reduced to NORMAL and the Current Aviation Color Code reduced to GREEN.

A low-level eruption began on May 31, 2014. On June 2 seismic activity intensified and officials raised the alert level from "Watch" to "Warning" and the aviation color code from "Orange" to "Red" after pilots in the area reported an ash plume that reached as high as 22,000 feet above sea level.

A new eruption began on March 27, 2016, sending an ash cloud to 37,000 feet above sea level, extending 400 miles NE. The volcano gave 25 minutes warning before the onset of the eruption. The alert level was raised to "Warning" and the aviation color code was raised to "Red", which indicates incoming eruption with high levels of ash. The nearby village of Nelson Lagoon was coated with tephra during the powerful eruption. The volcano stopped emitting ash clouds on March 31, 2016.

== Climbing history ==
The first recorded ascent of Pavlof Volcano was on June 27, 1928, by T. A. Jagger, J. Gardiner, O. P. McKinley, P. A. Yatchmenoff and R. H. Stewart, although "speculation surrounds this ascent, which was recounted in National Geographic." The straightforward nature of the climb suggests that an earlier unrecorded ascent may have occurred. The second ascent was in June 1950 by T. P. Bank.

The main challenge of climbing this peak is its remoteness and the consequent difficulty of access. The peak is a 30 mi (48 km) journey from the north side of Cold Bay. The climb itself is a straightforward snow climb, and the ski descent is recommended.

== Gallery ==
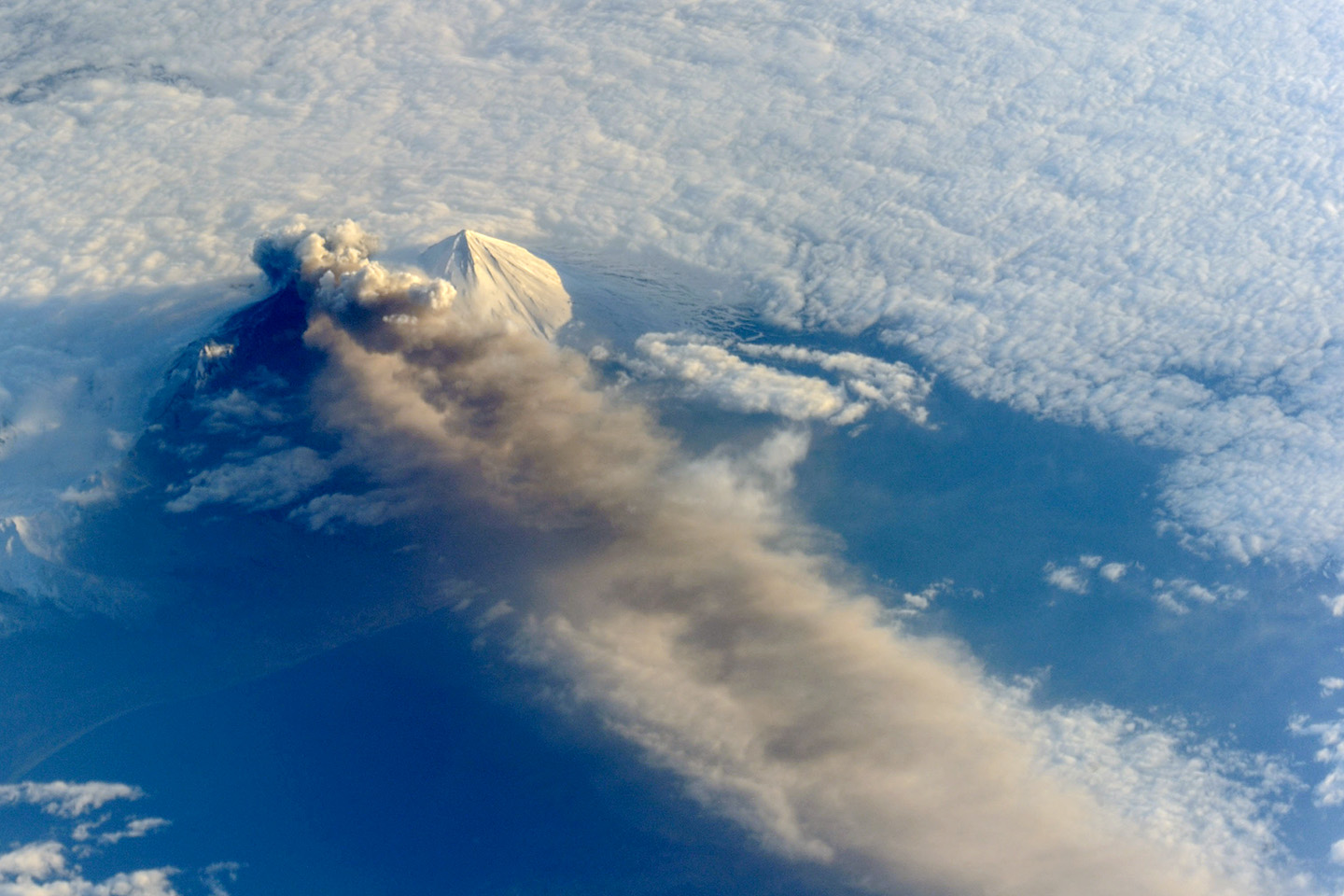
Pavlof 2013 eruption from space

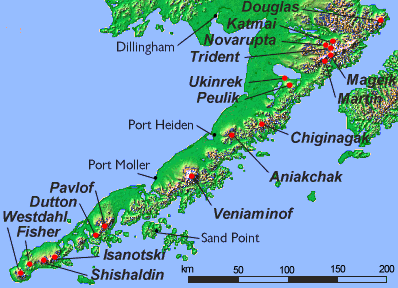
Map showing volcanoes of Alaska Peninsula

== See also ==
- List of mountain peaks of Alaska
- List of volcanoes in the United States
