= Pavlov (Šumperk District) =

- Municipality
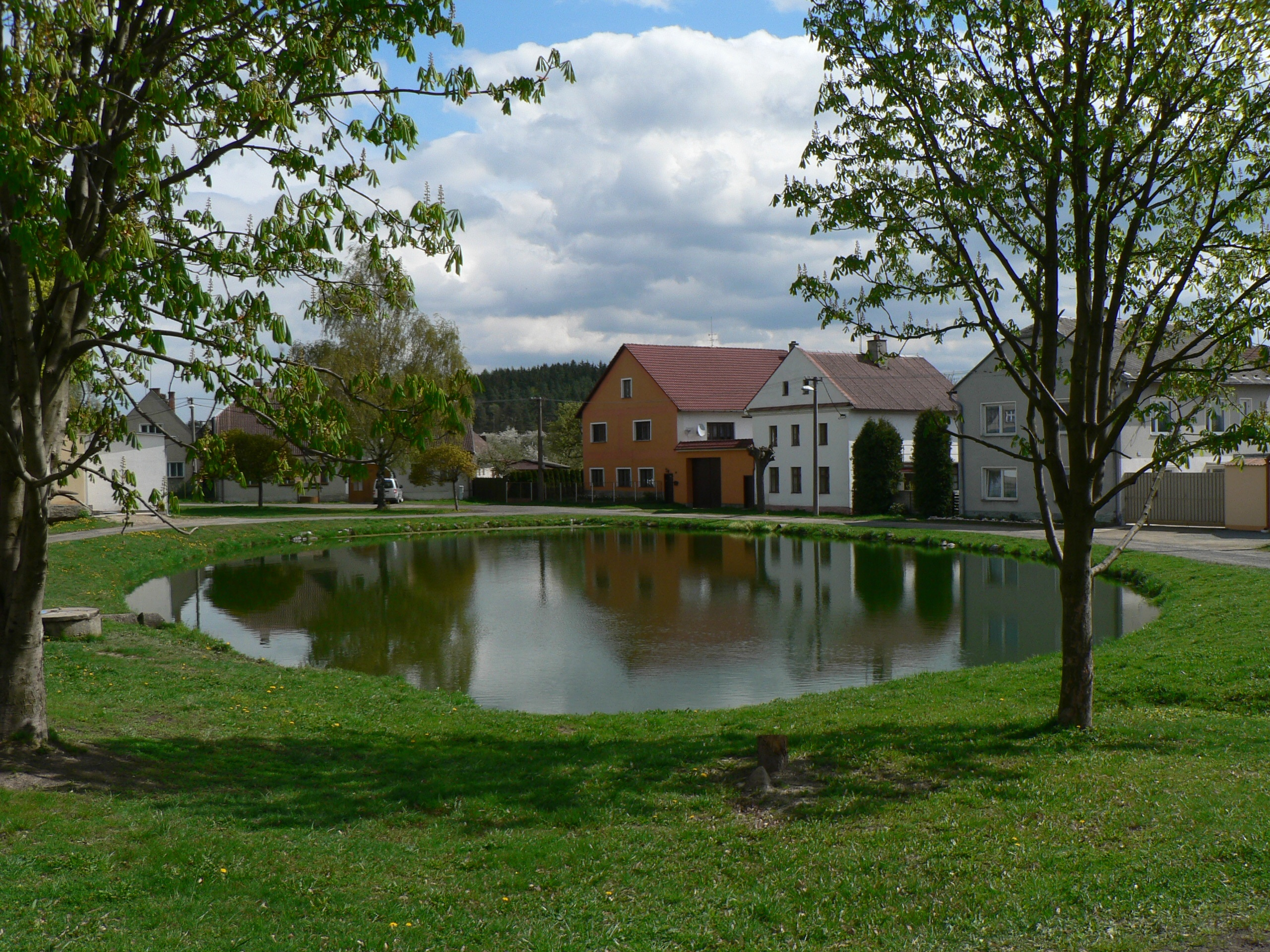
- Centre of Pavlov

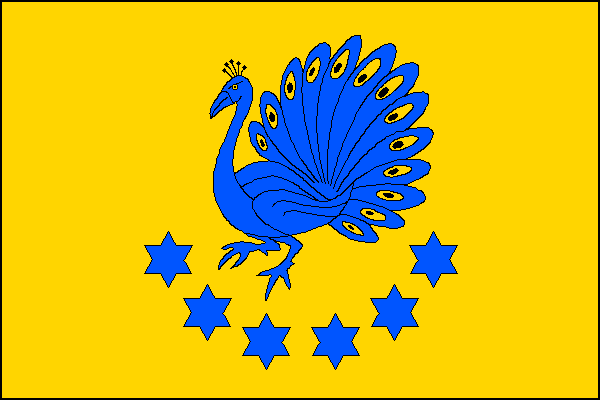
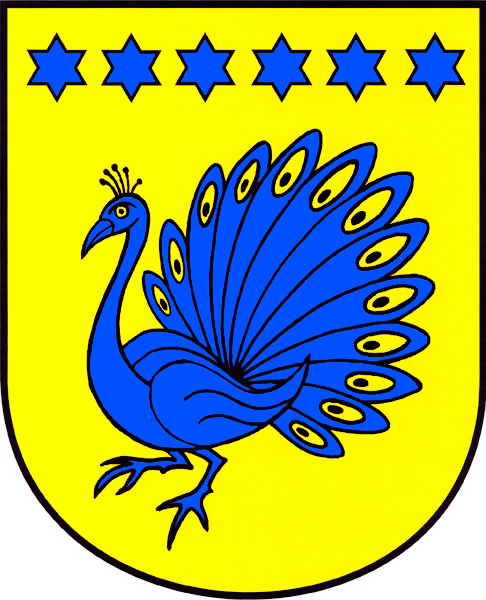
- Flag Coat of arms

- Location in the Czech Republic
- Coordinates: 49°44′34″N 16°52′45″E
- Country: Czech Republic
- Region: Olomouc
- District: Šumperk
- First mentioned: 1323

Area
  - Total: 24.06 km^{2} (9.29 sq mi)
- Elevation: 347 m (1,138 ft)

Population (2026-01-01)
  - Total: 663
  - Density: 27.6/km^{2} (71.4/sq mi)
- Time zone: UTC+1 (CET)
  - Summer (DST): UTC+2 (CEST)
- Postal codes: 789 85
- Website: www.pavlovulostic.cz

Pavlov is a municipality and village in Šumperk District in the Olomouc Region of the Czech Republic. It has about 700 inhabitants.

Pavlov lies approximately 26 kilometres (16 mi) south of Šumperk, 32 km (20 mi) north-west of Olomouc, and 181 km (112 mi) east of Prague.

== Administrative division ==
Pavlov consists of three municipal parts (in brackets population according to the 2021 census):

- Pavlov (479)
- Radnice (92)
- Veselí (81)

== Demographics ==
Historical population
| Year | Pop. | ±% |
|---|---|---|
| 1869 | 1,304 | — |
| 1880 | 1,321 | +1.3% |
| 1890 | 1,290 | −2.3% |
| 1900 | 1,259 | −2.4% |
| 1910 | 1,215 | −3.5% |
| 1921 | 1,201 | −1.2% |
| 1930 | 1,143 | −4.8% |
| 1950 | 799 | −30.1% |
| 1961 | 811 | +1.5% |
| 1970 | 728 | −10.2% |
| 1980 | 689 | −5.4% |
| 1991 | 580 | −15.8% |
| 2001 | 585 | +0.9% |
| 2011 | 587 | +0.3% |
| 2021 | 652 | +11.1% |
Source: Censuses
