= Nikolay Pavlov =

Nikolay Pavlov may refer to:

- Nikolay Pavlov (volleyball), Russian volleyball player
- Nikolay Pavlov (footballer), Bulgarian footballer
- Nikolai Pavlov (writer), Russian writer
- Nikolay Pavlov, co-chairman of the Russian National Salvation Front
- Nikolay Pavlov (politician), member of Central Committee elected by the 27th Congress of the Communist Party of the Soviet Union

== See also ==
- Nikolay Pavlov-Pianov, Russian chess master
- Mykola Pavlov (born 1954), former Ukrainian football defender
