= Pavlov (Žďár nad Sázavou District) =

- Municipality
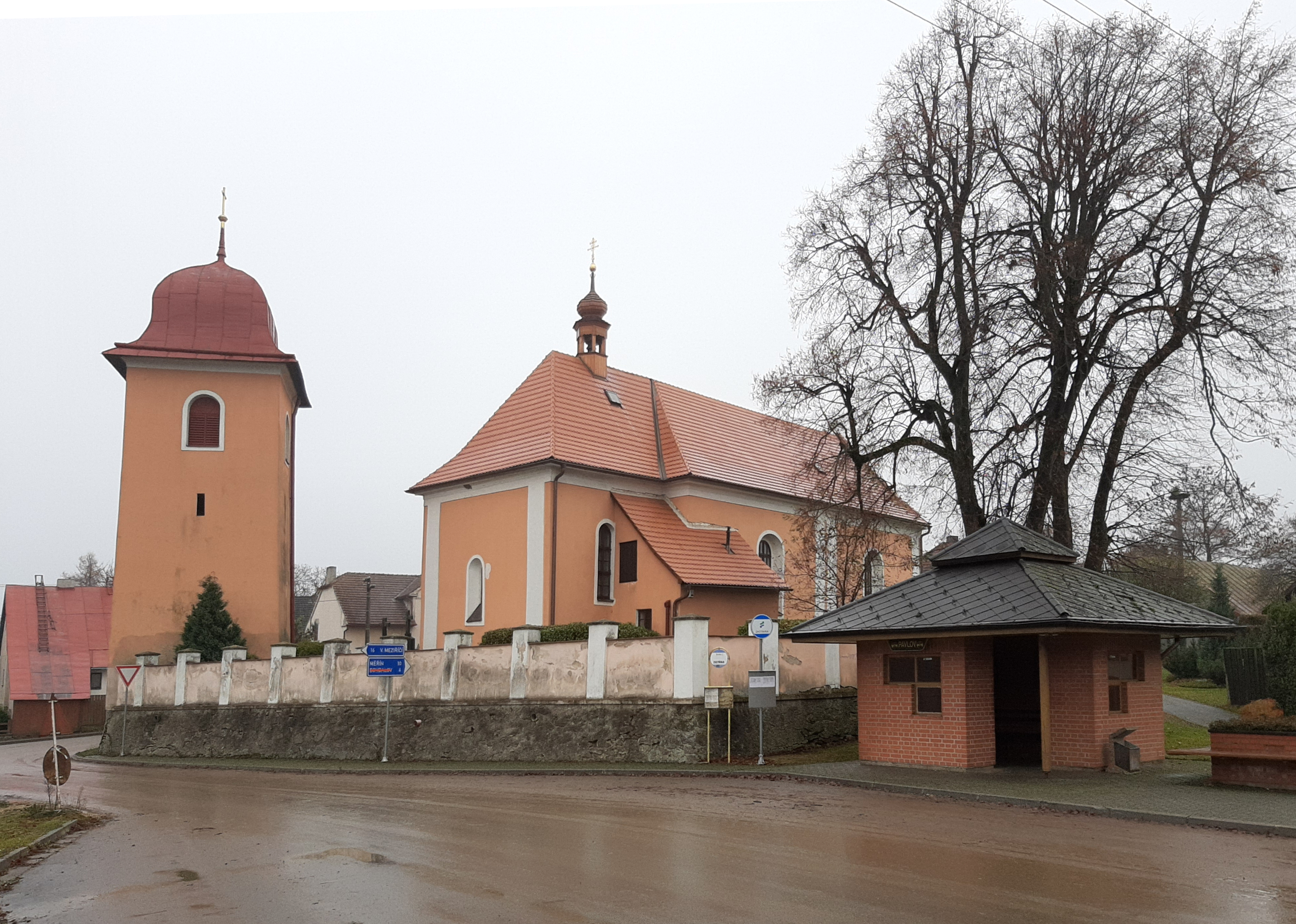
- Church of Saints James and Philip

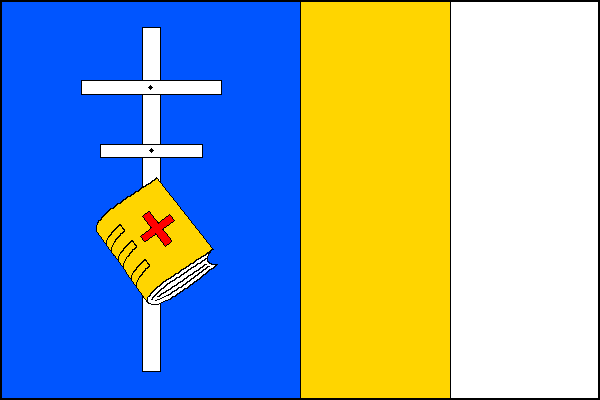
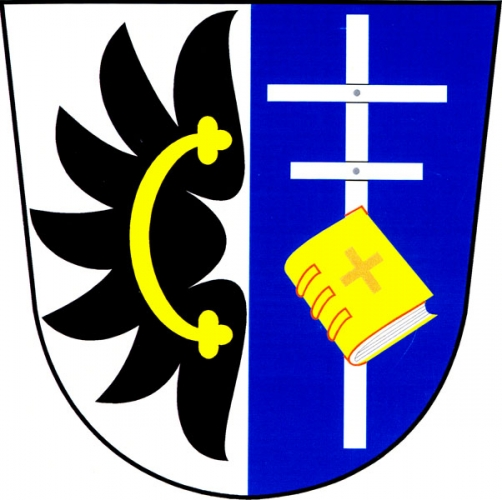
- Flag Coat of arms

- Location in the Czech Republic
- Coordinates: 49°27′3″N 15°54′50″E
- Country: Czech Republic
- Region: Vysočina
- District: Žďár nad Sázavou
- First mentioned: 1370

Area
  - Total: 11.63 km^{2} (4.49 sq mi)
- Elevation: 574 m (1,883 ft)

Population (2026-01-01)
  - Total: 347
  - Density: 29.8/km^{2} (77.3/sq mi)
- Time zone: UTC+1 (CET)
  - Summer (DST): UTC+2 (CEST)
- Postal code: 594 44
- Website: www.pavlovzr.cz

Pavlov is a municipality and village in Žďár nad Sázavou District in the Vysočina Region of the Czech Republic. It has about 300 inhabitants.

Pavlov lies approximately 13 kilometres (8 mi) south of Žďár nad Sázavou, 25 km (16 mi) east of Jihlava, and 129 km (80 mi) south-east of Prague.

== Administrative division ==
Pavlov consists of two municipal parts (in brackets population according to the 2021 census):

- Pavlov (322)
- Starý Telečkov (4)

== Demographics ==
Historical population
Year	Pop.	±%
1869	508	—
1880	584	+15.0%
1890	578	−1.0%
1900	546	−5.5%
1910	488	−10.6%
1921	496	+1.6%
1930	513	+3.4%
1950	411	−19.9%
1961	403	−1.9%
1970	384	−4.7%
1980	356	−7.3%
1991	362	+1.7%
2001	329	−9.1%
2011	318	−3.3%
2021	326	+2.5%
Source: Censuses
