= Pavlov's dog (disambiguation) =

Pavlov's Dog is classical conditioning, originally experiments using dogs by the Russian physiologist Ivan Pavlov. In 1904, Pavlov was awarded the Nobel Prize for his physiology work.

Pavlov's Dog may also refer to:

- Pavlov's Dog (band), an American band
- Pavlov's Dogs (film), a 2005 Finnish documentary film
- "Pavlov's Dogs", a song by Rorschach
- "Pavlov's Dawgs", an album by German thrash metal band Tankard
