= Pavlov, Russia =

Pavlov (Russian: Павлов, masculine) or Pavlova (Павлова, feminine or masculine genitive) is the name of several rural localities in Russia.

== Modern localities ==
- Pavlov, Bryansk Oblast, a settlement in Krasnovichsky Rural Administrative Okrug of Unechsky District in Bryansk Oblast; 52°56′N 32°35′E
- Pavlov, Belokalitvinsky District, Rostov Oblast, a khutor in Nizhnepopovskoye Rural Settlement of Belokalitvinsky District in Rostov Oblast
- Pavlov, Morozovsky District, Rostov Oblast, a khutor in Shiroko-Atamanovskoye Rural Settlement of Morozovsky District in Rostov Oblast
- Pavlov, Semikarakorsky District, Rostov Oblast, a khutor in Zolotarevskoye Rural Settlement of Semikarakorsky District in Rostov Oblast
- Pavlova, Moscow Oblast, a settlement in Ramenskoye Rural Settlement of Yegoryevsky District in Moscow Oblast
- Pavlova, Oryol Oblast, a village in Gnezdilovsky Selsoviet of Bolkhovsky District in Oryol Oblast

== Alternative names ==
- Pavlova, alternative name of Pavlovo, a village in Smetaninsky Rural Okrug of Sanchursky District in Kirov Oblast; 56°54′N 47°12′E
- Pavlova, alternative name of Pavlovo, a village in Parfenyevskoye Settlement of Parfenyevsky District in Kostroma Oblast; 58°32′N 43°31′E
- Pavlova, alternative name of Pavlovo, a village in Nezhnovskoye Settlement Municipal Formation of Kingiseppsky District in Leningrad Oblast; 59°41′N 28°48′E
- Pavlova, alternative name of Pavlovo, a selo in Koltushskoye Settlement Municipal Formation of Vsevolozhsky District in Leningrad Oblast; 59°56′N 30°39′E
