= Mikhail Pavlov (scientist) =

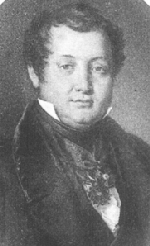
Mikhail Grigoryevich Portrait

Mikhail Grigoryevich Pavlov (Russian Михаил Григорьевич Павлов) (12 November [O.S. 1 November] 1792 – 21 April [O.S. 9 April] 1840) was a Russian academic, largely responsible for spreading the philosophical ideas of the Naturphilosophie of Schelling in Russia. He was a professor at Moscow University.

He graduated from Moscow University in 1815. After a doctorate in medicine, and two years travelling in Europe to study science, he was given a chair in Moscow in 1821, in Agriculture, Mineralogy and Forestry. Subsequently he wrote textbooks in agriculture and chemistry, and lobbied for changed agricultural practices.

Schelling appears as a kind of absentee grand master of a new higher order. The most popular university lecturer of the period, Professor Pavlov, was master of ceremonies, greeting students at the door of his lecture hall with his famous question: "You want to know about nature, but what is nature and what is knowledge?"
