= Igors Pavlovs =

Latvian ice hockey player

- Born: 1 January 1965 (age 61) Lipetsk, Russian SFSR, USSR
- Height: 5 ft 10 in (178 cm)
- Weight: 185 lb (84 kg; 13 st 3 lb)
- Position: Forward
- Shot: right
- Played for: Dynamo Kharkov; Dinamo Riga; Stars Riga; HC Vitkovice; EV Landsberg; EHC Freiburg; ECR Revier Löwen; Kölner Haie
- National team: Latvia
- Playing career: 1984–2001

Igors Pavlovs (born 1 January 1965 in Lipetsk, Russian SFSR, USSR) is a retired professional Latvian ice hockey player. During his career he played for Dinamo Riga and later for various hockey teams in Germany. He also represented Latvia at an international level.

== Coaching career ==
After retiring as player Pavlovs became the coach of Krefeld Pinguine until he left on 29 April 2009, to join Kölner Haie who released him on 2 December 2009. In 2010-11 season he became an assistant coach for Sibir of KHL. In October 2010, Pavlovs was named head coach of Spartak Moscow after Milos Rziga was fired due to a poor start to the season. In December, after suffering a serious illness, and the team results not improving, Pavlovs was released from his post and named team scout. In February, 2011, Pavlovs became head coach of Rapperswil-Jona Lakers

=== Coaching Clubs ===
- 2001-2002: Revier Löwen Oberhausen (assistant coach)
- 2002-2005: REV Bremerhaven (assistant coach)
- 2005-2007: REV Bremerhaven (head coach)
- 2007-2008: EV Regensburg
- 2008-2009: Krefeld Pinguine
- 2009: Kölner Haie
- 2010: HC Spartak Moscow
