= List of rural localities in Amur Oblast =

Map of Russia with Amur Oblast highlighted

This is a list of rural localities in Amur Oblast. Amur Oblast (Russian: Аму́рская о́бласть, romanized: Amurskaya oblast, IPA: [ɐˈmurskəjə ˈobləsʲtʲ]) is a federal subject of Russia (an oblast), located on the banks of the Amur and Zeya Rivers in the Russian Far East. The administrative center of the oblast, is the city of Blagoveshchensk. As of the 2010 Census, the oblast's population was 830,103.

== Arkharinsky District ==
Rural localities in Arkharinsky District:

- Antonovka
- Arkadyevka
- Boguchan
- Bon
- Chernigovka
- Chernoberyozovka
- Domikan
- Domikan
- Gribovka
- Gulikovka
- Innokentyevka
- Kamenka
- Kamenny Karyer
- Kasatkino
- Kazachy
- Kazanovka
- Krasnaya Gorka
- Krasny Istok
- Krasny Luch
- Kulustay
- Kundur
- Leninskoye
- Levy Bereg
- Mikhaylovka
- Mogilyovka
- Novodomikan
- Novopokrovka
- Novosergeyevka
- Novospassk
- Orlovka
- Otvazhnoye
- Petropavlovka
- Rachi
- Sagibovo
- Severnoye
- Svobodnoye
- Tatakan
- Uril
- Volnoye
- Yadrino
- Yerakhta
- Yesaulovka
- Zarechnoye
- Zhuravli
- Zhuravlyovka

== Belogorsky District ==
Rural localities in Belogorsky District:

- Amurskoye
- Belotserkovka
- Chernetcheno
- Dubrovka
- Kamyshevka
- Kiseleozyorka
- Klyuchi
- Komissarovka
- Krugloye
- Kustanayevka
- Lokhvitsy
- Lozovoye
- Lugovoye
- Lukyanovka
- Mezhdugranka
- Mirnoye
- Mostovoye
- Nekrasovka
- Nikolskoye
- Novoandreyevka
- Novonazarovka
- Novoselitba
- Novoye
- Ozeryane
- Pavlovka
- Polyanoye
- Prigorodnoye
- Savelyevka
- Svetilovka
- Tomichi
- Uspenovka
- Vasilyevka
- Velikoknyazevka
- Vozzhayevka
- Zakharyevka
- Zarechnoye

== Blagoveshchensk Urban Okrug ==
Rural localities in Blagoveshchensk Urban Okrug:

- Belogorye (station)
- Belogorye (village)
- Mukhinka
- Plodopitomnik
- Prizeyskaya
- Sadovoye

== Blagoveshchensky District ==
Rural localities in Blagoveshchensky District:

- Bibikovo
- Chigiri
- Dronovo
- Gribskoye
- Grodekovo
- Gryaznushka
- Ignatyevo
- Kanikurgan
- Kanton-Kommuna
- Markovo
- Mikhaylovka
- Natalyino
- Novinka
- Novopetrovka
- Novotroitskoye
- Peredovoye
- Pryadchino
- Rovnoye
- Sergeyevka
- Udobnoye
- Ust-Ivanovka
- Vadimovo
- Verkhneblagoveshchenskoye
- Vladimirovka
- Volkovo
- Yegoryevka
- Zarechny

== Bureysky District ==
Rural localities in Bureysky District:

- Alexeyevka
- Astashikha
- Bezozyornoye
- Bezymyannoye
- Doldykan
- Gomelevka
- Kivdo-Tyukan
- Malinovka
- Muravka
- Nikolayevka
- Pravaya Raychikha
- Rodionovka
- Semyonovka
- Staraya Raychikha
- Tryokhrechye
- Tyukan
- Uspenovka
- Ust-Kivda
- Vinogradovka

== Ivanovsky District ==
Rural localities in Ivanovsky District:

- Andreyevka
- Annovka
- Berezovka
- Bogorodskoye
- Bogoslovka
- Bolsheozyorka
- Cheremkhovo
- Cherkasovka
- Dmitriyevka
- Ivanovka
- Konstantinogradovka
- Kreshchenovka
- Lugovoye
- Nadezhdenskoye
- Nekrasovka
- Nikolayevka
- Novoalexeyevka
- Novopokrovka
- Petropavlovka
- Polevoye
- Pravovostochnoye
- Priozernoye
- Rakitnoye
- Sadovoye
- Semiozyorka
- Solnechnoye
- Srednebelaya
- Srednebeloye
- Troitskoye
- Uspenovka
- Vishnevka
- Voznesenovka
- Yerkovtsy

== Konstantinovsky District ==
Rural localities in Konstantinovsky District:

- Klyuchi
- Konstantinovka
- Kovrizhka
- Krestovozdvizhenka
- Nizhnaya Poltavka
- Novopetrovka
- Novotroitskoye
- Oktyabrskoye
- Orlovka
- Semidomka
- Srednyaya Poltavka
- Verkhny Urtuy
- Verkhnyaya Poltavka
- Voykovo
- Zenkovka
- Zolotonozhka

== Magdagachinsky District ==
Rural localities in Magdagachinsky District:

- Aprelsky
- Chalgany
- Chernyaevo
- Daktuy
- Gonzha
- Gudachi
- Kisly Klyuch
- Krasnaya Pad
- Kuznetsovo
- Pioner
- Sulus
- Tolbuzino
- Tygda
- Tymersol

== Mazanovsky District ==
Rural localities in Mazanovsky District:

- Abaykan
- Alexeyevka
- Antonovka
- Beloyarovo
- Bichura
- Bogoslovka
- Dmitriyevka
- Druzhnoye
- Ivanovsky
- Kamenka
- Kanichi
- Khristinovka
- Koltsovka
- Kozlovka
- Krasnoyarovo
- Leontyevka
- Margaritovka
- Maysky
- Mazanovo
- Mikhaylovka
- Molchanovo
- Novokiyevka
- Novokiyevsky Uval
- Novorossiyka
- Pautovka
- Petrovka
- Pionersky
- Popovka
- Praktichi
- Putyatino
- Razdolnoye
- Romankautsy
- Sapronovo
- Slava
- Sokhatino
- Taskino
- Uglovoye
- Ulma
- Yubileynoye

== Mikhaylovsky District ==
Rural localities in Mikhaylovsky District:

- Arsentyevka
- Cheremisino
- Chesnokovo
- Dim
- Dubovoye
- Kalinino
- Kavkaz
- Korshunovka
- Krasnaya Orlovka
- Krasny Vostok
- Krasny Yar
- Kupriyanovo
- Mikhaylovka
- Nizhnaya Ilyinovka
- Nizhnezavitinka
- Novochesnokovo
- Novogeorgiyevka
- Petropavlovka
- Poyarkovo
- Privolnoye
- Shadrino
- Shumilovka
- Shurino
- Vinnikovo
- Voskresenovka (station)
- Voskresenovka (village)
- Vysokoye
- Yaroslavka
- Zelyony Bor

== Oktyabrsky District ==
Rural localities in Oktyabrsky District:

- Belyakovka
- Borisoglebka
- Borisovo
- Cheremushki
- Georgiyevka
- Ilyinovka
- Kharkovka
- Koroli
- Kutilovo
- Maksimovka
- Maryanovka
- Mukhinsky
- Nagorny
- Nikolo-Alexandrovka
- Novomikhaylovka
- Panino
- Pereyaslovka
- Peschanoozerka
- Pokrovka
- Preobrazhenovka
- Pribrezhny
- Romanovka
- Sergeye-Fyodorovka
- Smeloye
- Smirnovka
- Troyebratka
- Trudovoy
- Uvalny
- Varvarovka
- Vostochny
- Yasnaya Polyana
- Yekaterinoslavka
- Yuzhny
- Zaozerny

== Progress urban okrug ==
Rural localities in Progress urban okrug:

- Kivdinsky

== Raychikhinsk urban okrug ==
Rural localities in Raychikhinsk urban okrug:

- Shiroky
- Ugolnoye
- Zelvino

== Romnensky District ==
Rural localities in Romnensky District:

- Amaranka
- Bratolyubovka
- Chergali
- Dalnevostochnoye
- Grigoryevka
- Kakhovka
- Kalinovka
- Klimovka
- Kokhlatskoye
- Kuzmichi
- Lyubimoye
- Morozovka
- Novonikolayevka
- Novorossiyka
- Novy Byt
- Pozdeyevka
- Pridorozhnoye
- Raygorodka
- Rogozovka
- Romny
- Seredinnoye
- Smolyanoye
- Svyatorussovka
- Urozhaynoye
- Verkhnebeloye
- Vostochnaya Niva
- Voznesenovka
- Vysokoye
- Znamenka

== Selemdzhinsky District ==
Rural localities in Selemdzhinsky District:

- Byssa
- Fevralskoye
- Isa
- Ivanovskoye
- Koboldo
- Norsk
- Ogodzha
- Olginsk
- Selemdzhinsk
- Stoyba
- Zlatoutovsk

== Seryshevsky District ==
Rural localities in Seryshevsky District:

- Arga
- Avtonomovka
- Belogorka
- Belonogovo
- Belousovka
- Birma
- Blizhny Sakhalin
- Bochkaryovka
- Bolshaya Sazanka
- Borispol
- Derzhavinka
- Dobryanka
- Frolovka
- Kazanka
- Khitrovka
- Klyuchiki
- Krasnaya Polyana
- Lebyazhye
- Lermontovo
- Limannoye
- Lipovka
- Milekhino
- Novookhochye
- Novosergeyevka
- Ozernoye
- Parunovka
- Pavlovka
- Polyana
- Rozhdestvenka
- Shiroky Log
- Sokolovka
- Sosnovka
- Sretenka
- Tavrichanka
- Tomskoye
- Udarnoye
- Ukraina
- Ukrainka
- Verkhneborovaya
- Vernoye
- Vesyoloye
- Vodorazdelnoye
- Voronzha
- Voskresenovka
- Vvedenovka

== Shimanovsky District ==
Rural localities in Shimanovsky District:

- Aktay
- Anosovo
- Bazisnoye
- Bereya
- Chagoyan
- Dzhatva
- Klyuchevoye
- Kukhterin Lug
- Malinovka
- Mukhino
- Novogeorgiyevka
- Novovoskresenovka
- Pereselenets
- Petrushi
- Petrushi
- Razdolnoye
- Saskal
- Seletkan
- Svetilnoye
- Svobodny Trud
- Uralovka
- Ushakovo

== Skovorodinsky District ==
Rural localities in Skovorodinsky District:

- Albazino
- Ayachi
- Bam
- Bolshaya Omutnaya
- Dzhalinda
- Gluboky
- Ignashino
- Itashino
- Lesnoy
- Madalan
- Never
- Oldoy
- Orochensky
- Osezhino
- Segachama
- Sgibeyevo
- Solnechny
- Srednereynovsky
- Takhtamygda
- Taldan
- Tayozhny
- Ulruchyi
- Ulyagir

== Svobodnensky District ==
Rural localities in Svobodnensky District:

- Bardagon
- Busse
- Buzuli
- Chembary
- Chernigovka
- Chernovka
- Dmitriyevka
- Gashchenka
- Glukhari
- Goluboye
- Guran
- Istochny
- Klimoutsy
- Kostyukovka
- Kurgan
- Malaya Sazanka
- Maly Ergel
- Markuchi
- Moskvitino
- Nizhniye Buzuli
- Novgorodka
- Novoivanovka
- Novonikolsk
- Novoostropol
- Novostepanovka
- Petropavlovka
- Podgorny
- Razlivnaya
- Rogachevka
- Semyonovka
- Serebryanka
- Sukromli
- Sychovka
- Talali
- Ust-Pyora
- Yukhta
- Yukhta-3
- Zagan
- Zagornaya Selitba
- Zheltoyarovo
- Zigovka

== Tambovsky District ==
Rural localities in Tambovsky District:

- Chuyevka
- Dukhovskoye
- Gilchin
- Korfovo
- Kositsino
- Kozmodemyanovka
- Krasnoye
- Kuropatino
- Lazarevka
- Lermontovka
- Limannoye
- Lipovka
- Lozovoye
- Muravyevka
- Orletskoye
- Pridorozhnoye
- Razdolnoye
- Rezunovka
- Roshchino
- Sadovoye
- Svobodka
- Tambovka
- Tolstovka
- Zharikovo

== Tyndinsky District ==
Rural localities in Tyndinsky District:

- Anosovsky
- Belenky
- Bugorki
- Chilchi
- Dipkun
- Khorogochi
- Kuvykta
- Lapri
- Larba
- Lopcha
- Marevy
- Mogot
- Murtygit
- Olyokma
- Pervomayskoye
- Solovyovsk
- Strelka
- Tutaul
- Urkan
- Ust'-Nyukzha
- Ust-Urkima
- Vostochny
- Yankan
- Yuktali

== Zavitinsky District ==
Rural localities in Zavitinsky District:

- Albazinka
- Antonovka
- Avramovka
- Bely Yar
- Boldyrevka
- Chervonaya Armiya
- Demyanovka
- Deya
- Fyodorovka
- Innokentyevka
- Ivanovka
- Kamyshenka
- Kupriyanovka
- Lenino
- Novoalexeyevka
- Platovo
- Podolovka
- Preobrazhenovka
- Uspenovka
- Valuyevo
- Verkhneilyinovka

== Zeysky District ==
Rural localities in Zeysky District:

- Alexandrovka
- Alexeyevka
- Algach
- Amuro-Baltiysk
- Beregovoy
- Berezovka
- Bomnak
- Chalbachi
- Dugda
- Gorny
- Gulik
- Ivanovka
- Khvoyny
- Kirovsky
- Nikolayevka
- Nikolayevka-2
- Ogoron
- Oktyabrsky
- Ovsyanka
- Polyakovsky
- Rublyovka
- Sian
- Snezhnogorsky
- Sosnovy Bor
- Tungala
- Umlekan
- Verkhnezeysk
- Yasny
- Yubileyny
- Zarechnaya Sloboda
- Zolotaya Gora

== See also ==
- Lists of rural localities in Russia
