= Shiroky =

Shiroky may refer to:

- Shiroky, Amur Oblast, an urban-type settlement in Amur Oblast, Russia
- Shiroky, Magadan Oblast, an urban-type settlement in Magadan Oblast, Russia
