= Smeloye =

Smeloye Смелое
- Selo
- Location within Amur Oblast Location within Russia
- Coordinates: 49°21′N 130°06′E
- Country: Russia
- Region: Amur Oblast
- District: Oktyabrsky District
- Time zone: UTC+9:00

Smeloye (Russian: Смелое) is a rural locality (a selo) and the administrative center of Smelovsky Selsoviet of Oktyabrsky District, Amur Oblast, Russia. The population was 128 as of 2018. There are 14 streets.

== Geography ==
Smeloye is located 30 km northeast of Yekaterinoslavka (the district's administrative centre) by road. Yasnaya Polyana is the nearest rural locality.
