= Demyanovka =

Demyanovka Демьяновка
- Selo
- Location within Amur Oblast Location within Russia
- Coordinates: 49°57′N 129°14′E
- Country: Russia
- Region: Amur Oblast
- District: Zavitinsky District
- Time zone: UTC+9:00

Demyanovka (Russian: Демьяновка) is a rural locality (a selo) in Innokentyevsky Selsoviet of Zavitinsky District, Amur Oblast, Russia. The population was 105 as of 2018. There are 2 streets.

== Geography ==
Demyanovka is located 24 km southwest of Zavitinsk (the district's administrative centre) by road. Innokentyevka is the nearest rural locality.
