= Muravyevka =

Muravyevka Муравьёвка
- Selo
- Location within Amur Oblast Location within Russia
- Coordinates: 49°50′N 127°43′E
- Country: Russia
- Region: Amur Oblast
- District: Tambovsky District
- Time zone: UTC+9:00

Muravyevka (Russian: Муравьёвка) is a rural locality (a selo) and the administrative center of Muravyevsky Selsoviet of Tambovsky District, Amur Oblast, Russia. The population was 480 as of 2018. There are 12 streets.

== Geography ==
Muravyevka is located on the Gilchin River, 53 km southwest of Tambovka (the district's administrative centre) by road. Rezunovka is the nearest rural locality.
