= Belogorka, Amur Oblast =

Belogorka Белогорка
- Selo
- Location within Amur Oblast Location within Russia
- Coordinates: 50°55′N 128°36′E
- Country: Russia
- Region: Amur Oblast
- District: Seryshevsky District
- Time zone: UTC+9:00

Belogorka (Russian: Белогорка) is a rural locality (a selo) in Tomsky Selsoviet of Seryshevsky District, Amur Oblast, Russia. The population was 333 as of 2018. There are 2 streets.

== Geography ==
Belogorka is located 28 km southeast of Seryshevo (the district's administrative centre) by road. Khitrovka is the nearest rural locality.
