= Istochny =

Istochny Источный
- Settlement
- Location within Amur Oblast Location within Russia
- Coordinates: 51°06′N 127°57′E
- Country: Russia
- Region: Amur Oblast
- District: Svobodnensky District
- Time zone: UTC+9:00

Istochny (Russian: Источный) is a rural locality (a settlement) in Moskvitinsky Selsoviet of Svobodnensky District, Amur Oblast, Russia. The population was 70 as of 2018. There are 4 streets.

== Geography ==
Istochny is located on the bank of the Istok Lake, 40 km south of Svobodny (the district's administrative centre) by road. Moskvitino is the nearest rural locality.
