= Marevy =

Marevy Маревый
- Settlement
- Location within Amur Oblast Location within Russia
- Coordinates: 55°18′N 125°54′E
- Country: Russia
- Region: Amur Oblast
- District: Tyndinsky District
- Time zone: UTC+9:00

Marevy (Russian: Маревый) is a rural locality (a settlement) in Marevsky Selsoviet of Tyndinsky District, Amur Oblast, Russia. The population was 599 as of 2018. There are four streets.

== Geography ==
Marevy is located on the Gilyuy River, 95 km east of Tynda (the district's administrative centre) by road. Bestuzhevo is the nearest rural locality.
