= Orochensky =

Orochensky Ороченский
- Passing loop
- Location within Amur Oblast Location within Russia
- Coordinates: 54°00′N 121°51′E
- Country: Russia
- Region: Amur Oblast
- District: Skovorodinsky District
- Time zone: UTC+9:00

Orochensky (Russian: Ороченский) is an inhabited passing loop (Russian: железнодорожный разъезд) in the workers' settlement of Erofey Pavlovich, Skovorodinsky District, Amur Oblast, Russia. The population was 6 as of 2018.

== Geography ==
Orochensky is located 154 km west of Skovorodino (the district's administrative centre) by road. Yerovey Pavlovich is the nearest rural locality.
