= Lermontovo, Amur Oblast =

Lermontovo Лермонтово
- Selo
- Location within Amur Oblast Location within Russia
- Coordinates: 51°20′N 128°41′E
- Country: Russia
- Region: Amur Oblast
- District: Seryshevsky District
- Time zone: UTC+9:00

Lermontovo (Russian: Лермонтово) is a rural locality (a selo) and the administrative center of Lermontovsky Selsoviet of Seryshevsky District, Amur Oblast, Russia. The population was 254 as of 2018. There are 9 streets.

== Geography ==
Lermontovo is located 45 km northeast of Seryshevo (the district's administrative centre) by road. Pavlovka is the nearest rural locality.
