= Malaya Sazanka =

Malaya Sazanka Малая Сазанка
- Selo
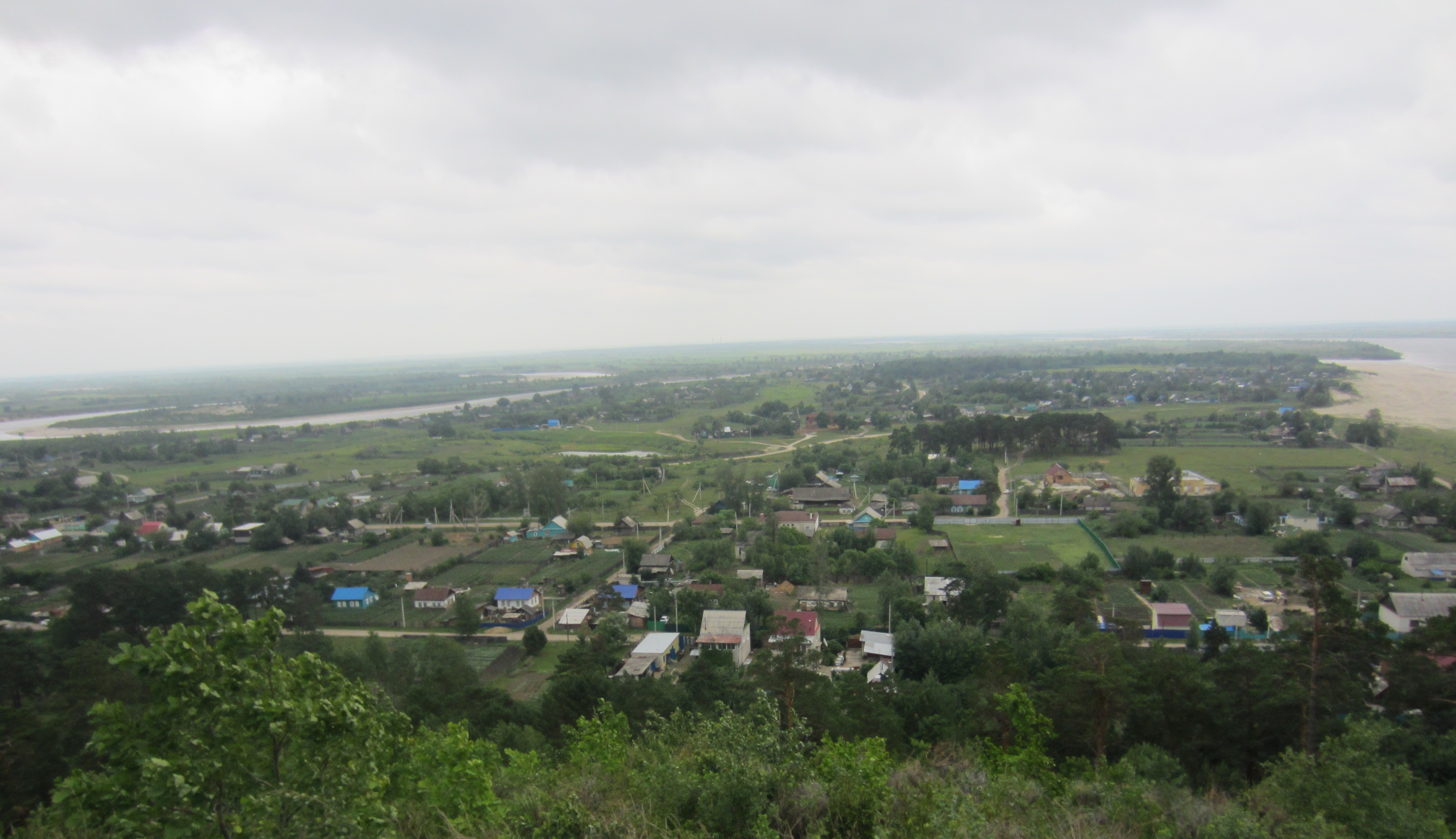

- Location within Amur Oblast Location within Russia
- Coordinates: 51°13′N 128°04′E
- Country: Russia
- Region: Amur Oblast
- District: Svobodnensky District
- Time zone: UTC+9:00

Malaya Sazanka (Russian: Малая Сазанка) is a rural locality (a selo) and the administrative center of Malasazansky Selsoviet of Svobodnensky District, Amur Oblast, Russia. The population was 1,857 as of 2018. There are 13 streets.

== Geography ==
Malaya Sazanka is located on the right bank of the Zeya River, 22 km south of Svobodny (the district's administrative centre) by road. Novgorodka is the nearest rural locality.
