= Zakharyevka =

Zakharyevka Захарьевка
- Selo
- Location within Amur Oblast Location within Russia
- Coordinates: 50°38′N 128°17′E
- Country: Russia
- Region: Amur Oblast
- District: Belogorsky District
- Time zone: UTC+9:00

Zakharyevka (Russian: Захарьевка) is a rural locality (a selo) in Nekrasovsky Selsoviet of Belogorsky District, Amur Oblast, Russia. The population was 20 as of 2018. There is one street.

== Geography ==
Zakharyevka is located on the right bank of the Belaya River, 44 km south of Belogorsk (the district's administrative centre) by road. Nekrasovka is the nearest rural locality.
