= Chernetcheno =

Chernetcheno Чернетчено
- Selo
- Location within Amur Oblast Location within Russia
- Coordinates: 50°36′N 128°31′E
- Country: Russia
- Region: Amur Oblast
- District: Belogorsky District
- Time zone: UTC+9:00

Chernetcheno (Russian: Чернетчено) is a rural locality (a selo) in Uspenovsky Selsoviet of Belogorsky District, Amur Oblast, Russia. The population was 47 as of 2018. There is 1 street.

== Geography ==
Chernetcheno is located on the right bank of the Belaya River, 159 km northeast of Belogorsk (the district's administrative centre) by road. Zarechnoye is the nearest rural locality.
