= Voskresenovka (station), Mikhaylovsky District, Amur Oblast =

Voskresenovka Воскресеновка
- Station
- Location within Amur Oblast Location within Russia
- Coordinates: 49°49′N 128°54′E
- Country: Russia
- Region: Amur Oblast
- District: Mikhaylovsky District
- Time zone: UTC+9:00

Voskresenovka (Russian: Воскресеновка) is a rural locality (a station) in Voskresenovsky Selsoviet of Mikhaylovsky District, Amur Oblast, Russia. The population was 98 as of 2018. There are 4 streets.

== Geography ==
The village is located 30 km from Poyarkovo.
