= Buzuli =

Buzuli Бузули
- Selo
- Location within Amur Oblast Location within Russia
- Coordinates: 51°37′N 128°11′E
- Country: Russia
- Region: Amur Oblast
- District: Svobodnensky District
- Time zone: UTC+9:00

Buzuli (Russian: Бузули) is a rural locality (a selo) in Chernovsky Selsoviet of Svobodnensky District, Amur Oblast, Russia. The population is 178 as of 2018. There are 2 streets.

== Geography ==
Buzuli is located on the right bank of the Bolshaya Pera River, 34 km north of Svobodny (the district's administrative centre) by road. Nizhniye Buzuli is the nearest rural locality.
