= Verkhneborovaya =

Verkhneborovaya Верхнеборовая
- Selo
- Location within Amur Oblast Location within Russia
- Coordinates: 51°10′N 129°02′E
- Country: Russia
- Region: Amur Oblast
- District: Seryshevsky District
- Time zone: UTC+9:00

Verkhneborovaya (Russian: Верхнеборовая) is a rural locality (a selo) in Sosnovsky Selsoviet of Seryshevsky District, Amur Oblast, Russia. The population was 36 as of 2018. There is 1 street.

== Geography ==
It is located 50 km from Seryshevo, 19 km from Sosnovka.
