= Kharkovka =

Kharkovka Харьковка
- Selo
- Location within Amur Oblast Location within Russia
- Coordinates: 50°08′N 129°04′E
- Country: Russia
- Region: Amur Oblast
- District: Oktyabrsky District
- Time zone: UTC+9:00

Kharkovka (Russian: Харьковка) is a rural locality (a selo) in Novomikhaylovsky Selsoviet of Oktyabrsky District, Amur Oblast, Russia. The population was 70 as of 2018. There is 1 street.

== Geography ==
Kharkovka is located on the right bank of the Zavitaya River, 42 km south of Yekaterinoslavka (the district's administrative centre) by road. Platovo is the nearest rural locality.
