= Gilchin =

Gilchin Гильчин
- Selo
- Location within Amur Oblast Location within Russia
- Coordinates: 49°54′N 127°51′E
- Country: Russia
- Region: Amur Oblast
- District: Tambovsky District
- Time zone: UTC+9:00

Gilchin (Russian: Гильчин) is a rural locality (a selo) in Razdolnensky Selsoviet of Tambovsky District, Amur Oblast, Russia. The population was 381 as of 2018. There are 6 streets.

== Geography ==
Gilchin is located on the Gilchin River, 34 km southwest of Tambovka (the district's administrative centre) by road. Razdolnoye is the nearest rural locality.
