= Anosovo =

Anosovo Аносово
- Selo
- Location within Amur Oblast Location within Russia
- Coordinates: 52°09′N 126°35′E
- Country: Russia
- Region: Amur Oblast
- District: Shimanovsky District
- Time zone: UTC+9:00

Anosovo (Russian: Аносово) is a rural locality (a selo) in Novovoskresenovsky Selsoviet of Shimanovsky District, Amur Oblast, Russia. The population was 96 as of 2018. There are two streets.

== Geography ==
Anosovo is located on the Ulmin River, 144 km northwest of Shimanovsk (the district's administrative centre) by road. Novovoskresenovka is the nearest rural locality.
