= Boguchan =

Boguchan Богучан
- Railway station settlement
- Location within Amur Oblast Location within Russia
- Coordinates: 49°17′N 130°15′E
- Country: Russia
- Region: Amur Oblast
- District: Arkharinsky District
- Time zone: UTC+9:00

Boguchan (Russian: Богучан) is a rural locality (a Railway station settlement) in Novosergeyevsky Selsoviet of Arkharinsky District, Amur Oblast, Russia. The population was 63 in 2018.

== Geography ==
Boguchan is located 28 km southeast of Arkhara (the district's administrative centre) by road. Kamenny Karyer is the nearest rural locality.
