= Krasnaya Pad =

Krasnaya Pad Красная Падь
- Settlement
- Location within Amur Oblast Location within Russia
- Coordinates: 53°26′N 126°00′E
- Country: Russia
- Region: Amur Oblast
- District: Magdagachinsky District
- Time zone: UTC+9:00

Krasnaya Pad (Russian: Красная Падь) is a rural locality (a settlement) in Rabochy posyolok Magdagachi of Magdagachinsky District, Amur Oblast, Russia. The population was 15 as of 2018.

== Geography ==
The village is located 15 km from Magdagachi.
