= Belotserkovka =

Belotserkovka Белоцерковка
- Selo
- Location within Amur Oblast Location within Russia
- Coordinates: 50°46′N 128°29′E
- Country: Russia
- Region: Amur Oblast
- District: Belogorsky District
- Time zone: UTC+9:00

Belotserkovka (Russian: Белоцерковка) is a rural locality (a selo) in Belotserkovsky Selsoviet of Belogorsky District, Amur Oblast, Russia. The population was 249 as of 2018. There are 3 streets.

== Geography ==
Belotserkovka is located 22 km south of Belogorsk (the district's administrative centre) by road. Prigorodnoye is the nearest rural locality.
