= Khorogochi =

Khorogochi Хорогочи
- Settlement
- Location within Amur Oblast Location within Russia
- Coordinates: 55°22′N 123°44′E
- Country: Russia
- Region: Amur Oblast
- District: Tyndinsky District
- Time zone: UTC+9:00

Khorogochi (Russian: Хорогочи) is a rural locality (a settlement) in Khorogochinsky Selsoviet of Tyndinsky District, Amur Oblast, Russia. The population was 347 as of 2018. There are 2 streets.

== Geography ==
Khorogochi is located 84 km northwest of Tynda (the district's administrative centre) by road. Kuvykta is the nearest rural locality.
