= Moskvitino =

Moskvitino Москвитино
- Selo
- Location within Amur Oblast Location within Russia
- Coordinates: 51°08′N 127°58′E
- Country: Russia
- Region: Amur Oblast
- District: Svobodnensky District
- Time zone: UTC+9:00 (CET)

Moskvitino (Russian: Москвитино) is a rural locality (a selo) and the administrative center of Moskvitinsky Selsoviet of Svobodnensky District, Amur Oblast, Russia. The population is 425 as of 2018.

== Geography ==
The village is located on the right bank of the Golubaya River, 2006 km north-west from Svobodny.
