= Gryaznushka =

Gryaznushka Грязнушка
- Selo
- Location within Amur Oblast Location within Russia
- Coordinates: 50°39′N 127°29′E
- Country: Russia
- Region: Amur Oblast
- District: Blagoveshchensky District
- Time zone: UTC+9:00

Gryaznushka (Russian: Грязнушка) is a rural locality (a selo) in Mikhaylovsky Selsoviet of Blagoveshchensky District, Amur Oblast, Russia. The population was 319 as of 2018. There are 5 streets.

== Geography ==
Gryaznushka is located on the bank of the Gryaznushka River, 62 km north of Blagoveshchensk (the district's administrative centre) by road. Mikhaylovka is the nearest rural locality.
