= Mazanovo =

Mazanovo Мазаново
- Selo
- Location within Amur Oblast Location within Russia
- Coordinates: 51°37′N 128°49′E
- Country: Russia
- Region: Amur Oblast
- District: Mazanovsky District
- Time zone: UTC+9:00

Mazanovo (Russian: Мазаново) is a rural locality (a selo) in Mazanovsky Selsoviet of Mazanovsky District, Amur Oblast, Russia. The population was 641 as of 2018. There are 14 streets.

== Geography ==
Mazanovo is located on the left bank of the Zeya River, 8 km west of Novokiyevsky Uval (the district's administrative centre) by road. Beloyarovo is the nearest rural locality.
