= Umlekan =

Umlekan Умлекан
- Selo
- Location within Amur Oblast Location within Russia
- Coordinates: 53°15′N 127°07′E
- Country: Russia
- Region: Amur Oblast
- District: Zeysky District
- Time zone: UTC+9:00

Umlekan (Russian: Умлекан) is a rural locality (a selo) and the administrative center of Umlekansky Selsoviet of Zeysky District, Amur Oblast, Russia. The population was 256 as of 2018. There are 8 streets.

== Geography ==
Umlekan is located 76 km south of Zeya (the district's administrative centre) by road. Rublevka is the nearest rural locality.
