= Verkhneblagoveshchenskoye =

Verkhneblagoveshchenskoye Верхнеблаговещенское
- Selo
- Location within Amur Oblast Location within Russia
- Coordinates: 50°17′N 127°23′E
- Country: Russia
- Region: Amur Oblast
- District: Blagoveshchensky District
- Time zone: UTC+9:00

Verkhneblagoveshchenskoye (Russian: Верхнеблаговещенское) is a rural locality (a selo) in Chigirinsky Selsoviet of Blagoveshchensky District, Amur Oblast, Russia. The population was 703 as of 2018. There are 18 streets.

== Geography ==
Verkhneblagoveshchenskoye is located on the left bank of the Amur River, 13 km west of Blagoveshchensk (the district's administrative centre) by road. Blagoveshchensk is the nearest rural locality.
