= Semidomka =

Semidomka Семидомка
- Selo
- Location within Amur Oblast Location within Russia
- Coordinates: 49°44′N 127°47′E
- Country: Russia
- Region: Amur Oblast
- District: Konstantinovsky District
- Time zone: UTC+9:00

Semidomka (Russian: Семидомка) is a rural locality (a selo) in Semidomsky Selsoviet of Konstantinovsky District, Amur Oblast, Russia. The population was 281 as of 2018. There are 10 streets.

== Geography ==
Semidomka is located 26 km northwest of Konstantinovka (the district's administrative centre) by road. Kovrizhka is the nearest rural locality.
