= Kupriyanovo =

Kupriyanovo Куприяново
- Selo
- Location within Amur Oblast Location within Russia
- Coordinates: 49°27′N 129°00′E
- Country: Russia
- Region: Amur Oblast
- District: Mikhaylovsky District
- Time zone: UTC+9:00

Kupriyanovo (Russian: Куприяново) is a rural locality (a selo) in Novochesnokovsky Selsoviet of Mikhaylovsky District, Amur Oblast, Russia. The population was 124 as of 2018. There are 6 streets.

== Geography ==
Kupriyanovo is located on the left bank of the Amur River, 41 km southeast of Poyarkovo (the district's administrative centre) by road. Novochesnokovo is the nearest rural locality.
