= Bochkaryovka =

Bochkaryovka Бочкарёвка
- Selo
- Location within Amur Oblast Location within Russia
- Coordinates: 50°57′N 128°27′E
- Country: Russia
- Region: Amur Oblast
- District: Seryshevsky District
- Time zone: UTC+9:00

Bochkaryovka (Russian: Бочкарёвка) is a rural locality (a selo) in Tomsky Selsoviet of Seryshevsky District, Amur Oblast, Russia. The population was 1,049 as of 2018. There are 8 streets.

== Geography ==
Bochkaryovka is located 19 km south of Seryshevo (the district's administrative centre) by road. Tomskoye is the nearest rural locality.
