= Sokolovka, Amur Oblast =

Sokolovka Соколовка
- Selo
- Location within Amur Oblast Location within Russia
- Coordinates: 51°00′N 129°12′E
- Country: Russia
- Region: Amur Oblast
- District: Seryshevsky District
- Time zone: UTC+9:00

Sokolovka (Russian: Соколовка) is a rural locality (a selo) in Shirokologsky Selsoviet of Seryshevsky District, Amur Oblast, Russia. The population was 51 as of 2018. There are 2 streets.

== Geography ==
Sokolovka is located 82 km east of Seryshevo (the district's administrative centre) by road. Voskresenovka is the nearest rural locality.
