= Raygorodka =

Raygorodka Райгородка
- Selo
- Location within Amur Oblast Location within Russia
- Coordinates: 50°53′N 129°19′E
- Country: Russia
- Region: Amur Oblast
- District: Romnensky District
- Time zone: UTC+9:00

Raygorodka (Russian: Райгородка) is a rural locality (a selo) in Chergalinsky Selsoviet of Romnensky District, Amur Oblast, Russia. The population was 25 as of 2018. There is 1 street.

== Geography ==
Raygorodka is located on the left bank of the Gorbyl River, 30 km north of Romny (the district's administrative centre) by road. Khokhlatskoye is the nearest rural locality.
