= Bibikovo =

Bibikovo Бибиково
- Selo
- Location within Amur Oblast Location within Russia
- Coordinates: 50°48′N 127°13′E
- Country: Russia
- Region: Amur Oblast
- District: Blagoveshchensky District
- Time zone: UTC+9:00

Bibikovo (Russian: Бибиково) is a rural locality (a selo) in Sergeyevsky Selsoviet of Blagoveshchensky District, Amur Oblast, Russia. The population was 175 as of 2018. There are 2 streets.

== Geography ==
Bibikovo is located on the left bank of the Amur River, 75 km north of Blagoveshchensk (the district's administrative centre) by road. Sergeyevka is the nearest rural locality.
