= Sulus =

Sulus Сулус
- Station
- Location within Amur Oblast Location within Russia
- Coordinates: 53°15′N 126°12′E
- Country: Russia
- Region: Amur Oblast
- District: Magdagachinsky District
- Time zone: UTC+9:00

Sulus (Russian: Сулус) is a rural locality (a station) in Daktuyskoye Rural Settlement of Magdagachinsky District, Amur Oblast, Russia. The population was 31 as of 2018. There is 1 street.

== Geography ==
The village is located 9 km from Daktuy and 40 km from Magdagachi.
