= Glukhari =

Glukhari Глухари
- Selo
- Location within Amur Oblast Location within Russia
- Coordinates: 51°44′N 128°04′E
- Country: Russia
- Region: Amur Oblast
- District: Svobodnensky District
- Time zone: UTC+9:00

Glukhari (Russian: Глухари) is a rural locality (a selo) and the administrative center of Kurgansky Selsoviet of Svobodnensky District, Amur Oblast, Russia. The population was 161 as of 2018. There are 9 streets.

== Geography ==
Glukhari is located on the right bank of the Bolshaya Pera River, 48 km north of Svobodny (the district's administrative centre) by road. Tsiolkovsky is the nearest rural locality.
