= Svetilovka =

Svetilovka Светиловка
- Selo
- Location within Amur Oblast Location within Russia
- Coordinates: 50°59′N 127°57′E
- Country: Russia
- Region: Amur Oblast
- District: Belogorsky District
- Time zone: UTC+9:00

Svetilovka (Russian: Светиловка) is a rural locality (a selo) in Svetilovsky Selsoviet of Belogorsky District, Amur Oblast, Russia. The population was 413 as of 2018. There are 5 streets.

== Geography ==
Svetilovka is located on the left bank of the Tom River, 41 km west of Belogorsk (the district's administrative centre) by road. Velikoknyazevka is the nearest rural locality.
