= Leontyevka =

Leontyevka Леонтьевка
- Selo
- Location within Amur Oblast Location within Russia
- Coordinates: 51°28′N 128°31′E
- Country: Russia
- Region: Amur Oblast
- District: Mazanovsky District
- Time zone: UTC+9:00

Leontyevka (Russian: Леонтьевка) is a rural locality (a selo) in Krasnoyarovsky Selsoviet of Mazanovsky District, Amur Oblast, Russia. The population was 70 as of 2018. There are 2 streets.

== Geography ==
Leontyevka is located on the left bank of the Birma River, 38 km southwest of Novokiyevsky Uval (the district's administrative centre) by road. Antonovka is the nearest rural locality.
