= Tymersol =

Tymersol Тымерсоль
- Railway station
- Location within Amur Oblast Location within Russia
- Coordinates: 53°22′N 126°07′E
- Country: Russia
- Region: Amur Oblast
- District: Magdagachinsky District
- Time zone: UTC+9:00

Tymersol (Russian: Тымерсоль) is a rural locality (a railway station) in Daktuyskoye Rural Settlement of Magdagachinsky District, Amur Oblast, Russia. The population was 5 as of 2018.

== Geography ==
The village is located 22 km from Magdagachi and 7 km from Daktuy.

== Ethnicity ==
The village is inhabited by Russians.
