= Verkhneilyinovka =

Verkhneilyinovka Верхнеильиновка
- Selo
- Location within Amur Oblast Location within Russia
- Coordinates: 50°12′N 129°41′E
- Country: Russia
- Region: Amur Oblast
- District: Zavitinsky District
- Time zone: UTC+9:00

Verkhneilyinovka (Russian: Верхнеильиновка) is a rural locality (a selo) and the administrative center of Verkhneilyinsky Selsoviet of Zavitinsky District, Amur Oblast, Russia. The population was 161 as of 2018. There are 8 streets.

== Geography ==
Verkhneilyinovka is located 37 km northeast of Zavitinsk (the district's administrative centre) by road. Boldyrevka is the nearest rural locality.
