= Kovrizhka =

Kovrizhka Коврижка
- Selo
- Location within Amur Oblast Location within Russia
- Coordinates: 49°42′N 127°50′E
- Country: Russia
- Region: Amur Oblast
- District: Konstantinovsky District
- Time zone: UTC+9:00

Kovrizhka (Russian: Коврижка) is a rural locality (a selo) and the administrative center of Kovrizhsky Selsoviet of Konstantinovsky District, Amur Oblast, Russia. The population was 378 as of 2018. There are 7 streets.

== Geography ==
Kovrizhka is located 20 km northwest of Konstantinovka (the district's administrative centre) by road. Oktyabrskoye is the nearest rural locality.
