= Novovoskresenovka =

Novovoskresenovka Нововоскресеновка
- Selo
- Location within Amur Oblast Location within Russia
- Coordinates: 52°06′N 126°34′E
- Country: Russia
- Region: Amur Oblast
- District: Shimanovsky District
- Time zone: UTC+9:00

Novovoskresenovka (Russian: Нововоскресеновка) is a rural locality (a selo) and the administrative center of Novovoskresenovsky Selsoviet of Shimanovsky District, Amur Oblast, Russia. The population was 506 as of 2018. There are 13 streets.

== Geography ==
Novovoskresenovka is located 135 km west of Shimanovsk (the district's administrative centre) by road. Anosovo is the nearest rural locality.
