= Yaroslavka =

Yaroslavka Ярославка
- Selo
- Location within Amur Oblast Location within Russia
- Coordinates: 49°54′N 128°30′E
- Country: Russia
- Region: Amur Oblast
- District: Mikhaylovsky District
- Time zone: UTC+9:00

Yaroslavka (Russian: Ярославка) is a rural locality (a selo) in Nizhneilyinovsky Selsoviet of Mikhaylovsky District, Amur Oblast, Russia. The population was 68 as of 2018. There are 2 streets.

== Geography ==
Yaroslavka is located on the right bank of the Dim River, 48 km north of Poyarkovo (the district's administrative centre) by road. Nizhnyaya Ilyinovka is the nearest rural locality.
