= Komissarovka =

Komissarovka Комиссаровка
- Selo
- Location within Amur Oblast Location within Russia
- Coordinates: 50°51′N 127°59′E
- Country: Russia
- Region: Amur Oblast
- District: Belogorsky District
- Time zone: UTC+9:00

Komissarovka (Russian: Комиссаровка) is a rural locality (a selo) in Velikoknyazevsky Selsoviet of Belogorsky District, Amur Oblast, Russia. The population was 94 as of 2018. There are 3 streets.

== Geography ==
Komissarovka is located 58 km west of Belogorsk (the district's administrative centre) by road. Velikoknyazevka is the nearest rural locality.
