= Peschanoozerka =

Peschanoozerka Песчаноозёрка
- Selo
- Location within Amur Oblast Location within Russia
- Coordinates: 50°19′N 128°40′E
- Country: Russia
- Region: Amur Oblast
- District: Oktyabrsky District
- Time zone: UTC+9:00

Peschanoozerka (Russian: Песчаноозёрка) is a rural locality (a selo) in Peschanoozersky Selsoviet of Oktyabrsky District, Amur Oblast, Russia. The population was 462 as of 2018. There are 4 streets.

== Geography ==
Peschanoozerka is located 43 km west of Yekaterinoslavka (the district's administrative centre) by road. Varvarovka is the nearest rural locality.
