= Voskresenovka (selo), Mikhaylovsky District, Amur Oblast =

Voskresenovka Воскресеновка
- Selo
- Location within Amur Oblast Location within Russia
- Coordinates: 49°49′N 128°58′E
- Country: Russia
- Region: Amur Oblast
- District: Mikhaylovsky District
- Time zone: UTC+9:00

Voskresenovka (Russian: Воскресеновка) is a rural locality (a selo) and the administrative center of Voskresenovsky Selsoviet of Mikhaylovsky District, Amur Oblast, Russia. The population was 230 as of 2018. There are 4 streets.

== Geography ==
Voskresenovka is located 43 km northeast of Poyarkovo (the district's administrative centre) by road. Bezozyornoye is the nearest rural locality.
