= Avtonomovka =

Avtonomovka Автономовка
- Selo
- Location within Amur Oblast Location within Russia
- Coordinates: 51°10′N 129°00′E
- Country: Russia
- Region: Amur Oblast
- District: Seryshevsky District
- Time zone: UTC+9:00

Avtonomovka (Russian: Автономовка) is a rural locality (a selo) in Sosnovsky Selsoviet of Seryshevsky District, Amur Oblast, Russia. The population was 129 as of 2018. There are 3 streets.

== Geography ==
Avtonomovka is located 53 km east of Seryshevo (the district's administrative centre) by road. Verkhneborovaya is the nearest rural locality.
