= Novopokrovka, Ivanovsky District, Amur Oblast =

Novopokrovka Новопокровка
- Selo
- Location within Amur Oblast Location within Russia
- Coordinates: 50°36′N 128°12′E
- Country: Russia
- Region: Amur Oblast
- District: Ivanovsky District
- Time zone: UTC+9:00

Novopokrovka (Russian: Новопокровка) is a rural locality (a selo) in Nikolayevsky Selsoviet of Ivanovsky District, Amur Oblast, Russia. The population was 160 as of 2018. There are 3 streets.

== Geography ==
Novopokrovka is located on the left bank of the Belaya River, 55 km northeast of Ivanovka (the district's administrative centre) by road. Nikolayevka is the nearest rural locality.
