= Shurino =

Shurino Шурино
- Selo
- Location within Amur Oblast Location within Russia
- Coordinates: 49°46′N 128°50′E
- Country: Russia
- Region: Amur Oblast
- District: Mikhaylovsky District
- Time zone: UTC+9:00

Shurino (Russian: Шурино) is a rural locality (a selo) in Dubovsky Selsoviet of Mikhaylovsky District, Amur Oblast, Russia. The population was 53 as of 2018. There are 6 streets.

== Geography ==
Shurino is located 27 km northeast of Poyarkovo (the district's administrative centre) by road. Voskresenovka is the nearest rural locality.
