= Ayachi, Amur Oblast =

Ayachi Аячи
- Passing loop
- Location within Amur Oblast Location within Russia
- Coordinates: 54°00′N 122°05′E
- Country: Russia
- Region: Amur Oblast
- District: Skovorodinsky District
- Time zone: UTC+9:00

Ayachi (Russian: Аячи) is a rural locality (a passing loop) in Rabochy Posyolok Erofey Pavlovich of Skovorodinsky District, Amur Oblast, Russia. The population was 32 as of 2018. The Locality has 1 street.

== Geography ==
It is located 29 km from Yerofey Pavlovich.
