= Shiroky Log =

Shiroky Log Широкий Лог
- Selo
- Location within Amur Oblast Location within Russia
- Coordinates: 50°55′N 129°04′E
- Country: Russia
- Region: Amur Oblast
- District: Seryshevsky District
- Time zone: UTC+9:00

Shiroky Log (Russian: Широкий Лог) is a rural locality (a selo) and the administrative center of Shirokologsky Selsoviet of Seryshevsky District, Amur Oblast, Russia. The population was 288 as of 2018. There are 9 streets.

== Geography ==
Shiroky Log is located 69 km southeast of Seryshevo (the district's administrative centre) by road. Novy Byt is the nearest rural locality.
