= Yegoryevka =

Yegoryevka Егорьевка
- Selo
- Location within Amur Oblast Location within Russia
- Coordinates: 50°40′N 127°41′E
- Country: Russia
- Region: Amur Oblast
- District: Blagoveshchensky District
- Time zone: UTC+9:00

Yegoryevka (Russian: Егорьевка) is a rural locality (a selo) in Novopetrovsky Selsoviet of Blagoveshchensky District, Amur Oblast, Russia. The population was 183 as of 2018. There are 4 streets.

== Geography ==
Yegoryevka is located in the valley of the right bank of the Zeya River, 55 km north of Blagoveshchensk (the district's administrative centre) by road. Novinka is the nearest rural locality.
