= Ukraina, Amur Oblast =

Ukraina Украина
- Station
- Location within Amur Oblast Location within Russia
- Coordinates: 50°59′N 128°25′E
- Country: Russia
- Region: Amur Oblast
- District: Seryshevsky District
- Time zone: UTC+9:00

Ukraina (Russian: Украина) is a rural locality (a station) in Tomsky Selsoviet of Seryshevsky District, Amur Oblast, Russia. The population was 74 as of 2018. There are 2 streets.

== Geography ==
Ukraina is located 19 km south of Seryshevo (the district's administrative centre) by road. Krasnaya Polyana is the nearest rural locality.
