= Cheremisino =

Cheremisino Черемисино
- Selo
- Location within Amur Oblast Location within Russia
- Coordinates: 49°44′N 128°38′E
- Country: Russia
- Region: Amur Oblast
- District: Mikhaylovsky District
- Time zone: UTC+9:00

Cheremisino (Russian: Черемисино) is a rural locality (a selo) in Zelenoborsky Selsoviet of Mikhaylovsky District, Amur Oblast, Russia. The population was 50 as of 2018. There are 2 streets.

== Geography ==
Cheremisino is located on the left bank of the Zavitaya River, 14 km north of Poyarkovo (the district's administrative centre) by road. Krasny Vostok is the nearest rural locality.
