= Itashino =

Itashino Иташино
- Passing loop
- Location within Amur Oblast Location within Russia
- Coordinates: 53°59′N 122°02′E
- Country: Russia
- Region: Amur Oblast
- District: Skovorodinsky District
- Time zone: UTC+9:00

Itashino (Russian: Иташино) is a rural locality (a passing loop) in Rabochy Posyolok Erofey Pavlovich of Skovorodinsky District, Amur Oblast, Russia. The population was 6 as of 2018.

== Geography ==
Itashino is located 149 km west of Skovorodino (the district's administrative centre) by road. Yagodny is the nearest rural locality.
