= Novoivanovka, Amur Oblast =

Novoivanovka Новоивановка
- Selo
- Location within Amur Oblast Location within Russia
- Coordinates: 51°24′N 127°59′E
- Country: Russia
- Region: Amur Oblast
- District: Svobodnensky District
- Time zone: UTC+9:00 (CET)

Novoivanovka (Russian: Новоивановка) is a rural locality (a selo) and the administrative center of Novoivanovsky Selsoviet of Svobodnensky District, Amur Oblast, Russia. The population is 516 as of 2018.

== Geography ==
The village is located 12 km west from Svobodny.
