= Yukhta =

Yukhta Юхта
- Settlement
- Location within Amur Oblast Location within Russia
- Coordinates: 51°31′N 128°07′E
- Country: Russia
- Region: Amur Oblast
- District: Svobodnensky District
- Time zone: UTC+9:00

Yukhta (Russian: Юхта) is a rural locality (a settlement) in Dmitriyevsky Selsoviet of Svobodnensky District, Amur Oblast, Russia. The population was 457 as of 2018. There are 9 streets.

== Geography ==
Yukhta is located on the right bank of the Bolshaya Pyora River, 19 km north of Svobodny (the district's administrative centre) by road. Dmitriyevka is the nearest rural locality.
