= Mukhinka =

Mukhinka Мухинка
- Settlement
- Location within Amur Oblast Location within Russia
- Coordinates: 50°32′N 127°38′E
- Country: Russia
- Region: Amur Oblast
- District: Urban okrug Blagoveshchensk
- Time zone: UTC+9:00

Mukhinka (Russian: Му́хинка) is a rural locality (a settlement) in urban okrug Blagoveshchensk of Amur Oblast, Russia. The population was 126 as of 2018. There is 1 street.

== Geography ==
Mukhinka is located near the right bank of the Zeya River, 38 km north of Blagoveshchensk (the district's administrative centre) by road. Prizeyskaya is the nearest rural locality.
