= Taldan =

Taldan Талдан
- Selo
- Location within Amur Oblast Location within Russia
- Coordinates: 53°41′N 124°48′E
- Country: Russia
- Region: Amur Oblast
- District: Skovorodinsky District
- Time zone: UTC+9:00

Taldan (Russian: Талдан) is a rural locality (a selo) and the administrative center of Taldansky Selsoviet of Skovorodinsky District, Amur Oblast, Russia. The population was 2,850 as of 2018. There are 24 streets.

== Geography ==
Taldan is located 85 km southeast of Skovorodino (the district's administrative centre) by road. Gudachi is the nearest rural locality.
