= Zhuravli, Russia =

Zhuravli Журавли
- Station
- Location within Amur Oblast Location within Russia
- Coordinates: 49°30′N 129°59′E
- Country: Russia
- Region: Amur Oblast
- District: Arkharinsky District
- Time zone: UTC+9:00

Zhuravlyi (Russian: Журавли) is a rural locality (a station) in Kasatkinsky Selsoviet of Arkharinsky District, Amur Oblast, Russia. The population was 2 in 2018.

== Geography ==
Zhuravli is located on Trans-Siberian Railway, 16 km northwest of Arkhara (the district's administrative centre) by road. Krasnaya Gorka is the nearest rural locality.
