= Urozhaynoye =

Urozhaynoye Урожайное
- Selo
- Location within Amur Oblast Location within Russia
- Coordinates: 50°25′N 128°53′E
- Country: Russia
- Region: Amur Oblast
- District: Romnensky District
- Time zone: UTC+9:00

Urozhaynoye (Russian: Урожайное) is a rural locality (a selo) in Dalnevostochny Selsoviet of Romnensky District, Amur Oblast, Russia. The population was 4 as of 2018. There are 2 streets.

== Geography ==
Urozhaynoye is located 56 km southwest of Romny (the district's administrative centre) by road. Pereyaslovka is the nearest rural locality.
