= Lugovoye, Belogorsky District, Amur Oblast =

Lugovoye Луговое
- Selo
- Location within Amur Oblast Location within Russia
- Coordinates: 50°45′N 129°03′E
- Country: Russia
- Region: Amur Oblast
- District: Belogorsky District
- Time zone: UTC+9:00

Lugovoye (Russian: Луговое) was a rural locality (a selo) in Novinsky Selsoviet of Belogorsky District, Amur Oblast, Russia. The population is 41 as of 2018. There are 3 streets.

== Geography ==
Lugovoye is located 55 km southeast of Belogorsk (the district's administrative centre) by road. Mostovoye is the nearest rural locality.
