= Muravka =

Muravka Муравка
- Selo
- Location within Amur Oblast Location within Russia
- Coordinates: 49°47′N 129°36′E
- Country: Russia
- Region: Amur Oblast
- District: Bureysky District
- Time zone: UTC+9:00

Muravka (Russian: Муравка) is a rural locality (a selo) in Rabochy posyolok Bureya of Bureysky District, Amur Oblast, Russia. The population was 75 as of 2018. There are 6 streets.

== Geography ==
Muravka is located 29 km west of Novobureysky (the district's administrative centre) by road. Novoraychikhinsk is the nearest rural locality.
