= Ugolnoye, Amur Oblast =

Ugolnoye Угольное
- Selo
- Location within Amur Oblast Location within Russia
- Coordinates: 49°48′N 129°25′E
- Country: Russia
- Region: Amur Oblast
- District: Urban okrug Raychikhinsk city
- Time zone: UTC+9:00

Ugolnoye (Russian: Угольное) is a rural locality (a selo) in Raychikhinsk city urban okrug, Amur Oblast, Russia. The population was 41 as of 2018. There are 3 streets.

== Geography ==
The village is a satellite town of Raychikhinsk.
