= Smolyanoye =

Smolyanoye Смоляное
- Selo
- Location within Amur Oblast Location within Russia
- Coordinates: 50°51′N 129°28′E
- Country: Russia
- Region: Amur Oblast
- District: Romnensky District
- Time zone: UTC+9:00

Smolyanoye (Russian: Смоляное) is a rural locality (a selo) in Chergalinsky Selsoviet of Romnensky District, Amur Oblast, Russia. The population was 124 as of 2018. There are 4 streets.

== Geography ==
Smolyanoye is located on the right bank of the Gorbyl River, 27 km northeast of Romny (the district's administrative centre) by road. Pridorozhnoye is the nearest rural locality.
