= Gashchenka =

Gashchenka Гащенка
- Selo
- Location within Amur Oblast Location within Russia
- Coordinates: 51°30′N 128°22′E
- Country: Russia
- Region: Amur Oblast
- District: Svobodnensky District
- Time zone: UTC+9:00

Gashchenka (Russian: Гащенка) is a rural locality (a selo) in Zheltoyarovsky Selsoviet of Svobodnensky District, Amur Oblast, Russia. The population was 159 as of 2018. There are 6 streets.

== Geography ==
Gashchenka is located on the right bank of the Gashchenka River, 33 km northeast of Svobodny (the district's administrative centre) by road. Zheltoyarovo is the nearest rural locality.
