= Bratolyubovka =

Bratolyubovka Братолюбовка
- Selo
- Location within Amur Oblast Location within Russia
- Coordinates: 50°47′N 129°25′E
- Country: Russia
- Region: Amur Oblast
- District: Romnensky District
- Time zone: UTC+9:00

Bratolyubovka (Russian: Братолюбовка) is a rural locality (a selo) in Chergalinsky Selsoviet of Romnensky District, Amur Oblast, Russia. The population was 102 as of 2018. There are 2 streets.

== Geography ==
Bratolyubovka is located 14 km northeast of Romny (the district's administrative centre) by road. Romny is the nearest rural locality.
