= Sadovoye, Amur Oblast =

Sadovoye Садовое
- Selo
- Location within Amur Oblast Location within Russia
- Coordinates: 50°20′N 127°34′E
- Country: Russia
- Region: Amur Oblast
- District: Urban okrug Blagoveshchensk
- Time zone: UTC+9:00

Sadovoye (Russian: Садо́вое) is a rural locality (a selo) in urban okrug Blagoveshchensk of Amur Oblast, Russia. The population was 1,087 as of 2018.

== Geography ==
Sadovoye is located 12 km north of Blagoveshchensk (the district's administrative centre) by road. Splavnaya kontora is the nearest rural locality.
