= Polyanoye =

Polyanoye Поляное
- Selo
- Location within Amur Oblast Location within Russia
- Coordinates: 50°44′N 128°19′E
- Country: Russia
- Region: Amur Oblast
- District: Belogorsky District
- Time zone: UTC+9:00

Polyanoye (Russian: Поляное) is a rural locality (a selo) in Tomichevsky Selsoviet of Belogorsky District, Amur Oblast, Russia. The population was 113 as of 2018. There are 8 streets.

== Geography ==
Polyanoye is located 31 km southwest of Belogorsk (the district's administrative centre) by road. Lokhvitsy is the nearest rural locality.
