= Kuzmichi =

Kuzmichi Кузьмичи
- Selo
- Location within Amur Oblast Location within Russia
- Coordinates: 50°36′N 129°03′E
- Country: Russia
- Region: Amur Oblast
- District: Romnensky District
- Time zone: UTC+9:00

Kuzmichi (Russian: Кузьмичи) is a rural locality (a selo) in Znamensky Selsoviet of Romnensky District, Amur Oblast, Russia. The population was 21 as of 2018. There is 1 street.

== Geography ==
Kuzmichi is located on the left bank of the Belaya River, 25 km southwest of Romny (the district's administrative centre) by road. Znamenka is the nearest rural locality.
