= Podolovka =

Podolovka Подоловка
- Selo
- Location within Amur Oblast Location within Russia
- Coordinates: 49°53′N 129°11′E
- Country: Russia
- Region: Amur Oblast
- District: Zavitinsky District
- Time zone: UTC+9:00

Podolovka (Russian: Подоловка) is a rural locality (a selo) in Kupriyanovsky Selsoviet of Zavitinsky District, Amur Oblast, Russia. The population was 172 as of 2018. There are 2 streets.

== Geography ==
Podolovka is located 34 km southwest of Zavitinsk (the district's administrative centre) by road. Fyodorovka is the nearest rural locality.
