= Anosovsky =

Anosovsky Аносовский
- Settlement
- Location within Amur Oblast Location within Russia
- Coordinates: 54°37′N 123°58′E
- Country: Russia
- Region: Amur Oblast
- District: Tyndinsky District
- Time zone: UTC+9:00

Anosovsky (Russian: Аносовский) is a rural locality (a settlement) in Anosovsky Selsoviet of Tyndinsky District, Amur Oblast, Russia. The population was 200 as of 2018. There are 2 streets.

== Geography ==
Anosovsky is located 92 km southwest of Tynda (the district's administrative centre) by road. Purikan is the nearest rural locality.
