= Valuyevo =

Valuyevo Валуево
- Selo
- Location within Amur Oblast Location within Russia
- Coordinates: 50°03′N 129°33′E
- Country: Russia
- Region: Amur Oblast
- District: Zavitinsky District
- Time zone: UTC+9:00

Valuyevo (Russian: Валуево) is a rural locality (a selo) in Preobrazhensky Selsoviet of Zavitinsky District, Amur Oblast, Russia. The population was 112 as of 2018. There are 2 streets.

== Geography ==
Valuyevo is located near the Trans-Siberian Railway, 18 km southeast of Zavitinsk (the district's administrative centre) by road. Deya is the nearest rural locality.
