= Kostyukovka =

Kostyukovka Костюковка
- Selo
- Location within Amur Oblast Location within Russia
- Coordinates: 51°18′N 127°40′E
- Country: Russia
- Region: Amur Oblast
- District: Svobodnensky District
- Time zone: UTC+9:00

Kostyukovka (Russian: Костюковка) is a rural locality (a selo) and the administrative center of Kostyukovsky Selsoviet of Svobodnensky District, Amur Oblast, Russia. The population was 461 as of 2018. There are 7 streets.

== Geography ==
Kostyukovka is located on the bank of the Golubaya River, 43 km west of Svobodny (the district's administrative centre) by road. Zigovka is the nearest rural locality.
