= Varvarovka =

Varvarovka Варваровка
- Selo
- Location within Amur Oblast Location within Russia
- Coordinates: 50°20′N 128°34′E
- Country: Russia
- Region: Amur Oblast
- District: Oktyabrsky District
- Time zone: UTC+9:00

Varvarovka (Russian: Варваровка) is a rural locality (a selo) in Varvarovsky Selsoviet of Oktyabrsky District, Amur Oblast, Russia. The population was 2529 as of 2018. There are 11 streets.

== Geography ==
The village is located on the left bank of the Ivanovka River, 51 km west of Yekaterinoslavka (the district's administrative centre) by road. Peschanoozyorka is the nearest rural locality. Services located in Varvarovka include Administratsiya Munitsipal'nogo Obrazovaniya Varvarovskiy Sel'sovet Oktyabr'skogo Rayona Amurskoy Oblasti and Sberbank Rossii.
