= Vostochnaya Niva =

Vostochnaya Niva Восточная Нива
- Selo
- Location within Amur Oblast Location within Russia
- Coordinates: 50°37′N 129°34′E
- Country: Russia
- Region: Amur Oblast
- District: Romnensky District
- Time zone: UTC+9:00

Vostochnaya Niva (Russian: Восточная Нива) is a rural locality (a selo) in Amaransky Selsoviet of Romnensky District, Amur Oblast, Russia. The population was 6 as of 2018. There are 2 streets.

== Geography ==
Vostochnaya Niva is located on the left bank of the Amaranka River, 39 km southeast of Romny (the district's administrative centre) by road. Amaranka is the nearest rural locality.
