= Koltsovka =

Koltsovka Кольцовка
- Selo
- Location within Amur Oblast Location within Russia
- Coordinates: 51°21′N 128°58′E
- Country: Russia
- Region: Amur Oblast
- District: Mazanovsky District
- Time zone: UTC+9:00

Koltsovka (Russian: Кольцовка) is a rural locality (a selo) in Sapronovsky Selsoviet of Mazanovsky District, Amur Oblast, Russia. The population was 38 as of 2018. There is 1 street.

== Geography ==
Koltsovka is located on the right bank of the Birma River, 44 km south of Novokiyevsky Uval (the district's administrative centre) by road. Kanichi is the nearest rural locality.
