= Pereselenets =

Pereselenets Переселенец
- Station
- Location within Amur Oblast Location within Russia
- Coordinates: 52°22′N 127°05′E
- Country: Russia
- Region: Amur Oblast
- District: Shimanovsky District
- Time zone: UTC+9:00

Pereselenets (Russian: Переселенец) is a rural locality (a station) in Mukhinsky Selsoviet of Shimanovsky District, Amur Oblast, Russia, 63 km northwest of Shimanovsk. The population was 1 in 2018.
