= Bogorodskoye, Amur Oblast =

Bogorodskoye Богородское
- Selo
- Location within Amur Oblast Location within Russia
- Coordinates: 50°26′N 127°48′E
- Country: Russia
- Region: Amur Oblast
- District: Ivanovsky District
- Time zone: UTC+9:00

Bogorodskoye (Russian: Богородское) is a rural locality (a selo) in Cheremkhovsky Selsoviet of Ivanovsky District, Amur Oblast, Russia. The population was 549 as of 2018. There are 4 streets.

== Geography ==
Bogorodskoye is located 21 km northwest of Ivanovka (the district's administrative centre) by road. Cheremkhovo is the nearest rural locality.
