= Chesnokovo =

Chesnokovo Чесноково
- Selo
- Location within Amur Oblast Location within Russia
- Coordinates: 49°33′N 128°48′E
- Country: Russia
- Region: Amur Oblast
- District: Mikhaylovsky District
- Time zone: UTC+9:00

Chesnokovo (Russian: Чесноково) is a rural locality (a selo) and the administrative center of Chesnokovsky Selsoviet of Mikhaylovsky District, Amur Oblast, Russia. The population was 710 as of 2018. There are 18 streets.

== Geography ==
Chesnokovo is located on the left bank of the Amur River, 19 km southeast of Poyarkovo (the district's administrative centre) by road. Shadrino is the nearest rural locality.
