= Kuropatino =

Kuropatino Куропатино
- Selo
- Location within Amur Oblast Location within Russia
- Coordinates: 49°59′N 127°39′E
- Country: Russia
- Region: Amur Oblast
- District: Tambovsky District
- Time zone: UTC+9:00

Kuropatino (Russian: Куропатино) is a rural locality (a selo) and the administrative center of Kuropatinsky Selsoviet of Tambovsky District, Amur Oblast, Russia. The population was 482 as of 2018. There are only 5 streets in the village.

== Geography ==
Kuropatino is located 35 km southwest of Tambovka (the district's administrative centre) by road. Nikolayevka is the nearest rural locality.
