= Milekhino =

Milekhino Милехино
- Selo
- Location within Amur Oblast Location within Russia
- Coordinates: 51°01′N 128°57′E
- Country: Russia
- Region: Amur Oblast
- District: Seryshevsky District
- Time zone: UTC+9:00

Milekhino (Russian: Милехино) is a rural locality (a selo) in Vodorazdelnensky Selsoviet of Seryshevsky District, Amur Oblast, Russia. The population was 55 as of 2018.

== Geography ==
It is located 57 km from Seryshevo, 8 km from Vodorazdelnoye.
