= Chalbachi =

Chalbachi Чалбачи
- Selo
- Location within Amur Oblast Location within Russia
- Coordinates: 53°20′N 127°02′E
- Country: Russia
- Region: Amur Oblast
- District: Zeysky District
- Time zone: UTC+9:00

Chalbachi (Russian: Чалбачи) is a rural locality (a selo) in Chalbachinsky Selsoviet of Zeysky District, Amur Oblast, Russia. The population was 273 as of 2018. There are 8 streets.

== Geography ==
Chalbachi is located on the left bank of the Zeya River, 65 km south of Zeya (the district's administrative centre) by road. Algach is the nearest rural locality.
