= Uvalny =

Uvalny Увальный
- Settlement
- Location within Amur Oblast Location within Russia
- Coordinates: 50°05′N 128°50′E
- Country: Russia
- Region: Amur Oblast
- District: Oktyabrsky District
- Time zone: UTC+9:00

Uvalny (Russian: Увальный) is a rural locality (a settlement) in Trudovoy Selsoviet of Oktyabrsky District, Amur Oblast, Russia. The population was 70 as of 2018. There are 6 streets.

== Geography ==
Uvalny is located 49 km southwest of Yekaterinoslavka (the district's administrative centre) by road. Trudovoy is the nearest rural locality.
