= Srednereynovsky =

Srednereynovsky Среднерейновский
- Settlement
- Location within Amur Oblast Location within Russia
- Coordinates: 53°41′N 123°50′E
- Country: Russia
- Region: Amur Oblast
- District: Skovorodinsky District
- Time zone: UTC+9:00

Srednereynovsky (Russian: Среднерейновский) is a rural locality (a settlement) in Dzhalindinsky Selsoviet of Skovorodinsky District, Amur Oblast, Russia. The population was 54 in 2018. There are six streets.

== Geography ==
Srednereynovsky is located 44 km south of Skovorodino (the district's administrative centre) by road. Tayozhny is the nearest rural locality.
