= Uralovka =

Uralovka Ураловка
- Selo
- Location within Amur Oblast Location within Russia
- Coordinates: 52°26′N 128°07′E
- Country: Russia
- Region: Amur Oblast
- District: Shimanovsky District
- Time zone: UTC+9:00

Uralovka (Russian: Ураловка) is a rural locality (a selo) and the administrative center of Uralovsky Selsoviet of Shimanovsky District, Amur Oblast, Russia. The population was 199 as of 2018. There are 13 streets.

== Geography ==
Uralovka is located on the Zeya River, 587 km northeast of Shimanovsk (the district's administrative centre) by road. Oktyabrsky is the nearest rural locality.
