= Kavkaz, Amur Oblast =

Kavkaz Кавказ
- Selo
- Location within Amur Oblast Location within Russia
- Coordinates: 49°44′N 128°57′E
- Country: Russia
- Region: Amur Oblast
- District: Mikhaylovsky District
- Time zone: UTC+9:00

Kavkaz (Russian: Кавказ) is a rural locality (a selo) in Voskresenovsky Selsoviet of Mikhaylovsky District, Amur Oblast, Russia. The population was 64 as of 2018. There are 2 streets.

== Geography ==
Kavkaz is located on the right bank of the Kupriyanikha River, 36 km northeast of Poyarkovo (the district's administrative centre) by road. Voskresenovka is the nearest rural locality.
