= Popovka, Amur Oblast =

Popovka Поповка
- Selo
- Location within Amur Oblast Location within Russia
- Coordinates: 51°22′N 128°21′E
- Country: Russia
- Region: Amur Oblast
- District: Mazanovsky District
- Time zone: UTC+9:00

Popovka (Russian: Поповка) is a rural locality (a selo) in Molchanovsky Selsoviet of Mazanovsky District, Amur Oblast, Russia. The population was 419 as of 2018. There are three streets.

== Geography ==
Popovka is located on the left bank of the Zeya River, 55 km southwest of Novokiyevsky Uval (the district's administrative centre) by road. Molchanovo is the nearest rural locality.
