= Mukhino, Amur Oblast =

Mukhino Мухино
- Selo
- Location within Amur Oblast Location within Russia
- Coordinates: 52°16′N 127°12′E
- Country: Russia
- Region: Amur Oblast
- District: Shimanovsky District
- Time zone: UTC+9:00

Mukhino (Russian: Мухино) is a rural locality (a selo) and the administrative center of Mukhinsky Selsoviet of Shimanovsky District, Amur Oblast, Russia. The population was 850 as of 2018. There are 18 streets.

== Geography ==
Mukhino is located 62 km northwest of Shimanovsk (the district's administrative centre) by road. Mukhinskaya is the nearest rural locality.
