= Avramovka =

Avramovka Аврамовка
- Selo
- Location within Amur Oblast Location within Russia
- Coordinates: 50°15′N 129°25′E
- Country: Russia
- Region: Amur Oblast
- District: Zavitinsky District
- Time zone: UTC+9:00

Avramovka (Russian: Аврамовка) is a rural locality (a selo) in Boldyrevsky Selsoviet of Zavitinsky District, Amur Oblast, Russia. The population was 34 as of 2018. There are 4 streets.

== Geography ==
Avramovka is located on the left bank of the Zavitaya River, 27 km north of Zavitinsk (the district's administrative centre) by road. Boldyrevka is the nearest rural locality.
