= Chervonaya Armiya =

Chervonaya Armiya Червоная Армия
- Selo
- Location within Amur Oblast Location within Russia
- Coordinates: 50°08′N 129°29′E
- Country: Russia
- Region: Amur Oblast
- District: Zavitinsky District
- Time zone: UTC+9:00

Chervonaya Armiya (Russian: Червоная Армия) is a rural locality (a selo) in Gorod Zavitinsk Urban Settlement of Zavitinsky District, Amur Oblast, Russia. The population was 190 as of 2018. There is 1 street.

== Geography ==
Chervonaya Armiya is located 9 km northeast of Zavitinsk (the district's administrative centre) by road. Zavitinsk is the nearest rural locality.
