= Prizeyskaya =

Prizeyskaya Призейская
- Station
- Location within Amur Oblast Location within Russia
- Coordinates: 50°30′N 127°39′E
- Country: Russia
- Region: Amur Oblast
- District: Urban okrug Blagoveshchensk
- Time zone: UTC+9:00

Prizeyskaya (Russian: Призе́йская) is a rural locality (a station) in urban okrug Blagoveshchensk of Amur Oblast, Russia. The population was 209 as of 2018.

== Geography ==
The village is located near the right bank of the Zeya River, 26 km north from Blagoveshchensk.
