= Pryadchino =

Pryadchino Прядчино
- Selo
- Location within Amur Oblast Location within Russia
- Coordinates: 50°15′N 127°47′E
- Country: Russia
- Region: Amur Oblast
- District: Blagoveshchensky District
- Time zone: UTC+9:00

Pryadchino (Russian: Прядчино) is a rural locality (a selo) in Novopetrovsky Selsoviet of Blagoveshchensky District, Amur Oblast, Russia. The population was 181 as of 2018. There are 8 streets.

== Geography ==
Pryadchino is located 80 km north of Blagoveshchensk (the district's administrative centre) by road. Novopetrovka is the nearest rural locality.
