= Novoostropol =

Novoostropol Новоострополь
- Selo
- Location within Amur Oblast Location within Russia
- Coordinates: 51°40′N 128°17′E
- Country: Russia
- Region: Amur Oblast
- District: Svobodnensky District
- Time zone: UTC+9:00 (CET)

Novoostropol (Russian: Новоострополь) is a rural locality (a selo) in Nizhnebuzulinsky Selsoviet of Svobodnensky District, Amur Oblast, Russia. The population is 60 as of 2018.

== Geography ==
The village is located on the Buzulka River, 38 km north from Svobodny.
