= Tolstovka, Amur Oblast =

Tolstovka Толстовка
- Selo
- Location within Amur Oblast Location within Russia
- Coordinates: 50°12′N 127°56′E
- Country: Russia
- Region: Amur Oblast
- District: Tambovsky District
- Time zone: UTC+9:00

Tolstovka (Russian: Толстовка) is a rural locality (a selo) in Tolstovsky Selsoviet of Tambovsky District, Amur Oblast, Russia. The population was 762 as of 2018. There are 8 streets.

== Geography ==
Tolstovka is located on the Bolshoy Alim River, 18 km north of Tambovka (the district's administrative centre) by road. Sadovoye is the nearest rural locality.
