= Bardagon =

Bardagon Бардагон
- Selo
- Location within Amur Oblast Location within Russia
- Coordinates: 51°17′N 128°08′E
- Country: Russia
- Region: Amur Oblast
- District: Svobodnensky District
- Time zone: UTC+9:00

Bardagon (Russian: Бардагон) is a rural locality (a selo) in Novgorodsky Selsoviet of Svobodnensky District, Amur Oblast, Russia. The population was 161 as of 2018. There are 3 streets.

== Geography ==
The village is satellite of Svobodny. The village is located on the right bank of the Zeya River, 16 km south of Svobodny (the district's administrative centre) by road. Pionerskaya is the nearest rural locality.
