= Korfovo =

Korfovo Корфово
- Selo
- Location within Amur Oblast Location within Russia
- Coordinates: 49°53′N 127°32′E
- Country: Russia
- Region: Amur Oblast
- District: Tambovsky District
- Time zone: UTC+9:00

Korfovo (Russian: Корфово) is a rural locality (a selo) in Krasnensky Selsoviet of Tambovsky District, Amur Oblast, Russia. The population was 72 as of 2018. There are 3 streets.

== Geography ==
Korfovo is located on the Amur River, 59 km southwest of Tambovka (the district's administrative centre) by road. Krasnoye is the nearest rural locality.
