= Ust-Ivanovka =

Ust-Ivanovka Усть-Ивановка
- Selo
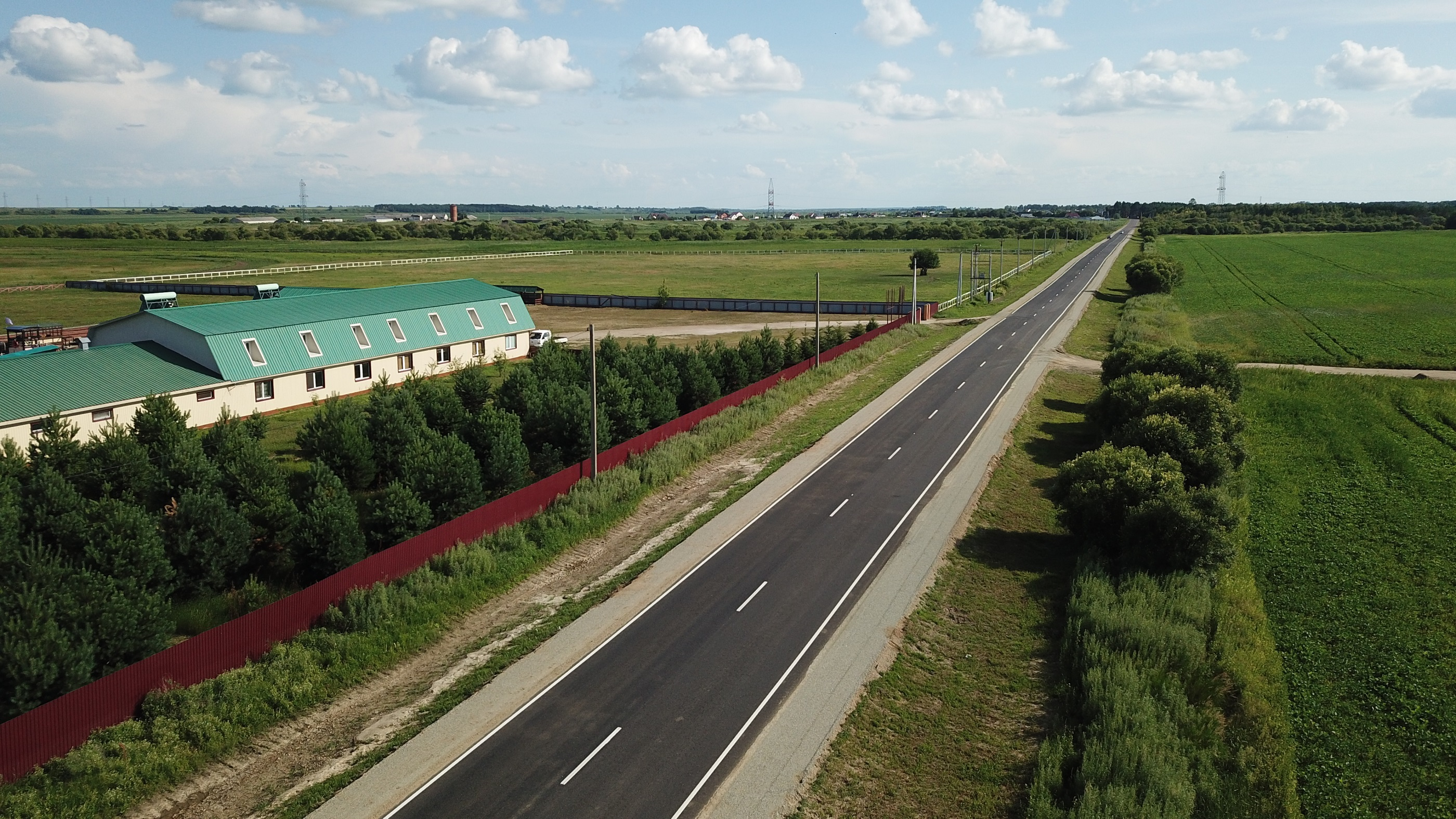
- The village is in the background

- Location within Amur Oblast Location within Russia
- Coordinates: 50°19′N 127°44′E
- Country: Russia
- Region: Amur Oblast
- District: Blagoveshchensky District
- Time zone: UTC+9:00

Ust-Ivanovka (Russian: Усть-Ивановка) is a rural locality (a selo) and the administrative center of Ust-Ivanovsky Selsoviet of Blagoveshchensky District, Amur Oblast, Russia. The population was 2,656 as of 2018. There are 40 streets.

== Geography ==
Ust-Ivanovka is located on left bank of the Zeya River, 26 km northeast of Blagoveshchensk (the district's administrative centre) by road. Rovnoye is the nearest rural locality.
