= Pravovostochnoye =

Pravovostochnoye Правовосточное
- Selo
- Location within Amur Oblast Location within Russia
- Coordinates: 50°19′N 128°11′E
- Country: Russia
- Region: Amur Oblast
- District: Ivanovsky District
- Time zone: UTC+9:00

Pravovostochnoye (Russian: Правовосточное) is a rural locality (a selo) and the administrative center of Pravovostochny Selsoviet of Ivanovsky District, Amur Oblast, Russia. The population was 302 as of 2018. There are 8 streets.

== Geography ==
Pravovostochnoye is located on the right bank of the Manchzhurka River, 16 km east of Ivanovka (the district's administrative centre) by road. Sadovoye is the nearest rural locality.
