= Kamenny Karyer =

Kamenny Karyer Каменный Карьер
- Village
- Location within Amur Oblast Location within Russia
- Coordinates: 49°18′N 130°10′E
- Country: Russia
- Region: Amur Oblast
- District: Arkharinsky District
- Time zone: UTC+9:00

Kamenny Karyer (Russian: Каменный Карьер) is a rural locality (a selo) in Otvazhnensky Selsovet of Arkharinsky District, Amur Oblast, Russia. The population was 111 in 2018. There is 1 street.

== Geography ==
Kamenny Karyer is located 18 km south of Arkhara (the district's administrative centre) by road. Tatakan is the nearest rural locality.
