= Uril, Russia =

Uril Урил
- Selo
- Location within Amur Oblast Location within Russia
- Coordinates: 49°13′N 130°28′E
- Country: Russia
- Region: Amur Oblast
- District: Arkharinsky District
- Time zone: UTC+9:00

Uril (Russian: Урил) is a rural locality (a selo) and the administrative center of Urilsky Selsoviet of Arkharinsky District, Amur Oblast, Russia. The population was 90 in 2018. There are five streets.

== Geography ==
Uril is located near the left bank of the Uril River, 38 kilometres (24 mi) southeast of Arkhara (the district's administrative centre) by road. Rachi is the nearest rural locality.
