= Osezhino =

Osezhino Осежино
- Selo
- Location within Amur Oblast Location within Russia
- Coordinates: 53°17′N 124°24′E
- Country: Russia
- Region: Amur Oblast
- District: Skovorodinsky District
- Time zone: UTC+9:00

Osezhino (Russian: Осежино) is a rural locality (a selo) in Albazinsky Selsoviet of Skovorodinsky District, Amur Oblast, Russia. The population was 11 as of 2018.

== Geography ==
It is located 120 km from Skovorodino, 35 km from Albazino.
