= Novochesnokovo =

Novochesnokovo Новочесноково
- Selo
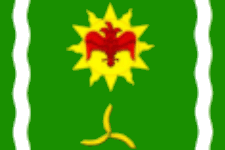
- Flag

- Location within Amur Oblast Location within Russia
- Coordinates: 49°34′N 129°00′E
- Country: Russia
- Region: Amur Oblast
- District: Mikhaylovsky District
- Time zone: UTC+9:00

Novochesnokovo (Russian: Новочесноково) is a rural locality (a selo) and the administrative center of Novochesnokovsky Selsoviet of Mikhaylovsky District, Amur Oblast, Russia. The population was 565 as of 2018. There are 20 streets.

== Geography ==
Novochesnokovo is located on the right bank of the Kupriyanikha River, 29 km southeast of Poyarkovo (the district's administrative centre) by road. Vysokoye is the nearest rural locality.
