= Verkhnebeloye =

Verkhnebeloye Верхнебелое
- Selo
- Location within Amur Oblast Location within Russia
- Coordinates: 50°36′N 128°55′E
- Country: Russia
- Region: Amur Oblast
- District: Romnensky District
- Time zone: UTC+9:00

Verkhnebeloye (Russian: Верхнебелое) is a rural locality (a selo) and the administrative center of Verkhnebelovsky Selsoviet of Romnensky District, Amur Oblast, Russia. The population was 261 as of 2018. There are 5 streets.

== Geography ==
Verkhnebeloye is located on the left bank of the Belaya River, 34 km southwest of Romny (the district's administrative centre) by road. Pozdeyevka is the nearest rural locality.
