= Voskresenovka, Seryshevsky District, Amur Oblast =

Voskresenovka Воскресеновка
- Selo
- Location within Amur Oblast Location within Russia
- Coordinates: 51°01′N 129°18′E
- Country: Russia
- Region: Amur Oblast
- District: Seryshevsky District
- Time zone: UTC+9:00

Voskresenovka (Russian: Воскресеновка) is a rural locality (a selo) in Shirokologsky Selsoviet of Seryshevsky District, Amur Oblast, Russia. The population was 63 as of 2018. There are 5 streets.

== Geography ==
Voskresenovka is located 90 km east of Seryshevo (the district's administrative centre) by road. Sokolovka is the nearest rural locality.
