= Boldyrevka =

Boldyrevka Болдыревка
- Selo
- Location within Amur Oblast Location within Russia
- Coordinates: 50°13′N 129°29′E
- Country: Russia
- Region: Amur Oblast
- District: Zavitinsky District
- Time zone: UTC+9:00

Boldyrevka (Russian: Болдыревка) is a rural locality (a selo) and the administrative center of Boldyrevsky Selsoviet of Zavitinsky District, Amur Oblast, Russia. The population was 485 as of 2018. There are 15 streets.

== Geography ==
Boldyrevka is located on the left bank of the Polovinka River, 18 km north of Zavitinsk (the district's administrative centre) by road. Avramovka is the nearest rural locality.
