= Zigovka =

Zigovka Зиговка
- Selo
- Location within Amur Oblast Location within Russia
- Coordinates: 51°20′N 127°38′E
- Country: Russia
- Region: Amur Oblast
- District: Svobodnensky District
- Time zone: UTC+9:00

Zigovka (Russian: Зиговка) is a rural locality (a selo) in Kostyukovsky Selsoviet of Svobodnensky District, Amur Oblast, Russia. The population was 125 as of 2018. There are 2 streets.

== Geography ==
Zigovka is located 47 km west of Svobodny (the district's administrative centre) by road. Kostyukovka is the nearest rural locality.
