= Tungala =

Tungala Тунгала
- Settlement
- Location within Amur Oblast Location within Russia
- Coordinates: 53°33′N 129°26′E
- Country: Russia
- Region: Amur Oblast
- District: Zeysky District
- Time zone: UTC+9:00

Tungala (Russian: Тунгала) is a rural locality (a settlement) and the administrative center of Tungalinsky Selsoviet of Zeysky District, Amur Oblast, Russia. The population was 553 as of 2018. There are 3 streets.

== Geography ==
Tungala is located 238 km east of Zeya (the district's administrative centre) by road. Ogoron is the nearest rural locality.
