= Gomelevka =

Gomelevka Гомелевка
- Selo
- Location within Amur Oblast Location within Russia
- Coordinates: 49°40′N 129°43′E
- Country: Russia
- Region: Amur Oblast
- District: Bureysky District
- Time zone: UTC+9:00

Gomelevka (Russian: Гомелевка) is a rural locality (a selo) in Malinovsky Selsoviet of Bureysky District, Amur Oblast, Russia. The population was 2 as of 2018. There are 3 streets.

== Geography ==
Gomelevka is located on the right bank of the Bureya River, 21 km southwest of Novobureysky (the district's administrative centre) by road. Ust-Kivda is the nearest rural locality.
