= Zheltoyarovo =

Zheltoyarovo Желтоярово
- Selo
- Location within Amur Oblast Location within Russia
- Coordinates: 51°31′N 128°26′E
- Country: Russia
- Region: Amur Oblast
- District: Svobodnensky District
- Time zone: UTC+9:00

Zheltoyarovo (Russian: Желтоярово) is a rural locality (a selo) and the administrative center of Zheltoyarovsky Selsoviet of Svobodnensky District, Amur Oblast, Russia. The population was 458 as of 2018. There are 6 streets.

== Geography ==
Zheltoyarovo is located on the right bank of the Zeya River, 36 km northeast of Svobodny (the district's administrative centre) by road. Gashchenka is the nearest rural locality.
