= Konstantinogradovka =

Konstantinogradovka Константиноградовка
- Selo
- Location within Amur Oblast Location within Russia
- Coordinates: 50°27′N 128°17′E
- Country: Russia
- Region: Amur Oblast
- District: Ivanovsky District
- Time zone: UTC+9:00

Konstantinogradovka (Russian: Константиноградовка) is a rural locality (a selo) in Konstantinogradovsky Selsoviet of Ivanovsky District, Amur Oblast, Russia. The population was 525 as of 2018. There are 6 streets.

== Geography ==
Konstantinogradovka is located near the right bank of the Kozlovka River, 26 km southwest of Ivanovka (the district's administrative centre) by road. Yerkovtsy is the nearest rural locality.
