= Zolotonozhka =

Zolotonozhka Золотоножка
- Selo
- Location within Amur Oblast Location within Russia
- Coordinates: 49°50′N 128°22′E
- Country: Russia
- Region: Amur Oblast
- District: Konstantinovsky District
- Time zone: UTC+9:00

Zolotonozhka (Russian: Золотоножка) is a rural locality (a selo) in Zolotonozhsky Selsoviet of Konstantinovsky District, Amur Oblast, Russia. The population was 224 as of 2018. There are 3 streets.

== Geography ==
Zolotonozhka is located 48 km northeast of Konstantinovka (the district's administrative centre) by road. Zenkovka is the nearest rural locality.
