= Guran, Amur Oblast =

Guran Гуран
- Selo
- Location within Amur Oblast Location within Russia
- Coordinates: 51°00′N 127°17′E
- Country: Russia
- Region: Amur Oblast
- District: Svobodnensky District
- Time zone: UTC+9:00

Guran (Russian: Гуран) is a rural locality (a selo) in Sychevsky Selsoviet of Svobodnensky District, Amur Oblast, Russia. The population is 132 as of 2018. There are 6 streets.

== Geography ==
Guran is located 87 km southwest of Svobodny (the district's administrative centre) by road. Sychyovka is the nearest rural locality.
