= Tavrichanka =

Tavrichanka Тавричанка
- Selo
- Location within Amur Oblast Location within Russia
- Coordinates: 50°57′N 128°20′E
- Country: Russia
- Region: Amur Oblast
- District: Seryshevsky District
- Time zone: UTC+9:00

Tavrichanka (Russian: Тавричанка) is a rural locality (a selo) in Tomsky Selsoviet of Seryshevsky District, Amur Oblast, Russia. The population was 295 as of 2018. There are 4 streets.

== Geography ==
Tavrichanka is located on the Tom River, 28 km southwest of Seryshevo (the district's administrative centre) by road. Tomskoye is the nearest rural locality.
