= Kakhovka, Amur Oblast =

Kakhovka Каховка
- Selo
- Location within Amur Oblast Location within Russia
- Coordinates: 50°47′N 129°13′E
- Country: Russia
- Region: Amur Oblast
- District: Romnensky District
- Time zone: UTC+9:00

Kakhovka (Russian: Каховка) is a rural locality (a selo) and the administrative center of Kakhovsky Selsoviet of Romnensky District, Amur Oblast, Russia. The population was 313 as of 2018. There are 4 streets.

== Geography ==
Kakhovka is located 11 km north of Romny (the district's administrative centre) by road. Seredinnoye is the nearest rural locality.
