= Fyodorovka, Amur Oblast =

Locality in Russia

Fyodorovka Фёдоровка
- Selo
- Location within Amur Oblast Location within Russia
- Coordinates: 49°55′N 129°16′E
- Country: Russia
- Region: Amur Oblast
- District: Zavitinsky District
- Time zone: UTC+9:00

Fyodorovka (Russian: Фёдоровка) is a rural locality (a selo) in Kupriyanovsky Selsoviet of Zavitinsky District, Amur Oblast, Russia. The population was 26 as of 2018. There are 3 streets.

== Geography ==
Fyodorovka is located 27 km southwest of Zavitinsk (the district's administrative centre) by road. Kupriyanovka is the nearest rural locality.
