= Rezunovka =

Rezunovka Резуновка
- Selo
- Location within Amur Oblast Location within Russia
- Coordinates: 49°48′N 127°45′E
- Country: Russia
- Region: Amur Oblast
- District: Tambovsky District
- Time zone: UTC+9:00

Rezunovka (Russian: Резуновка) is a rural locality (a selo) in Muravyevsky Selsoviet of Tambovsky District, Amur Oblast, Russia. The population was 193 as of 2018. There are 9 streets.

== Geography ==
Rezunovka is located on the Gilchin River, 57 km southwest of Tambovka (the district's administrative centre) by road. Muravyovka is the nearest rural locality.
