= Gulik (village) =

Gulik Гулик
- Selo
- Location within Amur Oblast Location within Russia
- Coordinates: 53°44′N 127°05′E
- Country: Russia
- Region: Amur Oblast
- District: Zeysky District
- Time zone: UTC+9:00

Gulik (Russian: Гулик) is a rural locality (a selo) in Sosnovoborsky Selsoviet of Zeysky District, Amur Oblast, Russia. The population was 297 as of 2018. There are 8 streets.

== Geography ==
Gulik is located on the right bank of the Gulik River, 13 km west of Zeya (the district's administrative centre) by road. Zeya is the nearest rural locality.
