= Ust-Kivda =

Ust-Kivda Усть-Кивда
- Selo
- Location within Amur Oblast Location within Russia
- Coordinates: 49°40′N 129°41′E
- Country: Russia
- Region: Amur Oblast
- District: Bureysky District
- Time zone: UTC+9:00

Ust-Kivda (Russian: Усть-Кивда) is a rural locality (a selo) in Malinovsky Selsoviet of Bureysky District, Amur Oblast, Russia. The population was 156 as of 2018. There are 6 streets.

== Geography ==
Ust-Kivda is located near the right bank of the Bureya River, 24 km southwest of Novobureysky (the district's administrative centre) by road. Novospassk is the nearest rural locality.
