= Astashikha =

Astashikha Асташиха
- Selo
- Location within Amur Oblast Location within Russia
- Coordinates: 49°29′N 129°28′E
- Country: Russia
- Region: Amur Oblast
- District: Bureysky District
- Time zone: UTC+9:00

Astashikha (Russian: Асташиха) is a rural locality (a selo) in Alexeyevsky Selsoviet of Bureysky District, Amur Oblast, Russia. The population was 106 as of 2018. There are 4 streets.

== Geography ==
Astashikha is located 74 km southwest of Novobureysky (the district's administrative centre) by road. Alexeyevka is the nearest rural locality.
