= Kazanka, Amur Oblast =

Kazanka Казанка
- Selo
- Location within Amur Oblast Location within Russia
- Coordinates: 51°04′N 128°03′E
- Country: Russia
- Region: Amur Oblast
- District: Seryshevsky District
- Time zone: UTC+9:00

Kazanka (Russian: Казанка) is a rural locality (a selo) and the administrative center of Kazansky Selsoviet of Seryshevsky District, Amur Oblast, Russia. The population was 450 as of 2018. There are 8 streets.

== Geography ==
Kazanka is located on the Zeya River, 28 km west of Seryshevo (the district's administrative centre) by road. Sretenka is the nearest rural locality.
