= Nadezhdenskoye =

Nadezhdenskoye Надежденское
- Selo
- Location within Amur Oblast Location within Russia
- Coordinates: 50°30′N 127°59′E
- Country: Russia
- Region: Amur Oblast
- District: Ivanovsky District
- Time zone: UTC+9:00

Nadezhdenskoye (Russian: Надежденское) is a rural locality (a selo) in Priozerny Selsoviet of Ivanovsky District, Amur Oblast, Russia. The population was 83 as of 2018.

== Geography ==
Nadezhdenskoye is located 22 km north of Ivanovka (the district's administrative centre) by road. Novoalexeyevka is the nearest rural locality.
