= Tutaul =

Tutaul Тутаул
- Settlement
- Location within Amur Oblast Location within Russia
- Coordinates: 55°01′N 127°27′E
- Country: Russia
- Region: Amur Oblast
- District: Tyndinsky District
- Time zone: UTC+9:00

Tutaul (Russian: Тутаул) is a rural locality (a settlement) in Tutaulsky Selsoviet of Tyndinsky District, Amur Oblast, Russia. The population was 396 as of 2018. There are 4 streets. Tutaul is known for having North Korean logging camps.

== Geography ==
Tutaul is located 820 km east of Tynda (the district's administrative centre) by road.
