= Dronovo =

Dronovo Дроново
- Selo
- Location within Amur Oblast Location within Russia
- Coordinates: 50°10′N 127°50′E
- Country: Russia
- Region: Amur Oblast
- District: Blagoveshchensky District
- Time zone: UTC+9:00

Dronovo (Russian: Дроново) is a rural locality (a selo) in Gribsky Selsoviet of Blagoveshchensky District, Amur Oblast, Russia. The population was 232 as of 2018. There are 4 streets.

== Geography ==
Dronovo is located in the valley of the Bolshoy Alim River, 35 km southeast of Blagoveshchensk (the district's administrative centre) by road. Sadovoye is the nearest rural locality.
