= Krestovozdvizhenka =

Krestovozdvizhenka Крестовоздвиженка
- Selo
- Location within Amur Oblast Location within Russia
- Coordinates: 49°46′N 127°58′E
- Country: Russia
- Region: Amur Oblast
- District: Konstantinovsky District
- Time zone: UTC+9:00

Krestovozdvizhenka (Russian: Крестовоздвиженка) is a rural locality (a selo) in Krestovozdvizhensky Selsoviet of Konstantinovsky District, Amur Oblast, Russia. The population was 987 as of 2018. There are 16 streets.

== Geography ==
Krestovozdvizhenka is located 19 km north of Konstantinovka (the district's administrative centre) by road. Klyuchi is the nearest rural locality.
