= Albazinka =

Albazinka Албазинка
- Selo
- Location within Amur Oblast Location within Russia
- Coordinates: 50°05′N 129°02′E
- Country: Russia
- Region: Amur Oblast
- District: Zavitinsky District
- Time zone: UTC+9:00

Albazinka (Russian: Албазинка) is a rural locality (a selo) and the administrative center of Albazinsky Selsoviet of Zavitinsky District, Amur Oblast, Russia. The population was 179 as of 2018. There are 10 streets.

== Geography ==
Albazinka is located on the left bank of the Zavitaya River, 34 km west of Zavitinsk (the district's administrative centre) by road. Platovo is the nearest rural locality.
