= Rogachevka =

Rogachevka Рогачёвка
- Selo
- Location within Amur Oblast Location within Russia
- Coordinates: 51°16′N 127°50′E
- Country: Russia
- Region: Amur Oblast
- District: Svobodnensky District
- Time zone: UTC+9:00

Rogachevka (Russian: Рогачёвка) is a rural locality (a selo) in Novoivanovsky Selsoviet of Svobodnensky District, Amur Oblast, Russia. The population was 332 as of 2018. There are 5 streets.

== Geography ==
Rogachevka is located 33 km southwest of Svobodny (the district's administrative centre) by road. Serebryanka is the nearest rural locality.
