= Kutilovo =

Kutilovo Кутилово
- Selo
- Location within Amur Oblast Location within Russia
- Coordinates: 50°08′N 128°45′E
- Country: Russia
- Region: Amur Oblast
- District: Oktyabrsky District
- Time zone: UTC+9:00

Kutilovo (Russian: Кутилово) is a rural locality (a selo) in Maksimovsky Selsoviet of Oktyabrsky District, Amur Oblast, Russia. The population was 47 as of 2018. There is 1 street.

== Geography ==
Kutilovo is located on the Dim River, 41 km southwest of Yekaterinoslavka (the district's administrative centre) by road. Maximovka is the nearest rural locality.
