= Semiozyorka =

Semiozyorka Семиозёрка
- Selo
- Location within Amur Oblast Location within Russia
- Coordinates: 50°38′N 127°49′E
- Country: Russia
- Region: Amur Oblast
- District: Ivanovsky District
- Time zone: UTC+9:00

Semiozyorka (Russian: Семиозёрка) is a rural locality (a selo) in Semiozyorsky Selsoviet of Ivanovsky District, Amur Oblast, Russia. The population was 590 as of 2018. There are 13 streets.

== Geography ==
Semiozyorka is located 40 km north of Ivanovka (the district's administrative centre) by road. Beryozovka is the nearest rural locality.
