= Chernoberyozovka =

Chernoberyozovka Черноберёзовка
- Selo
- Location within Amur Oblast Location within Russia
- Coordinates: 49°26′N 130°15′E
- Country: Russia
- Region: Amur Oblast
- District: Arkharinsky District
- Time zone: UTC+9:00

Chernoberyozovka (Russian: Черноберёзовка) is a rural locality (a selo) in Arkadyevsky Selsoviet of Arkharinsky District, Amur Oblast, Russia. The population was 69 as of 2018. There are 3 streets.

== Geography ==
Chernoberyozovka is located on the right bank of the Arkhara River, 14 km east of Arkhara (the district's administrative centre) by road. Arkadyevka is the nearest rural locality.
