= Razlivnaya =

Razlivnaya Разливная
- Selo
- Location within Amur Oblast Location within Russia
- Coordinates: 51°41′N 128°08′E
- Country: Russia
- Region: Amur Oblast
- District: Svobodnensky District
- Time zone: UTC+9:00

Razlivnaya (Russian: Разливная) is a rural locality (a selo) in Chernovsky Selsoviet of Svobodnensky District, Amur Oblast, Russia. The population was 162 as of 2018. There are 4 streets.

== Geography ==
Razlivnaya is located on the right bank of the Bolshaya Pera River, 39 km north of Svobodny (the district's administrative centre) by road. Buzuli is the nearest rural locality.
