= Korshunovka =

Korshunovka Коршуновка
- Selo
- Location within Amur Oblast Location within Russia
- Coordinates: 49°46′N 128°38′E
- Country: Russia
- Region: Amur Oblast
- District: Mikhaylovsky District
- Time zone: UTC+9:00

Korshunovka (Russian: Коршуновка) is a rural locality (a selo) and the administrative center of Korshunovsky Selsoviet of Mikhaylovsky District, Amur Oblast, Russia. The population was 420 as of 2018. There are 7 streets.

== Geography ==
Korshunovka is located on the right bank of the Zavitaya River, 22 km north of Poyarkovo (the district's administrative centre) by road. Cheremisino is the nearest rural locality.
