= Kalinovka, Romnensky District, Amur Oblast =

Kalinovka Калиновка
- Selo
- Location within Amur Oblast Location within Russia
- Coordinates: 50°40′N 129°22′E
- Country: Russia
- Region: Amur Oblast
- District: Romnensky District
- Time zone: UTC+9:00

Kalinovka (Russian: Калиновка) is a rural locality (a selo) in Romnensky Selsoviet of Romnensky District, Amur Oblast, Russia. The population was 192 as of 2018. There are 4 streets.

== Geography ==
Kalinovka is located 9 km southeast of Romny (the district's administrative centre) by road. Romny is the nearest rural locality.
