= Klyuchi, Konstantinovsky District, Amur Oblast =

Klyuchi Ключи
- Selo
- Location within Amur Oblast Location within Russia
- Coordinates: 49°43′N 128°04′E
- Country: Russia
- Region: Amur Oblast
- District: Konstantinovsky District
- Time zone: UTC+9:00

Klyuchi (Russian: Ключи) is a rural locality (a selo) in Klyuchevskoy Selsoviet of Konstantinovsky District, Amur Oblast, Russia. The population was 763 as of 2018. There are 4 streets.

== Geography ==
Klyuchi is located 17 km northeast of Konstantinovka (the district's administrative centre) by road. Krestovozdvizhenka is the nearest rural locality.
