= Lyubimoye =

Lyubimoye Любимое
- Selo
- Location within Amur Oblast Location within Russia
- Coordinates: 50°37′N 129°12′E
- Country: Russia
- Region: Amur Oblast
- District: Romnensky District
- Time zone: UTC+9:00

Lyubimoye (Russian: Любимое) is a rural locality (a selo) in Svyatorussovsky Selsoviet of Romnensky District, Amur Oblast, Russia. The population was 118 as of 2018. There are 3 streets.

== Geography ==
Lyubimoye is located on the right bank of the Belaya River, 16 km southwest of Romny (the district's administrative centre) by road. Svyatorussovka is the nearest rural locality.
