= Shumilovka =

Shumilovka Шумиловка
- Selo
- Location within Amur Oblast Location within Russia
- Coordinates: 49°53′N 129°02′E
- Country: Russia
- Region: Amur Oblast
- District: Mikhaylovsky District
- Time zone: UTC+9:00

Shumilovka (Russian: Шумиловка) is a rural locality (a selo) in Voskresenovsky Selsoviet of Mikhaylovsky District, Amur Oblast, Russia. The population was 53 as of 2018. There are 3 streets.

== Geography ==
Shumilovka is located 51 km northeast of Poyarkovo (the district's administrative centre) by road. Voskresenovka is the nearest rural locality.
