= Sokhatino =

Sokhatino Сохатино
- Selo
- Location within Amur Oblast Location within Russia
- Coordinates: 51°40′N 128°50′E
- Country: Russia
- Region: Amur Oblast
- District: Mazanovsky District
- Time zone: UTC+9:00

Sokhatino (Russian: Сохатино) is a rural locality (a selo) in Praktichansky Selsoviet of Mazanovsky District, Amur Oblast, Russia. The population was 75 as of 2018. There are 3 streets.

== Geography ==
Sokhatino is located on the right bank of the Zeya River, 104 km northwest of Novokiyevsky Uval (the district's administrative centre) by road. Novokiyevka is the nearest rural locality.
