= Lapri =

Lapri Лапри
- Settlement
- Location within Amur Oblast Location within Russia
- Coordinates: 55°41′N 124°54′E
- Country: Russia
- Region: Amur Oblast
- District: Tyndinsky District
- Time zone: UTC+9:00

Lapri (Russian: Лапри) is a rural locality (a settlement) in Mogotsky Selsoviet of Tyndinsky District, Amur Oblast, Russia. The population was 6 as of 2018. There is 1 street.

== Geography ==
Lapri is located 75 km north of Tynda (the district's administrative centre) by road. Mogot is the nearest rural locality.
