= Klyuchevoye, Amur Oblast =

Klyuchevoye Ключевое
- Selo
- Location within Amur Oblast Location within Russia
- Coordinates: 52°18′N 127°13′E
- Country: Russia
- Region: Amur Oblast
- District: Shimanovsky District
- Time zone: UTC+9:00

Klyuchevoye (Russian: Ключевое) is a rural locality (a selo) in Mukhinsky Selsoviet of Shimanovsky District, Amur Oblast, Russia. The population of Klyuchevoye was 363 in 2018. It has 1 street.

== Geography ==
Klyuchevoye is located 66 km northwest of Shimanovsk (the district's administrative centre) by road. Mukhino is the nearest rural locality.
