= Srednebeloye =

Srednebeloye Среднебелое
- Selo
- Location within Amur Oblast Location within Russia
- Coordinates: 50°41′N 128°02′E
- Country: Russia
- Region: Amur Oblast
- District: Ivanovsky District
- Time zone: UTC+9:00

Srednebeloye (Russian: Среднебелое) is a rural locality (a selo) and the administrative center of Novoivanovsky Selsoviet of Ivanovsky District, Amur Oblast, Russia. The population was 716 as of 2018. There are 11 streets.

== Geography ==
Srednebeloye is located on the left bank of the Belaya River, 50 km north of Ivanovka (the district's administrative centre) by road. Srednebelaya is the nearest rural locality.
