= Zagornaya Selitba =

Zagornaya Selitba Загорная Селитьба
- Selo
- Location within Amur Oblast Location within Russia
- Coordinates: 51°08′N 127°14′E
- Country: Russia
- Region: Amur Oblast
- District: Svobodnensky District
- Time zone: UTC+9:00

Zagornaya Selitba (Russian: Загорная Селитьба) is a rural locality (a selo) in Zagorno-Selitbinsky Selsoviet of Svobodnensky District, Amur Oblast, Russia. The population was 443 as of 2018. There are 9 streets.

== Geography ==
Zagornaya Selitba is located 85 km southwest of Svobodny (the district's administrative centre) by road. Sychyovka is the nearest rural locality.
