= Kivdo-Tyukan =

Kivdo-Tyukan Кивдо-Тюкан
- Selo
- Location within Amur Oblast Location within Russia
- Coordinates: 49°50′N 129°40′E
- Country: Russia
- Region: Amur Oblast
- District: Bureysky District
- Time zone: UTC+9:00

Kivdo-Tyukan (Russian: Кивдо-Тюкан) is a rural locality (a selo) in Rabochy posyolok Bureya of Bureysky District, Amur Oblast, Russia. The population was 31 as of 2018. There are 5 streets.

== Geography ==
Kivdo-Tyukan is located 17 km northwest of Novobureysky (the district's administrative centre) by road. Kivdinsky is the nearest rural locality.
