= Yukhta-3 =

Yukhta-3 Юхта-3
- Settlement
- Location within Amur Oblast Location within Russia
- Coordinates: 51°28′N 128°09′E
- Country: Russia
- Region: Amur Oblast
- District: Svobodnensky District
- Time zone: UTC+9:00

Yukhta-3 (Russian: Юхта-3) is a rural locality (a settlement) in Dmitriyevsky Selsoviet of Svobodnensky District, Amur Oblast, Russia. The population was 97 as of 2018. There are 4 streets.

== Geography ==
Yukhta-3 is located on the left bank of the Bolshaya Pyora River, 14 km north of Svobodny (the district's administrative centre) by road. Reneyssans is the nearest rural locality.
