= Malinovka, Shimanovsky District, Amur Oblast =

Malinovka Малиновка
- Selo
- Location within Amur Oblast Location within Russia
- Coordinates: 52°01′N 127°46′E
- Country: Russia
- Region: Amur Oblast
- District: Shimanovsky District
- Time zone: UTC+9:00

Malinovka (Russian: Малиновка) is a rural locality (a selo) and the administrative center of Malinovsky Selsoviet of Shimanovsky District, Amur Oblast, Russia. The population was 150 as of 2018. There are 3 streets.

== Geography ==
Malinovka is located 10 km northeast of Shimanovsk (the district's administrative centre) by road. Shimanovsk is the nearest rural locality.
