= Arga, Amur Oblast =

Arga Арга
- Station
- Location within Amur Oblast Location within Russia
- Coordinates: 51°16′N 128°14′E
- Country: Russia
- Region: Amur Oblast
- District: Seryshevsky District
- Time zone: UTC+9:00

Arga (Russian: Арга) is a rural locality (a station) in Sosnovsky Selsoviet of Seryshevsky District, Amur Oblast, Russia. The population was 568 as of 2018. There are 13 streets.

== Geography ==
Arga is located 23 km northwest of Seryshevo (the district's administrative centre) by road. Ozyornoye is the nearest rural locality.
