= Arkadyevka =

Arkadyevka Аркадьевка
- Village
- Location within Amur Oblast Location within Russia
- Coordinates: 49°24′N 130°08′E
- Country: Russia
- Region: Amur Oblast
- District: Arkharinsky District
- Time zone: UTC+9:00

Arkadyevka (Russian: Аркадьевка) is a rural locality (a selo) and the administrative center of Arkadyevsky Selsoviet of Arkharinsky District, Amur Oblast, Russia. The population was 631 in 2018. There are 17 streets.

== Geography ==
Arkadyevka is located on the right bank of the Arkhara River, 5 km southeast of Arkhara (the district's administrative centre) by road. Arkhara is the nearest rural locality.
