= Novopokrovka, Amur Oblast =

Novopokrovka Новопокровка
- Selo
- Location within Amur Oblast Location within Russia
- Coordinates: 48°54′N 130°12′E
- Country: Russia
- Region: Amur Oblast
- District: Arkharinsky District
- Time zone: UTC+9:00

Novopokrovka (Russian: Новопокровка) is a rural locality (a selo) in Kasatkinsky Selsoviet of Arkharinsky District, Amur Oblast, Russia. The population was 77 as of 2018. There are 3 streets.

== Geography ==
Novopokrovka is located on the left bank of the Amur River, 79 km south of Arkhara (the district's administrative centre) by road. Kasatkino is the nearest rural locality.
