= Nizhniye Buzuli =

Nizhniye Buzuli Нижние Бузули
- Selo
- Location within Amur Oblast Location within Russia
- Coordinates: 51°37′N 128°11′E
- Country: Russia
- Region: Amur Oblast
- District: Svobodnensky District
- Time zone: UTC+9:00 (CET)

Nizhniye Buzuli (Russian: Нижние Бузули) is a rural locality (a selo) and the administrative center of Nizhnebuzulinsky Selsoviet of Svobodnensky District, Amur Oblast, Russia. The population is 1,000 as of 2018.

== Geography ==
The village is located on the bank of the Buzulka River, 30 km north from Svobodny.
