= Vozzhayevka (village) =

Vozzhayevka Возжаевка
- Selo
- Location within Amur Oblast Location within Russia
- Coordinates: 50°43′N 128°42′E
- Country: Russia
- Region: Amur Oblast
- District: Belogorsky District
- Time zone: UTC+9:00

Vozzhayevka (Russian: Возжаевка) is a rural locality (a selo) in Vozzhayevsky Selsoviet of Belogorsky District, Amur Oblast, Russia. The population was 5,068 as of 2018. There are 20 streets.

== Geography ==
Vozzhayevka is located on Trans-Siberian Railway, 34 km southeast of Belogorsk (the district's administrative centre) by road. Amurskoye is the nearest rural locality.
