= Yasnaya Polyana, Amur Oblast =

Yasnaya Polyana Ясная Поляна
- Selo
- Location within Amur Oblast Location within Russia
- Coordinates: 50°29′N 129°19′E
- Country: Russia
- Region: Amur Oblast
- District: Oktyabrsky District
- Time zone: UTC+9:00

Yasnaya Polyana (Russian: Ясная Поляна) is a rural locality (a selo) in Smelovsky Selsoviet of Oktyabrsky District, Amur Oblast, Russia. The population was 2 as of 2018. There is 1 street.

== Geography ==
Yasnaya Polyana is located 40 km northeast of Yekaterinoslavka (the district's administrative centre) by road. Belyakovka is the nearest rural locality.
