= Talali, Amur Oblast =

Talali Талали
- Selo
- Location within Amur Oblast Location within Russia
- Coordinates: 51°32′N 127°15′E
- Country: Russia
- Region: Amur Oblast
- District: Svobodnensky District
- Time zone: UTC+9:00

Talali (Russian: Талали) is a rural locality (a selo) in Klimoutsevsky Selsoviet of Svobodnensky District, Amur Oblast, Russia. The population was 250 as of 2018. There are 5 streets.

== Geography ==
Talali is located 79 km northwest of Svobodny (the district's administrative centre) by road. Klimoutsy is the nearest rural locality.
