= Pautovka =

Pautovka Паутовка
- Selo
- Location within Amur Oblast Location within Russia
- Coordinates: 51°19′N 129°05′E
- Country: Russia
- Region: Amur Oblast
- District: Mazanovsky District
- Time zone: UTC+9:00

Pautovka (Russian: Паутовка) is a rural locality (a selo) in Dmitriyevsky Selsoviet of Mazanovsky District, Amur Oblast, Russia. The population was 98 as of 2018. There are 5 streets.

== Geography ==
Pautovka is located on the left bank of the Birma River, 57 km south of Novokiyevsky Uval (the district's administrative centre) by road. Margaritovka is the nearest rural locality.
