= Borispol, Amur Oblast =

Borispol Борисполь
- Selo
- Location within Amur Oblast Location within Russia
- Coordinates: 51°02′N 128°34′E
- Country: Russia
- Region: Amur Oblast
- District: Seryshevsky District
- Time zone: UTC+9:00

Borispol (Russian: Борисполь) is a rural locality (a selo) in Frolovsky Selsoviet of Seryshevsky District, Amur Oblast, Russia. The population was 210 as of 2018. There are 5 streets.

== Geography ==
Borispol is located 21 km southeast of Seryshevo (the district's administrative centre) by road. Frolovka is the nearest rural locality.
