= Sadovoye, Ivanovsky District, Amur Oblast =

Sadovoye Садовое
- Selo
- Location within Amur Oblast Location within Russia
- Coordinates: 50°20′N 128°09′E
- Country: Russia
- Region: Amur Oblast
- District: Ivanovsky District
- Time zone: UTC+9:00

Sadovoye (Russian: Садовое) is a rural locality (a selo) in Pravovostochny Selsoviet of Ivanovsky District, Amur Oblast, Russia. The population was 98 as of 2018. There are 2 streets.

== Geography ==
Sadovoye is located on the right bank of the Manchzhurka River, 14 km east of Ivanovka (the district's administrative centre) by road. Pravovostochnoye is the nearest rural locality.
