= Belyakovka =

Belyakovka Беляковка
- Selo
- Location within Amur Oblast Location within Russia
- Coordinates: 50°27′N 129°23′E
- Country: Russia
- Region: Amur Oblast
- District: Oktyabrsky District
- Time zone: UTC+9:00

Belyakovka (Russian: Беляковка) is a rural locality (a selo) in Smelovsky Selsoviet of Oktyabrsky District, Amur Oblast, Russia. According to a 2018 census, the population was 68. There is one street.

== Geography ==
Belyakovka is 46 km northeast of Yekaterinoslavka (the administrative center of the district) by road. Yasnaya Polyana is the nearest rural locality.
