= Sergeye-Fyodorovka =

Sergeye-Fyodorovka Сергее-Фёдоровка
- Selo
- Location within Amur Oblast Location within Russia
- Coordinates: 50°13′N 129°10′E
- Country: Russia
- Region: Amur Oblast
- District: Oktyabrsky District
- Time zone: UTC+9:00

Sergeye-Fyodorovka (Russian: Сергее-Фёдоровка) is a rural locality (a selo) in Novomikhaylovsky Selsoviet of Oktyabrsky District, Amur Oblast, Russia. The population was 119 as of 2018. There is 1 street.

== Geography ==
Sergeye-Fyodorovka is located 28 km south of Yekaterinoslavka (the district's administrative centre) by road. Novomikhaylovka is the nearest rural locality.
