= Beloyarovo =

Beloyarovo Белоярово
- Selo
- Location within Amur Oblast Location within Russia
- Coordinates: 51°35′N 128°46′E
- Country: Russia
- Region: Amur Oblast
- District: Mazanovsky District
- Time zone: UTC+9:00

Beloyarovo (Russian: Белоярово) is a rural locality (a selo) and the administrative center of Beloyarovsky Selsoviet of Mazanovsky District, Amur Oblast, Russia. The population was 907 as of 2018. There are 13 streets.

== Geography ==
Beloyarovo is located on the left bank of the Zeya River, 14 km southwest of Novokiyevsky Uval (the district's administrative centre) by road. Mazanovo is the nearest rural locality.
