= Belonogovo =

Belonogovo Белоногово
- Selo
- Location within Amur Oblast Location within Russia
- Coordinates: 51°07′N 128°21′E
- Country: Russia
- Region: Amur Oblast
- District: Seryshevsky District
- Time zone: UTC+9:00

Belonogovo (Russian: Белоногово) is a rural locality (a selo) in Ozyornensky Selsoviet of Seryshevsky District, Amur Oblast, Russia. The population was 1,345 as of 2018. There are 10 streets.

== Geography ==
Belonogovo is located 8 km north of Seryshevo (the district's administrative centre) by road. Seryshevo is the nearest rural locality.
