= Cherkasovka =

Cherkasovka Черкасовка
- Selo
- Location within Amur Oblast Location within Russia
- Coordinates: 50°26′N 128°32′E
- Country: Russia
- Region: Amur Oblast
- District: Ivanovsky District
- Time zone: UTC+9:00

Cherkasovka (Russian: Черкасовка) is a rural locality (a selo) in Yerkovetsky Selsoviet of Ivanovsky District, Amur Oblast, Russia. The population was 33 as of 2018. There are 2 streets.

== Geography ==
Cherkasovka is located on the left bank of the Kozlovka River, 47 km east of Ivanovka (the district's administrative centre) by road. Preobrazhenovka is the nearest rural locality.
