= Rublyovka, Amur Oblast =

Rublyovka Рублёвка
- Selo
- Location within Amur Oblast Location within Russia
- Coordinates: 53°14′N 127°10′E
- Country: Russia
- Region: Amur Oblast
- District: Zeysky District
- Time zone: UTC+9:00

Rublyovka (Russian: Рублёвка) is a rural locality (a selo) in Umlekansky Selsoviet of Zeysky District, Amur Oblast, Russia. The population was 84 as of 2018. There are 4 streets.

== Geography ==
Rublyovka is located near the left bank of the Zeya River, 82 km south of Zeya (the district's administrative centre) by road. Umlekan is the nearest rural locality.
