= Tyukan =

Tyukan Тюкан
- Station
- Location within Amur Oblast Location within Russia
- Coordinates: 49°57′N 129°37′E
- Country: Russia
- Region: Amur Oblast
- District: Bureysky District
- Time zone: UTC+9:00

Tyukan (Russian: Тюкан) is a rural locality (a station) in Rabochy posyolok Bureya of Bureysky District, Amur Oblast, Russia. The population was 6 as of 2018. There is 1 street.

== Geography ==
The village is located in the valley of the Sredny Tyukan River, 22 km west from Bureya.
