= Kreshchenovka =

Kreshchenovka Крещеновка
- Selo
- Location within Amur Oblast Location within Russia
- Coordinates: 50°16′N 127°57′E
- Country: Russia
- Region: Amur Oblast
- District: Ivanovsky District
- Time zone: UTC+9:00

Kreshchenovka (Russian: Крещеновка) is a rural locality (a selo) in Ivanovsky Selsoviet of Ivanovsky District, Amur Oblast, Russia. The population was 166 as of 2018. There are three streets.

== Geography ==
Kreshchenovka is located 14 km south of Ivanovka (the district's administrative centre) by road. Lozovoye is the nearest rural locality.
