= Dalnevostochnoye =

Dalnevostochnoye Дальневосточное
- Selo
- Location within Amur Oblast Location within Russia
- Coordinates: 50°31′N 128°52′E
- Country: Russia
- Region: Amur Oblast
- District: Romnensky District
- Time zone: UTC+9:00

Dalnevostochnoye (Russian: Дальневосточное) is a rural locality (a selo) and the administrative center of Dalnevostochny Selsoviet of Romnensky District, Amur Oblast, Russia. The population was 250 as of 2018. There are 11 streets.

== Geography ==
Dalnevostochnoye is located 47 km southwest of Romny (the district's administrative centre) by road. Grigoryevka is the nearest rural locality.
