= Tryokhrechye =

Tryokhrechye Трёхречье
- Selo
- Location within Amur Oblast Location within Russia
- Coordinates: 50°05′N 129°52′E
- Country: Russia
- Region: Amur Oblast
- District: Bureysky District
- Time zone: UTC+9:00

Tryokhrechye (Russian: Трёхречье) is a rural locality (a selo) in Rodionovsky Selsoviet of Bureysky District, Amur Oblast, Russia. The population was 32 as of 2018.

== Geography ==
Tryokhrechye is located 45 km north of Novobureysky (the district's administrative centre) by road. Semyonovka is the nearest rural locality.
