= Novy Byt =

Novy Byt Новый Быт
- Selo
- Location within Amur Oblast Location within Russia
- Coordinates: 50°54′N 129°07′E
- Country: Russia
- Region: Amur Oblast
- District: Romnensky District
- Time zone: UTC+9:00

Novy Byt (Russian: Новый Быт) is a rural locality (a selo) in Kakhovsky Selsoviet of Romnensky District, Amur Oblast, Russia. The population was 144 as of 2018. There are 2 streets.

== Geography ==
Novy Byt is located on the left bank of the Tom River, 38 km north of Romny (the district's administrative centre) by road. Shiroky Log is the nearest rural locality.
