= Nikolayevka-2 =

Nikolayevka-2 Николаевка-2
- Selo
- Location within Amur Oblast Location within Russia
- Coordinates: 53°35′N 127°01′E
- Country: Russia
- Region: Amur Oblast
- District: Zeysky District
- Time zone: UTC+9:00

Nikolayevka-2 (Russian: Николаевка-2) is a rural locality (a selo) in Nikolayevsky Selsoviet of Zeysky District, Amur Oblast, Russia. The population was 20 as of 2018. There are 7 streets.

== Geography ==
Nikolayevka-2 is located 33 km southwest of Zeya (the district's administrative centre) by road. Nikolayevka is the nearest rural locality.
