= Praktichi =

Praktichi Практичи
- Selo
- Location within Amur Oblast Location within Russia
- Coordinates: 51°38′N 128°43′E
- Country: Russia
- Region: Amur Oblast
- District: Mazanovsky District
- Time zone: UTC+9:00

Praktichi (Russian: Практичи) is a rural locality (a selo) and the administrative center of Praktichansky Selsoviet of Mazanovsky District, Amur Oblast, Russia. The population was 385 as of 2018. There are 5 streets.

== Geography ==
Praktichi is located 92 km west of Novokiyevsky Uval (the district's administrative centre) by road. Novonikolsk is the nearest rural locality.
