= Sukromli =

Sukromli Сукромли
- Selo
- Location within Amur Oblast Location within Russia
- Coordinates: 51°31′N 127°51′E
- Country: Russia
- Region: Amur Oblast
- District: Svobodnensky District
- Time zone: UTC+9:00

Sukromli (Russian: Сукромли) is a rural locality (a selo) in Semyonovsky Selsoviet of Svobodnensky District, Amur Oblast, Russia. The population was 130 as of 2018. There are two streets.

== Geography ==
Sukromli is located 29 km northwest of Svobodny (the district's administrative centre) by road. Semyonovka is the nearest rural locality.
