= Vadimovo =

Vadimovo Вадимово
- Selo
- Location within Amur Oblast Location within Russia
- Coordinates: 50°24′N 127°22′E
- Country: Russia
- Region: Amur Oblast
- District: Blagoveshchensky District
- Time zone: UTC+9:00

Vadimovo (Russian: Вадимово) is a rural locality (a selo) in Chigirinsky Selsoviet of Blagoveshchensky District, Amur Oblast, Russia. The population was 2 as of 2018.

== Geography ==
The village is located on the left bank of the Amur River, km southeast of Blagoveshchensk (the district's administrative centre) by road.
