= Olginsk =

Olginsk Ольгинск
- Settlement
- Location within Amur Oblast Location within Russia
- Coordinates: 52°52′N 133°24′E
- Country: Russia
- Region: Amur Oblast
- District: Selemdzhinsky District
- Time zone: UTC+9:00

Olginsk (Russian: Ольгинск) is a rural locality (a settlement) in Zlatoutovsky Selsoviet of Selemdzhinsky District, Amur Oblast, Russia. The population was 103 as of 2018. There are 3 streets.

== Geography ==
Olginsk is located in the valley of the Bolshaya Elga River, 61 km southeast of Ekimchan (the district's administrative centre) by road. Ivanovskoye is the nearest rural locality.
