= Algach =

Algach Алгач
- Selo
- Location within Amur Oblast Location within Russia
- Coordinates: 53°23′N 126°59′E
- Country: Russia
- Region: Amur Oblast
- District: Zeysky District
- Time zone: UTC+9:00

Algach (Russian: Алгач) is a rural locality (a selo) in Algachinsky Selsoviet of Zeysky District, Amur Oblast, Russia. The population was 442 as of 2018. There are 6 streets.

== Geography ==
Algach is located on the left bank of the Zeya River, 59 km southwest of Zeya (the district's administrative centre) by road. Chalbachi is the nearest rural locality.
