= Polyakovsky =

Polyakovsky Поляковский
- Settlement
- Location within Amur Oblast Location within Russia
- Coordinates: 52°59′N 127°32′E
- Country: Russia
- Region: Amur Oblast
- District: Zeysky District
- Time zone: UTC+9:00

Polyakovsky (Russian: Поляковский) is a rural locality (a settlement) and the administrative center of Polyakovsky Selsoviet of Zeysky District, Amur Oblast, Russia. The population was 278 as of 2018. There are 9 streets.

== Geography ==
Polyakovsky is located on the left bank of the Zeya River, 130 km south of Zeya (the district's administrative centre) by road. Yubileyny is the nearest rural locality.
