= Voronzha =

Voronzha Воронжа
- Selo
- Location within Amur Oblast Location within Russia
- Coordinates: 51°09′N 128°06′E
- Country: Russia
- Region: Amur Oblast
- District: Seryshevsky District
- Time zone: UTC+9:00

Voronzha (Russian: Воронжа) is a rural locality (a selo) in Bolshesazansky Selsoviet of Seryshevsky District, Amur Oblast, Russia. The population was 49 as of 2018. There is 1 street.

== Geography ==
Voronzha is located 31 km northwest of Seryshevo (the district's administrative centre) by road. Bolshaya Sazanka is the nearest rural locality.
