= Zolotaya Gora =

Zolotaya Gora Золотая Гора
- Selo
- Location within Amur Oblast Location within Russia
- Coordinates: 54°16′N 126°38′E
- Country: Russia
- Region: Amur Oblast
- District: Zeysky District
- Time zone: UTC+9:00

Zolotaya Gora (Russian: Золотая Гора) is a rural locality (a selo) in Sosnovoborsky Selsoviet of Zeysky District, Amur Oblast, Russia. The population was 62 as of 2018. There are 4 streets.

== Geography ==
Zolotaya Gora is located 88 km north of Zeya (the district's administrative centre) by road. Kirovsky is the nearest rural locality.
