= Busse, Amur Oblast =

Busse Буссе
- Selo
- Location within Amur Oblast Location within Russia
- Coordinates: 51°13′N 126°54′E
- Country: Russia
- Region: Amur Oblast
- District: Svobodnensky District
- Time zone: UTC+9:00

Busse (Russian: Буссе) is a rural locality (a selo) and the administrative center of Petropavlovsky Selsoviet of Svobodnensky District, Amur Oblast, Russia. The population was 505 as of 2018. There are 9 streets.

== Geography ==
Busse is located on the left bank of the Amur River, 114 km southwest of Svobodny (the district's administrative centre) by road. Zagornaya Selitba is the nearest rural locality.
