= Saskal =

Saskal Саскаль
- Selo
- Location within Amur Oblast Location within Russia
- Coordinates: 51°38′N 126°55′E
- Country: Russia
- Region: Amur Oblast
- District: Shimanovsky District
- Time zone: UTC+9:00

Saskal (Russian: Саскаль) is a rural locality (a selo) in Saskalinsky Selsoviet of Shimanovsky District, Amur Oblast, Russia. The population was 502 as of 2018. There are 7 streets.

== Geography ==
Saskal is located on the Bereya River, 78 km southwest of Shimanovsk (the district's administrative centre) by road. Simonovo and Novogeorgiyevka are the nearest rural localities.
