= Bugorki =

Bugorki Бугорки
- Selo
- Location within Amur Oblast Location within Russia
- Coordinates: 54°06′N 124°41′E
- Country: Russia
- Region: Amur Oblast
- District: Tyndinsky District
- Time zone: UTC+9:00

Bugorki (Russian: Бугорки) is a rural locality (a selo) in Urkansky Selsoviet of Tyndinsky District, Amur Oblast, Russia. Its population was 62 in 2018. There are five streets.

== Geography ==
Bugorki is located on the Dzhalinda River, 151 km south of Tynda (the district's administrative centre) by road. Urkan is the nearest rural locality.
