= Velikoknyazevka =

Velikoknyazevka Великокнязевка
- Selo
- Location within Amur Oblast Location within Russia
- Coordinates: 50°54′N 127°54′E
- Country: Russia
- Region: Amur Oblast
- District: Belogorsky District
- Time zone: UTC+9:00

Velikoknyazevka (Russian: Великокнязевка) is a rural locality (a selo) and the administrative center of Velikoknyazevsky Selsoviet of Belogorsky District, Amur Oblast, Russia. The population was 755 as of 2018. There are 8 streets.

== Geography ==
Velikoknyazevka is located 51 km west of Belogorsk (the district's administrative centre) by road. Novoandreyevka is the nearest rural locality.
