= Ulyagir =

Ulyagir Улягир
- Settlement
- Location within Amur Oblast Location within Russia
- Coordinates: 54°02′N 123°16′E
- Country: Russia
- Region: Amur Oblast
- District: Skovorodinsky District
- Time zone: UTC+9:00

Ulyagir (Russian: Улягир) is a rural locality (a settlement) in Rabochy Posyolok Urusha of Skovorodinsky District, Amur Oblast, Russia. The population was 2 as of 2018.

== Geography ==
Ulyagir is located 63 km west of Skovorodino (the district's administrative centre) by road. Madalan is the nearest rural locality.
