= Novookhochye =

Novookhochye Новоохочье
- Selo
- Location within Amur Oblast Location within Russia
- Coordinates: 51°13′13″N 128°33′35″E
- Country: Russia
- Region: Amur Oblast
- District: Seryshevsky District
- Time zone: UTC+9:00

Novookhochye (Russian: Новоохочье) is a rural locality (a selo) in Ukrainsky Selsoviet of Seryshevsky District, Amur Oblast, Russia. The population was 115 as of 2018. There is 1 street.

== Geography ==
Novookhochye is located 26 km northeast of Seryshevo (the district's administrative centre) by road. Dobryanka and Ukrainka are the nearest rural localities.
