= Nizhnaya Poltavka =

Nizhnaya Poltavka Нижняя Полтавка
- Selo
- Location within Amur Oblast Location within Russia
- Coordinates: 49°42′N 128°14′E
- Country: Russia
- Region: Amur Oblast
- District: Konstantinovsky District
- Time zone: UTC+9:00

Nizhnaya Poltavka (Russian: Нижняя Полтавка) is a rural locality (a selo) in Nizhnepoltavsky Selsoviet of Konstantinovsky District, Amur Oblast, Russia. The population was 1,177 as of 2018. There are 12 streets.

== Geography ==
Nizhnaya Poltavka is located 31 km northeast of Konstantinovka (the district's administrative centre) by road. Klyuchi is the nearest rural locality.
