= Savelyevka =

Savelyevka Савельевка
- Selo
- Location within Amur Oblast Location within Russia
- Coordinates: 50°41′N 128°12′E
- Country: Russia
- Region: Amur Oblast
- District: Belogorsky District
- Time zone: UTC+9:00

Savelyevka (Russian: Савельевка) is a rural locality (a selo) in Lokhvitsky Selsoviet of Belogorsky District, Amur Oblast, Russia. The population was 111 as of 2018. There is 1 street.

== Geography ==
Savelyevka is located 41 km southwest of Belogorsk (the district's administrative centre) by road. Lokhvitsy is the nearest rural locality.
