= Koroli =

Koroli Короли
- Selo
- Location within Amur Oblast Location within Russia
- Coordinates: 50°28′N 129°01′E
- Country: Russia
- Region: Amur Oblast
- District: Oktyabrsky District
- Time zone: UTC+9:00

Koroli (Russian: Короли) is a rural locality (a selo) and the administrative center of Korolinsky Selsoviet of Oktyabrsky District, Amur Oblast, Russia. The population was 207 as of 2018. There are 4 streets.

== Geography ==
Koroli is located 17 km north of Yekaterinoslavka (the district's administrative centre) by road. Georgiyevka is the nearest rural locality.
