= Margaritovka =

Margaritovka Маргаритовка
- Selo
- Location within Amur Oblast Location within Russia
- Coordinates: 51°19′N 129°12′E
- Country: Russia
- Region: Amur Oblast
- District: Mazanovsky District
- Time zone: UTC+9:00

Margaritovka (Russian: Маргаритовка) is a rural locality (a selo) in Margaritovsky Selsoviet of Mazanovsky District, Amur Oblast, Russia. The population was 329 as of 2018. There are 15 streets.

== Geography ==
Margaritovka is located 67 km southeast of Novokiyevsky Uval (the district's administrative centre) by road. Pautovka is the nearest rural locality.
