= Sadovoye, Tambovsky District, Amur Oblast =

Rural locality in Tambovsky District, Amur Oblast, Russia

Sadovoye Садовое
- Selo
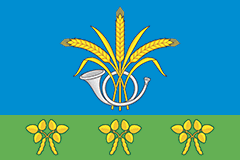
- Flag

- Location within Amur Oblast Location within Russia
- Coordinates: 50°09′N 127°52′E
- Country: Russia
- Region: Amur Oblast
- District: Tambovsky District
- Time zone: UTC+9:00

Sadovoye (Russian: Садовое) is a rural locality (a selo) and the administrative center of Sadovsky Selsoviet of Tambovsky District, Amur Oblast, Russia. The population was 865 as of 2018. There are 12 streets.

== Geography ==
Sadovoye is located 19 km northwest of Tambovka (the district's administrative centre) by road. Dronovo is the nearest rural locality.
