= Chergali =

Chergali Чергали
- Selo
- Location within Amur Oblast Location within Russia
- Coordinates: 50°51′N 129°23′E
- Country: Russia
- Region: Amur Oblast
- District: Romnensky District
- Time zone: UTC+9:00

Chergali (Russian: Чергали) is a rural locality (a selo) and the administrative center of Chergalinsky Selsoviet of Romnensky District, Amur Oblast, Russia. The population was 270 as of 2018. There are 7 streets.

== Geography ==
Chergali is located 22 km north of Romny (the district's administrative centre) by road. Khokhlatskoye is the nearest rural locality.
