= Goluboye =

Goluboye Голубое
- Selo
- Location within Amur Oblast Location within Russia
- Coordinates: 51°47′N 127°58′E
- Country: Russia
- Region: Amur Oblast
- District: Svobodnensky District
- Time zone: UTC+9:00
- Postal code: 676438

Goluboye (Russian: Голубое) is a rural locality (a selo) in Kurgansky Selsoviet of Svobodnensky District, Amur Oblast, Russia. The population was 189 as of 2018. There are 7 streets.

== Geography ==
Goluboye is located on the Dzhatva River, 57 km north of Svobodny (the district's administrative centre) by road. Glukhari is the nearest rural locality.
