= Kalinino, Amur Oblast =

Kalinino Калинино
- Selo
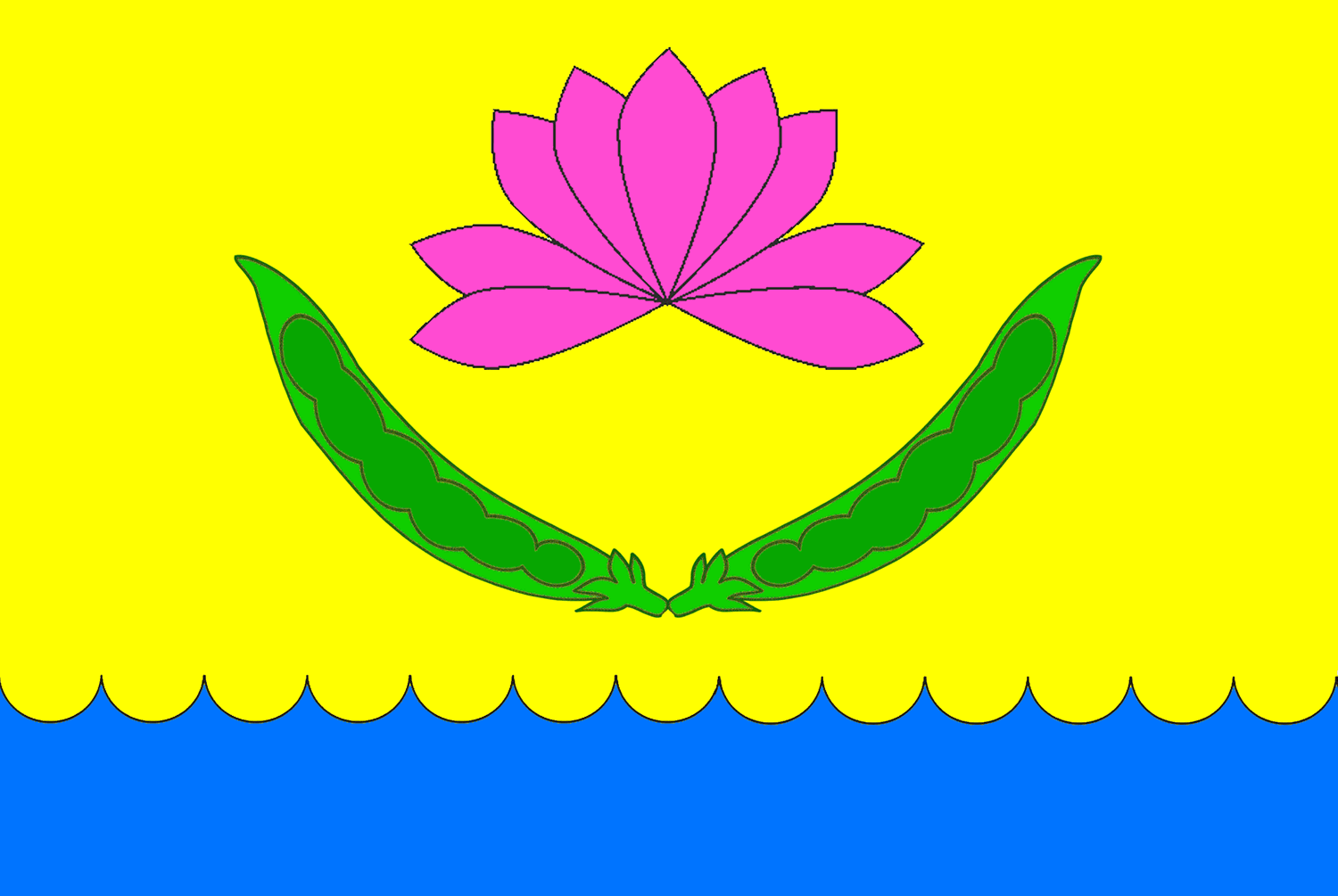
- Flag

- Location within Amur Oblast Location within Russia
- Coordinates: 49°23′N 129°17′E
- Country: Russia
- Region: Amur Oblast
- District: Mikhaylovsky District
- Time zone: UTC+9:00

Kalinino (Russian: Калинино) is a rural locality (a selo) and the administrative center of Kalininsky Selsoviet of Mikhaylovsky District, Amur Oblast, Russia. The population was 580 as of 2018. There are 10 streets.

== Geography ==
Kalinino is located on the left bank of the Amur River, 63 km southeast of Poyarkovo (the district's administrative centre) by road. Vinnikovo is the nearest rural locality.
