= Kasatkino =

Kasatkino Касаткино
- Village
- Location within Amur Oblast Location within Russia
- Coordinates: 48°58′N 130°04′E
- Country: Russia
- Region: Amur Oblast
- District: Arkharinsky District
- Time zone: UTC+9:00

Kasatkino (Russian: Касаткино) is a rural locality (a selo) and the administrative center of Kasatkinsky Selsoviet of Arkharinsky District, Amur Oblast, Russia. The population was 242 in 2018. There are 14 streets.

== Geography ==
Kasatkino is located on the left bank of the Amur River, 66 km south of Arkhara (the district's administrative centre) by road. Novopokrovka is the nearest rural locality.
