= Fevralskoye =

Fevralskoye Февральское
- Selo
- Location within Amur Oblast Location within Russia
- Coordinates: 52°29′N 130°52′E
- Country: Russia
- Region: Amur Oblast
- District: Selemdzhinsky District
- Time zone: UTC+9:00

Fevralskoye (Russian: Февральское) is a rural locality (a selo) in Rabochy Posyolok Fevralsk of Selemdzhinsky District, Amur Oblast, Russia. The population was 323 as of 2018. There are 10 streets.

== Geography ==
Fevralskoye is located 204 km southwest of Ekimchan (the district's administrative centre) by road. Fevralsk is the nearest rural locality.
