= Chagoyan =

Chagoyan Чагоян
- Selo
- Location within Amur Oblast Location within Russia
- Coordinates: 52°07′N 128°12′E
- Country: Russia
- Region: Amur Oblast
- District: Shimanovsky District
- Time zone: UTC+9:00

Chagoyan (Russian: Чагоян) is a rural locality (a selo) in Chagoyansky Selsoviet of Shimanovsky District, Amur Oblast, Russia. The population was 333 as of 2018. There are 13 streets.

== Geography ==
Chagoyan is located on the Zeya River, 45 km east of Shimanovsk (the district's administrative centre) by road. Malinovka is the nearest rural locality.
