= Vernoye, Amur Oblast =

Vernoye Верное
- Selo
- Location within Amur Oblast Location within Russia
- Coordinates: 51°11′N 128°41′E
- Country: Russia
- Region: Amur Oblast
- District: Seryshevsky District
- Time zone: UTC+9:00

Vernoye (Russian: Верное) is a rural locality (a selo) in Ukrainsky Selsoviet of Seryshevsky District, Amur Oblast, Russia. The population was 129 as of 2018. There are 2 streets.

== Geography ==
Vernoye is located 27 km northeast of Seryshevo (the district's administrative centre) by road. Sosnovka is the nearest rural locality.
