= Pravaya Raychikha =

Pravaya Raychikha Правая Райчиха
- Selo
- Location within Amur Oblast Location within Russia
- Coordinates: 49°37′N 129°16′E
- Country: Russia
- Region: Amur Oblast
- District: Bureysky District
- Time zone: UTC+9:00

Pravaya Raychikha (Russian: Правая Райчиха) is a rural locality (a selo) in Uspenovsky Selsoviet of Bureysky District, Amur Oblast, Russia. The population was 23 as of 2018. There are 2 streets.

== Geography ==
Pravaya Raychikha is located on the right bank of the Raychikha River, 74 km southwest of Novobureysky (the district's administrative centre) by road. Uspenovka is the nearest rural locality.
