= Nizhnezavitinka =

Nizhnezavitinka Нижнезавитинка
- Selo
- Location within Amur Oblast Location within Russia
- Coordinates: 49°49′N 128°42′E
- Country: Russia
- Region: Amur Oblast
- District: Mikhaylovsky District
- Time zone: UTC+9:00

Nizhnezavitinka (Russian: Нижнезавитинка) is a rural locality (a selo) in Korshunovsky Selsoviet of Mikhaylovsky District, Amur Oblast, Russia. The population was 54 as of 2018.

== Geography ==
The village is located on the right bank of the Zavitaya River, 28 km north from Poyarkovo.
