= Vostochny, Tyndinsky District, Amur Oblast =

Vostochny Восточный
- Settlement
- Location within Amur Oblast Location within Russia
- Coordinates: 55°10′N 124°54′E
- Country: Russia
- Region: Amur Oblast
- District: Tyndinsky District
- Time zone: UTC+9:00

Vostochny (Russian: Восточный) is a rural locality (a settlement) in Vostochny Selsoviet of Tyndinsky District, Amur Oblast, Russia. The population was 1,191 as of 2018. There are 18 streets.

== Geography ==
Vostochny is located 15 km northeast of Tynda (the district's administrative centre) by road. Tynda is the nearest rural locality.
