= Kanikurgan =

Kanikurgan Каникурган
- Selo
- Location within Amur Oblast Location within Russia
- Coordinates: 50°12′N 127°37′E
- Country: Russia
- Region: Amur Oblast
- District: Blagoveshchensky District
- Time zone: UTC+9:00

Kanikurgan (Russian: Каникурган) is a rural locality (a selo) in Grodekovsky Selsoviet of Blagoveshchensky District, Amur Oblast, Russia. The population was 233 as of 2018. There are 4 streets.

== Geography ==
Kanikurgan is located on the left bank of the Amur River, 25 km southeast of Blagoveshchensk (the district's administrative centre) by road. Zarechny is the nearest rural locality.
