= Kamyshevka, Amur Oblast =

Kamyshevka Камышевка
- Selo
- Location within Amur Oblast Location within Russia
- Coordinates: 50°52′N 128°13′E
- Country: Russia
- Region: Amur Oblast
- District: Belogorsky District
- Time zone: UTC+9:00

Kamyshevka (Russian: Камышевка) is a rural locality (a selo) in Nekrasovsky Selsoviet of Belogorsky District, Amur Oblast, Russia. The population was 60 as of 2018.

== Geography ==
The village is located 18 km south-west from Belogorsk.
