= Mogot =

Mogot Могот
- Settlement
- Location within Amur Oblast Location within Russia
- Coordinates: 55°36′N 124°55′E
- Country: Russia
- Region: Amur Oblast
- District: Tyndinsky District
- Time zone: UTC+9:00

Mogot (Russian: Могот) is a rural locality (a settlement) and the administrative center of Mogotsky Selsoviet of Tyndinsky District, Amur Oblast, Russia. The population was 632 as of 2018. There are 8 streets.

== Geography ==
Mogot is located on the Mogot River, 60 km north of Tynda (the district's administrative centre) by road. Bestuzhevo is the nearest rural locality.
