= Petrushi (station), Amur Oblast =

Petrushi Петруши
- Station
- Location within Amur Oblast Location within Russia
- Coordinates: 52°05′N 127°34′E
- Country: Russia
- Region: Amur Oblast
- District: Shimanovsky District
- Time zone: UTC+9:00

Petrushi (Russian: Петруши) is a rural locality (a station) in Petrushinsky Selsoviet of Shimanovsky District, Amur Oblast, Russia. The population was 31 as of 2018.

== Geography ==
It is located 11 km north-west from Shimanovsk.
