= Bereya =

Bereya Берея
- Station
- Location within Amur Oblast Location within Russia
- Coordinates: 52°09′N 127°28′E
- Country: Russia
- Region: Amur Oblast
- District: Shimanovsky District
- Time zone: UTC+9:00

Bereya (Russian: Берея) is a rural locality (a station) in Bereyinsky Selsoviet of Shimanovsky District, Amur Oblast, Russia. The population was 80 as of 2018.

== Geography ==
It is located 23 km north-west from Shimanovsk.
