= Vvedenovka =

Vvedenovka Введеновка
- Selo
- Location within Amur Oblast Location within Russia
- Coordinates: 51°18′N 128°12′E
- Country: Russia
- Region: Amur Oblast
- District: Seryshevsky District
- Time zone: UTC+9:00

Vvedenovka (Russian: Введеновка) is a rural locality (a selo) in Arginsky Selsoviet of Seryshevsky District, Amur Oblast, Russia. The population was 263 as of 2018. There are four streets.

== Geography ==
Vvedenovka is located on the Zeya River, 31 km north of Seryshevo (the district's administrative centre) by road. Arga is the nearest rural locality.
