= Bazisnoye =

Bazisnoye Базисное
- Selo
- Location within Amur Oblast Location within Russia
- Coordinates: 52°08′N 127°40′E
- Country: Russia
- Region: Amur Oblast
- District: Shimanovsky District
- Time zone: UTC+9:00

Bazisnoye (Russian: Базисное) is a rural locality (a selo) in Petrushinsky Selsoviet of Shimanovsky District, Amur Oblast, Russia. The population was 110 as of 2018. There are 3 streets.

== Geography ==
Bazisnoye is located 20 km north of Shimanovsk (the district's administrative centre) by road. Razdolnoye is the nearest rural locality.
