= Shiroky, Amur Oblast =

Shiroky Широкий
- Urban-type settlement
- Location within Amur Oblast Location within Russia
- Coordinates: 49°45′N 129°31′E
- Country: Russia
- Region: Amur Oblast
- District: Raychikhinsk urban okrug
- Time zone: UTC+9:00

Shiroky (Russian: Широкий) is a rural locality (an urban-type settlement) in Raychikhinsk urban okrug, Amur Oblast, Russia. The population was 1,225 as of 2018. There are 34 streets.

== Geography ==
The village is located in the valley of the Kholodny Klyuch River, 10 km from Raychikhinsk.
