= Bibliography of the Arctic =

The Arctic (/ˈɑːr(k)tɪk/; from Ancient Greek ἄρκτος (árktos) 'bear') is the polar region of Earth that surrounds the North Pole, lying north of the Arctic Circle. Travelling east from the IERS Reference Meridian, the Arctic region consists of parts of northern Norway (Nordland, Troms, Finnmark, Svalbard and Jan Mayen), northernmost Sweden (Västerbotten, Norrbotten and Lappland), northern Finland (North Ostrobothnia, Kainuu and Lappi), northern Russia (Murmansk, Siberia, Nenets Okrug and Novaya Zemlya), the United States (Alaska), Canada (Yukon, Northwest Territories and Nunavut), the Danish Realm (Greenland), and northern Iceland (Grímsey and Kolbeinsey), along with the Arctic Ocean and adjacent seas.

The Bibliography of the Arctic covers English-language scholarship on the Arctic and Arctic Ocean from prehistory to the present. It consists of the following sections:

- Bibliography of the human history of the Arctic
- Bibliography of the scientific history of the Arctic
- Bibliography of the history of Greenland
- Bibliography of the history of Iceland
- Bibliography of the history of Siberia
- Bibliography of the history of Canadian Arctic
- Bibliography of the history of Alaska
- Bibliography of the history of the Inuit
- List of arctic studies journals
