= Kositsino =

Kositsino Косицино
- Selo
- Location within Amur Oblast Location within Russia
- Coordinates: 50°03′N 128°01′E
- Country: Russia
- Region: Amur Oblast
- District: Tambovsky District
- Time zone: UTC+9:00

Kositsino (Russian: Косицино) is a rural locality (a selo) in Tambovsky Selsoviet of Tambovsky District, Amur Oblast, Russia. The population was 703 as of 2018. There are 9 streets.

== Geography ==
Kositsino is located on the Gilchin River, 5 km southwest of Tambovka (the district's administrative centre) by road. It is located in the very east of Russia, near the Chinese border. Kositsino is located in the Tambovsky district and the Amur Oblast.

Kositsino is connected to the rural localities ("Selo") Zharikovo and Svobodka by a southwest road.

== Population ==
The population level of Kositsino has stagnated at around 700, with minimal population growth.
