= Lipovka, Tambovsky District, Amur Oblast =

Lipovka Липовка
- Selo
- Location within Amur Oblast Location within Russia
- Coordinates: 50°12′N 128°10′E
- Country: Russia
- Region: Amur Oblast
- District: Tambovsky District
- Time zone: UTC+9:00

Lipovka (Russian: Липовка) is a rural locality (a selo) in Kozmodemyanovsky Selsoviet of Tambovsky District, Amur Oblast, Russia. The population was 131 as of 2018. There is 1 street.

== Geography ==
Lipovka is located 18 km northeast of Tambovka (the district's administrative centre) by road. Chuyevka is the nearest rural locality.
