= Dukhovskoye =

Dukhovskoye Духовское
- Selo
- Location within Amur Oblast Location within Russia
- Coordinates: 49°57′N 127°42′E
- Country: Russia
- Region: Amur Oblast
- District: Tambovsky District
- Time zone: UTC+9:00

Dukhovskoye (Russian: Духовское) is a rural locality (a selo) in Kuropatinsky Selsoviet of Tambovsky District, Amur Oblast, Russia. The population was 94 as of 2018. There are 3 streets.

== Geography ==
Dukhovskoye is located 40 km southwest of Tambovka (the district's administrative centre) by road. Kuropatino is the nearest rural locality.
