= Orletskoye =

Orletskoye Орлецкое
- Selo
- Location within Amur Oblast Location within Russia
- Coordinates: 50°12′N 128°05′E
- Country: Russia
- Region: Amur Oblast
- District: Tambovsky District
- Time zone: UTC+9:00

Orletskoye (Russian: Орлецкое) is a rural locality (a selo) in Sadovsky Selsoviet of Tambovsky District, Amur Oblast, Russia. The population was 212 as of 2018. There are 4 streets.

== Geography ==
Orletskoye is located 15 km north of Tambovka (the district's administrative centre) by road. Uspenovka is the nearest rural locality.
