= Pridorozhnoye =

Pridorozhnoye (Russian: Придорожное) is the name of several rural localities in Russia:

- Pridorozhnoye, Romnensky District, Amur Oblast, a selo in Chergalinsky Selsoviet of Romnensky District, Amur Oblast
- Pridorozhnoye, Tambovsky District, Amur Oblast, a selo in Tambovsky Selsoviet of Tambovsky District, Amur Oblast
- Pridorozhnoye, Chernyakhovsky District, Kaliningrad Oblast, a rural settlement in Chernyakhovsky District, Kaliningrad Oblast
