= Lazarevka =

Lazarevka (Russian: Ла́заревка) is the name of several inhabited localities in Russia:

Modern rural localities

- Lazarevka, Amur Oblast, a selo in Tambovsky District of Amur Oblast
- Lazarevka, Primorsky Krai, a selo in Yakovlevsky District of Primorsky Krai
- Lazarevka, name of several other rural localities

Historical names

- Lazarevka, in the 19th century, the name of the village of Lazarevskoye; since 1961—Lazarevskoye Microdistrict of Sochi
