= Limannoye =

Limannoye (Russian: Лиманное) is the name of several rural localities in Russia:

- Limannoye, Seryshevsky District, Amur Oblast, a selo in Limannovsky Selsoviet of Seryshevsky District, Amur Oblast
- Limannoye, Tambovsky District, Amur Oblast, a selo in Novoalexandrovsky Selsoviet of Tambovsky District, Amur Oblast
