= Pridorozhnoye, Tambovsky District, Amur Oblast =

Pridorozhnoye Придорожное
- Selo
- Location within Amur Oblast Location within Russia
- Coordinates: 50°03′N 128°10′E
- Country: Russia
- Region: Amur Oblast
- District: Tambovsky District
- Time zone: UTC+9:00

Pridorozhnoye (Russian: Придорожное) is a rural locality (a selo) in Tambovsky Selsoviet of Tambovsky District, Amur Oblast, Russia. The population was 523 as of 2018. There are 9 streets.

== Geography ==
Pridorozhnoye is located 13 km southeast of Tambovka (the district's administrative centre) by road. Tambovka is the nearest rural locality.
