= Svobodka =

Svobodka Свободка
- Selo
- Location within Amur Oblast Location within Russia
- Coordinates: 49°57′N 127°58′E
- Country: Russia
- Region: Amur Oblast
- District: Tambovsky District
- Time zone: UTC+9:00

Svobodka (Russian: Свободка) is a rural locality (a selo) in Zharikovsky Selsoviet of Tambovsky District, Amur Oblast, Russia. The population was 178 as of 2018. There are 3 streets.

== Geography ==
Svobodka is located on the Gilchin River, 19 km south of Tambovka (the district's administrative centre) by road. Zharikovo is the nearest rural locality.
