= Anatoly Derevyanko =

Soviet and Russian archaeologist

- Анатолий Деревянко
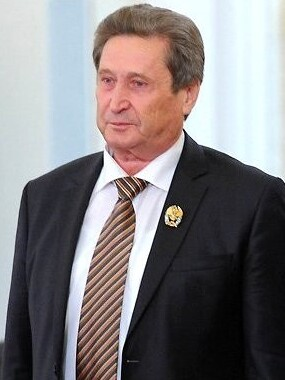
- Derevyanko in 2013
- Born: Anatoly Panteleyevich Derevyanko; 9 January 1943 (age 83); Kozmodemyanovka, Tambovsky District, Amur Oblast, RSFSR
- Education: Blagoveschensk State Pedagogical University
- Scientific career
- Fields: History, archaeology

Anatoly Panteleyevich Derevyanko (Russian: Анатолий Пантелеевич Деревянко; born 9 January 1943) is a Soviet and Russian archaeologist who specializes in the Stone Age of Siberia and the Russian Far East.

Anatoly was born in the workman's family. In 1963 he graduated from Blagoveshchensk State Pedagogical University (BSPU). Derevyanko was one of the youngest Doctors of Historical Sciences in the Soviet Union. He got a degree in 1971, being 28 years old, for his doctoral thesis "Amur River Region in Antiquity (B. C.)".

Anatoly Derevyanko is the prize-winner of several awards, such as State Prize of the Russian Federation (2001, 2012), The Demidov Prize (2004), The Lomonosov Gold Medal (2015).

Derevyanko has developed the new spatiotemporal version of initial ways of Asia's settlement, created a periodization, chronology and dynamics of Paleolith in the region. He is the head of program, which is dedicated to the compound research of Paleolithic spelaean monuments in South Siberia and Central Asia.

Anatoly Derevyanko was the chancellor of Novosibirsk State University for two years (1980–1982).
