= Zharikovo =

Zharikovo Жариково
- Selo
- Location within Amur Oblast Location within Russia
- Coordinates: 50°01′N 128°01′E
- Country: Russia
- Region: Amur Oblast
- District: Tambovsky District
- Time zone: UTC+9:00

Zharikovo (Russian: Жариково) is a rural locality (a selo) and the administrative center of Zharikovsky Selsoviet of Tambovsky District, Amur Oblast, Russia. The population was 610 as of 2018. There are 9 streets.

== Geography ==
Zharikovo is located on the Gilchin River, 11 km southwest of Tambovka (the district's administrative centre) by road. Kositsino is the nearest rural locality.
