= Kozmodemyanovka =

Kozmodemyanovka Козьмодемьяновка
- Selo
- Location within Amur Oblast Location within Russia
- Coordinates: 50°08′N 128°14′E
- Country: Russia
- Region: Amur Oblast
- District: Tambovsky District
- Time zone: UTC+9:00

Kozmodemyanovka (Russian: Козьмодемьяновка) is a rural locality (a selo) and the administrative center of Kozmodemyanovsky Selsoviet of Tambovsky District, Amur Oblast, Russia. The population was 1,482 as of 2018. There are 9 streets.

== Geography ==
Kozmodemyanovka is located on the Gilchin River, 18 km northeast of Tambovka (the district's administrative centre) by road. Chuyevka is the nearest rural locality.
