= Lazarevka, Amur Oblast =

Lazarevka Лазаревка
- Selo
- Location within Amur Oblast Location within Russia
- Coordinates: 50°13′N 128°20′E
- Country: Russia
- Region: Amur Oblast
- District: Tambovsky District
- Time zone: UTC+9:00

Lazarevka (Russian: Лазаревка) is a rural locality (a selo) in Lazarevsky Selsoviet of Tambovsky District, Amur Oblast, Russia. The population was 314 as of 2018. There are 5 streets.

== Geography ==
Lazarevka is located 29 km northeast of Tambovka (the district's administrative centre) by road. Kozmodemyanovka is the nearest rural locality.
