= Chuyevka =

Chuyevka Чуевка
- Selo
- Location within Amur Oblast Location within Russia
- Coordinates: 50°09′N 128°12′E
- Country: Russia
- Region: Amur Oblast
- District: Tambovsky District
- Time zone: UTC+9:00

Chuyevka (Russian: Чуевка) is a rural locality (a selo) in Kozmodemyanovsky Selsoviet of Tambovsky District, Amur Oblast, Russia. The population was 178 as of 2018. There are 2 streets.

== Geography ==
Chuyevka is located 13 km northeast of Tambovka (the district's administrative centre) by road. Kozmodemyanovka is the nearest rural locality.
