= Limannoye, Tambovsky District, Amur Oblast =

Limannoye Лиманное
- Selo
- Location within Amur Oblast Location within Russia
- Coordinates: 50°03′N 128°18′E
- Country: Russia
- Region: Amur Oblast
- District: Tambovsky District
- Time zone: UTC+9:00

Limannoye (Russian: Лиманное) is a rural locality (a selo) in Novoalexandrovsky Selsoviet of Tambovsky District, Amur Oblast, Russia. The population was 153 as of 2018. There are 4 streets.

== Geography ==
Limannoye is located 28 km southeast of Tambovka (the district's administrative centre) by road. Novoalexandrovka is the nearest rural locality.
