= List of arctic studies journals =

Academic journals about the Arctic

Arctic studies journals
- The Arctic region
- Subject: Arctic
- Scope: Peer-reviewed academic journals
- Language: English

This is a list of notable and independent English language peer-reviewed academic journals related to the study of the Arctic.

The Arctic (/ˈɑːr(k)tɪk/; from Ancient Greek ἄρκτος (árktos) 'bear') is the polar region of Earth that surrounds the North Pole, lying north of the Arctic Circle. Travelling east from the IERS Reference Meridian, the Arctic region consists of parts of northern Norway (Nordland, Troms, Finnmark, Svalbard and Jan Mayen), northernmost Sweden (Västerbotten, Norrbotten and Lappland), northern Finland (North Ostrobothnia, Kainuu and Lappi), northern Russia (Murmansk, Siberia, Nenets Okrug and Novaya Zemlya), the United States (Alaska), Canada (Yukon, Northwest Territories and Nunavut), the Danish Realm (Greenland), and northern Iceland (Grímsey and Kolbeinsey), along with the Arctic Ocean and adjacent seas.

Subject regions and peoples covered include:

- North America: Alaska, Yukon, the Northwest Territories, Nunavut, Nunavik, and Nunatsiavut.
- Greenland and the North Atlantic: Iceland, the Faroe Islands, Svalbard, and Jan Mayen.
- Northern Fennoscandia: Sápmi and the northern regions of Norway, Sweden, and Finland.
- The Russian Arctic and Siberia.
- Peoples: Inuit, Yupik, Aleuts, Sámi, Nenets, Chukchi, Evenks, and the other circumpolar peoples.

Journals should be published by major universities, professional associations, polar research institutes, or notable independent academic publishers. Periodicals published by non-academic government entities should not be included. Journal entries should have references to journal databases (Note: e.g. JSTOR, Project Muse.) and/or the publisher website to demonstrate they meet inclusion requirements. Journals previously published under a different name or by a different publisher should be footnoted. Journals that publish in a language other than English alongside English are noted in the entry.

== General studies ==
Journals here are multidisciplinary and primarily but not exclusively related to the Arctic; several cover both polar regions.

- Acta Borealia (1984–present); published twice a year by Taylor & Francis and edited by a group of scholars at the University of Tromsø; ISSN 0800-3831 (print), ISSN 1503-111X (online).
- Arctic (1948–present); published quarterly by the Arctic Institute of North America, University of Calgary; ISSN 0004-0843 (print), ISSN 1923-1245 (online). (Note: Online only since 2020.)
- Journal of Northern Studies (2007–present); published by Umeå University in collaboration with the Royal Skyttean Society; ISSN 1654-5915 (print), ISSN 2004-4658 (online). (Note: Open access since 2017.)
- The Polar Journal (2011–present); published by Taylor & Francis; ISSN 2154-896X (print), ISSN 2154-8978 (online).
- Polar Record (1931–present); published by Cambridge University Press for the Scott Polar Research Institute; ISSN 0032-2474 (print), ISSN 1475-3057 (online).
- Polar Research (1982–present); published by the Norwegian Polar Institute; ISSN 0800-0395 (print, 1982–2010), ISSN 1751-8369 (online). (Note: Open access since the first issue in 1982.)
- Polar Science (2007–present); published quarterly by Elsevier on behalf of the National Institute of Polar Research (Japan); ISSN 1873-9652 (print), ISSN 1876-4428 (online).

== Regional studies ==
=== North America ===
- Alaska Journal of Anthropology (2001–present); published by the Alaska Anthropological Association; ISSN 1544-9793 (print).
- The Northern Review (1988–present); published by Yukon University; (Note: Published by Yukon College before it became Yukon University. Publication was suspended from 2002 to 2005.) ISSN 0835-3433 (print), ISSN 1929-6657 (online).

=== Greenland and the North Atlantic ===
- Journal of the North Atlantic (2008–present); published online by the Eagle Hill Institute, Steuben, Maine; ISSN 1935-1933 (online).
- Meddelelser om Grønland (Monographs on Greenland) (1879–present); published by the Commission for Scientific Research in Greenland / Danish Polar Center and, since 2008, by Museum Tusculanum Press, Copenhagen; ISSN 0025-6676. (Note: In 1979, after volume 206, the series was divided into three subseries: Bioscience (ISSN 0106-1054), Geoscience (ISSN 0106-1046), and Man & Society (ISSN 0106-1062). Since 2008 the original numbering has continued alongside the subseries numbering.)

=== Russian Arctic and Siberia ===
- Arctic and North (Арктика и Север, Arktika i Sever) (2011–present); published online by the Northern (Arctic) Federal University, Arkhangelsk; Russian and English; ISSN 2221-2698.
- Sibirica: Interdisciplinary Journal of Siberian Studies (1983–present); published three times a year by Berghahn Books; ISSN 1361-7362 (print), ISSN 1476-6787 (online). (Note: Began as an occasional publication of papers from the British Universities Siberian Studies Seminar (1983–1989); published as Siberica: A Journal of North Pacific Studies (1990) and Sibirica: The Journal of Siberian Studies (from 1993) by several publishers, including Routledge from 2002; published by Berghahn under the present subtitle since 2006.)

== Peoples ==
=== Inuit ===
- Études Inuit Studies (1977–present); published twice a year by the Centre interuniversitaire d'études et de recherches autochtones (CIÉRA), Université Laval; (Note: Founded by the Association Inuksiutiit Katimajiit in 1977 as Études/Inuit/Studies; renamed Études Inuit Studies in 2018.) French and English; ISSN 0701-1008 (print), ISSN 1708-5268 (online).

== Topical ==
Journals here focus on a single discipline or subject within Arctic studies.

=== Anthropology and archaeology ===
- Arctic Anthropology (1962–present); published twice a year by the University of Wisconsin Press; (Note: Founded by Chester S. Chard, who supported the journal until the University of Wisconsin Press took over production in 1965.) ISSN 0066-6939 (print), ISSN 1933-8139 (online).

=== Health ===
- International Journal of Circumpolar Health (1997–present); published by Taylor & Francis for the Circumpolar Health Research Network; ISSN 1239-9736 (print, 1997–2011), ISSN 2242-3982 (online). (Note: Established in 1973 as an organ of the Nordiska Samarbetskommitten för Arktisk Medicinsk Forskning; published as Arctic Medical Research until 1997. Online only since 2012.)

=== Law, politics, and security ===
- Arctic Review on Law and Politics (2010–present); published by Brill; ISSN 1891-6252 (print), ISSN 2387-4562 (online). (Note: Published open access by Cappelen Damm Forskning from 2015 until the journal moved to Brill in 2025.)
- Arctic Yearbook (2012–present); published annually by the University of the Arctic Thematic Network on Geopolitics and Security together with the Northern Research Forum; open access; ISSN 2298-2418.
- The Yearbook of Polar Law (2009–present); published annually by Brill (Martinus Nijhoff) and based at the University of Akureyri; ISSN 1876-8814 (print), ISSN 2211-6427 (online).

=== Geography ===
- Polar Geography (1977–present); published by Taylor & Francis; ISSN 1088-937X (print), ISSN 1939-0513 (online). (Note: Published as Polar Geography and Geology (1980–1994). Established in 1977 with startup funds from the National Science Foundation.)

=== Natural sciences ===
- Arctic Science (2015–present); published by Canadian Science Publishing; open access; ISSN 2368-7460 (online).
- Polar Biology (1982–present); published by Springer; ISSN 0722-4060 (print), ISSN 1432-2056 (online).
- Rangifer (1981–present); published by the Swedish University of Agricultural Sciences on the Septentrio platform of UiT The Arctic University of Norway; ISSN 0333-256X (print, 1981–2007), ISSN 1890-6729 (online). (Note: Published by the Nordic Council for Reindeer Husbandry Research until 2012. Online only and open access since 2008.)

== Related fields and topics ==
This section contains journals that are not primarily about the Arctic but have significant coverage of it.

- Anthropology & Archeology of Eurasia (1992–2022); published quarterly by Taylor & Francis; ISSN 1061-1959 (print), ISSN 1558-092X (online). (Note: Published as Soviet Anthropology and Archeology before 1992. Ceased publication in 2022.)
- Archaeology, Ethnology & Anthropology of Eurasia (2000–present); published quarterly by the Institute of Archaeology and Ethnography, Siberian Branch of the Russian Academy of Sciences, Novosibirsk; Russian and English; ISSN 1563-0110 (print), ISSN 1531-832X (online).
- Arctic, Antarctic, and Alpine Research (1969–present); published by Taylor & Francis for the Institute of Arctic and Alpine Research, University of Colorado Boulder; ISSN 1523-0430 (print), ISSN 1938-4246 (online). (Note: Published as Arctic and Alpine Research (1969–1998).)
- Eurasian Geography and Economics (1960–present); published by Taylor & Francis; ISSN 1538-7216 (print), ISSN 1938-2863 (online). (Note: Published as Soviet Geography (1960–1991), Post-Soviet Geography (1992–1995), and Post-Soviet Geography and Economics (1996–2002).)
- Journal of Russian American Studies (2017–present); published online twice a year by the University of Kansas Libraries; open access; English and Russian; ISSN 2473-7348 (online).
- Nomadic Peoples (1979–present); published twice a year by the White Horse Press for the Commission on Nomadic Peoples, International Union of Anthropological and Ethnological Sciences; ISSN 0822-7942 (print), ISSN 1752-2366 (online).
- Pacific Historical Review (1932–present); published quarterly by the University of California Press for the Pacific Coast Branch of the American Historical Association; ISSN 0030-8684 (print), ISSN 1533-8584 (online).
- Permafrost and Periglacial Processes (1990–present); published by Wiley; ISSN 1045-6740 (print), ISSN 1099-1530 (online).

== See also ==
- Bibliography of the human history of the Arctic
- Bibliography of the scientific history of the Arctic
- Bibliography of Greenland
- Bibliography of the Canadian Arctic
- Bibliography of the history of Alaska
- Bibliography of Siberia
- Circumpolar peoples
