= Archaeology, Ethnology & Anthropology of Eurasia =

Academic journal

- Discipline: Anthropology, Archaeology
- Language: English, Russian
- Edited by: Anatoly Pantelyevich Derevyanko

Publication details
- History: 2000–present
- Publisher: Elsevier on behalf of the Siberian Branch of the Russian Academy of Sciences
- Frequency: Quarterly
- Open access: Delayed, after 1 year

Standard abbreviations
- ISO 4: Archaeol. Ethnol. Anthropol. Eurasia

Indexing
- ISSN: 1563-0110 (print); 1531-832X (web)
- LCCN: 2005236029
- Russian
- ISSN: 1563-0102

Links
- Journal homepage; Online archives

Archaeology, Ethnology & Anthropology of Eurasia (Russian: Археология, Этнография и Антропология Евразии) is a bilingual peer-reviewed academic journal covering anthropological and archaeological studies on Eurasia. It was established in 2000 by the Institute of Archaeology and Ethnography of Siberian Branch of the Russian Academy of Sciences. Since January 2008, the institute publishes it in association with Elsevier.

== Abstracting and indexing ==
The journal is abstracted and indexed in:

- Anthropological Literature
- Art Source
- EBSCO databases (Academic Search, Historical Abstracts)
- Emerging Sources Citation Index
- ERIH PLUS
- Index Islamicus
- Russian Science Citation Index
- Scopus

== Editor-in-chief ==
Since its establishment, Anatoly Pantelyevich Derevyanko is the editor-in-chief of the journal.
