= Limannoye, Seryshevsky District, Amur Oblast =

Limannoye Лиманное
- Selo
- Location within Amur Oblast Location within Russia
- Coordinates: 51°15′N 128°50′E
- Country: Russia
- Region: Amur Oblast
- District: Seryshevsky District
- Time zone: UTC+9:00

Limannoye (Russian: Лиманное) is a rural locality (a selo) and the administrative center of Limannovsky Selsoviet of Seryshevsky District, Amur Oblast, Russia. The population was 241 as of 2018. There are 5 streets.

== Geography ==
Limannoye is located 40 km northeast of Seryshevo (the district's administrative centre) by road. Vernoye is the nearest rural locality.
