= Bibliography of the history of the Canadian Arctic =

Bibliography of the Canadian Arctic
- Canadian Arctic
- Subject: Northern Canada
- Scope: Books, journal articles, book chapters
- Period covered: Prehistory to the present
- Languages: English
- Related: Inuit; Northern Canada; Northwest Passage; Northwest Territories; Nunavut; Yukon

This is a select bibliography of academic level books and journal articles about the Canadian Arctic and Northern Canada: its history, peoples, languages, geography and environment. The bibliography runs from the prehistory of the Dorset and Thule people through European exploration and the search for the Northwest Passage, the fur trade and whaling, the Klondike Gold Rush, the Second World War and the Cold War, and the creation of Nunavut, to the present. It covers the Inuit and Dene, Arctic sovereignty, government policy and relocation, and economic development.

Northern Canada, also called the North or the Territories, is the northernmost region of Canada, defined variously by geography and politics. Politically the term refers to the three territories of Canada: Yukon, the Northwest Territories and Nunavut. The region covers a large part of Canada's land area but holds a small share of its population.

Bibliography contains academic level English language books (including translations) and journal articles, published mainly post World War II. (Note: Works published before World War II should be limited to areas where there are no significant post-World War II books on the subject or when the work in question has significant historical merit.) Book entries may have references to reviews published in academic journals or major newspapers and magazines when these could be considered helpful. These reference reviews also function as a resource to find other works on this subject.

Works listed here are cited in the notes or bibliographies of scholarly sources. Each is published by an academic or major trade press, written by a recognized expert, or substantially reviewed in scholarly journals; borderline cases are omitted. A selection of primary sources is included. Many of the books below carry their own bibliographies; see Further reading section for longer ones, and External links section for museums, library collections and academic programs.

Citations follow APA style. (Note: Entries are in plain text APA 7 format; templates are used only for identifiers, reviews and notes.) Books have citations to academic journal or mainstream published reviews when available. For books only partly about the subject, give relevant chapter or section titles where useful and available. Translators of the original-language edition are included when possible, and a footnote gives the original-language edition.

== General works ==
- Abel, K., & Coates, K. S. (Eds.). (2001). Northern visions: New perspectives on the north in Canadian history. Broadview Press. doi:10.3138/9781442602779
- Bone, R. M. (2016). The Canadian north: Issues and challenges (5th ed.). Oxford University Press.
- Grace, S. E. (2002). Canada and the idea of north. McGill-Queen's University Press. doi:10.1515/9780773569539
- Hamelin, L.-E. (1979). Canadian nordicity: It's your north, too (W. Barr, Trans.). Harvest House. (Note: Originally published in French as Nordicité canadienne (1975).)
- McGhee, R. (2005). The last imaginary place: A human history of the Arctic world. Oxford University Press. doi:10.1093/oso/9780192807304.001.0001
- Rea, K. J. (1968). The political economy of the Canadian north: An interpretation of the course of development in the northern territories of Canada to the early 1960's. University of Toronto Press. doi:10.3138/9781487574659
- Zaslow, M. (1971). The opening of the Canadian north, 1870–1914. McClelland and Stewart.
- Zaslow, M. (1988). The northward expansion of Canada, 1914–1967. McClelland and Stewart.

== Archaeology and prehistory ==
- Friesen, T. M., & Arnold, C. D. (2008). The timing of the Thule migration: New dates from the western Canadian Arctic. American Antiquity, 73(3), 527–538. doi:10.1017/S0002731600046850
- Friesen, T. M., & Mason, O. K. (Eds.). (2016). The Oxford handbook of the prehistoric Arctic. Oxford University Press. doi:10.1093/oxfordhb/9780199766956.001.0001
- Maxwell, M. S. (1985). Prehistory of the eastern Arctic. Academic Press.
- McGhee, R. (1996). Ancient people of the Arctic. UBC Press.
- Raghavan, M., DeGiorgio, M., Albrechtsen, A., Moltke, I., Skoglund, P., Korneliussen, T. S., Grønnow, B., Appelt, M., Gulløv, H. C., Friesen, T. M., Fitzhugh, W., Malmström, H., Rasmussen, S., Olsen, J., Melchior, L., Fuller, B. T., Fahrni, S. M., Stafford, T., Jr., Grimes, V., . . . Willerslev, E. (2014). The genetic prehistory of the New World Arctic. Science, 345(6200). doi:10.1126/science.1255832
- Schledermann, P., & McCullough, K. M. (1980). Western elements in the early Thule culture of the eastern High Arctic. Arctic, 33(4), 833. doi:10.14430/arctic2599

== History ==
=== Exploration and the Northwest Passage ===
- Beattie, O., & Geiger, J. (1987). Frozen in time: The fate of the Franklin expedition. Bloomsbury.
- Berton, P. (1988). The Arctic grail: The quest for the North West Passage and the North Pole, 1818–1909. Viking.
- Cavell, J. (2018). Who discovered the Northwest Passage? Arctic, 71(3). doi:10.14430/arctic4733
- Craciun, A. (2016). Writing Arctic disaster: Authorship and exploration. Cambridge University Press. doi:10.1017/cbo9781316410790
- Cyriax, R. J. (1939). Sir John Franklin's last Arctic expedition: A chapter in the history of the Royal Navy. Methuen.
- Levere, T. H. (1993). Science and the Canadian Arctic: A century of exploration, 1818–1918. Cambridge University Press.
- Potter, R. A. (2007). Arctic spectacles: The frozen north in visual culture, 1818–1875. University of Washington Press.
- Williams, G. (2010). Arctic labyrinth: The quest for the Northwest Passage. University of California Press.
- Woodman, D. C. (1991). Unravelling the Franklin mystery: Inuit testimony. McGill-Queen's University Press. doi:10.1515/9780773562899

=== Fur trade and whaling ===
- Barr, W. (1994). The eighteenth century trade between the ships of the Hudson's Bay Company and the Hudson Strait Inuit. Arctic, 47(3). doi:10.14430/arctic1294
- Bockstoce, J. R. (1986). Whales, ice, and men: The history of whaling in the western Arctic. University of Washington Press.
- Eber, D. H. (1989). When the whalers were up north: Inuit memories from the eastern Arctic. McGill-Queen's University Press. doi:10.1515/9780773562042
- Ray, A. J. (1990). The Canadian fur trade in the industrial age. University of Toronto Press. doi:10.3138/9781442657403
- Ross, W. G. (Ed.). (1985). Arctic whalers, icy seas: Narratives of the Davis Strait whale fishery. Irwin Publishing.
- Usher, P. J. (1971). Fur trade posts of the Northwest Territories, 1870–1970. Department of Indian Affairs and Northern Development.

=== The Klondike and the Yukon ===
- Berton, P. (1958). The Klondike fever: The life and death of the last great gold rush. Knopf.
- Coates, K. S. (1991). Best left as Indians: Native-white relations in the Yukon Territory, 1840–1973. McGill-Queen's University Press. doi:10.1515/9780773562615
- Coates, K. S., & Morrison, W. R. (1988). Land of the midnight sun: A history of the Yukon. Hurtig.
- Morse, K. (2003). The nature of gold: An environmental history of the Klondike gold rush. University of Washington Press. doi:10.1515/9780295989877
- Porsild, C. (1998). Gamblers and dreamers: Women, men, and community in the Klondike. UBC Press. doi:10.59962/9780774854559

=== Sovereignty and government ===
- Byers, M. (2013). International law and the Arctic. Cambridge University Press. doi:10.1017/cbo9781107337442
- Cavell, J. (2010). 'A little more latitude': Explorers, politicians, and Canadian Arctic policy during the Laurier era. Polar Record, 47(4), 289–309. doi:10.1017/s0032247410000537
- Cavell, J., & Noakes, J. (2010). Acts of occupation: Canada and Arctic sovereignty, 1918–25. UBC Press. doi:10.59962/9780774818698
- Coates, K. S., Lackenbauer, P. W., Morrison, W. R., & Poelzer, G. (2008). Arctic front: Defending Canada in the far north. Thomas Allen.
- Elliot-Meisel, E. B. (1998). Arctic diplomacy: Canada and the United States in the Northwest Passage. Peter Lang.
- Grant, S. D. (1988). Sovereignty or security? Government policy in the Canadian North, 1936–1950. UBC Press. doi:10.59962/9780774854030
- Grant, S. D. (2002). Arctic justice: On trial for murder, Pond Inlet, 1923. McGill-Queen's University Press. doi:10.1515/9780773570030
- Grant, S. D. (2010). Polar imperative: A history of Arctic sovereignty in North America. Douglas & McIntyre.
- Griffiths, F., Huebert, R., & Lackenbauer, P. W. (2011). Canada and the changing Arctic: Sovereignty, security, and stewardship. Wilfrid Laurier University Press. doi:10.51644/9781554584130
- Huebert, R. (1995). Polar vision or tunnel vision: The making of Canadian Arctic waters policy. Marine Policy, 19(4), 343–363. doi:10.1016/0308-597X(95)00011-T
- Huebert, R. (1999). Canadian Arctic security issues: Transformation in the post-Cold War era. International Journal, 54(2), 203. JSTOR 40203373
- Huebert, R. (2003). The shipping news part II: How Canada's Arctic sovereignty is on thinning ice. International Journal, 58(3), 295. JSTOR 40203861
- Morrison, W. R. (1985). Showing the flag: The Mounted Police and Canadian sovereignty in the North, 1894–1925. UBC Press. doi:10.59962/9780774857536
- Pharand, D. (1988). Canada's Arctic waters in international law. Cambridge University Press. doi:10.1017/cbo9780511565458

=== World War II and the Cold War ===
- Coates, K. S., & Morrison, W. R. (1992). The Alaska Highway in World War II: The U.S. Army of occupation in Canada's Northwest. University of Toronto Press.
- Hird, M. (2016). The DEW Line and Canada's Arctic waste: Legacy and futurity. The Northern Review, (42), 23–45. doi:10.22584/nr42.2016.003
- Kikkert, P., & Lackenbauer, P. W. (2020). "On hallowed ground": St. Roch, sovereignty, and the 1944 Northwest Passage transit. The Northern Mariner, 29(3), 213–232. doi:10.25071/2561-5467.212
- Lackenbauer, P. W. (2013). The Canadian Rangers: A living history. UBC Press. doi:10.59962/9780774824545
- Lackenbauer, P. W. (2020). Tolerant allies: The Joint Arctic Weather Stations, Canadianization, and Canada–United States relations in the Cold War Arctic. International Journal, 75(4), 487–502. doi:10.1177/0020702020977352
- Lackenbauer, P. W., & Farish, M. (2007). The Cold War on Canadian soil: Militarizing a northern environment. Environmental History, 12(4), 920–950. doi:10.1093/envhis/12.4.920
- Trudgen, M. (2015). Coping with fallout: The influence of radioactive fallout on Canadian decision-making on the Distant Early Warning (DEW) Line. International Journal, 70(2), 232–249. doi:10.1177/0020702015573521

=== Relocation and government policy ===
- Damas, D. (2002). Arctic migrants/Arctic villagers: The transformation of Inuit settlement in the central Arctic. McGill-Queen's University Press. doi:10.1515/9780773570412
- Kulchyski, P., & Tester, F. J. (2007). Kiumajut (talking back): Game management and Inuit rights, 1900–70. UBC Press. doi:10.59962/9780774855525

=== Nunavut and northern self-government ===
- Campbell, A., Fenge, T., & Hanson, U. (2011). Implementing the 1993 Nunavut Land Claims Agreement. Arctic Review on Law and Politics, 2(1), 25–51. doi:10.23865/arctic.v2.17
- Dacks, G. (1981). A choice of futures: Politics in the Canadian north. Methuen.
- Dickerson, M. O. (1992). Whose north? Political change, political development, and self-government in the Northwest Territories. UBC Press. doi:10.59962/9780774853811
- Henderson, A. (2007). Nunavut: Rethinking political culture. UBC Press. doi:10.59962/9780774855655
- Hicks, J., & White, G. (2015). Made in Nunavut: An experiment in decentralized government. UBC Press. doi:10.59962/9780774831055
- Kulchyski, P. (2005). Like the sound of a drum: Aboriginal cultural politics in Denendeh and Nunavut. University of Manitoba Press. doi:10.1515/9780887553356
- Mitchell, M. (1996). From talking chiefs to a native corporate elite: The birth of class and nationalism among Canadian Inuit. McGill-Queen's University Press. JSTOR j.ctt806bn
- Weller, G. R. (1988). Self-government for Canada's Inuit: The Nunavut proposal. American Review of Canadian Studies, 18(3), 341–358. doi:10.1080/02722018809480936

== Ethnography ==
=== General and comparative works ===
- Fossett, R. (2001). In order to live untroubled: Inuit of the central Arctic, 1550 to 1940. University of Manitoba Press. doi:10.1515/9780887553288
- Laugrand, F. B., & Oosten, J. G. (2010). Inuit shamanism and Christianity: Transitions and transformations in the twentieth century. McGill-Queen's University Press. doi:10.1515/9780773576360
- Stern, P., & Stevenson, L. (Eds.). (2006). Critical Inuit studies: An anthology of contemporary Arctic ethnography. University of Nebraska Press.

=== Inuit ===
- Alunik, I., Kolausok, E. D., & Morrison, D. (2003). Across time and tundra: The Inuvialuit of the western Arctic. Raincoast Books.
- Briggs, J. L. (1970). Never in anger: Portrait of an Eskimo family. Harvard University Press.
- Briggs, J. L. (1998). Inuit morality play: The emotional education of a three-year-old. Yale University Press.
- Condon, R. G. (1987). Inuit youth: Growth and change in the Canadian Arctic. Rutgers University Press.
- Condon, R. G., Ogina, J., & the Holman Elders. (1996). The northern Copper Inuit: A history. University of Toronto Press.
- Dorais, L.-J. (1997). Quaqtaq: Modernity and identity in an Inuit community. University of Toronto Press. doi:10.3138/9781442678934
- Graburn, N. H. H. (1969). Eskimos without igloos: Social and economic development in Sugluk. Little, Brown.
- Harder, M. T., & Wenzel, G. W. (2012). Inuit subsistence, social economy and food security in Clyde River, Nunavut. Arctic, 65(3). doi:10.14430/arctic4218
- Jenness, D. (1922). The life of the Copper Eskimos (Report of the Canadian Arctic Expedition, 1913–18, Vol. 12). King's Printer.
- Markham, N. (2021). "Murmuring against God": Inuit–Moravian confrontations in late nineteenth-century Labrador. Newfoundland and Labrador Studies, 36(1), 87–115. doi:10.7202/1082214ar
- Matthiasson, J. S. (1992). Living on the land: Change among the Inuit of Baffin Island. Broadview Press.
- Rasmussen, K. (1929). Intellectual culture of the Iglulik Eskimos (W. Worster, Trans.; Report of the Fifth Thule Expedition, 1921–24, Vol. 7, No. 1). Gyldendal.
- Rollmann, H. J. (2010). Moravians in central Labrador: The indigenous Inuit mission of Jacobus and Salome at Snooks Cove. Journal of Moravian History, 9(1), 6–40. JSTOR 41179879
- Stevenson, M. G. (1997). Inuit, whalers, and cultural persistence: Structure in Cumberland Sound and central Inuit social organization. Oxford University Press.
- Wenzel, G. (1991). Animal rights, human rights: Ecology, economy and ideology in the Canadian Arctic. University of Toronto Press. doi:10.3138/9781442670877
- Wenzel, G. W. (2011). Polar bear management, sport hunting and Inuit subsistence at Clyde River, Nunavut. Marine Policy, 35(4), 457–465. doi:10.1016/j.marpol.2010.10.020

=== Dene and Yukon First Nations ===
- Abel, K. (1993). Drum songs: Glimpses of Dene history. McGill-Queen's University Press. doi:10.1515/9780773563896
- Cruikshank, J. (2005). Do glaciers listen? Local knowledge, colonial encounters, and social imagination. UBC Press. doi:10.59962/9780774851404
- Fumoleau, R. (2004). As long as this land shall last: A history of Treaty 8 and Treaty 11, 1870–1939. University of Calgary Press. JSTOR j.ctv6gqrx6 (Original work published 1975)
- Helm, J. (2000). The people of Denendeh: Ethnohistory of the Indians of Canada's Northwest Territories. McGill-Queen's University Press. JSTOR j.ctt130hb9m
- Legat, A. (2012). Walking the land, feeding the fire: Knowledge and stewardship among the Tłı̨chǫ Dene. University of Arizona Press.
- Nadasdy, P. (2003). Hunters and bureaucrats: Power, knowledge, and aboriginal-state relations in the southwest Yukon. UBC Press. doi:10.59962/9780774851886
- Nadasdy, P. (2017). Sovereignty's entailments: First Nation state formation in the Yukon. University of Toronto Press. doi:10.3138/9781487515720
- Slobodin, R. (1962). Band organization of the Peel River Kutchin (National Museum of Canada Bulletin 179). National Museum of Canada.

== Ethnic cleansing and racial violence ==
- Bussidor, I., & Bilgen-Reinart, Ü. (1997). Night spirits: The story of the relocation of the Sayisi Dene. University of Manitoba Press. doi:10.1515/9780887553486
- Goldring, P. (2015). Historians and Inuit: Learning from the Qikiqtani Truth Commission, 2007–2010. Canadian Journal of History, 50(3), 492–523. doi:10.3138/cjh.ach.50.3.005
- Grygier, P. S. (1994). A long way from home: The tuberculosis epidemic among the Inuit. McGill-Queen's University Press. doi:10.1515/9780773564855
- Marcus, A. R. (1991). Out in the cold: Canada's experimental Inuit relocation to Grise Fiord and Resolute Bay. Polar Record, 27(163), 285–296. doi:10.1017/S0032247400013048
- Marcus, A. R. (1995). Relocating Eden: The image and politics of Inuit exile in the Canadian Arctic. University Press of New England.
- Tester, F. J. (2010). Mad dogs and (mostly) Englishmen: Colonial relations, commodities, and the fate of Inuit sled dogs. Études/Inuit/Studies, 34(2), 129–147. doi:10.7202/1004073ar
- Tester, F. J., & Kulchyski, P. (1994). Tammarniit (mistakes): Inuit relocation in the eastern Arctic, 1939–63. UBC Press. doi:10.59962/9780774854795
- Truth and Reconciliation Commission of Canada. (2015). Canada's residential schools: The Inuit and Northern experience (The final report of the Truth and Reconciliation Commission of Canada, Vol. 2). McGill-Queen's University Press. JSTOR j.ctt19rm9tm

== Topical ==
=== Languages ===
- Dorais, L.-J. (2010). The language of the Inuit: Syntax, semantics, and society in the Arctic. McGill-Queen's University Press. doi:10.1515/9780773581623
- Fortescue, M., Jacobson, S., & Kaplan, L. (2010). Comparative Eskimo dictionary with Aleut cognates (2nd ed.). Alaska Native Language Center.
- Rice, K. (1989). A grammar of Slave. Mouton de Gruyter. doi:10.1515/9783110861822

=== Geography and environment ===
- Cameron, E. (2015). Far off metal river: Inuit lands, settler stories, and the making of the contemporary Arctic. UBC Press. doi:10.59962/9780774828864
- Ford, J. D., Smit, B., & Wandel, J. (2006). Vulnerability to climate change in the Arctic: A case study from Arctic Bay, Canada. Global Environmental Change, 16(2), 145–160. doi:10.1016/j.gloenvcha.2005.11.007
- French, H. M., & Slaymaker, O. (Eds.). (1993). Canada's cold environments. McGill-Queen's University Press. doi:10.1515/9780773563544
- Gardner, A. S., Moholdt, G., Wouters, B., Wolken, G. J., Burgess, D. O., Sharp, M. J., Cogley, J. G., Braun, C., & Labine, C. (2011). Sharply increased mass loss from glaciers and ice caps in the Canadian Arctic Archipelago. Nature, 473(7347), 357–360. doi:10.1038/nature10089
- Gombay, N. (2019). Wildlife management in Nunavik: Structures, operations, and perceptions following the James Bay and Northern Quebec Agreement. Arctic, 72(2), 181–196. doi:10.14430/arctic68287
- Mueller, D. R., Vincent, W. F., & Jeffries, M. O. (2003). Break-up of the largest Arctic ice shelf and associated loss of an epishelf lake. Geophysical Research Letters, 30(20). doi:10.1029/2003GL017931
- Piper, L., & Sandlos, J. (2007). A broken frontier: Ecological imperialism in the Canadian north. Environmental History, 12(4), 759–795. doi:10.1093/envhis/12.4.759
- Sandlos, J. (2007). Hunters at the margin: Native people and wildlife conservation in the Northwest Territories. UBC Press. doi:10.59962/9780774855884
- Smol, J. P., & Douglas, M. S. V. (2007). Crossing the final ecological threshold in high Arctic ponds. Proceedings of the National Academy of Sciences, 104(30), 12395–12397. doi:10.1073/pnas.0702777104
- Stuhl, A. (2016). Unfreezing the Arctic: Science, colonialism, and the transformation of Inuit lands. University of Chicago Press. doi:10.7208/chicago/9780226416786.001.0001
- Watt-Cloutier, S. (2018). The right to be cold: One woman's story of protecting her culture, the Arctic and the whole planet. University of Minnesota Press. doi:10.5749/j.ctt2204r9f (Original work published 2015)
- Wright, S. (2014). Our ice is vanishing / Sikuvut nunguliqtuq: A history of Inuit, newcomers, and climate change. McGill-Queen's University Press. doi:10.1515/9780773596108

=== Economic development ===
- Lasserre, F., & Pelletier, S. (2011). Polar super seaways? Maritime transport in the Arctic: An analysis of shipowners' intentions. Journal of Transport Geography, 19(6), 1465–1473. doi:10.1016/j.jtrangeo.2011.08.006
- Page, R. (1986). Northern development: The Canadian dilemma. McClelland and Stewart.
- Piper, L. (2009). The industrial transformation of subarctic Canada. UBC Press. doi:10.59962/9780774815345
- Prowse, T. D., Furgal, C., Chouinard, R., Melling, H., Milburn, D., & Smith, S. L. (2009). Implications of climate change for economic development in northern Canada: Energy, resource, and transportation sectors. Ambio, 38(5), 272–281. doi:10.1579/0044-7447-38.5.272

=== Mining ===
==== Gold and silver ====
- Gates, M. (1994). Gold at Fortymile Creek: Early days in the Yukon. UBC Press. doi:10.59962/9780774853941
- Sandlos, J., & Keeling, A. (2025). The price of gold: Mining, pollution, and resistance in Yellowknife. McGill-Queen's University Press. doi:10.1515/9780228026181

==== Rare earths and critical minerals ====
- Pinckston, D. R., & Smith, D. G. W. (1995). Mineralogy of the Lake zone, Thor Lake rare-metals deposit, N.W.T., Canada. Canadian Journal of Earth Sciences, 32(4), 516–532. doi:10.1139/e95-044
- Sheard, E. R., Williams-Jones, A. E., Heiligmann, M., Pederson, C., & Trueman, D. L. (2012). Controls on the concentration of zirconium, niobium, and the rare earth elements in the Thor Lake rare metal deposit, Northwest Territories, Canada. Economic Geology, 107(1), 81–104. doi:10.2113/econgeo.107.1.81

==== Uranium, base metals and diamonds ====
- Hall, R. (2013). Diamond mining in Canada's Northwest Territories: A colonial continuity. Antipode, 45(2), 376–393. doi:10.1111/j.1467-8330.2012.01012.x
- Keeling, A., & Sandlos, J. (Eds.). (2015). Mining and communities in northern Canada: History, politics, and memory. University of Calgary Press. JSTOR j.ctv6gqt3h
- Keeling, A., & Sandlos, J. (2017). Ghost towns and zombie mines: The historical dimensions of mine abandonment, reclamation, and redevelopment in the Canadian North. In S. Bocking & B. Martin (Eds.), Ice blink: Navigating northern environmental history (pp. 377–420). University of Calgary Press. doi:10.1515/9781552388563-011
- Sandlos, J., & Keeling, A. (2012). Claiming the new north: Development and colonialism at the Pine Point Mine, Northwest Territories, Canada. Environment and History, 18(1), 5–34. doi:10.3197/096734012x13225062753543
- Van Wyck, P. C. (2010). The highway of the atom. McGill-Queen's University Press. doi:10.1515/9780773580879

=== Oil and natural gas ===
- Berger, T. R. (1977). Northern frontier, northern homeland: The report of the Mackenzie Valley Pipeline Inquiry. Supply and Services Canada.
- Dosman, E. J. (1975). The national interest: The politics of northern development, 1968–75. McClelland and Stewart.
- Nuttall, M. (2008). Aboriginal participation, consultation, and Canada's Mackenzie Gas Project. Energy & Environment, 19(5), 617–634. doi:10.1260/095830508784815900
- Watkins, M. (Ed.). (1977). Dene Nation: The colony within. University of Toronto Press. doi:10.3138/9781487574451

=== Population ===
- Christensen, J. (2017). No home in a homeland: Indigenous peoples and homelessness in the Canadian north. UBC Press. doi:10.59962/9780774833967
- Farish, M., & Lackenbauer, P. W. (2009). High modernism in the Arctic: Planning Frobisher Bay and Inuvik. Journal of Historical Geography, 35(3), 517–544. doi:10.1016/j.jhg.2009.02.002

== Reference works ==
- Damas, D. (Ed.). (1984). Handbook of North American Indians: Vol. 5. Arctic. Smithsonian Institution.
- Helm, J. (Ed.). (1981). Handbook of North American Indians: Vol. 6. Subarctic. Smithsonian Institution.
- Nuttall, M. (Ed.). (2005). Encyclopedia of the Arctic. Routledge. doi:10.4324/9780203997857

== Primary sources ==
=== Exploration accounts ===
- Amundsen, R. (2014). The North West Passage: Being the record of a voyage of exploration of the ship Gjøa 1903–1907 (Vols. 1–2). Cambridge University Press. doi:10.1017/cbo9781107294486 doi:10.1017/cbo9781107294493 (Original work published 1908) (Note: The second volume is written with Godfred Hansen.)
- Franklin, J. (1823). Narrative of a journey to the shores of the Polar Sea, in the years 1819, 20, 21, and 22. John Murray.
- Hearne, S. (1958). A journey from Prince of Wales's Fort in Hudson's Bay to the northern ocean, 1769, 1770, 1771, 1772 (R. Glover, Ed.). Macmillan. (Original work published 1795)
- McClintock, F. L. (2012). A narrative of the discovery of the fate of Sir John Franklin and his companions: The voyage of the Fox in the Arctic seas. Cambridge University Press. doi:10.1017/cbo9781139236522
- Rae, J. (2014). John Rae's Arctic correspondence, 1844–1855 (K. McGoogan, Ed.). TouchWood Editions.

=== Memoirs and oral histories ===
- Bennett, J., & Rowley, S. (Eds.). (2004). Uqalurait: An oral history of Nunavut. McGill-Queen's University Press. doi:10.1515/9780773570061
- Cruikshank, J. (1990). Life lived like a story: Life stories of three Yukon Native elders (in collaboration with A. Sidney, K. Smith, & A. Ned). UBC Press.
- Freeman, M. A. (2015). Life among the Qallunaat. University of Manitoba Press. doi:10.1515/9780887554926
- Nuligak. (1966). I, Nuligak (M. Metayer, Ed. & Trans.). Peter Martin Associates.
- Pitseolak, P., & Eber, D. H. (1993). People from our side: A life story with photographs and oral biography. McGill-Queen's University Press. doi:10.1515/9780773563933
- Wachowich, N., Awa, A. A., Katsak, R. K., & Katsak, S. P. (1999). Saqiyuq: Stories from the lives of three Inuit women. McGill-Queen's University Press.

=== Travel accounts ===
- Lopez, B. (1986). Arctic dreams: Imagination and desire in a northern landscape. Charles Scribner's Sons.
- Rasmussen, K. (1999). Across Arctic America: Narrative of the Fifth Thule Expedition. University of Alaska Press. (Original work published 1927)
- Stefansson, V. (1921). The friendly Arctic: The story of five years in polar regions. Macmillan.

== See also ==
- Canadian Arctic Archipelago
- Inuit
- Northern Canada
- Northwest Passage
- Nunavut
