= Bibliography of the history of the Inuit =

- Inuit
- Subject: Inuit
- Scope: Books, journal articles
- Period covered: Prehistory to the present
- Languages: English
- Related: Circumpolar peoples; Greenlandic Inuit; Inuit art; Inuit Nunangat; Iñupiat; Inuvialuit

This is a select bibliography of academic level books and journal articles about the history of the Inuit of Canada, Greenland, Siberia, and Alaska.

Inuit (Inuktitut: ᐃᓄᐃᑦ 'the people'; singular: Inuk) are a group of culturally and historically similar Indigenous peoples who traditionally inhabit the Arctic and Subarctic regions of North America and Russia, including Greenland, Labrador, Quebec, Nunavut, the Northwest Territories, Yukon (traditionally) and Alaska. The Inuit languages belong to the Eskaleut languages, also known as Inuit-Yupik-Unangan and as Eskimo–Aleut.

Bibliography contains academic level English language books (including translations) and journal articles, published mainly post World War II. (Note: Works published before World War II should be limited to areas where there are no significant post-World War II books on the subject or when the work in question has significant historical merit.) Book entries may have references to reviews published in academic journals or major newspapers and magazines when these could be considered helpful. These reference reviews also function as a resource to find other works on this subject.

Works listed here are cited in the notes or bibliographies of scholarly sources. Each is published by an academic or major trade press, written by a recognized expert, or substantially reviewed in scholarly journals; borderline cases are omitted. A selection of primary sources is included. Many of the books below carry their own bibliographies; see Further reading section for longer ones, and External links section for museums, heritage organizations and academic programs.

Citations follow APA style. (Note: Entries are in plain text APA 7 format; templates are used only for identifiers, reviews and notes.) Books have citations to academic journal or mainstream published reviews when available. For books only partly about the subject, give relevant chapter or section titles where useful and available. Translators of the original-language edition are included when possible, and a footnote gives the original-language edition.

== General works ==
- Crowe, K. J. (1991). A history of the original peoples of northern Canada (Rev. ed.). McGill-Queen's University Press.
- Damas, D. (Ed.). (1984). Handbook of North American Indians: Vol. 5. Arctic. Smithsonian Institution.
- Stern, P. R. (2004). Historical dictionary of the Inuit. Scarecrow Press.

== Prehistory and archaeology ==
- Dumond, D. E. (1977). The Eskimos and Aleuts. Thames and Hudson.
- Friesen, T. M., & Arnold, C. D. (2008). The timing of the Thule migration: New dates from the western Canadian Arctic. American Antiquity, 73(3), 527–538. doi:10.1017/s0002731600046850
- Friesen, T. M., & Mason, O. K. (Eds.). (2016). The Oxford handbook of the prehistoric Arctic. Oxford University Press. doi:10.1093/oxfordhb/9780199766956.001.0001
- Maxwell, M. S. (1985). Prehistory of the eastern Arctic. Academic Press.
- McGhee, R. (1978). Canadian Arctic prehistory. Van Nostrand Reinhold.
- McGhee, R. (1996). Ancient people of the Arctic. UBC Press.
- Park, R. W. (1993). The Dorset-Thule succession in Arctic North America: Assessing claims for culture contact. American Antiquity, 58(2), 203–234. JSTOR 281966
- Raghavan, M., DeGiorgio, M., Albrechtsen, A., Moltke, I., Skoglund, P., Korneliussen, T. S., Grønnow, B., Appelt, M., Gulløv, H. C., Friesen, T. M., Fitzhugh, W., Malmström, H., Rasmussen, S., Olsen, J., Melchior, L., Fuller, B. T., Fahrni, S. M., Stafford, T., Jr., Grimes, V., ... Willerslev, E. (2014). The genetic prehistory of the New World Arctic. Science, 345(6200), Article 1255832. doi:10.1126/science.1255832

== Contact ==
- Fossett, R. (2001). In order to live untroubled: Inuit of the central Arctic, 1550 to 1940. University of Manitoba Press. doi:10.1515/9780887553288
- Friesen, T. M. (2013). When worlds collide: Hunter-gatherer world-system change in the 19th century Canadian Arctic. University of Arizona Press.
- Harper, K. (2000). Give me my father's body: The life of Minik, the New York Eskimo. Steerforth Press.
- Oswalt, W. H. (1979). Eskimos and explorers. Chandler & Sharp.
- Woodman, D. C. (1991). Unravelling the Franklin mystery: Inuit testimony. McGill-Queen's University Press. doi:10.1515/9780773562899
- Woodman, D. C. (1995). Strangers among us. McGill-Queen's University Press. doi:10.1515/9780773565630

== Regions ==
=== Canada ===
- Alunik, I., Kolausok, E. D., & Morrison, D. A. (2003). Across time and tundra: The Inuvialuit of the western Arctic. Raincoast Books; University of Washington Press; Canadian Museum of Civilization.
- Billson, J. M., & Mancini, K. (2007). Inuit women: Their powerful spirit in a century of change. Rowman & Littlefield. doi:10.5040/9798216419068
- Brody, H. (1975). The people's land: Eskimos and whites in the eastern Arctic. Penguin.
- Cameron, E. (2015). Far off metal river: Inuit lands, settler stories, and the making of the contemporary Arctic. UBC Press. doi:10.59962/9780774828864
- Damas, D. (2002). Arctic migrants/Arctic villagers: The transformation of Inuit settlement in the central Arctic. McGill-Queen's University Press. doi:10.1515/9780773570412
- Duffy, R. Q. (1988). The road to Nunavut: The progress of the eastern Arctic Inuit since the Second World War. McGill-Queen's University Press.
- Grant, S. D. (2002). Arctic justice: On trial for murder, Pond Inlet, 1923. McGill-Queen's University Press. doi:10.1515/9780773570030
- Kennedy, J. C. (1995). People of the bays and headlands: Anthropological history and the fate of communities in the unknown Labrador. University of Toronto Press.
- Kulchyski, P., & Tester, F. J. (2007). Kiumajut (talking back): Game management and Inuit rights, 1900–1970. UBC Press. doi:10.59962/9780774855525
- Natcher, D. C., Felt, L., & Procter, A. (Eds.). (2012). Settlement, subsistence, and change among the Labrador Inuit: The Nunatsiavummiut experience. University of Manitoba Press. doi:10.1515/9780887554193
- Scottie, J., Bernauer, W., & Hicks, J. (2022). I will live for both of us: A history of colonialism, uranium mining, and Inuit resistance. University of Manitoba Press. doi:10.1515/9780887552670
- Stevenson, L. (2014). Life beside itself: Imagining care in the Canadian Arctic. University of California Press. doi:10.1525/9780520958555
- Vick-Westgate, A. (2002). Nunavik: Inuit-controlled education in Arctic Quebec. University of Calgary Press. doi:10.1515/9781552384220
- Wenzel, G. (1991). Animal rights, human rights: Ecology, economy and ideology in the Canadian Arctic. University of Toronto Press. doi:10.3138/9781442670877

=== Greenland ===
- Caulfield, R. A. (1997). Greenlanders, whales, and whaling: Sustainability and self-determination in the Arctic. University Press of New England. doi:10.1349/ddlp.777
- Dahl, J. (2000). Saqqaq: An Inuit hunting community in the modern world. University of Toronto Press. doi:10.3138/9781442679573
- Gad, F. (1971). The history of Greenland: Vol. 1. Earliest times to 1700 (E. Dupont, Trans.). McGill-Queen's University Press. doi:10.1515/9780773592858 (Original work published 1967)
- Gad, F. (1973). The history of Greenland: Vol. 2. 1700–1782. McGill-Queen's University Press. doi:10.1515/9780773592865
- Gad, F. (1983). The history of Greenland: Vol. 3. 1782–1808. McGill-Queen's University Press. doi:10.1515/9780773594432
- Nuttall, M. (1992). Arctic homeland: Kinship, community and development in northwest Greenland. University of Toronto Press.
- Rud, S. (2017). Colonialism in Greenland: Tradition, governance and legacy. Springer. doi:10.1007/978-3-319-46158-8
- Sørensen, A. K. (2007). Denmark-Greenland in the twentieth century. Museum Tusculanum Press. doi:10.26530/oapen_342354

=== Alaska ===
- Burch, E. S., Jr. (1998). The Iñupiaq Eskimo nations of northwest Alaska. University of Alaska Press.
- Burch, E. S., Jr. (2005). Alliance and conflict: The world system of the Iñupiaq Eskimos. University of Calgary Press. doi:10.1515/9781552382806
- Chance, N. A. (1990). The Iñupiat and Arctic Alaska: An ethnography of development. Holt, Rinehart and Winston.
- O'Neill, D. T. (1994). The firecracker boys. St. Martin's Press.
- Ray, D. J. (1975). The Eskimos of Bering Strait, 1650–1898. University of Washington Press.

=== Siberia ===
- Bronshtein, M. M., Dneprovsky, K. A., & Savinetsky, A. B. (2016). Ancient Eskimo cultures of Chukotka. In T. M. Friesen & O. K. Mason (Eds.), The Oxford handbook of the prehistoric Arctic. Oxford University Press. doi:10.1093/oxfordhb/9780199766956.013.53
- Mason, O. K. (1998). The contest between the Ipiutak, Old Bering Sea, and Birnirk polities and the origin of whaling during the first millennium A.D. along Bering Strait. Journal of Anthropological Archaeology, 17(3), 240–325. doi:10.1006/jaar.1998.0324
- Mason, O. K. (2016). Thule origins in the Old Bering Sea culture. In T. M. Friesen & O. K. Mason (Eds.), The Oxford handbook of the prehistoric Arctic. Oxford University Press. doi:10.1093/oxfordhb/9780199766956.013.26
- Mason, O. K., & Rasic, J. T. (2019). Walrusing, whaling and the origins of the Old Bering Sea culture. World Archaeology, 51(3), 454–483. doi:10.1080/00438243.2019.1723681

== Ethnic cleansing ==
- Grygier, P. S. (1994). A long way from home: The tuberculosis epidemic among the Inuit. McGill-Queen's University Press. doi:10.1515/9780773564855
- Marcus, A. R. (1995). Relocating Eden: The images and politics of Inuit exile in the Canadian Arctic. University Press of New England. doi:10.1349/ddlp.772
- McGrath, M. (2007). The long exile: A tale of Inuit betrayal and survival in the High Arctic. Alfred A. Knopf.
- Royal Commission on Aboriginal Peoples. (1994). The High Arctic relocation: A report on the 1953–55 relocation. Royal Commission on Aboriginal Peoples.
- Tester, F. J., & Kulchyski, P. (1994). Tammarniit (mistakes): Inuit relocation in the Eastern Arctic, 1939–63. UBC Press. doi:10.59962/9780774854795
- Truth and Reconciliation Commission of Canada. (2015). Canada's residential schools: The Inuit and northern experience (The final report of the Truth and Reconciliation Commission of Canada, Vol. 2). McGill-Queen's University Press. doi:10.1515/9780773598218

== Topical ==
=== Politics and government ===
- Dahl, J., Hicks, J., & Jull, P. (Eds.). (2000). Nunavut: Inuit regain control of their lands and their lives. International Work Group for Indigenous Affairs.
- Henderson, A. (2007). Nunavut: Rethinking political culture. UBC Press. doi:10.59962/9780774855655
- Hicks, J., & White, G. (2015). Made in Nunavut: An experiment in decentralized government. UBC Press. doi:10.59962/9780774831055
- Kulchyski, P. (2005). Like the sound of a drum: Aboriginal cultural politics in Denendeh and Nunavut. University of Manitoba Press. doi:10.1515/9780887553356
- Loukacheva, N. (2007). The Arctic promise: Legal and political autonomy of Greenland and Nunavut. University of Toronto Press. doi:10.3138/9781442684874
- Mitchell, M. (1996). From talking chiefs to a native corporate elite: The birth of class and nationalism among Canadian Inuit. McGill-Queen's University Press. JSTOR j.ctt806bn
- Shadian, J. M. (2014). The politics of Arctic sovereignty: Oil, ice, and Inuit governance. Routledge. doi:10.4324/9781315851419
- Watt-Cloutier, S. (2018). The right to be cold: One woman's fight to protect the Arctic and save the planet from climate change. University of Minnesota Press. doi:10.5749/j.ctt2204r9f

==== Legal ====
- Eber, D. H. (1997). Images of justice: A legal history of the Northwest Territories as traced through the Yellowknife Courthouse Collection of Inuit sculpture. McGill-Queen's University Press. doi:10.1515/9780773566934
- Grant, S. D. (2002). Arctic justice: On trial for murder, Pond Inlet, 1923. McGill-Queen's University Press. doi:10.1515/9780773570030
- Loukacheva, N. (2007). The Arctic promise: Legal and political autonomy of Greenland and Nunavut. University of Toronto Press. doi:10.3138/9781442684874
- Rasing, W. C. E. (2017). Too many people: Contact, disorder, change in an Inuit society, 1822–2015. Nunavut Arctic College Media.

=== Culture ===
- Balikci, A. (1970). The Netsilik Eskimo. Natural History Press.
- Briggs, J. L. (1970). Never in anger: Portrait of an Eskimo family. Harvard University Press.
- Dorais, L.-J. (2010). The language of the Inuit: Syntax, semantics, and society in the Arctic. McGill-Queen's University Press. doi:10.1515/9780773581623
- Stern, P. R., & Stevenson, L. (Eds.). (2006). Critical Inuit studies: An anthology of contemporary Arctic ethnography. University of Nebraska Press.

==== Art ====
- Auger, E. E. (2005). The way of Inuit art: Aesthetics and history in and beyond the Arctic. McFarland.
- Hessel, I., & Hessel, D. (1998). Inuit art: An introduction. Harry N. Abrams.
- Igloliorte, H. (2017). Curating Inuit Qaujimajatuqangit: Inuit knowledge in the Qallunaat art museum. Art Journal, 76(2), 100–113. doi:10.1080/00043249.2017.1367196
- Leroux, O., Jackson, M. E., & Freeman, M. A. (Eds.). (1994). Inuit women artists: Voices from Cape Dorset. Douglas & McIntyre; Canadian Museum of Civilization; University of Washington Press.
- Ray, D. J. (1977). Eskimo art: Tradition and innovation in north Alaska. University of Washington Press.
- Swinton, G. (1972). Sculpture of the Eskimo. McClelland and Stewart.

==== Literature ====
- Martin, K. (2012). Stories in a new skin: Approaches to Inuit literature. University of Manitoba Press. doi:10.1515/9780887554261
- McGrath, R. (1984). Canadian Inuit literature: The development of a tradition. National Museums of Canada.
- Petrone, P. (Ed.). (1988). Northern voices: Inuit writing in English. University of Toronto Press.

==== Language ====
- Dorais, L.-J. (1997). Quaqtaq: Modernity and identity in an Inuit community. University of Toronto Press.
- Dorais, L.-J. (2010). The language of the Inuit: Syntax, semantics, and society in the Arctic. McGill-Queen's University Press. doi:10.1515/9780773581623

==== Music and performance ====
- Cavanagh, B. (1982). Music of the Netsilik Eskimo: A study of stability and change (2 vols.). National Museums of Canada.
- Nattiez, J.-J. (1983). Some aspects of Inuit vocal games. Ethnomusicology, 27(3), 457. JSTOR 850655
- Nattiez, J.-J. (1999). Inuit throat-games and Siberian throat singing: A comparative, historical, and semiological approach. Ethnomusicology, 43(3), 399. JSTOR 852555

==== Film and media ====
- Evans, M. R. (2008). Isuma: Inuit video art. McGill-Queen's University Press. doi:10.1515/9780773574663
- Huhndorf, S. M. (2000). Nanook and his contemporaries: Imagining Eskimos in American culture, 1897–1922. Critical Inquiry, 27(1), 122–148. doi:10.1086/449001
- Roth, L. (2005). Something new in the air: The story of First Peoples television broadcasting in Canada. McGill-Queen's University Press.

=== Society ===
- Burch, E. S., Jr. (1975). Eskimo kinsmen: Changing family relationships in northwest Alaska. West Publishing.
- Collings, P. (2014). Becoming inummarik: Men's lives in an Inuit community. McGill-Queen's University Press. doi:10.1515/9780773590328
- Condon, R. G. (1987). Inuit youth: Growth and change in the Canadian Arctic. Rutgers University Press.
- Kral, M. J. (2019). The return of the sun: Suicide and reclamation among Inuit of Arctic Canada. Oxford University Press. doi:10.1093/oso/9780190269333.001.0001
- Matthiasson, J. S. (2009). Living on the land: Northern Baffin Inuit respond to change. University of Toronto Press.

==== Religion ====
- Kleivan, I., & Sonne, B. (1985). Eskimos: Greenland and Canada. Brill. doi:10.1163/9789004666382
- Laugrand, F., Oosten, J., & Trudel, F. (Eds.). (2005). Apostle to the Inuit: The journals and ethnographic notes of Edmund James Peck, the Baffin years, 1894–1905. University of Toronto Press. doi:10.3138/9781442670914
- Laugrand, F. B., & Oosten, J. G. (2010). Inuit shamanism and Christianity: Transitions and transformations in the twentieth century. McGill-Queen's University Press. doi:10.1515/9780773576360
- Merkur, D. (1991). Powers which we do not know: The gods and spirits of the Inuit. University of Idaho Press.

==== Education ====
- McGregor, H. E. (2010). Inuit education and schools in the eastern Arctic. UBC Press. doi:10.59962/9780774817462
- Truth and Reconciliation Commission of Canada. (2015). Canada's residential schools: The Inuit and northern experience (The final report of the Truth and Reconciliation Commission of Canada, Vol. 2). McGill-Queen's University Press. doi:10.1515/9780773598218
- Vick-Westgate, A. (2002). Nunavik: Inuit-controlled education in Arctic Quebec. University of Calgary Press. doi:10.1515/9781552384220

==== Gender and sexuality ====
- Billson, J. M., & Mancini, K. (2007). Inuit women: Their powerful spirit in a century of change. Rowman & Littlefield. doi:10.5040/9798216419068
- Collings, P. (2014). Becoming inummarik: Men's lives in an Inuit community. McGill-Queen's University Press. doi:10.1515/9780773590328
- Leroux, O., Jackson, M. E., & Freeman, M. A. (Eds.). (1994). Inuit women artists: Voices from Cape Dorset. Douglas & McIntyre; Canadian Museum of Civilization; University of Washington Press.
- Saladin d'Anglure, B. (2005). The 'third gender' of the Inuit. Diogenes, 52(4), 134–144. doi:10.1177/0392192105059478
- Saladin d'Anglure, B. (2018). Inuit stories of being and rebirth: Gender, shamanism, and the third sex. University of Manitoba Press. doi:10.1515/9780887555596
- Wachowich, N., Awa, A. A., Katsak, R. K., & Katsak, S. P. (1999). Saqiyuq: Stories from the lives of three Inuit women. McGill-Queen's University Press.

==== Health and medicine ====
- Bjerregaard, P., & Young, T. K. (Eds.). (2008). Health transitions in Arctic populations (ch. 2, "Greenland"; ch. 7, "Inuit"). University of Toronto Press. doi:10.3138/9781442688193
- Grygier, P. S. (1994). A long way from home: The tuberculosis epidemic among the Inuit. McGill-Queen's University Press. doi:10.1515/9780773564855
- Kral, M. J. (2019). The return of the sun: Suicide and reclamation among Inuit of Arctic Canada. Oxford University Press. doi:10.1093/oso/9780190269333.001.0001
- Stevenson, L. (2014). Life beside itself: Imagining care in the Canadian Arctic. University of California Press. doi:10.1525/9780520958555

==== Material culture and technology ====
- Issenman, B. K. (1997). Sinews of survival: The living legacy of Inuit clothing. UBC Press. doi:10.59962/9780774856416

=== Economy and subsistence ===
- Kulchyski, P., & Tester, F. J. (2007). Kiumajut (talking back): Game management and Inuit rights, 1900–1970. UBC Press. doi:10.59962/9780774855525
- Mitchell, M. (1996). From talking chiefs to a native corporate elite: The birth of class and nationalism among Canadian Inuit. McGill-Queen's University Press. JSTOR j.ctt806bn
- Wenzel, G. (1991). Animal rights, human rights: Ecology, economy and ideology in the Canadian Arctic. University of Toronto Press. doi:10.3138/9781442670877

==== Whaling and fur trade ====
- Bockstoce, J. R. (1986). Whales, ice, and men: The history of whaling in the western Arctic. University of Washington Press.
- Bockstoce, J. R. (2009). Furs and frontiers in the far North: The contest among native and foreign nations for the Bering Strait fur trade. Yale University Press. doi:10.12987/9780300154900
- Bockstoce, J. R. (2018). White fox and icy seas in the western Arctic: The fur trade, transportation, and change in the early twentieth century. Yale University Press. doi:10.12987/yale/9780300221794.001.0001
- Caulfield, R. A. (1997). Greenlanders, whales, and whaling: Sustainability and self-determination in the Arctic. University Press of New England. doi:10.1349/ddlp.777
- Eber, D. H. (1989). When the whalers were up North: Inuit memories from the eastern Arctic. McGill-Queen's University Press. doi:10.1515/9780773562042
- Goldring, P. (1986). Inuit economic responses to Euro-American contacts: Southeast Baffin Island, 1824–1940. Historical Papers, 21(1), 146–172. doi:10.7202/030951ar
- Ross, W. G. (1975). Whaling and Eskimos: Hudson Bay 1860–1915. National Museums of Canada.
- Ross, W. G. (1985). Arctic whalers, icy seas: Narratives of the Davis Strait whale fishery. Irwin.
- Stevenson, M. G. (1997). Inuit, whalers, and cultural persistence: Structure in Cumberland Sound and central Inuit social organization. Oxford University Press.

=== Environment and climate change ===
- Krupnik, I., & Jolly, D. (Eds.). (2002). The earth is faster now: Indigenous observations of Arctic environmental change. Arctic Research Consortium of the United States.
- Krupnik, I., Aporta, C., Gearheard, S., Laidler, G. J., & Kielsen Holm, L. (Eds.). (2010). SIKU: Knowing our ice: Documenting Inuit sea-ice knowledge and use. Springer. doi:10.1007/978-90-481-8587-0
- Watt-Cloutier, S. (2018). The right to be cold: One woman's fight to protect the Arctic and save the planet from climate change. University of Minnesota Press. doi:10.5749/j.ctt2204r9f

=== Military and the Cold War ===
- Farish, M., & Lackenbauer, P. W. (2009). High modernism in the Arctic: Planning Frobisher Bay and Inuvik. Journal of Historical Geography, 35(3), 517–544. doi:10.1016/j.jhg.2009.02.002
- Lackenbauer, P. W. (2013). The Canadian Rangers: A living history. UBC Press. doi:10.59962/9780774824545
- Lackenbauer, P. W., & Farish, M. (2007). The Cold War on Canadian soil: Militarizing a northern environment. Environmental History, 12(4), 920–950. doi:10.1093/envhis/12.4.920
- O'Neill, D. T. (1994). The firecracker boys. St. Martin's Press.

== Primary sources ==
- Bennett, J., & Rowley, S. (Eds.). (2004). Uqalurait: An oral history of Nunavut. McGill-Queen's University Press. doi:10.1515/9780773570061
- Boas, F. (1964). The Central Eskimo. University of Nebraska Press. (Original work published 1888)
- Freeman, M. A. (2015). Life among the Qallunaat (K. Martin & J. Rak, Eds.). University of Manitoba Press. doi:10.1515/9780887554926
- Hall, C. F. (1865). Arctic researches, and life among the Esquimaux: Being the narrative of an expedition in search of Sir John Franklin, in the years 1860, 1861, and 1862. Harper & Brothers.
- Hensley, W. L. I. (2009). Fifty miles from tomorrow: A memoir of Alaska and the real people. Sarah Crichton Books.
- Rasmussen, K. (1927). Across Arctic America: Narrative of the Fifth Thule Expedition. G. P. Putnam's Sons.
- Wachowich, N., Awa, A. A., Katsak, R. K., & Katsak, S. P. (1999). Saqiyuq: Stories from the lives of three Inuit women. McGill-Queen's University Press.

== See also ==
- Bibliography of Canada
- Bibliography of Canadian history
- Bibliography of Greenland
- Circumpolar peoples
- Inuit Nunangat
