= Bibliography of the history of Siberia =

Bibliography of Siberia
- Siberia
- Subject: Siberia
- Scope: Books, journal articles, book chapters
- Period covered: Prehistory to the present
- Languages: English
- Related: History of Siberia; Indigenous peoples of Siberia; Russian conquest of Siberia; Russian Far East

This is a select bibliography of academic level books and journal articles about Siberia and the Russian Far East: their history, peoples, languages, geography and environment. The bibliography runs from prehistory and the Russian conquest through imperial colonization and exile, the revolutionary and Soviet periods, the Gulag and the post-Soviet era, and covers archaeology, the indigenous peoples of Siberia and their languages, ethnic cleansing and genocide, religion, literature, exploration, regionalism, economic development and the Russian Far East's ties with China and Korea.

Siberia (Russian: Сибирь, romanized: Sibir') is a vast geographical region that makes up all of North Asia, extending from the Ural Mountains in the west, where the Ural River usually marks the southern end of its western boundary, to the Pacific Ocean in the east. It has been part of Russia since the Russian conquest, which began with the fall of the Khanate of Sibir in 1582 and ended with the annexation of Chukotka in 1778. The region covers more than 13.1 million km^{2} (5.1 million sq mi), about three-quarters of Russia's land area, but holds only about a quarter of the country's population. Its largest cities are Novosibirsk, Krasnoyarsk and Omsk.

Bibliography contains academic level English language books (including translations) and journal articles, published mainly post World War II. (Note: Works published before World War II should be limited to areas where there are no significant post-World War II books on the subject or when the work in question has significant historical merit.) Book entries may have references to reviews published in academic journals or major newspapers and magazines when these could be considered helpful. These reference reviews also function as a resource to find other works on this subject.

Works listed here are cited in the notes or bibliographies of scholarly sources. Each is published by an academic or major trade press, written by a recognized expert, or substantially reviewed in scholarly journals; borderline cases are omitted. A selection of primary sources is included. Many of the books below carry their own bibliographies; see Further reading section for longer ones, and External links section for museums, library collections and academic programs.

Citations follow APA style. (Note: Entries are in plain text APA 7 format; templates are used only for identifiers, reviews and notes.) Books have citations to academic journal or mainstream published reviews when available. For books only partly about the subject, give relevant chapter or section titles where useful and available. Translators of the original-language edition are included when possible, and a footnote gives the original-language edition.

== General works ==
- Bobrick, B. (1992). East of the sun: The epic conquest and tragic history of Siberia. Poseidon Press.
- Forsyth, J. (1992). A history of the peoples of Siberia: Russia's North Asian colony 1581–1990. Cambridge University Press.
- Hartley, J. M. (2014). Siberia: A history of the people. Yale University Press.
- Kotkin, S., & Wolff, D. (Eds.). (1995). Rediscovering Russia in Asia: Siberia and the Russian Far East. M. E. Sharpe.
- Lincoln, W. B. (1994). The conquest of a continent: Siberia and the Russians. Random House.
- Mote, V. L. (1998). Siberia: Worlds apart. Westview Press.
- Naumov, I. V. (2006). The history of Siberia (D. N. Collins, Ed.). Routledge.
- Semyonov, Y. (1963). Siberia: Its conquest and development (J. R. Foster, Trans.). Hollis & Carter. (Note: Originally published in German as Semjonow, J. (1954). Sibirien. Ullstein.)
- Stephan, J. J. (1994). The Russian Far East: A history. Stanford University Press.
- Stolberg, E.-M. (Ed.). (2005). The Siberian saga: A history of Russia's wild east. Peter Lang.
- Wood, A. (2011). Russia's frozen frontier: A history of Siberia and the Russian Far East 1581–1991. Bloomsbury Academic.
- Wood, A. (Ed.). (1991). The history of Siberia: From Russian conquest to revolution. Routledge.

== Archaeology and prehistory ==
- Derev'anko, A. P., Shimkin, D. B., & Powers, W. R. (Eds.). (1998). The Paleolithic of Siberia: New discoveries and interpretations (I. P. Laricheva, Trans.). University of Illinois Press.
- Goebel, T. (1999). Pleistocene human colonization of Siberia and peopling of the Americas: An ecological approach. Evolutionary Anthropology, 8(6), 208–227. doi:10.1002/(SICI)1520-6505(1999)8:6<208::AID-EVAN2>3.0.CO;2-M
- Pitulko, V. V., Nikolsky, P. A., Girya, E. Yu., Basilyan, A. E., Tumskoy, V. E., Koulakov, S. A., Astakhov, S. N., Pavlova, E. Yu., & Anisimov, M. A. (2004). The Yana RHS site: Humans in the Arctic before the Last Glacial Maximum. Science, 303(5654), 52–56. doi:10.1126/science.1085219
- Rudenko, S. I. (1970). Frozen tombs of Siberia: The Pazyryk burials of Iron Age horsemen (M. W. Thompson, Trans.). University of California Press. (Note: A translation of Rudenko's Kul'tura naseleniia Gornogo Altaia v skifskoe vremia [The culture of the population of the Altai Mountains in Scythian times].)
- Weber, A. W., Katzenberg, M. A., & Schurr, T. G. (Eds.). (2010). Prehistoric hunter-gatherers of the Baikal region, Siberia: Bioarchaeological studies of past life ways. University of Pennsylvania Press. doi:10.9783/9781934536391

== History ==
=== Exploration and colonization ===
- Fisher, R. H. (1943). The Russian fur trade, 1550–1700. University of California Press.
- Fisher, R. H. (1977). Bering's voyages: Whither and why. University of Washington Press.
- Frost, O. W. (2003). Bering: The Russian discovery of America. Yale University Press.
- Gibson, J. R. (1969). Feeding the Russian fur trade: Provisionment of the Okhotsk seaboard and the Kamchatka Peninsula, 1639–1856. University of Wisconsin Press.
- Golder, F. A. (1914). Russian expansion on the Pacific, 1641–1850. Arthur H. Clark.
- Kivelson, V. A. (2006). Cartographies of tsardom: The land and its meanings in seventeenth-century Russia. Cornell University Press.
- Lantzeff, G. V. (1943). Siberia in the seventeenth century: A study of the colonial administration. University of California Press.
- Lantzeff, G. V., & Pierce, R. A. (1973). Eastward to empire: Exploration and conquest on the Russian open frontier, to 1750. McGill-Queen's University Press.
- Monahan, E. (2016). The merchants of Siberia: Trade in early modern Eurasia. Cornell University Press.
- Witzenrath, C. (2007). Cossacks and the Russian Empire, 1598–1725: Manipulation, rebellion and expansion into Siberia. Routledge.

=== Russian Imperial Siberia ===
- Bassin, M. (1983). The Russian Geographical Society, the "Amur epoch," and the Great Siberian Expedition 1855–1863. Annals of the Association of American Geographers, 73(2), 240–256. doi:10.1111/j.1467-8306.1983.tb01411.x
- Bassin, M. (1999). Imperial visions: Nationalist imagination and geographical expansion in the Russian Far East, 1840–1865. Cambridge University Press.
- Breyfogle, N. B., Schrader, A., & Sunderland, W. (Eds.). (2007). Peopling the Russian periphery: Borderland colonization in Eurasian history. Routledge.
- Brower, D. R., & Lazzerini, E. J. (Eds.). (1997). Russia's orient: Imperial borderlands and peoples, 1700–1917. Indiana University Press.
- Corrado, S. M. (2014). A land divided: Sakhalin and the Amur Expedition of G. I. Nevel'skoi, 1848–1855. Journal of Historical Geography, 45, 70–81. doi:10.1016/j.jhg.2014.05.030
- Corrado, S. M. (2015). "The highest limit of statesmanship": Ritterian geography and Russian exploration of the Amur River basin, 1849–1853. Sibirica, 14(2), 1–28. doi:10.3167/sib.2015.140201
- Gibson, J. R. (1972). The significance of Siberia to tsarist Russia. Canadian Slavonic Papers, 14(3), 442–453. doi:10.1080/00085006.1972.11091287
- Hartley, J. M. (2008). Gizhiga: Military presence and social encounters in Russia's Wild East. Slavonic and East European Review, 86(4), 665–684. doi:10.1353/see.2008.0065
- Marks, S. G. (1991). Road to power: The Trans-Siberian Railroad and the colonization of Asian Russia, 1850–1917. Cornell University Press.
- Moon, D. (1997). Peasant migration and the settlement of Russia's frontiers, 1550–1897. The Historical Journal, 40(4), 859–893. doi:10.1017/S0018246X97007504
- Raeff, M. (1956). Siberia and the reforms of 1822. University of Washington Press.
- Stephan, J. J. (1971). Sakhalin: A history. Clarendon Press.
- Sunderland, W. (1996). Russians into Iakuts? "Going native" and problems of Russian national identity in the Siberian north, 1870s–1914. Slavic Review, 55(4), 806–825. JSTOR 2501239
- Sunderland, W. (2001). Peasant pioneering: Russian peasant settlers describe colonization and the eastern frontier, 1880s–1910s. Journal of Social History, 34(4), 895–922. doi:10.1353/jsh.2001.0070
- Sunderland, W. (2010). The Ministry of Asiatic Russia: The colonial office that never was but might have been. Slavic Review, 69(1), 120–150. doi:10.1017/S0037677900016727
- Treadgold, D. W. (1957). The great Siberian migration: Government and peasant in resettlement from emancipation to the First World War. Princeton University Press.
- Tupper, H. (1965). To the great ocean: Siberia and the Trans-Siberian Railway. Little, Brown.

=== China, Korea and the Russian Far East ===
- Afinogenov, G. (2020). Spies and scholars: Chinese secrets and imperial Russia's quest for world power. Harvard University Press.
- Chang, J. K. (2016). Burnt by the sun: The Koreans of the Russian Far East. University of Hawai'i Press.
- Foust, C. M. (1969). Muscovite and mandarin: Russia's trade with China and its setting, 1727–1805. University of North Carolina Press.
- Paine, S. C. M. (1996). Imperial rivals: China, Russia, and their disputed frontier. M. E. Sharpe.
- Urbansky, S. (2020). Beyond the steppe frontier: A history of the Sino-Russian border. Princeton University Press.
- Wolff, D. (1999). To the Harbin station: The liberal alternative in Russian Manchuria, 1898–1914. Stanford University Press. doi:10.1515/9780804764056
- Zatsepine, V. (2017). Beyond the Amur: Frontier encounters between China and Russia, 1850–1930. UBC Press.

=== Exile and the katorga system ===
- Badcock, S. (2013). From villains to victims: Experiencing illness in Siberian exile. Europe-Asia Studies, 65(9), 1716–1736. doi:10.1080/09668136.2013.840116
- Badcock, S. (2016). A prison without walls? Eastern Siberian exile in the last years of tsarism. Oxford University Press.
- Beer, D. (2013). Decembrists, rebels, and martyrs in Siberian exile: The "Zerentui conspiracy" of 1828 and the fashioning of a revolutionary genealogy. Slavic Review, 72(3), 528–551. doi:10.5612/slavicreview.72.3.0528
- Beer, D. (2016). The house of the dead: Siberian exile under the tsars. Allen Lane.
- Gentes, A. A. (2005). Katorga: Penal labor and tsarist Siberia. In E.-M. Stolberg (Ed.), The Siberian saga: A history of Russia's wild east (pp. 73–85). Peter Lang.
- Gentes, A. A. (2008). Exile to Siberia, 1590–1822. Palgrave Macmillan.
- Gentes, A. A. (2010). Exile, murder and madness in Siberia, 1823–61. Palgrave Macmillan.
- Gentes, A. A. (2012). Sakhalin as cause célèbre: The re-signification of tsarist Russia's penal colony. Acta Slavica Iaponica, 32, 55–72.
- Gentes, A. A. (2021). Russia's Sakhalin penal colony, 1849–1917: Imperialism and exile. Routledge.
- Mazour, A. G. (1937). The first Russian revolution, 1825: The Decembrist movement, its origins, development, and significance. University of California Press.
- Phillips, B. (2019). "A nihilist kurort": Siberian exile in the Victorian imagination, c.1830–1890. Slavonic and East European Review, 97(3), 471. doi:10.5699/slaveasteurorev2.97.3.0471
- Popova, Z. (2018). Exile as imperial practice: Western Siberia and the Russian Empire, 1879–1900. International Review of Social History, 63(S26), 131–150. doi:10.1017/S0020859018000251
- Schrader, A. M. (2007). Unruly felons and civilizing wives: Cultivating marriage in the Siberian exile system, 1822–1860. Slavic Review, 66(2), 230–256. JSTOR 20060219
- Sutherland, C. (1984). The princess of Siberia: The story of Maria Volkonsky and the Decembrist exiles. Farrar, Straus & Giroux.

=== Russian Revolution and Civil War ===
- Isitt, B. (2006). Mutiny from Victoria to Vladivostok, December 1918. Canadian Historical Review, 87(2), 223–264. doi:10.3138/CHR/87.2.223
- Pereira, N. G. O. (1993). Lenin and the Siberian peasant insurrections. In G. Diment & Y. Slezkine (Eds.), Between heaven and hell: The myth of Siberia in Russian culture (pp. 133–150). St. Martin's Press. doi:10.1007/978-1-137-08914-4_8
- Pereira, N. G. O. (1996). White Siberia: The politics of civil war. McGill-Queen's University Press.
- Sablin, I. (2018). The rise and fall of Russia's Far Eastern Republic, 1905–1922: Nationalisms, imperialisms, and regionalisms in and after the Russian Empire. Routledge. doi:10.4324/9780429455278
- Smele, J. D. (1996). Civil war in Siberia: The anti-Bolshevik government of Admiral Kolchak, 1918–1920. Cambridge University Press.
- Sunderland, W. (2014). The baron's cloak: A history of the Russian Empire in war and revolution. Cornell University Press.
- Unterberger, B. M. (1956). America's Siberian expedition, 1918–1920: A study of national policy. Duke University Press.
- White, J. A. (1950). The Siberian intervention. Princeton University Press.
- Winegard, T. C. (2007). The Canadian Siberian Expeditionary Force, 1918–1919, and the complications of coalition warfare. The Journal of Slavic Military Studies, 20(2), 283–328. doi:10.1080/13518040701378345

=== Soviet Siberia ===
- Hughes, J. (1991). Stalin, Siberia and the crisis of the New Economic Policy. Cambridge University Press.
- Hughes, J. (1996). Stalinism in a Russian province: A study of collectivization and dekulakization in Siberia. St. Martin's Press.
- Josephson, P. R. (1997). New Atlantis revisited: Akademgorodok, the Siberian city of science. Princeton University Press.
- Lieberman, S. R. (1983). The evacuation of industry in the Soviet Union during World War II. Soviet Studies, 35(1), 90–102. doi:10.1080/09668138308411460
- McCannon, J. (1998). Red Arctic: Polar exploration and the myth of the north in the Soviet Union, 1932–1939. Oxford University Press.
- Shulman, E. (2008). Stalinism on the frontier of empire: Women and state formation in the Soviet Far East. Cambridge University Press.
- Weinberg, R. (1998). Stalin's forgotten Zion: Birobidzhan and the making of a Soviet Jewish homeland: An illustrated history, 1928–1996. University of California Press.

==== Gulag ====
- Adler, N. (2002). The Gulag survivor: Beyond the Soviet system. Transaction Publishers.
- Alexopoulos, G. (2005). Amnesty 1945: The revolving door of Stalin's Gulag. Slavic Review, 64(2), 274–306. JSTOR 3649985
- Alexopoulos, G. (2017). Illness and inhumanity in Stalin's Gulag. Yale University Press.
- Applebaum, A. (2003). Gulag: A history. Doubleday.
- Bacon, E. (1994). The Gulag at war: Stalin's forced labour system in the light of the archives. New York University Press.
- Barnes, S. A. (2000). All for the front, all for victory! The mobilization of forced labor in the Soviet Union during World War Two. International Labor and Working-Class History, 58, 239–260. doi:10.1017/S0147547900003690
- Barnes, S. A. (2011). Death and redemption: The Gulag and the shaping of Soviet society. Princeton University Press.
- Bell, W. T. (2013). Was the Gulag an archipelago? De-convoyed prisoners and porous borders in the camps of western Siberia. The Russian Review, 72(1), 116–141. doi:10.1111/russ.10683
- Bell, W. T. (2018). Stalin's Gulag at war: Forced labour, mass death, and Soviet victory in the Second World War. University of Toronto Press.
- Bollinger, M. J. (2003). Stalin's slave ships: Kolyma, the Gulag fleet, and the role of the West. Praeger.
- Borodkin, L., & Ertz, S. (2005). Forced labour and the need for motivation: Wages and bonuses in the Stalinist camp system. Comparative Economic Studies, 47(2), 418–436. doi:10.1057/palgrave.ces.8100102
- Brown, K. (2007). Out of solitary confinement: The history of the Gulag. Kritika: Explorations in Russian and Eurasian History, 8(1), 67–103. doi:10.1353/kri.2007.0001
- Conquest, R. (1978). Kolyma: The Arctic death camps. Viking Press.
- Dobson, M. (2009). Khrushchev's cold summer: Gulag returnees, crime, and the fate of reform after Stalin. Cornell University Press.
- Ertz, S. (2005). Trading effort for freedom: Workday credits in the Stalinist camp system. Comparative Economic Studies, 47(2), 476–491. doi:10.1057/palgrave.ces.8100106
- Gregory, P. R., & Lazarev, V. (Eds.). (2003). The economics of forced labor: The Soviet Gulag. Hoover Institution Press.
- Hardy, J. S. (2016). The Gulag after Stalin: Redefining punishment in Khrushchev's Soviet Union, 1953–1964. Cornell University Press.
- Healey, D. (2015). Lives in the balance: Weak and disabled prisoners and the biopolitics of the Gulag. Kritika: Explorations in Russian and Eurasian History, 16(3), 527–556. doi:10.1353/kri.2015.0047
- Ivanova, G. M. (2000). Labor camp socialism: The Gulag in the Soviet totalitarian system (C. A. Flath, Trans.; D. J. Raleigh, Ed.). M. E. Sharpe.
- Jakobson, M. (1993). Origins of the GULAG: The Soviet prison camp system, 1917–1934. University Press of Kentucky.
- Khlevniuk, O. V. (2004). The history of the Gulag: From collectivization to the Great Terror (V. A. Staklo, Trans.). Yale University Press.
- Nordlander, D. J. (1998). Origins of a Gulag capital: Magadan and Stalinist control in the early 1930s. Slavic Review, 57(4), 791–812. JSTOR 2501047
- Swianiewicz, S. (1965). Forced labour and economic development: An enquiry into the experience of Soviet industrialization. Oxford University Press.
- Toker, L. (2000). Return from the archipelago: Narratives of Gulag survivors. Indiana University Press.
- Viola, L. (2007). The unknown Gulag: The lost world of Stalin's special settlements. Oxford University Press.
- Werth, N. (2007). Cannibal island: Death in a Siberian Gulag (S. Rendall, Trans.). Princeton University Press. (Note: Originally published in French as Werth, N. (2006). L'île aux cannibales: 1933, une déportation-abandon en Sibérie. Perrin.)

=== Post-Soviet Siberia ===
- Alexseev, M. A. (2001). Socioeconomic and security implications of Chinese migration in the Russian Far East. Post-Soviet Geography and Economics, 42(2), 122–141. doi:10.1080/10889388.2001.10641166
- Alexseev, M. A. (2003). Economic valuations and interethnic fears: Perceptions of Chinese migration in the Russian Far East. Journal of Peace Research, 40(1), 85–102. doi:10.1177/0022343303040001207
- Billé, F., & Humphrey, C. (2021). On the edge: Life along the Russia–China border. Harvard University Press.
- Holzlehner, T. (2007). "The harder the rain, the tighter the roof": Evolution of organized crime networks in the Russian Far East. Sibirica, 6(2). doi:10.3167/sib.2007.060203
- Humphrey, C. (2002). The unmaking of Soviet life: Everyday economies after socialism. Cornell University Press.
- Kirkow, P. (1998). Russia's provinces: Authoritarian transformation versus local autonomy? St. Martin's Press.
- Kuhrt, N. (2012). The Russian Far East in Russia's Asia policy: Dual integration or double periphery? Europe-Asia Studies, 64(3), 471–493. doi:10.1080/09668136.2012.661926
- Lee, R., & Lukin, A. (2015). Russia's Far East: New dynamics in Asia Pacific and beyond. Lynne Rienner Publishers.
- Ryzhova, N. (2008). Informal economy of translocations: The case of the twin city of Blagoveshensk–Heihe. Inner Asia, 10(2), 323–351. doi:10.1163/000000008793066731
- Ryzhova, N., & Ioffe, G. (2009). Trans-border exchange between Russia and China: The case of Blagoveshchensk and Heihe. Eurasian Geography and Economics, 50(3), 348–364. doi:10.2747/1539-7216.50.3.348
- Thornton, J., & Ziegler, C. E. (Eds.). (2002). Russia's Far East: A region at risk. University of Washington Press.

=== Regionalism and identity ===
- Bassin, M. (1988). Expansion and colonialism on the eastern frontier: Views of Siberia and the Far East in pre-Petrine Russia. Journal of Historical Geography, 14(1), 3–21. doi:10.1016/S0305-7488(88)80124-5
- Bassin, M. (1991). Inventing Siberia: Visions of the Russian East in the early nineteenth century. The American Historical Review, 96(3), 763. JSTOR 2162430
- Bassin, M. (1993). Turner, Solov'ev, and the "frontier hypothesis": The nationalist signification of open spaces. The Journal of Modern History, 65(3), 473–511. doi:10.1086/244672
- Diment, G., & Slezkine, Y. (Eds.). (1993). Between heaven and hell: The myth of Siberia in Russian culture. St. Martin's Press.
- Etkind, A. (2011). Internal colonization: Russia's imperial experience. Polity Press.
- Gibson, J. R. (1993). Paradoxical perceptions of Siberia: Patrician and plebeian images up to the mid-1800s. In G. Diment & Y. Slezkine (Eds.), Between heaven and hell: The myth of Siberia in Russian culture (pp. 67–93). St. Martin's Press. doi:10.1007/978-1-137-08914-4_5
- Hughes, J. (1994). Regionalism in Russia: The rise and fall of Siberian Agreement. Europe-Asia Studies, 46(7), 1133–1161. doi:10.1080/09668139408412222
- Kharus, O., & Shevtsov, V. (2017). Autonomous Siberia in Russia's reorganization projects at the beginning of the twentieth century. Sibirica, 16(2). doi:10.3167/sib.2017.160202
- Pereira, N. G. O. (1993). The idea of Siberian regionalism in late imperial and revolutionary Russia. Russian History, 20(4), 163–178. doi:10.1163/187633193X00117
- Smith-Peter, S. (2018). The six waves of Russian regionalism in European context, 1830–2000. In E. W. Clowes, G. Erbslöh, & A. Kokobobo (Eds.), Russia's regional identities: The power of the provinces (pp. 15–43). Routledge. doi:10.4324/9781315513331-2
- Von Mohrenschildt, D. (1981). Toward a united states of Russia: Plans and projects of federal reconstruction of Russia in the nineteenth century. Fairleigh Dickinson University Press.
- Watrous, S. (1993). The regionalist conception of Siberia, 1860 to 1920. In G. Diment & Y. Slezkine (Eds.), Between heaven and hell: The myth of Siberia in Russian culture (pp. 113–132). St. Martin's Press. doi:10.1007/978-1-137-08914-4_7

== Ethnography ==
=== General studies ===
- Anderson, D. G. (2006). The Turukhansk polar census expedition of 1926–1927 at the crossroads of two scientific traditions. Sibirica, 5(1). doi:10.3167/136173606780265252
- Balzer, M. M. (1996). Flights of the sacred: Symbolism and theory in Siberian shamanism. American Anthropologist, 98(2), 305–318. doi:10.1525/aa.1996.98.2.02a00070
- Balzer, M. M. (Ed.). (1990). Shamanism: Soviet studies of traditional religion in Siberia and Central Asia. M. E. Sharpe.
- Czaplicka, M. A. (1914). Aboriginal Siberia: A study in social anthropology. Clarendon Press.
- Diószegi, V. (Ed.). (1968). Popular beliefs and folklore tradition in Siberia (Uralic and Altaic Series, Vol. 57). Indiana University Press. (Note: Co-published with Mouton.)
- Eliade, M. (1964). Shamanism: Archaic techniques of ecstasy (W. R. Trask, Trans.). Pantheon Books. (Note: Originally published in French as Eliade, M. (1951). Le chamanisme et les techniques archaïques de l'extase. Librairie Payot.)
- Gray, P. A., Vakhtin, N., & Schweitzer, P. (2003). Who owns Siberian ethnography? A critical assessment of a re-internationalized field. Sibirica, 3(2). doi:10.1080/1361736042000245312
- Hutton, R. (2001). Shamans: Siberian spirituality and the Western imagination. Hambledon and London.
- Istomin, K. V. (2020). Post-Soviet reindeer herders: Between family and collective herding. Region: Regional Studies of Russia, Eastern Europe, and Central Asia, 9(1), 25–52. doi:10.1353/reg.2020.0005
- Krupnik, I. (1993). Arctic adaptations: Native whalers and reindeer herders of northern Eurasia (M. Levenson, Ed. & Trans.). University Press of New England. (Note: A translation of Krupnik, I. (1989). Arkticheskaia etnoekologiia [Arctic ethnoecology]. Nauka.)
- Levin, M. G., & Potapov, L. P. (Eds.). (1964). The peoples of Siberia (Scripta Technica, Trans.). University of Chicago Press. (Note: Originally published in Russian as Levin, M. G., & Potapov, L. P. (Eds.). (1956). Narody Sibiri [The peoples of Siberia]. Izdatel'stvo Akademii nauk SSSR.)
- Pika, A. (Ed.). (1999). Neotraditionalism in the Russian North: Indigenous peoples and the legacy of perestroika (B. Grant, Ed.). University of Washington Press.
- Reid, A. (2002). The shaman's coat: A native history of Siberia. Walker & Company.
- Rockhill, E. K., Sidorova, L., & Vitebsky, P. (2022). Where is the nomadic family? Rigid laws and flexible tundra life in north-east Siberia. Nomadic Peoples, 26(1), 4–32. doi:10.3197/np.2022.260102
- Shimkin, D. B. (1990). Siberian ethnography: A current assessment. Cahiers du monde russe et soviétique, 31(2), 317–326. doi:10.3406/cmr.1990.2230
- Slezkine, Y. (1992). From savages to citizens: The cultural revolution in the Soviet far north, 1928–1938. Slavic Review, 51(1), 52–76. JSTOR 2500261
- Slezkine, Y. (1993). Savage Christians or unorthodox Russians? The missionary dilemma in Siberia. In G. Diment & Y. Slezkine (Eds.), Between heaven and hell: The myth of Siberia in Russian culture (pp. 15–31). St. Martin's Press. doi:10.1007/978-1-137-08914-4_2
- Slezkine, Y. (1994). Arctic mirrors: Russia and the small peoples of the north. Cornell University Press.

=== Altaians and Telengits ===
- Halemba, A. (2006). The Telengits of southern Siberia: Landscape, religion and knowledge in motion. Routledge.
- Sherstova, L. I. (2006). Burkhanism in Gorny Altai. Anthropology & Archeology of Eurasia, 45(2), 14–43. doi:10.2753/AAE1061-1959450202

=== Buryats ===
- Bernstein, A. (2013). Religious bodies politic: Rituals of sovereignty in Buryat Buddhism. University of Chicago Press.
- Chakars, M. (2014). The socialist way of life in Siberia: Transformation in Buryatia. Central European University Press.
- Humphrey, C. (1983). Karl Marx collective: Economy, society and religion in a Siberian collective farm. Cambridge University Press. (Note: An updated edition was published as Humphrey, C. (1998). Marx went away—but Karl stayed behind. University of Michigan Press.)
- Quijada, J. B. (2019). Buddhists, shamans, and Soviets: Rituals of history in post-Soviet Buryatia. Oxford University Press.

=== Chukchi and Siberian Yupik ===
- Bockstoce, J. R. (2009). Furs and frontiers in the Far North: The contest among Native and foreign nations for the Bering Strait fur trade. Yale University Press.
- Bogoras, W. (1904–1909). The Chukchee (Publications of the Jesup North Pacific Expedition, Vol. 7). E. J. Brill.
- Gray, P. A. (2005). The predicament of Chukotka's indigenous movement: Post-Soviet activism in the Russian Far North. Cambridge University Press.
- Gray, P. A. (2006). "The last kulak" and other stories of post-privatisation life in Chukotka's tundra. Nomadic Peoples, 10(2), 50–67. doi:10.3167/np.2006.100204
- Kerttula, A. M. (2000). Antler on the sea: The Yup'ik and Chukchi of the Russian Far East. Cornell University Press.
- Krupnik, I., & Chlenov, M. (2013). Yupik transitions: Change and survival at Bering Strait, 1900–1960. University of Alaska Press.

=== Dolgans and Nganasans ===
- Ziker, J. P. (2003). Assigned territories, family/clan/communal holdings, and common-pool resources in the Taimyr Autonomous Region, northern Russia. Human Ecology, 31(3), 331–368. doi:10.1023/A:1025024804641
- Ziker, J. P. (2006). The social movement of meat in Taimyr, northern Russia. Nomadic Peoples, 10(2), 105–122. doi:10.3167/np.2006.100207

=== Evenki and Eveny ===
- Anderson, D. G. (2000). Identity and ecology in Arctic Siberia: The number one reindeer brigade. Oxford University Press.
- Bloch, A. (2004). Red ties and residential schools: Indigenous Siberians in a post-Soviet state. University of Pennsylvania Press.
- Campbell, C. (2014). Agitating images: Photography against history in Indigenous Siberia. University of Minnesota Press. doi:10.5749/minnesota/9780816681051.001.0001
- Fondahl, G. A. (1998). Gaining ground? Evenkis, land, and reform in southeastern Siberia. Allyn and Bacon.
- Shirokogoroff, S. M. (1929). Social organization of the northern Tungus. Commercial Press.
- Shirokogoroff, S. M. (1935). Psychomental complex of the Tungus. Kegan Paul, Trench, Trubner & Co.
- Ssorin-Chaikov, N. V. (2003). The social life of the state in subarctic Siberia. Stanford University Press.
- Vitebsky, P. (2005). The reindeer people: Living with animals and spirits in Siberia. HarperCollins.

=== Kets ===
- Shimkin, D. B. (1939). A sketch of the Ket, or Yenisei "Ostyak". Ethnos, 4(3–4), 147–176. doi:10.1080/00141844.1939.9980564
- Vajda, E. J. (2001). Yeniseian peoples and languages: A history of Yeniseian studies with an annotated bibliography and a source guide. Curzon Press.

=== Khanty and Mansi ===
- Balzer, M. M. (1999). The tenacity of ethnicity: A Siberian saga in global perspective. Princeton University Press.
- Jordan, P. (2003). Material culture and sacred landscape: The anthropology of the Siberian Khanty. AltaMira Press.
- Wiget, A., & Balalaeva, O. (2011). Khanty, people of the taiga: Surviving the 20th century. University of Alaska Press.

=== Koryaks ===
- Gerkey, D. (2016). The emergence of institutions in a post-Soviet commons: Salmon fishing and reindeer herding in Kamchatka, Russia. Human Organization, 75(4), 336–345. doi:10.17730/1938-3525-75.4.336
- Irimoto, T. (2015). "If there is no culture, there is no history...": Traditional culture among northern Kamchatka reindeer herders in the post-Soviet period. Quaestio Rossica, (3), 227–242. doi:10.15826/qr.2015.3.120
- Jochelson, W. (1905–1908). The Koryak (Publications of the Jesup North Pacific Expedition, Vol. 6). E. J. Brill.
- King, A. D. (2011). Living with Koryak traditions: Playing with culture in Siberia. University of Nebraska Press.

=== Nenets ===
- Golovnev, A. V., & Osherenko, G. (1999). Siberian survival: The Nenets and their story. Cornell University Press.
- Stammler, F. (2005). Reindeer nomads meet the market: Culture, property and globalisation at the 'end of the land' (Halle Studies in the Anthropology of Eurasia, Vol. 6). LIT Verlag.
- Vallikivi, L. (2024). Words and silences: Nenets reindeer herders and Russian evangelical missionaries in the post-Soviet Arctic. Indiana University Press.

=== Nivkh ===
- Grant, B. (1995). In the Soviet house of culture: A century of perestroikas. Princeton University Press.
- Shternberg, L. (1999). The social organization of the Gilyak (B. Grant, Ed.). American Museum of Natural History; University of Washington Press.

=== Peoples of the Amur ===
- Bulgakova, T. (2013). Nanai shamanic culture in indigenous discourse. Kulturstiftung Sibirien.
- Lopatin, I. A. (1960). The cult of the dead among the natives of the Amur Basin (Central Asiatic Studies, Vol. 6). Mouton.

=== Sakha (Yakuts) ===
- Argounova-Low, T., & Brown, A. K. (2025). Narrative objects: Museums, the Sakha summer festival, and cultural revival in Siberia. Routledge. doi:10.4324/9780429456398
- Balzer, M. M., & Vinokurova, U. A. (1996). Nationalism, interethnic relations and federalism: The case of the Sakha Republic (Yakutia). Europe-Asia Studies, 48(1), 101–120. doi:10.1080/09668139608412335
- Crate, S. A. (2006). Cows, kin, and globalization: An ethnography of sustainability. AltaMira Press.
- Crate, S. A. (2021). Once upon the permafrost: Knowing culture and climate change in Siberia. University of Arizona Press.
- Ferguson, J. (2019). Words like birds: Sakha language discourses and practices in the city. University of Nebraska Press.
- Jochelson, W. (1933). The Yakut. Anthropological Papers of the American Museum of Natural History, 33(2), 35–225.
- Okladnikov, A. P. (1970). Yakutia before its incorporation into the Russian state (H. N. Michael, Ed.). McGill-Queen's University Press. (Note: Originally published in Russian as Okladnikov, A. P. (1955). Iakutiia do prisoedineniia k russkomu gosudarstvu [Yakutia before its incorporation into the Russian state]. Izdatel'stvo Akademii nauk SSSR.)
- Takakura, H. (2015). Arctic pastoralist Sakha: Ethnography of evolution and microadaptation in Siberia. Trans Pacific Press.

=== Siberian Tatars ===
- Frank, A. J. (1994). The Siberian chronicles and the Taybughid biys of Sibir' (Papers on Inner Asia, No. 15). Research Institute for Inner Asian Studies, Indiana University.
- Frank, A. J. (2000). Varieties of Islamization in Inner Asia: The case of the Baraba Tatars, 1740–1917. Cahiers du monde russe, 41(2–3), 245–262. doi:10.4000/monderusse.46

=== Tuvans and Khakas ===
- Levin, T., & Süzükei, V. (2006). Where rivers and mountains sing: Sound, music, and nomadism in Tuva and beyond. Indiana University Press.
- Mongush, M. V. (2006). Modern Tuvan identity. Inner Asia, 8(2), 275–296. doi:10.1163/146481706793646765
- Vainshtein, S. (1980). Nomads of south Siberia: The pastoral economies of Tuva (M. Colenso, Trans.; C. Humphrey, Ed.). Cambridge University Press. (Note: Originally published in Russian as Vainshtein, S. I. (1972). Istoricheskaia etnografiia tuvintsev: Problemy kochevogo khoziaistva [Historical ethnography of the Tuvans: Problems of nomadic economy]. Nauka.)
- Van Deusen, K. (2004). Singing story, healing drum: Shamans and storytellers of Turkic Siberia. McGill-Queen's University Press.

=== Yukaghirs ===
- Jochelson, W. (1926). The Yukaghir and the Yukaghirized Tungus (Publications of the Jesup North Pacific Expedition, Vol. 9). E. J. Brill.
- Willerslev, R. (2007). Soul hunters: Hunting, animism, and personhood among the Siberian Yukaghirs. University of California Press.

== Ethnic cleansing and genocide ==
=== Russian Empire ===
- Collins, D. N. (1982). Russia's conquest of Siberia: Evolving Russian and Soviet historical interpretations. European Studies Review, 12(1), 17–44. doi:10.1177/026569148201200102
- Collins, D. N. (2024). Subjugation and settlement in seventeenth and eighteenth-century Siberia. In A. Wood (Ed.), The history of Siberia: From Russian conquest to revolution (pp. 37–56). Routledge. doi:10.4324/9781003559641-3
- Forsyth, J. (2024). The Siberian native peoples before and after the Russian conquest. In A. Wood (Ed.), The history of Siberia: From Russian conquest to revolution (pp. 69–91). Routledge. doi:10.4324/9781003559641-5
- Gentes, A. A. (2017). The mass deportation of Poles to Siberia, 1863–1880. Palgrave Macmillan. doi:10.1007/978-3-319-60958-4
- Kivelson, V. (2015). Rivers of blood: Illustrating violence and virtue in Russia's early modern empire. Journal of the British Academy, 3, 69–105. doi:10.5871/jba/003.069
- Kudachinova, C. (2025). Scenes of starvation and survival cannibalism: Colonial food security and violence in seventeenth-century Siberia. Food and History, 23(1), 65–86. doi:10.1484/J.FOOD.5.145074
- Shentalinskaia, T. S. (2002). "Major Pavlutskii": From history to folklore. From the materials collected by the American North-Pacific Expedition. Folklorica, 7(1). doi:10.17161/folklorica.v7i1.3714

=== Soviet Union ===
- Chang, J. K., Lin, G. H., & Eiermann, K.-I. (2025). Battling for equality: East Asians in imperial and Soviet Russia and the Soviet Chinese deportation of 1937–39. Region: Regional Studies of Russia, Eastern Europe, and Central Asia, 14(1), 69–104. doi:10.1353/reg.2025.a971386
- Conquest, R. (1960). The Soviet deportation of nationalities. Macmillan. (Note: Later published as Conquest, R. (1970). The nation killers: The Soviet deportation of nationalities. Macmillan.)
- Davoliūtė, V., & Balkelis, T. (Eds.). (2018). Narratives of exile and identity: Soviet deportation memoirs from the Baltic states. Central European University Press. doi:10.1515/9789633861844
- Gelb, M. (1995). An early Soviet ethnic deportation: The Far-Eastern Koreans. Russian Review, 54(3), 389. JSTOR 131438
- Guchinova, E. (2022). Visible and invisible ethnicity: Native language and religiosity among the Kalmyks during the years of deportation, 1943–1956. Caucasus Survey, 11(1), 35–59. doi:10.30965/23761202-20220014
- Guchinova, E.-B. (2021). The politics of history in Russia and theatricalisation of traumatic events: The deportation of Kalmyks (1943–1956). Inner Asia, 23(2), 233–256. doi:10.1163/22105018-12340173
- Jolluck, K. R. (2002). Exile and identity: Polish women in the Soviet Union during World War II. University of Pittsburgh Press. JSTOR jj.11498443
- Kim, A. (2012). The repression of Soviet Koreans during the 1930s. The Historian, 74(2), 267–285. doi:10.1111/j.1540-6563.2012.00319.x
- Kim, A., Surzhik, M., & Mamychev, A. (2021). Soviet Koreans and Far Eastern NKVD in the 1930s. East Asia, 38(1), 93–103. doi:10.1007/s12140-020-09349-4
- Kirss, T. (2005). Survivorship and the eastern exile: Estonian women's life narratives of the 1941 and 1949 Siberian deportations. Journal of Baltic Studies, 36(1), 13–38. doi:10.1080/01629770400000221
- Koustova, E. (2015). (Un)returned from the Gulag: Life trajectories and integration of postwar special settlers. Kritika: Explorations in Russian and Eurasian History, 16(3), 589–620. doi:10.1353/kri.2015.0038
- Kreindler, I. (1986). The Soviet deported nationalities: A summary and an update. Soviet Studies, 38(3), 387–405. doi:10.1080/09668138608411648
- Krupnik, I., & Chlenov, M. (2007). The end of "Eskimo land": Yupik relocation in Chukotka, 1958–1959. Études/Inuit/Studies, 31(1–2), 59–81. doi:10.7202/019715ar
- Kurvet-Käosaar, L. (2003). Imagining an hospitable community in the deportation narratives of Baltic women. Prose Studies, 26(1–2), 59–78. doi:10.1080/0144035032000235819
- Kurvet-Käosaar, L. (2015). "Is that hunger haunting the stove?": Thematization of food in the deportation narratives of Baltic women. Journal of Baltic Studies, 46(3), 337–353. doi:10.1080/01629778.2015.1073951
- Laptander, R. (2014). Processes of remembering and forgetting: Tundra Nenets' reminiscences of the 1943 Mandalada rebellions. Sibirica, 13(3). doi:10.3167/sib.2014.130302
- Lazda, M. (2005). Women, nation, and survival: Latvian women in Siberia 1941–1957. Journal of Baltic Studies, 36(1), 1–12. doi:10.1080/01629770400000211
- Lebedeva, N. (2002). Deportations from Poland and the Baltic States to the USSR in 1939–1941: Common features and specific traits. Lithuanian Historical Studies, 7(1), 95–112. doi:10.30965/25386565-00701005
- Leete, A. (2009). The role of young people in resistance against the Soviet rule among the northern peoples in the 1930s–1940s. Folklore: Electronic Journal of Folklore, 41, 219–232. doi:10.7592/FEJF2009.41.leete
- Leete, A. (2023). Narratives of indigenous resistance in north-western Siberia in the 1930s. Suomen Antropologi, 47(3), 53–73. doi:10.30676/jfas.115574
- Martin, T. (1998). The origins of Soviet ethnic cleansing. Journal of Modern History, 70(4), 813–861. doi:10.1086/235168
- Matley, I. M. (1979). The dispersal of the Ingrian Finns. Slavic Review, 38(1), 1–16. JSTOR 2497223
- Mukhina, I. (2007). The Germans of the Soviet Union. Routledge. doi:10.4324/9780203963142
- Mukhina, I. (2014). Gendered division of labor among special settlers in the Soviet Union, 1941–1956. Women's History Review, 23(1), 99–119. doi:10.1080/09612025.2013.846114
- Naimark, N. M. (2010). Stalin's genocides. Princeton University Press. doi:10.1515/9781400836062
- Pohl, J. O. (1999). Ethnic cleansing in the USSR, 1937–1949 (Contributions to the Study of World History, No. 65). Greenwood Press.
- Pohl, J. O. (2016). The persecution of ethnic Germans in the USSR during World War II. Russian Review, 75(2), 284–303. doi:10.1111/russ.12075
- Pohl, J. O. (2022). The years of great silence: The deportation, special settlement, and mobilization into the labor army of ethnic Germans in the USSR, 1941–1955. ibidem-Verlag.
- Polian, P. (2004). Against their will: The history and geography of forced migrations in the USSR (A. Yastrzhembska, Trans.). Central European University Press. doi:10.1515/9786155053832 (Note: Originally published in Russian as Polian, P. (2001). Ne po svoei vole: Istoriia i geografiia prinuditel'nykh migratsii v SSSR. OGI Memorial.)
- Raskauskienė, A. (2014). Deportation, memory and the self in Dalia Grinkevičiūtė's memoirs A stolen youth, a stolen homeland and Lithuanians by the Laptev Sea. European Journal of Life Writing, 3, T1–T10. doi:10.5463/ejlw.3.17
- Siemaszko, Z. S. (1991). The mass deportations of the Polish population to the USSR, 1940–1941. In K. Sword (Ed.), The Soviet takeover of the Polish eastern provinces, 1939–41 (pp. 217–235). Macmillan. doi:10.1007/978-1-349-21379-5_12
- Statiev, A. (2009). Soviet ethnic deportations: Intent versus outcome. Journal of Genocide Research, 11(2–3), 243–264. doi:10.1080/14623520903118961
- Strods, H., & Kott, M. (2002). The file on operation "Priboi": A re-assessment of the mass deportations of 1949. Journal of Baltic Studies, 33(1), 1–36. doi:10.1080/01629770100000191
- Sword, K. (1994). Deportation and exile: Poles in the Soviet Union, 1939–48. St. Martin's Press.
- Taagepera, R. (1980). Soviet collectivization of Estonian agriculture: The deportation phase. Soviet Studies, 32(3), 379–397. doi:10.1080/09668138008411308
- Werth, N. (2010). Mass deportations, ethnic cleansing, and genocidal politics in the later Russian Empire and the USSR. In D. Bloxham & A. D. Moses (Eds.), The Oxford handbook of genocide studies. Oxford University Press. doi:10.1093/oxfordhb/9780199232116.013.0020
- Wróbel, P. J. (2014). Class war or ethnic cleansing? Soviet deportations of Polish citizens from the eastern provinces of Poland, 1939–1941. Polish Review, 59(2), 19–42. doi:10.5406/polishreview.59.2.0019

== Topical ==
=== Religion ===
- Bawden, C. R. (1985). Shamans, lamas and evangelicals: The English missionaries in Siberia. Routledge & Kegan Paul.
- Rygovskiy, D. (2025). Vernacular writings as a source of ethnographic knowledge on Chasovennye Old Believers in Eastern Siberia. Ethnologia Fennica, 52(2), 59–85. doi:10.23991/ef.146504
- Znamenski, A. A. (1999). Shamanism and Christianity: Native encounters with Russian Orthodox missions in Siberia and Alaska, 1820–1917. Greenwood Press.

=== Languages ===
- Anderson, G. D. S., & Harrison, K. D. (2020). Hunter-gatherers in South Siberia. In T. Güldemann, P. McConvell, & R. A. Rhodes (Eds.), The language of hunter-gatherers (pp. 499–520). Cambridge University Press. doi:10.1017/9781139026208.019
- Comrie, B. (1996). Language contact in northeastern Siberia (Chukotka and Kamchatka). In E. H. Jahr & I. Broch (Eds.), Language contact in the Arctic: Northern pidgins and contact languages (pp. 33–46). Mouton de Gruyter. doi:10.1515/9783110813302.33
- Däbritz, C. L. (2022). A grammar of Dolgan: A northern Siberian Turkic language of the Taimyr Peninsula. Brill. doi:10.1163/9789004516427
- Fortescue, M. (2005). Comparative Chukotko-Kamchatkan dictionary. Mouton de Gruyter. doi:10.1515/9783110925388
- Georg, S. (2007). A descriptive grammar of Ket (Yenisei-Ostyak): Introduction, phonology, morphology. Global Oriental. doi:10.1163/ej.9781901903584.i-328
- Maslova, E. (2003). A grammar of Kolyma Yukaghir. Mouton de Gruyter. doi:10.1515/9783110197174
- Matić, D. (2024). Language contact in north-eastern Siberia: An introduction. Journal of Language Contact, 17(1), 1–10. doi:10.1163/19552629-01701001
- Nikolaeva, I., & Tolskaya, M. (2001). A grammar of Udihe. Mouton de Gruyter. doi:10.1515/9783110849035
- Nikolaeva, I. (2014). A grammar of Tundra Nenets. Mouton de Gruyter. doi:10.1515/9783110320640
- Vajda, E. J. (2004). Ket (Languages of the World/Materials, No. 204). Lincom Europa.
- Wagner-Nagy, B. (2018). A grammar of Nganasan. Brill. doi:10.1163/9789004382763

=== Geography and environment ===
- Breyfogle, N. B. (2013). The fate of fishing in tsarist Russia: The human-fish nexus in Lake Baikal. Sibirica, 12(2), 1–29. doi:10.3167/sib.2013.120201
- Breyfogle, N. B. (2015). At the watershed: 1958 and the beginnings of Lake Baikal environmentalism. Slavonic and East European Review, 93(1), 147. doi:10.5699/slaveasteurorev2.93.1.0147
- Breyfogle, N. B. (Ed.). (2018). Eurasian environments: Nature and ecology in imperial Russian and Soviet history. University of Pittsburgh Press.
- Bruno, A. (2022). Tunguska: A Siberian mystery and its environmental legacy. Cambridge University Press.
- Jones, R. T. (2014). Empire of extinction: Russians and the North Pacific's strange beasts of the sea, 1741–1867. Oxford University Press.
- Josephson, P. R., Dronin, N., Mnatsakanian, R., Cherp, A., Efremenko, D., & Larin, V. (2013). An environmental history of Russia. Cambridge University Press.
- Josephson, P. R. (2014). The conquest of the Russian Arctic. Harvard University Press.
- Micklin, P. P. (1977). NAWAPA and two Siberian water-diversion proposals: A geographical comparison and appraisal. Soviet Geography, 18(2), 81–99. doi:10.1080/00385417.1977.10640160
- Micklin, P. P. (1986). The status of the Soviet Union's north–south water transfer projects before their abandonment in 1985–86. Soviet Geography, 27(5), 287–329. doi:10.1080/00385417.1986.10640648
- Newell, J. (2004). The Russian Far East: A reference guide for conservation and development (2nd ed.). Daniel & Daniel.
- Shiklomanov, N. I., Streletskiy, D. A., Swales, T. B., & Kokorev, V. A. (2017). Climate change and stability of urban infrastructure in Russian permafrost regions: Prognostic assessment based on GCM climate projections. Geographical Review, 107(1), 125–142. doi:10.1111/gere.12214
- Streletskiy, D. A., Suter, L. J., Shiklomanov, N. I., Porfiriev, B. N., & Eliseev, D. O. (2019). Assessment of climate change impacts on buildings, structures and infrastructure in the Russian regions on permafrost. Environmental Research Letters, 14(2), Article 025003. doi:10.1088/1748-9326/aaf5e6
- Suslov, S. P. (1961). Physical geography of Asiatic Russia (N. D. Gershevsky, Trans.; J. E. Williams, Ed.). W. H. Freeman. (Note: Originally published in Russian as Suslov, S. P. (1947). Fizicheskaia geografiia SSSR: Zapadnaia Sibir', Vostochnaia Sibir', Dal'nii Vostok, Sredniaia Aziia [Physical geography of the USSR: Western Siberia, Eastern Siberia, the Far East, Central Asia]. Gosudarstvennoe uchebno-pedagogicheskoe izdatel'stvo.)
- Weiner, D. R. (1999). A little corner of freedom: Russian nature protection from Stalin to Gorbachëv. University of California Press.

=== Economic development ===
- Bradshaw, M. J. (2010). A new energy age in Pacific Russia: Lessons from the Sakhalin oil and gas projects. Eurasian Geography and Economics, 51(3), 330–359. doi:10.2747/1539-7216.51.3.330
- Bradshaw, M. J. (Ed.). (2001). The Russian Far East and Pacific Asia: Unfulfilled potential. Curzon Press.
- Conolly, V. (1967). Beyond the Urals: Economic developments in Soviet Asia. Oxford University Press.
- Conolly, V. (1975). Siberia today and tomorrow: A study of economic resources, problems and achievements. Collins.
- Dibb, P. (1972). Siberia and the Pacific: A study of economic development and trade prospects. Praeger.
- Dienes, L., & Shabad, T. (1979). The Soviet energy system: Resource use and policies. V. H. Winston & Sons.
- Dienes, L. (1987). Regional planning and the development of Soviet Asia. Soviet Geography, 28(5), 287–314. doi:10.1080/00385417.1987.10640686
- Dienes, L. (1991). Siberia: Perestroyka and economic development. Soviet Geography, 32(7), 445–457. doi:10.1080/00385417.1991.10640868
- Dienes, L. (2002). Reflections on a geographic dichotomy: Archipelago Russia. Eurasian Geography and Economics, 43(6), 443–458. doi:10.2747/1538-7216.43.6.443
- Hill, F., & Gaddy, C. G. (2003). The Siberian curse: How communist planners left Russia out in the cold. Brookings Institution Press.
- Jensen, R. G., Shabad, T., & Wright, A. W. (Eds.). (1983). Soviet natural resources in the world economy. University of Chicago Press.
- North, R. N. (1972). Soviet northern development: The case of NW Siberia. Soviet Studies, 24(2), 171–199. doi:10.1080/09668137208410855
- Orttung, R. W. (Ed.). (2016). Sustaining Russia's Arctic cities: Resource politics, migration, and climate change. Berghahn Books.
- Rodgers, A. (Ed.). (1990). The Soviet Far East: Geographical perspectives on development. Routledge.
- Sagers, M. J. (1995). Prospects for oil and gas development in Russia's Sakhalin Oblast. Post-Soviet Geography, 36(5), 274–290. doi:10.1080/10605851.1995.10640993
- Wood, A., & French, R. A. (Eds.). (1989). The development of Siberia: People and resources. Macmillan.
- Wood, A. (Ed.). (1987). Siberia: Problems and prospects for regional development. Croom Helm.

=== Transportation ===
- Mote, V. L. (1984). Containerization and the Trans-Siberian land bridge. Geographical Review, 74(3), 304. JSTOR 214941
- Mote, V. L. (1990). BAM, boom, bust: Analysis of a railway's past, present, and future. Soviet Geography, 31(5), 321–331. doi:10.1080/00385417.1990.10640832
- North, R. N. (1979). Transport in western Siberia: Tsarist and Soviet development. University of British Columbia Press.
- Shabad, T., & Mote, V. L. (1977). Gateway to Siberian resources (the BAM). Scripta Publishing.
- Ward, C. J. (2009). Brezhnev's folly: The building of BAM and late Soviet socialism. University of Pittsburgh Press.

=== Population and settlement ===
- Heleniak, T. E. (1999). Out-migration and depopulation of the Russian north during the 1990s. Post-Soviet Geography and Economics, 40(3), 155–205. doi:10.1080/10889388.1999.10641111
- Heleniak, T. E. (2009). The role of attachment to place in migration decisions of the population of the Russian north. Polar Geography, 32(1–2), 31–60. doi:10.1080/10889370903000398
- Heleniak, T. E. (2020). Where did all the men go? The changing sex composition of the Russian north in the post-Soviet period, 1989–2010. Polar Record, 56, Article e18. doi:10.1017/S0032247419000615
- Kalemeneva, E. (2025). "The Thaw" in the Arctic: Constructing Mirny as a Soviet Arctic city of a new type. Urban History, 52(2), 283–300. doi:10.1017/S0963926824000026
- Round, J. (2005). Rescaling Russia's geography: The challenges of depopulating the northern periphery. Europe-Asia Studies, 57(5), 705–727. doi:10.1080/09668130500126494

=== Literature ===
- Chernetsky, V. (2017). The unusual case of Fr. Sergei Kruglov: Poet, priest, and postmodernist in post-Soviet Siberia. Russian Literature, 87–89, 375–405. doi:10.1016/j.ruslit.2017.04.014
- Gillespie, D. C. (1986). Valentin Rasputin and Soviet Russian village prose (MHRA Texts and Dissertations, Vol. 22). Modern Humanities Research Association.

== Primary sources ==
=== Documents and collections ===
- Applebaum, A. (Ed.). (2011). Gulag voices: An anthology (Annals of Communism). Yale University Press.
- Armstrong, T. (Ed.). (1975). Yermak's campaign in Siberia: A selection of documents (T. Minorsky & D. Wileman, Trans.). Hakluyt Society.
- Dmytryshyn, B., Crownhart-Vaughan, E. A. P., & Vaughan, T. (Eds. & Trans.). (1985). Russia's conquest of Siberia, 1558–1700: A documentary record (To Siberia and Russian America: Three centuries of Russian eastward expansion, Vol. 1). Western Imprints, The Press of the Oregon Historical Society.
- Znamenski, A. A. (2003). Shamanism in Siberia: Russian records of indigenous spirituality. Springer Netherlands.

=== Exploration and scientific reports ===
- Krasheninnikov, S. P. (1972). Explorations of Kamchatka: North Pacific scimitar (E. A. P. Crownhart-Vaughan, Trans.). Oregon Historical Society. (Note: Originally published in Russian as Krasheninnikov, S. P. (1755). Opisanie zemli Kamchatki [Description of the land of Kamchatka]. Imperial Academy of Sciences.)
- Müller, G. F. (1986). Bering's voyages: The reports from Russia (C. Urness, Trans.). University of Alaska Press. (Note: A translation of Müller's Nachrichten von Seereisen.)
- Steller, G. W. (1988). Journal of a voyage with Bering, 1741–1742 (M. A. Engel & O. W. Frost, Trans.; O. W. Frost, Ed.). Stanford University Press. doi:10.1515/9781503621459
- Steller, G. W. (2003). Steller's history of Kamchatka: Collected information concerning the history of Kamchatka, its peoples, their manners, names, lifestyles, and various customary practices (M. Engel & K. Willmore, Trans.; M. W. Falk, Ed.) (Rasmuson Library Historical Translation Series, Vol. 12). University of Alaska Press.

=== Exile, prison and Gulag accounts ===
- Avvakum. (1979). Archpriest Avvakum: The life written by himself (K. N. Brostrom, Trans.) (Michigan Slavic Translations, No. 4). Michigan Slavic Publications. (Note: A translation of Zhitie protopopa Avvakuma, im samim napisannoe.)
- Bardach, J., & Gleeson, K. (1998). Man is wolf to man: Surviving the Gulag. University of California Press. doi:10.1525/9780520924055
- Chekhov, A. P. (2007). Sakhalin Island (B. Reeve, Trans.). Oneworld Classics. (Note: Originally published in Russian as Chekhov, A. P. (1895). Ostrov Sakhalin [Sakhalin Island].)
- Dostoevsky, F. (1965). Memoirs from the house of the dead (J. Coulson, Trans.). Oxford University Press. (Note: A translation of Zapiski iz mertvogo doma.)
- Ginzburg, E. (1981). Within the whirlwind (I. Boland, Trans.). Harcourt Brace Jovanovich. (Note: A translation of Krutoi marshrut, volume 2; the sequel to Journey into the whirlwind.)
- Grinkevičiūtė, D. (2018). Shadows on the tundra. Peirene Press.
- Kennan, G. (1891). Siberia and the exile system (Vols. 1–2). The Century Company.
- Lipper, E. (1951). Eleven years in Soviet prison camps (R. Winston & C. Winston, Trans.). Regnery. (Note: Originally published in German as Lipper, E. (1950). Elf Jahre in sowjetischen Gefängnissen und Lagern. Oprecht.)
- Petrov, V. (1949). Soviet gold: My life as a slave laborer in the Siberian mines (M. Ginsburg, Trans.). Farrar, Straus.
- Shalamov, V. (2018). Kolyma stories (D. Rayfield, Trans.). New York Review Books. (Note: Translated from Shalamov's Sobranie sochinenii [Collected works] (TERRA-Knizhnyi klub, 2013). An earlier English translation of selected stories by John Glad appeared as Kolyma tales (W. W. Norton, 1980).)
- Solzhenitsyn, A. (1974–1978). The Gulag Archipelago, 1918–1956: An experiment in literary investigation (T. P. Whitney & H. Willetts, Trans.; Vols. 1–3). Harper & Row. (Note: Originally published in Russian as Solzhenitsyn, A. (1973). Arkhipelag GULag, 1918–1956: Opyt khudozhestvennogo issledovaniia. YMCA-Press. Volumes 1–2 of the English edition were translated by Thomas P. Whitney, volume 3 by Harry Willetts.)

=== Travel accounts ===
- Arsenyev, V. K. (2016). Across the Ussuri Kray: Travels in the Sikhote-Alin Mountains (J. C. Slaght, Trans.). Indiana University Press. (Note: A translation of Arsen'ev's Po Ussuriiskomu kraiu [Through the Ussuri region].)
- Atkinson, T. W. (1858). Oriental and western Siberia: A narrative of seven years' explorations and adventures in Siberia, Mongolia, the Kirghis steppes, Chinese Tartary, and part of Central Asia. Hurst & Blackett.
- Cochrane, J. D. (1824). Narrative of a pedestrian journey through Russia and Siberian Tartary, from the frontiers of China to the Frozen Sea and Kamtchatka (Vols. 1–2). C. Knight.
- Frazier, I. (2010). Travels in Siberia. Farrar, Straus and Giroux.
- Kennan, G. (1870). Tent life in Siberia, and adventures among the Koraks and other tribes in Kamtchatka and northern Asia. G. P. Putnam & Sons. (Note: The review cited is of the 1910 new edition published by G. P. Putnam's Sons.)
- Lansdell, H. (1882). Through Siberia (Vols. 1–2). S. Low, Marston, Searle and Rivington.
- Nansen, F. (1914). Through Siberia: The land of the future (A. G. Chater, Trans.). William Heinemann. (Note: A translation of Nansen's Gjennem Sibirien.)
- Rasputin, V. (1996). Siberia, Siberia (M. Winchell & G. Mikkelson, Trans.). Northwestern University Press. (Note: Originally published in Russian as Rasputin, V. G. (1991). Sibir', Sibir'... Molodaia gvardiia.)
- Thubron, C. (1999). In Siberia. Chatto & Windus.

== Academic journals ==
Below are some academic journals related to the subject:

== See also ==
- History of Siberia
- Indigenous peoples of Siberia
- Russian conquest of Siberia
- Russian Far East
- Siberian regionalism
