= Pridorozhnoye, Romnensky District, Amur Oblast =

Pridorozhnoye Придорожное
- Selo
- Location within Amur Oblast Location within Russia
- Coordinates: 50°51′N 129°26′E
- Country: Russia
- Region: Amur Oblast
- District: Romnensky District
- Time zone: UTC+9:00

Pridorozhnoye (Russian: Придорожное) is a rural locality (a selo) in Chergalinsky Selsoviet of Romnensky District, Amur Oblast, Russia. The population was 42 as of 2018. There is 1 street.

== Geography ==
Pridorozhnoye is located on the right bank of the Gorbyl River, 24 km northeast of Romny (the district's administrative centre) by road. Smolyanoye is the nearest rural locality.
