= Bibliography of the history of Iceland =

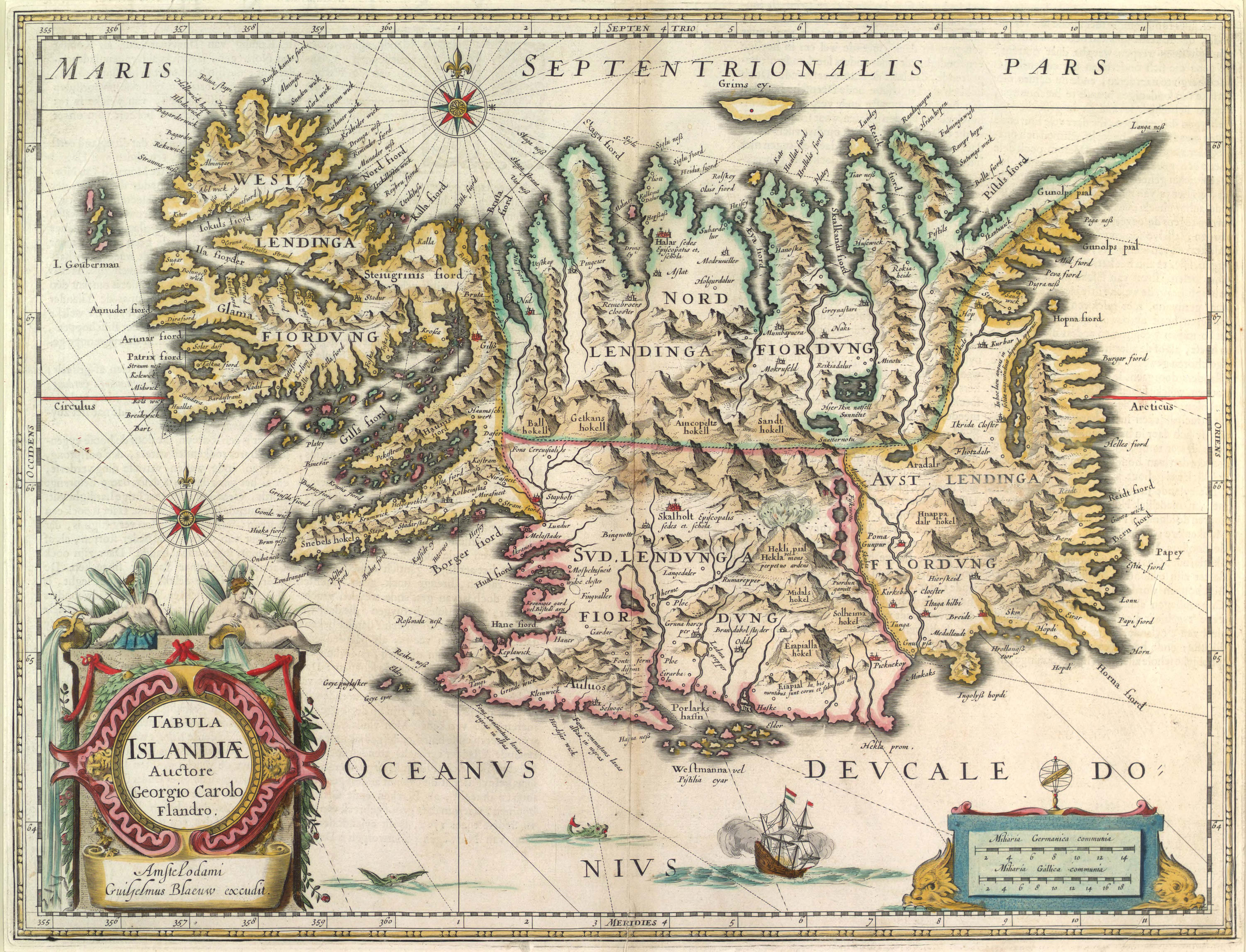
- Map of Iceland by Willem Blaeu, 1630
- Subject: History of Iceland
- Scope: Books, journal articles
- Period covered: Settlement to the present
- Languages: English
- Related: Althing; Cod Wars; Icelandic Commonwealth; Sagas of Icelanders; Settlement of Iceland
- Related bibliographies: Bibliography of Greenland

This is a select bibliography of academic level books and journal articles about the history of Iceland, from the settlement of the island in the Viking Age to the present.

Iceland is an island country in the North Atlantic. Its national parliament, the Althing, met in the open air at Þingvellir from about 930. The Icelandic Commonwealth ended when Icelanders submitted to the Norwegian king under the Old Covenant of 1262–1264, and toward the end of the 14th century Norway and Iceland passed under the Danish monarchy. Home rule and parliamentary government were granted by a constitutional amendment confirmed in 1903, and the first Icelandic minister was appointed in 1904. Iceland became a sovereign state in personal union with Denmark under the Act of Union of 1918 and was established as a republic at a session of the Althing held at Þingvellir on June 17, 1944.

Bibliography contains academic level English language books (including translations) and journal articles, published mainly post World War II. (Note: Works published before World War II should be limited to areas where there are no significant post-World War II books on the subject or when the work in question has significant historical merit.) Book entries may have references to reviews published in academic journals or major newspapers and magazines when these could be considered helpful. These reference reviews also function as a resource to find other works on this subject.

Works listed here are cited in the notes or bibliographies of scholarly sources. Each is published by an academic or major trade press, written by a recognized expert, or substantially reviewed in scholarly journals; borderline cases are omitted. A selection of primary sources is included. Many of the books below carry their own bibliographies; see Further reading section for longer ones, and External links section for museums, archives and academic institutes.

Citations follow APA style. (Note: Entries are in plain text APA 7 format; templates are used only for identifiers, reviews and notes.) Books have citations to academic journal or mainstream published reviews when available. For books only partly about the subject, give relevant chapter or section titles where useful and available. Translators of the original-language edition are included when possible.

== General histories ==
- Durrenberger, E. P., & Pálsson, G. (Eds.). (1989). The anthropology of Iceland. University of Iowa Press. JSTOR j.ctt20fw942
- Gjerset, K. (1924). History of Iceland. Macmillan.
- Jóhannesson, G. T. (2013). The history of Iceland. ABC-CLIO. doi:10.5040/9798400664885
- Karlsson, G. (2001). Iceland's 1100 years: The history of a marginal society. Hurst.
- Lacy, T. G. (1998). Ring of seasons: Iceland, its culture and history. University of Michigan Press. doi:10.3998/mpub.15488
- Magnússon, S. G. (2010). Wasteland with words: A social history of Iceland. Reaktion Books.
- Oslund, K. (2011). Iceland imagined: Nature, culture, and storytelling in the North Atlantic. University of Washington Press. doi:10.1515/9780295802992

== Chronological ==
=== Settlement and the Commonwealth (870–1262) ===
- Byock, J. L. (1982). Feud in the Icelandic saga. University of California Press. doi:10.1525/9780520341012
- Byock, J. L. (1988). Medieval Iceland: Society, sagas, and power. University of California Press.
- Byock, J. L. (2001). Viking age Iceland. Penguin Books.
- Callow, C. (2020). Landscape, tradition and power in medieval Iceland: Dalir and the Eyjafjörður region c.870–c.1265. Brill. doi:10.1163/9789004331600
- Gelsinger, B. E. (1981). Icelandic enterprise: Commerce and economy in the Middle Ages. University of South Carolina Press.
- Hastrup, K. (1985). Culture and history in medieval Iceland: An anthropological analysis of structure and change. Clarendon Press.
- Jakobsson, S. (2009). The process of state-formation in medieval Iceland. Viator, 40(2), 151–170. doi:10.1484/j.viator.1.100426
- Jakobsson, S. (2019). Conversion and cultural memory in medieval Iceland. Church History, 88(1), 1–26. doi:10.1017/s0009640719000507
- Jakobsson, S. (2024). Medieval Iceland: Politics, patronage and power. Routledge. doi:10.4324/9781003324331
- Jóhannesson, J. (1974). A history of the old Icelandic commonwealth: Islendinga saga (H. Bessason, Trans.). University of Manitoba Press. doi:10.1515/9780887553318
- Kristinsson, A. (2003). Lords and literature: The Icelandic sagas as political and social instruments. Scandinavian Journal of History, 28(1), 1–17. doi:10.1080/03468750310001192
- Miller, W. I. (1990). Bloodtaking and peacemaking: Feud, law, and society in saga Iceland. University of Chicago Press. doi:10.7208/chicago/9780226526829.001.0001
- Sigurðsson, J. V. (2017). Viking friendship: The social bond in Iceland and Norway, c. 900–1300. Cornell University Press. doi:10.7591/9781501708480
- Smith, K. P. (1995). Landnám: The settlement of Iceland in archaeological and historical perspective. World Archaeology, 26(3), 319–347. doi:10.1080/00438243.1995.9980280
- Vésteinsson, O. (2000). The Christianization of Iceland: Priests, power, and social change 1000–1300. Oxford University Press. doi:10.1093/acprof:oso/9780198207993.001.0001

=== Norwegian and Danish rule (1262–1800) ===
- Hastrup, K. (1990). Nature and policy in Iceland 1400–1800: An anthropological analysis of history and mentality. Oxford University Press. doi:10.1093/oso/9780198277286.001.0001
- Vasey, D. E. (1991). Population, agriculture, and famine: Iceland, 1784–1785. Human Ecology, 19(3), 323–350. doi:10.1007/bf00888981
- Vasey, D. E. (1996). Population regulation, ecology, and political economy in preindustrial Iceland. American Ethnologist, 23(2), 366–392. doi:10.1525/ae.1996.23.2.02a00100
- Wieners, C. E., & Hálfdanarson, G. (2024). "More poison than words can describe": What did people die of after the 1783 Laki eruption in Iceland? Natural Hazards and Earth System Sciences, 24(9), 2971–2994. doi:10.5194/nhess-24-2971-2024

=== Nationalism and independence (1800–1944) ===
- Gunnlaugsson, G. Á. (1988). Family and household in Iceland 1801–1930: Studies in the relationship between demographic and socio-economic development, social legislation and family and household structures. Acta Universitatis Upsaliensis.
- Hálfdanarson, G. (1995). Social distinctions and national unity: On politics of nationalism in nineteenth-century Iceland. History of European Ideas, 21(6), 763–779. doi:10.1016/0191-6599(95)00068-2
- Hálfdanarson, G. (2000). Iceland: A peaceful secession. Scandinavian Journal of History, 25(1–2), 87–100. doi:10.1080/03468750050115609
- Hálfdanarson, G. (2006). Severing the ties: Iceland's journey from a union with Denmark to a nation-state. Scandinavian Journal of History, 31(3–4), 237–254. doi:10.1080/03468750600930878
- Thor, J. (2002). Icelanders in North America: The first settlers. University of Manitoba Press. doi:10.1515/9780887553257

=== Modern Iceland (1944–present) ===
- Bergmann, E. (2014). Iceland and the international financial crisis: Boom, bust and recovery. Palgrave Macmillan. doi:10.1057/9781137332004
- Ingimundarson, V. (2012). Britain, the United States and the militarization of Iceland 1945–1951. Scandinavian Journal of History, 37(2), 198–220. doi:10.1080/03468755.2012.666721
- Jóhannesson, G. T. (2004). How "cod war" came: The origins of the Anglo-Icelandic fisheries dispute, 1958–61. Historical Research, 77(198), 543–574. doi:10.1111/j.1468-2281.2004.00222.x
- Jónsson, H. (1982). Friends in conflict: The Anglo-Icelandic cod wars and the law of the sea. C. Hurst.
- Pálsson, G., & Durrenberger, E. P. (Eds.). (1996). Images of contemporary Iceland: Everyday lives and global contexts. University of Iowa Press. JSTOR j.ctt20h6v55
- Steinsson, S. (2016). The Cod Wars: A re-analysis. European Security, 25(2), 256–275. doi:10.1080/09662839.2016.1160376
- Thorhallsson, B. (Ed.). (2018). Small states and shelter theory: Iceland's external affairs. Routledge. doi:10.4324/9780429463167
- Wade, R. H., & Sigurgeirsdottir, S. (2012). Iceland's rise, fall, stabilisation and beyond. Cambridge Journal of Economics, 36(1), 127–144. doi:10.1093/cje/ber038

== Biographies ==
- Ciklamini, M. (1978). Snorri Sturluson. Twayne Publishers.
- Hogan, J. F. (1891). The convict king: Being the life and adventures of Jorgen Jorgenson, monarch of Iceland, naval captain, revolutionist, British diplomatic agent, author, dramatist, preacher, political prisoner, gambler, hospital dispenser, continental traveller, explorer, editor, expatriated exile, and colonial constable. Ward & Downey.
- Wanner, K. J. (2008). Snorri Sturluson and the Edda: The conversion of cultural capital in medieval Scandinavia. University of Toronto Press. doi:10.3138/9781442689152

== Reference works ==
- Clover, C. J., & Lindow, J. (Eds.). (1985). Old Norse-Icelandic literature: A critical guide. Cornell University Press. doi:10.7591/9781501741654
- Jakobsson, Á., & Jakobsson, S. (Eds.). (2017). The Routledge research companion to the medieval Icelandic sagas. Routledge. doi:10.4324/9781315613628
- Jakobsson, S., & Hálfdanarson, G. (2016). Historical dictionary of Iceland (3rd ed.). Rowman & Littlefield. doi:10.5771/9781442262911
- McTurk, R. (Ed.). (2005). A companion to Old Norse-Icelandic literature and culture. Blackwell. doi:10.1002/9780470996867
- O'Donoghue, H., & Parker, E. (Eds.). (2024). The Cambridge history of Old Norse-Icelandic literature. Cambridge University Press. doi:10.1017/9781108762618

== Primary sources ==
- Dennis, A., Foote, P., & Perkins, R. (Trans.). (1980). Laws of early Iceland: Gragas I. University of Manitoba Press. doi:10.1515/9780887553332
- Dennis, A., & Foote, P. (Trans.). (2000). Laws of early Iceland: Gragas II. University of Manitoba Press. doi:10.1515/9780887553349
- Grønlie, S. (Trans.). (2006). Íslendingabók; Kristni saga: The book of the Icelanders; The story of the conversion. Viking Society for Northern Research.
- Henderson, E. (1818). Iceland; or, the journal of a residence in that island, during the years 1814 and 1815. Oliphant, Waugh and Innes.
- McGrew, J. H. (Trans.). (1970). Sturlunga saga: Vol. 1. The saga of Hvamm-Sturla and the saga of the Icelanders. Twayne Publishers; American-Scandinavian Foundation.

== See also ==
- Althing
- Bibliography of Greenland
- History of Iceland
- Outline of Iceland
- Sagas of Icelanders
