= Tambovka, Amur Oblast =

Rural locality in Amur Oblast, Russia

Coordinates: 50.10°N 128.06°E

Tambovka (Russian: Тамбо́вка) is a rural locality (a selo) and the administrative center of Tambovsky District of Amur Oblast, Russia. Population: 76,173 (2010 census); 8,147 (2002 census); 8,828 (1989 Soviet census).
