= Tambovsky District, Amur Oblast =

Tambovsky District Тамбовский район (Russian)
- District
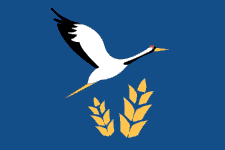
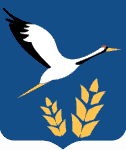
- Flag Coat of arms
- Location of Tambovsky District in Amur Oblast
- Coordinates: 50°06′N 128°03′E
- Country: Russia
- Federal subject: Amur Oblast
- Established: 4 January 1926
- Administrative center: Tambovka

Area
  - Total: 2,539 km^{2} (980 sq mi)

Population (2010 Census)
  - Total: 22,671
  - Density: 8.929/km^{2} (23.13/sq mi)
  - Urban: 0%
  - Rural: 100%

Administrative structure
  - Administrative divisions: 11 Rural settlements
  - Inhabited localities: 27 rural localities

Municipal structure
  - Municipally incorporated as: Tambovsky Municipal District
  - Municipal divisions: 0 urban settlements, 11 rural settlements
- Time zone: UTC+9 (MSK+6)
- OKTMO ID: 10651000
- Website: http://www.tambr.ru

Tambovsky District (Russian: Тамбо́вский райо́н) is an administrative and municipal district (raion), one of the twenty in Amur Oblast, Russia. The area of the district is 2,539 square kilometers (980 sq mi). Its administrative center is the rural locality (a selo) of Tambovka. Population: 22,671 (2010 Census); 25,049 (2002 Census); 25,683 (1989 Soviet census). The population of Tambovka accounts for 33.6% of the district's total population.
