= Petropavlovka, Russia =

Petropavlovka (Russian: Петропа́вловка) is the name of several rural localities in Russia.

== Amur Oblast ==
As of 2010, four rural localities in Amur Oblast bear this name:

- Petropavlovka, Arkharinsky District, Amur Oblast, a selo in Chernigovsky Rural Settlement of Arkharinsky District
- Petropavlovka, Ivanovsky District, Amur Oblast, a selo in Petropavlovsky Rural Settlement of Ivanovsky District
- Petropavlovka, Mikhaylovsky District, Amur Oblast, a selo in Mikhaylovsky Rural Settlement of Mikhaylovsky District
- Petropavlovka, Svobodnensky District, Amur Oblast, a selo in Petropavlovsky Rural Settlement of Svobodnensky District

== Astrakhan Oblast ==
As of 2010, one rural locality in Astrakhan Oblast bears this name:

- Petropavlovka, Astrakhan Oblast, a selo in Baranovsky Selsoviet of Narimanovsky District

== Republic of Bashkortostan ==
As of 2010, eight rural localities in the Republic of Bashkortostan bear this name:

- Petropavlovka, Arkhangelsky District, Republic of Bashkortostan, a village in Bakaldinsky Selsoviet of Arkhangelsky District
- Petropavlovka, Askinsky District, Republic of Bashkortostan, a village in Petropavlovsky Selsoviet of Askinsky District
- Petropavlovka, Gafuriysky District, Republic of Bashkortostan, a village in Burunovsky Selsoviet of Gafuriysky District
- Petropavlovka, Kugarchinsky District, Republic of Bashkortostan, a village in Nizhnebikkuzinsky Selsoviet of Kugarchinsky District
- Petropavlovka, Meleuzovsky District, Republic of Bashkortostan, a village in Denisovsky Selsoviet of Meleuzovsky District
- Petropavlovka, Miyakinsky District, Republic of Bashkortostan, a village in Kacheganovsky Selsoviet of Miyakinsky District
- Petropavlovka, Sterlitamaksky District, Republic of Bashkortostan, a village in Burikazganovsky Selsoviet of Sterlitamaksky District
- Petropavlovka, Tatyshlinsky District, Republic of Bashkortostan, a village in Kalmiyarovsky Selsoviet of Tatyshlinsky District

== Belgorod Oblast ==
As of 2010, two rural localities in Belgorod Oblast bear this name:

- Petropavlovka, Belgorodsky District, Belgorod Oblast, a selo in Belgorodsky District
- Petropavlovka, Chernyansky District, Belgorod Oblast, a selo in Chernyansky District

== Republic of Buryatia ==
As of 2010, three rural localities in the Republic of Buryatia bear this name:

- Petropavlovka, Bichursky District, Republic of Buryatia, a selo in Gochitsky Selsoviet of Bichursky District
- Petropavlovka, Dzhidinsky District, Republic of Buryatia, a selo in Petropavlovsky Selsoviet of Dzhidinsky District
- Petropavlovka, Zaigrayevsky District, Republic of Buryatia, a selo in Pervomayevsky Selsoviet of Zaigrayevsky District

== Chelyabinsk Oblast ==
As of 2010, two rural localities in Chelyabinsk Oblast bear this name:

- Petropavlovka, Kusinsky District, Chelyabinsk Oblast, a selo in Petropavlovsky Selsoviet of Kusinsky District
- Petropavlovka, Uysky District, Chelyabinsk Oblast, a selo in Petropavlovsky Selsoviet of Uysky District

== Kemerovo Oblast ==
As of 2010, one rural locality in Kemerovo Oblast bears this name:

- Petropavlovka, Kemerovo Oblast, a village under the administrative jurisdiction of the urban-type settlement of Verkh-Chebula in Chebulinsky District

== Khabarovsk Krai ==
As of 2010, one rural locality in Khabarovsk Krai bears this name:

- Petropavlovka, Khabarovsk Krai, a selo in Khabarovsky District

== Krasnoyarsk Krai ==
As of 2010, six rural localities in Krasnoyarsk Krai bear this name:

- Petropavlovka, Abansky District, Krasnoyarsk Krai, a selo in Petropavlovsky Selsoviet of Abansky District
- Petropavlovka, Balakhtinsky District, Krasnoyarsk Krai, a selo in Petropavlovsky Selsoviet of Balakhtinsky District
- Petropavlovka, Kuraginsky District, Krasnoyarsk Krai, a village in Cheremshansky Selsoviet of Kuraginsky District
- Petropavlovka, Pirovsky District, Krasnoyarsk Krai, a village in Bushuysky Selsoviet of Pirovsky District
- Petropavlovka, Sayansky District, Krasnoyarsk Krai, a village in Bolsheilbinsky Selsoviet of Sayansky District
- Petropavlovka, Yemelyanovsky District, Krasnoyarsk Krai, a village in Mikhaylovsky Selsoviet of Yemelyanovsky District

== Kursk Oblast ==
As of 2010, two rural localities in Kursk Oblast bear this name:

- Petropavlovka, Medvensky District, Kursk Oblast, a selo in Amosovsky Selsoviet of Medvensky District
- Petropavlovka, Sovetsky District, Kursk Oblast, a village in Gorodishchensky Selsoviet of Sovetsky District

== Lipetsk Oblast ==
As of 2010, two rural localities in Lipetsk Oblast bear this name:

- Petropavlovka, Dankovsky District, Lipetsk Oblast, a village in Voskresensky Selsoviet of Dankovsky District
- Petropavlovka, Terbunsky District, Lipetsk Oblast, a village in Kurgano-Golovinsky Selsoviet of Terbunsky District

== Mari El Republic ==
As of 2010, one rural locality in the Mari El Republic bears this name:

- Petropavlovka, Mari El Republic, a village in Alexeyevsky Rural Okrug of Sovetsky District

== Moscow Oblast ==
As of 2010, one rural locality in Moscow Oblast bears this name:

- Petropavlovka, Moscow Oblast, a village in Stremilovskoye Rural Settlement of Chekhovsky District

== Novosibirsk Oblast ==
As of 2010, three rural localities in Novosibirsk Oblast bear this name:

- Petropavlovka, Krasnozyorsky District, Novosibirsk Oblast, a selo in Krasnozyorsky District
- Petropavlovka (Kupinsky District), Novosibirsk Oblast, a village in Kupinsky District
- Petropavlovka, Maslyaninsky District, Novosibirsk Oblast, a selo in Maslyaninsky District

== Omsk Oblast ==
As of 2010, two rural localities in Omsk Oblast bear this name:

- Petropavlovka, Nizhneomsky District, Omsk Oblast, a village in Novotroitsky Rural Okrug of Nizhneomsky District
- Petropavlovka, Sedelnikovsky District, Omsk Oblast, a village in Ragozinsky Rural Okrug of Sedelnikovsky District

== Orenburg Oblast ==
As of 2010, two rural localities in Orenburg Oblast bear this name:

- Petropavlovka, Krasnogvardeysky District, Orenburg Oblast, a village in Kinzelsky Selsoviet of Krasnogvardeysky District
- Petropavlovka, Sakmarsky District, Orenburg Oblast, a selo in Nikolsky Selsoviet of Sakmarsky District

== Samara Oblast ==
As of 2010, two rural localities in Samara Oblast bear this name:

- Petropavlovka, Klyavlinsky District, Samara Oblast, a village in Klyavlinsky District
- Petropavlovka, Yelkhovsky District, Samara Oblast, a selo in Yelkhovsky District

== Saratov Oblast ==
As of 2010, four rural localities in Saratov Oblast bear this name:

- Petropavlovka, Dergachyovsky District, Saratov Oblast, a selo in Dergachyovsky District
- Petropavlovka, Lysogorsky District, Saratov Oblast, a selo in Lysogorsky District
- Petropavlovka, Novouzensky District, Saratov Oblast, a selo in Novouzensky District
- Petropavlovka, Rtishchevsky District, Saratov Oblast, a selo in Rtishchevsky District

== Smolensk Oblast ==
As of 2010, one rural locality in Smolensk Oblast bears this name:

- Petropavlovka, Smolensk Oblast, a village in Glinkovskoye Rural Settlement of Glinkovsky District

== Stavropol Krai ==
As of 2010, one rural locality in Stavropol Krai bears this name:

- Petropavlovka, Stavropol Krai, a selo in Kazinsky Selsoviet of Shpakovsky District

== Republic of Tatarstan ==
As of 2010, one rural locality in the Republic of Tatarstan bears this name:

- Petropavlovka, Republic of Tatarstan, a village in Leninogorsky District

== Tomsk Oblast ==
As of 2010, one rural locality in Tomsk Oblast bears this name:

- Petropavlovka, Tomsk Oblast, a selo in Tomsky District

== Tyumen Oblast ==
As of 2010, three rural localities in Tyumen Oblast bear this name:

- Petropavlovka, Sorokinsky District, Tyumen Oblast, a village in Pokrovsky Rural Okrug of Sorokinsky District
- Petropavlovka, Uporovsky District, Tyumen Oblast, a village in Bunkovsky Rural Okrug of Uporovsky District
- Petropavlovka, Yarkovsky District, Tyumen Oblast, a village in Shchetkovsky Rural Okrug of Yarkovsky District

== Volgograd Oblast ==
As of 2010, one rural locality in Volgograd Oblast bears this name:

- Petropavlovka, Volgograd Oblast, a selo in Maloivanovsky Selsoviet of Dubovsky District

== Voronezh Oblast ==
As of 2010, five rural localities in Voronezh Oblast bear this name:

- Petropavlovka, Liskinsky District, Voronezh Oblast, a selo in Petropavlovskoye Rural Settlement of Liskinsky District
- Petropavlovka, Novousmansky District, Voronezh Oblast, a settlement in Rozhdestvensko-Khavskoye Rural Settlement of Novousmansky District
- Petropavlovka, Ostrogozhsky District, Voronezh Oblast, a selo in Petropavlovskoye Rural Settlement of Ostrogozhsky District
- Petropavlovka, Petropavlovsky District, Voronezh Oblast, a selo in Petropavlovskoye Rural Settlement of Petropavlovsky District
- Petropavlovka, Podgorensky District, Voronezh Oblast, a khutor in Skororybskoye Rural Settlement of Podgorensky District
