= Musino, Kugarchinsky District, Republic of Bashkortostan =

Musino Мусино
- Village
- Location within Bashkortostan Location within Russia
- Coordinates: 52°38′N 56°31′E
- Country: Russia
- Region: Bashkortostan
- District: Kugarchinsky District
- Time zone: UTC+5:00

Musino (Russian: Мусино; Bashkir: Муса, Musa) is a rural locality (a village) in Novopetrovsky Selsoviet, Kugarchinsky District, Bashkortostan, Russia. The population was 103 as of 2010. There are 2 streets.

== Geography ==
Musino is located 14 km southwest of Mrakovo (the district's administrative centre) by road. Starokhvalynsky is the nearest rural locality.
