= Aknazarovo =

Aknazarovo Акназарово
- Village
- Location within Bashkortostan Location within Russia
- Coordinates: 52°55′N 56°21′E
- Country: Russia
- Region: Bashkortostan
- District: Meleuzovsky District
- Time zone: UTC+5:00

Aknazarovo (Russian: Акназарово; Bashkir: Аҡназар, Aqnazar) is a rural locality (a village) in Saryshevsky Selsoviet, Meleuzovsky District, Bashkortostan, Russia. The population was 168 as of 2010. There are 3 streets.

== Geography ==
Aknazarovo is located 37 km southeast of Meleuz (the district's administrative centre) by road. Yumaguzino is the nearest rural locality.
