= Smakovo =

Smakovo Смаково
- Village
- Location within Bashkortostan Location within Russia
- Coordinates: 53°02′N 56°04′E
- Country: Russia
- Region: Bashkortostan
- District: Meleuzovsky District
- Time zone: UTC+5:00

Smakovo (Russian: Смаково; Bashkir: Смаҡ, Smaq) is a rural locality (a village) and the administrative centre of Araslanovsky Selsoviet, Meleuzovsky District, Bashkortostan, Russia. The population was 444 as of 2010. There are 13 streets.

== Geography ==
Smakovo is located 14 km northeast of Meleuz (the district's administrative centre) by road. Yangi-Aul is the nearest rural locality.
