= Romadanovka, Meleuzovsky District, Republic of Bashkortostan =

Romadanovka Ромадановка
- Village
- Location within Bashkortostan Location within Russia
- Coordinates: 53°22′N 55°48′E
- Country: Russia
- Region: Bashkortostan
- District: Meleuzovsky District
- Time zone: UTC+5:00

Romadanovka (Russian: Ромадановка) is a rural locality (a village) in Korneyevsky Selsoviet, Meleuzovsky District, Bashkortostan, Russia. The population was 9 as of 2010. There is 1 street.

== Geography ==
Romadanovka is located 58 km north of Meleuz (the district's administrative centre) by road. Murdashevo is the nearest rural locality.
