= Syrtlanovo, Meleuzovsky District, Republic of Bashkortostan =

Syrtlanovo Сыртланово
- Village
- Location within Bashkortostan Location within Russia
- Coordinates: 52°58′N 56°29′E
- Country: Russia
- Region: Bashkortostan
- District: Meleuzovsky District
- Time zone: UTC+5:00

Syrtlanovo (Russian: Сыртланово; Bashkir: Һыртлан, Hırtlan) is a rural locality (a village) in Ishtuganovsky Selsoviet, Meleuzovsky District, Bashkortostan, Russia. The population was 335 as of 2010. There are 3 streets.

== Geography ==
Syrtlanovo is located 53 km east of Meleuz (the district's administrative centre) by road. Pribelsky is the nearest rural locality.
