= Tuyembetovo =

Tuyembetovo Туембетово
- Village
- Location within Bashkortostan Location within Russia
- Coordinates: 52°20′N 56°28′E
- Country: Russia
- Region: Bashkortostan
- District: Kugarchinsky District
- Time zone: UTC+5:00

Tuyembetovo (Russian: Туембетово; Bashkir: Туйөмбәт, Tuyömbät) is a rural locality (a village) in Maxyutovsky Selsoviet, Kugarchinsky District, Bashkortostan, Russia. The population was 140 as of 2010. There are 3 streets.

== Geography ==
Tuyembetovo is located 48 km south of Mrakovo (the district's administrative centre) by road. Aygay-Mursalyay is the nearest rural locality.
