= Khlebodarovka, Kugarchinsky District, Republic of Bashkortostan =

Khlebodarovka Хлебодаровка
- Khutor
- Location within Bashkortostan Location within Russia
- Coordinates: 52°52′N 56°15′E
- Country: Russia
- Region: Bashkortostan
- District: Kugarchinsky District
- Time zone: UTC+5:00

Khlebodarovka (Russian: Хлебодаровка) is a rural locality (a village) in Yumaguzinsky Selsoviet, Kugarchinsky District, Bashkortostan, Russia. The population was 69 as of 2010. There is 1 street.

== Geography ==
Khlebodarovka is located 44 km northwest of Mrakovo (the district's administrative centre) by road. Alexandrovka is the nearest rural locality.
