= Tyulyakovo =

Tyulyakovo Тюляково
- Village
- Location within Bashkortostan Location within Russia
- Coordinates: 52°58′N 55°58′E
- Country: Russia
- Region: Bashkortostan
- District: Meleuzovsky District
- Time zone: UTC+5:00

Tyulyakovo (Russian: Тюляково; Bashkir: Түләк, Tüläk) is a rural locality (a village) in Pervomaysky Selsoviet, Meleuzovsky District, Bashkortostan, Russia. The population was 241 as of 2010. There are 7 streets.

== Geography ==
Tyulyakovo is located 5 km east of Meleuz (the district's administrative centre) by road. Meleuz is the nearest rural locality.
