= Varvarino =

Varvarino Варварино
- Selo
- Location within Bashkortostan Location within Russia
- Coordinates: 53°11′N 55°43′E
- Country: Russia
- Region: Bashkortostan
- District: Meleuzovsky District
- Time zone: UTC+5:00

Varvarino (Russian: Варварино) is a rural locality (a selo) in Nordovsky Selsoviet, Meleuzovsky District, Bashkortostan, Russia. The population was 188 as of 2010. There are 3 streets.

== Geography ==
Varvarino is located 48 km northwest of Meleuz (the district's administrative centre) by road. Dmitriyevka is the nearest rural locality.
