= Novopetrovskoye, Kugarchinsky District, Republic of Bashkortostan =

Novopetrovskoye Новопетровское
- Selo
- Location within Bashkortostan Location within Russia
- Coordinates: 52°36′N 56°30′E
- Country: Russia
- Region: Bashkortostan
- District: Kugarchinsky District
- Time zone: UTC+5:00

Novopetrovskoye (Russian: Новопетровское) is a rural locality (a selo) in Novopetrovsky Selsoviet, Kugarchinsky District, Bashkortostan, Russia. The population was 201 as of 2010. There are 3 streets.

== Geography ==
Novopetrovskoye is located 17 km southwest of Mrakovo (the district's administrative centre) by road. Starokhvalynsky is the nearest rural locality.
