= Staro-Almyasovo =

Staro-Almyasovo Старо-Альмясово
- Village
- Location within Bashkortostan Location within Russia
- Coordinates: 52°47′N 56°32′E
- Country: Russia
- Region: Bashkortostan
- District: Kugarchinsky District
- Time zone: UTC+5:00

Staro-Almyasovo (Russian: Старо-Альмясово; Bashkir: Иҫке Әлмәс, İśke Älmäs) is a rural locality (a village) in Ibrayevsky Selsoviet, Kugarchinsky District, Bashkortostan, Russia. The population was 5 as of 2010. There are 2 streets.

== Geography ==
Staro-Almyasovo is located 17 km northwest of Mrakovo (the district's administrative centre) by road. Siksanbayevo is the nearest rural locality.
