= Yangy-Aul =

Yangy-Aul Янги-Аул
- Village
- Location within Bashkortostan Location within Russia
- Coordinates: 53°02′N 56°01′E
- Country: Russia
- Region: Bashkortostan
- District: Meleuzovsky District
- Time zone: UTC+5:00

Yangy-Aul (Russian: Янги-Аул; Bashkir: Яңауыл, Yañawıl) is a rural locality (a village) in Araslanovsky Selsoviet, Meleuzovsky District, Bashkortostan, Russia. The population was 182 as of 2010. There are 2 streets.

== Geography ==
Yangy-Aul is located 17 km northeast of Meleuz (the district's administrative centre) by road. Islamgulovo is the nearest rural locality.
