= Petropavlovka, Kugarchinsky District, Republic of Bashkortostan =

Petropavlovka Петропавловка
- Village
- Location within Bashkortostan Location within Russia
- Coordinates: 52°56′N 56°26′E
- Country: Russia
- Region: Bashkortostan
- District: Kugarchinsky District
- Time zone: UTC+5:00

Petropavlovka (Russian: Петропавловка) is a rural locality (a village) in Nizhnebikkuzinsky Selsoviet, Kugarchinsky District, Bashkortostan, Russia. The population was 4 as of 2010. There is 1 street.

== Geography ==
Petropavlovka is located 43 km north of Mrakovo (the district's administrative centre) by road. Ishtuganovo is the nearest rural locality.
