= Stolyarovka =

Stolyarovka Столяровка
- Village
- Location within Bashkortostan Location within Russia
- Coordinates: 53°17′N 55°53′E
- Country: Russia
- Region: Bashkortostan
- District: Meleuzovsky District
- Time zone: UTC+5:00

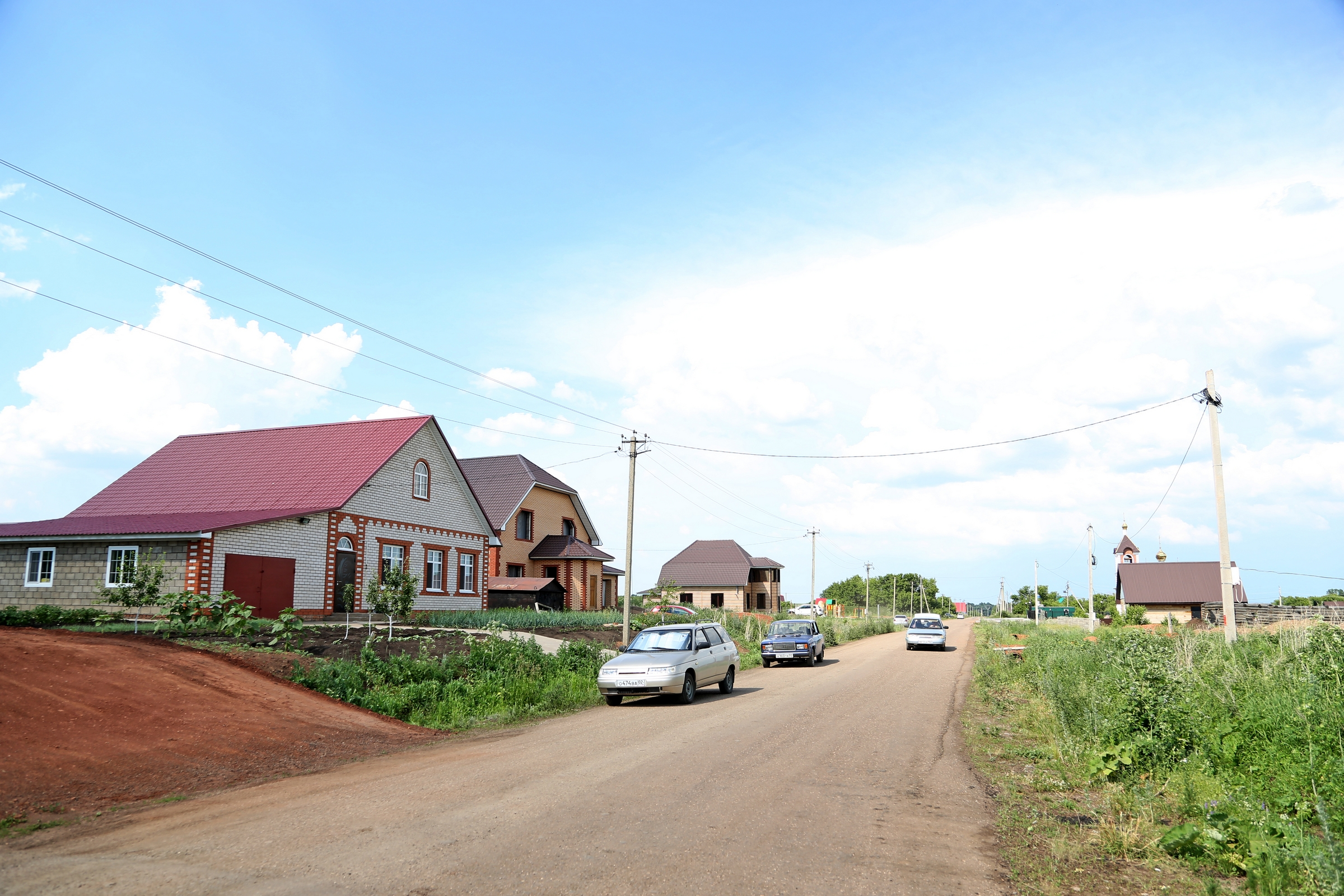
Stolyarovka

Stolyarovka (Russian: Столяровка) is a rural locality (a village) in Zirgansky Selsoviet, Meleuzovsky District, Bashkortostan, Russia. The population was 10 as of 2010. There are 4 streets.

== Geography ==
Stolyarovka is located 45 km north of Meleuz (the district's administrative centre) by road. Semyonovka is the nearest rural locality.
