= Valitovo =

Valitovo Валитово
- Village
- Location within Bashkortostan Location within Russia
- Coordinates: 52°51′N 56°10′E
- Country: Russia
- Region: Bashkortostan
- District: Kugarchinsky District
- Time zone: UTC+5:00

Valitovo (Russian: Валитово; Bashkir: Вәлит, Wälit) is a rural locality (a village) in Yalchinsky Selsoviet, Kugarchinsky District, Bashkortostan, Russia. The population was 74 as of 2010. There are 2 streets.

== Geography ==
Valitovo is located 40 km northwest of Mrakovo (the district's administrative centre) by road. Nizhnesapashevo is the nearest rural locality.
