= Maloisimovo =

Maloisimovo Малоисимово
- Village
- Location within Bashkortostan Location within Russia
- Coordinates: 52°33′N 56°30′E
- Country: Russia
- Region: Bashkortostan
- District: Kugarchinsky District
- Time zone: UTC+5:00

Maloisimovo (Russian: Малоисимово; Bashkir: Кесе Исем, Kese İsem) is a rural locality (a village) in Isimovsky Selsoviet, Kugarchinsky District, Bashkortostan, Russia. The population was 30 as of 2010. There is 1 street.

== Geography ==
Maloisimovo is located 24 km southwest of Mrakovo (the district's administrative centre) by road. Salikhovo is the nearest rural locality.
