= Sapykovo =

Sapykovo Сапыково
- Village
- Location within Bashkortostan Location within Russia
- Coordinates: 52°31′N 56°32′E
- Country: Russia
- Region: Bashkortostan
- District: Kugarchinsky District
- Time zone: UTC+5:00

Sapykovo (Russian: Сапыково; Bashkir: Сапыҡ, Sapıq) is a rural locality (a village) in Izhberdinsky Selsoviet, Kugarchinsky District, Bashkortostan, Russia. The population was 187 as of 2010. There are 3 streets.

== Geography ==
Sapykovo is located 24 km south of Mrakovo (the district's administrative centre) by road. Karan is the nearest rural locality.
