= Bekechevo =

Bekechevo Бекечево
- Village
- Location within Bashkortostan Location within Russia
- Coordinates: 52°39′N 56°21′E
- Country: Russia
- Region: Bashkortostan
- District: Kugarchinsky District
- Time zone: UTC+5:00

Bekechevo (Russian: Бекечево; Bashkir: Бикес, Bikes) is a rural locality (a village) in Tlyaumbetovsky Selsoviet, Kugarchinsky District, Bashkortostan, Russia. The population was 299 as of 2010. There are 3 streets.

== Geography ==
Bekechevo is located 37 km west of Mrakovo (the district's administrative centre) by road. Tlyaumbetovo is the nearest rural locality.
