= Saitovsky =

Saitovsky Саитовский
- Village
- Location within Bashkortostan Location within Russia
- Coordinates: 53°02′N 55°36′E
- Country: Russia
- Region: Bashkortostan
- District: Meleuzovsky District
- Time zone: UTC+5:00

Saitovsky (Russian: Саитовский; Bashkir: Сәйет, Säyet) is a rural locality (a village) in Denisovsky Selsoviet, Meleuzovsky District, Bashkortostan, Russia. The population was 377 as of 2010. There are 7 streets.

== Geography ==
Saitovsky is located 25 km northwest of Meleuz (the district's administrative centre) by road. Saitovo is the nearest rural locality.
