= Izhberdino =

Izhberdino Ижбердино
- Selo
- Location within Bashkortostan Location within Russia
- Coordinates: 52°30′N 56°37′E
- Country: Russia
- Region: Bashkortostan
- District: Kugarchinsky District
- Time zone: UTC+5:00

Izhberdino (Russian: Ижбердино; Bashkir: Ишбирҙе, İşbirźe) is a rural locality (a selo) in Izhberdinsky Selsoviet, Kugarchinsky District, Bashkortostan, Russia. The population was 150 as of 2010. There are 3 streets.

== Geography ==
Izhberdino is located 29 km south of Mrakovo (the district's administrative centre) by road. Bustubayevo is the nearest rural locality.
