= Yakshimbetovo =

Yakshimbetovo Якшимбетово
- Village
- Location within Bashkortostan Location within Russia
- Coordinates: 52°39′N 56°33′E
- Country: Russia
- Region: Bashkortostan
- District: Kugarchinsky District
- Time zone: UTC+5:00

Yakshimbetovo (Russian: Якшимбетово; Bashkir: Яҡшембәт, Yaqşembät) is a rural locality (a village) in Mrakovsky Selsoviet, Kugarchinsky District, Bashkortostan, Russia. The population was 190 as of 2010. There are 2 streets.

== Geography ==
Yakshimbetovo is located 9 km southwest of Mrakovo (the district's administrative centre) by road. Novopokrovskoye is the nearest rural locality.
