= Nazarkino =

Nazarkino Назаркино
- Selo
- Location within Bashkortostan Location within Russia
- Coordinates: 52°17′N 56°29′E
- Country: Russia
- Region: Bashkortostan
- District: Kugarchinsky District
- Time zone: UTC+5:00

Nazarkino (Russian: Назаркино) is a rural locality (a selo) in Maxyutovsky Selsoviet, Kugarchinsky District, Bashkortostan, Russia. The population was 220 as of 2010. There are 5 streets.

== Geography ==
Nazarkino is located 53 km south of Mrakovo (the district's administrative centre) by road. Iknazarovo is the nearest rural locality.
