= Satlyki =

Satlyki Сатлыки
- Village
- Location within Bashkortostan Location within Russia
- Coordinates: 52°35′N 56°47′E
- Country: Russia
- Region: Bashkortostan
- District: Kugarchinsky District
- Time zone: UTC+5:00

Satlyki (Russian: Сатлыки; Bashkir: Һатлыҡ, Hatlıq) is a rural locality (a village) in Yuldybayevsky Selsoviet, Kugarchinsky District, Bashkortostan, Russia. The population was 238 as of 2010. There are 2 streets.

== Geography ==
Satlyki is located 19 km southeast of Mrakovo (the district's administrative centre) by road. Muradym is the nearest rural locality.
