= Yadgarovo =

Yadgarovo Ядгарово
- Village
- Location within Bashkortostan Location within Russia
- Coordinates: 52°46′N 56°08′E
- Country: Russia
- Region: Bashkortostan
- District: Kugarchinsky District
- Time zone: UTC+5:00

Yadgarovo (Russian: Ядгарово; Bashkir: Йәҙгәр, Yäźgär) is a rural locality (a village) in Volostnovsky Selsoviet, Kugarchinsky District, Bashkortostan, Russia. The population was 3 as of 2010. There is 1 street.

== Geography ==
Yadgarovo is located 44 km west of Mrakovo (the district's administrative centre) by road. Yulbashevo is the nearest rural locality.
