= Saitkulovo, Kugarchinsky District, Republic of Bashkortostan =

Saitkulovo Саиткулово
- Selo
- Location within Bashkortostan Location within Russia
- Coordinates: 52°35′N 56°32′E
- Country: Russia
- Region: Bashkortostan
- District: Kugarchinsky District
- Time zone: UTC+5:00

Saitkulovo (Russian: Саиткулово; Bashkir: Сәйетҡол, Säyetqol) is a rural locality (a selo) and the administrative centre of Novopetrovsky Selsoviet, Kugarchinsky District, Bashkortostan, Russia. The population was 193 as of 2010. There are 2 streets.

== Geography ==
Saitkulovo is located 15 km southwest of Mrakovo (the district's administrative centre) by road. Bekeshevo is the nearest rural locality.
