= Kugarchi, Kugarchinsky District, Republic of Bashkortostan =

Kugarchi Кугарчи
- Village
- Location within Bashkortostan Location within Russia
- Coordinates: 52°26′N 56°34′E
- Country: Russia
- Region: Bashkortostan
- District: Kugarchinsky District
- Time zone: UTC+5:00

Kugarchi (Russian: Кугарчи; Bashkir: Күгәрсен, Kügärsen) is a rural locality (a selo) and the administrative centre of Kugarchinsky Selsoviet, Kugarchinsky District, Bashkortostan, Russia. The population was 787 as of 2010. There are 5 streets.

== Geography ==
Kugarchi is located 43 km south of Mrakovo (the district's administrative centre) by road. Semirechye is the nearest rural locality.
