= Kutlubulatovo =

Kutlubulatovo Кутлубулатово
- Village
- Location within Bashkortostan Location within Russia
- Coordinates: 53°00′N 56°14′E
- Country: Russia
- Region: Bashkortostan
- District: Meleuzovsky District
- Time zone: UTC+5:00

Kutlubulatovo (Russian: Кутлубулатово; Bashkir: Ҡотлобулат, Qotlobulat) is a rural locality (a village) in Abitovsky Selsoviet, Meleuzovsky District, Bashkortostan, Russia. The population was 219 as of 2010. There is 1 street.

== Geography ==
Kutlubulatovo is located 26 km east of Meleuz (the district's administrative centre) by road. Basurmanovka is the nearest rural locality.
