= Basurmanovka =

Basurmanovka Басурмановка
- Village
- Location within Bashkortostan Location within Russia
- Coordinates: 52°59′N 56°16′E
- Country: Russia
- Region: Bashkortostan
- District: Meleuzovsky District
- Time zone: UTC+5:00

Basurmanovka (Russian: Басурмановка; Bashkir: Боһорман, Bohorman) is a rural locality (a village) and the administrative centre of Abitovsky Selsoviet, Meleuzovsky District, Bashkortostan, Russia. The population was 202 as of 2010. There are 3 streets.

== Geography ==
Basurmanovka is located 27 km east of Meleuz (the district's administrative centre) by road. Kutlubulatovo is the nearest rural locality.
