= Novopokrovskoye, Republic of Bashkortostan =

Novopokrovskoye Новопокровское
- Selo
- Location within Bashkortostan Location within Russia
- Coordinates: 52°38′N 56°32′E
- Country: Russia
- Region: Bashkortostan
- District: Kugarchinsky District
- Time zone: UTC+5:00

Novopokrovskoye (Russian: Новопокровское) is a rural locality (a selo) in Mrakovsky Selsoviet, Kugarchinsky District, Bashkortostan, Russia. The population was 145 as of 2010. There is 1 street.

== Geography ==
Novopokrovskoye is located 10 km southwest of Mrakovo (the district's administrative centre) by road. Yakshimbetovo is the nearest rural locality.
