= Starokhvalynsky =

Starokhvalynsky Старохвалынский
- Khutor
- Location within Bashkortostan Location within Russia
- Coordinates: 52°38′N 56°30′E
- Country: Russia
- Region: Bashkortostan
- District: Kugarchinsky District
- Time zone: UTC+5:00

Starokhvalynsky (Russian: Старохвалынский; Bashkir: Иҫке Хвалын, İśke Xvalın) is a rural locality (a khutor) in Novopetrovsky Selsoviet, Kugarchinsky District, Bashkortostan, Russia. The population was 12 as of 2010. There is 1 street.

== Geography ==
Starokhvalynsky is located 14 km southwest of Mrakovo (the district's administrative centre) by road. Musino is the nearest rural locality.
