= Kutushevo =

Kutushevo Кутушево
- Village
- Location within Bashkortostan Location within Russia
- Coordinates: 53°00′N 55°57′E
- Country: Russia
- Region: Bashkortostan
- District: Meleuzovsky District
- Time zone: UTC+5:00

Kutushevo (Russian: Кутушево; Bashkir: Ҡотош, Qotoş) is a rural locality (a village) in Meleuzovsky Selsoviet, Meleuzovsky District, Bashkortostan, Russia. The population was 490 as of 2010. There are 16 streets.

== Geography ==
Kutushevo is located 7 km north of Meleuz (the district's administrative centre) by road. Malomukachevo is the nearest rural locality.
