= 1st Tukatovo =

1st Tukatovo 1-е Тукатово 1-се Түкәт 1-se Tükät
- Village
- Location within Bashkortostan Location within Russia
- Coordinates: 52°31′N 56°45′E
- Country: Russia
- Region: Bashkortostan
- District: Kugarchinsky District
- Time zone: UTC+5:00

1st Tukatovo (Russian: 1-е Тукатово; Bashkir: 1-се Түкәт, 1-se Tükät) is a village in Nukayevsky Selsoviet, Kugarchinsky District, Bashkortostan, Russia. The population was 147 as of 2010. There are 2 streets.

== Geography ==
1st Tukatovo is located 32 km south of Mrakovo (the district's administrative centre) by road. Bustubayevo is the nearest rural locality.
