= Bagdashkino =

Rural locality in Yuldybayevsky Selsoviet

Bagdashkino Багдашкино
- Village
- Location within Bashkortostan Location within Russia
- Coordinates: 52°36′N 56°52′E
- Country: Russia
- Region: Bashkortostan
- District: Kugarchinsky District
- Time zone: UTC+5:00

Bagdashkino (Russian: Багдашкино) is a rural locality (a village) in Yuldybayevsky Selsoviet, Kugarchinsky District, Bashkortostan, Russia. The population was 165 as of 2010. There is 1 street.

== Geography ==
Bagdashkino is located 6 km south of Mrakovo (the district's administrative centre) by road.
