= Igubayevo =

Igubayevo Игубаево
- Village
- Location within Bashkortostan Location within Russia
- Coordinates: 52°44′N 56°30′E
- Country: Russia
- Region: Bashkortostan
- District: Kugarchinsky District
- Time zone: UTC+5:00

Igubayevo (Russian: Игубаево; Bashkir: Игебай, İgebay) is a rural locality (a village) in Ibrayevsky Selsoviet, Kugarchinsky District, Bashkortostan, Russia. The population was 172 as of 2010. There are 2 streets.

== Geography ==
Igubayevo is located 11 km northwest of Mrakovo (the district's administrative centre) by road. Ibrayevo is the nearest rural locality.
