= Mukachevo, Kugarchinsky District, Republic of Bashkortostan =

Mukachevo Мукачево
- Village
- Location within Bashkortostan Location within Russia
- Coordinates: 52°28′N 56°29′E
- Country: Russia
- Region: Bashkortostan
- District: Kugarchinsky District
- Time zone: UTC+5:00

Mukachevo (Russian: Мукачево; Bashkir: Моҡас, Moqas) is a rural locality (a village) in Isimovsky Selsoviet, Kugarchinsky District, Bashkortostan, Russia. The population was 149 as of 2010. There is one street.

== Geography ==
Mukachevo is located 34 km south of Mrakovo (the district's administrative centre) by road. Gavrilovsky is the nearest rural locality.
