= Kaskinovo =

Kaskinovo Каскиново
- Village
- Location within Bashkortostan Location within Russia
- Coordinates: 52°26′N 56°24′E
- Country: Russia
- Region: Bashkortostan
- District: Kugarchinsky District
- Time zone: UTC+5:00

Kaskinovo (Russian: Каскиново; Bashkir: Ҡасҡын, Qasqın) is a rural locality (a village) in Sanzyapovsky Selsoviet, Kugarchinsky District, Bashkortostan, Russia. The population was 164 as of 2010. There are 2 streets.

== Geography ==
Kaskinovo is located 45 km southwest of Mrakovo (the district's administrative centre) by road. Verkhnesanzyapovo is the nearest rural locality.
