= Araslanovo =

Araslanovo Арасланово
- Village
- Location within Bashkortostan Location within Russia
- Coordinates: 53°01′N 56°06′E
- Country: Russia
- Region: Bashkortostan
- District: Meleuzovsky District
- Time zone: UTC+5:00

Araslanovo (Russian: Арасланово; Bashkir: Арыҫлан, Arıślan) is a rural locality (a village) in Araslanovsky Selsoviet, Meleuzovsky District, Bashkortostan, Russia. The population was 159 as of 2010. There are 3 streets.

== Geography ==
Araslanovo is located 15 km northeast of Meleuz (the district's administrative centre) by road. Smakovo is the nearest rural locality.
