= Kizray =

Kizray Кизрай
- Village
- Location within Bashkortostan Location within Russia
- Coordinates: 52°57′N 56°08′E
- Country: Russia
- Region: Bashkortostan
- District: Meleuzovsky District
- Time zone: UTC+5:00

Kizray (Russian: Кизрай; Bashkir: Ҡыҙрай, Qıźray) is a rural locality (a village) in Pervomaysky Selsoviet, Meleuzovsky District, Bashkortostan, Russia. The population was 342 as of 2010. There are 6 streets.

== Geography ==
Kizray is located 17 km east of Meleuz (the district's administrative centre) by road. Samaro-Ivanovka is the nearest rural locality.
