= Volostnovka =

Volostnovka Волостновка
- Selo
- Location within Bashkortostan Location within Russia
- Coordinates: 52°48′N 56°14′E
- Country: Russia
- Region: Bashkortostan
- District: Kugarchinsky District
- Time zone: UTC+5:00

Volostnovka (Russian: Волостновка) is a rural locality (a selo) in Volostnovsky Selsoviet, Kugarchinsky District, Bashkortostan, Russia. The population was 423 as of 2010. There are 5 streets.

== Geography ==
Volostnovka is located 33 km northwest of Mrakovo (the district's administrative centre) by road. Kaldarovo is the nearest rural locality.
