= Isimovo =

Isimovo Исимово
- Selo
- Location within Bashkortostan Location within Russia
- Coordinates: 52°32′N 56°30′E
- Country: Russia
- Region: Bashkortostan
- District: Kugarchinsky District
- Time zone: UTC+5:00

Isimovo (Russian: Исимово; Bashkir: Исем, İsäm) is a rural locality (a selo) and the administrative centre of Isimovsky Selsoviet, Kugarchinsky District, Bashkortostan, Russia. The population was 708 as of 2010. There are 6 streets.

== Geography ==
Isimovo is located 26 km south of Mrakovo (the district's administrative centre) by road. Maloisimovo is the nearest rural locality.
