= Islamgulovo =

Islamgulovo Исламгулово
- Village
- Location within Bashkortostan Location within Russia
- Coordinates: 53°01′N 56°00′E
- Country: Russia
- Region: Bashkortostan
- District: Meleuzovsky District
- Time zone: UTC+5:00

Islamgulovo (Russian: Исламгулово; Bashkir: Исламғол, İslamğol) is a rural locality (a village) in Araslanovsky Selsoviet, Meleuzovsky District, Bashkortostan, Russia. The population was 48 as of 2010. There are 2 streets.

== Geography ==
Islamgulovo is located 11 km northeast of Meleuz (the district's administrative centre) by road. Yangi-Aul is the nearest rural locality.
