= Nizhnetashevo =

Nizhnetashevo Нижнеташево
- Village
- Location within Bashkortostan Location within Russia
- Coordinates: 53°02′N 56°22′E
- Country: Russia
- Region: Bashkortostan
- District: Meleuzovsky District
- Time zone: UTC+5:00

Nizhnetashevo (Russian: Нижнеташево; Bashkir: Түбәнге Таш, Tübänge Taş) is a rural locality (a village) in Abitovsky Selsoviet, Meleuzovsky District, Bashkortostan, Russia. The population was 76 as of 2010. There is 1 street.

== Geography ==
Nizhnetashevo is located 39 km east of Meleuz (the district's administrative centre) by road. Andreyevsky is the nearest rural locality.
