= Tumachino =

Tumachino Туманчино
- Village
- Location within Bashkortostan Location within Russia
- Coordinates: 52°51′N 56°04′E
- Country: Russia
- Region: Bashkortostan
- District: Meleuzovsky District
- Time zone: UTC+5:00

Tumachino (Russian: Туманчино; Bashkir: Томансы, Tomansı) is a rural locality (a village) in Aptrakovsky Selsoviet, Meleuzovsky District, Bashkortostan, Russia. The population was 186 as of 2010. There are 4 streets.

== Geography ==
Tumachino is located 19 km southeast of Meleuz (the district's administrative centre) by road. Apasovo is the nearest rural locality.
