= Maxyutovo, Kugarchinsky District, Republic of Bashkortostan =

Maxyutovo Максютово
- Selo
- Location within Bashkortostan Location within Russia
- Coordinates: 52°19′N 56°31′E
- Country: Russia
- Region: Bashkortostan
- District: Kugarchinsky District
- Time zone: UTC+5:00

Maxyutovo (Russian: Максютово; Bashkir: Мәҡсүт, Mäqsüt) is a rural locality (a selo) and the administrative centre of Maxyutovsky Selsoviet, Kugarchinsky District, Bashkortostan, Russia. The population was 1,003 as of 2010. There are 14 streets.

== Geography ==
Maxyutovo is located 57 km south of Mrakovo (the district's administrative centre) by road. Nazarkino is the nearest rural locality.

== See also ==
- Bandabika and Yaransa
