= Itkuchukovo =

Itkuchukovo Иткучуково
- Village
- Location within Bashkortostan Location within Russia
- Coordinates: 52°59′N 56°18′E
- Country: Russia
- Region: Bashkortostan
- District: Meleuzovsky District
- Time zone: UTC+5:00

Itkuchukovo (Russian: Иткучуково; Bashkir: Эткөсөк, Etkösök) is a rural locality (a village) in Abitovsky Selsoviet, Meleuzovsky District, Bashkortostan, Russia. The population was 235 as of 2010. There are 3 streets.

== Geography ==
Itkuchukovo is located 31 km east of Meleuz (the district's administrative centre) by road. Abitovo is the nearest rural locality.
