= Mryaushlinsky =

Mryaushlinsky Мряушлинский
- Village
- Location within Bashkortostan Location within Russia
- Coordinates: 52°54′N 56°32′E
- Country: Russia
- Region: Bashkortostan
- District: Kugarchinsky District
- Time zone: UTC+5:00

Mryaushlinsky (Russian: Мряушлинский; Bashkir: Мерәүешле, Meräweşle) is a rural locality (a village) in Nizhnebikkuzinsky Selsoviet, Kugarchinsky District, Bashkortostan, Russia. The population was 109 as of 2010. There are 2 streets.

== Geography ==
Mryaushlinsky is located 44 km north of Mrakovo (the district's administrative centre) by road. Nizhnebikkuzino is the nearest rural locality.
