= Novaya Kazanovka =

Novaya Kazanovka Новая Казанковка
- Village
- Location within Bashkortostan Location within Russia
- Coordinates: 53°03′N 55°40′E
- Country: Russia
- Region: Bashkortostan
- District: Meleuzovsky District
- Time zone: UTC+5:00

Novaya Kazanovka (Russian: Новая Казанковка) is a rural locality (a village) in Denisovsky Selsoviet, Meleuzovsky District, Bashkortostan, Russia. The population was 240 as of 2010. There are two streets.

== Geography ==
Novaya Kazanovka is located 23 km northwest of Meleuz (the district's administrative centre) by road. Saitovo is the nearest rural locality.
