= Khasanovo, Meleuzovsky District, Republic of Bashkortostan =

Khasanovo Хасаново
- Village
- Location within Bashkortostan Location within Russia
- Coordinates: 52°53′N 56°14′E
- Country: Russia
- Region: Bashkortostan
- District: Meleuzovsky District
- Time zone: UTC+5:00

Khasanovo (Russian: Хасаново; Bashkir: Хәсән, Xäsän) is a rural locality (a village) in Aptrakovsky Selsoviet, Meleuzovsky District, Bashkortostan, Russia. The population was 221 as of 2010. There are 2 streets.

== Geography ==
Khasanovo is located 45 km southeast of Meleuz (the district's administrative centre) by road. Khlebodarovka is the nearest rural locality.
