= Tlyaumbetovo =

Tlyaumbetovo Тляумбетово
- Village
- Location within Bashkortostan Location within Russia
- Coordinates: 52°40′N 56°18′E
- Country: Russia
- Region: Bashkortostan
- District: Kugarchinsky District
- Time zone: UTC+5:00

Tlyaumbetovo (Russian: Тляумбетово; Bashkir: Теләүембәт, Teläwembät) is a rural locality (a village) in Tlyaumbetovsky Selsoviet, Kugarchinsky District, Bashkortostan, Russia. The population was 384 as of 2010. There are 5 streets.

== Geography ==
Tlyaumbetovo is located 38 km west of Mrakovo (the district's administrative centre) by road. Chernigovsky is the nearest rural locality.
