= Beregovka =

Beregovka Береговка
- Village
- Location within Bashkortostan Location within Russia
- Coordinates: 53°06′N 55°57′E
- Country: Russia
- Region: Bashkortostan
- District: Meleuzovsky District
- Time zone: UTC+5:00

Beregovka (Russian: Береговка) is a rural locality (a village) in Araslanovsky Selsoviet, Meleuzovsky District, Bashkortostan, Russia. The population was 129 as of 2010.

== Geography ==
Beregovka is 30 km north of Meleuz (the district's administrative centre) by road. Ivanovka is the nearest rural locality.
