= Konarevka =

Konarevka Конаревка
- Village
- Location within Bashkortostan Location within Russia
- Coordinates: 52°52′N 55°43′E
- Country: Russia
- Region: Bashkortostan
- District: Meleuzovsky District
- Time zone: UTC+5:00

Konarevka (Russian: Конаревка) is a rural locality (a village) in Balzinya Selsoviet, Meleuzovsky District, Bashkortostan, Russia. The population was 29 as of 2019. There are 3 streets.

== Geography ==
Konarevka is located 24 km southwest of Meleuz (the district's administrative centre) by road. Maljahansino is the nearest rural locality.
