= Apasovo =

Apasovo Апасово
- Village
- Location within Bashkortostan Location within Russia
- Coordinates: 52°52′N 56°06′E
- Country: Russia
- Region: Bashkortostan
- District: Meleuzovsky District
- Time zone: UTC+5:00

Apasovo (Russian: Апасово; Bashkir: Апас, Apas) is a rural locality (a village) in Aptrakovsky Selsoviet, Meleuzovsky District, Bashkortostan, Russia. The population was 68 as of 2010. There is 1 street.

== Geography ==
Apasovo is located 21 km southeast of Meleuz (the district's administrative centre) by road. Belsky is the nearest rural locality.
