= Novaya Slobodka =

Novaya Slobodka Новая Слободка
- Village
- Location within Bashkortostan Location within Russia
- Coordinates: 53°15′N 55°47′E
- Country: Russia
- Region: Bashkortostan
- District: Meleuzovsky District
- Time zone: UTC+5:00

Novaya Slobodka (Russian: Новая Слободка) is a rural locality (a village) in Korneyevsky Selsoviet, Meleuzovsky District, Bashkortostan, Russia. The population was 14 as of 2010. There is 1 street.

== Geography ==
Novaya Slobodka is located 49 km northwest of Meleuz (the district's administrative centre) by road. Sukharevka is the nearest rural locality.
