= Kurt-Yelga =

Kurt-Yelga Курт-Елга
- Khutor
- Location within Bashkortostan Location within Russia
- Coordinates: 52°42′N 56°40′E
- Country: Russia
- Region: Bashkortostan
- District: Kugarchinsky District
- Time zone: UTC+5:00

Kurt-Yelga (Russian: Курт-Елга; Bashkir: Ҡортйылға, Qortyılğa) is a rural locality (a khutor) in Mrakovsky Selsoviet, Kugarchinsky District, Bashkortostan, Russia. The population was 40 as of 2010. There are 15 streets.

== Geography ==
Kurt-Yelga is located 4 km east of Mrakovo (the district's administrative centre) by road. Mrakovo is the nearest rural locality.
