= Semirechye, Kugarchinsky District, Republic of Bashkortostan =

Semirechye Семиречье
- Khutor
- Location within Bashkortostan Location within Russia
- Coordinates: 52°26′N 56°36′E
- Country: Russia
- Region: Bashkortostan
- District: Kugarchinsky District
- Time zone: UTC+5:00

Semirechye (Russian: Семиречье) is a rural locality (a khutor) in Kugarchinsky Selsoviet, Kugarchinsky District, Bashkortostan, Russia. The population was 90 as of 2010. There is 1 street.

== Geography ==
Semirechye is located 46 km south of Mrakovo (the district's administrative centre) by road. Davletkulovo 1-ye is the nearest rural locality.
