= Samarovka =

Samarovka Самаровка
- Village
- Location within Bashkortostan Location within Russia
- Coordinates: 53°03′N 55°55′E
- Country: Russia
- Region: Bashkortostan
- District: Meleuzovsky District
- Time zone: UTC+5:00

Samarovka (Russian: Самаровка; Bashkir: Һамар, Hamar) is a rural locality (a village) in Partizansky Selsoviet, Meleuzovsky District, Bashkortostan, Russia. The population was 52 as of 2010. There is 1 street.

== Geography ==
Samarovka is located 14 km north of Meleuz (the district's administrative centre) by road. Daryino is the nearest rural locality.
