= Pervomayskaya, Republic of Bashkortostan =

Pervomayskaya Первомайская
- Village
- Location within Bashkortostan Location within Russia
- Coordinates: 52°54′N 55°58′E
- Country: Russia
- Region: Bashkortostan
- District: Meleuzovsky District
- Time zone: UTC+5:00

Pervomayskaya (Russian: Первомайская; Bashkir: Беренсе май, Berense may) is a rural locality (a village) and the administrative centre of Pervomaysky Selsoviet, Meleuzovsky District, Bashkortostan, Russia. The population was 764 as of 2010. There are 15 streets.

== Geography ==
Pervomayskaya is located 11 km southeast of Meleuz (the district's administrative centre) by road. Staromusino is the nearest rural locality.
