= Korneyevka =

Village in Bashkortostan, Russia

Korneyevka Корнеевка
- Village
- Location within Bashkortostan Location within Russia
- Coordinates: 53°19′N 55°47′E
- Country: Russia
- Region: Bashkortostan
- District: Meleuzovsky District
- Time zone: UTC+5:00

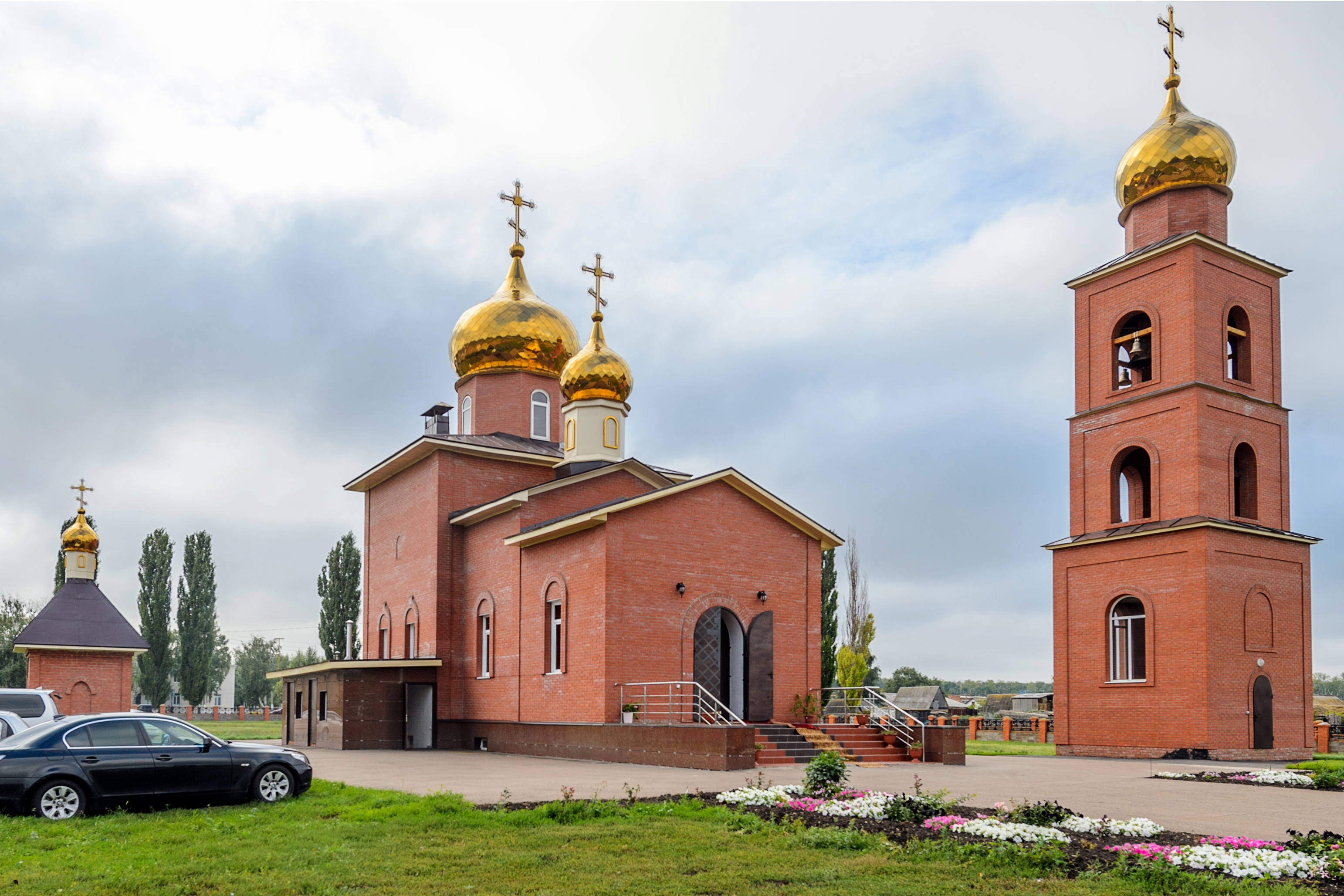
Church in the village of Korneevka

Korneyevka (Russian: Корнеевка) is a rural locality (a village) and the administrative center of Balzinya Selsoviet, Meleuzovsky District, Bashkortostan, Russia. The population was 671 as of 2010. The village has 9 streets.

== Geography ==
Korneyevka is located 53 km south of Meleuz (the district's administrative centre) by road. The nearest rural locality is Gonornaya.
