= Irtyubyak =

Irtyubyak Иртюбяк
- Village
- Location within Bashkortostan Location within Russia
- Coordinates: 52°42′N 56°29′E
- Country: Russia
- Region: Bashkortostan
- District: Kugarchinsky District
- Time zone: UTC+5:00

Irtyubyak (Russian: Иртюбяк; Bashkir: Иртөбәк, İrtöbäk) is a rural locality (a village) in Ibrayevsky Selsoviet, Kugarchinsky District, Bashkortostan, Russia. The population was 70 as of 2010. There is 1 street.

== Geography ==
Irtyubyak is located 14 km west of Mrakovo (the district's administrative centre) by road. Urakayevo is the nearest rural locality.
