= Iknazarovo =

Iknazarovo Икназарово
- Village
- Location within Bashkortostan Location within Russia
- Coordinates: 52°16′N 56°29′E
- Country: Russia
- Region: Bashkortostan
- District: Kugarchinsky District
- Time zone: UTC+5:00

Iknazarovo (Russian: Икназарово; Bashkir: Иҡназар, İqnazar) is a rural locality (a village) in Maxyutovsky Selsoviet, Kugarchinsky District, Bashkortostan, Russia. The population was 3 as of 2010. There is 1 street.

== Geography ==
Iknazarovo is located 55 km south of Mrakovo (the district's administrative centre) by road. Nazarkino is the nearest rural locality.
