= Klimovka, Republic of Bashkortostan =

Klimovka Климовка
- Village
- Location within Bashkortostan Location within Russia
- Coordinates: 53°09′N 55°55′E
- Country: Russia
- Region: Bashkortostan
- District: Meleuzovsky District
- Time zone: UTC+5:00

Klimovka (Russian: Климовка) is a rural locality (a village) in Zirgansky Selsoviet, Meleuzovsky District, Bashkortostan, Russia. The population was 20 as of 2010. There is 1 street.

== Geography ==
Klimovka is located 32 km north of Meleuz (the district's administrative centre) by road. Yumakovo is the nearest rural locality.
