= Berkutovo =

Berkutovo Беркутово
- Village
- Location within Bashkortostan Location within Russia
- Coordinates: 52°21′N 56°35′E
- Country: Russia
- Region: Bashkortostan
- District: Kugarchinsky District
- Time zone: UTC+5:00

Berkutovo (Russian: Беркутово; Bashkir: Бөркөт, Börköt) is a rural locality (a village) in Maxyutovsky Selsoviet, Kugarchinsky District, Bashkortostan, Russia. The population was 11 as of 2010. There is 1 street.

== Geography ==
Berkutovo is located 53 km south of Mrakovo (the district's administrative centre) by road. Bash-Berkutovo is the nearest rural locality.
