= Simbirsky =

Simbirsky Симбирский
- Khutor
- Location within Bashkortostan Location within Russia
- Coordinates: 52°15′N 56°32′E
- Country: Russia
- Region: Bashkortostan
- District: Kugarchinsky District
- Time zone: UTC+5:00

Simbirsky (Russian: Симбирский; Bashkir: Сембер, Sember) is a rural locality (a khutor) in Maxyutovsky Selsoviet, Kugarchinsky District, Bashkortostan, Russia. The population was 24 as of 2010. There is 1 street.

== Geography ==
Simbirsky is located 6 km south of Mrakovo (the district's administrative centre) by road.
