= Bash-Berkutovo =

Bash-Berkutovo Баш-Беркутово
- Village
- Location within Bashkortostan Location within Russia
- Coordinates: 52°21′N 56°36′E
- Country: Russia
- Region: Bashkortostan
- District: Kugarchinsky District
- Time zone: UTC+5:00

Bash-Berkutovo (Russian: Баш-Беркутово; Bashkir: Баш-Бөркөт, Baş-Börköt) is a rural locality (a village) in Maxyutovsky Selsoviet, Kugarchinsky District, Bashkortostan, Russia. The population was 2 as of 2010. There is 1 street.

== Geography ==
Bash-Berkutovo is located 55 km south of Mrakovo (the district's administrative centre) by road. Berkutovo is the nearest rural locality.
