= Bekeshevo, Kugarchinsky District, Republic of Bashkortostan =

Bekeshevo Бекешево
- Selo
- Location within Bashkortostan Location within Russia
- Coordinates: 52°35′N 56°32′E
- Country: Russia
- Region: Bashkortostan
- District: Kugarchinsky District
- Time zone: UTC+5:00

Bekeshevo (Russian: Бекешево; Bashkir: Бикеш, Bikeş) is a rural locality (a selo) in Novopetrovsky Selsoviet, Kugarchinsky District, Bashkortostan, Russia. The population was 192 as of 2010. There are 2 streets.

== Geography ==
Bekeshevo is located 17 km southwest of Mrakovo (the district's administrative centre) by road. Saitkulovo is the nearest rural locality.
