= Kaldarovo =

Kaldarovo Калдарово
- Village
- Location within Bashkortostan Location within Russia
- Coordinates: 52°46′N 56°15′E
- Country: Russia
- Region: Bashkortostan
- District: Kugarchinsky District
- Time zone: UTC+5:00

Kaldarovo (Russian: Калдарово; Bashkir: Ҡалдар, Qaldar) is a rural locality (a village) and the administrative centre of Volostnovsky Selsoviet, Kugarchinsky District, Bashkortostan, Russia. The population was 322 as of 2010. There are 4 streets.

== Geography ==
Kaldarovo is located 30 km northwest of Mrakovo (the district's administrative centre) by road. Tyulyabayevo is the nearest rural locality.
