= Verkhneyuldashevo =

Verkhneyuldashevo Верхнеюлдашево
- Village
- Location within Bashkortostan Location within Russia
- Coordinates: 53°18′N 55°58′E
- Country: Russia
- Region: Bashkortostan
- District: Meleuzovsky District
- Time zone: UTC+5:00

Verkhneyuldashevo (Russian: Верхнеюлдашево; Bashkir: Үрге Юлдаш, Ürge Yuldaş) is a rural locality (a village) in Zirgansky Selsoviet, Meleuzovsky District, Bashkortostan, Russia. The population was 392 as of 2010. There are 10 streets.

== Geography ==
Verkhneyuldashevo is located 45 km north of Meleuz (the district's administrative centre) by road. Salavat is the nearest rural locality.
