= Saryshevo, Meleuzovsky District, Republic of Bashkortostan =

Saryshevo Сарышево
- Village
- Location within Bashkortostan Location within Russia
- Coordinates: 52°54′N 56°19′E
- Country: Russia
- Region: Bashkortostan
- District: Meleuzovsky District
- Time zone: UTC+5:00

Saryshevo (Russian: Сарышево; Bashkir: Һарыш, Harış) is a rural locality (a village) and the administrative centre of Saryshevsky Selsoviet, Meleuzovsky District, Bashkortostan, Russia. The population was 406 as of 2010. There are 4 streets.

== Geography ==
Saryshevo is located 39 km southeast of Meleuz (the district's administrative centre) by road. Alexandrovka is the nearest rural locality.
