= Kuzminskoye =

Kuzminskoye Кузьминское
- Village
- Location within Bashkortostan Location within Russia
- Coordinates: 52°55′N 55°55′E
- Country: Russia
- Region: Bashkortostan
- District: Meleuzovsky District
- Time zone: UTC+5:00

Kuzminskoye (Russian: Кузьминское) is a rural locality (a village) in Meleuzovsky Selsoviet, Meleuzovsky District, Bashkortostan, Russia. The population was 225 as of 2010. There are 3 streets.

== Geography ==
Kuzminskoye is located 5 km south of Meleuz (the district's administrative centre) by road. Karan is the nearest rural locality.
