= Poboishche =

Poboishche Побоище
- Selo
- Location within Bashkortostan Location within Russia
- Coordinates: 52°43′N 57°08′E
- Country: Russia
- Region: Bashkortostan
- District: Kugarchinsky District
- Time zone: UTC+5:00

Poboishche (Russian: Побоище) is a rural locality (a selo) and the administrative centre of Poboishchensky Selsoviet, Kugarchinsky District, Bashkortostan, Russia. The population was 194 as of 2010. There are 4 streets.

== Geography ==
Poboishche is located 53 km east of Mrakovo (the district's administrative centre) by road. Shcherbaki is the nearest rural locality.
