= 2nd Tukatovo =

2nd Tukatovo 2-е Тукатово 2-се Түкәт 2-se Tükät
- Village
- Location within Bashkortostan Location within Russia
- Coordinates: 52.525833°N 56.6575°E
- Country: Russia
- Region: Bashkortostan
- District: Kugarchinsky District

Population (2010)
  - Total: 19
- Time zone: UTC+05:00

2nd Tukatovo (Russian: 2-е Тукатово; Bashkir: 2-се Түкәт, 2-se Tükät) is a rural locality (a settlement) in Nukayevsky Selsoviet of Kugarchinsky District, Bashkortostan, Russia. The population was 19 as of 2010.

== Geography ==
2nd Tukatovo is located 34 km south of Mrakovo (the district's administrative centre) by road. Nukayevo is the nearest rural locality.

== Ethnicity ==
The village is inhabited by Bashkirs and others.

== Streets ==
- Tsentralnaya
