= Beryozovsky, Republic of Bashkortostan =

Beryozovsky Берёзовский
- Khutor
- Location within Bashkortostan Location within Russia
- Coordinates: 52°59′N 56°29′E
- Country: Russia
- Region: Bashkortostan
- District: Meleuzovsky District
- Time zone: UTC+5:00

Beryozovsky (Russian: Берёзовский) is a rural locality (a khutor) in Ishtuganovsky Selsoviet, Meleuzovsky District, Bashkortostan, Russia. The population was 4 as of 2010. There is 1 street.

== Geography ==
Beryozovsky is located 51 km east of Meleuz (the district's administrative centre) by road. Syrtlanovo is the nearest rural locality.
