= Staraya Kazanovka =

Staraya Kazanovka Старая Казанковка
- Village
- Location within Bashkortostan Location within Russia
- Coordinates: 53°02′N 55°46′E
- Country: Russia
- Region: Bashkortostan
- District: Meleuzovsky District
- Time zone: UTC+5:00

Staraya Kazanovka (Russian: Старая Казанковка) is a rural locality (a village) in Partizansky Selsoviet, Meleuzovsky District, Bashkortostan, Russia. The population was 37 as of 2010. There are 2 streets.

== Geography ==
Staraya Kazanovka is located 22 km northwest of Meleuz (the district's administrative centre) by road. Troitskoye is the nearest rural locality.
