= Malosharipovo =

Malosharipovo Малошарипово
- Village
- Location within Bashkortostan Location within Russia
- Coordinates: 53°01′N 56°09′E
- Country: Russia
- Region: Bashkortostan
- District: Meleuzovsky District
- Time zone: UTC+5:00

Malosharipovo (Russian: Малошарипово; Bashkir: Бәләкәй Шәрип, Bäläkäy Şärip) is a rural locality (a village) in Araslanovsky Selsoviet, Meleuzovsky District, Bashkortostan, Russia. The population was 237 as of 2010. There are two streets.

== Geography ==
Malosharipovo is located 21 km northeast of Meleuz (the district's administrative centre) by road. Krasny Yar is the nearest rural locality.
