= Terekla =

Terekla Терекла
- Village
- Location within Bashkortostan Location within Russia
- Coordinates: 53°07′N 55°49′E
- Country: Russia
- Region: Bashkortostan
- District: Meleuzovsky District
- Time zone: UTC+5:00

Terekla (Russian: Терекла; Bashkir: Тирәкле, Tiräkle) is a rural locality (a village) in Zirgansky Selsoviet, Meleuzovsky District, Bashkortostan, Russia. The population was 67 as of 2010. There are 6 streets.

== Geography ==
Terekla is located 29 km north of Meleuz (the district's administrative centre) by road. Staraya Kazanovka and Troitskoye are the nearest rural localities.
