= Verkhnesyuryubayevo =

Verkhnesyuryubayevo Верхнесюрюбаево
- Village
- Location within Bashkortostan Location within Russia
- Coordinates: 52°26′N 56°30′E
- Country: Russia
- Region: Bashkortostan
- District: Kugarchinsky District
- Time zone: UTC+5:00

Verkhnesyuryubayevo (Russian: Верхнесюрюбаево; Bashkir: Үрге Сирбай, Ürge Sirbay) is a rural locality (a village) in Kugarchinsky Selsoviet, Kugarchinsky District, Bashkortostan, Russia. The population was 188 as of 2010. There are 4 streets.

== Geography ==
Verkhnesyuryubayevo is located 38 km south of Mrakovo (the district's administrative centre) by road. Verkhnemursalyayevo is the nearest rural locality.
