= Yuldybay =

Yuldybay Юлдыбай
- Village
- Location within Bashkortostan Location within Russia
- Coordinates: 52°38′N 56°46′E
- Country: Russia
- Region: Bashkortostan
- District: Kugarchinsky District
- Time zone: UTC+5:00

Yuldybay (Russian: Юлдыбай; Bashkir: Юлдыбай, Yuldıbay) is a rural locality (a village) and the administrative centre of Yuldybayevsky Selsoviet, Kugarchinsky District, Bashkortostan, Russia. The population was 276 as of 2010. There are 6 streets.

== Geography ==
Yuldybay is located 15 km southeast of Mrakovo (the district's administrative centre) by road. Novokhvalynsky is the nearest rural locality.
