= Gaziz, Kugarchinsky District, Republic of Bashkortostan =

Gaziz Газиз
- Village
- Location within Bashkortostan Location within Russia
- Coordinates: 52°46′N 56°27′E
- Country: Russia
- Region: Bashkortostan
- District: Kugarchinsky District
- Time zone: UTC+5:00

Gaziz (Russian: Газиз; Bashkir: Ғәзиз, Ğäziz) is a rural locality (a village) in Ibrayevsky Selsoviet, Kugarchinsky District, Bashkortostan, Russia. The population was 74 as of 2010. There is 1 street.

== Geography ==
Gaziz is located 16 km northwest of Mrakovo (the district's administrative centre) by road. Igubayevo is the nearest rural locality.
