= Ibragimovo, Kugarchinsky District, Republic of Bashkortostan =

Ibragimovo Ибрагимово
- Village
- Location within Bashkortostan Location within Russia
- Coordinates: 52°40′N 56°14′E
- Country: Russia
- Region: Bashkortostan
- District: Kugarchinsky District
- Time zone: UTC+5:00

Ibragimovo (Russian: Ибрагимово; Bashkir: Ибраһим, İbrahim) is a rural locality (a village) in Yuldybayevsky Selsoviet, Kugarchinsky District, Bashkortostan, Russia. The population was 172 as of 2010. There are 3 streets.

== Geography ==
Ibragimovo is located 8 km southeast of Mrakovo (the district's administrative centre) by road. 1-ye Tupchanovo is the nearest rural locality.
