= Sabashevo =

Sabashevo Сабашево
- Village
- Location within Bashkortostan Location within Russia
- Coordinates: 53°15′N 55°57′E
- Country: Russia
- Region: Bashkortostan
- District: Meleuzovsky District
- Time zone: UTC+5:00

Sabashevo (Russian: Сабашево; Bashkir: Һабаш, Habaş) is a rural locality (a village) in Zirgansky Selsoviet, Meleuzovsky District, Bashkortostan, Russia. The population was 300 as of 2010. There are 6 streets.

== Geography ==
Sabashevo is located 39 km north of Meleuz (the district's administrative centre) by road. Yasheltau is the nearest rural locality.
