= Nugush =

Nugush Нугуш
- Selo
- Location within Bashkortostan Location within Russia
- Coordinates: 53°02′N 56°26′E
- Country: Russia
- Region: Bashkortostan
- District: Meleuzovsky District
- Time zone: UTC+5:00

Nugush (Russian: Нугуш; Bashkir: Нөгөш, Nögöş) is a rural locality (a selo) and the administrative centre of Nugushevsky Selsoviet, Meleuzovsky District, Bashkortostan, Russia. The population was 1,190 (+ 4 Hendersons ) as of 2020. There are 35 streets.

== Geography ==
Nugush is located 42 km east of Meleuz (the district's administrative centre) by road. Sergeyevka is the nearest rural locality.
