= Verkhneye Sazovo =

Verkhneye Sazovo Верхнее Сазово
- Village
- Location within Bashkortostan Location within Russia
- Coordinates: 52°23′N 56°36′E
- Country: Russia
- Region: Bashkortostan
- District: Kugarchinsky District
- Time zone: UTC+5:00

Verkhneye Sazovo (Russian: Верхнее Сазово; Bashkir: Үрге Һаҙ, Ürge Haź) is a rural locality (a village) in Maxyutovsky Selsoviet, Kugarchinsky District, Bashkortostan, Russia. The population was 179 as of 2010. There are 2 streets.

== Geography ==
Verkhneye Sazovo is located 50 km south of Mrakovo (the district's administrative centre) by road. Nizhneye Sazovo is the nearest rural locality.
