= Sultangulovo =

Sultangulovo Султангулово
- Village
- Location within Bashkortostan Location within Russia
- Coordinates: 52°45′N 56°37′E
- Country: Russia
- Region: Bashkortostan
- District: Kugarchinsky District
- Time zone: UTC+5:00

Sultangulovo (Russian: Султангулово; Bashkir: Солтанғол, Soltanğol) is a rural locality (a village) in Mrakovsky Selsoviet, Kugarchinsky District, Bashkortostan, Russia. The population was 86 as of 2010. There are 3 streets.

== Geography ==
Sultangulovo is located 7 km north of Mrakovo (the district's administrative centre) by road. Vasilyevsky is the nearest rural locality.
