= Tyulyabayevo =

Tyulyabayevo Тюлябаево
- Village
- Location within Bashkortostan Location within Russia
- Coordinates: 52°45′N 56°15′E
- Country: Russia
- Region: Bashkortostan
- District: Kugarchinsky District
- Time zone: UTC+5:00

Tyulyabayevo (Russian: Тюлябаево; Bashkir: Түләбай, Tüläbay) is a rural locality (a village) in Volostnovsky Selsoviet, Kugarchinsky District, Bashkortostan, Russia. The population was 176 as of 2010. There are 3 streets.

== Geography ==
Tyulyabayevo is located 32 km northwest of Mrakovo (the district's administrative centre) by road. Kaldarovo is the nearest rural locality.
