= Yumakovo =

Yumakovo Юмаково
- Village
- Location within Bashkortostan Location within Russia
- Coordinates: 53°10′N 55°58′E
- Country: Russia
- Region: Bashkortostan
- District: Meleuzovsky District
- Time zone: UTC+5:00

Yumakovo (Russian: Юмаково; Bashkir: Йомаҡ, Yomaq) is a rural locality (a village) in Zirgansky Selsoviet, Meleuzovsky District, Bashkortostan, Russia. The population was 176 as of 2010. There are 4 streets.

== Geography ==
Yumakovo is located 35 km north of Meleuz (the district's administrative centre) by road. Klimovka is the nearest rural locality.
