= Zirikovo, Meleuzovsky District, Republic of Bashkortostan =

Zirikovo Зириково
- Village
- Location within Bashkortostan Location within Russia
- Coordinates: 53°00′N 56°23′E
- Country: Russia
- Region: Bashkortostan
- District: Meleuzovsky District
- Time zone: UTC+5:00

Zirikovo (Russian: Зириково; Bashkir: Ерек, Yerek) is a rural locality (a village) in Abitovsky Selsoviet, Meleuzovsky District, Bashkortostan, Russia. The population was 180 as of 2010. There is 1 street.

== Geography ==
Zirikovo is located 36 km east of Meleuz (the district's administrative centre) by road. Abitovo is the nearest rural locality.
