= Nukayevo =

Nukayevo Нукаево
- Selo
- Location within Bashkortostan Location within Russia
- Coordinates: 52°33′N 56°41′E
- Country: Russia
- Region: Bashkortostan
- District: Kugarchinsky District
- Time zone: UTC+5:00

Nukayevo (Russian: Нукаево; Bashkir: Нуҡай, Nuqay) is a rural locality (a selo) and the administrative centre of Nukayevsky Selsoviet, Kugarchinsky District, Bashkortostan, Russia. The population was 298 as of 2010. There are 3 streets.

== Geography ==
Nukayevo is located 27 km south of Mrakovo (the district's administrative centre) by road. 1-ye Tukatovo is the nearest rural locality.
