= Nordovka =

Nordovka Нордовка
- Selo
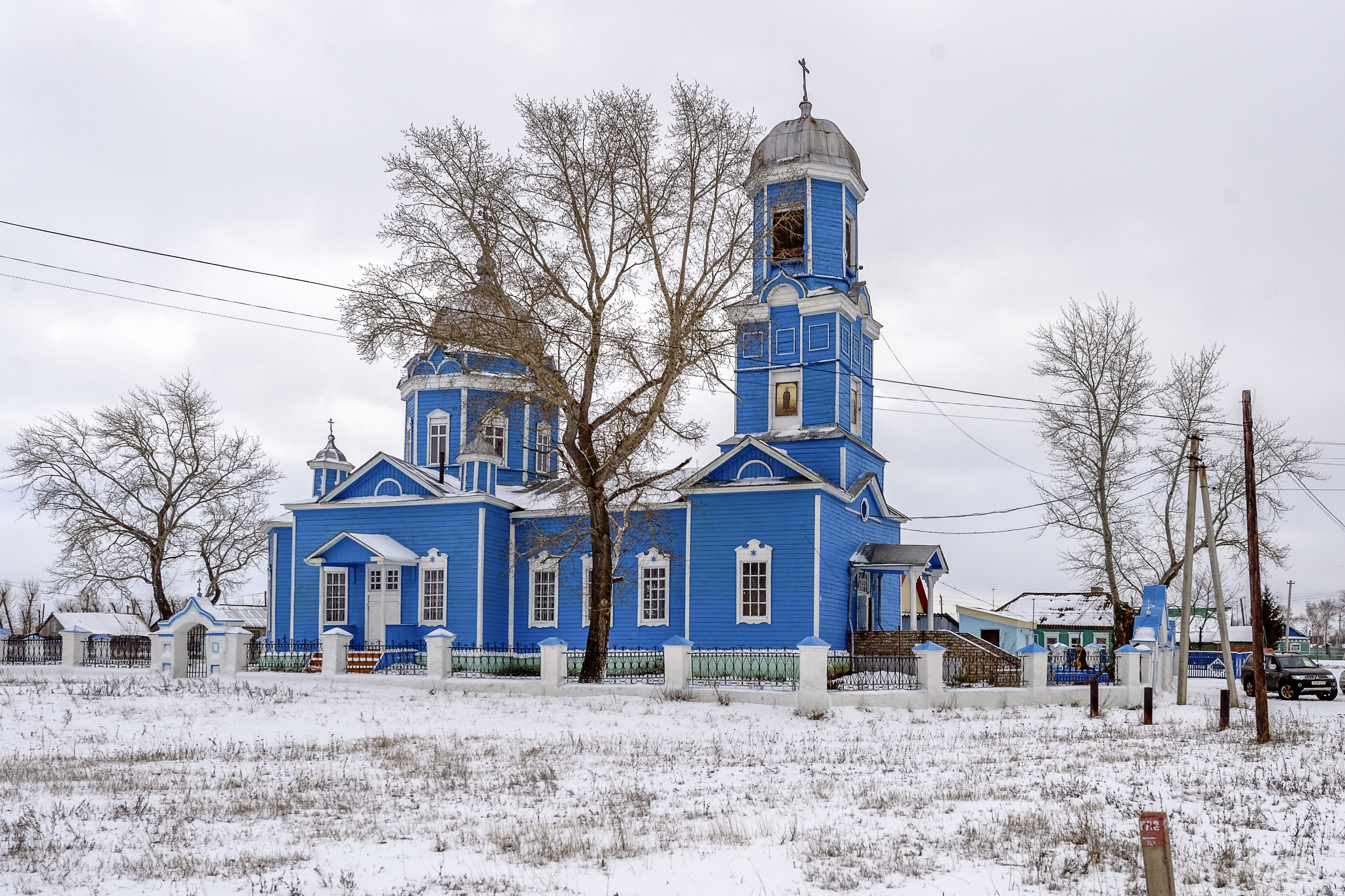
- A building in Nordovka

- Location within Bashkortostan Location within Russia
- Coordinates: 53°14′N 55°35′E
- Country: Russia
- Region: Bashkortostan
- District: Meleuzovsky District
- Time zone: UTC+5:00

Nordovka (Russian: Нордовка) is a rural locality (a selo) and the administrative centre of Nordovsky Selsoviet, Meleuzovsky District, Bashkortostan, Russia. The population was 1,000 as of 2010. There are 9 streets.

== Geography ==
Nordovka is located 54 km northwest of Meleuz (the district's administrative centre) by road. Mustafino is the nearest rural locality.
