= Ibrayevo, Kugarchinsky District, Republic of Bashkortostan =

Ibrayevo Ибраево
- Village
- Location within Bashkortostan Location within Russia
- Coordinates: 52°44′N 56°30′E
- Country: Russia
- Region: Bashkortostan
- District: Kugarchinsky District
- Time zone: UTC+5:00

Ibrayevo (Russian: Ибраево; Bashkir: Ибрай, İbray) is a rural locality (a village) and the administrative centre of Ibrayevsky Selsoviet, Kugarchinsky District, Bashkortostan, Russia. The population was 155 as of 2010. There are 3 streets.

== Geography ==
Ibrayevo is located 10 km northwest of Mrakovo (the district's administrative centre) by road. Igubayevo is the nearest rural locality.
