= Tangaur =

Tangaur Тангаур
- Village
- Location within Bashkortostan Location within Russia
- Coordinates: 52°31′N 56°24′E
- Country: Russia
- Region: Bashkortostan
- District: Kugarchinsky District
- Time zone: UTC+5:00

Tangaur (Russian: Тангаур; Bashkir: Дүңгәүер, Düñgäwer) is a rural locality (a village) in Isimovsky Selsoviet, Kugarchinsky District, Bashkortostan, Russia. The population was 6 as of 2010. There is 1 street.

== Geography ==
Tangaur is located 47 km southwest of Mrakovo (the district's administrative centre) by road. Verkhnesanzyapovo is the nearest rural locality.
