= Samaro-Ivanovka =

Samaro-Ivanovka Самаро-Ивановка
- Village
- Location within Bashkortostan Location within Russia
- Coordinates: 52°56′N 56°03′E
- Country: Russia
- Region: Bashkortostan
- District: Meleuzovsky District
- Time zone: UTC+5:00

Samaro-Ivanovka (Russian: Самаро-Ивановка; Bashkir: Һамар-Ивановка, Hamar-İvanovka) is a rural locality (a village) in Pervomaysky Selsoviet, Meleuzovsky District, Bashkortostan, Russia. The population was 320 as of 2010. There are 5 streets.

== Geography ==
Samaro-Ivanovka is located 12 km east of Meleuz (the district's administrative centre) by road. Uzya is the nearest rural locality.
