= Novosapashevo =

Novosapashevo Новосапашево
- Village
- Location within Bashkortostan Location within Russia
- Coordinates: 52°50′N 56°12′E
- Country: Russia
- Region: Bashkortostan
- District: Kugarchinsky District
- Time zone: UTC+5:00

Novosapashevo (Russian: Новосапашево; Bashkir: Яңы Һапаш, Yañı Hapaş) is a rural locality (a village) in Volostnovsky Selsoviet, Kugarchinsky District, Bashkortostan, Russia. The population was 37 as of 2010. There is 1 street.

== Geography ==
Novosapashevo is located 36 km northwest of Mrakovo (the district's administrative centre) by road. Volostnovka is the nearest rural locality.
