= Davletkulovo =

Davletkulovo Давлеткулово
- Village
- Location within Bashkortostan Location within Russia
- Coordinates: 53°17′N 55°45′E
- Country: Russia
- Region: Bashkortostan
- District: Meleuzovsky District
- Time zone: UTC+5:00

Davletkulovo (Russian: Давлеткулово; Bashkir: Дәүләтҡол, Däwlätqol) is a rural locality (a village) in Korneyevsky Selsoviet, Meleuzovsky District, Bashkortostan, Russia. The population was 145 as of 2010. There are 2 streets.

== Geography ==
Davletkulovo is located 51 km north of Meleuz (the district's administrative centre) by road. Sukharevka is the nearest rural locality.
