= Muradym, Kugarchinsky District, Republic of Bashkortostan =

Muradym Мурадым
- Village
- Location within Bashkortostan Location within Russia
- Coordinates: 52°35′N 56°50′E
- Country: Russia
- Region: Bashkortostan
- District: Kugarchinsky District
- Time zone: UTC+5:00

Muradym (Russian: Мурадым; Bashkir: Мораҙым, Moraźım) is a rural locality (a village) in Yuldybayevsky Selsoviet, Kugarchinsky District, Bashkortostan, Russia. The population was 165 as of 2010. There are 2 streets.

== Geography ==
Muradym is located 24 km southeast of Mrakovo (the district's administrative centre) by road. Bagdashkino is the nearest rural locality.
