= Karan, Kugarchinsky District, Republic of Bashkortostan =

Karan Каран
- Selo
- Location within Bashkortostan Location within Russia
- Coordinates: 52°30′N 56°33′E
- Country: Russia
- Region: Bashkortostan
- District: Kugarchinsky District
- Time zone: UTC+5:00

Karan (Russian: Каран; Bashkir: Ҡаран, Qaran) is a rural locality (a selo) in Izhberdinsky Selsoviet, Kugarchinsky District, Bashkortostan, Russia. The population was 119 as of 2010. There are 2 streets.

== Geography ==
Karan is located 26 km south of Mrakovo (the district's administrative centre) by road. Sapykovo is the nearest rural locality.
