= Serp i Molot, Republic of Bashkortostan =

Serp i Molot Серп и Молот
- Village
- Location within Bashkortostan Location within Russia
- Coordinates: 52°33′N 56°29′E
- Country: Russia
- Region: Bashkortostan
- District: Kugarchinsky District
- Time zone: UTC+5:00

Serp i Molot (Russian: Серп и Молот) is a rural locality (a khutor) in Isimovsky Selsoviet, Kugarchinsky District, Bashkortostan, Russia. The population was 16 as of 2010. There is 1 street.

== Geography ==
Serp i Molot is located 25 km southwest of Mrakovo (the district's administrative centre) by road. Maloisimovo is the nearest rural locality.
