= Nizhnebikkuzino =

Nizhnebikkuzino Нижнебиккузино
- Village
- Location within Bashkortostan Location within Russia
- Coordinates: 52°57′N 56°30′E
- Country: Russia
- Region: Bashkortostan
- District: Kugarchinsky District
- Time zone: UTC+5:00

Nizhnebikkuzino (Russian: Нижнебиккузино; Bashkir: Түбәнге Бикҡужа, Tübänge Bikquja) is a rural locality (a village) and the administrative centre of Nizhnebikkuzinsky Selsoviet, Kugarchinsky District, Bashkortostan, Russia. The population was 263 as of 2010. There are 4 streets.

== Geography ==
Nizhnebikkuzino is located 44 km north of Mrakovo (the district's administrative centre) by road. Pribelsky is the nearest rural locality.
