= Verkhnesanzyapovo =

Verkhnesanzyapovo Верхнесанзяпово
- Selo
- Location within Bashkortostan Location within Russia
- Coordinates: 52°29′N 56°23′E
- Country: Russia
- Region: Bashkortostan
- District: Kugarchinsky District
- Time zone: UTC+5:00

Verkhnesanzyapovo (Russian: Верхнесанзяпово; Bashkir: Үрге Санъяп, Ürge Sanyap) is a rural locality (a selo) and the administrative centre of Sanzyapovsky Selsoviet, Kugarchinsky District, Bashkortostan, Russia. The population was 234 as of 2010. There are 3 streets.

== Geography ==
Verkhnesanzyapovo is located 41 km southwest of Mrakovo (the district's administrative centre) by road. Kaskinovo is the nearest rural locality.
