= Mullagulovo =

Mullagulovo Муллагулово
- Village
- Location within Bashkortostan Location within Russia
- Coordinates: 52°53′N 56°11′E
- Country: Russia
- Region: Bashkortostan
- District: Meleuzovsky District
- Time zone: UTC+5:00

Mullagulovo (Russian: Муллагулово; Bashkir: Муллағол, Mullağol) is a rural locality (a village) in Aptrakovsky Selsoviet, Meleuzovsky District, Bashkortostan, Russia. The population was 155 as of 2010. There are 2 streets.

== Geography ==
Mullagulovo is located 27 km southeast of Meleuz (the district's administrative centre) by road. Aptrakovo is the nearest rural locality.
