= Kanakachevo =

Kanakachevo Канакачево
- Village
- Location within Bashkortostan Location within Russia
- Coordinates: 52°39′N 56°31′E
- Country: Russia
- Region: Bashkortostan
- District: Kugarchinsky District
- Time zone: UTC+5:00

Kanakachevo (Russian: Канакачево; Bashkir: Ҡанаҡас, Qanaqas) is a rural locality (a village) in Mrakovsky Selsoviet, Kugarchinsky District, Bashkortostan, Russia. The population was 100 as of 2010. There are 2 streets.

== Geography ==
Kanakachevo is located 12 km southwest of Mrakovo (the district's administrative centre) by road. Novonikolayevskoye is the nearest rural locality.
