= Siksanbayevo =

Siksanbayevo Сиксанбаево
- Village
- Location within Bashkortostan Location within Russia
- Coordinates: 52°47′N 56°30′E
- Country: Russia
- Region: Bashkortostan
- District: Kugarchinsky District
- Time zone: UTC+5:00

Siksanbayevo (Russian: Сиксанбаево; Bashkir: Һикһәнбай, Hikhänbay) is a rural locality (a village) in Ibrayevsky Selsoviet, Kugarchinsky District, Bashkortostan, Russia. The population was 104 as of 2010. There are 2 streets.

== Geography ==
Siksanbayevo is located 15 km northwest of Mrakovo (the district's administrative centre) by road. Staro-Almyasovo is the nearest rural locality.
