= Ulutup =

Ulutup Улутуп
- Khutor
- Location within Bashkortostan Location within Russia
- Coordinates: 52°53′N 56°22′E
- Country: Russia
- Region: Bashkortostan
- District: Kugarchinsky District
- Time zone: UTC+5:00

Ulutup (Russian: Улутуп; Bashkir: Олотөп, Olotöp) is a rural locality (a khutor) in Yumaguzinsky Selsoviet, Kugarchinsky District, Bashkortostan, Russia. The population was 26 as of 2010. There are 2 streets.

== Geography ==
Ulutup is located 34 km northwest of Mrakovo (the district's administrative centre) by road. Yumaguzino is the nearest rural locality.
