= Davletshinsky =

Davletshinsky Давлетшинский
- Village
- Location within Bashkortostan Location within Russia
- Coordinates: 52°47′N 56°25′E
- Country: Russia
- Region: Bashkortostan
- District: Kugarchinsky District
- Time zone: UTC+5:00

Davletshinsky (Russian: Давлетшинский; Bashkir: Дәүләтша, Däwlätşa) is a rural locality (a village) in Zarechensky Selsoviet, Kugarchinsky District, Bashkortostan, Russia. The population was 32 as of 2010. There is 1 street.

== Geography ==
Davletshinsky is located 18 km northwest of Mrakovo (the district's administrative centre) by road. Voskresenskoye is the nearest rural locality.
