= Yetebulak =

Yetebulak Етебулак
- Village
- Location within Bashkortostan Location within Russia
- Coordinates: 52°27′N 56°37′E
- Country: Russia
- Region: Bashkortostan
- District: Kugarchinsky District
- Time zone: UTC+5:00

Yetebulak (Russian: Етебулак; Bashkir: Етеболаҡ, Yetebolaq) is a rural locality (a village) in Kugarchinsky Selsoviet, Kugarchinsky District, Bashkortostan, Russia. The population was 131 as of 2010. There is 1 street.

== Geography ==
Yetebulak is located 49 km south of Mrakovo (the district's administrative centre) by road. Semirechye is the nearest rural locality.
