= Nurdavletovo =

Nurdavletovo Нурдавлетово
- Village
- Location within Bashkortostan Location within Russia
- Coordinates: 53°16′N 55°59′E
- Country: Russia
- Region: Bashkortostan
- District: Meleuzovsky District
- Time zone: UTC+5:00

Nurdavletovo (Russian: Нурдавлетово; Bashkir: Нурдәүләт, Nurdäwlät) is a rural locality (a village) in Zirgansky Selsoviet, Meleuzovsky District, Bashkortostan, Russia. The population was 102 as of 2010. There are 9 streets.

== Geography ==
Nurdavletovo is located 43 km north of Meleuz (the district's administrative centre) by road. Sabashevo is the nearest rural locality.
