= Salikhovo, Kugarchinsky District, Republic of Bashkortostan =

Salikhovo Салихово
- Village
- Location within Bashkortostan Location within Russia
- Coordinates: 52°33′N 56°31′E
- Country: Russia
- Region: Bashkortostan
- District: Kugarchinsky District
- Time zone: UTC+5:00

Salikhovo (Russian: Салихово; Bashkir: Сәлих, Sälix) is a rural locality (a village) in Isimovsky Selsoviet, Kugarchinsky District, Bashkortostan, Russia. The population was 87 as of 2010. There is 1 street.

== Geography ==
Salikhovo is located 23 km southwest of Mrakovo (the district's administrative centre) by road. Maloisimovo is the nearest rural locality.
