= Seryat =

Seryat Серять
- Khutor
- Location within Bashkortostan Location within Russia
- Coordinates: 53°00′N 56°30′E
- Country: Russia
- Region: Bashkortostan
- District: Meleuzovsky District
- Time zone: UTC+5:00

Seryat (Russian: Серять; Bashkir: Һирәт, Hirät) is a rural locality (a khutor) in Ishtuganovsky Selsoviet, Meleuzovsky District, Bashkortostan, Russia. The population was 8 as of 2010. There is 1 street.

== Geography ==
Seryat is located 49 km east of Meleuz (the district's administrative centre) by road. Verkhnebikkuzino is the nearest rural locality.
