= 1st Tupchanovo =

1st Tupchanovo 1-е Тупчаново 1-се Төпсән 1-se Töpsän
- Village
- Location within Bashkortostan Location within Russia
- Coordinates: 52.664167°N 56.735833°E
- Country: Russia
- Region: Bashkortostan
- District: Kugarchinsky District
- Time zone: UTC+05:00

1st Tupchanovo (Russian: 1-е Тупчаново; Bashkir: 1-се Төпсән, 1-se Töpsän) is a rural locality (a village) in Yuldybaievsky Selsoviet of Kugarchinsky District, Russia. The population was 126 as of 2010.

== Geography ==
1st Tupchanovo is located 12 km southeast of Mrakovo (the district's administrative centre) by road. Ibragimovo is the nearest rural locality.

== Ethnicity ==
The village is inhabited by Bashkirs and others.

== Streets ==
- Davletova
- Z. Validi
- Olo Ik
