= Khlebodarovka, Meleuzovsky District, Republic of Bashkortostan =

Khlebodarovka Хлебодаровка
- Selo
- Location within Bashkortostan Location within Russia
- Coordinates: 53°03′N 56°19′E
- Country: Russia
- Region: Bashkortostan
- District: Meleuzovsky District
- Time zone: UTC+5:00

Khlebodarovka (Russian: Хлебодаровка) is a rural locality (a selo) in Alexandrovsky Selsoviet, Meleuzovsky District, Bashkortostan, Russia. The population was 253 as of 2010. There are 2 streets.

== Geography ==
Khlebodarovka is located 36 km northeast of Meleuz (the district's administrative centre) by road. Andreyevsky is the nearest rural locality.
