= Tyulebayevo =

Tyulebayevo Тюлебаево
- Village
- Location within Bashkortostan Location within Russia
- Coordinates: 52°51′N 56°33′E
- Country: Russia
- Region: Bashkortostan
- District: Kugarchinsky District
- Time zone: UTC+5:00

Tyulebayevo (Russian: Тюлебаево; Bashkir: Түләбай, Tüläbay) is a rural locality (a village) in Irtyubaksky Selsoviet, Kugarchinsky District, Bashkortostan, Russia. The population was 159 as of 2010. There are 3 streets.

== Geography ==
Tyulebayevo is located 19 km north of Mrakovo (the district's administrative centre) by road. Gavrilovka is the nearest rural locality.
