= Ishtuganovo =

Ishtuganovo Иштуганово
- Village
- Location within Bashkortostan Location within Russia
- Coordinates: 52°58′N 56°26′E
- Country: Russia
- Region: Bashkortostan
- District: Meleuzovsky District
- Time zone: UTC+5:00

Ishtuganovo (Russian: Иштуганово; Bashkir: Иштуған, İştuğan) is a rural locality (a village) and the administrative centre of Ishtuganovsky Selsoviet, Meleuzovsky District, Bashkortostan, Russia. The population was 339 as of 2010. There are 3 streets.

== Geography ==
Ishtuganovo is located 45 km east of Meleuz (the district's administrative centre) by road. Mutayevo is the nearest rural locality.
