= Tashlykul, Meleuzovsky District, Republic of Bashkortostan =

Tashlykul Ташлыкуль
- Village
- Location within Bashkortostan Location within Russia
- Coordinates: 52°54′N 55°57′E
- Country: Russia
- Region: Bashkortostan
- District: Meleuzovsky District
- Time zone: UTC+5:00

Tashlykul (Russian: Ташлыкуль; Bashkir: Ташлыкүл, Taşlıkül) is a rural locality (a village) in Meleuzovsky Selsoviet, Meleuzovsky District, Bashkortostan, Russia. The population was 141 as of 2010. There are 17 streets.

== Geography ==
Tashlykul is located 8 km south of Meleuz (the district's administrative centre) by road. Tamyan is the nearest rural locality.
