= Karan, Meleuzovsky District, Republic of Bashkortostan =

Karan Каран
- Village
- Location within Bashkortostan Location within Russia
- Coordinates: 52°55′N 55°54′E
- Country: Russia
- Region: Bashkortostan
- District: Meleuzovsky District
- Time zone: UTC+5:00

Karan (Russian: Каран; Bashkir: Ҡаран, Qaran) is a rural locality (a village) and the administrative centre of Meleuzovsky Selsoviet, Meleuzovsky District, Bashkortostan, Russia. The population was 377 as of 2010. There are 7 streets.

== Geography ==
Karan is located 4 km south of Meleuz (the district's administrative centre) by road. Kuzminskoye is the nearest rural locality.
