= Aytugan, Meleuzovsky District, Republic of Bashkortostan =

Aytugan Айтуган
- Village
- Location within Bashkortostan Location within Russia
- Coordinates: 53°01′N 55°58′E
- Country: Russia
- Region: Bashkortostan
- District: Meleuzovsky District
- Time zone: UTC+5:00

Aytugan (Russian: Айтуган; Bashkir: Айтуған, Aytuğan) is a rural locality (a village) in Meleuzovsky Selsoviet, Meleuzovsky District, Bashkortostan, Russia. The population was 107 as of 2010. There is 1 street.

== Geography ==
Aytugan is located 11 km northeast of Meleuz (the district's administrative centre) by road. Malomukachevo is the nearest rural locality.
