= Shcherbaki =

Shcherbaki Щербаки
- Khutor
- Location within Bashkortostan Location within Russia
- Coordinates: 52°41′N 57°03′E
- Country: Russia
- Region: Bashkortostan
- District: Kugarchinsky District
- Time zone: UTC+5:00

Shcherbaki (Russian: Щербаки) is a rural locality (a khutor) in Poboishchensky Selsoviet, Kugarchinsky District, Bashkortostan, Russia. The population was 18 as of 2010. There is 1 street.

== Geography ==
Shcherbaki is located 47 km east of Mrakovo (the district's administrative centre) by road. Poboishche is the nearest rural locality.
