= Aygay-Mursalyay =

Aygay-Mursalyay Айгай-Мурсаляй
- Village
- Location within Bashkortostan Location within Russia
- Coordinates: 52°21′N 56°28′E
- Country: Russia
- Region: Bashkortostan
- District: Kugarchinsky District
- Time zone: UTC+5:00

Aygay-Mursalyay (Russian: Айгай-Мурсаляй; Bashkir: Айһай-Мөрсәләй, Ayhay-Mörsäläy) is a rural locality (a village) in Maxyutovsky Selsoviet, Kugarchinsky District, Bashkortostan, Russia. The population was 13 as of 2010. There is 1 street.

== Geography ==
Aygay-Mursalyay is located 46 km south of Mrakovo (the district's administrative centre) by road. Tuyembetovo is the nearest rural locality.
