= Zireklya =

Zireklya Зирекля
- Village
- Location within Bashkortostan Location within Russia
- Coordinates: 52°17′N 56°34′E
- Country: Russia
- Region: Bashkortostan
- District: Kugarchinsky District
- Time zone: UTC+5:00

Zireklya (Russian: Зирекля; Bashkir: Ерекле, Yerekle) is a rural locality (a village) in Maxyutovsky Selsoviet, Kugarchinsky District, Bashkortostan, Russia. The population was 186 as of 2010. There are 2 streets.

== Geography ==
Zireklya is located 62 km south of Mrakovo (the district's administrative centre) by road. Maxyutovo is the nearest rural locality.
