= Staromusino, Meleuzovsky District, Republic of Bashkortostan =

Staromusino Старомусино
- Village
- Location within Bashkortostan Location within Russia
- Coordinates: 52°54′N 55°58′E
- Country: Russia
- Region: Bashkortostan
- District: Meleuzovsky District
- Time zone: UTC+5:00

Staromusino (Russian: Старомусино; Bashkir: Иҫке Муса, İśke Musa) is a rural locality (a village) in Pervomaysky Selsoviet, Meleuzovsky District, Bashkortostan, Russia. The population was 66 as of 2010. There is 1 street.

== Geography ==
Staromusino is located 12 km southeast of Meleuz (the district's administrative centre) by road. Pervomayskaya is the nearest rural locality.
