= Vostochny, Republic of Bashkortostan =

Vostochny Восточный
- Village
- Location within Bashkortostan Location within Russia
- Coordinates: 52°57′N 56°17′E
- Country: Russia
- Region: Bashkortostan
- District: Meleuzovsky District
- Time zone: UTC+5:00

Vostochny (Russian: Восточный) is a rural locality (a village) in Abitovsky Selsoviet, Meleuzovsky District, Bashkortostan, Russia. The population was 328 as of 2010. There are 11 streets.

== Geography ==
Vostochny is located 31 km east of Meleuz (the district's administrative centre) by road. Basurmanovka is the nearest rural locality.
