= Aptrakovo =

Aptrakovo Аптраково
- Village
- Location within Bashkortostan Location within Russia
- Coordinates: 52°53′N 56°10′E
- Country: Russia
- Region: Bashkortostan
- District: Meleuzovsky District
- Time zone: UTC+5:00

Aptrakovo (Russian: Аптраково; Bashkir: Аптраҡ, Aptraq) is a rural locality (a village) and the administrative centre of Aptrakovsky Selsoviet, Meleuzovsky District, Bashkortostan, Russia. The population was 312 as of 2010. There are 7 streets.

== Geography ==
Aptrakovo is located 26 km southeast of Meleuz (the district's administrative centre) by road. Mullagulovo is the nearest rural locality.
