= Yulbashevo =

Yulbashevo Юлбашево
- Village
- Location within Bashkortostan Location within Russia
- Coordinates: 52°47′N 56°06′E
- Country: Russia
- Region: Bashkortostan
- District: Kugarchinsky District
- Time zone: UTC+5:00

Yulbashevo (Russian: Юлбашево; Bashkir: Юлбаш, Yulbaş) is a rural locality (a village) in Yalchinsky Selsoviet, Kugarchinsky District, Bashkortostan, Russia. The population was 35 as of 2010. There is 1 street.

== Geography ==
Yulbashevo is located 41 km northwest of Mrakovo (the district's administrative centre) by road. Yadgarovo is the nearest rural locality.
