= Bustubayevo =

Bustubayevo Бустубаево
- Village
- Location within Bashkortostan Location within Russia
- Coordinates: 52°31′N 56°38′E
- Country: Russia
- Region: Bashkortostan
- District: Kugarchinsky District
- Time zone: UTC+5:00

Bustubayevo (Russian: Бустубаево; Bashkir: Буҫтыбай, Buśtıbay) is a rural locality (a village) in Nukayevsky Selsoviet, Kugarchinsky District, Bashkortostan, Russia. The population was 83 as of 2010. There are 2 streets.

== Geography ==
Bustubayevo is located 30 km south of Mrakovo (the district's administrative centre) by road. 1-ye Tukatovo is the nearest rural locality.
