= Mutayevo =

Mutayevo Мутаево
- Village
- Location within Bashkortostan Location within Russia
- Coordinates: 52°57′N 56°22′E
- Country: Russia
- Region: Bashkortostan
- District: Meleuzovsky District
- Time zone: UTC+5:00

Mutayevo (Russian: Мутаево; Bashkir: Мотай, Motay) is a rural locality (a village) in Saryshevsky Selsoviet, Meleuzovsky District, Bashkortostan, Russia. The population was 153 as of 2010. There are three streets.

== Geography ==
Mutayevo is located 41 km east of Meleuz (the district's administrative centre) by road. Narbutovo is the nearest rural locality.
