= Novokhvalynsky =

Novokhvalynsky Новохвалынский
- Khutor
- Location within Bashkortostan Location within Russia
- Coordinates: 52°37′N 56°44′E
- Country: Russia
- Region: Bashkortostan
- District: Kugarchinsky District
- Time zone: UTC+5:00

Novokhvalynsky (Russian: Новохвалынский; Bashkir: Яңы Хвалын, Yañı Xvalın) is a rural locality (a khutor) in Yuldybayevsky Selsoviet, Kugarchinsky District, Bashkortostan, Russia. The population was 317 as of 2010.

== Geography ==
Novokhvalynsky is located 14 km southeast of Mrakovo (the district's administrative centre) by road. Yuldybay is the nearest rural locality.
