= Malomukachevo =

Malomukachevo Маломукачево
- Village
- Location within Bashkortostan Location within Russia
- Coordinates: 53°01′N 55°57′E
- Country: Russia
- Region: Bashkortostan
- District: Meleuzovsky District
- Time zone: UTC+5:00

Malomukachevo (Russian: Маломукачево; Bashkir: Бәләкәй Моҡас, Bäläkäy Moqas) is a rural locality (a village) in Meleuzovsky Selsoviet, Meleuzovsky District, Bashkortostan, Russia. The population was 193 as of 2010. There is 1 street.

== Geography ==
Malomukachevo is located 9 km north of Meleuz (the district's administrative centre) by road. Kutushevo is the nearest rural locality.
