= Aznagulovo, Kugarchinsky District, Republic of Bashkortostan =

Aznagulovo Азнагулово
- Village
- Location within Bashkortostan Location within Russia
- Coordinates: 52°38′N 56°14′E
- Country: Russia
- Region: Bashkortostan
- District: Kugarchinsky District
- Time zone: UTC+5:00

Aznagulovo (Russian: Азнагулово; Bashkir: Аҙнағол, Aźnağol) is a rural locality (a village) in Tlyaumbetovsky Selsoviet, Kugarchinsky District, Bashkortostan, Russia. The population was 180 as of 2010. There is 1 street.

== Geography ==
Aznagulovo is located 45 km west of Mrakovo (the district's administrative centre) by road. Chernigovsky is the nearest rural locality.
