= Daut-Kayupovo =

Daut-Kayupovo Даут-Каюпово
- Village
- Location within Bashkortostan Location within Russia
- Coordinates: 52°36′N 56°13′E
- Country: Russia
- Region: Bashkortostan
- District: Kugarchinsky District
- Time zone: UTC+5:00

Daut-Kayupovo (Russian: Даут-Каюпово; Bashkir: Дауыт-Ҡайып, Däwıt-Qayıp) is a rural locality (a village) in Tlyaumbetovsky Selsoviet, Kugarchinsky District, Bashkortostan, Russia. The population was 141 as of 2010. There are 2 streets.

== Geography ==
Daut-Kayupovo is located 47 km southwest of Mrakovo (the district's administrative centre) by road. Aznagulovo is the nearest rural locality.
