= Nizhnesapashevo =

Nizhnesapashevo Нижнесапашево
- Village
- Location within Bashkortostan Location within Russia
- Coordinates: 52°50′N 56°08′E
- Country: Russia
- Region: Bashkortostan
- District: Kugarchinsky District
- Time zone: UTC+5:00

Nizhnesapashevo (Russian: Нижнесапашево; Bashkir: Түбәнге Һапаш, Tübänge Hapaş) is a rural locality (a village) in Yalchinsky Selsoviet, Kugarchinsky District, Bashkortostan, Russia. The population was 296 as of 2010. There are 2 streets.

== Geography ==
Nizhnesapashevo is located 43 km northwest of Mrakovo (the district's administrative centre) by road. Yalchino is the nearest rural locality.
