= Uzya =

Uzya Узя
- Village
- Location within Bashkortostan Location within Russia
- Coordinates: 52°58′N 56°03′E
- Country: Russia
- Region: Bashkortostan
- District: Meleuzovsky District
- Time zone: UTC+5:00

Uzya (Russian: Узя; Bashkir: Ужа, Uja) is a rural locality (a village) in Pervomaysky Selsoviet, Meleuzovsky District, Bashkortostan, Russia. The population was 242 as of 2010. There are 4 streets.

== Geography ==
Uzya is located 14 km northeast of Meleuz (the district's administrative centre) by road. Samaro-Ivanovka is the nearest rural locality.
