= Urakayevo =

Urakayevo Уракаево
- Village
- Location within Bashkortostan Location within Russia
- Coordinates: 52°43′N 56°27′E
- Country: Russia
- Region: Bashkortostan
- District: Kugarchinsky District
- Time zone: UTC+5:00

Urakayevo (Russian: Уракаево; Bashkir: Ураҡай, Uraqay) is a rural locality (a village) in Ibrayevsky Selsoviet, Kugarchinsky District, Bashkortostan, Russia. The population was 91 as of 2010. There are 3 streets.

== Geography ==
Urakayevo is located 17 km west of Mrakovo (the district's administrative centre) by road. Irtyubyak is the nearest rural locality.
