= Kochkar =

Kochkar Кочкарь
- Khutor
- Location within Bashkortostan Location within Russia
- Coordinates: 53°04′N 56°04′E
- Country: Russia
- Region: Bashkortostan
- District: Meleuzovsky District
- Time zone: UTC+5:00

Kochkar (Russian: Кочкарь; Bashkir: Ҡусҡар, Qusqar) is a rural locality (a khutor) in Voskresensky Selsoviet, Meleuzovsky District, Bashkortostan, Russia. The population was 32 as of 2010. There is 1 street.

== Geography ==
Kochkar is located 22 km northeast of Meleuz (the district's administrative centre) by road. Smakovo is the nearest rural locality.
