= Davletkulovo 1-ye =

Davletkulovo 1-ye Давлеткулово 1-е
- Village
- Location within Bashkortostan Location within Russia
- Coordinates: 52°26′N 56°37′E
- Country: Russia
- Region: Bashkortostan
- District: Kugarchinsky District
- Time zone: UTC+5:00

Davletkulovo 1-ye (Russian: Давлеткулово 1-е; Bashkir: 1-се Дәүләтҡол, 1-se Däwlätqol) is a rural locality (a village) in Kugarchinsky Selsoviet, Kugarchinsky District, Bashkortostan, Russia. The population was 75 as of 2010. There is 1 street.

== Geography ==
Davletkulovo 1-ye is located 47 km south of Mrakovo (the district's administrative centre) by road. Semirechye is the nearest rural locality.
