= Kashalya =

Kashalya Кашаля
- Village
- Location within Bashkortostan Location within Russia
- Coordinates: 53°09′N 56°50′E
- Country: Russia
- Region: Bashkortostan
- District: Meleuzovsky District
- Time zone: UTC+5:00

Kashalya (Russian: Кашаля; Bashkir: Кәшәлә, Käşäle) is a rural locality (a village) in Nugushevsky Selsoviet, Meleuzovsky District, Bashkortostan, Russia. The population was 1 as of 2010. There is 1 street.

== Geography ==
Kashalya is located 227 km northeast of Meleuz (the district's administrative centre) by road. Verkhny Nugush is the nearest rural locality.

== See also ==
- Bashkortostan, region of Kashalya
