= Nizhneye Sazovo =

Nizhneye Sazovo Нижнее Сазово
- Village
- Location within Bashkortostan Location within Russia
- Coordinates: 52°22′N 56°33′E
- Country: Russia
- Region: Bashkortostan
- District: Kugarchinsky District
- Time zone: UTC+5:00

Nizhneye Sazovo (Russian: Нижнее Сазово; Bashkir: Түбәнге Һаҙ, Tübänge Haź) is a rural locality (a village) in Maxyutovsky Selsoviet, Kugarchinsky District, Bashkortostan, Russia. The population was 59 as of 2010. There is 1 street.

== Geography ==
Nizhneye Sazovo is located 48 km south of Mrakovo (the district's administrative centre) by road. Ardatovo is the nearest rural locality.
