= Novotroyevka, Meleuzovsky District, Republic of Bashkortostan =

Novotroyevka Новотроевка
- Village
- Location within Bashkortostan Location within Russia
- Coordinates: 53°09′N 55°44′E
- Country: Russia
- Region: Bashkortostan
- District: Meleuzovsky District
- Time zone: UTC+5:00

Novotroyevka (Russian: Новотроевка) is a rural locality (a village) in Nordovsky Selsoviet, Meleuzovsky District, Bashkortostan, Russia. The population was 6 as of 2010. There is 1 street.

== Geography ==
Novotroyevka is located 50 km northwest of Meleuz (the district's administrative centre) by road. Varvarino is the nearest rural locality.
