= Almyasovo =

Almyasovo Альмясово
- Village
- Location within Bashkortostan Location within Russia
- Coordinates: 52°48′N 56°35′E
- Country: Russia
- Region: Bashkortostan
- District: Kugarchinsky District
- Time zone: UTC+5:00

Almyasovo (Russian: Альмясово; Bashkir: Әлмәс, Älmäs) is a rural locality (a village) in Ibrayevsky Selsoviet, Kugarchinsky District, Bashkortostan, Russia. The population was 301 as of 2010. There are 5 streets.

== Geography ==
Almyasovo is located 12 km north of Mrakovo (the district's administrative centre) by road. Tyulebayevo is the nearest rural locality.
