= Narbutovo =

Narbutovo Нарбутово
- Village
- Location within Bashkortostan Location within Russia
- Coordinates: 52°56′N 56°23′E
- Country: Russia
- Region: Bashkortostan
- District: Kugarchinsky District
- Time zone: UTC+5:00

Narbutovo (Russian: Нарбутово; Bashkir: Нарбут, Narbut) is a rural locality (a village) in Yumaguzinsky Selsoviet, Kugarchinsky District, Bashkortostan, Russia. The population was 24 as of 2010. There is 1 street.

== Geography ==
Narbutovo is located 39 km northwest of Mrakovo (the district's administrative centre) by road. Yumaguzino is the nearest rural locality.
