= Petropavlovka, Meleuzovsky District, Republic of Bashkortostan =

Petropavlovka Петропавловка
- Village
- Location within Bashkortostan Location within Russia
- Coordinates: 53°06′N 55°41′E
- Country: Russia
- Region: Bashkortostan
- District: Meleuzovsky District
- Time zone: UTC+5:00

Petropavlovka (Russian: Петропавловка) is a rural locality (a village) in Denisovsky Selsoviet, Meleuzovsky District, Bashkortostan, Russia. The population was 209 as of 2010. There is 1 street.

== Geography ==
Petropavlovka is located 28 km northwest of Meleuz (the district's administrative centre) by road. Novaya Kazankovka is the nearest rural locality.
