= Verkhnebikkuzino =

Verkhnebikkuzino Верхнебиккузино
- Village
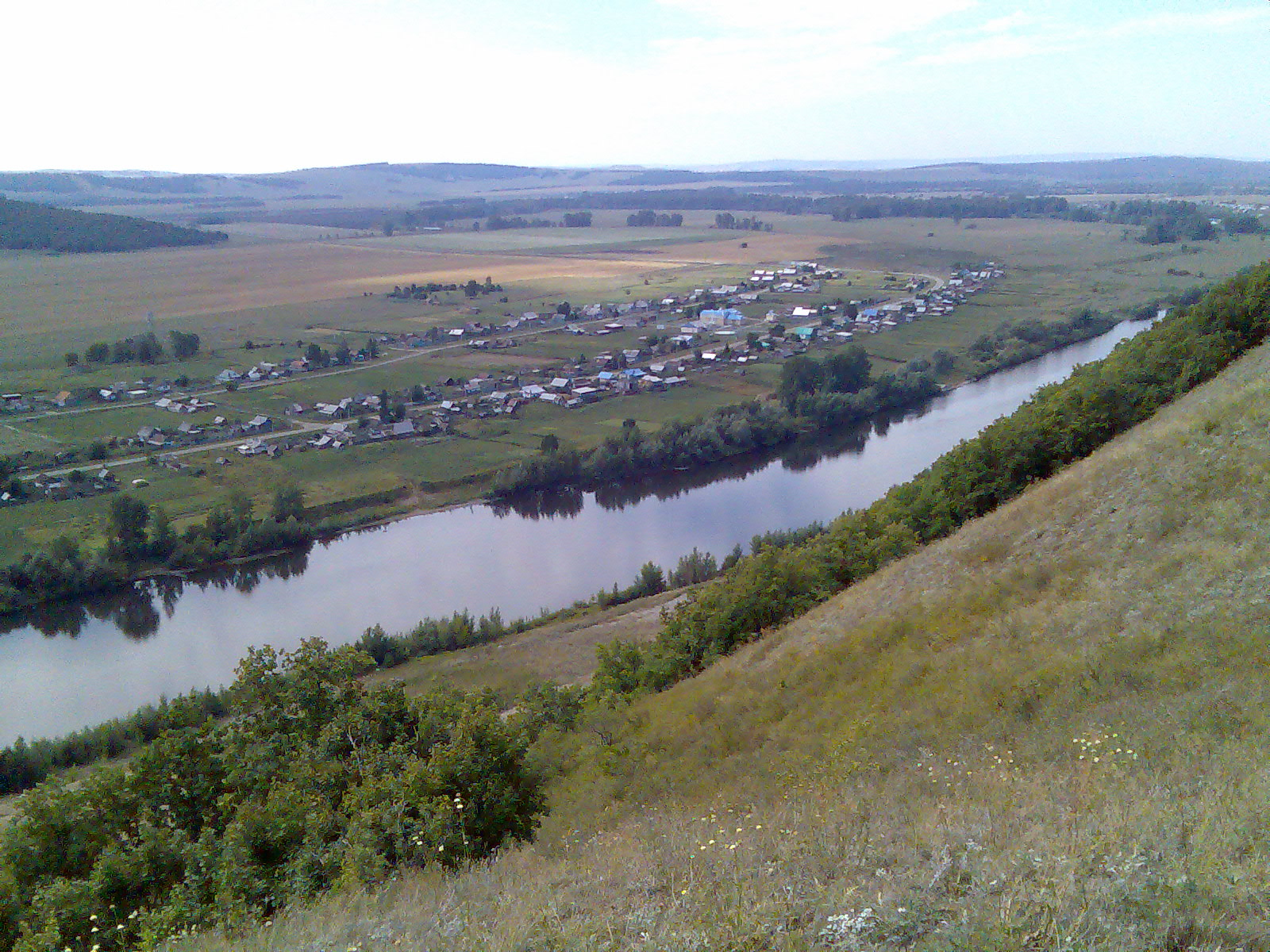
- Verhnebikkuzino

- Location within Bashkortostan Location within Russia
- Coordinates: 52°59′N 56°31′E
- Country: Russia
- Region: Bashkortostan
- District: Kugarchinsky District
- Time zone: UTC+5:00

Verkhnebikkuzino (Russian: Верхнебиккузино; Bashkir: Үрге Бикҡужа, Ürge Bikquja) is a rural locality (a village) in Nizhnebikkuzinsky Selsoviet, Kugarchinsky District, Bashkortostan, Russia. The population was 214 as of 2010. There are 3 streets.

== Geography ==
Verkhnebikkuzino is located 50 km north of Mrakovo (the district's administrative centre) by road. Syrtlanovo is the nearest rural locality.
