= Yalchino, Yalchinsky Selsoviet, Kugarchinsky District, Republic of Bashkortostan =

Yalchino Ялчино
- Village
- Location within Bashkortostan Location within Russia
- Coordinates: 52°50′N 56°06′E
- Country: Russia
- Region: Bashkortostan
- District: Kugarchinsky District
- Time zone: UTC+5:00

Yalchino (Russian: Ялчино; Bashkir: Ялсы, Yalsı) is a rural locality (a village) and the administrative centre of Yalchinsky Selsoviet, Kugarchinsky District, Bashkortostan, Russia. The population was 222 as of 2010.

== Geography ==
It is located 52 km from Mrakovo.
