= Petropavlovka, Zaigrayevsky District, Republic of Buryatia =

Petropavlovka Петропавловка
- Selo
- Location within Republic of Buryatia Location within Russia
- Coordinates: 52°02′N 108°29′E
- Country: Russia
- Region: Republic of Buryatia
- District: Zaigrayevsky District
- Time zone: UTC+8:00

Petropavlovka (Russian: Петропавловка) is a rural locality (a selo) in Zaigrayevsky District, Republic of Buryatia, Russia. The population was 65 as of 2010.

== Geography ==
Petropavlovka is located 36 km northeast of Zaigrayevo (the district's administrative centre) by road. Novaya Kurba is the nearest rural locality.
