= Petropavlovka, Gafuriysky District, Republic of Bashkortostan =

Petropavlovka Петропавловка
- Village
- Location within Bashkortostan Location within Russia
- Coordinates: 53°44′N 56°15′E
- Country: Russia
- Region: Bashkortostan
- District: Gafuriysky District
- Time zone: UTC+5:00

Petropavlovka (Russian: Петропавловка) is a rural locality (a village) in Burunovsky Selsoviet, Gafuriysky District, Bashkortostan, Russia. The population was 3 as of 2010. There is 1 street.

== Geography ==
Petropavlovka is located 30 km southwest of Krasnousolsky (the district's administrative centre) by road. Burunovka is the nearest rural locality.
