= Petropavlovka, Podgorensky District, Voronezh Oblast =

Petropavlovka Петропавловка
- Khutor
- Location within Voronezh Oblast Location within Russia
- Coordinates: 50°22′N 39°35′E
- Country: Russia
- Region: Voronezh Oblast
- District: Podgorensky District
- Time zone: UTC+3:00

Petropavlovka (Russian: Петропа́вловка) is a rural locality (a khutor) in Skororybskoye Rural Settlement, Podgorensky District, Voronezh Oblast, Russia. The population was 164 as of 2010. There are 4 streets.

== Geography ==
Petropavlovka is located 5 km southwest of Podgorensky (the district's administrative centre) by road, on the right bank of the Gnilaya Rossosh River. Malaya Sudyovka is the nearest rural locality.
