= Petropavlovka, Arkharinsky District, Amur Oblast =

Petropavlovka Петропавловка
- Selo
- Location within Amur Oblast Location within Russia
- Coordinates: 49°33′N 129°56′E
- Country: Russia
- Region: Amur Oblast
- District: Arkharinsky District
- Time zone: UTC+9:00

Petropavlovka (Russian: Петропавловка) is a rural locality (a selo) in Chernigovsky Selsoviet of Arkharinsky District, Amur Oblast, Russia. The population was 1 as of 2018. There is 1 street.

== Geography ==
Petropavlovka is located 34 km northwest of Arkhara (the district's administrative centre) by road.
