= Petropavlovka, Ivanovsky District, Amur Oblast =

Petropavlovka Петропавловка
- Selo
- Location within Amur Oblast Location within Russia
- Coordinates: 50°30′N 127°48′E
- Country: Russia
- Region: Amur Oblast
- District: Ivanovsky District
- Time zone: UTC+9:00

Petropavlovka (Russian: Петропавловка) is a rural locality (a selo) in Petropavlovsky Selsoviet of Ivanovsky District, Amur Oblast, Russia. The population was 731 as of 2018. There are 10 streets.

== Geography ==
Petropavlovka is located 38 km northwest of Ivanovka (the district's administrative centre) by road. Bogorodskoye is the nearest rural locality.
