= Petropavlovka, Svobodnensky District, Amur Oblast =

Petropavlovka Новостепановка
- Selo
- Location within Amur Oblast Location within Russia
- Coordinates: 51°06′N 126°55′E
- Country: Russia
- Region: Amur Oblast
- District: Svobodnensky District
- Time zone: UTC+9:00 (CET)

Petropavlovka (Russian: Петропавловка) is a rural locality (a selo) in Petropavlovsky Selsoviet of Svobodnensky District, Amur Oblast, Russia. The population is 69 as of 2018.

== Geography ==
The village is located on the left bank of the Amur River, 113 km west of Svobodny.
