= Petropavlovka, Mikhaylovsky District, Amur Oblast =

Petropavlovka Петропавловка
- Selo
- Location within Amur Oblast Location within Russia
- Coordinates: 49°58′N 128°54′E
- Country: Russia
- Region: Amur Oblast
- District: Mikhaylovsky District
- Time zone: UTC+9:00

Petropavlovka (Russian: Петропавловка) is a rural locality (a selo) in Mikhaylovsky Selsoviet of Mikhaylovsky District, Amur Oblast, Russia. The population was 218 as of 2018. There are 6 streets.

== Geography ==
Petropavlovka is located on the left bank of the Zavitaya River, 55 km northeast of Poyarkovo (the district's administrative centre) by road. Arsentyevka is the nearest rural locality.
