= Petropavlovka, Bichursky District, Republic of Buryatia =

Petropavlovka Петропавловка
- Selo
- Location within Republic of Buryatia Location within Russia
- Coordinates: 50°41′N 107°31′E
- Country: Russia
- Region: Republic of Buryatia
- District: Bichursky District
- Time zone: UTC+8:00

Petropavlovka (Russian: Петропавловка) is a rural locality (a selo) in Bichursky District, Republic of Buryatia, Russia. The population was 608 as of 2010. There are 6 streets.

== Geography ==
Petropavlovka is located 15 km north of Bichura (the district's administrative centre) by road. Altachey is the nearest rural locality.
