= Petropavlovka, Sterlitamaksky District, Republic of Bashkortostan =

Petropavlovka Петропавловка
- Village
- Location within Bashkortostan Location within Russia
- Coordinates: 53°45′N 55°39′E
- Country: Russia
- Region: Bashkortostan
- District: Sterlitamaksky District
- Time zone: UTC+5:00

Petropavlovka (Russian: Петропавловка) is a rural locality (a village) in Burikazganovsky Selsoviet, Sterlitamaksky District, Bashkortostan, Russia. The population was 12 as of 2010. There is 1 street.

== Geography ==
Petropavlovka is located 29 km northwest of Sterlitamak (the district's administrative centre) by road. Sadovka is the nearest rural locality.
