= Petropavlovka, Miyakinsky District, Republic of Bashkortostan =

Petropavlovka Петропавловка
- Village
- Location within Bashkortostan Location within Russia
- Coordinates: 53°24′N 54°49′E
- Country: Russia
- Region: Bashkortostan
- District: Miyakinsky District
- Time zone: UTC+5:00

Petropavlovka (Russian: Петропавловка) is a rural locality (a village) in Kacheganovsky Selsoviet, Miyakinsky District, Bashkortostan, Russia. The population was 46 as of 2010. There are 4 streets.

== Geography ==
Petropavlovka is located 29 km south of Kirgiz-Miyaki (the district's administrative centre) by road. Akyar is the nearest rural locality.
