= Petropavlovka, Arkhangelsky District, Republic of Bashkortostan =

Petropavlovka Петропавловка
- Village
- Location within Bashkortostan Location within Russia
- Coordinates: 54°23′N 57°05′E
- Country: Russia
- Region: Bashkortostan
- District: Arkhangelsky District
- Time zone: UTC+5:00

Petropavlovka (Russian: Петропавловка) is a rural locality (a village) in Bakaldinsky Selsoviet, Arkhangelsky District, Bashkortostan, Russia. The population was 14 as of 2010. There is 1 street.

== Geography ==
Petropavlovka is located 24 km east of Arkhangelskoye (the district's administrative centre) by road. Usakly is the nearest rural locality.
