= Petropavlovka, Askinsky District, Republic of Bashkortostan =

Village in Askinsky District, Bashkortostan, Russia

Petropavlovka Петропавловка
- Village
- Location within Bashkortostan Location within Russia
- Coordinates: 56°05′N 56°25′E
- Country: Russia
- Region: Bashkortostan
- District: Askinsky District
- Time zone: UTC+5:00

Petropavlovka (Russian: Петропавловка) is a rural locality (a village) and the administrative center of Petropavlovsky Selsoviet, Askinsky District, Bashkortostan, Russia. The population was 184 as of 2010. There are 6 streets.

== Geography ==
Petropavlovka is located 12 km east of Askino (the district's administrative centre) by road. Davlyatovka is the nearest rural locality.
