= Petropavlovka, Volgograd Oblast =

Petropavlovka Петропавловка
- Selo
- Location within Volgograd Oblast Location within Russia
- Coordinates: 49°26′N 44°31′E
- Country: Russia
- Region: Volgograd Oblast
- District: Dubovsky District
- Time zone: UTC+4:00

Petropavlovka (Russian: Петропавловка) is a rural locality (a selo) in Maloivanovskoye Rural Settlement, Dubovsky District, Volgograd Oblast, Russia. The population was 84 as of 2010.

== Geography ==
Petropavlovka is located in steppe, on the left bank of the Berdiya River, 66 km northwest of Dubovka (the district's administrative centre) by road. Ust-Pogozhye is the nearest rural locality.
