= Petropavlovka, Astrakhan Oblast =

Petropavlovka Петропавловка
- Selo
- Location within Astrakhan Oblast Location within Russia
- Coordinates: 46°50′N 47°46′E
- Country: Russia
- Region: Astrakhan Oblast
- District: Narimanovsky District
- Time zone: UTC+4:00

Petropavlovka (Russian: Петропавловка) is a rural locality (a selo) in Baranovsky Selsoviet, Narimanovsky District, Astrakhan Oblast, Russia. The population was 375 as of 2010. There are 10 streets.

== Geography ==
Petropavlovka is located 23 km north of Narimanov (the district's administrative centre) by road. Baranovka is the nearest rural locality.
