= Petropavlovka, Tatyshlinsky District, Republic of Bashkortostan =

Petropavlovka Петропавловка
- Village
- Location within Bashkortostan Location within Russia
- Coordinates: 56°09′N 56°03′E
- Country: Russia
- Region: Bashkortostan
- District: Tatyshlinsky District
- Time zone: UTC+5:00

Petropavlovka (Russian: Петропавловка) is a rural locality (a village) in Kalmiyarovsky Selsoviet, Tatyshlinsky District, Bashkortostan, Russia. The population was 291 as of 2010. There are 5 streets.

== Geography ==
Petropavlovka is located 22 km southeast of Verkhniye Tatyshly (the district's administrative centre) by road. Starokalmiyarovo is the nearest rural locality.
