= Meleuz =

Town in Bashkortostan, Russia

Meleuz Мелеуз
- Town

Other transcription(s)
  - Bashkir: Мәләүез; Mäläwez
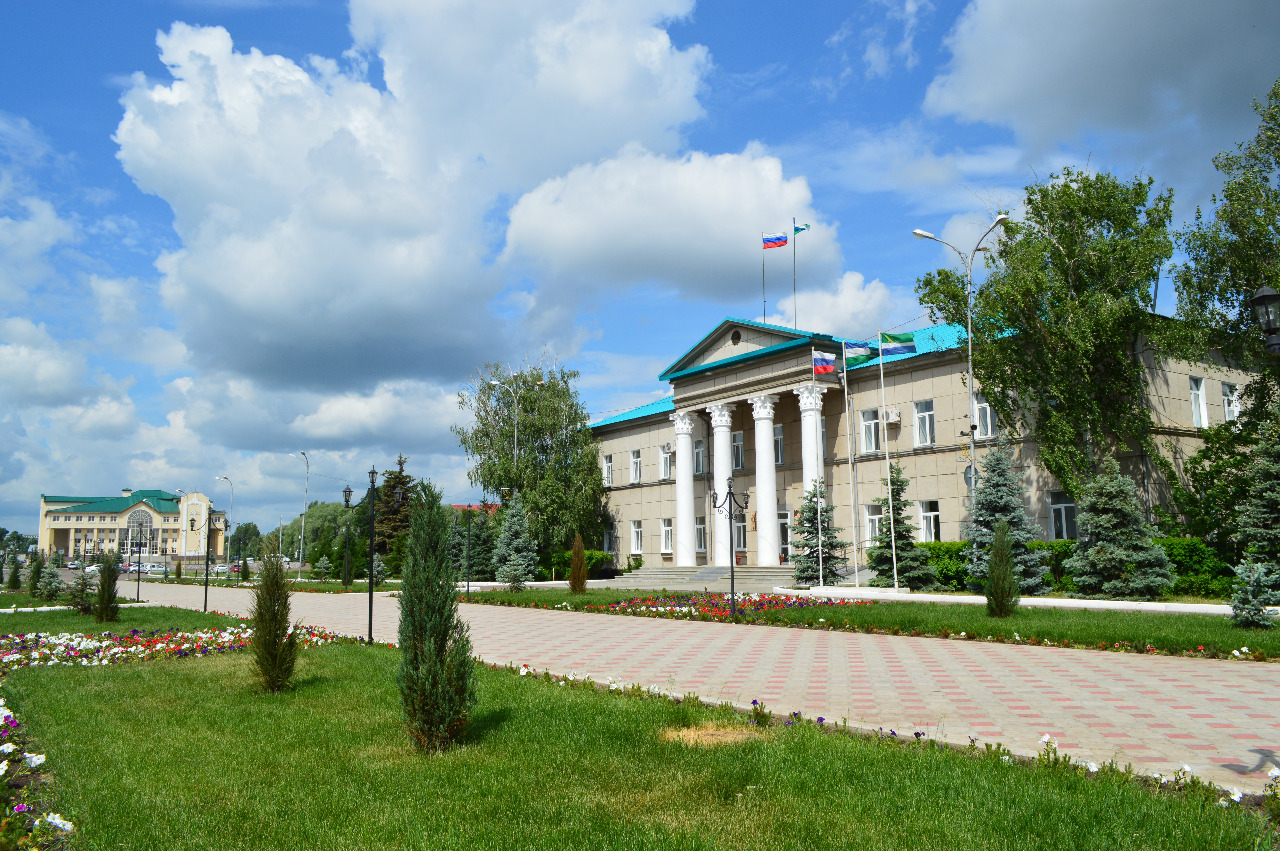

- Coat of arms
- Interactive map of Meleuz
- Location of Meleuz Meleuz (Bashkortostan)
- Coordinates: 52°57′N 55°56′E
- Country: Russia
- Federal subject: Bashkortostan
- Founded: 18th century

Area
  - Total: 32 km^{2} (12 sq mi)
- Elevation: 170 m (560 ft)

Population (2010 Census)
  - Total: 61,390
  - Estimate (2025): 54,847 (−10.7%)
  - Rank: 263rd in 2010
  - Density: 1,900/km^{2} (5,000/sq mi)

Administrative status
  - Subordinated to: town of republic significance of Meleuz
  - Capital of: Meleuzovsky District, town of republic significance of Meleuz

Municipal status
  - Municipal district: Meleuzovsky Municipal District
  - Urban settlement: Meleuz Urban Settlement
  - Capital of: Meleuzovsky Municipal District, Meleuz Urban Settlement
- Time zone: UTC+5 (MSK+2)
- Postal code: 453851
- Dialing code: +7 3473
- OKTMO ID: 80641101001

Meleuz (Russian: Мелеу́з; Bashkir: Мәләүез, Mäläwez) is a town in the Republic of Bashkortostan, Russia, located on the bank of the Belaya River, 205 km south of Ufa. Population: 61,390 (2010 census); 62,949 (2002 census); 53,448 (1989 Soviet census).

== History ==
It was a peasant village since 1786. In 1795, 434 people lived in the village, and in 1865, the village had 870 residents. The settlement started developing in the 1930s, when petroleum fields were discovered in the south of Bashkortostan and in the 1970s with the production of mineral fertilizers. It became a town in 1958.

== Administrative and municipal status ==
Within the framework of administrative divisions, Meleuz serves as the administrative center of Meleuzovsky District, even though it is not a part of it. As an administrative division, it is incorporated separately as the town of republic significance of Meleuz—an administrative unit with the status equal to that of the districts. As a municipal division, the town of republic significance of Meleuz is incorporated within Meleuzovsky Municipal District as Meleuz Urban Settlement.

== Climate ==
The climate of Meleuz is continental with relatively cold winters and hot summers. The average annual temperature is 4.6 °C (40.3 °F).
