= Meleuzovsky District =

Meleuzovsky District Мелеузовский район (Russian)
- District

Other transcription(s)
  - Bashkir: Мәләүез районы
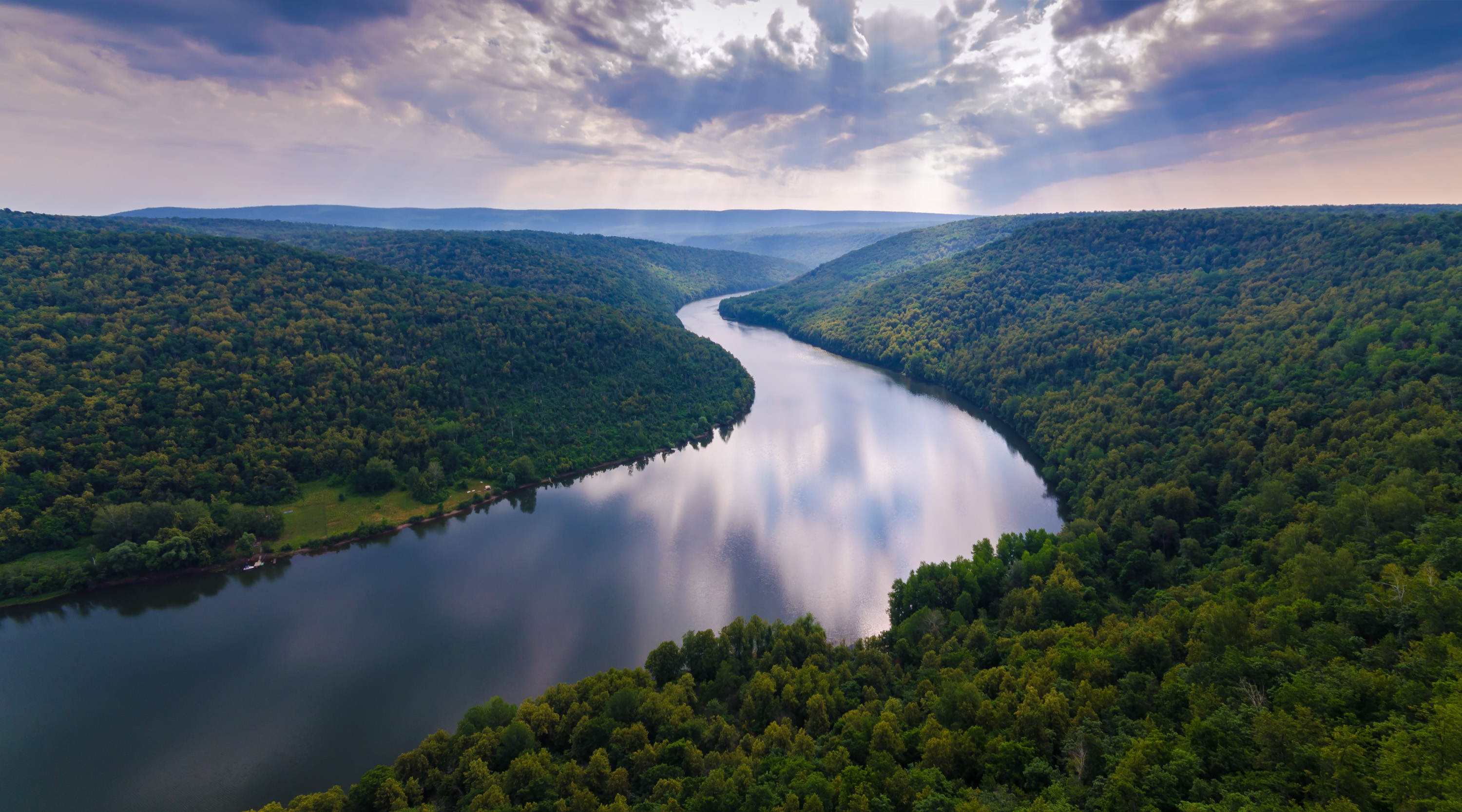
- The Nugush River in Meleuzovsky District

- Flag Coat of arms
- Location of Meleuzovsky District in the Republic of Bashkortostan
- Coordinates: 52°57′N 55°56′E
- Country: Russia
- Federal subject: Republic of Bashkortostan
- Established: August 20, 1930
- Administrative center: Meleuz

Area
  - Total: 3,234 km^{2} (1,249 sq mi)

Population (2010 Census)
  - Total: 27,159
  - Estimate (2018): 83,202 (+206.4%)
  - Density: 8.398/km^{2} (21.75/sq mi)
  - Urban: 0%
  - Rural: 100%

Administrative structure
  - Administrative divisions: 16 Selsoviets
  - Inhabited localities: 94 rural localities

Municipal structure
  - Municipally incorporated as: Meleuzovsky Municipal District
  - Municipal divisions: 1 urban settlements, 16 rural settlements
- Time zone: UTC+5 (MSK+2)
- OKTMO ID: 80641000
- Website: admmeleuz.ru

Population of Meleuzovsky District
- 2010 Census: 27,159
- 2002 Census: 26,723
- 1989 Census: 26,696
- 1979 Census: 30,350

Meleuzovsky District (Russian: Мелеу́зовский райо́н; Bashkir: Мәләүез районы, Mäläwez rayonı) is an administrative and municipal district (raion), one of the fifty-four in the Republic of Bashkortostan, Russia. It is located in the southwest of the republic and borders with Sterlitamaksky and Ishimbaysky Districts in the north, Burzyansky District in the east, Kugarchinsky and Kuyurgazinsky Districts in the south, Fyodorovsky District in the west, and with Sterlibashevsky District in the northwest. The area of the district is 3,234 square kilometers (1,249 sq mi). Its administrative center is the town of Meleuz (which is not administratively a part of the district). As of the 2010 Census, the total population of the district was 27,159.

== History ==
The district was established on August 20, 1930. On February 20, 1932, when Verkhotorsky District was abolished, a part of its territory was appended to Meleuzovsky District. On January 31, 1935, a part of the district was split between newly formed Fyodorovsky, Kuyurgazinsky, and Yumaguzinsky Districts. Another part was merged into Voskresensky District on March 20, 1937. The district was enlarged on February 1, 1963, when it was merged with Kugarchinsky and Yumaguzinsky Districts and transformed into Meleuzovsky Rural District. It was restored on January 14, 1965 and its external borders have not changed ever since.

== Administrative and municipal status ==
Within the framework of administrative divisions, Meleuzovsky District is one of the fifty-four in the Republic of Bashkortostan. It is divided into sixteen selsoviets, comprising ninety-four rural localities. The town of Meleuz serves as its administrative center, despite being incorporated separately as a town of republic significance—an administrative unit with the status equal to that of the districts.

As a municipal division, the district is incorporated as Meleuzovsky Municipal District, with the town of republic significance of Meleuz being incorporated within it as Meleuz Urban Settlement. Its sixteen selsoviets are incorporated as sixteen rural settlements within the municipal district. The town of Meleuz serves as the administrative center of the municipal district as well.
