= Mrakovo, Kugarchinsky District, Republic of Bashkortostan =

Mrakovo Мраково
- Selo

Other transcription(s)
  - Bashkir: Мораҡ
- Interactive map of Mrakovo
- Location of Mrakovo Mrakovo (Bashkortostan)
- Coordinates: 52°42′50″N 56°37′37″E
- Country: Russia
- Federal subject: Bashkortostan
- Administrative district: Kugarchinsky District
- SelsovietSelsoviet: Mrakovsky

Population (2010 Census)
  - Total: 8,690

Administrative status
  - Capital of: Kugarchinsky District, Mrakovsky Selsoviet

Municipal status
  - Municipal district: Kugarchinsky Municipal District
  - Rural settlement: Mrakovsky Selsoviet Rural Settlement
  - Capital of: Kugarchinsky Municipal District, Mrakovsky Selsoviet Rural Settlement
- Time zone: UTC+5 (MSK+2)
- Postal code: 453330
- OKTMO ID: 80638450101

Mrakovo (Russian: Мраково, Bashkir: Мораҡ, Moraq) is a rural locality (a selo) and the administrative center of Kugarchinsky District in the Republic of Bashkortostan, Russia, located on the Bolshoy Ik River. Population: 8,690 (2010 census); 8,378 (2002 census); 7,159 (1989 Soviet census).
