= Kugarchinsky District =

Kugarchinsky District Кугарчинский район (Russian)
- District

Other transcription(s)
  - Bashkir: Күгәрсен районы
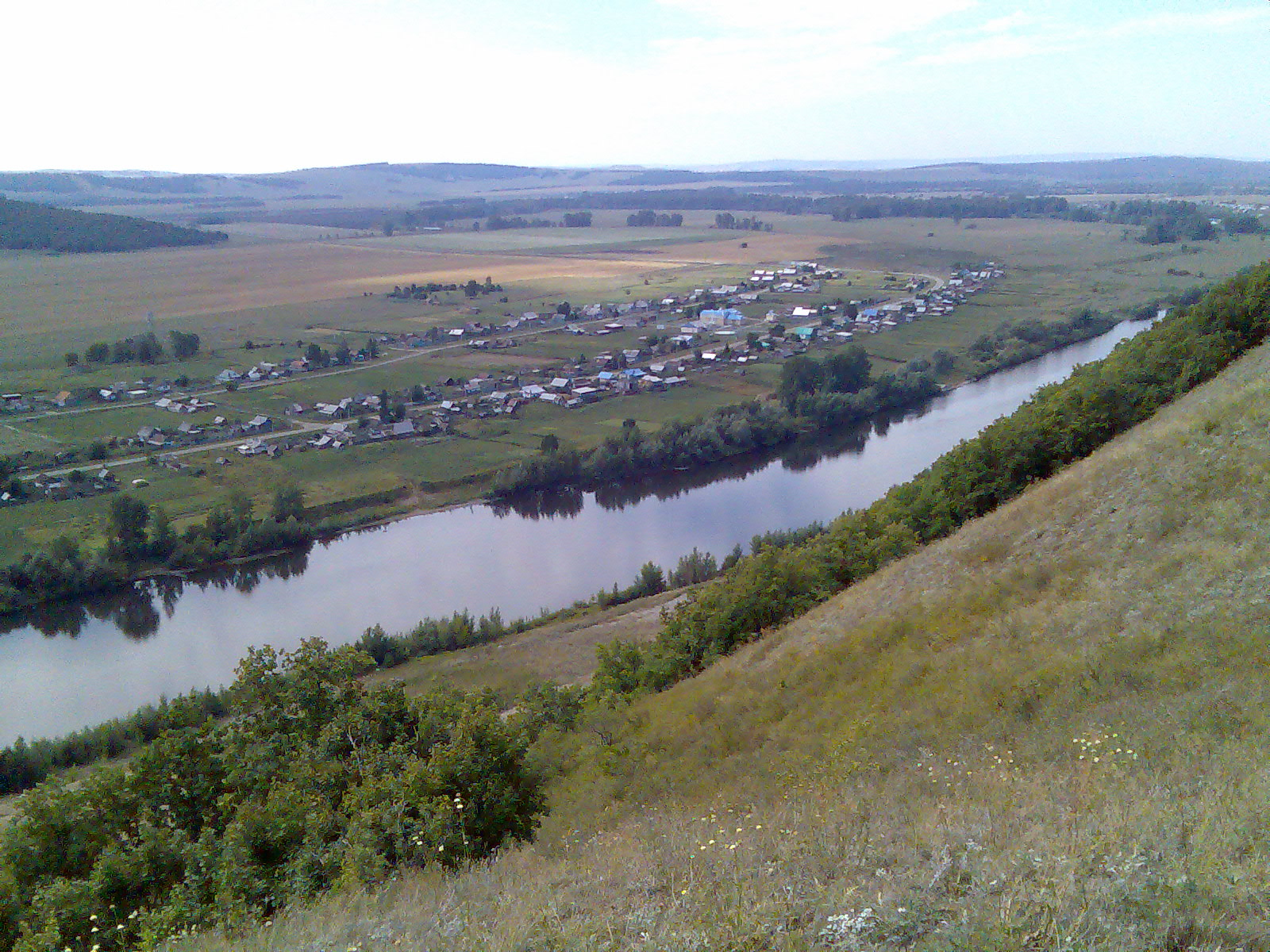
- The village of Verkhnebikkuzino in Kugarchinsky District

- Flag Coat of arms
- Location of Kugarchinsky District in the Republic of Bashkortostan
- Coordinates: 52°43′N 56°38′E
- Country: Russia
- Federal subject: Republic of Bashkortostan
- Established: August 20, 1930
- Administrative center: Mrakovo

Area
  - Total: 3,400 km^{2} (1,300 sq mi)

Population (2010 Census)
  - Total: 31,444
  - Estimate (2018): 28,277 (−10.1%)
  - Density: 9.2/km^{2} (24/sq mi)
  - Urban: 0%
  - Rural: 100%

Administrative structure
  - Administrative divisions: 20 Selsoviets
  - Inhabited localities: 113 rural localities

Municipal structure
  - Municipally incorporated as: Kugarchinsky Municipal District
  - Municipal divisions: 0 urban settlements, 20 rural settlements
- Time zone: UTC+5 (MSK+2)
- OKTMO ID: 80638000
- Website: https://admkugarchi.bashkortostan.ru

Population of Kugarchinsky District
- 2010 Census: 31,444
- 2002 Census: 34,203
- 1989 Census: 31,638
- 1979 Census: 34,312

Kugarchinsky District (Russian: Кугарчи́нский райо́н; Bashkir: Күгәрсен районы, romanized: Kügärsen rayonı) is an administrative and municipal district (raion), one of the fifty-four in the Republic of Bashkortostan, Russia. It is located in the southwest of the republic and borders Meleuzovsky District in the north, Burzyansky District in the northeast, Zilairsky District in the east, Zianchurinsky District in the south, Orenburg Oblast in the southwest, and Kuyurgazinsky District in the west. The area of the district is 3,371 square kilometers (1,302 sq mi). Its administrative center is the rural locality (a selo) of Mrakovo. As of the 2010 Census, the total population of the district was 31,444, with the population of Mrakovo accounting for 27.6% of that number.

== History ==
The district was established on August 20, 1930.

== Administrative and municipal status ==
Within the framework of administrative divisions, Kugarchinsky District is one of the fifty-four in the Republic of Bashkortostan. The district is divided into 20 selsoviets, comprising 113 rural localities. As a municipal division, the district is incorporated as Kugarchinsky Municipal District. Its twenty selsoviets are incorporated as twenty rural settlements within the municipal district. The selo of Mrakovo serves as the administrative center of both the administrative and municipal district.

== Notable people ==
- Murtaza Rakhimov (b. 1934), first President of the Republic of Bashkortostan
