= Antonovka (rural locality) =

Antonovka (Russian: Антоновка) is the name of several rural localities in Russia.

Modern localities

- Antonovka, Arkharinsky District, Amur Oblast, a selo in Antonovsky Rural Settlement of Arkharinsky District of Amur Oblast
- Antonovka, Mazanovsky District, Amur Oblast, a selo in Krasnoyarovsky Rural Settlement of Mazanovsky District of Amur Oblast
- Antonovka, Zavitinsky District, Amur Oblast, a selo in Antonovsky Rural Settlement of Zavitinsky District of Amur Oblast
- Antonovka, Bizhbulyaksky District, Republic of Bashkortostan, a village in Yelbulaktamaksky Selsoviet of Bizhbulyaksky District of the Republic of Bashkortostan
- Antonovka, Gafuriysky District, Republic of Bashkortostan, a selo in Beloozersky Selsoviet of Gafuriysky District of the Republic of Bashkortostan
- Antonovka, Karmaskalinsky District, Republic of Bashkortostan, a village in Yefremkinsky Selsoviet of Karmaskalinsky District of the Republic of Bashkortostan
- Antonovka, Meleuzovsky District, Republic of Bashkortostan, a village in Shevchenkovsky Selsoviet of Meleuzovsky District of the Republic of Bashkortostan
- Antonovka, Belgorod Oblast, a selo in Grayvoronsky District of Belgorod Oblast
- Antonovka, Bryansky District, Bryansk Oblast, a village in Suponevsky Rural Administrative Okrug of Bryansky District of Bryansk Oblast
- Antonovka, Gordeyevsky District, Bryansk Oblast, a village in Unoshevsky Rural Administrative Okrug of Gordeyevsky District of Bryansk Oblast
- Antonovka, Chuvash Republic, a vyselok in Chuvashsko-Sorminskoye Rural Settlement of Alikovsky District of the Chuvash Republic
- Antonovka, Guryevsky District, Kaliningrad Oblast, a settlement in Dobrinsky Rural Okrug of Guryevsky District of Kaliningrad Oblast
- Antonovka, Ozyorsky District, Kaliningrad Oblast, a settlement in Krasnoyarsky Rural Okrug of Ozyorsky District of Kaliningrad Oblast
- Antonovka, Kaluga Oblast, a village in Tarussky District of Kaluga Oblast
- Antonovka, Prokopyevsky District, Kemerovo Oblast, a village in Kuzbasskaya Rural Territory of Prokopyevsky District of Kemerovo Oblast
- Antonovka, Yaysky District, Kemerovo Oblast, a settlement in Sudzhenskaya Rural Territory of Yaysky District of Kemerovo Oblast
- Antonovka, Leningrad Oblast, a village in Voloshovskoye Settlement Municipal Formation of Luzhsky District of Leningrad Oblast
- Antonovka, Republic of Mordovia, a village in Povodimovsky Selsoviet of Dubyonsky District of the Republic of Mordovia
- Antonovka, Moscow Oblast, a village in Novopetrovskoye Rural Settlement of Istrinsky District of Moscow Oblast
- Antonovka, Nizhny Novgorod Oblast, a village in Kriushinsky Selsoviet of Voznesensky District of Nizhny Novgorod Oblast
- Antonovka, Novosibirsk Oblast, a village in Kochenyovsky District of Novosibirsk Oblast
- Antonovka, Omsk Oblast, a selo in Antonovsky Rural Okrug of Nizhneomsky District of Omsk Oblast
- Antonovka, Oryol Oblast, a village in Zhernovetsky Selsoviet of Trosnyansky District of Oryol Oblast
- Antonovka, Chuguyevsky District, Primorsky Krai, a selo in Chuguyevsky District of Primorsky Krai
- Antonovka, Kirovsky District, Primorsky Krai, a selo in Kirovsky District of Primorsky Krai
- Antonovka, Millerovsky District, Rostov Oblast, a khutor in Krivorozhskoye Rural Settlement of Millerovsky District of Rostov Oblast
- Antonovka, Milyutinsky District, Rostov Oblast, a khutor in Nikolo-Berezovskoye Rural Settlement of Milyutinsky District of Rostov Oblast
- Antonovka, Sakha Republic, a selo in Oktyabrsky Rural Okrug of Nyurbinsky District of the Sakha Republic
- Antonovka, Alexeyevsky District, Samara Oblast, a selo in Alexeyevsky District of Samara Oblast
- Antonovka, Pokhvistnevsky District, Samara Oblast, a settlement in Pokhvistnevsky District of Samara Oblast
- Antonovka, Sergiyevsky District, Samara Oblast, a settlement in Sergiyevsky District of Samara Oblast
- Antonovka, Dergachyovsky District, Saratov Oblast, a selo in Dergachyovsky District of Saratov Oblast
- Antonovka, Yershovsky District, Saratov Oblast, a selo in Yershovsky District of Saratov Oblast
- Antonovka, Taborinsky District, Sverdlovsk Oblast, a village in Taborinsky District of Sverdlovsk Oblast
- Antonovka, Turinsky District, Sverdlovsk Oblast, a village in Turinsky District of Sverdlovsk Oblast
- Antonovka, Tambov Oblast, a settlement in Iskrovsky Selsoviet of Zherdevsky District of Tambov Oblast
- Antonovka, Kamsko-Ustyinsky District, Republic of Tatarstan, a selo in Kamsko-Ustyinsky District, the Republic of Tatarstan
- Antonovka, Spassky District, Republic of Tatarstan, a selo in Spassky District, the Republic of Tatarstan
- Antonovka, Tula Oblast, a village in Butikovsky Rural Okrug of Zaoksky District of Tula Oblast

Historical localities

- Antonovka, Arkhangelsk Governorate, a colony included in Alexandrovskaya Volost of Alexandrovsky Uyezd of Arkhangelsk Governorate of the Russian SFSR upon its establishment in 1920
