= Innokentyevka =

Innokentyevka (Russian: Иннокентьевка) is the name of several rural localities in Russia:

- Innokentyevka, Arkharinsky District, Amur Oblast, a selo in Innokentyevsky Selsoviet of Arkharinsky District
- Innokentyevka, Zavitinsky District, Amur Oblast, a selo in Innokentyevsky Selsoviet of Zavitinsky District
