= Aeroflot Flight 811 =

1981 mid-air collision

Accident
- Date: 24 August 1981
- Summary: Mid-air collision
- Site: 70 km (43.8 mls) E of Zavitinsk, Russian SFSR, Soviet Union (now Russia); 50°01′10″N 130°28′00″E
- Total fatalities: 37
- Total injuries: 1
- Total survivors: 1

First aircraft
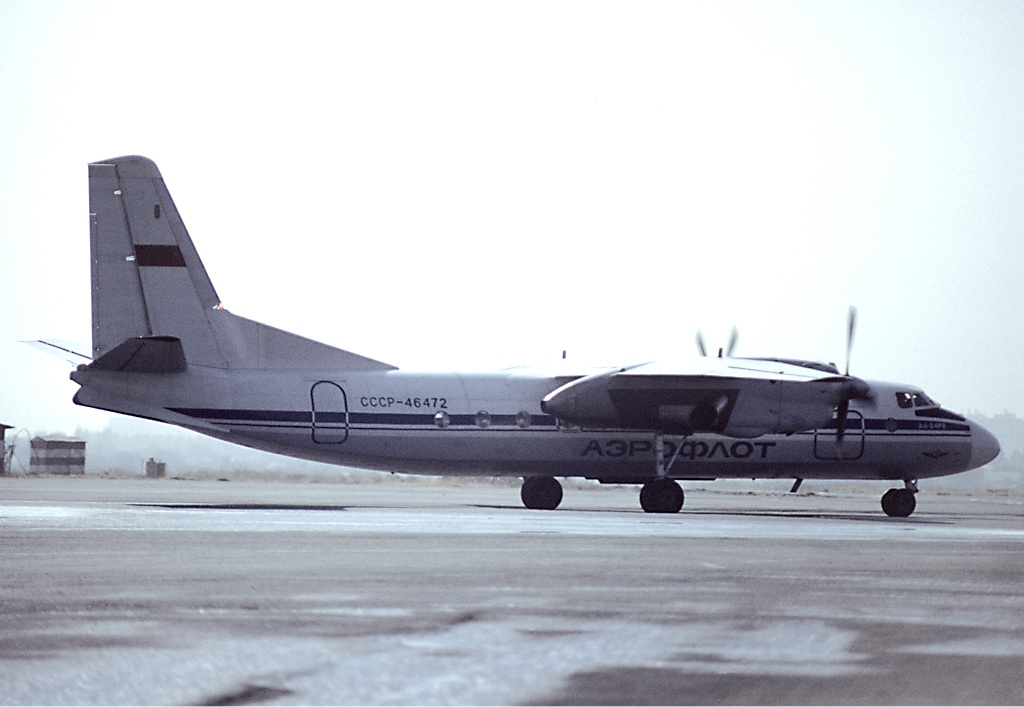
- An Aeroflot An-24RV similar to the accident aircraft, this would later crash as the An-24 crash in Navoiy.
- Type: Antonov An-24RV
- Operator: Aeroflot
- Registration: CCCP-46653
- Flight origin: Yuzhno-Sakhalinsk Airport (UUS)
- Stopover: Komsomolsk-on-Amur Airport (KXK)
- Destination: Blagoveshchensk Airport (BQS/UHBB)
- Passengers: 27
- Crew: 5
- Fatalities: 31
- Injuries: 1
- Survivors: 1

Second aircraft
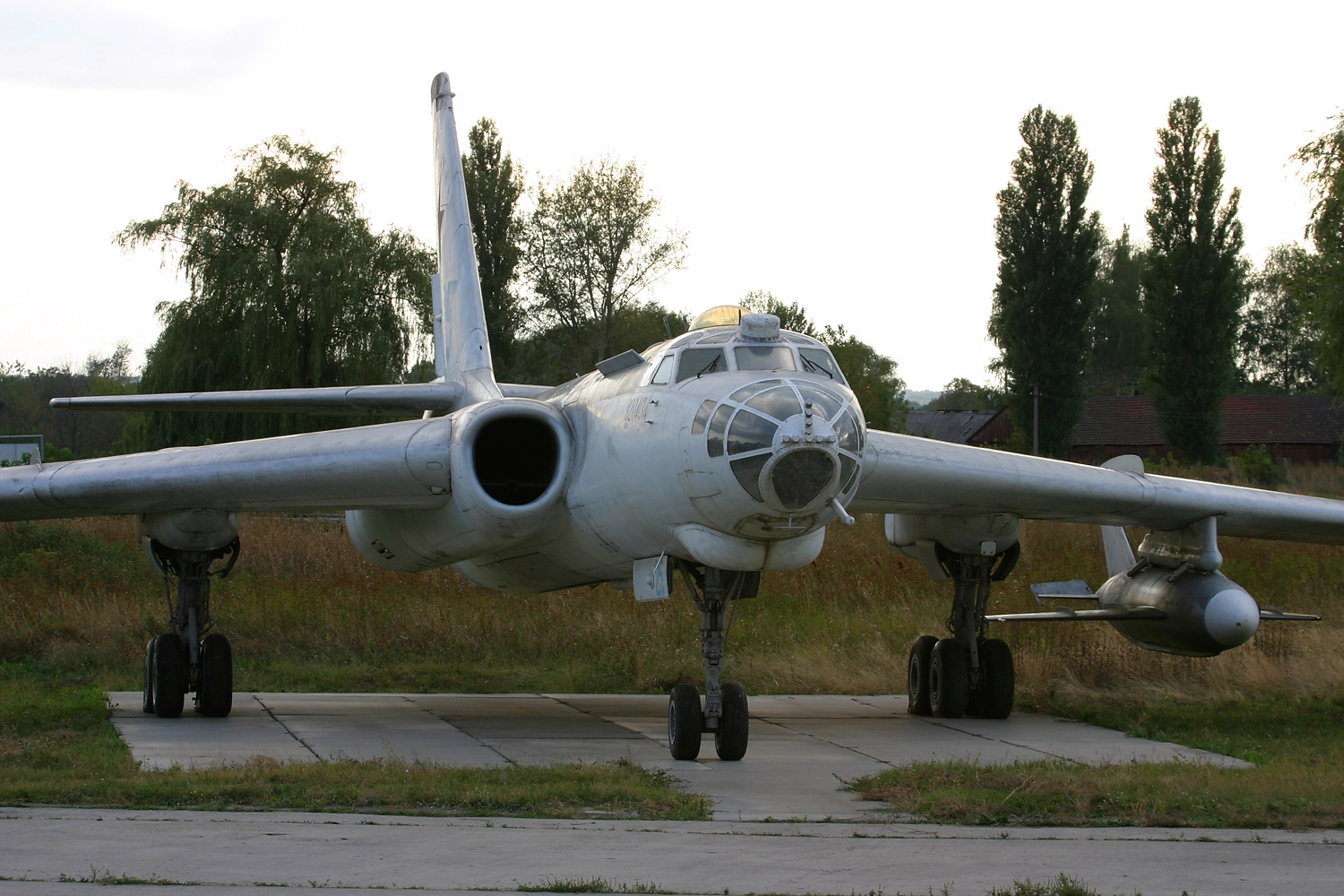
- A Tu-16K similar to the accident aircraft
- Type: Tupolev Tu-16K
- Operator: Soviet Air Forces
- Registration: 07514 (call sign)
- Flight origin: Zavitinsk air base
- Destination: Zavitinsk air base
- Crew: 6
- Fatalities: 6
- Survivors: 0

Aeroflot Flight 811 was a scheduled Soviet domestic passenger flight from Komsomolsk-on-Amur to Blagoveshchensk that collided mid-air on 24 August 1981 with a Tupolev Tu-16K strategic bomber over Zavitinsky District in Amur Oblast, Russian SFSR, Soviet Union (now Russia). The collision between Aeroflot's Antonov An-24RV and the Tupolev Tu-16K occurred at an altitude of 5,220 metres (17,130 ft), killing 37 people on both aircraft. The sole survivor, 20-year-old passenger Larisa Savitskaya, who had been aboard Flight 811, was rescued on the third day after the accident.

== Background and collision ==
The Antonov An-24RV departed from Komsomolsk-on-Amur at 14:56 local time, after a four-hour delay due to weather conditions. The crew consisted of first pilot Alexander Mirgorodsky, co-pilot Valery Shevelev, navigating officer Fedosy Kryzhanovsky, flight engineer Nikolai Dimitriyev and flight attendant Galina Borisova. Among the passengers was one child. Larisa Savitskaya and her husband Vladimir were returning from their honeymoon.

The flight dispatcher was informed that military aircraft would traverse the local airspace at altitudes of 4,200 to 4,500 metres (13,800 to 14,800 ft). On the same day, at 16:00 and 16:01 local time, two Tupolev Tu-16Ks left Zavitinsk air base for weather reconnaissance. At 16:21, one of them (serial number 6203106) collided with the Aeroflot An-24, 70 kilometres (43 mi) east of the air base. The collision occurred in good lighting conditions, with visibility of over 10 kilometres (6.2 mi). Savitskaya was sound asleep at that moment. The Tu-16K tore off the An-24's roof and severed both wings. The temperature inside An-24's cabin dropped from 25 to −30 °C (77 to −22 °F). Both aircraft disintegrated and fell on the taiga. The fragments of the An-24 were scattered in a south-western direction, 1,020 metres (3,350 ft) from the collision point, over an area of 2,500 by 900 metres (8,200 by 3,000 ft). The Tu-16K exploded after hitting the ground, and its fragments were scattered approximately 2,000 metres (6,600 ft) from the collision point.

Savitskaya was conscious during the fall, which lasted eight minutes. She survived partly because the 4-by-3-metre (13 by 10 ft) aircraft fragment she was in started to glide and landed on a soft, swampy glade. She also pushed against the seat with her hands and feet, "perhaps hoping to absorb the blow" in her own words. The impact with the ground, however, knocked her temporarily unconscious. She sustained a concussion, a broken arm and rib and some spinal injuries.

== Investigation ==
The investigation concluded that the flight operations director at Zavitinsk air base did not use radar assistance to track the Tupolevs, which became the direct cause of the accident. Additionally, there was a poor coordination between the local civilian and military air traffic control due to flawed air traffic regulations. Military prosecutors placed the responsibility for the accident on the pilots of both aircraft.

== Aftermath ==
The first reports about the accident in the Soviet press were censored, claiming Savitskaya had crashed in a homemade glider. She was warned by the KGB not to reveal what actually occurred to the public; she spoke openly about the accident for the first time on 11 January 2001 in Moscow. Savitskaya was paid 75 Soviet rubles ($20) compensation by Aeroflot.

== Portrayal in films ==
The One (Russian: Одна, romanized: Odna, lit. 'Alone') is a 2022 Russian disaster-survival adventure film written, co-produced and directed by Dmitry Suvorov. The film tells the story of Savitskaya's life, the catastrophe and her rescue. Savitskaya, who attended the premiere, is portrayed by Russian actress Nadezhda Kaleganova.

== See also ==
- List of aviation accidents and incidents with a sole survivor
- Vesna Vulović - Sole Survivor of JAT Flight 367
