= Staroaktashevo =

Staroaktashevo Староакташево
- Village
- Location within Bashkortostan Location within Russia
- Coordinates: 54°27′N 56°26′E
- Country: Russia
- Region: Bashkortostan
- District: Karmaskalinsky District
- Time zone: UTC+5:00

Staroaktashevo (Russian: Староакташево; Bashkir: Иҫке Аҡташ, İśke Aqtaş) is a rural locality (a village) in Sakhayevsky Selsoviet, Karmaskalinsky District, Bashkortostan, Russia. The population was 414 as of 2010. There are 11 streets.

== Geography ==
Staroaktashevo is located 23 km northeast of Karmaskaly (the district's administrative centre) by road. Staroshareyevo is the nearest rural locality.
