= Novokazanka, Karmaskalinsky District, Republic of Bashkortostan =

Novokazanka Новоказанка
- Village
- Location within Bashkortostan Location within Russia
- Coordinates: 54°12′N 56°14′E
- Country: Russia
- Region: Bashkortostan
- District: Karmaskalinsky District
- Time zone: UTC+5:00

Novokazanka (Russian: Новоказанка; Bashkir: Яңы Ҡаҙан, Yañı Qaźan) is a rural locality (a village) in Yefremkinsky Selsoviet, Karmaskalinsky District, Bashkortostan, Russia. The population was 19 as of 2010. There is 1 street.

== Geography ==
Novokazanka is located 26 km south of Karmaskaly (the district's administrative centre) by road. Georgiyevka is the nearest rural locality.
