= Bochkaryovka, Karmaskalinsky District, Republic of Bashkortostan =

Bochkaryovka Бочкарёвка
- Village
- Location within Bashkortostan Location within Russia
- Coordinates: 54°14′N 56°14′E
- Country: Russia
- Region: Bashkortostan
- District: Karmaskalinsky District
- Time zone: UTC+5:00

Bochkaryovka (Russian: Бочкарёвка) is a rural locality (a village) in Yefremkinsky Selsoviet, Karmaskalinsky District, Bashkortostan, Russia. The population was 31 as of 2010. There is 1 street.

== Geography ==
Bochkaryovka is located 22 km southeast of Karmaskaly (the district's administrative centre) by road. Matrosovka is the nearest rural locality.
