= Staroalexeyevka =

Staroalexeyevka Староалексеевка
- Village
- Location within Bashkortostan Location within Russia
- Coordinates: 54°16′N 55°43′E
- Country: Russia
- Region: Bashkortostan
- District: Karmaskalinsky District
- Time zone: UTC+5:00

Staroalexeyevka (Russian: Староалексеевка) is a rural locality (a village) in Adzitarovsky Selsoviet, Karmaskalinsky District, Bashkortostan, Russia. The population was 25 as of 2010. There is 1 street.

== Geography ==
Staroalexeyevka is located 35 km southwest of Karmaskaly (the district's administrative centre) by road. Yakty-Yalan is the nearest rural locality.
