= Mursyakovo =

Mursyakovo Мурсяково
- Village
- Location within Bashkortostan Location within Russia
- Coordinates: 54°16′N 56°10′E
- Country: Russia
- Region: Bashkortostan
- District: Karmaskalinsky District
- Time zone: UTC+5:00

Mursyakovo (Russian: Мурсяково; Bashkir: Мөрсәк, Mörsäk) is a rural locality (a village) in Yefremkinsky Selsoviet, Karmaskalinsky District, Bashkortostan, Russia. The population was 77 as of 2010. There are 2 streets.

== Geography ==
Mursyakovo is located 22 km south of Karmaskaly (the district's administrative centre) by road. Antonovka is the nearest rural locality.
