= Sarsaz, Karmaskalinsky District, Republic of Bashkortostan =

Sarsaz Сарсаз
- Village
- Location within Bashkortostan Location within Russia
- Coordinates: 54°25′N 55°57′E
- Country: Russia
- Region: Bashkortostan
- District: Karmaskalinsky District
- Time zone: UTC+5:00

Sarsaz (Russian: Сарсаз; Bashkir: Һарыһаҙ, Harıhaź) is a rural locality (a village) in Podlubovsky Selsoviet, Karmaskalinsky District, Bashkortostan, Russia. The population was 90 as of 2010. There are two streets.

== Geography ==
Sarsaz is located 23 km northwest of Karmaskaly (the district's administrative centre) by road. Suuk-Chishma is the nearest rural locality.
