= Kulushevo =

Kulushevo Кулушево
- Village
- Location within Bashkortostan Location within Russia
- Coordinates: 54°29′N 56°11′E
- Country: Russia
- Region: Bashkortostan
- District: Karmaskalinsky District
- Time zone: UTC+5:00

Kulushevo (Russian: Кулушево; Bashkir: Ҡолош, Qoloş) is a rural locality (a village) in Savaleyevsky Selsoviet, Karmaskalinsky District, Bashkortostan, Russia. The population was 255 as of 2010. There are 11 streets.

== Geography ==
Kulushevo is located 27 km north of Karmaskaly (the district's administrative centre) by road. Kabakovo is the nearest rural locality.
