= Kalmovka =

Kalmovka Кальмовка
- Village
- Location within Bashkortostan Location within Russia
- Coordinates: 54°26′N 56°13′E
- Country: Russia
- Region: Bashkortostan
- District: Karmaskalinsky District
- Time zone: UTC+5:00

Kalmovka (Russian: Кальмовка) is a rural locality (a village) in Nikolayevsky Selsoviet, Karmaskalinsky District, Bashkortostan, Russia. The population was 30 as of 2010. There is 1 street.

== Geography ==
Kalmovka is located 11 km northeast of Karmaskaly (the district's administrative centre) by road. Savaleyevo is the nearest rural locality.
