= Sulu-Kuak =

Sulu-Kuak Сулу-Куак
- Village
- Location within Bashkortostan Location within Russia
- Coordinates: 54°18′N 55°44′E
- Country: Russia
- Region: Bashkortostan
- District: Karmaskalinsky District
- Time zone: UTC+5:00

Sulu-Kuak (Russian: Сулу-Куак; Bashkir: Һыулыҡыуаҡ, Hıwlıqıwaq) is a rural locality (a village) in Adzitarovsky Selsoviet, Karmaskalinsky District, Bashkortostan, Russia. The population was 44 as of 2010. There is 1 street.

== Geography ==
Sulu-Kuak is located 36 km west of Karmaskaly (the district's administrative centre) by road. Yakty-Yalan and Kushkul are the nearest rural localities.
