= Ulukulevo =

Ulukulevo Улукулево
- Village
- Location within Bashkortostan Location within Russia
- Coordinates: 54°25′N 56°19′E
- Country: Russia
- Region: Bashkortostan
- District: Karmaskalinsky District
- Time zone: UTC+5:00

Ulukulevo (Russian: Улукулево; Bashkir: Олокүл, Olokül) is a rural locality (a village) and the administrative centre of Karlamansky Selsoviet, Karmaskalinsky District, Bashkortostan, Russia. The population was 4,546 as of 2010. There are 31 streets.

== Geography ==
Ulukulevo is located 16 km northeast of Karmaskaly (the district's administrative centre) by road. Karlaman is the nearest rural locality.
