= Rakitovka =

Rakitovka Ракитовка
- Village
- Location within Bashkortostan Location within Russia
- Coordinates: 54°26′N 55°54′E
- Country: Russia
- Region: Bashkortostan
- District: Karmaskalinsky District
- Time zone: UTC+5:00

Rakitovka (Russian: Ракитовка) is a rural locality (a village) in Podlubovsky Selsoviet, Karmaskalinsky District, Bashkortostan, Russia. The population was 10 as of 2010. There are 3 streets.

== Geography ==
Rakitovka is located 29 km northwest of Karmaskaly (the district's administrative centre) by road. Suuk-Chishma is the nearest rural locality.
