= Salzigutovo =

Salzigutovo Сальзигутово
- Village
- Location within Bashkortostan Location within Russia
- Coordinates: 54°32′N 56°05′E
- Country: Russia
- Region: Bashkortostan
- District: Karmaskalinsky District
- Time zone: UTC+5:00

Salzigutovo (Russian: Сальзигутово; Bashkir: Салйоғот, Salyoğot) is a rural locality (a village) in Kabakovsky Selsoviet, Karmaskalinsky District, Bashkortostan, Russia. The population was 265 as of 2010. There are 11 streets.

== Geography ==
Salzigutovo is located 33 km north of Karmaskaly (the district's administrative centre) by road. Kabakovo is the nearest rural locality.
