= Preobrazhenovka =

Preobrazhenovka (Russian: Преображеновка) is the name of several rural localities in Russia:

- Preobrazhenovka, Zavitinsky District, Amur Oblast, a selo in Preobrazhenovsky Selsoviet of Zavitinsky District, Amur Oblast
- Preobrazhenovka, Oktyabrsky District, Amur Oblast, a selo in Pereyaslovsky Selsoviet of Oktyabrsky District, Amur Oblast
