= Novoaktashevo =

Novoaktashevo Новоакташево
- Village
- Location within Bashkortostan Location within Russia
- Coordinates: 54°24′N 56°14′E
- Country: Russia
- Region: Bashkortostan
- District: Karmaskalinsky District
- Time zone: UTC+5:00

Novoaktashevo (Russian: Новоакташево; Bashkir: Яңы Аҡташ, Yañı Aqtaş) is a rural locality (a village) in Karlamansky Selsoviet, Karmaskalinsky District, Bashkortostan, Russia. The population was 45 as of 2010. There is 1 street.

== Geography ==
Novoaktashevo is located 9 km northeast of Karmaskaly (the district's administrative centre) by road. Ural is the nearest rural locality.
