= Buzovyazy =

Buzovyazy Бузовьязы
- Selo
- Location within Bashkortostan Location within Russia
- Coordinates: 54°17′N 55°48′E
- Country: Russia
- Region: Bashkortostan
- District: Karmaskalinsky District
- Time zone: UTC+5:00

Buzovyazy (Russian: Бузовьязы; Bashkir: Боҙаяҙ, Boźayaź) is a rural locality (a selo) and the administrative centre of Buzovyazovsky Selsoviet, Karmaskalinsky District, Bashkortostan, Russia. The population was 1,492 as of 2010. There are 12 streets.

== Geography ==
Buzovyazy is located 27 km southwest of Karmaskaly (the district's administrative centre) by road. Buzovyazbash is the nearest rural locality.
