= Verkhnetimkino =

Verkhnetimkino Верхнетимкино
- Village
- Location within Bashkortostan Location within Russia
- Coordinates: 54°29′N 56°01′E
- Country: Russia
- Region: Bashkortostan
- District: Karmaskalinsky District
- Time zone: UTC+5:00

Verkhnetimkino (Russian: Верхнетимкино; Bashkir: Үрге Тимкә, Ürge Timkä) is a rural locality (a village) in Kabakovsky Selsoviet, Karmaskalinsky District, Bashkortostan, Russia. The population was 170 as of 2010. There are 6 streets.

== Geography ==
Verkhnetimkino is located 27 km northwest of Karmaskaly (the district's administrative centre) by road. Sikhonkino is the nearest rural locality.
