= Yelizavetino =

Yelizavetino Елизаветино
- Village
- Location within Bashkortostan Location within Russia
- Coordinates: 54°17′N 55°39′E
- Country: Russia
- Region: Bashkortostan
- District: Karmaskalinsky District
- Time zone: UTC+5:00

Yelizavetino (Russian: Елизаветино) is a rural locality (a village) in Adzitarovsky Selsoviet, Karmaskalinsky District, Bashkortostan, Russia. The population was 7 as of 2010. There is 1 street.

== Geography ==
Yelizavetino is located 45 km southwest of Karmaskaly (the district's administrative centre) by road. Tansaitovo is the nearest rural locality.
