= Nizhnetimkino =

Nizhnetimkino Нижнетимкино
- Village
- Location within Bashkortostan Location within Russia
- Coordinates: 54°31′N 56°01′E
- Country: Russia
- Region: Bashkortostan
- District: Karmaskalinsky District
- Time zone: UTC+5:00

Nizhnetimkino (Russian: Нижнетимкино; Bashkir: Түбәнге Тимкә, Tübänge Timkä) is a rural locality (a village) in Kabakovsky Selsoviet, Karmaskalinsky District, Bashkortostan, Russia. The population was 195 as of 2010. There are 4 streets.

== Geography ==
Nizhnetimkino is located 29 km northwest of Karmaskaly (the district's administrative centre) by road. Sikhonkino is the nearest rural locality.
