= Tubyak-Tazlarovo =

Tubyak-Tazlarovo Тубяк-Тазларово
- Village
- Location within Bashkortostan Location within Russia
- Coordinates: 54°17′N 56°22′E
- Country: Russia
- Region: Bashkortostan
- District: Karmaskalinsky District
- Time zone: UTC+5:00

Tubyak-Tazlarovo (Russian: Тубяк-Тазларово; Bashkir: Төбәк-Таҙлар, Töbäk-Taźlar) is a rural locality (a village) in Novokiyeshkinsky Selsoviet, Karmaskalinsky District, Bashkortostan, Russia. The population was 60 as of 2010. There is 1 street.

== Geography ==
Tubyak-Tazlarovo is located 25 km southeast of Karmaskaly (the district's administrative centre) by road. Tazlarovo is the nearest rural locality.
