= Tausengirovo =

Tausengirovo Таусенгирово
- Village
- Location within Bashkortostan Location within Russia
- Coordinates: 54°20′N 56°04′E
- Country: Russia
- Region: Bashkortostan
- District: Karmaskalinsky District
- Time zone: UTC+5:00

Tausengirovo (Russian: Таусенгирово; Bashkir: Тауһеңер, Tawheñer) is a rural locality (a village) in Shaymuratovsky Selsoviet, Karmaskalinsky District, Bashkortostan, Russia. The population was 72 as of 2010. There are two streets.

== Geography ==
Tausengirovo is located 7 km southwest of Karmaskaly (the district's administrative centre) by road. Karmaskaly is the nearest rural locality.
