= Alaygirovo =

Alaygirovo Алайгирово
- Village
- Location within Bashkortostan Location within Russia
- Coordinates: 54°13′N 56°11′E
- Country: Russia
- Region: Bashkortostan
- District: Karmaskalinsky District
- Time zone: UTC+5:00

Alaygirovo (Russian: Алайгирово; Bashkir: Алайғыр, Alayğır) is a rural locality (a village) in Yefremkinsky Selsoviet, Karmaskalinsky District, Bashkortostan, Russia. The population was 468 as of 2010. There are 5 streets.

== Geography ==
Alaygirovo is located 24 km south of Karmaskaly (the district's administrative centre) by road. Nikiforovka is the nearest rural locality.
