= Yakty-Yalan =

Yakty-Yalan Якты-Ялан
- Village
- Location within Bashkortostan Location within Russia
- Coordinates: 54°17′N 55°44′E
- Country: Russia
- Region: Bashkortostan
- District: Karmaskalinsky District
- Time zone: UTC+5:00

Yakty-Yalan (Russian: Якты-Ялан; Bashkir: Яҡтыялан, Yaqtıyalan) is a rural locality (a village) in Adzitarovsky Selsoviet, Karmaskalinsky District, Bashkortostan, Russia. The population was 438 as of 2010. There are 2 streets.

== Geography ==
Yakty-Yalan is located 32 km southwest of Karmaskaly (the district's administrative centre) by road. Staroalexeyevka is the nearest rural locality.
