= Sakhayevo =

Sakhayevo Сахаево
- Village
- Location within Bashkortostan Location within Russia
- Coordinates: 54°25′N 56°22′E
- Country: Russia
- Region: Bashkortostan
- District: Karmaskalinsky District
- Time zone: UTC+5:00

Sakhayevo (Russian: Сахаево; Bashkir: Сахай, Saxay) is a rural locality (a village) and the administrative centre of Sakhayevsky Selsoviet, Karmaskalinsky District, Bashkortostan, Russia. The population was 1,615 as of 2010. There are 29 streets.

== Geography ==
Sakhayevo is located 17 km northeast of Karmaskaly (the district's administrative centre) by road. Ulukulevo is the nearest rural locality.
