= Savaleyevo =

Savaleyevo Савалеево
- Village
- Location within Bashkortostan Location within Russia
- Coordinates: 54°28′N 56°14′E
- Country: Russia
- Region: Bashkortostan
- District: Karmaskalinsky District
- Time zone: UTC+5:00

Savaleyevo (Russian: Савалеево; Bashkir: Һәүәләй, Häwäläy) is a rural locality (a village) and the administrative centre of Savaleyevsky Selsoviet, Karmaskalinsky District, Bashkortostan, Russia. The population was 1,013 as of 2010. There are 22 streets.

== Geography ==
Savaleyevo is located 21 km northeast of Karmaskaly (the district's administrative centre) by road. Bishaul-Ungarovo is the nearest rural locality.
