= Smolenka, Karmaskalinsky District, Republic of Bashkortostan =

Smolenka Смоленка
- Village
- Location within Bashkortostan Location within Russia
- Coordinates: 54°16′N 56°02′E
- Country: Russia
- Region: Bashkortostan
- District: Karmaskalinsky District
- Time zone: UTC+5:00

Smolenka (Russian: Смоленка) is a rural locality (a village) in Starobabichevsky Selsoviet, Karmaskalinsky District, Bashkortostan, Russia. The population was 8 as of 2010. There is 1 street.

== Geography ==
Smolenka is located 16 km southwest of Karmaskaly (the district's administrative centre) by road. Novy Kuganak is the nearest rural locality.
