= Sikhonkino =

Sikhonkino Сихонкино
- Selo
- Location within Bashkortostan Location within Russia
- Coordinates: 54°30′N 56°00′E
- Country: Russia
- Region: Bashkortostan
- District: Karmaskalinsky District
- Time zone: UTC+5:00

Sikhonkino (Russian: Сихонкино) is a rural locality (a selo) in Kabakovsky Selsoviet, Karmaskalinsky District, Bashkortostan, Russia. The population was 891 as of 2010. There are 7 streets.

== Geography ==
Sikhonkino is located 25 km northwest of Karmaskaly (the district's administrative centre) by road. Verkhnetimkino is the nearest rural locality.
