= Kullyarovo =

Kullyarovo Куллярово
- Village
- Location within Bashkortostan Location within Russia
- Coordinates: 54°17′N 56°15′E
- Country: Russia
- Region: Bashkortostan
- District: Karmaskalinsky District
- Time zone: UTC+5:00

Kullyarovo (Russian: Куллярово; Bashkir: Күлләр, Küllär) is a rural locality (a village) in Yefremkinsky Selsoviet, Karmaskalinsky District, Bashkortostan, Russia. The population was 148 as of 2010. There are 3 streets.

== Geography ==
Kullyarovo is located 13 km southeast of Karmaskaly (the district's administrative centre) by road. Mukayevo is the nearest rural locality.
