= Kachevan =

Kachevan Качеван
- Village
- Location within Bashkortostan Location within Russia
- Coordinates: 54°18′N 56°03′E
- Country: Russia
- Region: Bashkortostan
- District: Karmaskalinsky District
- Time zone: UTC+5:00

Kachevan (Russian: Качеван; Bashkir: Кәсеүән, Käsewän) is a rural locality (a village) in Karmaskalinsky Selsoviet, Karmaskalinsky District, Bashkortostan, Russia. The population was 104 as of 2010. There are 3 streets.

== Geography ==
Kachevan is located 11 km southwest of Karmaskaly (the district's administrative centre) by road. Beryozovka is the nearest rural locality.
