= Malayevo =

Malayevo Малаево
- Village
- Location within Bashkortostan Location within Russia
- Coordinates: 54°15′N 56°25′E
- Country: Russia
- Region: Bashkortostan
- District: Karmaskalinsky District
- Time zone: UTC+5:00

Malayevo (Russian: Малаево; Bashkir: Малай, Malay) is a rural locality (a village) in Kamyshlinsky Selsoviet, Karmaskalinsky District, Bashkortostan, Russia. The population was 265 as of 2010. There are 4 streets.

== Geography ==
Malayevo is located 30 km southeast of Karmaskaly (the district's administrative centre) by road. Karakul is the nearest rural locality.
