= Bishaul-Ungarovo =

Bishaul-Ungarovo Бишаул-Унгарово
- Village
- Location within Bashkortostan Location within Russia
- Coordinates: 54°27′N 56°16′E
- Country: Russia
- Region: Bashkortostan
- District: Karmaskalinsky District
- Time zone: UTC+5:00

Bishaul-Ungarovo (Russian: Бишаул-Унгарово; Bashkir: Бишауыл-Уңғар, Bişawıl-Uñğar) is a rural locality (a village) in Savaleyevsky Selsoviet, Karmaskalinsky District, Bashkortostan, Russia. The population was 573 as of 2010. There are 11 streets.

== Geography ==
Bishaul-Ungarovo is located 19 km northeast of Karmaskaly (the district's administrative centre) by road. Savaleyevo is the nearest rural locality.
