= Sharipkulovo =

Sharipkulovo Шарипкулово
- Village
- Location within Bashkortostan Location within Russia
- Coordinates: 54°21′N 56°16′E
- Country: Russia
- Region: Bashkortostan
- District: Karmaskalinsky District
- Time zone: UTC+5:00

Sharipkulovo (Russian: Шарипкулово; Bashkir: Шәрипҡол, Şäripqol) is a rural locality (a village) in Karlamansky Selsoviet, Karmaskalinsky District, Bashkortostan, Russia. The population was 403 as of 2010. There are 7 streets.

== Geography ==
Sharipkulovo is located 16 km east of Karmaskaly (the district's administrative centre) by road. Ivanovka is the nearest rural locality.
