= Nizhny Tyukun =

Nizhny Tyukun Нижний Тюкунь
- Village
- Location within Bashkortostan Location within Russia
- Coordinates: 54°12′N 56°23′E
- Country: Russia
- Region: Bashkortostan
- District: Karmaskalinsky District
- Time zone: UTC+5:00

Nizhny Tyukun (Russian: Нижний Тюкунь; Bashkir: Түбәнге Төкөн, Tübänge Tökön) is a rural locality (a village) in Kamyshlinsky Selsoviet, Karmaskalinsky District, Bashkortostan, Russia. The population was 297 as of 2010. There are 4 streets.

== Geography ==
Nizhny Tyukun is located 27 km southeast of Karmaskaly (the district's administrative centre) by road. Verkhny Tyukun is the nearest rural locality.
