= Novyye Kiyeshki =

Novyye Kiyeshki Новые Киешки
- Selo
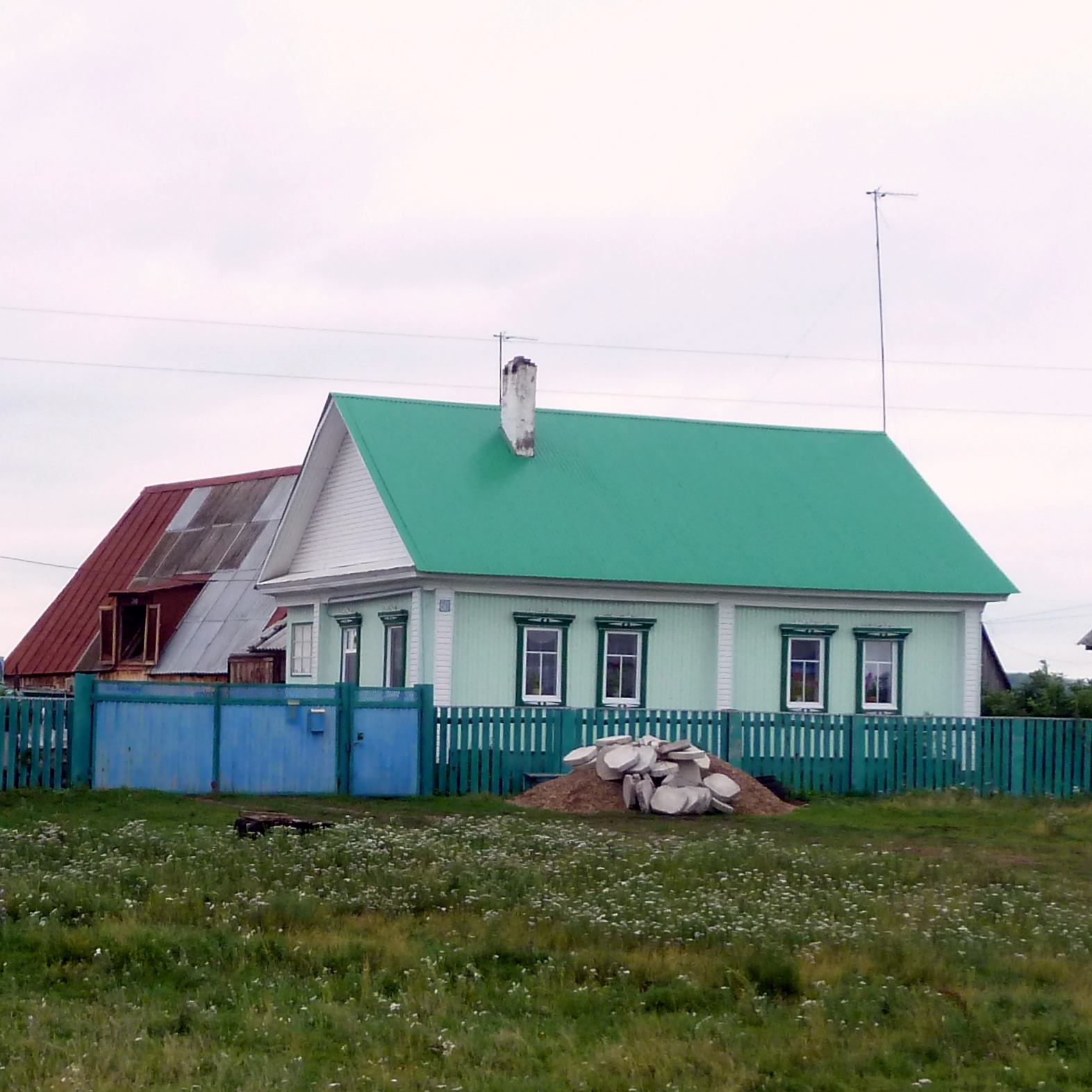

- Location within Bashkortostan Location within Russia
- Coordinates: 54°20′N 56°25′E
- Country: Russia
- Region: Bashkortostan
- District: Karmaskalinsky District
- Time zone: UTC+5:00

Novyye Kiyeshki (Russian: Новые Киешки; Bashkir: Яңы Ҡыйышҡы, Yañı Qıyışqı) is a rural locality (a selo) and the administrative centre of Novokiyeshkinsky Selsoviet, Karmaskalinsky District, Bashkortostan, Russia. The population was 16 as of 2010. There are 18 streets.

== Geography ==
Novyye Kiyeshki is located 29 km east of Karmaskaly (the district's administrative centre) by road. Utyaganovo is the nearest rural locality.
