= Verkhny Tyukun =

Verkhny Tyukun Верхний Тюкунь
- Village
- Location within Bashkortostan Location within Russia
- Coordinates: 54°10′N 56°21′E
- Country: Russia
- Region: Bashkortostan
- District: Karmaskalinsky District
- Time zone: UTC+5:00

Verkhny Tyukun (Russian: Верхний Тюкунь; Bashkir: Үрге Төкөн, Ürge Tökön) is a rural locality (a village) in Kamyshlinsky Selsoviet, Karmaskalinsky District, Bashkortostan, Russia. The population was 240 as of 2010. There are 5 streets.

== Geography ==
Verkhny Tyukun is located 29 km southeast of Karmaskaly (the district's administrative centre) by road. Tyukun is the nearest rural locality.
