= Novoandreyevka, Republic of Bashkortostan =

Novoandreyevka Новоандреевка
- Village
- Location within Bashkortostan Location within Russia
- Coordinates: 54°24′N 55°57′E
- Country: Russia
- Region: Bashkortostan
- District: Karmaskalinsky District
- Time zone: UTC+5:00

Novoandreyevka (Russian: Новоандреевка) is a rural locality (a village) in Shaymuratovsky Selsoviet, Karmaskalinsky District, Bashkortostan, Russia. The population was 121 as of 2010. There are 4 streets.

== Geography ==
Novoandreyevka is located 26 km northwest of Karmaskaly (the district's administrative centre) by road. Grachyovka is the nearest rural locality.
