= Zavitinsk (disambiguation) =

Zavitinsk is a town in Amur Oblast, Russia.

Zavitinsk may also refer to:

- Zavitinsk Urban Settlement, an administrative division and a municipal formation which the town of Zavitinsk and three rural localities in Zavitinsky District of Amur Oblast, Russia are incorporated as
- Zavitinsk (air base), an air base in Amur Oblast, Russia
