= Advokatovka =

Advokatovka Адвокатовка
- Village
- Location within Bashkortostan Location within Russia
- Coordinates: 54°09′N 56°12′E
- Country: Russia
- Region: Bashkortostan
- District: Karmaskalinsky District
- Time zone: UTC+5:00

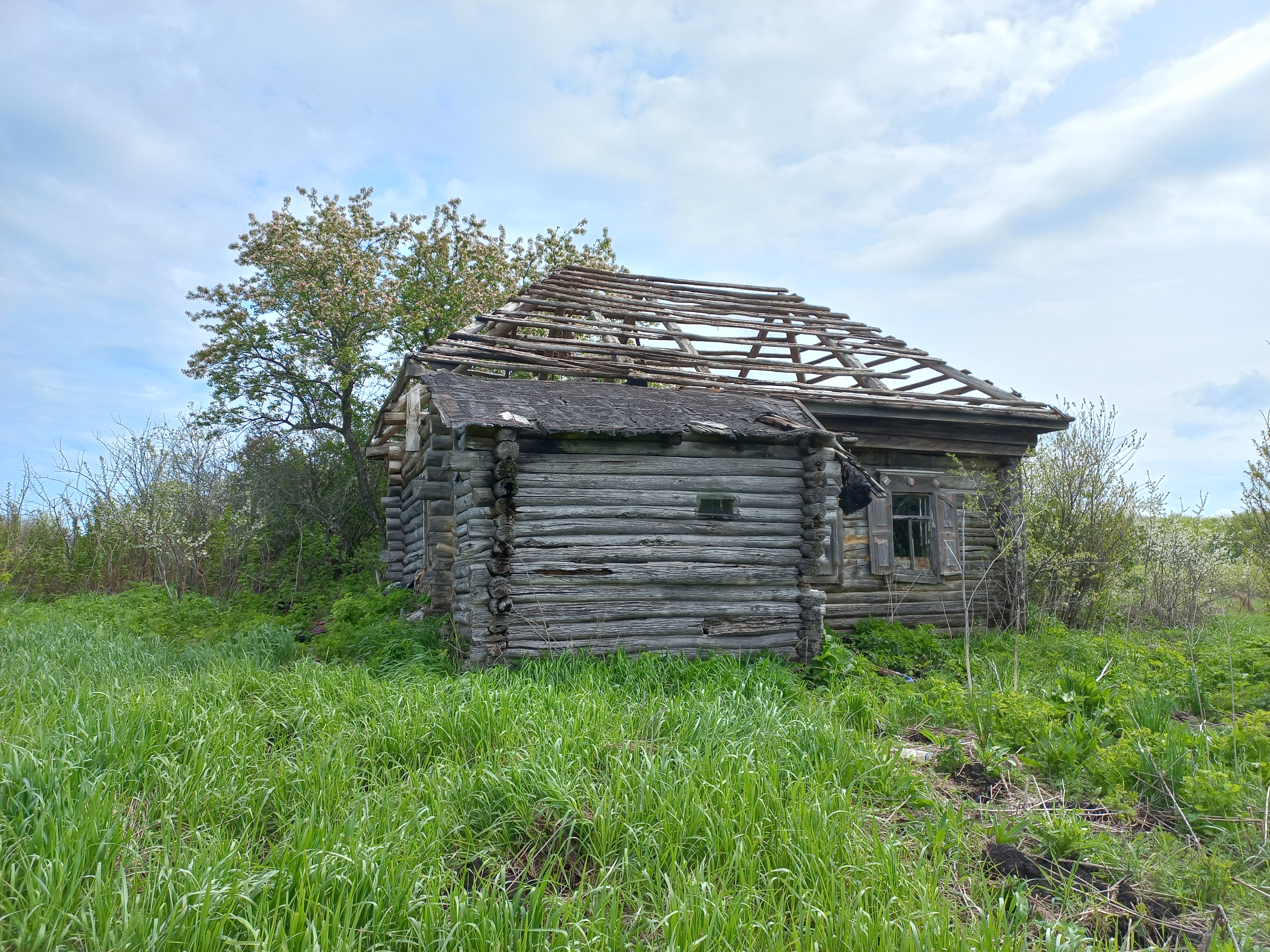
Advokatovka, 2022

Advokatovka (Russian: Адвокатовка) is a rural locality (a village) in Starobabichevsky Selsoviet, Karmaskalinsky District, Bashkortostan, Russia. The population was 4 as of 2010. There is 1 street.

== Geography ==
Advokatovka is located 28 km south of Karmaskaly (the district's administrative centre) by road. Novy Bishaul is the nearest rural locality.
