= Staroyanbekovo =

Staroyanbekovo Староянбеково
- Village
- Location within Bashkortostan Location within Russia
- Coordinates: 54°13′N 55°33′E
- Country: Russia
- Region: Bashkortostan
- District: Karmaskalinsky District
- Time zone: UTC+5:00

Staroyanbekovo (Russian: Староянбеково; Bashkir: Иҫке Йәнбәк, İśke Yänbäk) is a rural locality (a village) in Adzitarovsky Selsoviet, Karmaskalinsky District, Bashkortostan, Russia. The population was 92 as of 2010. There are 2 streets.

== Geography ==
Staroyanbekovo is located 51 km southwest of Karmaskaly (the district's administrative centre) by road. Kamchalytamak is the nearest rural locality.
