= Avangard, Samara Oblast =

Avangard Авангард
- Village
- Location within Samara Oblast Location within Russia
- Coordinates: 52°37′N 51°16′E
- Country: Russia
- Region: Samara Oblast
- District: Alexeyevsky District
- Time zone: UTC+4:00

Avangard (Russian: Авангард) is a rural locality (a settlement) and the administrative center of Avangard Rural Settlement of Alexeyevsky District, Samara Oblast, Russia. The population was 837 as of 2015. There are 11 streets.

== Geography ==
Avangard is located 5 km north of Alexeyevka (the district's administrative centre) by road. Alexeyevka is the nearest rural locality.
