= Karlaman =

Karlaman Карламан
- Village
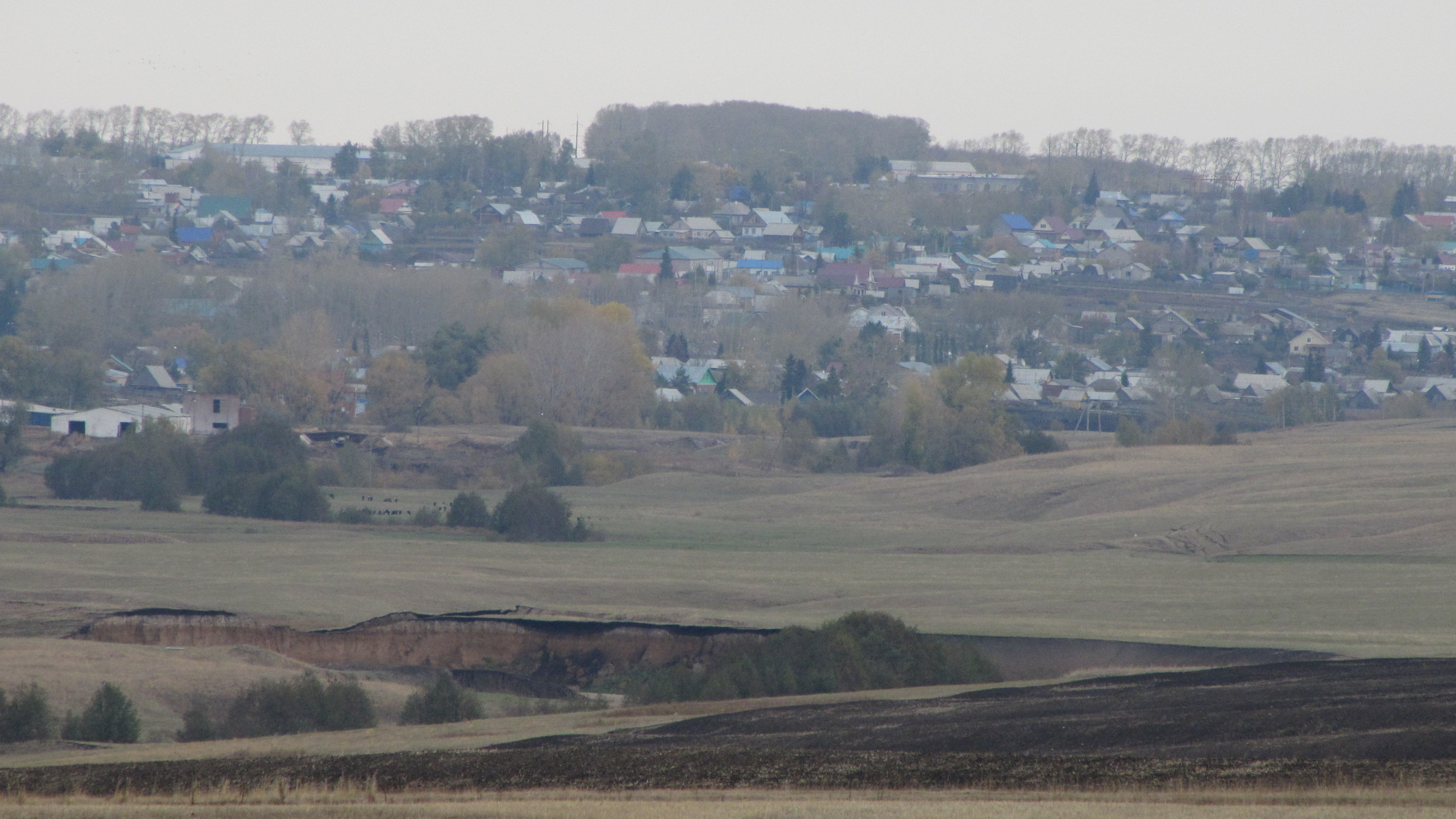

- Location within Bashkortostan Location within Russia
- Coordinates: 54°18′N 56°08′E
- Country: Russia
- Region: Bashkortostan
- District: Karmaskalinsky District
- Time zone: UTC+5:00

Karlaman (Russian: Карламан; Bashkir: Ҡарлыман, Qarlıman) is a rural locality (a village) in Karmaskalinsky Selsoviet, Karmaskalinsky District, Bashkortostan, Russia. The population was 633 as of 2010. There are 8 streets.

== Geography ==
Karlaman is located 6 km southwest of Karmaskaly (the district's administrative centre) by road. Beryozovka is the nearest rural locality.
