= Yefremkino =

Yefremkino Ефремкино
- Selo
- Location within Bashkortostan Location within Russia
- Coordinates: 54°16′N 56°15′E
- Country: Russia
- Region: Bashkortostan
- District: Karmaskalinsky District
- Time zone: UTC+5:00

Yefremkino (Russian: Ефремкино) is a rural locality (a selo) and the administrative centre of Yefremkinsky Selsoviet, Karmaskalinsky District, Bashkortostan, Russia. The population was 889 as of 2010. There are 17 streets.

== Geography ==
Yefremkino is located 17 km south of Karmaskaly (the district's administrative centre) by road. Dmitriyevka is the nearest rural locality.
