= Derevnya razyezda Ibragimovo =

Derevnya razyezda Ibragimovo Деревня разъезда Ибрагимово
- Village
- Location within Bashkortostan Location within Russia
- Coordinates: 54°28′N 56°11′E
- Country: Russia
- Region: Bashkortostan
- District: Karmaskalinsky District
- Time zone: UTC+5:00

Derevnya razyezda Ibragimovo (Russian: Деревня разъезда Ибрагимово; Bashkir: Ибраһим разъезы, İbrahim razyezı) is a rural locality (a village) in Savaleyevsky Selsoviet, Karmaskalinsky District, Bashkortostan, Russia. The population was 48 as of 2010. There is 1 street.

== Geography ==
The village is located 23 km north of Karmaskaly (the district's administrative centre) by road. Savaleyevo is the nearest rural locality.
