= Karlamanbash =

Karlamanbash Карламанбаш
- Village
- Location within Bashkortostan Location within Russia
- Coordinates: 54°14′N 56°06′E
- Country: Russia
- Region: Bashkortostan
- District: Karmaskalinsky District
- Time zone: UTC+5:00

Karlamanbash (Russian: Карламанбаш; Bashkir: Ҡарлыманбаш, Qarlımanbaş) is a rural locality (a village) in Starobabichevsky Selsoviet, Karmaskalinsky District, Bashkortostan, Russia. The population was 204 as of 2010. There is 1 street.

== Geography ==
Karlamanbash is located 15 km south of Karmaskaly (the district's administrative centre) by road. Novy Kuganak is the nearest rural locality.
