= Buzovyazbash =

Buzovyazbash Бузовьязбаш
- Village
- Location within Bashkortostan Location within Russia
- Coordinates: 54°15′N 55°45′E
- Country: Russia
- Region: Bashkortostan
- District: Karmaskalinsky District
- Time zone: UTC+5:00

Buzovyazbash (Russian: Бузовьязбаш; Bashkir: Боҙаяҙбаш, Boźayaźbaş) is a rural locality (a village) in Buzovyazovsky Selsoviet, Karmaskalinsky District, Bashkortostan, Russia. The population was 77 as of 2010. There is 1 street.

== Geography ==
Buzovyazbash is located 32 km southwest of Karmaskaly (the district's administrative centre) by road. Almalyk is the nearest rural locality.
