= Suuk-Chishma =

Suuk-Chishma Суук-Чишма
- Selo
- Location within Bashkortostan Location within Russia
- Coordinates: 54°27′N 55°57′E
- Country: Russia
- Region: Bashkortostan
- District: Karmaskalinsky District
- Time zone: UTC+5:00

Suuk-Chishma (Russian: Суук-Чишма; Bashkir: Һыуыҡшишмә, Hıwıqşişmä) is a rural locality (a selo) in Podlubovsky Selsoviet, Karmaskalinsky District, Bashkortostan, Russia. The population was 591 as of 2010. There are 12 streets.

== Geography ==
Suuk-Chishma is located 19 km northwest of Karmaskaly (the district's administrative centre) by road. Sarsaz is the nearest rural locality.
