= Matrosovka =

Matrosovka Матросовка
- Village
- Location within Bashkortostan Location within Russia
- Coordinates: 54°14′N 56°13′E
- Country: Russia
- Region: Bashkortostan
- District: Karmaskalinsky District
- Time zone: UTC+5:00

Matrosovka (Russian: Матросовка) is a rural locality (a village) in Yefremkinsky Selsoviet, Karmaskalinsky District, Bashkortostan, Russia. The population was 168 as of 2010. There are 2 streets.

== Geography ==
Matrosovka is located 20 km south of Karmaskaly (the district's administrative centre) by road. Bochkaryovka is the nearest rural locality.
