= Kabakovo =

Kabakovo Кабаково
- Selo
- Location within Bashkortostan Location within Russia
- Coordinates: 54°32′N 56°08′E
- Country: Russia
- Region: Bashkortostan
- District: Karmaskalinsky District
- Time zone: UTC+5:00

Kabakovo (Russian: Кабаково; Bashkir: Ҡабаҡ, Qabaq) is a rural locality (a selo) and the administrative centre of Kabakovsky Selsoviet, Karmaskalinsky District, Bashkortostan, Russia. The population was 3,141 as of 2010. There are 48 streets.

== Geography ==
Kabakovo is located 31 km north of Karmaskaly (the district's administrative centre) by road. Salzigutovo is the nearest rural locality.
