= Kustugulovo =

Kustugulovo Кустугулово
- Village
- Location within Bashkortostan Location within Russia
- Coordinates: 54°23′N 56°20′E
- Country: Russia
- Region: Bashkortostan
- District: Karmaskalinsky District
- Time zone: UTC+5:00

Kustugulovo (Russian: Кустугулово; Bashkir: Көстөғол, Köstöğol) is a rural locality (a village) in Karlamansky Selsoviet, Karmaskalinsky District, Bashkortostan, Russia. The population was 171 as of 2010. There are 2 streets.

== Geography ==
Kustugulovo is located 24 km east of Karmaskaly (the district's administrative centre) by road. Sakharozavodskaya is the nearest rural locality.
