= Iltuganovo =

Iltuganovo Ильтуганово
- Selo
- Location within Bashkortostan Location within Russia
- Coordinates: 54°20′N 55°59′E
- Country: Russia
- Region: Bashkortostan
- District: Karmaskalinsky District
- Time zone: UTC+5:00

Iltuganovo (Russian: Ильтуганово; Bashkir: Илтуған, İltuğan) is a rural locality (a selo) in Staromusinsky Selsoviet, Karmaskalinsky District, Bashkortostan, Russia. The population was 428 as of 2010. There are 7 streets.

== Geography ==
Iltuganovo is located 12 km southwest of Karmaskaly (the district's administrative centre) by road. Shaymuratovo is the nearest rural locality.
