= Murzino =

Murzino Мурзино
- Village
- Location within Bashkortostan Location within Russia
- Coordinates: 54°19′N 56°21′E
- Country: Russia
- Region: Bashkortostan
- District: Karmaskalinsky District
- Time zone: UTC+5:00

Murzino (Russian: Мурзино; Bashkir: Мырҙа, Mırźa) is a rural locality (a selo) in Novokiyeshkinsky Selsoviet, Karmaskalinsky District, Bashkortostan, Russia. The population was 172 as of 2010. There are 5 streets in the locality.

== Geography ==
Murzino is located 23 km southeast of Karmaskaly (the district's administrative centre) by road. Mukayevo is the nearest rural locality.
