= Nikitino, Republic of Bashkortostan =

Nikitino Никитино
- Village
- Location within Bashkortostan Location within Russia
- Coordinates: 54°14′N 55°36′E
- Country: Russia
- Region: Bashkortostan
- District: Karmaskalinsky District
- Time zone: UTC+5:00

Nikitino (Russian: Никитино) is a rural locality (a village) in Adzitarovsky Selsoviet, Karmaskalinsky District, Bashkortostan, Russia. The population was 127 as of 2010. There are 2 streets.

== Geography ==
Nikitino is located 47 km southwest of Karmaskaly (the district's administrative centre) by road. Staroyanbekovo is the nearest rural locality.
