= Muksinovo =

Muksinovo Муксиново
- Village
- Location within Bashkortostan Location within Russia
- Coordinates: 54°28′N 56°19′E
- Country: Russia
- Region: Bashkortostan
- District: Karmaskalinsky District
- Time zone: UTC+5:00

Muksinovo (Russian: Муксиново; Bashkir: Мөҡсин, Möqsin) is a rural locality (a village) in Savaleyevsky Selsoviet, Karmaskalinsky District, Bashkortostan, Russia. The population was 204 as of 2010. There are 11 streets.

== Geography ==
Muksinovo is located 88 km northeast of Karmaskaly (the district's administrative centre) by road. Okhlebinino is the nearest rural locality.
