= Novobabichevo =

Novobabichevo Новобабичево
- Village
- Location within Bashkortostan Location within Russia
- Coordinates: 54°12′N 56°08′E
- Country: Russia
- Region: Bashkortostan
- District: Karmaskalinsky District
- Time zone: UTC+5:00

Novobabichevo (Russian: Новобабичево; Bashkir: Яңы Бәпес, Yañı Bäpes) is a rural locality (a village) in Starobabichevsky Selsoviet, Karmaskalinsky District, Bashkortostan, Russia. The population was 163 as of 2010. There are 2 streets.

== Geography ==
Novobabichevo is located 24 km south of Karmaskaly (the district's administrative centre) by road. Starobabichevo is the nearest rural locality.
