= Derevnya stantsii Kabakovo =

Derevnya stantsii Kabakovo Деревня станции Кабаково
- Village
- Location within Bashkortostan Location within Russia
- Coordinates: 54°31′N 56°04′E
- Country: Russia
- Region: Bashkortostan
- District: Karmaskalinsky District
- Time zone: UTC+5:00

Derevnya stantsii Kabakovo (Russian: Деревня станции Кабаково; Bashkir: Ҡабак станцияһы, Qabak stantsiyahı) is a rural locality (a village) in Kabakovsky Selsoviet, Karmaskalinsky District, Bashkortostan, Russia. The population was 105 as of 2010. There is 1 street.

== Geography ==
The village is located 31 km north of Karmaskaly (the district's administrative centre) by road. Nizhnetimkino is the nearest rural locality.
