= Verkhneuglichino =

Verkhneuglichino Верхнеугличино
- Village
- Location within Bashkortostan Location within Russia
- Coordinates: 54°29′N 56°02′E
- Country: Russia
- Region: Bashkortostan
- District: Karmaskalinsky District
- Time zone: UTC+5:00

Verkhneuglichino (Russian: Верхнеугличино; Bashkir: Үрге Углич, Ürge Ugliç) is a rural locality (a village) in Kabakovsky Selsoviet, Karmaskalinsky District, Bashkortostan, Russia. The population was 19 as of 2010. There are 2 streets.

== Geography ==
Verkhneuglichino is located 19 km northwest of Karmaskaly (the district's administrative centre) by road. Verkhnetimkino is the nearest rural locality.
