= Aktyuba =

Aktyuba Актюба
- Village
- Location within Bashkortostan Location within Russia
- Coordinates: 54°22′N 55°56′E
- Country: Russia
- Region: Bashkortostan
- District: Karmaskalinsky District
- Time zone: UTC+5:00

Aktyuba (Russian: Актюба; Bashkir: Аҡтүбә, Aqtübä) is a rural locality (a village) in Staromusinsky Selsoviet, Karmaskalinsky District, Bashkortostan, Russia. The population was 103 as of 2010. There are 3 streets.

== Geography ==
Aktyuba is located 23 km west of Karmaskaly (the district's administrative centre) by road. Akkul is the nearest rural locality.
