= Utyaganovo, Karmaskalinsky District, Republic of Bashkortostan =

Utyaganovo Утяганово
- Selo
- Location within Bashkortostan Location within Russia
- Coordinates: 54°19′N 56°27′E
- Country: Russia
- Region: Bashkortostan
- District: Karmaskalinsky District
- Time zone: UTC+5:00

Utyaganovo (Russian: Утяганово; Bashkir: Үтәгән, Ütägän) is a rural locality (a selo) in Novokiyeshkinsky Selsoviet, Karmaskalinsky District, Bashkortostan, Russia. The population was 438 as of 2010. There are 6 streets.

== Geography ==
Utyaganovo is located 32 km east of Karmaskaly (the district's administrative centre) by road. Novye Kiyeshki is the nearest rural locality.
