= Ibragimovo, Karmaskalinsky District, Republic of Bashkortostan =

Ibragimovo Ибрагимово
- Village
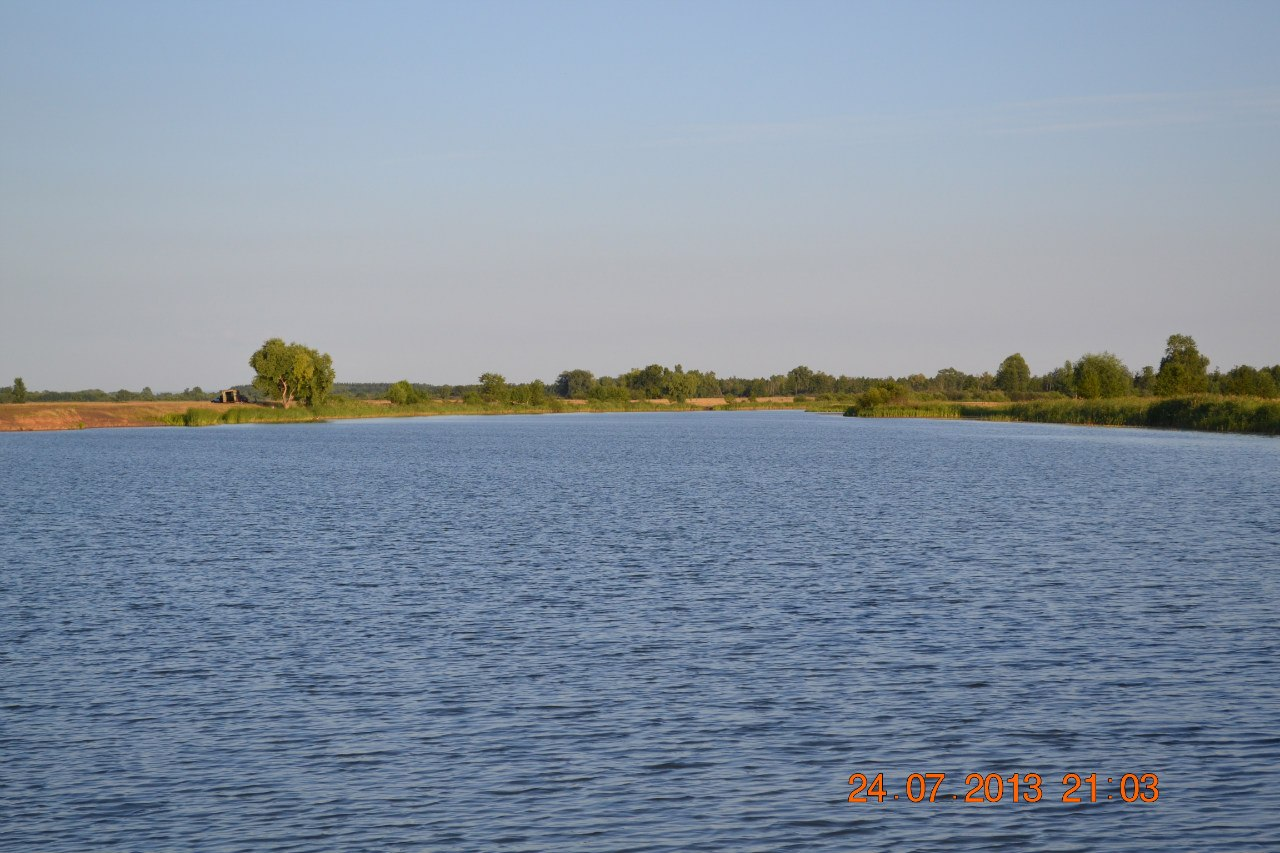

- Location within Bashkortostan Location within Russia
- Coordinates: 54°29′N 56°14′E
- Country: Russia
- Region: Bashkortostan
- District: Karmaskalinsky District
- Time zone: UTC+5:00

Ibragimovo (Russian: Ибрагимово; Bashkir: Ибраһим, İbrahim) is a rural locality (a village) in Savaleyevsky Selsoviet, Karmaskalinsky District, Bashkortostan, Russia. The population was 388 as of 2010. There are 11 streets.

== Geography ==
Ibragimovo is located 26 km north of Karmaskaly (the district's administrative centre) by road. Savaleyevo is the nearest rural locality.
