= Baltino =

Baltino Балтино
- Village
- Location within Bashkortostan Location within Russia
- Coordinates: 54°28′N 56°01′E
- Country: Russia
- Region: Bashkortostan
- District: Karmaskalinsky District
- Time zone: UTC+5:00

Baltino (Russian: Балтино; Bashkir: Балта, Balta) is a rural locality (a village) in Kabakovsky Selsoviet, Karmaskalinsky District, Bashkortostan, Russia. The population was 6 as of 2010. There is 1 street.

== Geography ==
Baltino is located 27 km northwest of Karmaskaly (the district's administrative centre) by road. Novomusino is the nearest rural locality.
