= Podlubovo, Karmaskalinsky District, Republic of Bashkortostan =

Podlubovo Подлубово
- Selo
- Location within Bashkortostan Location within Russia
- Coordinates: 54°21′N 55°50′E
- Country: Russia
- Region: Bashkortostan
- District: Karmaskalinsky District
- Time zone: UTC+5:00

Podlubovo (Russian: Подлубово) is a rural locality (a selo) and the administrative centre of Podlubovsky Selsoviet, Karmaskalinsky District, Bashkortostan, Russia. The population was 905 in 2010. There are eight streets.

== Geography ==
Podlubovo is located 33 kilometres (21 mi) west of Karmaskaly (the district's administrative centre) by road. Yakty-Kul is the nearest rural locality.
