= Staryye Kiyeshki =

Staryye Kiyeshki Старые Киешки
- Village
- Location within Bashkortostan Location within Russia
- Coordinates: 54°33′N 56°03′E
- Country: Russia
- Region: Bashkortostan
- District: Karmaskalinsky District
- Time zone: UTC+5:00

Staryye Kiyeshki (Russian: Старые Киешки; Bashkir: Иҫке Ҡыйышҡы, İśke Qıyışqı) is a rural locality (a village) in Kabakovsky Selsoviet, Karmaskalinsky District, Bashkortostan, Russia. The population was 581 as of 2010. There are 46 streets.

== Geography ==
Staryye Kiyeshki is located 36 km northwest of Karmaskaly (the district's administrative centre) by road. Olkhovoye is the nearest rural locality.
