= Novy Kuganak =

Novy Kuganak Новый Куганак
- Village
- Location within Bashkortostan Location within Russia
- Coordinates: 54°16′N 56°06′E
- Country: Russia
- Region: Bashkortostan
- District: Karmaskalinsky District
- Time zone: UTC+5:00

Novy Kuganak (Russian: Новый Куганак; Bashkir: Яңы Ҡуғанаҡ, Yañı Quğanaq) is a rural locality (a village) in Starobabichevsky Selsoviet, Karmaskalinsky District, Bashkortostan, Russia. The population was 76 as of 2010. There is 1 street.

== Geography ==
Novy Kuganak is located 11 km south of Karmaskaly (the district's administrative centre) by road. Karlamanbash is the nearest rural locality.
