= Vyazovka, Karmaskalinsky District, Republic of Bashkortostan =

Vyazovka Вязовка
- Village
- Location within Bashkortostan Location within Russia
- Coordinates: 54°28′N 55°49′E
- Country: Russia
- Region: Bashkortostan
- District: Karmaskalinsky District
- Time zone: UTC+5:00

Vyazovka (Russian: Вязовка) is a rural locality (a village) in Podlubovsky Selsoviet, Karmaskalinsky District, Bashkortostan, Russia. The population was 53 as of 2010. There are 12 streets.

== Geography ==
Vyazovka is located 30 km northwest of Karmaskaly (the district's administrative centre) by road. Boriskino is the nearest rural locality.
