= Kuyashkino =

Kuyashkino Куяшкино
- Village
- Location within Bashkortostan Location within Russia
- Coordinates: 54°28′N 56°28′E
- Country: Russia
- Region: Bashkortostan
- District: Karmaskalinsky District
- Time zone: UTC+5:00

Kuyashkino (Russian: Куяшкино; Bashkir: Ҡуяш, Quyaş) is a rural locality (a village) in Sakhayevsky Selsoviet, Karmaskalinsky District, Bashkortostan, Russia. The population was 78 as of 2010. There are 4 streets.

== Geography ==
Kuyashkino is located 29 km northeast of Karmaskaly (the district's administrative centre) by road. Simsky is the nearest rural locality.
