= Tansaitovo =

Tansaitovo Тансаитово
- Village
- Location within Bashkortostan Location within Russia
- Coordinates: 54°17′N 55°37′E
- Country: Russia
- Region: Bashkortostan
- District: Karmaskalinsky District
- Time zone: UTC+5:00

Tansaitovo (Russian: Тансаитово; Bashkir: Таңсәйет, Tañsäyet) is a rural locality (a village) in Adzitarovsky Selsoviet, Karmaskalinsky District, Bashkortostan, Russia. The population was 116 as of 2010. There is 1 street.

== Geography ==
Tansaitovo is located 43 km southwest of Karmaskaly (the district's administrative centre) by road. Yelizavetino is the nearest rural locality.
