= Staroshareyevo =

Staroshareyevo Старошареево
- Village
- Location within Bashkortostan Location within Russia
- Coordinates: 54°26′N 56°27′E
- Country: Russia
- Region: Bashkortostan
- District: Karmaskalinsky District
- Time zone: UTC+5:00

Staroshareyevo (Russian: Старошареево; Bashkir: Иҫке Шәрәй, İśke Şäräy) is a rural locality (a village) in Sakhayevsky Selsoviet, Karmaskalinsky District, Bashkortostan, Russia. The population was 565 as of 2010. There are 18 streets.

== Geography ==
Staroshareyevo is located 24 km northeast of Karmaskaly (the district's administrative centre) by road. Staroaktashevo is the nearest rural locality.
