= Mukayevo =

Mukayevo Мукаево
- Village
- Location within Bashkortostan Location within Russia
- Coordinates: 54°18′N 56°17′E
- Country: Russia
- Region: Bashkortostan
- District: Karmaskalinsky District
- Time zone: UTC+5:00

Mukayevo (Russian: Мукаево; Bashkir: Мөкәй, Mökäy) is a rural locality (a village) in Novokiyeshkinsky Selsoviet, Karmaskalinsky District, Bashkortostan, Russia. The population was 259 as of 2010. There are 11 streets.

== Geography ==
Mukayevo is located 20 km southeast of Karmaskaly (the district's administrative centre) by road. Kullyarovo is the nearest rural locality.
