= Ilteryakovo =

Ilteryakovo Ильтеряково
- Selo
- Location within Bashkortostan Location within Russia
- Coordinates: 54°25′N 56°01′E
- Country: Russia
- Region: Bashkortostan
- District: Karmaskalinsky District
- Time zone: UTC+5:00

Ilteryakovo (Russian: Ильтеряково; Bashkir: Илтирәк, İltiräk) is a rural locality (a selo) in Shaymuratovsky Selsoviet, Karmaskalinsky District, Bashkortostan, Russia. The population was 626 as of 2010. There are 12 streets.

== Geography ==
Ilteryakovo is located 12 km northwest of Karmaskaly (the district's administrative centre) by road. Grachyovka is the nearest rural locality.
