= Nikiforovka =

Nikiforovka Никифоровка
- Village
- Location within Bashkortostan Location within Russia
- Coordinates: 54°13′N 56°12′E
- Country: Russia
- Region: Bashkortostan
- District: Karmaskalinsky District
- Time zone: UTC+5:00

Nikiforovka (Russian: Никифоровка) is a rural locality (a village) in Yefremkinsky Selsoviet, Karmaskalinsky District, Bashkortostan, Russia. The population was 17 as of 2010. There is 1 street.

== Geography ==
Nikiforovka is located 22 km south of Karmaskaly (the district's administrative centre) by road. Alaygirovo is the nearest rural locality.
