= Bulyakay =

Bulyakay Булякай
- Village
- Location within Bashkortostan Location within Russia
- Coordinates: 54°20′N 55°46′E
- Country: Russia
- Region: Bashkortostan
- District: Karmaskalinsky District
- Time zone: UTC+5:00

Bulyakay (Russian: Булякай; Bashkir: Бүләкәй, Büläkäy) is a rural locality (a village) in Podlubovsky Selsoviet, Karmaskalinsky District, Bashkortostan, Russia. The population was 129 as of 2010. There are 2 streets.

== Geography ==
Bulyakay is located 39 km west of Karmaskaly (the district's administrative centre) by road. Sulu-Kuak is the nearest rural locality.
