= Sart-Chishma =

Sart-Chishma Сарт-Чишма
- Selo
- Location within Bashkortostan Location within Russia
- Coordinates: 54°21′N 56°26′E
- Country: Russia
- Region: Bashkortostan
- District: Karmaskalinsky District
- Time zone: UTC+5:00

Sart-Chishma (Russian: Сарт-Чишма; Bashkir: Һарт-Шишмә, Hart-Şişmä) is a rural locality (a selo) in Novokiyeshkinsky Selsoviet, Karmaskalinsky District, Bashkortostan, Russia. The population was 908 as of 2010. There are 13 streets.

== Geography ==
Sart-Chishma is located 26 km east of Karmaskaly (the district's administrative centre) by road. Pribelsky is the nearest rural locality.
