= Sart-Nauruzovo =

Sart-Nauruzovo Сарт-Наурузово
- Village
- Location within Bashkortostan Location within Russia
- Coordinates: 54°23′N 56°27′E
- Country: Russia
- Region: Bashkortostan
- District: Karmaskalinsky District
- Time zone: UTC+5:00

Sart-Nauruzovo (Russian: Сарт-Наурузово; Bashkir: Һарт-Наурыҙ, Hart-Nawrıź) is a rural locality (a village) in Pribelsky Selsoviet, Karmaskalinsky District, Bashkortostan, Russia. The population was 404 as of 2010. There are 3 streets.

== Geography ==
Sart-Nauruzovo is located 27 km east of Karmaskaly (the district's administrative centre) by road. Pribelsky is the nearest rural locality.
