= Kushkul, Karmaskalinsky District, Republic of Bashkortostan =

Kushkul Кушкуль
- Village
- Location within Bashkortostan Location within Russia
- Coordinates: 54°17′N 55°41′E
- Country: Russia
- Region: Bashkortostan
- District: Karmaskalinsky District
- Time zone: UTC+5:00

Kushkul (Russian: Кушкуль; Bashkir: Ҡушкүл, Quşkül) is a rural locality (a village) in Adzitarovsky Selsoviet, Karmaskalinsky District, Bashkortostan, Russia. The population was 75 as of 2010. There is 1 street.

== Geography ==
Kushkul is located 37 km southwest of Karmaskaly (the district's administrative centre) by road. Sulu-Kuak is the nearest rural locality.
