= Adzitarovo =

Adzitarovo Адзитарово
- Selo
- Location within Bashkortostan Location within Russia
- Coordinates: 54°19′N 55°39′E
- Country: Russia
- Region: Bashkortostan
- District: Karmaskalinsky District
- Time zone: UTC+5:00

Adzitarovo (Russian: Адзитарово; Bashkir: Атйетәр, Atyetär) is a rural locality (a selo) and the administrative centre of Adzitarovsky Selsoviet, Karmaskalinsky District, Bashkortostan, Russia. The population was 499 as of 2010. There are 5 streets.

== Geography ==
Adzitarovo is located 38 km west of Karmaskaly (the district's administrative centre) by road. Yelizavetino is the nearest rural locality.
