= Tazlarovo, Karmaskalinsky District, Republic of Bashkortostan =

Tazlarovo Тазларово
- Village
- Location within Bashkortostan Location within Russia
- Coordinates: 54°17′N 56°23′E
- Country: Russia
- Region: Bashkortostan
- District: Karmaskalinsky District
- Time zone: UTC+5:00

Tazlarovo (Russian: Тазларово; Bashkir: Таҙлар станцияһы, Taźlar stantsiyahı) is a rural locality (a village) in Novokiyeshkinsky Selsoviet, Karmaskalinsky District, Bashkortostan, Russia. The population was 69 as of 2010. There is 1 street.

== Geography ==
Tazlarovo is located 26 km southeast of Karmaskaly (the district's administrative centre) by road. Tubyak-Tazlarovo is the nearest rural locality.
