= Syskanovo =

Syskanovo Сысканово
- Village
- Location within Bashkortostan Location within Russia
- Coordinates: 54°24′N 56°26′E
- Country: Russia
- Region: Bashkortostan
- District: Karmaskalinsky District
- Time zone: UTC+5:00

Syskanovo (Russian: Сысканово; Bashkir: Сысҡан, Sısqan) is a rural locality (a village) in Sakhayevsky Selsoviet, Karmaskalinsky District, Bashkortostan, Russia. The population was 109 as of 2010. There are 2 streets.

== Geography ==
Syskanovo is located 27 km northeast of Karmaskaly (the district's administrative centre) by road. Krasnoyarovo is the nearest rural locality.
