= Kupriyanovka =

Kupriyanovka Куприяновка
- Selo
- Location within Amur Oblast Location within Russia
- Coordinates: 49°57′N 129°19′E
- Country: Russia
- Region: Amur Oblast
- District: Zavitinsky District
- Time zone: UTC+9:00

Kupriyanovka (Russian: Куприяновка) is a rural locality (a selo) and the administrative center of Kupriyanovsky Selsoviet of Zavitinsky District, Amur Oblast, Russia. The population was 334 as of 2018. There are 11 streets.

== Geography ==
Kupriyanovka is located 20 km south of Zavitinsk (the district's administrative centre) by road. Fyodorovka is the nearest rural locality.
