= Varshavka, Bashkortostan =

Varshavka Варшавка
- Village
- Location within Bashkortostan Location within Russia
- Coordinates: 54°22′N 56°06′E
- Country: Russia
- Region: Bashkortostan
- District: Karmaskalinsky District
- Time zone: UTC+5:00

Varshavka (Russian: Варшавка) is a rural locality (a village) in Shaymuratovsky Selsoviet, Karmaskalinsky District, Bashkortostan, Russia. The population was 105 as of 2010. There are 4 streets.

== Geography ==
Varshavka is located 6 km northwest of Karmaskaly (the district's administrative centre) by road. Karmaskaly is the nearest rural locality.
