= Starobabichevo =

Starobabichevo Старобабичево
- Village
- Location within Bashkortostan Location within Russia
- Coordinates: 54°11′N 56°08′E
- Country: Russia
- Region: Bashkortostan
- District: Karmaskalinsky District
- Time zone: UTC+5:00

Starobabichevo (Russian: Старобабичево; Bashkir: Иҫке Бәпес, İśke Bäpes) is a rural locality (a village) and the administrative centre of Starobabichevsky Selsoviet, Karmaskalinsky District, Bashkortostan, Russia. The population was 520 as of 2010. There are 7 streets.

== Geography ==
Starobabichevo is located 22 km south of Karmaskaly (the district's administrative centre) by road. Novobabichevo is the nearest rural locality.
