= Beryozovka, Karmaskalinsky District, Republic of Bashkortostan =

Beryozovka Берёзовка
- Village
- Location within Bashkortostan Location within Russia
- Coordinates: 54°18′N 56°04′E
- Country: Russia
- Region: Bashkortostan
- District: Karmaskalinsky District
- Time zone: UTC+5:00

Beryozovka (Russian: Берёзовка) is a rural locality (a village) in Karmaskalinsky Selsoviet, Karmaskalinsky District, Bashkortostan, Russia. The population was 12 as of 2010. There are two streets or roads.

== Geography ==
Beryozovka is located 11 km southwest of Karmaskaly (the district's administrative centre) by road. Kachevan is the nearest rural locality.
