= Derevnya stantsii Sakharozavodskaya =

Derevnya stantsii Sakharozavodskaya Деревня станции Сахарозаводская
- Village
- Location within Bashkortostan Location within Russia
- Coordinates: 54°22′N 56°22′E
- Country: Russia
- Region: Bashkortostan
- District: Karmaskalinsky District
- Time zone: UTC+5:00

Derevnya stantsii Sakharozavodskaya (Russian: Деревня станции Сахарозаводская; Bashkir: Шәкәр заводы станцияһы, Şäkär zavodı stantsiyahı) is a rural locality (a village) in Pribelsky Selsoviet, Karmaskalinsky District, Bashkortostan, Russia. The population was 82 as of 2010. There is one street.

== Geography ==
The village is located 22 km east of Karmaskaly (the district's administrative centre) by road. Pokrovka is the nearest rural locality.
