= Kamyshlinka =

Kamyshlinka Камышлинка
- Selo
- Location within Bashkortostan Location within Russia
- Coordinates: 54°14′N 56°19′E
- Country: Russia
- Region: Bashkortostan
- District: Karmaskalinsky District
- Time zone: UTC+5:00

Kamyshlinka (Russian: Камышлинка; Bashkir: Ҡамышлы, Qamışlı) is a rural locality (a selo) and the administrative centre of Kamyshlinsky Selsoviet, Karmaskalinsky District, Bashkortostan, Russia. The population was 417 as of 2010. There are 5 streets.

== Geography ==
Kamyshlinka is located 21 km southeast of Karmaskaly (the district's administrative centre) by road. Dmitriyevka is the nearest rural locality.
