= Antonovka, Karmaskalinsky District, Republic of Bashkortostan =

Antonovka Антоновка
- Village
- Location within Bashkortostan Location within Russia
- Coordinates: 54°16′N 56°12′E
- Country: Russia
- Region: Bashkortostan
- District: Karmaskalinsky District
- Time zone: UTC+5:00

Antonovka (Russian: Антоновка) is a rural locality (a village) in Yefremkinsky Selsoviet, Karmaskalinsky District, Bashkortostan, Russia. The population was 238 as of 2010. There are 3 streets.

== Geography ==
Antonovka is located 21 km south of Karmaskaly (the district's administrative centre) by road. Mursyakovo is the nearest rural locality.
