= Novomusino, Staromusinsky Selsoviet, Karmaskalinsky District, Republic of Bashkortostan =

Novomusino Новомусино
- Village
- Location within Bashkortostan Location within Russia
- Coordinates: 54°21′N 55°54′E
- Country: Russia
- Region: Bashkortostan
- District: Karmaskalinsky District
- Time zone: UTC+5:00

Novomusino (Russian: Новомусино; Bashkir: Яңы Муса, Yañı Musa) is a rural locality (a village) in Staromusinsky Selsoviet, Karmaskalinsky District, Bashkortostan, Russia. The population was 233 as of 2010.

== Geography ==
It is located 19 km from Karmaskaly and 1 km from Staromusino.
