= Preobrazhenovka, Zavitinsky District, Amur Oblast =

Preobrazhenovka Преображеновка
- Selo
- Location within Amur Oblast Location within Russia
- Coordinates: 50°02′N 129°26′E
- Country: Russia
- Region: Amur Oblast
- District: Zavitinsky District
- Time zone: UTC+9:00

Preobrazhenovka (Russian: Преображеновка) is a rural locality (a selo) and the administrative center of Preobrazhenovsky Selsoviet of Zavitinsky District, Amur Oblast, Russia. The population was 175 as of 2018. There are 5 streets.

== Geography ==
Preobrazhenovka is located 8 km south of Zavitinsk (the district's administrative centre) by road. Zavitinsk is the nearest rural locality.
