= Innokentyevka, Zavitinsky District, Amur Oblast =

Innokentyevka Иннокентьевка
- Selo
- Location within Amur Oblast Location within Russia
- Coordinates: 49°58′N 129°10′E
- Country: Russia
- Region: Amur Oblast
- District: Zavitinsky District
- Time zone: UTC+9:00

Innokentyevka (Russian: Иннокентьевка) is a rural locality (a selo) and the administrative center of Innokentyevsky Selsoviet of Zavitinsky District, Amur Oblast, Russia. The population was 239 as of 2018. There are 8 streets.

== Geography ==
Innokentyevka is located 29 km southwest of Zavitinsk (the district's administrative centre) by road. Ivanovka is the nearest rural locality.
