= Antonovka, Zavitinsky District, Amur Oblast =

Antonovka Антоновка
- Selo
- Location within Amur Oblast Location within Russia
- Coordinates: 49°51′N 129°22′E
- Country: Russia
- Region: Amur Oblast
- District: Zavitinsky District
- Time zone: UTC+9:00

Antonovka (Russian: Антоновка) is a rural locality (a selo) and the administrative center of Antonovsky Selsoviet of Zavitinsky District, Amur Oblast, Russia. The population was 447 as of 2018. There are 8 streets.

== Geography ==
Antonovka is located 32 km south of Zavitinsk (the district's administrative centre) by road. Raychikhinsk is the nearest rural locality.
