= Antonovka, Gafuriysky District, Republic of Bashkortostan =

Antonovka Антоновка
- Selo
- Location within Bashkortostan Location within Russia
- Coordinates: 53°59′N 56°16′E
- Country: Russia
- Region: Bashkortostan
- District: Gafuriysky District
- Time zone: UTC+5:00

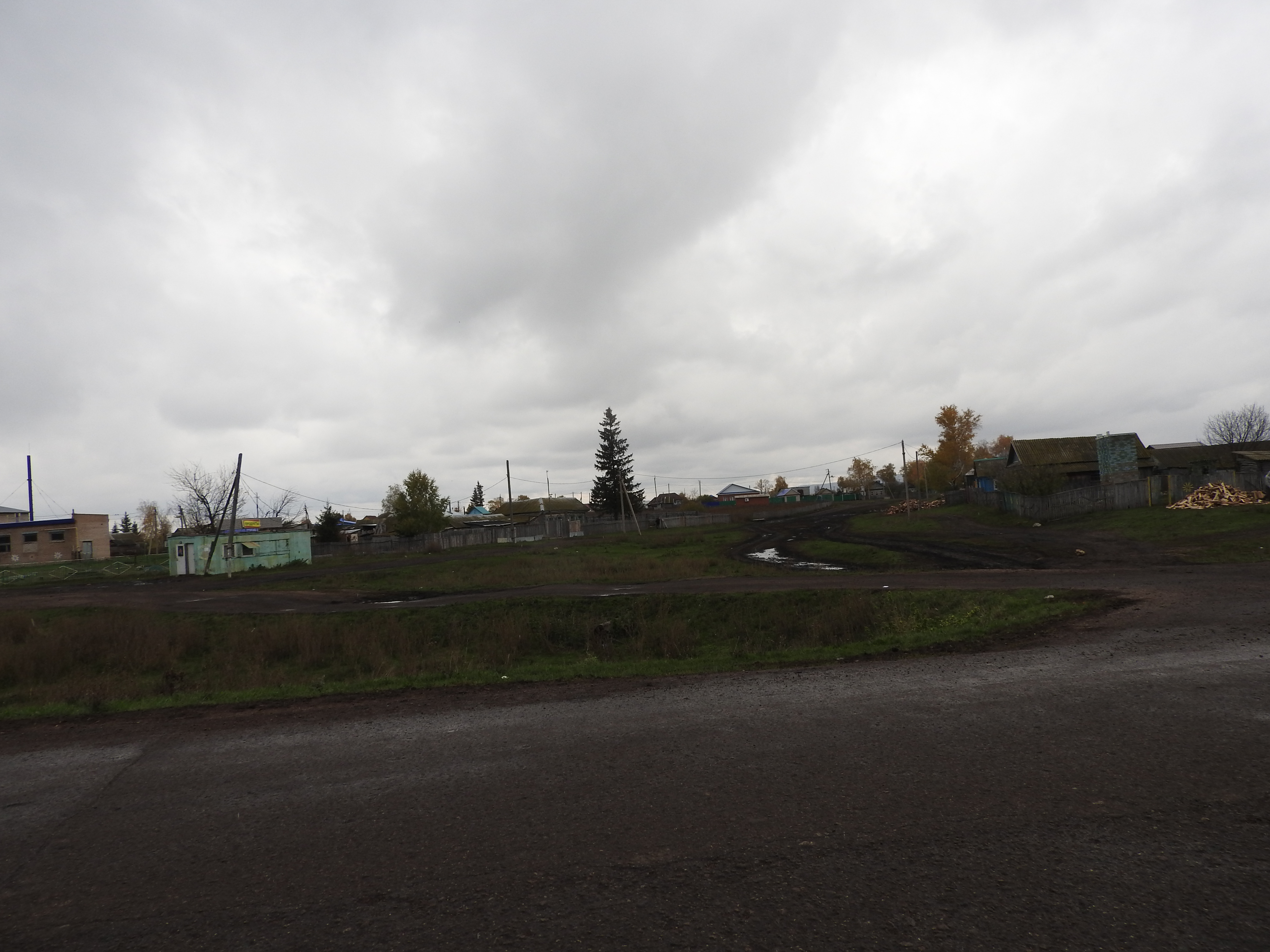
Ғафури районы Антоновка ауылы

Antonovka (Russian: Антоновка) is a rural locality (a selo) in Beloozersky Selsoviet, Gafuriysky District, Bashkortostan, Russia. The population was 592 as of 2010. There are 9 streets.

== Geography ==
Antonovka is located 21 km northwest of Krasnousolsky (the district's administrative centre) by road. Dmitriyevka is the nearest rural locality.
