= Antonovka, Meleuzovsky District, Republic of Bashkortostan =

Antonovka Антоновка
- Village
- Location within Bashkortostan Location within Russia
- Coordinates: 52°54′N 55°44′E
- Country: Russia
- Region: Bashkortostan
- District: Meleuzovsky District
- Time zone: UTC+5:00

Antonovka (Russian: Антоновка) is a rural locality (a village) and the administrative centre of Shevchenkovsky Selsoviet, Meleuzovsky District, Bashkortostan, Russia. The population was 443 as of 2010. There are 5 streets.

== Geography ==
Antonovka is located 20 km southwest of Meleuz (the district's administrative centre) by road. Ozerki is the nearest rural locality.
