= Antonovka, Mazanovsky District, Amur Oblast =

Antonovka Антоновка
- Selo
- Location within Amur Oblast Location within Russia
- Coordinates: 51°28′N 128°34′E
- Country: Russia
- Region: Amur Oblast
- District: Mazanovsky District
- Time zone: UTC+9:00

Antonovka (Russian: Антоновка) is a rural locality (a selo) in Krasnoyarovsky Selsoviet of Mazanovsky District, Amur Oblast, Russia. The population was 35 as of 2018. There is 1 street.

== Geography ==
Antonovka is located on the left bank of the Birma River, 35 km southwest of Novokiyevsky Uval (the district's administrative centre) by road. Petrovka is the nearest rural locality.
