= Antonovka, Arkharinsky District, Amur Oblast =

Antonovka Антоновка
- Village
- Location within Amur Oblast Location within Russia
- Coordinates: 49°25′N 129°56′E
- Country: Russia
- Region: Amur Oblast
- District: Arkharinsky District
- Time zone: UTC+9:00

Antonovka (Russian: Антоновка) is a rural locality (a selo) and the administrative center of Antonovsky Selsoviet of Arkharinsky District, Amur Oblast, Russia. The population was 91 in 2018. There are 10 streets.

== Geography ==
Antonovka is located 15 km west of Arkhara (the district's administrative centre) by road. Arkhara is the nearest rural locality.
