= Preobrazhenovka, Oktyabrsky District, Amur Oblast =

Preobrazhenovka Преображеновка
- Selo
- Location within Amur Oblast Location within Russia
- Coordinates: 50°25′N 128°38′E
- Country: Russia
- Region: Amur Oblast
- District: Oktyabrsky District
- Time zone: UTC+9:00

Preobrazhenovka (Russian: Преображеновка) is a rural locality (a selo) in Pereyaslovsky Selsoviet of Oktyabrsky District, Amur Oblast, Russia. The population was 104 as of 2018. There are 7 streets.

== Geography ==
Preobrazhenovka is located 39 km west of Yekaterinoslavka (the district's administrative centre) by road. Pereyaslovka is the nearest rural locality.
