= Antonovka, Bizhbulyaksky District, Republic of Bashkortostan =

Antonovka Антоновка
- Village
- Location within Bashkortostan Location within Russia
- Coordinates: 53°35′N 54°20′E
- Country: Russia
- Region: Bashkortostan
- District: Bizhbulyaksky District
- Time zone: UTC+5:00

Antonovka (Russian: Антоновка) is a rural locality (a village) in Yelbulaktamaksky Selsoviet, Bizhbulyaksky District, Bashkortostan, Russia. The population was 22 as of 2010. There is 1 street.

== Geography ==
Antonovka is located 13 km south of Bizhbulyak (the district's administrative centre) by road. Verkhnyaya Kurmaza is the nearest rural locality.
