= Innokentyevka, Arkharinsky District, Amur Oblast =

Innokentyevka Иннокентьевка
- Village
- Location within Amur Oblast Location within Russia
- Coordinates: 49°17′N 129°42′E
- Country: Russia
- Region: Amur Oblast
- District: Arkharinsky District
- Time zone: UTC+9:00

Innokentyevka (Russian: Иннокентьевка) is a rural locality (a selo) and the administrative center of Innokentyevsky Selsoviet of Arkharinsky District, Amur Oblast, Russia. The population was 405 in 2018. There are 12 streets.

== Geography ==
Innokentyevka is located on the left bank of the Amur River, 36 km southwest of Arkhara (the district's administrative centre) by road. Krasny Luch is the nearest rural locality.
