= Alexeyevka, Alexeyevsky District, Samara Oblast =

Alexeyevka Алексеевка
- Selo
- Interactive map of Alexeyevka
- Location of Alexeyevka Alexeyevka (Samara Oblast)
- Coordinates: 52°35′13″N 51°16′28″E
- Country: Russia
- Federal subject: Samara Oblast
- Administrative district: Alexeyevsky District
- SeloSelsoviet: Alexeyevka Settlement

Population (2010 Census)
  - Total: 4,513
  - Estimate (2021): 4,379 (−3%)

Administrative status
  - Capital of: Alexeyevsky District, Alexeyevka Settlement

Municipal status
  - Municipal district: Alexeyevsky Municipal District
  - Rural settlement: Alexeyevka Rural Settlement
  - Capital of: Alexeyevsky Municipal District, Alexeyevka Rural Settlement
- Time zone: UTC+4 (MSK+1)
- Postal code: 446640
- OKTMO ID: 36602408101

Alexeyevka (Russian: Алексеевка) is a rural locality (a selo) and the administrative center of Alexeyevsky District of Samara Oblast, Russia. Population: 4,513 (2010 census); 4,626 (2002 census); 4,846 (1989 Soviet census).
