= Zavitinsk (air base) =

Military airport in Amur Oblast, Russia

Zavitinsk
- Zavitinsk, Amur Oblast in Russia

Site information
- Type: Air Base
- Owner: Ministry of Defence
- Operator: Russian Air Force

Location
- Shown within Amur Oblast Zavitinsk (Russia)
- Coordinates: 50°11′30″N 129°30′12″E

Site history
- Built: 1946
- In use: 1946 - 1994

Airfield information
- Elevation: 276 metres (906 ft) AMSL
Runways
Direction	Length and surface
16/34	3,000 metres (9,843 ft) Concrete

Zavitinsk is an air base in Amur Oblast, Russia, located 9 km northeast of Zavitinsk. It was a major nuclear bomber base of the Long Range Aviation (a sister of Ukrainka). A revetment area exists on the far side of the runway with 18 large stands.

The regiment initially used the Ilyushin Il-4 between 1942 and 1951, then the Tupolev Tu-4 (NATO: Bull) between 1951 and 1957.

It began operating the Tupolev Tu-16 (NATO: Badger) aircraft late in the 1960s, serving a close/medium range facility as opposed to its long-range sister base Ukrainka.

Units stationed at Zavitinsk included:

- 303 TBAP (303rd Heavy Bomber Aviation Regiment) flying Tu-16s beginning in 1955 and upgrading to Tu-16Ks in 1972, and Tu-22Ks (ASCC: Blinder) around the 1980s.

The 303rd was formed 1941 as the 303rd Long-Range Bomber Aviation Regiment. In 1946, it was renamed the 303rd Bomber Aviation Regiment, and in 1951, renamed 303rd Heavy Bomber Aviation Regiment. It was part of the 84th Heavy Bomber Aviation Corps and then the 55th Heavy Bomber Aviation Division. It was disbanded 1994.
