= Alexeyevsky District, Samara Oblast =

Alexeyevsky District Алексеевский район (Russian)
- District
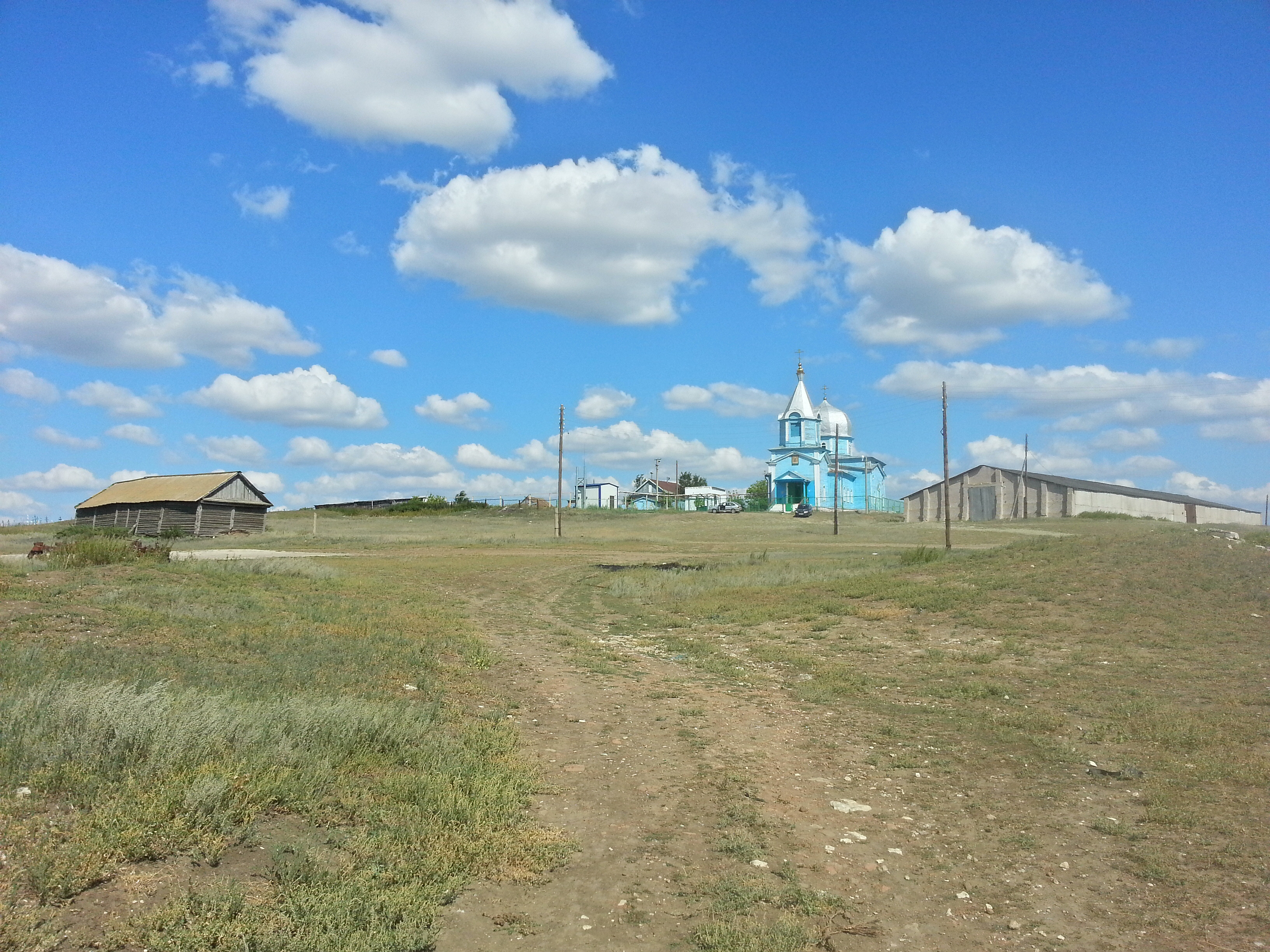
- Orekhovka, Alexeyevsky District

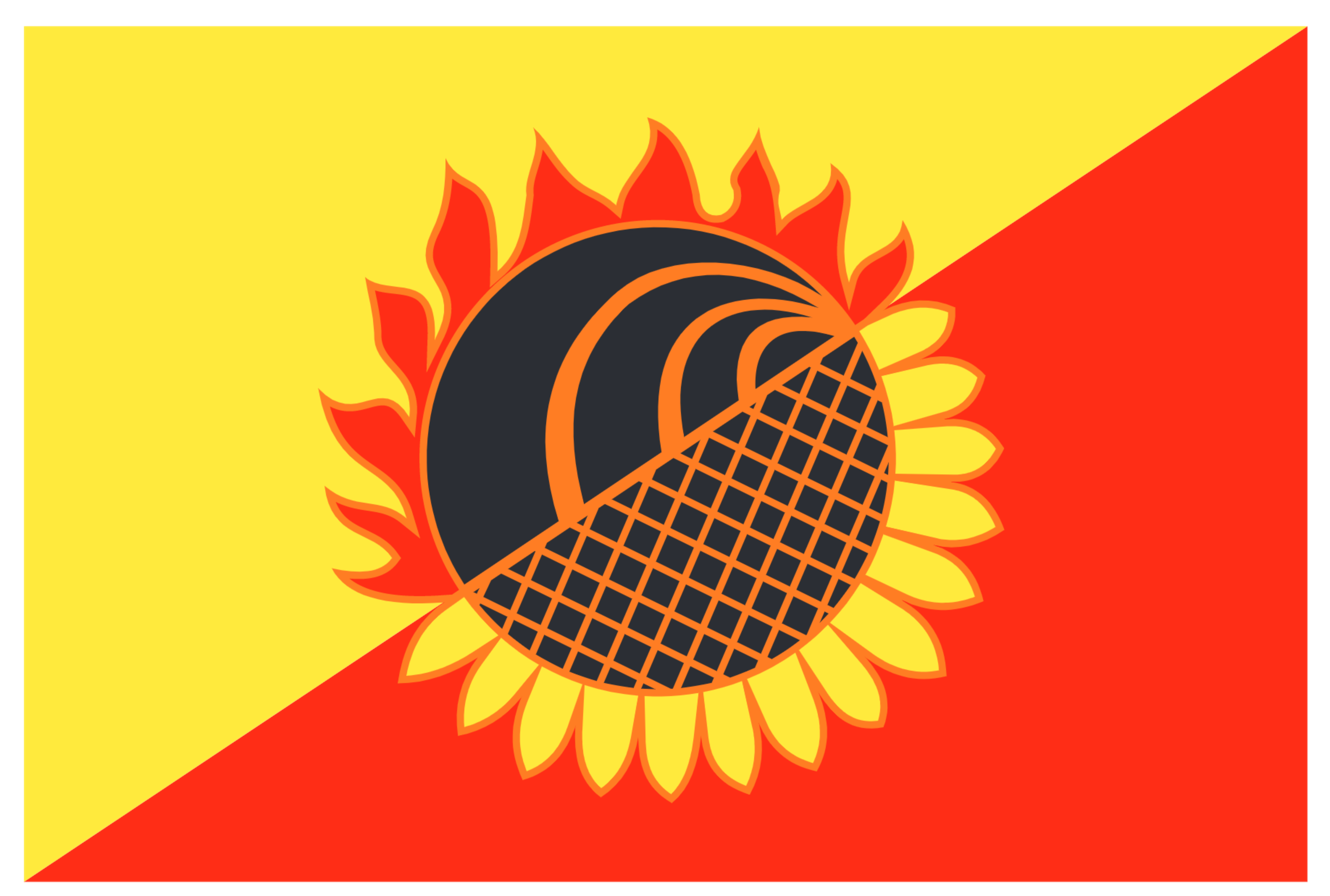
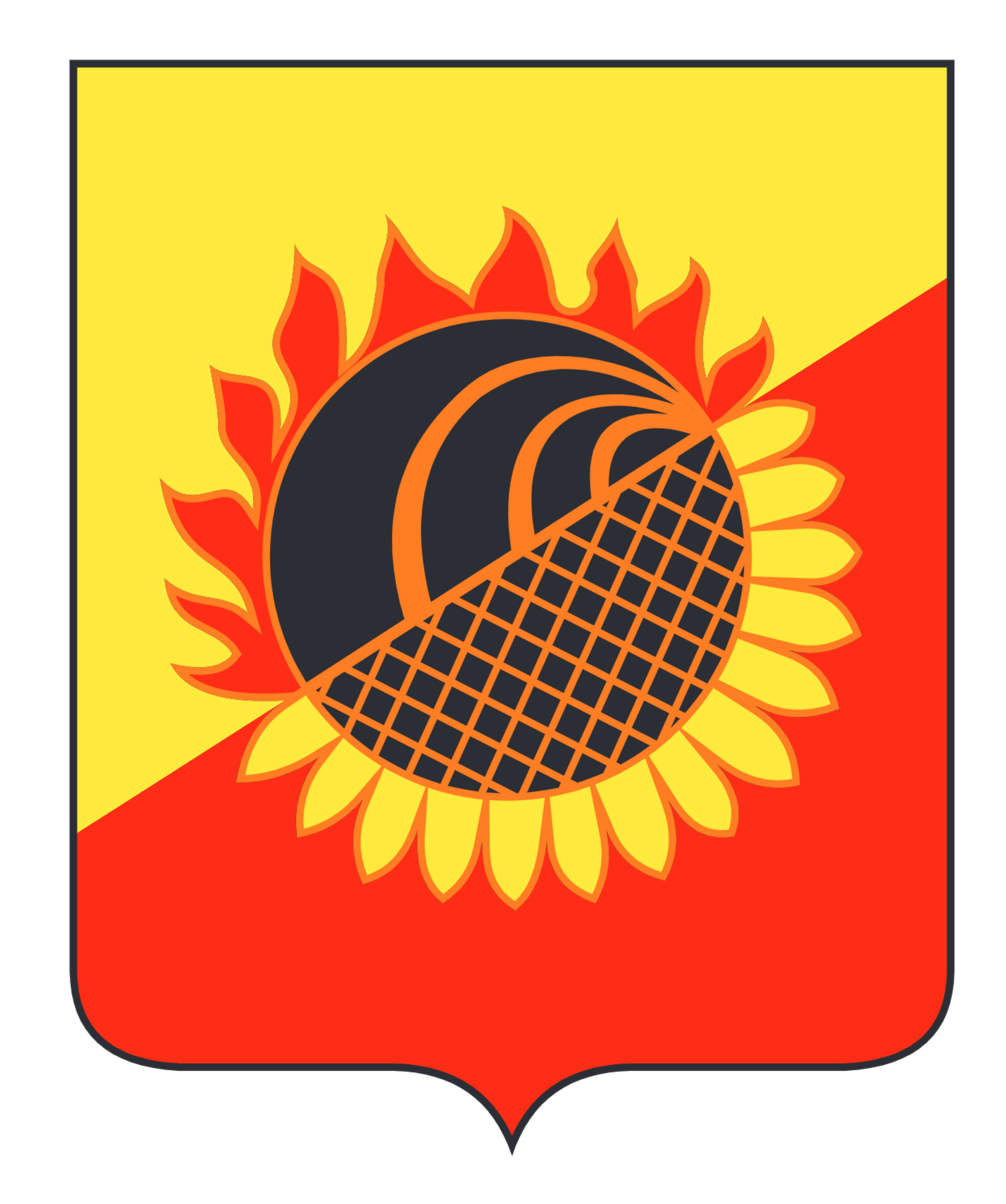
- Flag Coat of arms
- Location of Alexeyevsky District in Samara Oblast
- Coordinates: 53°15′12″N 50°29′12″E
- Country: Russia
- Federal subject: Samara Oblast
- Established: 16 July 1928
- Administrative center: Alexeyevka

Area
  - Total: 1,890 km^{2} (730 sq mi)

Population (2010 Census)
  - Total: 12,274
  - Density: 6.49/km^{2} (16.8/sq mi)
  - Urban: 0%
  - Rural: 100%

Administrative structure
  - Inhabited localities: 28 rural localities

Municipal structure
  - Municipally incorporated as: Alexeyevsky Municipal District
  - Municipal divisions: 0 urban settlements, 5 rural settlements
- Time zone: UTC+4 (MSK+1)
- OKTMO ID: 36602000
- Website: http://alexadm63.ru/

Alexeyevsky District (Russian: Алексе́евский райо́н) is an administrative and municipal district (raion), one of the twenty-seven in Samara Oblast, Russia. It is located in the southeast of the oblast. The area of the district is 1,890 square kilometers (730 sq mi). Its administrative center is the rural locality (a selo) of Alexeyevka. Population: 12,274 (2010 Census); 13,114 (2002 census); 13,813 (1989 Soviet census). The population of Alexeyevka accounts for 36.8% of the district's total population.
