= Zavitinsk =

Town in Amur Oblast, Russia

Zavitinsk Завитинск
- Town
- Interactive map of Zavitinsk
- Location of Zavitinsk Zavitinsk (Amur Oblast)
- Coordinates: 50°07′41″N 129°26′36″E
- Country: Russia
- Federal subject: Amur Oblast
- Administrative district: Zavitinsky District
- Urban settlementSelsoviet: Zavitinsk
- Founded: 1906
- Elevation: 230 m (750 ft)

Population (2010 Census)
  - Total: 11,481
  - Estimate (2023): 9,253 (−19.4%)

Administrative status
  - Capital of: Zavitinsky District, Zavitinsk Urban Settlement

Municipal status
  - Municipal district: Zavitinsky Municipal District
  - Urban settlement: Zavitinsk Urban Settlement
  - Capital of: Zavitinsky Municipal District, Zavitinsk Urban Settlement
- Time zone: UTC+9 (MSK+6)
- Postal code: 676870
- OKTMO ID: 10621101001
- Website: www.zavitinsk.ru

Zavitinsk (Russian: Завити́нск) is a town and the administrative center of Zavitinsky District in Amur Oblast, Russia. Population: 11,481 (2010 census); 14,248 (2002 census); 21,838 (1989 Soviet census).

== Administrative and municipal status ==
Within the framework of administrative divisions, Zavitinsk serves as the administrative center of Zavitinsky District. As an administrative division, it is, together with three rural localities, incorporated within Zavitinsky District as Zavitinsk Urban Settlement. As a municipal division, this administrative unit also has urban settlement status and is a part of Zavitinsky Municipal District.

== Military ==
Zavitinsk air base is located 9 kilometers (5.6 mi) northeast of the town.
