= Zavitinsky District =

Zavitinsky District Завитинский район (Russian)
- District
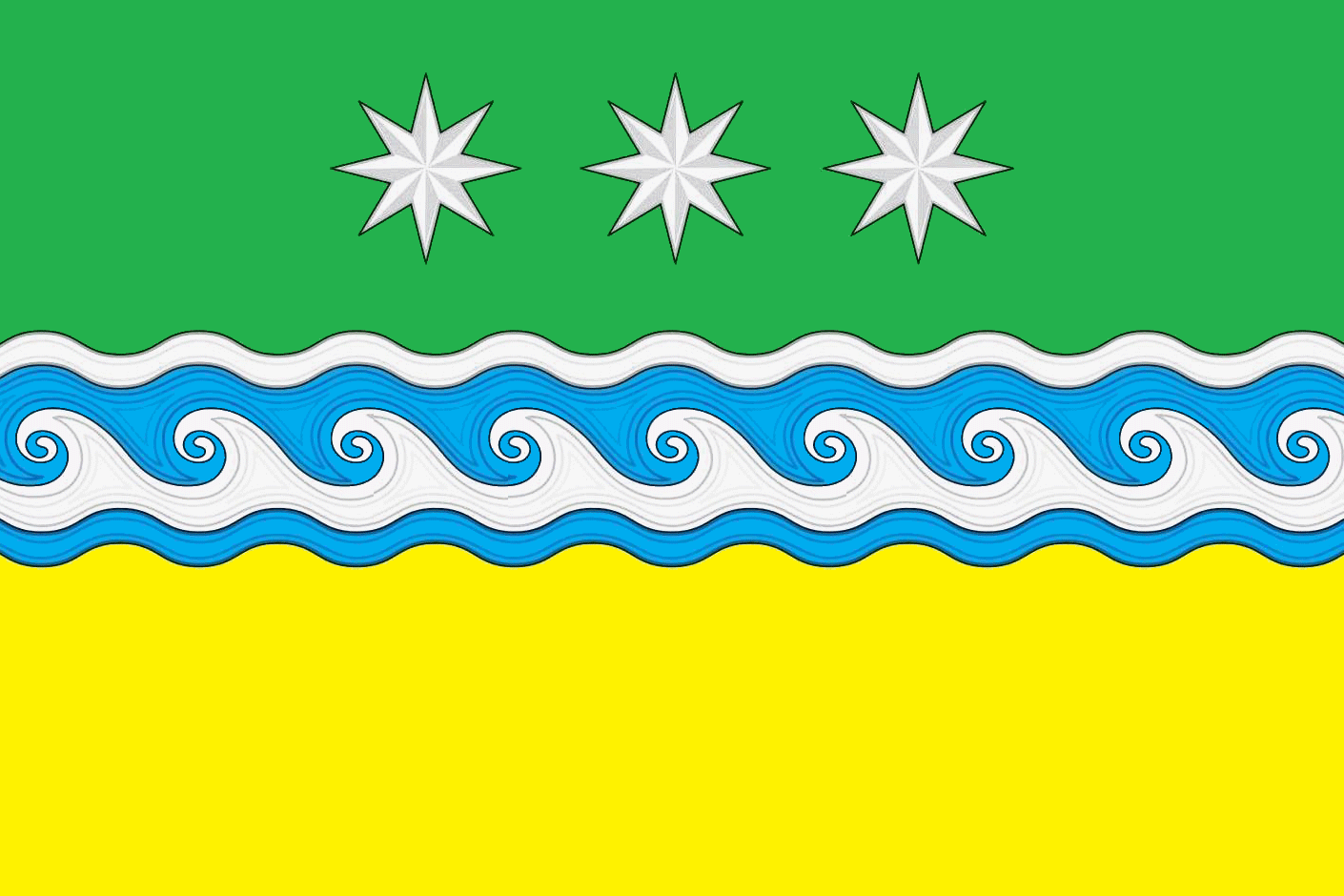
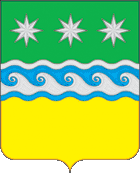
- Flag Coat of arms
- Location of Zavitinsky District in Amur Oblast
- Coordinates: 50°7′0.1″N 129°27′0.0″E
- Country: Russia
- Federal subject: Amur Oblast
- Established: 1926
- Administrative center: Zavitinsk

Area
  - Total: 3,286 km^{2} (1,269 sq mi)

Population (2010 Census)
  - Total: 15,970
  - Density: 4.860/km^{2} (12.59/sq mi)
  - Urban: 71.9%
  - Rural: 28.1%

Administrative structure
  - Administrative divisions: 1 Urban settlements, 9 Rural settlements
  - Inhabited localities: 1 cities/towns, 24 rural localities

Municipal structure
  - Municipally incorporated as: Zavitinsky Municipal District
  - Municipal divisions: 1 urban settlements, 9 rural settlements
- Time zone: UTC+9 (MSK+6)
- OKTMO ID: 10621000
- Website: http://www.zavitinsk.info/

Zavitinsky District (Russian: Завити́нский райо́н) is an administrative and municipal district (raion), one of the twenty in Amur Oblast, Russia. The area of the district is 3,286 square kilometers (1,269 sq mi). Its administrative center is the town of Zavitinsk. Population: 15,970 (2010 Census); 20,198 (2002 Census); 29,637 (1989 Soviet census). The population of Zavitinsk accounts for 71.9% of the district's total population.
