= Karmaskaly, Karmaskalinsky District, Bashkortostan =

Karmaskaly Кармаскалы
- Selo

Other transcription(s)
  - Bashkir: Ҡырмыҫҡалы
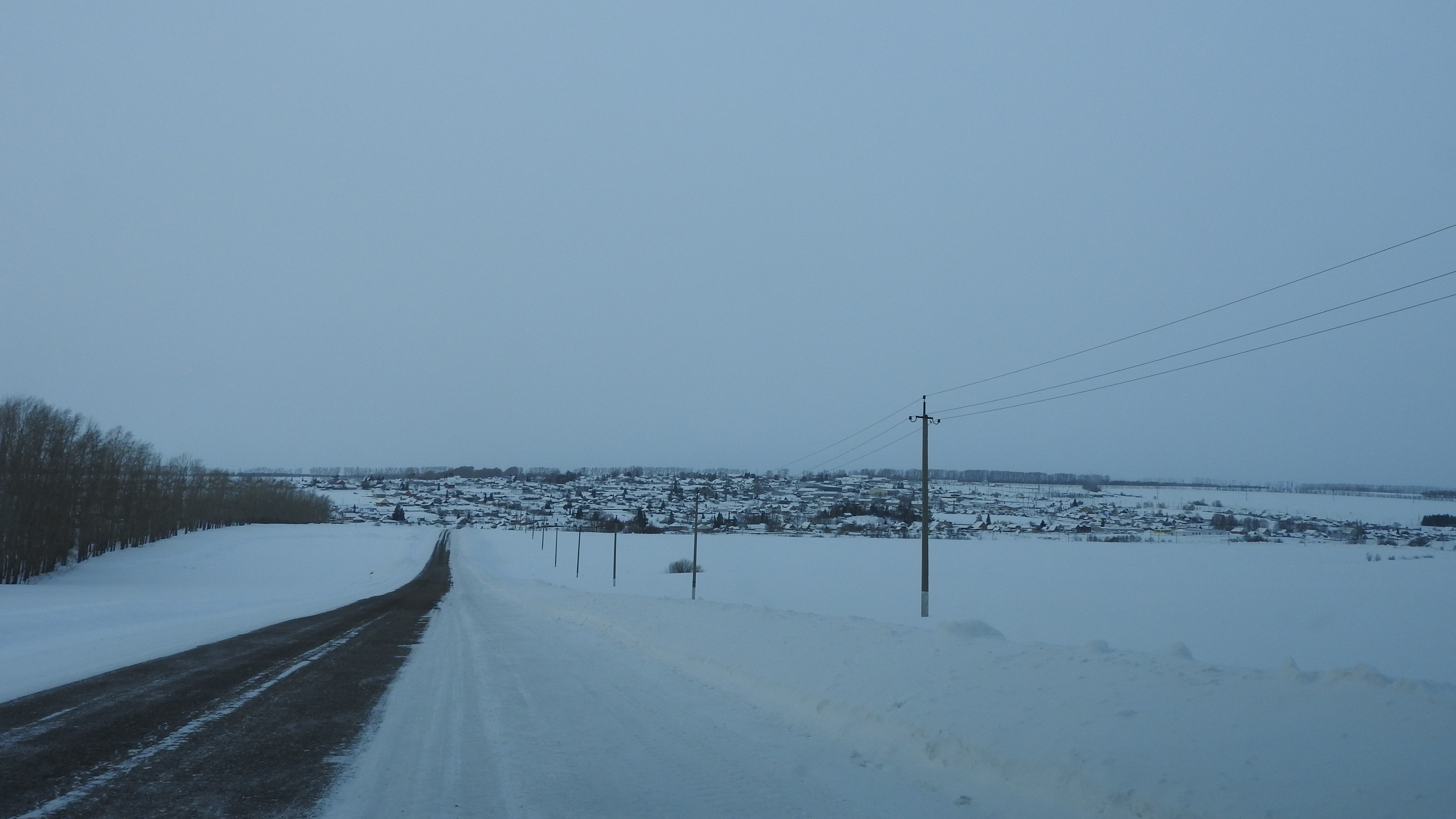
- Karmaskaly in winter
- Interactive map of Karmaskaly
- Location of Karmaskaly Karmaskaly (Bashkortostan)
- Coordinates: 54°22′10″N 56°10′40″E
- Country: Russia
- Federal subject: Bashkortostan
- Administrative district: Karmaskalinsky District
- SelsovietSelsoviet: Karmaskalinsky
- Founded: 1758

Population (2010 Census)
  - Total: 8,540
  - Estimate (2010): 8,540 (0%)

Administrative status
  - Capital of: Karmaskalinsky District, Karmaskalinsky Selsoviet

Municipal status
  - Municipal district: Karmaskalinsky Municipal District
  - Rural settlement: Karmaskalinsky Selsoviet Rural Settlement
  - Capital of: Karmaskalinsky Municipal District, Karmaskalinsky Selsoviet Rural Settlement
- Time zone: UTC+5 (MSK+2)
- Postal codes: 453009, 453020
- OKTMO ID: 80635435101

Karmaskaly population
- 2010 Census: 8,540
- 2002 Census: 7,843
- 1989 Census: 6,121
- 1979 Census: 4,861

Karmaskaly (Russian: Кармаскалы́; Bashkir: Ҡырмыҫҡалы, Qırmıśqalı) is a rural locality (a selo) and the administrative center of Karmaskalinsky District in the Republic of Bashkortostan, Russia. As of the 2010 Census, its population was 8,540.
