= Karmaskalinsky District =

Karmaskalinsky District Кармаскалинский район (Russian)
- District

Other transcription(s)
  - Bashkir: Ҡырмыҫҡалы районы
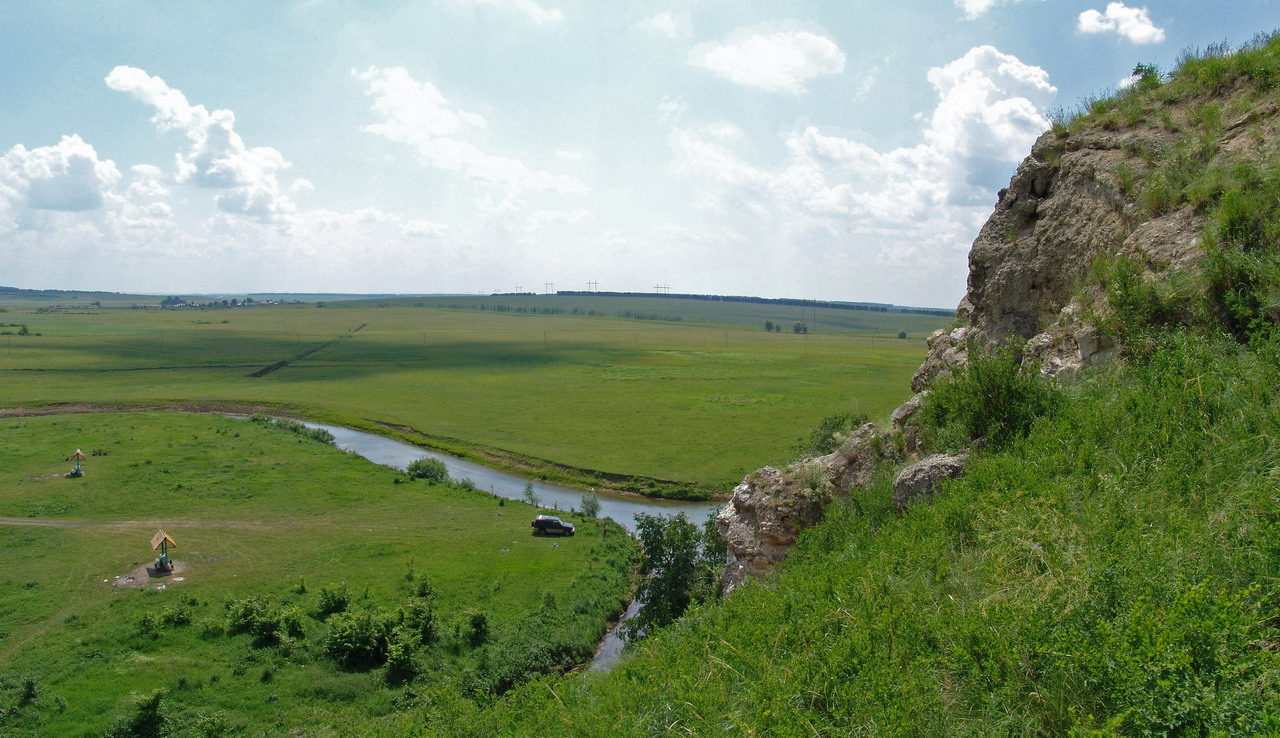
- RB Novomusino Blue Lake, Karmaskalinsky District

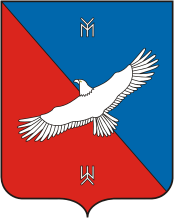
- Flag Coat of arms
- Location of Karmaskalinsky District in the Republic of Bashkortostan
- Coordinates: 54°22′N 56°11′E
- Country: Russia
- Federal subject: Republic of Bashkortostan
- Established: August 20, 1930
- Administrative center: Karmaskaly

Area
  - Total: 1,750 km^{2} (680 sq mi)

Population (2010 Census)
  - Total: 51,504
  - Estimate (2018): 49,792 (−3.3%)
  - Density: 29.4/km^{2} (76.2/sq mi)
  - Urban: 0%
  - Rural: 100%

Administrative structure
  - Administrative divisions: 16 Selsoviets
  - Inhabited localities: 122 rural localities

Municipal structure
  - Municipally incorporated as: Karmaskalinsky Municipal District
  - Municipal divisions: 0 urban settlements, 16 rural settlements
- Time zone: UTC+5 (MSK+2)
- OKTMO ID: 80635000

Population of Karmaskalinsky District
- 2010 Census: 51,504
- 2002 Census: 54,585
- 1989 Census: 46,376
- 1979 Census: 50,019

Karmaskalinsky District (Russian: Кармаскали́нский райо́н; Bashkir: Ҡырмыҫҡалы районы, Qırmıśqalı rayonı) is an administrative and municipal district (raion), one of the fifty-four in the Republic of Bashkortostan, Russia. It is located in the center of the republic and borders with Ufimsky and Iglinsky Districts in the north, Arkhangelsky District in the east, Gafuriysky District in the southeast, Aurgazinsky District in the south, Davlekanovsky District in the southwest, and with Chishminsky District in the west. The area of the district is 1,750 square kilometers (680 sq mi). Its administrative center is the rural locality (a selo) of Karmaskaly. As of the 2010 Census, the total population of the district was 51,504, with the population of Karmaskaly accounting for 16.6% of that number.

== History ==
The district was established on August 20, 1930.

== Administrative and municipal status ==
Within the framework of administrative divisions, Karmaskalinsky District is one of the fifty-four in the Republic of Bashkortostan. The district is divided into 16 selsoviets, comprising 122 rural localities. As a municipal division, the district is incorporated as Karmaskalinsky Municipal District. Its sixteen selsoviets are incorporated as sixteen rural settlements within the municipal district. The selo of Karmaskaly serves as the administrative center of both the administrative and municipal district.
