= Yuri Viktorovich Kuznetsov =

Soviet and Russian military officer (1946–2020)

- Native name: Юрий Викторович Кузнецов
- Born: 24 August 1946; Borzya, Chita Oblast, Soviet Union
- Died: 24 January 2020 (aged 73) Blagoveshchensk, Russia
- Allegiance: Soviet Union; Russia
- Branch: Soviet/Russian Airborne Forces
- Service years: 1964–2002
- Rank: General-major
- Commands: 345th Independent Guards Airborne Regiment; Far Eastern Higher Combined Arms Command School
- Conflicts: Soviet–Afghan War
- Awards: Hero of the Soviet Union; Order of Military Merit; Order of Lenin; Order of the Red Star; Order "For Service to the Homeland in the Armed Forces of the USSR", 1st & 2nd classes

Yuri Viktorovich Kuznetsov (Russian: Юрий Викторович Кузнецов; 24 August 1946 – 24 January 2020) was a Soviet and Russian military officer who held a number of posts in the Soviet and later Russian Armed Forces, reaching the rank of general-major. He served during the Soviet–Afghan War, receiving the title of Hero of the Soviet Union.

Kuznetsov entered the Soviet Army in 1964, and after studying at the Far Eastern Higher Combined Arms Command School he joined the 217th Guards Airborne Regiment, where he would spend the next several years, rising through the ranks and becoming a battalion commander. After further studies at the Frunze Military Academy, he was sent to Afghanistan with the 345th Independent Guards Airborne Regiment. He rose to command the regiment during his service during the Soviet–Afghan War, and was awarded the title of Hero of the Soviet Union in 1982. After further postings as deputy commander of the 106th Guards Airborne Division, commander of the 8th Guards Motor Rifle Division and deputy commander of the 35th Combined Arms Army, Kuznetsov's final military service was as head of the Far Eastern Higher Combined Arms Command School, before his retirement in 2002.

With his retirement from military life, Kuznetsov settled in Blagoveshchensk and became active in local government, serving as a deputy in the city and regional dumas, and as an advisor to the deputy governor on the region. He had received a number of awards during his career, and on his death in 2020, politicians at the local and national levels paid tribute to his service.

== Early life and career ==
Kuznetsov was born into a working-class family on 24 August 1946 in Borzya, then in Chita Oblast in the Soviet Union. He graduated from 10 high school classes and joined the Soviet Army in August 1964. After graduating from the Far Eastern Higher Combined Arms Command School with a specialisation in command and staff operational-tactical combined arms warfare in 1968, he entered the 217th Guards Airborne Regiment, based at Bolhrad in Odesa Oblast, in the Ukrainian SSR. He was a member of the Communist Party of the Soviet Union from 1970, and in 1973 completed the Vystrel officer-training course. During his time with the 217th Guards Airborne Regiment he rose from the position of a platoon commander to deputy company commander, company commander and finally battalion commander. In 1977 he entered the Frunze Military Academy for further studies.

== Afghanistan and later service ==
Graduating from the Frunze Military Academy in 1980, Kuznetsov was posted to the 345th Independent Guards Airborne Regiment as its deputy commander, and deployed with the unit to Afghanistan as part of the Soviet forces committed to the Soviet–Afghan War. He became the Regiment's commander in March 1982, holding the position until June 1982. For his service during the war, then Guards Lieutenant-Colonel Kuznetsov was awarded the title of Hero of the Soviet Union, with the accompanying Gold Star and the Order of Lenin, on 5 July 1982. This was award number 11477 of the Hero of the Soviet Union, and 399897 of the Order of Lenin. He then became deputy commander of the 106th Guards Airborne Division, and in 1984 took charge of the 8th Guards Motor Rifle Division. After studying at the Military Academy of the General Staff, Kuznetsov became deputy commander of the 35th Combined Arms Army. After the dissolution of the Soviet Union in 1991, Kuznetsov remained in the Russian Armed Forces, and from 1993 served as a general-major as head of the Far Eastern Higher Combined Arms Command School, the same institution he had graduated from at the start of his career. He retired from this post, and from military service, in October 2002.

== Civilian life ==
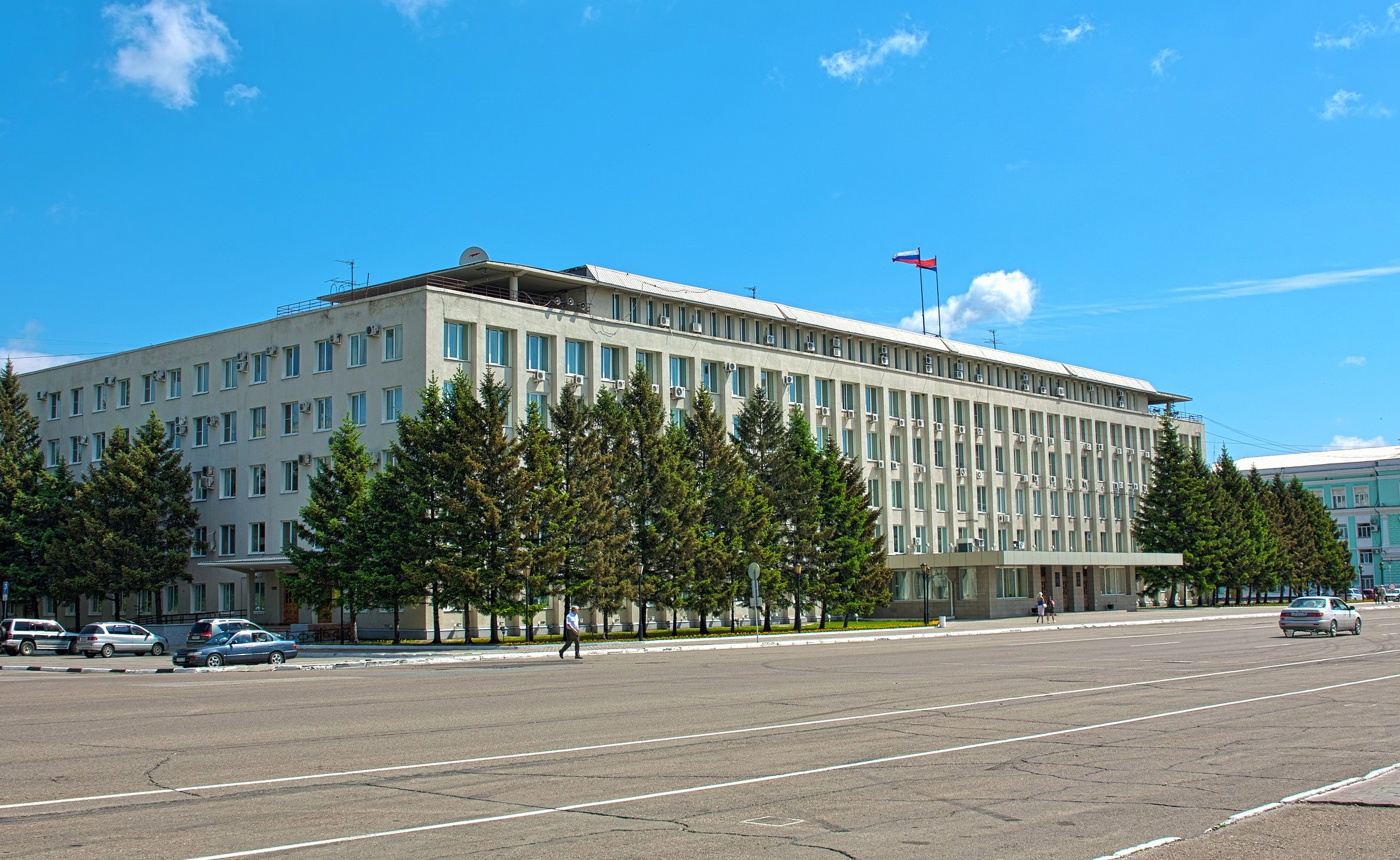
The seat of the administration of Amur Oblast in Blagoveshchensk. Kuznetsov sat on several of the city and regional assemblies.

Now retired from the military, Kuznetsov settled in Blagoveshchensk, Amur Oblast, where he became active in civil administration. From 2005 to 2007 he served as a deputy to the Amur Regional Council of People's Deputies IV convocation, and from 2 March 2008 was on the Legislative Assembly of Amur Oblast's V convocation. From 12 March 2008 he was chairman of the Assembly's Committee on Veterans Affairs, which from 23 May 2008 became the Committee on Veterans Affairs, Public Organizations and Youth Policy. In 2014 he became a deputy of the Blagoveshchensk City Duma's VI convocation for the city's 14th district, and the duma's deputy chairman for its VII convocation. He served for a time as an advisor to the deputy governor of the region. He was a member of United Russia. He had also worked as a docent at the Far Eastern Higher Combined Arms Command School.

== Death and legacy ==
Kuznetsov died on 24 January 2020, at age 73. Over his career he had received a number of awards in addition to that of Hero of the Soviet Union, including the Order of the Red Star on 17 August 1981, the Order "For Service to the Homeland in the Armed Forces of the USSR" second and third classes, and the Order of Military Merit on 3 January 1997, in addition to fourteen medals. He had also been created an honorary citizen of Blagoveshchensk. He was married with three sons. Condolences were offered and tributes paid by members of Blagoveshchensk City Council, with city Mayor Valentina Kalita describing him as "a strong-willed, energetic person and a true patriot of his country ... he always remained faithful to his duty and to the Fatherland. He was respected for his strength of character, honesty and decency [and] was an active participant in the public life of the city and region." Vasily Orlov, Governor of Amur Oblast, called him "the last Hero of the Soviet Union in the Far East" and wrote that "a talented, honest and generous person has left us. This is how he will remain in our memory." Alexander Kozlov, the Minister for the Development of the Russian Far East and Arctic, called him "honest, open, uncompromising, decent, energetic."

A bust of Kuznetsov was placed in the grounds of the Far Eastern Higher Combined Arms Command School. In 2020 the Amur Cadet Corps Boarding School was named after him. On 5 July 2022, a statue of Kuznetsov was unveiled on the square opposite the Far Eastern Higher Combined Arms Command School. The design of the monument was developed with the input of his family, and depicts Kuznetsov, in military uniform and with his cap in his hand, walking to work at the school.
