= 2023 Amur Oblast gubernatorial election =

Election

- 8–10 September 2023
- Turnout: 38.71%
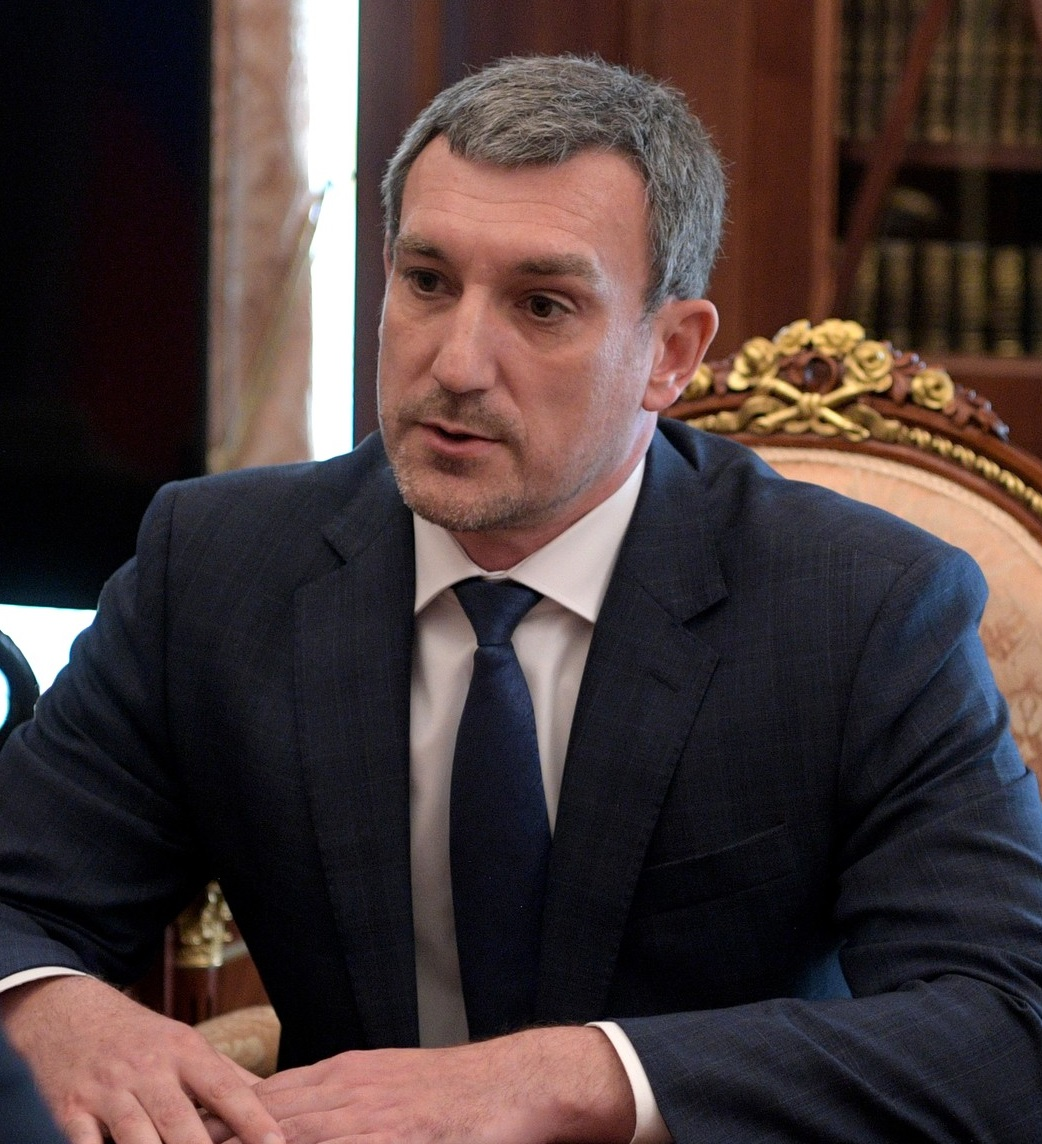
		CPRF
Candidate	Vasily Orlov	Boris Beloborodov
Party	United Russia	CPRF
Popular vote	192,134	18,417
Percentage	82.38%	7.90%
Governor before election
Vasily Orlov
United Russia
Governor-elect
Vasily Orlov
United Russia

The 2023 Amur Oblast gubernatorial election took place on 8–10 September 2023, on common election day. Incumbent Governor Vasily Orlov was re-elected to a second term in office.

== Background ==
In May 2018 first-term then-Governor Alexander Kozlov jointed Second Medvedev cabinet as Minister for Development of the Russian Far East. Sibur executive and former regional minister for economic development Vasily Orlov was appointed acting Governor of Amur Oblast on 30 May 2018. Orlov won 2018 election for a full term with 55.60%, narrowly avoiding a runoff with CPRF candidate Tatyana Rakutina.

Governor Orlov mostly stayed mum on his reelection plans throughout his term, however, during a meeting with President Vladimir Putin on 16 May 2023 the governor asked for support for his reelection, which was granted.

== Candidates ==
In Amur Oblast candidates for Governor can be nominated only by registered political parties, self-nomination is not possible. However, candidates are not obliged to be members of the nominating party. Candidate for Governor of Amur Oblast should be a Russian citizen and at least 30 years old. Candidates for Governor should not have a foreign citizenship or residence permit. Each candidate in order to be registered is required to collect at least 7% of signatures of members and heads of municipalities. Also gubernatorial candidates present 3 candidacies to the Federation Council and election winner later appoints one of the presented candidates.

=== Registered ===
- Boris Beloborodov (CPRF), businessman, former Amur Oblast Commissioner for Entrepreneurs' Rights (2020–2022)
- Vasily Orlov (United Russia), incumbent Governor of Amur Oblast (2018–present)
- Sergey Rafalsky (Communists of Russia), Member of Legislative Assembly of Amur Oblast (2021–present), businessman
- Roman Sanzharevsky (New People), IT businessman
- Yevgeny Zavgorordny (SR–ZP), urologist

=== Eliminated at United Russia convention ===
- Nadezhda Bagrova, Member of Legislative Assembly of Amur Oblast (2016–present)
- Andrey Rud, Member of Legislative Assembly of Amur Oblast (2016–present)

=== Declined ===
- Ivan Abramov (LDPR), Senator from Amur Oblast (2018–present), 2012 and 2015 gubernatorial candidate
- Roman Kobyzov (CPRF), Member of Legislative Assembly of Amur Oblast (2008–present), 2012 and 2015 gubernatorial candidate
- Kirill Zimin (SR–ZP), Member of Legislative Assembly of Amur Oblast (2016–present)

=== Candidates for Federation Council ===
- Boris Beloborodov (CPRF):
  - Roman Kobyzov, Member of Legislative Assembly of Amur Oblast (2008–present), 2012 and 2015 gubernatorial candidate
  - Tatyana Rakutina, former Member of Legislative Assembly of Amur Oblast (2005–2011), 2018 gubernatorial candidate
  - Vladimir Sedov, former Chairman of the Civic Chamber of Amur Oblast (2013–2020), retired FSB Major General
- Vasily Orlov (United Russia):
  - Ivan Abramov (LDPR), incumbent Senator from Amur Oblast (2018–present)
  - Nadezhda Bagrova, Member of Legislative Assembly of Amur Oblast (2016–present)
  - Pyotr Park, Deputy Chairman of the Government of Amur Oblast (2018–present)
- Sergey Rafalsky (Communists of Russia):
  - Gennady Gamza, aide to Legislative Assembly of Amur Oblast member Sergey Rafalsky, former Member of State Duma (1995–2003)
  - Sergey Loparev, businessman
  - Denis Minin, lawyer
- Roman Sanzharevsky (New People):
  - Vladislav Malinovsky, teacher
  - Pavel Ovsyannikov, businessman
  - Aleksandr Yan, businessman
- Yevgeny Zavgorodny (SR–ZP):
  - Igor Maryin, businessman
  - Roman Moiseyev, businessman
  - Kirill Zimin, Member of Legislative Assembly of Amur Oblast (2016–present)

== Results ==
Summary of the 8–10 September 2023 Amur Oblast gubernatorial election results
Candidate	Party	Votes	%
Vasily Orlov (incumbent)	United Russia	192,134	82.38
Boris Beloborodov	Communist Party	18,417	7.90
Yevgeny Zavgorodny	A Just Russia — For Truth	8,381	3.59
Roman Sanzharevsky	New People	5,254	2.25
Sergey Rafalsky	Communists of Russia	4,802	2.06
Valid votes		228,988	98.18
Blank ballots		4,243	1.82
Total		233,231	100.00
Turnout		233,231	38.71
Registered voters		602,539	100.00

Governor Orlov re-appointed incumbent Senator Ivan Abramov (LDPR) to the Federation Council.

== See also ==
- 2023 Russian regional elections
