= Amur constituency =

Constituency of the State Duma of the Russian Federation

Amur single-member constituency
- Constituency of the Russian State Duma

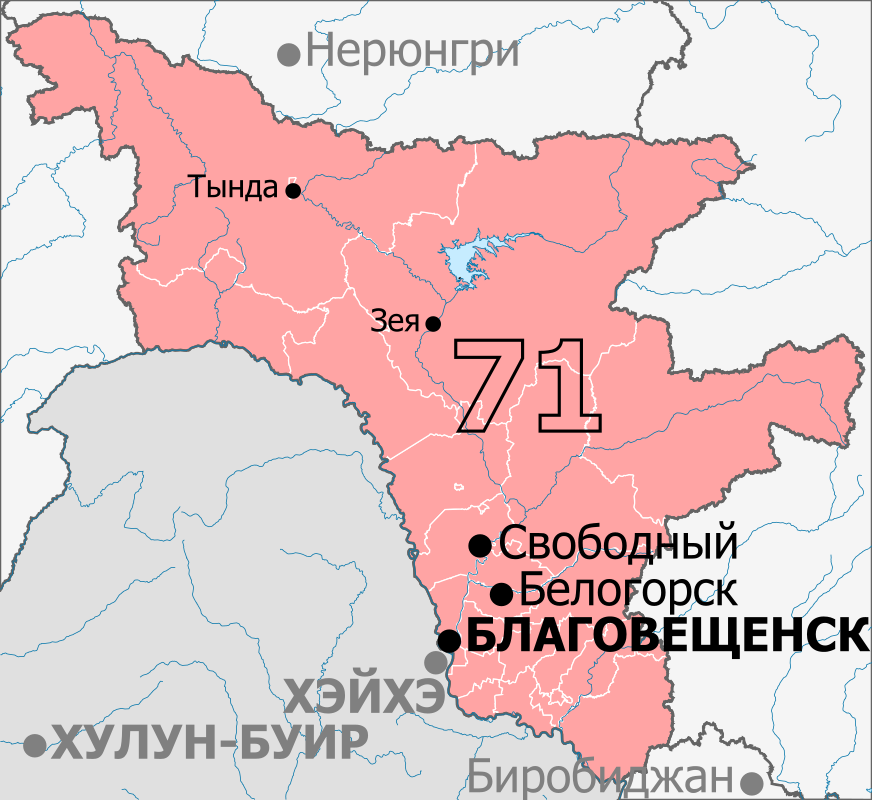
- Deputy: Vyacheslav Loginov; United Russia
- Federal subject: Amur Oblast
- Districts: Arkharinsky, Belogorsk, Belogorsky, Blagoveshchensk, Blagoveshchensky, Bureysky, Ivanovsky, Konstantinovsky, Magdagachinsky, Mazanovsky, Mikhaylovsky, Oktyabrsky, Progress, Raychikhinsk, Shimanovsky, Romnensky, Selemdzhinsky, Seryshevsky, Skovorodinsky, Shimanovsk, Svobodnensky, Svobodny, Tambovsky, Tsiolkovsky, Tynda, Tyndinsky, Zavitinsky, Zeya, Zeysky
- Voters: 589,576 (2026)

The Amur constituency (No.75 (Note: Blagoveshchensk constituency No.59 in 1993-1995, Blagoveshchensk constituency No.58 in 1995-2003, Blagoveshchensk constituency No.60 in 2003-2007, No.71 in 2016–2026)) is a Russian legislative constituency in Amur Oblast. The constituency encompasses the entire territory of Amur Oblast.

The constituency has been represented since 2021 by United Russia deputy Vyacheslav Loginov, former Chairman of the Legislative Assembly of Amur Oblast and businessman, who won the seat after defeating one-term Liberal Democratic incumbent Andrey Kuzmin.

== Boundaries ==
1993–2007, 2016–present: Arkharinsky District, Belogorsk, Belogorsky District, Blagoveshchensk, Blagoveshchensky District, Bureysky District, Ivanovsky District, Konstantinovsky District, Magdagachinsky District, Mazanovsky District, Mikhaylovsky District, Oktyabrsky District, Progress, Raychikhinsk, Shimanovsky District, Romnensky District, Selemdzhinsky District, Seryshevsky District, Skovorodinsky District, Shimanovsk, Svobodnensky District, Svobodny, Tambovsky District, Tsiolkovsky, Tynda, Tyndinsky District, Zavitinsky District, Zeya, Zeysky District
The constituency has been covering the entirety of Amur Oblast since its initial creation in 1993.

== Members elected ==
Election	Member	Party
1993	Andrey Zakharov	Civic Union
1995	Leonid Korotkov (Note: elected Governor of Amur Oblast in April 2001)	Independent
1999	Leonid Korotkov	Independent
2001	Aleksandr Vinidiktov	Independent
2003	Boris Vinogradov	Independent
2007	Proportional representation - no election by constituency	
2011	Proportional representation - no election by constituency	
2016	Ivan Abramov (Note: resigned in June 2018)	Liberal Democratic Party
2018	Andrey Kuzmin	Liberal Democratic Party
2021	Vyacheslav Loginov	United Russia
2026	Vyacheslav Loginov	United Russia

== Election results ==
=== 1993 ===
Summary of the 12 December 1993 Russian legislative election in the Blagoveshchensk constituency
Candidate	Party	Votes	%
Andrey Zakharov	Civic Union	123,509	32.42%
Nikolay Kolyadinsky	Independent	–	28.65%
Viktor Degtyaryov	Independent	–	–
Total		380,996	100%

=== 1995 ===
Summary of the 17 December 1995 Russian legislative election in the Blagoveshchensk constituency
Candidate	Party	Votes	%
Leonid Korotkov	Independent	181,444	39.21%
Valery Voshchevoz	For the Motherland!	69,424	15.00%
Andrey Zakharov (incumbent)	Independent	42,885	9.27%
Svetlana Ponosova	Our Home – Russia	31,218	6.75%
Yury Semenov	Liberal Democratic Party	25,985	5.62%
Oleg Morar	Independent	24,701	5.34%
Nikolay Sheludko	Independent	14,902	3.22%
Leonid Dudchenko	Independent	11,193	2.42%
Viktor Peskovets	Independent	10,927	2.36%
against all		45,321	9.79%
Total		462,709	100%

=== 1999 ===
Summary of the 19 December 1999 Russian legislative election in the Blagoveshchensk constituency
Candidate	Party	Votes	%
Leonid Korotkov (incumbent)	Independent	71,065	16.76%
Gennady Gamza	Communist Party	63,373	14.95%
Galina Buslova	Independent	42,467	10.02%
Vladimir Dorovskikh	Independent	35,702	8.42%
Konstantin Gunbin	Independent	30,726	7.25%
Aleksandr Vinidiktov	Independent	26,844	6.33%
Lyubov Khashcheva	Yabloko	25,492	6.01%
Andrey Lushchey	Independent	23,324	5.50%
Aleksandr Bondar	Independent	20,994	4.95%
Sergey Lopatkin	Independent	12,162	2.87%
Andrey Guk	Independent	5,277	1.24%
against all		59,678	14.08%
Total		423,940	100%

=== 2001 ===
Results by district: Aleksandr Vinidiktov: 20–30% 30–40% 40–50% 60–70%; Dmitry Novikov: 20–30% 30–40% 40–50%

Summary of the 7 October 2001 by-election in the Blagoveshchensk constituency
Candidate	Party	Votes	%
Aleksandr Vinidiktov	Independent	46,493	27.47%
Dmitry Novikov	Independent	46,207	27.30%
Ivan Ryazhskikh	Independent	20,563	12.15%
Sergey Semenov	Independent	20,448	12.08%
Aleksandr Fokin	Independent	11,723	6.93%
against all		41,339	12.03%
Total		343,859	100%

=== 2003 ===
Results by district: Boris Vinogradov: 20–30% 30–40%; Vasily Lysenko: 10–20% 20–30% 30–40%; Aleksandr Vinidiktov: 20–30% 30–40%; Anatoly Belonogov: 10–20% 20–30%

Summary of the 7 December 2003 Russian legislative election in the Blagoveshchensk constituency
Candidate	Party	Votes	%
Boris Vinogradov	Independent	76,153	22.16%
Vasily Lysenko	Independent	46,722	13.60%
Aleksandr Vinidiktov (incumbent)	Independent	45,228	13.16%
Anatoly Belonogov	Agrarian Party	42,749	12.44%
Gennady Gamza	Communist Party	37,667	10.96%
Oksana Bulat	Great Russia–Eurasian Union	9,953	2.90%
Irina Zubova	People's Party	9,691	2.82%
Gennady Petrov	Russian Pensioners' Party–Party of Social Justice	7,735	2.25%
Ivan Ryazhskikh	Party of Russia's Rebirth–Russian Party of Life	7,581	2.21%
Aleksandr Naydenov	Yabloko	6,845	1.99%
Sergey Derkach	Union of Right Forces	4,808	1.40%
Aleksandr Kuzmin	Independent	2,444	0.71%
against all		17,461	9.10%
Total		191,990	100%

=== 2016 ===
Summary of the 18 September 2016 Russian legislative election in the Amur constituency
Candidate	Party	Votes	%
Ivan Abramov	Liberal Democratic Party	123,762	45.98%
Roman Kobyzov	Communist Party	46,571	17.30%
Kirill Zimin	A Just Russia	26,894	9.99%
Yevgeny Volkov	Communists of Russia	18,335	6.81%
Natalya Kalinina	Yabloko	13,013	4.83%
Roman Barilo	Rodina	12,411	4.61%
Valery Parshinkov	The Greens	10,941	4.07%
Total		269,148	100%

=== 2018 ===
Results by district: Andrey Kuzmin: 20–30% 30–40% 40–50% 50–60%; Tatyana Rakutina: 20–30% 30–40%

Summary of the 9 September 2018 by-election in the Amur constituency
Candidate	Party	Votes	%
Andrey Kuzmin	Liberal Democratic Party	61,301	31.64%
Tatyana Rakutina	Communist Party	57,396	29.62%
Kirill Zimin	A Just Russia	26,170	13.51%
Gennady Gamza	Communists of Russia	20,556	10.61%
Galina Nikishina	Party of Pensioners	16,676	8.61%
Total		193,742	100%

=== 2021 ===
Summary of the 17-19 September 2021 Russian legislative election in the Amur constituency
Candidate	Party	Votes	%
Vyacheslav Loginov	United Russia	80,246	32.15%
Roman Kobyzov	Communist Party	49,490	19.83%
Andrey Kuzmin (incumbent)	Liberal Democratic Party	30,565	12.25%
Gennady Gamza	Communists of Russia	27,948	11.20%
Kirill Zimin	A Just Russia — For Truth	22,577	9.05%
Aleksandr Dodonov	New People	15,136	6.06%
Andrey Shmoylov	Party of Pensioners	9,089	3.64%
Total		249,565	100%

=== 2026 ===
Summary of the 18-20 September 2026 Russian legislative election in the Amur constituency
Candidate	Party	Votes	%
Vyacheslav Loginov (incumbent)	United Russia	175,214	54.32%
Roman Kobyzov	Communist Party	42,869	13.29%
Mikhail Zotov	Liberal Democratic Party	29,241	9.07%
Kirill Zimin	A Just Russia	27,909	8.65%
Sergey Kozanenko	New People	22,075	6.84%
Sergey Rafalsky	Communists of Russia	14,607	4.53%
Total		322,537	100%
