= 2026 Amur Oblast legislative election =

Regional legislative election in Russia

- 18–20 September 2026

All 27 seats in the Legislative Assembly 14 seats needed for a majority
- Turnout: 54.53% ▲13.91 pp
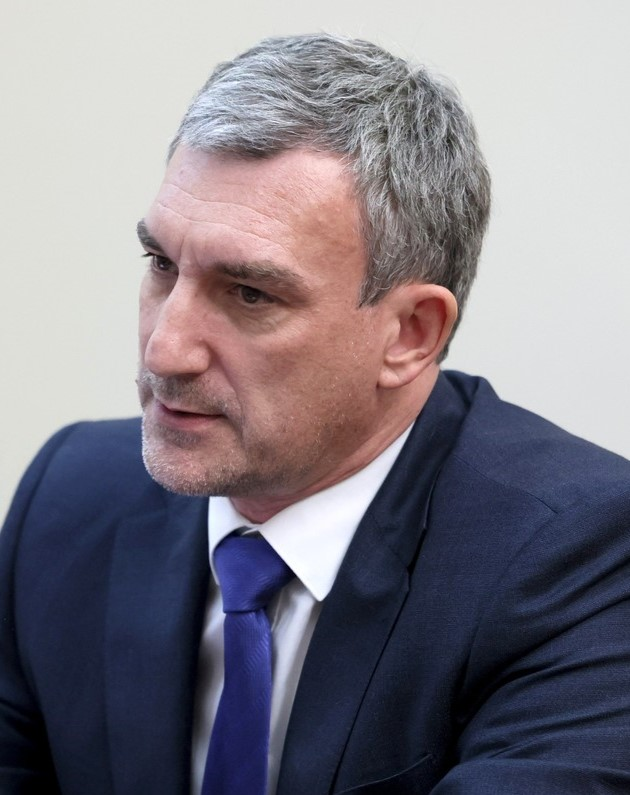

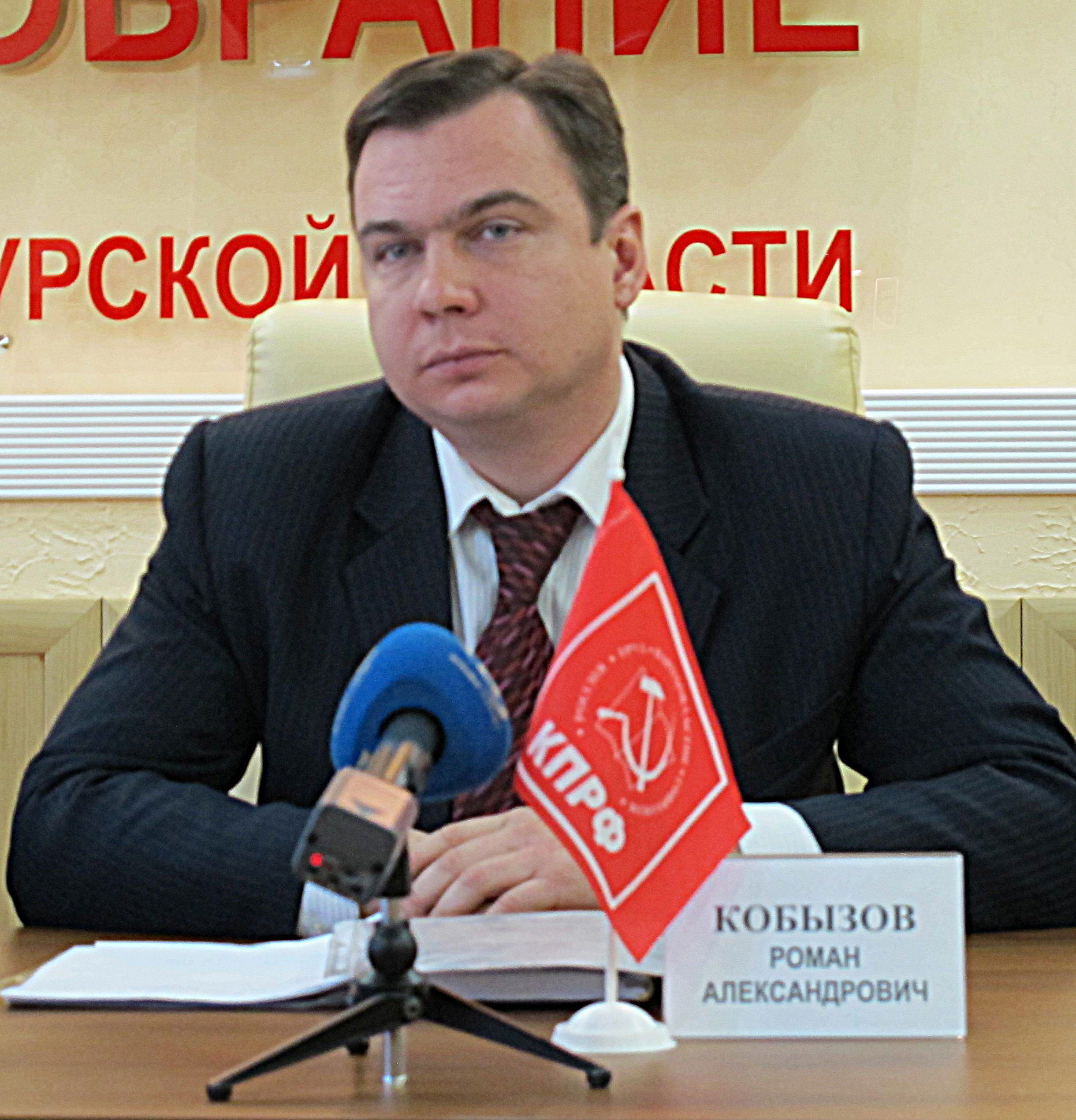

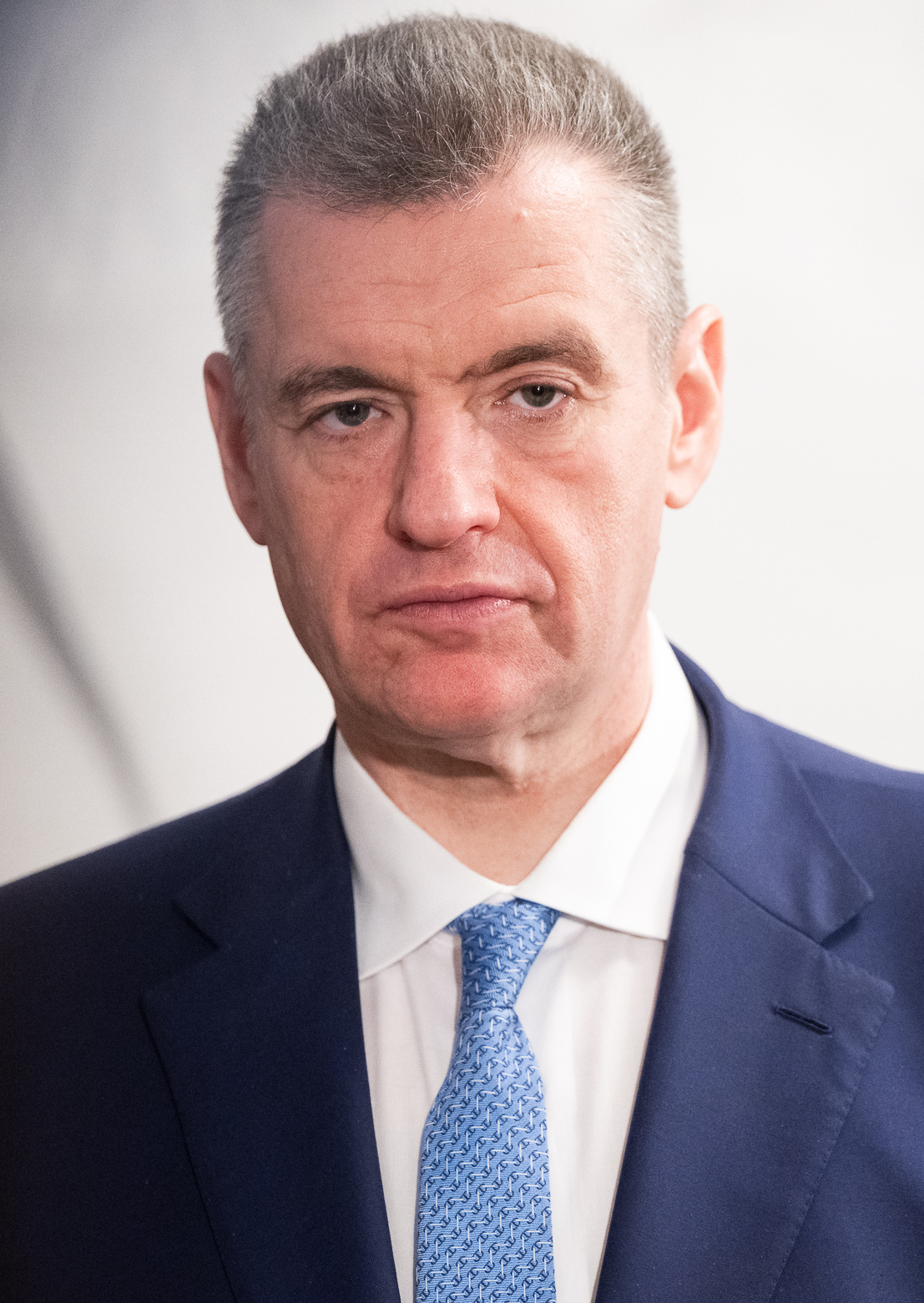
	Majority party	Minority party	Third party
Candidate	Vasily Orlov	Roman Kobyzov	Leonid Slutsky
Party	United Russia	CPRF	LDPR
Last election	33.15%, 18 seats	21.48%, 3 seats	14.16%, 1 seat
Seats won	23	1	1
Seat change	▲5	▼2	Steady
Popular vote	192,976	45,054	31,715
Percentage	60.14%	14.04%	9.88%
Swing	▲26.99 pp	▼7.44 pp	▼4.28 pp
	Fourth party	Fifth party	Sixth party
	NL	SR	CPCR
Candidate	Roman Sanzharevsky	Kirill Zimin	Sergey Rafalsky
Party	New People	A Just Russia	Communists of Russia
Last election	7.18%, 1 seat	6.28%, 1 seat	8.26%, 1 seat
Seats won	1	1	0
Seat change	Steady	Steady	▼1
Popular vote	21,451	16,404	5,570
Percentage	6.69%	5.11%	1.74%
Swing	▼0.49 pp	▼1.17 pp	▼6.52 pp
Chairman before election
Konstantin Dyakonov
United Russia
Elected Chairman
Yekaterina Snezhko
United Russia
Senator before election
Artem Sheikin
United Russia
Senator after election
Artem Sheikin
United Russia

The 2026 Legislative Assembly of Amur Oblast election took place on 18–20 September 2026, on common election day, coinciding with the 2026 Russian legislative election. All 27 seats in the Legislative Assembly were up for re-election.

United Russia almost doubled its vote share, winning 60.1% of the vote and all 18 single-mandate constituencies. All other parties saw their votes drop with Communist Party of the Russian Federation losing two out of its three seats, while Communists of Russia failed to cross the 5% threshold and retain its faction in the Legislative Assembly.

== Electoral system ==
Under current election laws, the Legislative Assembly is elected for a term of five years, with parallel voting. 9 seats are elected by party-list proportional representation with a 5% electoral threshold, with the other part elected in 18 single-member constituencies by first-past-the-post voting. Seats in the proportional part are allocated using the Imperiali quota, modified to ensure that every party list, which passes the threshold, receives at least one mandate.

== Candidates ==
=== Party lists ===
To register regional lists of candidates, parties need to collect 0.5% of signatures of all registered voters in Amur Oblast.

The following parties were relieved from the necessity to collect signatures:

- United Russia
- Communist Party of the Russian Federation
- Liberal Democratic Party of Russia
- A Just Russia
- New People
- Communists of Russia
- Russian Party of Pensioners for Social Justice

№	Party	Party-list leaders	Candidates	Status
1	United Russia	Vasily Orlov • Vyacheslav Loginov • Tatyana Polovaykina • Artem Sheikin • Yekaterina Snezhko	18	Registered
2	New People	Roman Sanzharevsky • Vladislav Malinovsky • Larisa Nikolenko • Sergey Kozanenko • Natalya Kucher	18	Registered
3	A Just Russia	Kirill Zimin • Yevgeny Zavgorodniy • Igor Maryin • Vasily Glazov • Aleksandr Bichenko	12	Registered
4	Communist Party	Roman Kobyzov • Olga Lazarenko • Andrey Miroshin • Dmitry Syrtsov • Biarslan Nurmagomedov	12	Registered
5	Communists of Russia	Sergey Rafalsky • Gennady Gamza • ~~Igor Gladyshev~~ • Aleksey Smirnov • Semyon Orlov	15	Registered
6	Liberal Democratic Party	Leonid Slutsky • Mikhail Zotov • Natalya Mikhaylova • Vitaly Chernogor • Dmitry Nazarov	17	Registered

Russian Party of Pensioners for Social Justice, which won one party-list seat in the last election, decided not to contest this election.

=== Single-mandate constituencies ===
18 single-mandate constituencies were formed in Amur Oblast. To register candidates in single-mandate constituencies need to collect 3% of signatures of registered voters in the constituency.

Number of candidates in single-mandate constituencies
Party	Candidates	
Party	Nominated	Registered
United Russia	18	18
Communist Party	18	18
Liberal Democratic Party	17	16
Communists of Russia	3	2
New People	18	18
A Just Russia	16	15
Total	90	87

== Results ==
=== Results by party lists ===
Summary of the 18–20 September 2026 Legislative Assembly of Amur Oblast election results
Party	Party list					Constituency		Total	
Party	Votes	%	±pp	Seats	+/–	Seats	+/–	Seats	+/–
United Russia	192,976	60.14	▲26.99	5	▲3	18	▲2	23	▲5
Communist Party	45,054	14.04	▼7.44	1	▼1	0	▼1	1	▼2
Liberal Democratic Party	31,715	9.88	▼4.28	1	Steady	0	Steady	1	Steady
New People	21,451	6.69	▼0.49	1	Steady	0	Steady	1	Steady
A Just Russia	16,404	5.11	▼1.17	1	Steady	0	Steady	1	Steady
Communists of Russia	5,570	1.74	▼6.52	0	▼1	0	Steady	0	▼1
Invalid ballots	7,710	2.40	▼1.67	—	—	—	—	—	—
Total	320,880	100.00	—	9	Steady	18	Steady	27	Steady
Turnout	320,880	54.53	▲13.91	—	—	—	—	—	—
Registered voters	588,442	100.00	—	—	—	—	—	—	—

Deputy Chief of Staff to the Governor of Amur Oblast Yekaterina Snezhko (United Russia) was elected Chairwoman of the Legislative Assembly, replacing outgoing Chairman Konstantin Dyakonov (United Russia). Incumbent Senator Artem Sheikin (United Russia) was re-appointed to the Federation Council.

=== Results in single-member constituencies ===
==== District 1 ====
Summary of the 18–20 September 2026 Legislative Assembly of Amur Oblast election in Bureysky constituency No.1
Candidate	Party	Votes	%
Aleksandr Rusyayev (incumbent)	United Russia	8,263	54.98%
Ivan Adamenko	Communist Party	2,994	19.92%
Polina Butorina	Liberal Democratic Party	1,563	10.40%
Marina Solyanik	New People	929	6.18%
Yevgeny Ayvazyan	A Just Russia	681	4.53%
Total		15,030	100%

==== District 2 ====
Summary of the 18–20 September 2026 Legislative Assembly of Amur Oblast election in Raychikhinsky constituency No.2
Candidate	Party	Votes	%
Dmitry Chayka (incumbent)	United Russia	4,805	46.98%
Aleksandr Poyenko	Communist Party	1,792	17.52%
Aleksandr Bichenko	A Just Russia	1,513	14.79%
Nikolay Gribov	New People	849	8.30%
Aleksandr Trumen	Liberal Democratic Party	713	6.97%
Total		10,228	100%

==== District 3 ====
Summary of the 18–20 September 2026 Legislative Assembly of Amur Oblast election in Konstantinovsky constituency No.3
Candidate	Party	Votes	%
Mikhail Loginov (incumbent)	United Russia	7,085	54.10%
Olga Lazarenko	Communist Party	2,721	20.78%
Sergey Yesaulkov	Liberal Democratic Party	1,525	11.65%
Pyotr Ulchenko	New People	1,058	8.08%
Total		13,095	100%

==== District 4 ====
Summary of the 18–20 September 2026 Legislative Assembly of Amur Oblast election in Blagoveshensko-Ivanovsky constituency No.4
Candidate	Party	Votes	%
Yevgeny Kositsyn (incumbent)	United Russia	12,900	60.79%
Olesya Ostapenko	Communist Party	2,617	12.33%
Andrey Yevdokimov	Liberal Democratic Party	2,157	10.16%
Ivan Bykov	A Just Russia	1,658	7.81%
Larisa Nikolenko	New People	1,256	5.92%
Total		21,221	100%

==== District 5 ====
Summary of the 18–20 September 2026 Legislative Assembly of Amur Oblast election in Oktyabrsko-Tambovsky constituency No.5
Candidate	Party	Votes	%
Yury Burdilovsky (incumbent)	United Russia	8,532	57.60%
Fyodor Zhukov	Communist Party	2,360	15.93%
Mikhail Zotov	Liberal Democratic Party	1,883	12.71%
Anastasia Dubovets	New People	1,485	10.02%
Total		14,813	100%

==== District 6 ====
Summary of the 18–20 September 2026 Legislative Assembly of Amur Oblast election in Blagoveshensk-Eastern constituency No.6
Candidate	Party	Votes	%
Anatoly Fesenko (incumbent)	United Russia	9,178	57.60%
Ruslan Bashmakov	Communist Party	2,196	13.78%
Natalya Kucher	New People	1,787	11.21%
Anton Marinenko	Liberal Democratic Party	1,195	7.50%
Pavel Redozubov	A Just Russia	1,114	6.99%
Total		15,935	100%

==== District 7 ====
Summary of the 18–20 September 2026 Legislative Assembly of Amur Oblast election in Blagoveshensk-Central constituency No.7
Candidate	Party	Votes	%
Yevgeny Tyukhayev (incumbent)	United Russia	8,277	49.40%
Aleksandr Gubenko	Communist Party	2,351	14.03%
Yevgeny Zavgorodniy	A Just Russia	1,735	10.35%
Vladislav Malinovsky	New People	1,733	10.34%
Sergey Koval	Liberal Democratic Party	1,287	7.68%
Nikolay Golota	Communists of Russia	795	4.74%
Total		16,756	100%

==== District 8 ====
Summary of the 18–20 September 2026 Legislative Assembly of Amur Oblast election in Blagoveshensk-Western constituency No.8
Candidate	Party	Votes	%
Vladimir Semyonov	United Russia	13,500	60.87%
Maksim Patrin	Communist Party	3,460	15.60%
Vasily Glazov	A Just Russia	2,467	11.12%
Stepan Shmakov	New People	2,181	9.83%
Total		22,177	100%

==== District 9 ====
Summary of the 18–20 September 2026 Legislative Assembly of Amur Oblast election in Blagoveshensk-Pogranichny constituency No.9
Candidate	Party	Votes	%
Andrey Domashenkin (incumbent)	United Russia	10,128	53.44%
Pavel Sonin	Communist Party	2,616	13.80%
Yulia Zamchevskaya	A Just Russia	2,023	10.67%
Artyom Brukhtiy	Liberal Democratic Party	1,916	10.11%
Sergey Kozanenko	New People	1,692	8.93%
Total		18,953	100%

==== District 10 ====
Summary of the 18–20 September 2026 Legislative Assembly of Amur Oblast election in Blagoveshensk-Northern constituency No.10
Candidate	Party	Votes	%
Arkady Maltsev	United Russia	10,097	60.75%
Maria Lizander	Communist Party	2,257	13.58%
Aleksandr Bykovsky	Liberal Democratic Party	1,644	9.89%
Pavel Dubovets	New People	1,204	7.24%
Anna Ginda	A Just Russia	953	5.73%
Total		16,621	100%

==== District 11 ====
Summary of the 18–20 September 2026 Legislative Assembly of Amur Oblast election in Belogorsk constituency No.11
Candidate	Party	Votes	%
Pavel Zarkov	United Russia	7,982	51.03%
Svetlana Trembach	Communist Party	2,226	14.23%
Olga Belousova	New People	1,720	11.00%
Ruslan Gorbuntsov	A Just Russia	1,679	10.73%
Gennady Popov	Liberal Democratic Party	1,554	9.93%
Total		15,642	100%

==== District 12 ====
Summary of the 18–20 September 2026 Legislative Assembly of Amur Oblast election in Belogorsky constituency No.12
Candidate	Party	Votes	%
Aleksandr Sarapkin	United Russia	9,610	55.27%
Yevgeny Gorshkov	Communist Party	3,504	20.15%
Tatyana Pilinskaya	A Just Russia	2,154	12.39%
Sergey Shirin	New People	1,594	9.17%
Total		17,386	100%

==== District 13 ====
Summary of the 18–20 September 2026 Legislative Assembly of Amur Oblast election in Svobodny constituency No.13
Candidate	Party	Votes	%
Andrey Belousov	United Russia	10,163	56.64%
Andrey Miroshin	Communist Party	2,863	15.96%
Andrey Burdelyov	Liberal Democratic Party	1,718	9.57%
Ruslan Sidorov	New People	1,009	5.62%
Konstantin Yakovlev	Communists of Russia	777	4.33%
Aleksey Safronenko	A Just Russia	732	4.08%
Total		17,944	100%

==== District 14 ====
Summary of the 18–20 September 2026 Legislative Assembly of Amur Oblast election in Svobodnensky constituency No.14
Candidate	Party	Votes	%
Konstantin Zinovenko (incumbent)	United Russia	7,303	45.55%
Dmitry Nazarov	Liberal Democratic Party	2,669	16.65%
Artyom Tokach	Communist Party	2,036	12.70%
Aleksandr Degasyuk	A Just Russia	1,978	12.34%
Matvey Monashov	New People	1,368	8.53%
Total		16,032	100%

==== District 15 ====
Summary of the 18–20 September 2026 Legislative Assembly of Amur Oblast election in Shimanovsky constituency No.15
Candidate	Party	Votes	%
Ulyana Levanova (incumbent)	United Russia	8,444	51.33%
Olga Petaychuk	Communist Party	2,877	17.49%
Dmitry Kovinsky	Liberal Democratic Party	1,579	9.60%
Anastasia Ayusheva	A Just Russia	1,514	9.20%
Yelena Mikhaylova	New People	1,299	7.90%
Total		16,451	100%

==== District 16 ====
Summary of the 18–20 September 2026 Legislative Assembly of Amur Oblast election in Skovorodinsko-Magdagachinsky constituency No.16
Candidate	Party	Votes	%
Vyacheslav Sirgiyenko	United Russia	10,599	61.12%
Dmitry Syrtsov (incumbent)	Communist Party	3,031	17.48%
Maksim Namakonov	Liberal Democratic Party	1,846	10.65%
Miroslav Syomushkin	New People	1,155	6.66%
Total		17,341	100%

==== District 17 ====
Summary of the 18–20 September 2026 Legislative Assembly of Amur Oblast election in Zeysky constituency No.17
Candidate	Party	Votes	%
Dmitry Aleksandrov	United Russia	11,977	68.47%
Vitaly Chernogor	Liberal Democratic Party	1,830	10.46%
Zhanna Kozina	Communist Party	1,486	8.49%
Darya Makarova	New People	874	5.00%
Denis Babushkin	A Just Russia	840	4.80%
Total		17,493	100%

==== District 18 ====
Summary of the 18–20 September 2026 Legislative Assembly of Amur Oblast election in Tyndinsky constituency No.18
Candidate	Party	Votes	%
Fyodor Sidorov (incumbent)	United Russia	10,667	61.56%
Igor Magarlamov	Communist Party	2,177	12.56%
Stepan Guritsenko	A Just Russia	1,508	8.70%
Yury Shatalov	Liberal Democratic Party	1,454	8.39%
Maksim Yagodko	New People	1,109	6.40%
Total		17,328	100%

=== Members ===
Incumbent deputies are highlighted with bold, elected members who declined to take a seat are marked with ~~strikethrough~~.

Constituency
No.	Member	Party
1	Aleksandr Rusyayev	United Russia
2	Dmitry Chayka	United Russia
3	Mikhail Loginov	United Russia
4	Yevgeny Kositsyn	United Russia
5	Yury Burdilovsky	United Russia
6	Anatoly Fesenko	United Russia
7	Yevgeny Tyukhayev	United Russia
8	Vladimir Semyonov	United Russia
9	Andrey Domashenkin	United Russia
10	Arkady Maltsev	United Russia
11	Pavel Zarkov	United Russia
12	Aleksandr Sarapkin	United Russia
13	Andrey Belousov	United Russia
14	Konstantin Zinovenko	United Russia
15	Ulyana Levanova	United Russia
16	Vyacheslav Sirgiyenko	United Russia
17	Dmitry Aleksandrov	United Russia
18	Fyodor Sidorov	United Russia

Party lists
Member	Party
~~Vasily Orlov~~	United Russia
~~Vyacheslav Loginov~~	United Russia
Tatyana Polovaykina	United Russia
Artem Sheikin	United Russia
Yekaterina Snezhko	United Russia
Sergey Bogidayev	United Russia
Valentina Kalita	United Russia
Roman Kobyzov	Communist Party
~~Leonid Slutsky~~	Liberal Democratic Party
Mikhail Zotov	Liberal Democratic Party
Roman Sanzharevsky	New People
Kirill Zimin	A Just Russia

== See also ==
- 2026 Russian regional elections
