= Artem Sheikin =

Russian politician (born 1980)

- Артём Шейкин
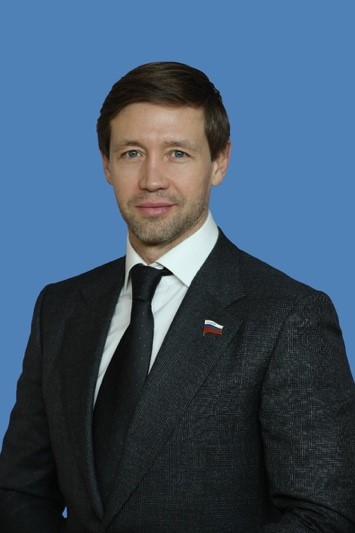

Senator from Amur Oblast
- Incumbent
- Assumed office 28 September 2021
- Preceded by: Alexander Koryakov

Personal details
- Born: Artem Sheikin; 25 March 1980 (age 46) Belogorsk, Amur Oblast, Stavropol Krai, Soviet Union
- Party: United Russia
- Education: Blagoveshchensk State Pedagogical University

Artem Gennadyevich Sheikin (Russian: Артём Геннадьевич Шейкин; born 25 March 1980) is a Russian politician serving as a senator from Amur Oblast since 28 September 2021.

== Biography ==
Artem Sheikin was born on 25 March 1980 in Belogorsk, Amur Oblast. In 2001, he graduated from the Blagoveshchensk State Pedagogical University. From 2001 to 2003 he was engaged in business activities. Later he worked as a docent at the Saint Petersburg State University of Economics. In February 2020, he was appointed advisor to the Governor of Amur Oblast. In September 2021, Sheikin became the senator from the Legislative Assembly of Amur Oblast.

Sheikin is under personal sanctions introduced by the European Union, the United Kingdom, the United States of America, Canada, Switzerland, Australia, Ukraine, and New Zealand for ratifying the decisions of the treaty between Russia and the Donetsk and Luhansk republics and providing political and economic support for Russia's annexation of Ukrainian territories.
