= Vladimir Dyachenko =

Russian researcher and politician (1948–2024)

- Владимир Дьяченко

Head of Administration of Amur Oblast
- In office 3 December 1994 – 17 May 1996
- Preceded by: Vladimir Polevanov
- Succeeded by: Yuriy Lyashko

Member of the Federation Council of Russia for Amur Oblast
- In office 23 January 1996 – 17 May 1996
- Preceded by: Leonid Korotkov; Pavel Stein
- Succeeded by: Yuriy Lyashko

Personal details
- Born: Vladimir Nikolayevich Dyachenko; 24 October 1948 Blagoveshchensk, Russian SFSR, USSR
- Died: 2 March 2024 (aged 75)
- Party: CPSU (until 1991); Independent (since 1991)
- Education: Blagoveshchensk State Pedagogical University
- Occupation: Researcher

Vladimir Nikolayevich Dyachenko (Russian: Владимир Николаевич Дьяче́нко; 24 October 1948 – 2 March 2024) was a Russian researcher and politician. An independent, he served as Head of Administration of Amur Oblast from 1994 to 1996 and served on the Federation Council from January to May 1996.

Dyachenko died on 2 March 2024, at the age of 75.
