= Novinka =

Novinka (Russian: Новинка) is the name of several rural localities in Russia:

- Novinka, Amur Oblast, a selo in Novopetrovsky Selsoviet of Blagoveshchensky District, Amur Oblast
- Novinka, Astrakhan Oblast, a selo in Novinsky Selsoviet of Volodarsky District, Astrakhan Oblast
- Novinka, Vologda Oblast, settlement in Vytegorsky District, Vologda Oblast

Others

- Novinka, an imprint of Nova Publishers
