= Albert Krivchenko =

Russian politician (1935–2021)

- Альберт Кривченко

1st Governor of Amur Oblast
- In office 8 October 1991 – 11 April 1993
- Succeeded by: Aleksandr Surat

Personal details
- Born: Albert Arkadyevich Krivchenko; 22 December 1935 Komsomolsk-on-Amur, Russian SFSR, Soviet Union
- Died: 31 May 2021 (aged 85) Novinka, Russia

Albert Arkadyevich Krivchenko (Russian: Альберт Аркадьевич Кривченко; 22 December 1935 – 31 May 2021) was a Russian political figure who served as the 1st Governor of Amur Oblast.

== Biography ==
Albert Krivchenko was born on 22 December 1935.

He worked as a journalist, and worked as a TASS correspondent in the Amur Oblast.

He was a member of the Communist Party of the Soviet Union until January 1991. From 1990 to 1993, he was a member of the Congress of People's Deputies of Russia, and worked as a member of the Supreme Council Committee on the media, in relations with public organizations and movements, and the study of public opinion.

On 8 October 1991, he became the 1st Governor of Amur Oblast. In April 1993, he ran for election of the head of the regional administration, but lost, gaining 5.7% of the votes and taking the fourth place.

He was a member of the movement "Democratic Russia", was a member of its regional coordinating council. From 1994, he was the chairman of the Political Council of the Amur regional organization of the Democratic Choice of Russia.

After his political career, Krivchenko lived in the Amur village of Novinka.
