= Aleh Chakunkov =

Belarusian diplomat

- Алег Чакункоў

Ambassador of Belarus to Vietnam
- In office 4 February 1998 – 14 September 2001
- Succeeded by: Alyaksandr Kucalaj

Ambassador of Belarus to Thailand (part-time)
- In office 6 October 1999 – 14 September 2001

Ambassador of Belarus to Laos (part-time)
- In office 6 October 1999 – 14 September 2001

Deputy Minister of Foreign Economic Relations
- In office 14 July 1997 – 4 February 1998

Personal details
- Born: Aleh Fyodaravich Chakunkov; 28 July 1958 (age 68) Potsdam, East Germany

Aleh Fyodaravich Chakunkov (Belarusian: Алег Фёдаравіч Чакункоў; Russian: Олег Фёдорович Чекунков), is a Belarusian diplomat who had served as an ambassador to Vietnam from 1998 to 2001.

== Biography ==
Aleh Chakunkov was born in Potsdam, East Germany on 28 July 1958.

In 1980 he graduated from the Minsk State Pedagogical Institute of Foreign Languages.

In 1980 to 1983, he served in the Soviet army. Then, from 1983 to 1984, he worked as an engineer of the main postal department of the Ministry of Communications of the BSSR, from 1984 to 1988 he was the head of the international section of the Minsk Post Office.

In 1991, he graduated from the All-Union Academy of Foreign Trade in Moscow.

He became a chief specialist of the State Committee for External Economic Relations of Belarus from 1991 to 1993.

On 14 July 1994, he was appointed the trade representative of the Belarus in Vietnam.

He then became the Head of the Regional Cooperation Department of the Ministry of Foreign Economic Relations of Belarus in 1996.

On 14 July 1997, Chakunkov was appointed Deputy Minister of Foreign Economic Relations of the Belarus.

On 4 February 1998, Chakunkov was appointed Ambassador of Belarus to Vietnam.

On 6 October 1999, he became an additional ambassador to Laos and Thailand on a part-time basis.

He was dismissed from all these positions on 14 September 2001.

== Family ==
He is married.

He has two sons, including, Aleksey, who is the Minister for the Development of the Russian Far East and Arctic.

He speaks English, French and German.
