= Alyaksandr Kucalaj =

Belarusian diplomat

- Аляксандр Куцалай

Ambassador of Belarus to Vietnam
- In office 19 February 2004 – 3 September 2010
- Preceded by: Aleh Chakunkov
- Succeeded by: Valery Sadoha

Personal details
- Born: Alyaksandr Alyaksandravich Kucalaj; 28 August 1957 (age 69) Minsk, Soviet Union

Alyaksandr Alyaksandravich Kucalaj (Berlarusian: Аляксандр Аляксандравіч Куцалай; Russian: Александр Александрович Куцелай; born on 28 August 1957), is a Belarusian diplomat and who had served as an ambassador of Belarus to Vietnam from 2004 to 2010.

== Biography ==
Alyaksandr Kucalaj was born in Minsk on 28 August 1957.

From 1976 to 1978, Kucalaj served in the Soviet Army, at the Trans-Baikal Military District.

Between 1982 and 1991, he was an electrician, foreman, senior foreman, and head of the section of the Minsk Assembly Directorate of the Belelectromontazh special trust.

In 1984, he graduated from the Minsk Radio Engineering Institute.

From 1991 to 1992, he studied at the Academy of National Economy under the Government of Russia. In 1992, he graduated from the Academy of National Economy under the Government of Russia. He speaks Spanish and English. The same year, he was a student at the International School of Business (IBM), in Tokyo.

From 1992 to 1993, he was the head of the commercial center of the Belelectromontazh special trust.

From 1993 to 1994, he was the chief specialist of the non-tariff regulation department of the State Committee of Belarus for Foreign Economic Relations.

From 1994 to 1997, he worked in various positions in the Ministry of Foreign Economic Relations, as he had been the Head of the Export Control Department, the deputy Head of the department, and then, the head of the Foreign Trade Regulation Department of the Ministry of Foreign Economic Relations of Belarus.

From 1997 to 2001, he was the trade representative of Belarus in Mongolia.

From 2001 to 2004, he was the Head of the Department of Foreign Trade, and Director of the Department of Coordination of Foreign Economic Activities of the Ministry of Foreign Affairs of Belarus.

On 19 February 2004, Kucalaj was appointed Ambassador of Belarus to Vietnam. He was dismissed from this position on 3 September 2010.

On 21 February 2011, in accordance with the Decree of the President of Belarus, he was awarded the Order of Honor.
