= Far Eastern Higher Combined Arms Command School =

Military academy of the Russian Armed Forces

Marshal of the Soviet Union K. K. Rokossovsky Far Eastern Higher Combined Arms Command School
- Дальневосточное высшее общевойсковое командное училище имени Маршала Советского Союза К. К. Рокоссовского
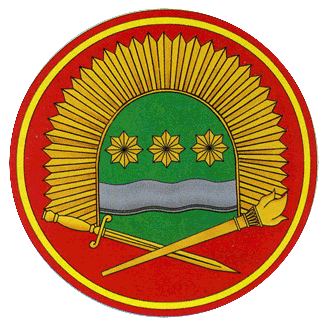
- Type: Military academy
- Established: 11 February 1940
- Principal: General-Major Vladimir Gryzlov
- Location: 158 Lenin Street, Blagoveshchensk, Amur Oblast, Russia; 50°15′32″N 127°30′32″E

The Marshal of the Soviet Union K. K. Rokossovsky Far Eastern Higher Combined Arms Command School (Note: Russian: Дальневосточное высшее общевойсковое командное училище имени Маршала Советского Союза К. К. Рокоссовского, romanized: Dalnevostochnoye vyssheye obshchevoyskovoye komandnoye uchilishche imeni Marshala Sovetskogo Soyuza K. K. Rokossovskogo), also known by its abbreviation DVOKU (Russian: ДВОКУ), is a military academy of the Russian Armed Forces.

Established on 11 February 1940 as the Vladivostok Infantry School, the Far Eastern Higher Combined Arms Command School is one of the oldest military educational establishments in Russia. Opening shortly before the Axis invasion of the Soviet Union, it went on to train infantry company and platoon commanders during the war. Graduates saw action in many of the military theatres during the war, many of them receiving awards and honours for their service. The school continued to train officers after the war, relocating from Vladivostok to Blagoveshchensk in 1949, and undergoing several changes of name in the following years. It received several awards from the Soviet and later Russian governments, and has trained some 26,000 graduates who have served in many warzones across the world, have received honours including the titles Hero of the Soviet Union and Hero of the Russian Federation, and attained high military ranks.

Today the school trains officers for service with the Armed Forces' motor rifle units, and with the Naval Infantry. It has particular specialisations in mountain and arctic warfare, and is the only military university in Russia to offer these.

== History ==
The school is one of the oldest military educational institutions in the country, dating from 11 February 1940 with its founding as the Vladivostok Infantry School under the orders of Peoples' Commissar of Defence Kliment Voroshilov. Its first head was Colonel Ivan Chistyakov, then assistant commander of the 39th Rifle Corps. The first class of 790 students graduated on 16 June 1941, a month before the Axis invasion of the Soviet Union. To meet the demands of the war, on 16 December 1941 the school initiated its two-month advanced training courses for infantry company and platoon commanders. The school's students and graduates went on to take part in a number of the battles during the war, with around 2,000 graduates serving at the defence of Moscow and the subsequent counterattacks. In 1942 two cadet rifle brigades (the 248th and 250th) were formed from officers, cadets and soldiers of the school, and were deployed to the Steppe and Leningrad Fronts. After sustaining heavy losses during fighting in 1943, the brigades were reorganized into rifle divisions and served throughout the war. In total the school trained 6,615 officers, 2,889 in 1942 alone. 23 officer graduates of the school received the title of Hero of the Soviet Union during the war, with several thousand receiving some form of order or decoration. On 11 February 1944 the school was awarded the Order of the Red Banner and the diploma of the Presidium of the Supreme Soviet.

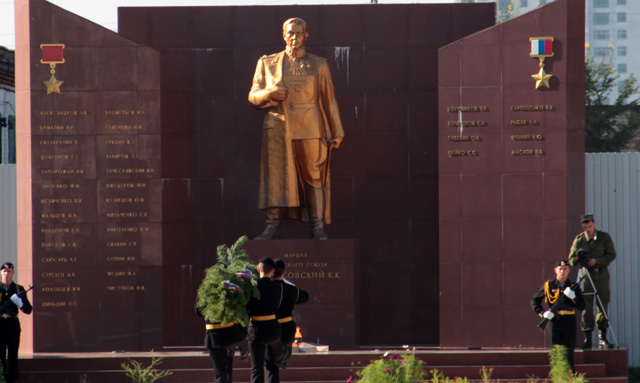
Memorial on the school's grounds to its namesake Marshal Konstantin Rokossovsky. The memorial also lists graduates of the school who received the title of Hero of the Soviet Union or Hero of the Russian Federation.

The school continued in existence after the war, and in September 1949 was relocated from Vladivostok to Blagoveshchensk, becoming the Blagoveshchensk Infantry School. It was again renamed on 1 August 1958, becoming the Far Eastern Higher Combined Arms Command School. On 16 January 1965 it was awarded a parade banner by the Military Council of the Far Eastern Military District. As part of the 1967 celebrations of the October Revolution, the school was awarded the Memorial Banner of the Central Committee of the Communist Party. On 13 January 1969 the school was named after Marshal of the Soviet Union Konstantin Rokossovsky. In April 1970, the school was awarded the Jubilee Medal "In Commemoration of the 100th Anniversary of the Birth of Vladimir Ilyich Lenin", and in December 1972 the Jubilee Badge of Honour of the 50th Anniversary of the Founding of the USSR.

On 16 September 1998 the school was named the Far Eastern Military Institute by order No. 417 of the Ministry of Defence of the Russian Federation, though on 9 July 2004 it was again renamed, this time to the K. K. Rokossovsky Far Eastern Higher Military Command School (Military Institute). On 24 December 2008 it became part of the All-Russian Research Centre for the Military Aviation of the Armed Forces of the Russian Federation, though it was again separated on 28 April 2015 and placed under the direct control of the Ministry of Defence. On 5 May 2014, the Commander-in-Chief of the Ground Forces, Oleg Salyukov, presented the school with a new battle standard. On 22 October 2019 the school was awarded the Order of Zhukov by President Vladimir Putin.

On 11 February 2020 the school will mark its 80th anniversary.

== Work ==
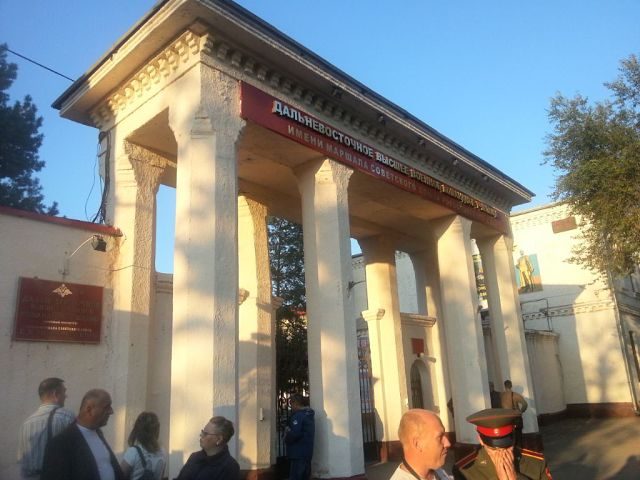
The entrance gates of the Far Eastern Higher Combined Arms Command School

The school trains officers for service with the Armed Forces' motor rifle units, and with the Naval Infantry. Specialisations offered by the school include mountain warfare training, to provide officers for the mountain brigades. In 2013 the school introduced an Arctic warfare specialisation, and since 2010 it has provided secondary vocational education for warrant officers. In 2016 there were 11 doctors of sciences, 73 candidates of sciences, and 78 associate professors working at the school.

Cadets and staff of the naval infantry training units have taken part in long-distance voyages aboard Russian warships in European, South Korean and Middle Eastern waters. Those training with Arctic specialisations have deployed with the 200th Separate Motor Rifle Brigade and the 61st Naval Infantry Brigade, part of the Northern Fleet Joint Strategic Command. Arctic training has also taken part alongside the exercises of the Northern Fleet. Mountain warfare officers undertake training at facilities in Russia's mountain regions, and also carry out visits to similar regions in India, Germany and Switzerland. The school is the only military university in Russia that trains officers in the specialty "commanders of motorized rifle platoons (arctic)."

== Facilities ==
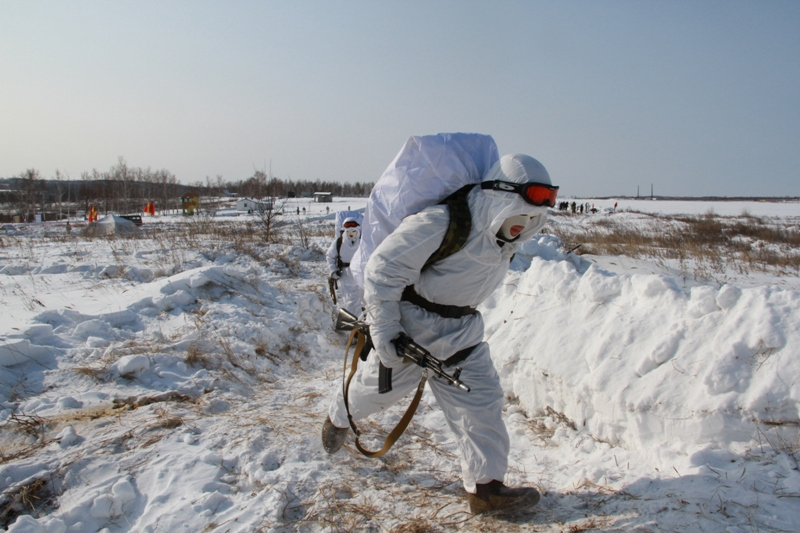
Cadets carrying out Arctic training

The school has extensive training and educational facilities, including gyms, libraries, collections of specialised military equipment, simulators and assault courses. There is a field training base, special ice training courses, canteens, classrooms and lecture theatres, and a recreation club. The Amur Military Patriotic Park "Patriot" is located on the grounds of the school's training facilities. The school also houses a museum of military history, founded in 1976. It consists of four exhibition halls detailing the development of the school and its graduates.

== Teaching structure ==
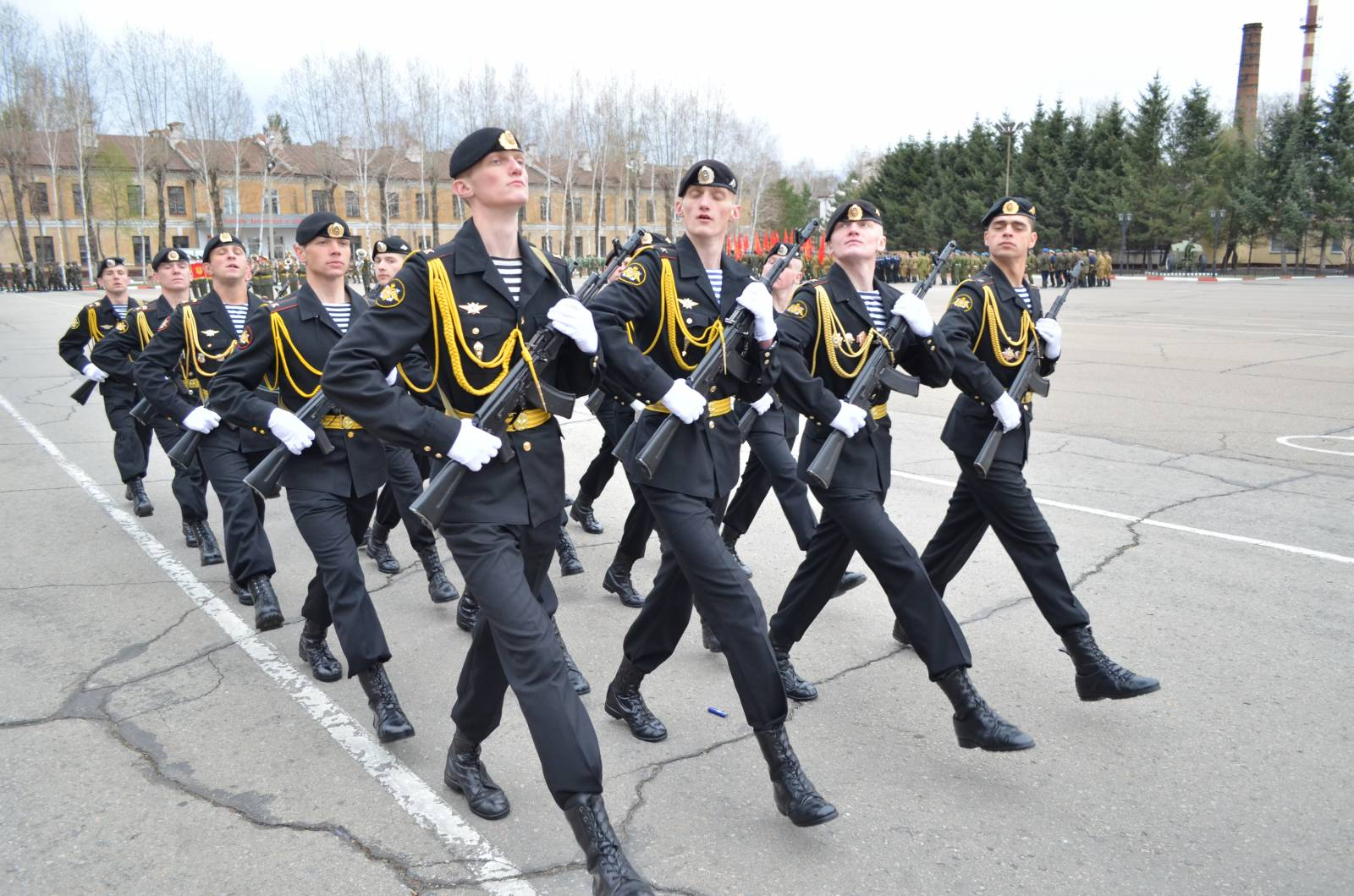
Naval infantry cadets parade on the school grounds

The school originated as a centre for training command personnel in a short period of time, achieved by reducing the number of subjects taught, and lengthening the teaching day from ten hours to twelve. With the demands of the Second World War, from 16 December 1941 the school offered advanced two-month training courses for company commanders and platoon commanders. In 1956 the school switched to solely training rifle platoon commanders. From the beginning of the 1968–1969 academic year the school began teaching higher engineering classes, and since 1994 it has taught a five-year "multipurpose tracked and wheeled vehicles" speciality. From 2002 onwards the school teaches four-year command management courses with the specialisations "Application of motorized infantry units", "Application of marine infantry units", and "Application of motorized infantry units (mountain)". Students graduate with the rank of lieutenant.

Since 2010 the school has also taught vocational education courses with secondary military special training to civilians in either "The use of motorized rifle (tank) units" or the "Maintenance and repair of motor vehicles". Foreign military specialists also attend the school for instruction in the specialties "The use of motorized rifle units", "The use of tank units", and "The use of military intelligence units." It has also carried out the professional retraining of demobilised servicemen.

== Band ==
The Band of the Far Eastern Higher Combined Arms Command School dates back to 1940 when it was created in Vladivostok. The band provides music for garrison military parades, swearing-in ceremonies, graduation ceremonies, evening roll call, wreath-laying ceremonies, and burial ceremonies. Its repertoire includes the national anthems at most 25 countries and is platoon-sized. Many musicians were sent to the front during the Second World War and received awards as a result. Musicians served with different units that spanned from those Prague to the troops of the 1st Far Eastern Front. In later years, musicians from this band were also recognized for their service in the Soviet-Afghan War and the First Chechen War. In May 2003, the band became the laureate of the First Regional Festival of amateur art among soldiers of the Russian Far East. It has also taken part in events such as The Amur Waves International Military Bands Festival.

== Graduates ==
Since the Second World War graduates of the school have served during the Sino-Soviet border conflict and Soviet–Afghan War and in Vietnam, Egypt, Syria, Laos, Cuba, the North Caucasus region, and South Ossetia. 37 graduates have been awarded the titles of Hero of the Soviet Union and Hero of the Russian Federation. Notable graduates include Major General Yuri Viktorovich Kuznetsov, awarded the Hero of the Soviet Union for his service in Afghanistan, who returned to become head of the school from March 1993 to November 2002. Over a hundred graduates have gone on to hold senior military ranks, including Army Generals Viktor Samsonov, Vladlen Mikhailov and Vladimir Bakin, and Colonel Generals Aleksandr Lvov and Valery Belyaev.

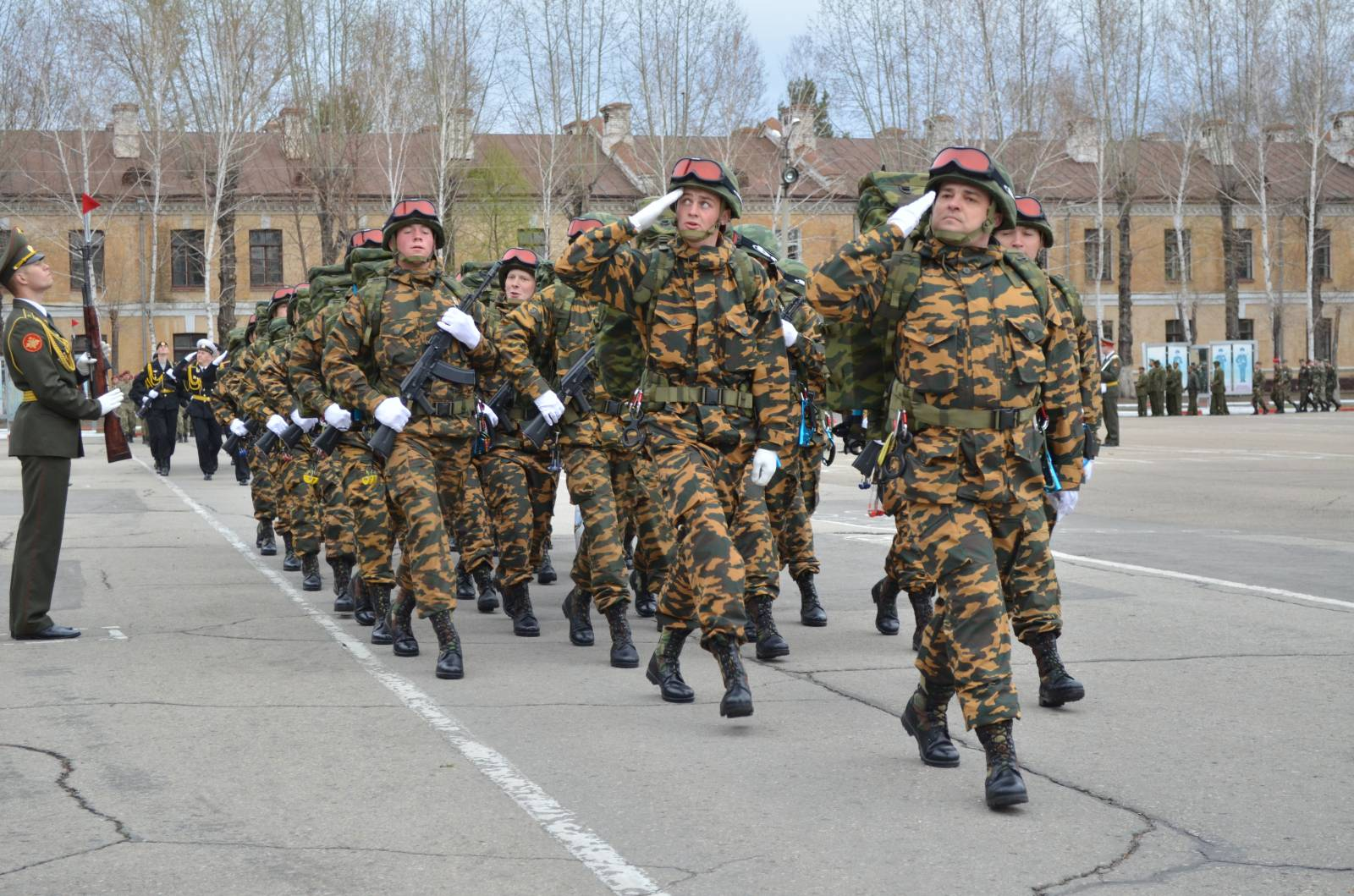
Members of the mountain troops on parade

From 1940 to 2016 26,437 officers graduated from the school in 104 graduations. Since its first award in 1961 279 graduates have been awarded the school's gold medal.

The school sends teams to compete in many of the all-Russian competitions, and in 2016 teams from the school won the "Suvorov Onslaught", "Sniper Frontier" and "Baltic Derby" competitions. In 2013 the school was recognized as the best military educational institution of the Russian Ground Forces, and was awarded the challenge cup of the Commander-in-Chief of the Russian Ground Forces. In 2014 and 2015 the school took second place. Staff and students are also involved in many of the military exercises carried out by the armed forces, and have participated in the "Zapad 2013" and Vostok 2014" exercises, as well as the joint Russian-Chinese "Peace Mission 2014", the Russian-Mongolian "Selenga 2015" and the Russian-Indian "Indra 2015". The school also liaises with local and regional government bodies in the area, particularly those of Amur Oblast and the city of Blagoveshchensk. Staff and students worked on relief efforts after the 2013 China–Russia floods in the region.

== Leadership ==
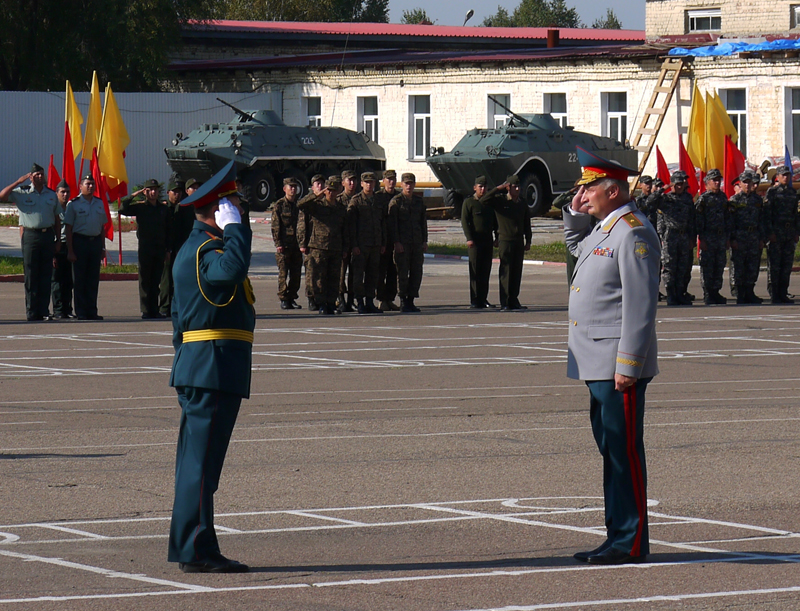
Head of the school Major General Vladimir Gryzlov (right) takes the salute on the school's parade ground.

=== Former heads ===
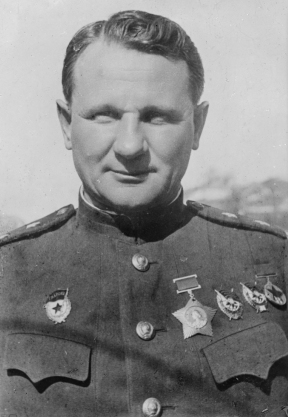
Ivan Chistyakov, a Hero of the Soviet Union, and first head of the school from 1940 to 1941.

- Colonel Ivan Chistyakov (1940-1941)
- Regimental Commissar Andrey Kryuchkov (1941-1944)
- Colonel Sergey Voroshilov (1944-1947)
- Major General Dmitry Tomilov (1947-1950)
- Major General Aleksey Pavlov (1950-1953)
- Major General Aleksandr Malchevsky (1953-1954)
- Major General Panteleimon Shioshvili (1954-1957)
- Major General Afanasy Bondarenko (1957-1959)
- Major General Sergey Savitsky (1959-1962)
- Major General Aleksey Chetverov (1962-1967)
- Major General Nikolai Baranov (1967-1976)
- Major General Efim Leonov (1976-1984)
- Major General Viktor Labushev (1984-1993)
- Major General Yuri Kuznetsov (1993-2002)
- Major General Vladimir Gryzlov (since 2002)

=== Deputies ===
- Colonel Sergei Galushka – First Deputy Head
- Colonel Vladimir Rukosluev – Deputy Head for educational and scientific work
- Colonel Fedor Burkov – Deputy Head for military-political work
- Colonel Igor Agafonov – Deputy Head for logistical support
