= Aleksandr Surat =

Russian politician (1947–2016)

- Александр Сурат

2nd Governor of Amur Oblast
- In office 11 May 1993 – 5 October 1993
- Preceded by: Albert Krivchenko
- Succeeded by: Vladimir Polevanov

Personal details
- Born: Aleksandr Vladimirovich Surat; 12 October 1947 Kharkov, Soviet Union
- Died: 2 September 2016 (aged 68) Gelendzhik, Russia

Aleksandr Vladimirovich Surat (Russian: Александр Владимирович Сурат; 12 October 1947 - 2 September 2016), was a Ukrainian-born Russian politician who had served as the 2nd Governor of Amur Oblast in 1993. He was the General Director of JSC "Amur Utility Systems" from 2003 to 2008.

== Biography ==
In April 1993, he was elected 2nd Governor (head) of the Amur Oblast. During the dissolution of the Supreme Soviet of Russia, he was supported by the Congress of People's Deputies of Russia, and on 5 October 1993, he was removed from his post, by the Decree of the President of the Russian Federation, after which he returned to the post of president of the Most company.

In 1997 to 2007, he was the General Director of JSC Amur Utility Systems. In the last years of his life, he headed the municipal enterprise in Gelendzhik of one of the districts of the resort city, where he died on 2 September 2016.
