= Aleksandr Galushka =

Russian politician

- Александр Галушка
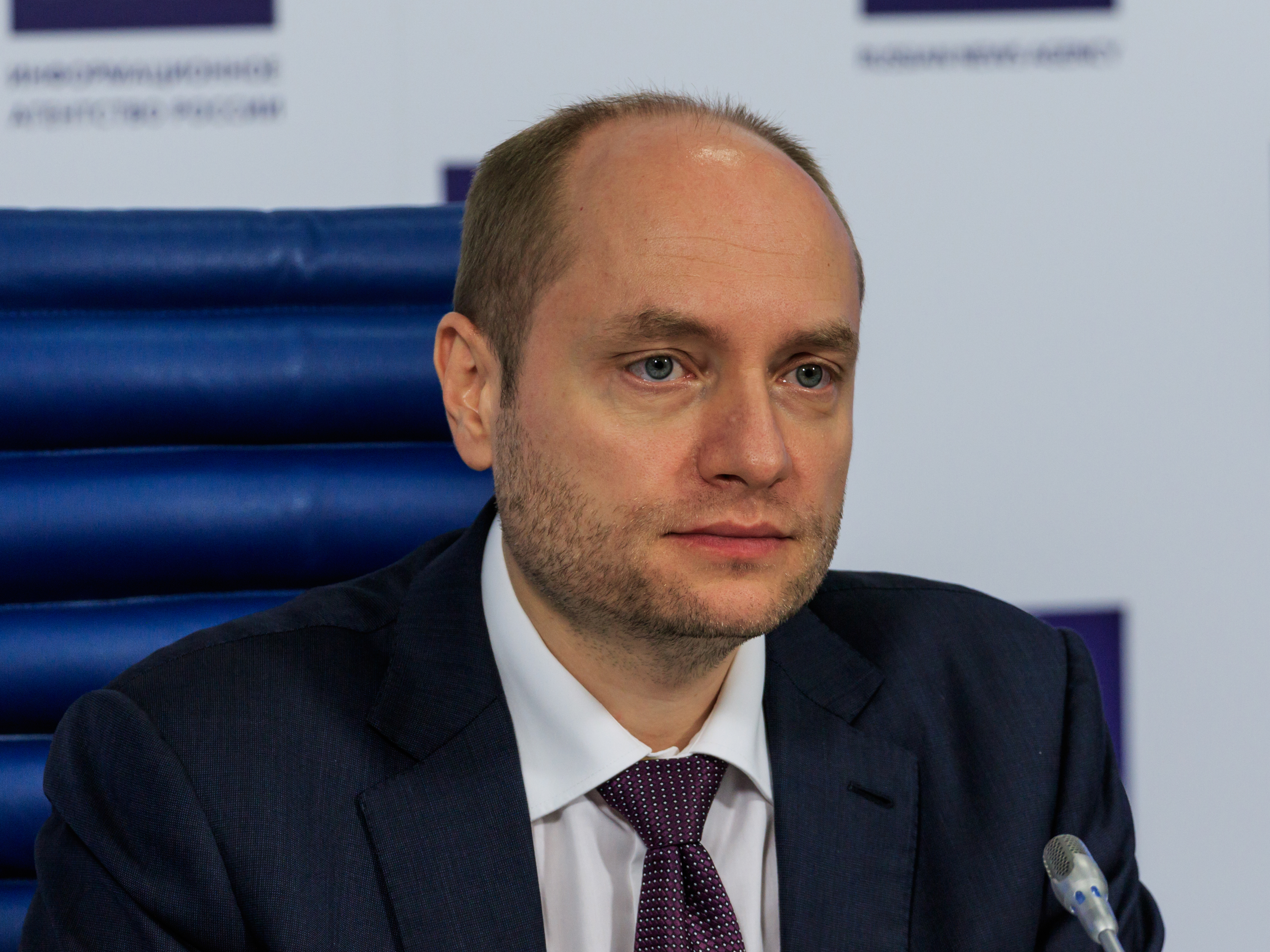
- Galushka in 2018

Minister for the Development of the Russian Far East
- In office 11 September 2013 – 7 May 2018
- Prime Minister: Dmitry Medvedev
- Preceded by: Viktor Ishayev
- Succeeded by: Alexander Kozlov

Personal details
- Born: 1 December 1975 (age 50) Klin, USSR
- Education: Russian State Social University

Aleksandr Sergeyevich Galushka (Russian: Александр Сергеевич Галушка; born 1 December 1975) is a Russian politician, co-chairman of Business Russia association, co-chairman of the Central Headquarters of the People's Front for Russia, managing partner of Key Partner, chairman of the management board of the Center for Evaluation and Management Consulting, chairman of the Russian Board of Appraisers, and professor at the Higher school of Economics.

From September 11, 2013, to May 7, 2018, he served as the Minister of the Russian Federation for the Development of the Far East.

In 2020, he was elected Deputy Secretary of the Civic Chamber of the Russian Federation. Возглавил Координационный совет при Общественной палате по национальным проектам и народосбережению.
