= Vyacheslav Loginov =

Russian politician

- Вячеслав Логинов
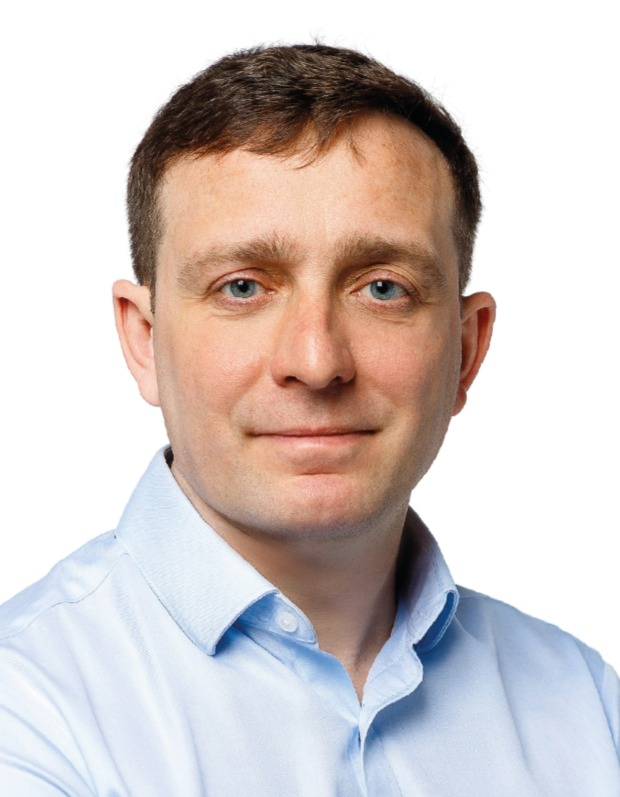

Member of the State Duma
- Incumbent
- Assumed office 12 October 2021
- Preceded by: Andrey Kuzmin
- Constituency: Amur-at-large (No. 71)

Personal details
- Born: 9 January 1979 (age 47) Poyarkovo, Amur Oblast, Russian SFSR, USSR
- Party: United Russia
- Children: 1 son
- Education: Far East State Agrarian University; RANEPA

Vyacheslav Yurievich Loginov (Russian: Вячеслав Юрьевич Логинов; born 9 January 1979 in Poyarkovo, Amur Oblast) is a Russian politician serving as a deputy of the State Duma.

In 2008-2012, Loginov occupied various positions at the Legislative Assembly of Amur Oblast, starting from the adviser to the chairman and to the deputy head of the apparatus. From 2009 to 2011, he worked as a senior lecturer at the Far East State Agrarian University. In 2013-2016, Loginov was a senior lecturer at the Department of Economics and Management of Organizations of the Amur State University. On 18 September 2016 he was elected deputy of the Legislative Assembly of Amur Oblast of the 7th convocation. On 24 January 2019 Loginov was appointed Chairman of the Legislative Assembly of the Amur Region. Since September 2021, he has served as deputy of the 8th State Duma.

== Sanctions ==
He was sanctioned by the UK government in 2022 in relation to the Russo-Ukrainian War.
