= Aleksey Chekunkov =

Russian politician (born 1980)

- Алексей Чекунков
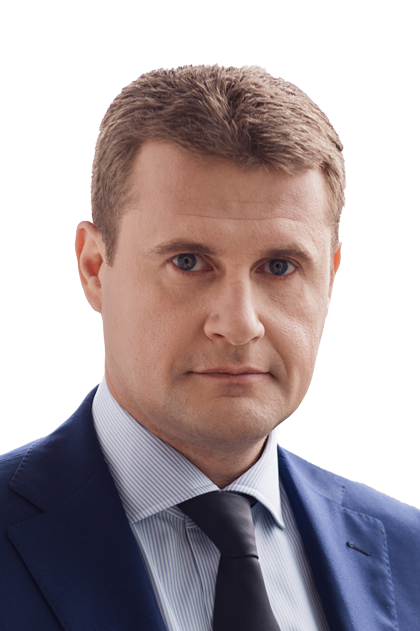
- Official portrait, 2020

Minister for the Development of the Russian Far East and Arctic
- Incumbent
- Assumed office 10 November 2020
- Prime Minister: Mikhail Mishustin
- Preceded by: Alexander Kozlov

Personal details
- Born: 3 October 1980 (age 45) Minsk, Byelorussian SSR, Soviet Union (now Belarus)
- Education: MGIMO; Far Eastern Federal University

Aleksey Olegovich Chekunkov (Russian: Алексе́й Оле́гович Чекунко́в; born 3 October 1980) is a Belarusian-born Russian politician serving as the Minister of Development of the Far East and the Arctic since 10 November 2020.

He also serves as the general director of the Far East Development Fund since 25 September 2014.

== Early life and career ==
Aleksey Chekunkov was born in Minsk, Belarus, to his father Aleh Chakunkov, on 3 October 1980. He graduated from the Faculty of International Economic Relations of the Moscow State Institute of International Relations (University), of the Ministry of Foreign Affairs, and earned a master's degree in State and Municipal Administration of the Far Eastern Federal University.

== Career ==
From 2001 to 2011, Chekunkov worked in executive positions in the private equity sector in Russia. He managed large projects of international and Russian financial organizations (Alrosa, Delta Private Equity, Alfa Group), including in the Far East - in Sakha and the Khabarovsk Krai.

From 2011 to 2013, he participated in the creation, and held the position of director and member of the Management Board and member of the Investment Committee of the Russian Direct Investment Fund. He is responsible for investments in healthcare, energy conservation, the resource sector, as well as for the creation of the Russia-China Investment Fund in conjunction with the China Investment Corporation (CIC).

On 25 September 2014, Chekunkov was the general director of the Far East and Arctic Development Fund.

On 10 November 2020, Chekunkov was appointed to the post of the Minister for the Development of the Russian Far East and Arctic.

Over the years, Chekunkov has served variously as a member of the supervisory board of PJSC AK ALROSA, the board of directors of PJSC RusHydro and other companies.

He is the member of the Government Commission on the Social and Economic Development of the Far East and the State Commission on the Development of the Arctic.

== Sanctions ==
In December 2022 the EU sanctioned Aleksey Chekunkov in relation to the 2022 Russian invasion of Ukraine.

== Personal life ==
Chekunkov's father, Aleh Chakunkov, served in the diplomatic service of Belarus and was the Belarusian ambassador plenipotentiary to Vietnam from 1998 to 2001. Aleksey Chekunkov is married and has two children.
