= Vasily Orlov =

Russian politician (born 1975)

- Василий Орлов
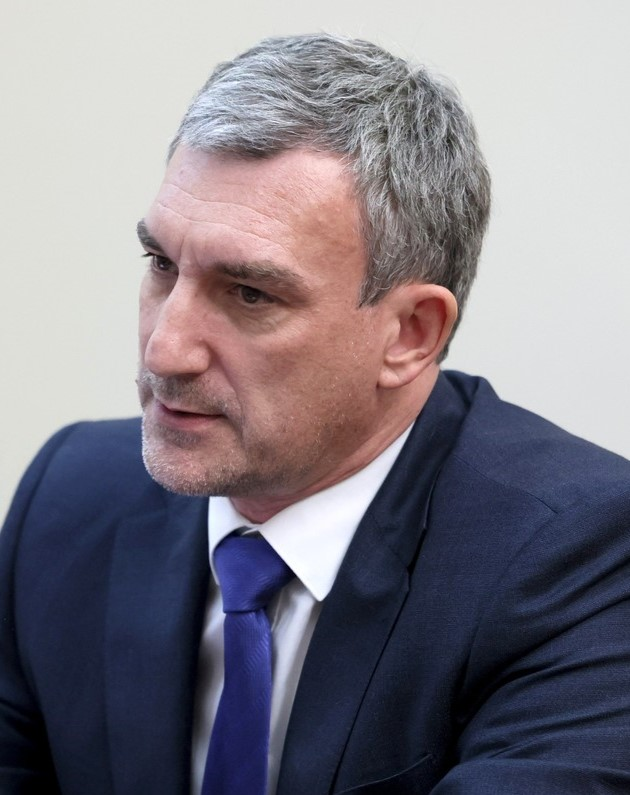
- Orlov in 2023

Governor of Amur Oblast
- Incumbent
- Assumed office 27 September 2018
- Preceded by: Aleksandr Kozlov

Personal details
- Born: Vasily Aleksandrovich Orlov; 14 April 1975 (age 51) Blagoveshchensk, Russia, Soviet Union
- Party: United Russia
- Children: 2
- Education: Blagoveshchensk State Pedagogical University

Vasily Aleksandrovich Orlov (Russian: Василий Александрович Орлов; born on 14 April 1975) is a Russian politician serving as Governor of Amur Oblast since 27 September 2018; previously he served as the acting governor from 30 May 2018 until his election.

== Biography ==
Vasily Orlov was born on April 14, 1975, in the city of Blagoveshchensk.

=== Education ===
In 1998, he graduated from the Department of Chinese and English languages of the Philological Faculty of the Blagoveshchensk State Pedagogical University with the qualification of the teacher of Chinese and English languages, the referent-interpreter of the Chinese language.

In 2002, he received a diploma from the Department of State and Municipal Management of MGIMO in the specialty "state and municipal management" with knowledge of a foreign language with assignment of manager qualifications.

=== Entrepreneurial activity ===
From 2002 to 2007, he held the post of general director of the regional state unitary enterprise "Amur-quality".

From 2007 to 2008, the general director of OJSC Amur Crystal, engaged in the production of alcoholic beverages. He spoke in the media of the Amur region as an expert on issues relating to this type of product.

=== Political activity in Blagoveshchensk ===
On 27 March 2005, he was elected to the City Duma of Blagoveshchensk, IV convocation, in the district No. 9 as a self-nominated candidate with the result of 26.73% of the votes the voters who took part of.

In 2007, he joined the party "United Russia", as a member of the Amur regional party political council.

On 6 October 2008, Orlov took the post of deputy economics of the Mayor of Blagoveshchensk, Aleksandr Migulya. After his dismissal, the latter decided to resign, but he held that position until May 31, 2010.

On 11 March 2012, he was appointed as advisor to the head of the administration of Blagoveshchensk, Pavel Berezovsky.

=== Political activity in the Government of Amur Oblast ===
In August 2012, Orlov went to work in the government of the Amur Oblast. On 1 August 2012 he became deputy minister of economic development of the region.

On 28 May 2013, he was appointed Minister of Economic Development. On 28 September 2015, he was dismissed from this position in connection with the transition to a new job.

=== Work in the holding "Sibur Holding" ===
After dismissal from the post of minister of economic development of Priamurya, Orlov moved to work in the petrochemical holding "Sibur". There, he took the position of representative of the company's general director in the region, representing the interests of the holding, connected with the implementation of the project in the field of gas chemistry and gas processing.

In 2017, the management of SIBUR transferred Orlov to the staff training block in Moscow, where he became an adviser to the company's corporate university.

=== Work as personnel reserve of the Russian president ===
In December 2014, Vasily Orlov joined with Aleksandr Kozlov, (at that time the mayor of Blagoveshchensk), in the reserve of management personnel under the patronage of the Russian president. However, in the updated list of the reserve in 2016, Orlov was no longer listed, instead of him from Amur officials, in addition to Kozlov, the list included Deputy Governor of the Amur Region Andrey Donets.

=== Governor of Amur Oblast ===
On 30 May 2018, Russian President Vladimir Putin held a working meeting with Vasily Orlov. On that part, he announced the decision to appoint him, in connection with the early termination of the powers of the governor of the Amur region, Aleksandr Kozlov, temporarily acting as the governor of the Amur Oblast, issuing an appropriate decree.

Soon, he expressed his willingness to take part in the election of the governor of the region, which should be held 9 September 2018.

== Family ==
He is married, and has two daughters (the oldest was born in 2004, the youngest was born in 2018).

== Sanctions ==
In July 2022, following the Russian invasion of Ukraine, Orlov was sanctioned by the United Kingdom as he was one of the Russian officials supporting the Russian proxy administrations within the Russian-occupied territories of Ukraine. In August 2022, he was included in the sanctions list of Canada as one of the "close associates of the Russian government who are complicit in the Russian aggression against Ukraine."

In October 2022, he was sanctioned by Ukraine due to him being "the head of a state body that supported / encouraged / publicly approved the policy of the Russian Federation aimed at conducting military operations and genocide of the civilian population in Ukraine." In February 2023, the Office of Foreign Assets Control of the United States Department of the Treasury added Orlov to the Specially Designated Nationals and Blocked Persons List due to his involvement in the enforcement of the conscription of Russian citizens in response to the 2022 mobilization order during the invasion.

For similar reasons, he is included in the sanctions lists of Australia and New Zealand.

== Personal life ==
He is the author and performer of songs of his own composition.
