= Novinka, Astrakhan Oblast =

Novinka Новинка
- Selo
- Location within Astrakhan Oblast Location within Russia
- Coordinates: 46°16′N 48°33′E
- Country: Russia
- Region: Astrakhan Oblast
- District: Volodarsky District
- Time zone: UTC+4:00

Novinka (Russian: Новинка) is a rural locality (a selo) in Kalininsky Selsoviet of Volodarsky District, Astrakhan Oblast, Russia. The population was 1,045 as of 2010. There are 10 streets.

== Geography ==
Novinka is located on the Kamardan River, 18 km (11 mi) south of Volodarsky (the district's administrative centre) by road. Kamardan is the nearest rural locality.
