= Leonid Korotkov =

Russian politician (born 1965)

- Леонид Коротков
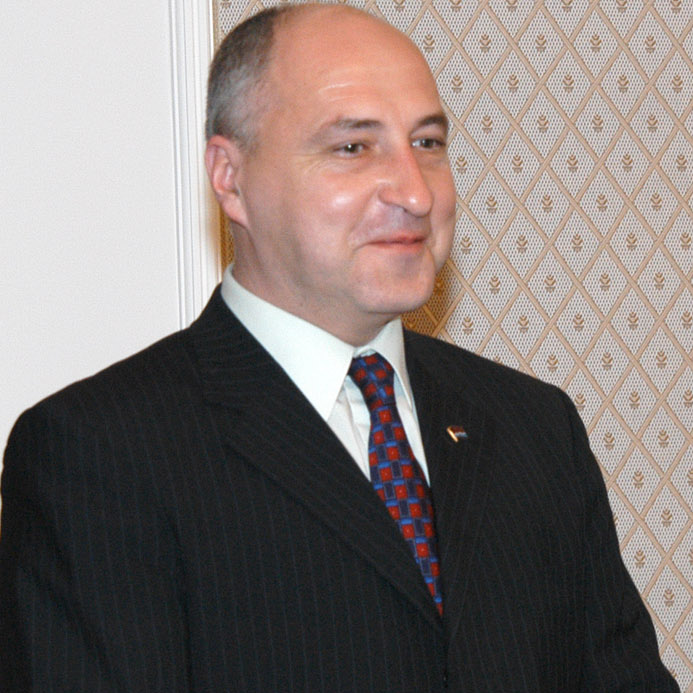
- Korotkov in January 2006

7th Governor of Amur Oblast
- In office 21 April 2001 – 10 May 2007
- Preceded by: Anatoly Belonogov
- Succeeded by: Aleksandr Nesterenko (acting), Nikolay Kolesov

Member of the State Duma
- In office 17 January 1996 – 12 April 2001
- Constituency: Blagoveshchensk (No. 58)

Member of the Federation Council from Amur Oblast
- In office 11 January 1994 – 15 January 1996

Personal details
- Born: 19 January 1965 (age 61) Zavitinsk, Amur Oblast, RSFSR, Soviet Union
- Party: Independent
- Other political affiliations: CPRF (?–1999)
- Children: 3
- Education: Far Eastern State University

Leonid Viktorovich Korotkov (Russian: Леонид Викторович Коротков, born January 19, 1965), in Zavitinsk, was the governor of Amur Oblast in the Russian Far East. He graduated from Far Eastern University in 1987. He was a member of the Communist Party of Russia. He became governor in 2001, when he defeated the incumbent Anatoly Belonogov in a runoff. He had been a distant second with only 20% of the vote in the first round, but the incumbent got less than 50% of the vote so Korotkov could participate in the runoff, which he narrowly won.

== Political activity ==
In February 2005, Korotkov was renominated by President Vladimir Putin and confirmed for a second term by the local Parliament. He was one of the first governors to be elected in this way, as a law abolishing direct election of governors and presidents of the Russian republics had just taken effect. Putin sacked Korotkov from his position on May 10, 2007 after he was charged with abuse of power, appointing the oblast's agriculture minister Alexander Nesterenko as acting governor. Putin later appointed Nikolai Kolesov as Amur oblast's governor. President Dmitry Medvedev sacked Kolesov in October 2008 when Putin's appointee faced charges of illegally building a country house in a nature reserve.

A court in Blagoveshchensk on 27 December 2010 acquitted Korotkov of the charges he had faced of raising electricity tariffs to illegally bankroll the local soccer team, buying vehicles at inflated prices and paying 16 million roubles (about $620,000) to a mining company for a controlling stake that was allegedly never transferred to the oblast government.
