= Vladimir Polevanov =

Russian politician (born 1949)

- Владимир Полеванов

Deputy Prime Minister of Russia
- In office 15 November 1994 – 24 January 1995
- President: Boris Yeltsin
- Prime Minister: Viktor Chernomyrdin

Chairman of the State Property Committee
- In office 15 November 1994 – 24 January 1995
- President: Boris Yeltsin
- Prime Minister: Viktor Chernomyrdin
- Preceded by: Anatoly Chubais
- Succeeded by: Sergey Belyaev

3rd Governor of Amur Oblast
- In office 5 October 1993 – 14 November 1994
- Preceded by: Aleksandr Surat
- Succeeded by: Vladimir Dyachenko

Personal details
- Born: November 11, 1949 (age 76) Kharkov, Ukrainian SSR, Soviet Union
- Occupation: Politician
- Profession: Geologist

Vladimir Pavlovich Polevanov (Russian: Владимир Павлович Полеванов; born 11 November 1949) is a former Russian politician who served as a Deputy Chairman of Government of the Russian Federation during the administration of President Boris Yeltsin. He was also chairman of the State Property Committee and governor of the Amur Oblast.

== In government ==
Originally he had been the governor of the Amur Oblast (1993–1994) who had supported Yeltsin during the 1993 Russian constitutional crisis. The fall of the Russian ruble against the dollar in October 1994 brought about a shakeup in Yeltsin's economic team. Polevanov was recommended by Anatoly Chubais, although he was originally a geologist by profession. He was appointed Deputy Prime Minister of Russia and chairman of the State Property Committee (Russia's privatization agency) on 15 November 1994. Polevanov was removed from those positions on 24 January 1995 after advocating for the re-nationalization of certain sectors after their "improper privatization," including energy and defense; objecting to the influence of foreign investment; and barring Western advisors from the Committee, to protect national secrets. In effect, Polevanov was criticized for being against privatizing key sectors of the economy, which he believed was threat to national security–something that damaged the confidence of foreign investors. This cooled his relations with Chubais, who later engineered his removal from the post.

== Sources ==
=== Books ===
- Barnes, Andrew Scott (2006). Owning Russia: The Struggle Over Factories, Farms, and Power. Cornell University Press. ISBN 9780801444340.
- Jeffries, Ian (2013). Economies in Transition. Routledge. ISBN 9781134776900.
- Kokh, Alfred (1998). The Selling of the Soviet Empire: Politics & Economics of Russia's Privatization--revelations of the Principal Insider. SP Books. ISBN 9781561719846.
- Orttung, Robert W. (2000). The Republics and Regions of the Russian Federation: A Guide to Politics, Policies, and Leaders. M.E. Sharpe. ISBN 9780765605597.
