= Governor of Amur Oblast =

Highest-ranking official in Amur Oblast, Russia

- Coat of arms of Amur Oblast

- Standard of the governor

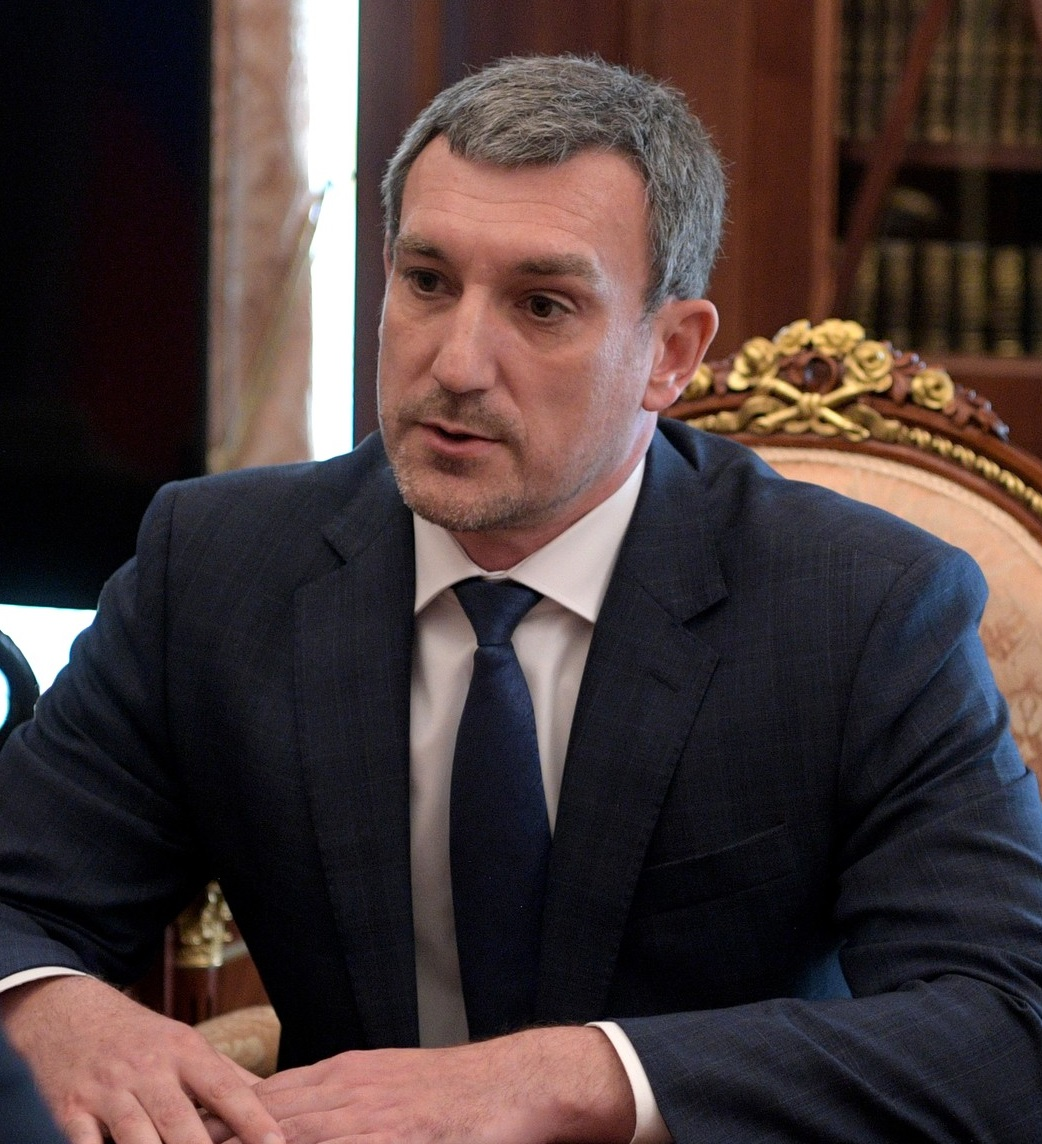
- Incumbent; Vasily Orlov since 30 May 2018
- Residence: Blagoveshchensk
- Term length: Five years
- Constituting instrument: Charter of Amur Oblast, Section 5
- Inaugural holder: Albert Krivchenko
- Formation: 1991
- Website: www.amurobl.ru

The Governor of Amur Oblast (Russian: Губернатор Амурской области) is the head of the executive branch of the government of Amur Oblast, a federal subject (an oblast) of Russia.

The current governor is Vasily Orlov, who has held the position since 30 May 2018.

== List of governors ==
No.	Portrait	Governor	Tenure	Time in office	Party	Election
1		Albert Krivchenko (1935–2021)	8 October 1991 – 29 April 1993 (lost election)	1 year, 203 days	Independent	Appointed
2		Aleksandr Surat (1947–2016)	29 April 1993 – 5 October 1993 (removed)	159 days	Independent	1993
–		Vladimir Polevanov (born 1949)	5 October 1993 – 18 December 1993	1 year, 40 days	Independent	Acting
3		Vladimir Polevanov (born 1949)	18 December 1993 – 14 November 1994 (resigned)	1 year, 40 days	Independent	Appointed
–		Vladimir Dyachenko (1948–2024)	14 November 1994 – 3 December 1994	1 year, 185 days	Independent	Acting
4		Vladimir Dyachenko (1948–2024)	3 December 1994 – 17 May 1996 (removed)	1 year, 185 days	Independent	Appointed
–		Aleksandr Surat (1947–2016)	17 May 1996 – 3 June 1996	17 days	Independent	Acting
5		Yury Lyashko (1943–2015)	3 June 1996 – 29 March 1997 (lost election)	299 days	Independent	Appointed
6		Anatoly Belonogov (1939–2019)	29 March 1997 – 21 April 2001 (lost re-election)	4 years, 23 days	Communist Party	~~1996~~ (Note: Annulled election); 1997
7		Leonid Korotkov (born 1965)	21 April 2001 – 10 May 2007 (removed)	6 years, 19 days	Independent	2001; 2005 (Note: Appointed by the president of Russia with the consent of the Amur Oblast Council of People's Deputies.)
–		Aleksandr Nesterenko (born 1947)	10 May 2007 – 1 June 2007 (successor took office)	22 days	United Russia	Acting
8		Nikolay Kolesov (born 1956)	1 June 2007 – 16 October 2008 (resigned)	1 year, 137 days	United Russia	2007
–		Oleg Kozhemyako (born 1962)	16 October 2008 – 20 October 2008	6 years, 160 days	United Russia	Acting
9		Oleg Kozhemyako (born 1962)	20 October 2008 – 25 March 2015 (resigned)	6 years, 160 days	United Russia	2008 (Note: Appointed by the president of Russia with the consent of the Legislative Assembly of Amur Oblast.); 2012
–		Alexander Kozlov (born 1981)	25 March 2015 – 20 September 2015	3 years, 54 days	United Russia	Acting
10		Alexander Kozlov (born 1981)	20 September 2015 – 18 May 2018 (resigned)	3 years, 54 days	United Russia	2015
—		Vasily Orlov (born 1975)	30 May 2018 – 27 September 2018	8 years, 100 days	United Russia	Acting
11		Vasily Orlov (born 1975)	27 September 2018 – present	8 years, 100 days	United Russia	2018; 2023

== Elections ==
=== 2015 ===
Results of the 13 September 2015 election for the office.

Candidates	Party	Votes	%
Ivan Abramov	Liberal Democratic Party of Russia	60,545	28.30
Mikhail Dragunov	Communist Party of Social Justice	7,764	3.63
Roman Kobyzov	Communist Party of the Russian Federation	31,822	14.87
Alexander Kozlov	United Russia	108,363	50.64

== Sources ==
- World Statesmen.org
