= Ivan Abramov =

Russian politician (born 1978)

- Иван Абрамов
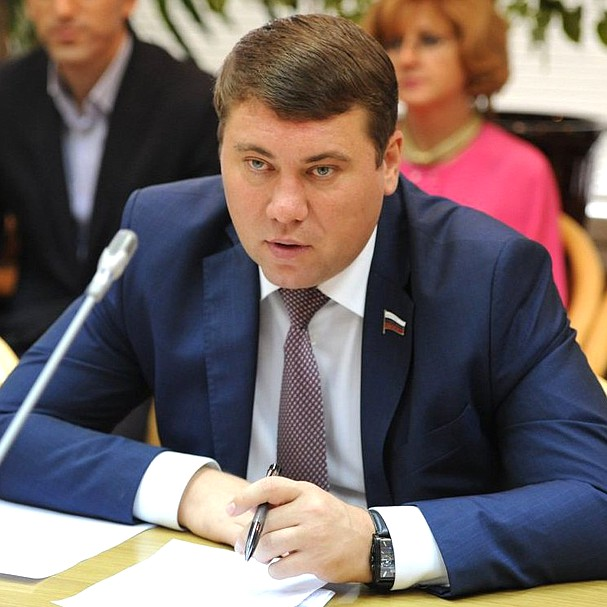

Senator from Amur Oblast
- Incumbent
- Assumed office 27 September 2018
- Preceded by: Alexander Suvorov

Personal details
- Born: Ivan Abramov; 16 June 1978 (age 48) Blagoveshchensk, Amur Oblast, Soviet Union
- Party: Liberal Democratic Party of Russia
- Education: Far Eastern State Agrarian University, Russian Presidential Academy of National Economy and Public Administration

Ivan Nikolayevich Abramov (Russian: Иван Николаевич Абрамов; born 16 June 1978) is a Russian politician serving as a senator from Amur Oblast since 27 September 2018.

== Career ==
Ivan Abramov was born on 16 June 1978 in Blagoveshchensk, Amur Oblast. In 2000, he graduated from the Far Eastern State Agrarian University, and in 2011 he received another degree from the Russian Presidential Academy of National Economy and Public Administration. After graduating from the Far Eastern State Agrarian University, Abramov engaged with private enterprise. In 2004, he joined the Liberal Democratic Party of Russia. On 21 October 2005, he became the head of the regional branch in Amur Oblast. On 2 March 2008, he was elected deputy of the Legislative Assembly of Amur Oblast of the 5th convocation. From 2011 to 2016, he was deputy of the 6th State Duma. From 2016 to 2018, he was deputy of the 7th State Duma. On 27 September 2018, he was appointed senator from Amur Oblast.

== Sanctions ==
Ivan Abramov is under personal sanctions introduced by the European Union, the United Kingdom, the USA, Canada, Switzerland, Australia, Ukraine, New Zealand, for ratifying the decisions of the "Treaty of Friendship, Cooperation and Mutual Assistance between the Russian Federation and the Donetsk People's Republic and between the Russian Federation and the Luhansk People's Republic" and providing political and economic support for Russia's annexation of Ukrainian territories.

== Family ==
His father, Nikolai Ivanovich Abramov, was deputy director of the Blagoveshchensk Meat Processing Plant.

His mother, Lyubov Vladimirovna Abramova, was a physician.

He is married and has four children: a daughter, Erika, and three sons — Nikolai, Nazar, and Miron. Since childhood, he has been passionate about hockey.

His older brother, Sergey, served as a deputy of the Blagoveshchensk City Duma from 2005 to 2011. In 2011, he became the head of the LDPR faction in the regional Legislative Assembly, was re-elected in 2016, and left his position as a deputy in 2017.
