= Novinka, Amur Oblast =

Novinka Новинка
- Selo
- Location within Amur Oblast Location within Russia
- Coordinates: 50°38′N 127°39′E
- Country: Russia
- Region: Amur Oblast
- District: Blagoveshchensky District

Population (2018)
  - Total: 151
- Time zone: UTC+9:00

Novinka (Russian: Новинка) is a rural locality (a selo) in Novopetrovsky Selsoviet of Blagoveshchensky District, Amur Oblast, Russia. The population was 151 as of 2018. There are 5 streets.

== Geography ==
Novinka is located 49 km north of Blagoveshchensk (the district's administrative centre) by road. Yegoryevka is the nearest rural locality.
