= Blagoveshchensk State Pedagogical University =

Blagoveschensk State Pedagogical University
- Благовещенский государственный педагогический университет имени М. И. Калинина
- Established: 1930
- Rector: Vera Shchyokina (Russian: Вера Витальевна Щёкина)
- Students: 4,000
- Address: 104 Lenina Street, Blagoveshchensk, Amur Oblast, Russia; 50.25°N 127.533333°E
- Website: https://bgpu.ru/

Building details
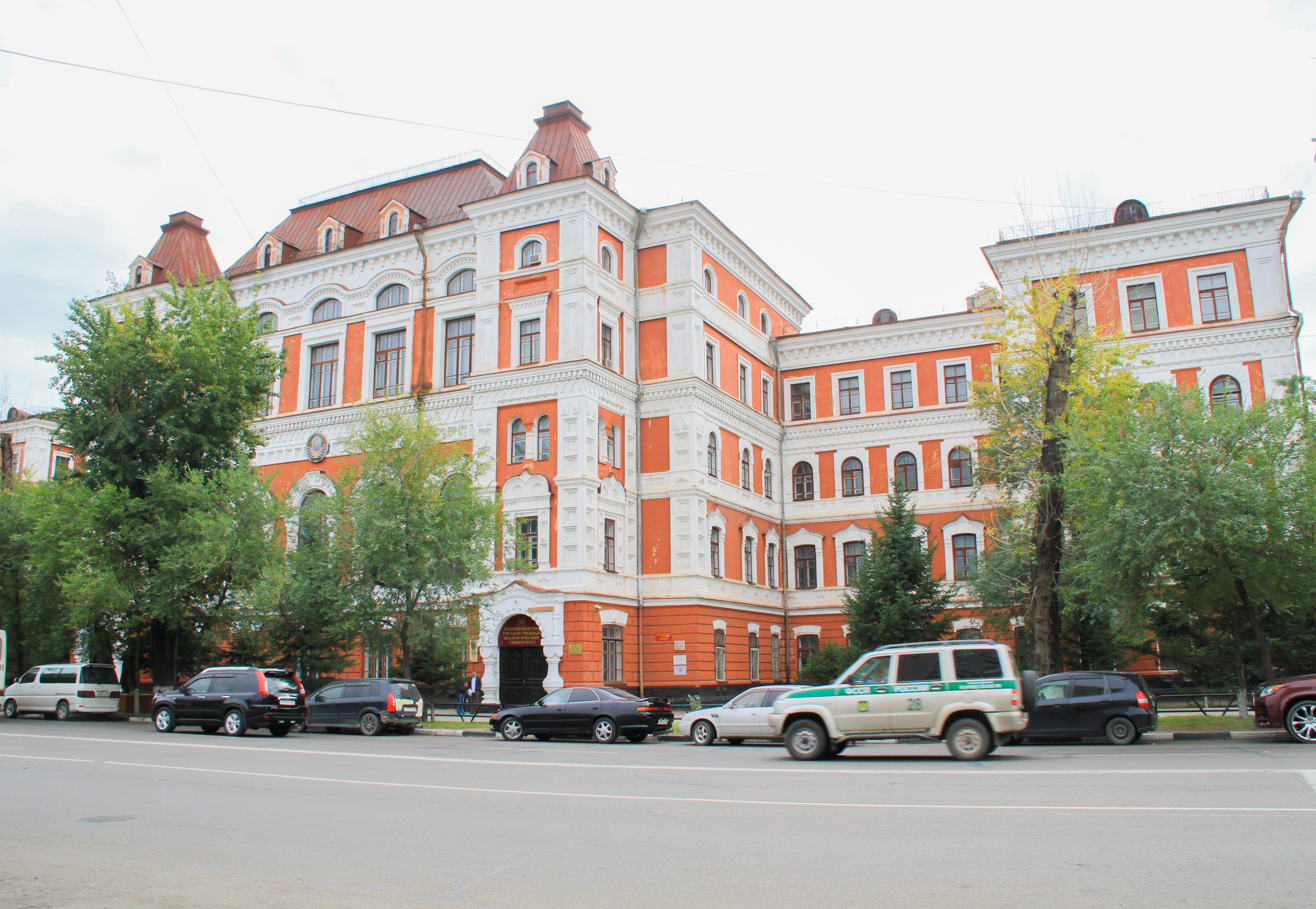
- Main building at 104 Lenina Street

General information
- Completed: 1912

Blagoveschensk State Pedagogical University (BSPU) is located in Blagoveschensk, the administrative center of the Amur Oblast. The city of Blagoveschensk was founded in 1856 and is one of the most important administrative, cultural, scientific, and industrial centers of the Russian Far East region; with more than 220,000 inhabitants. Blagoveschensk is often called “The Gate to China” for its unique location on the border with China. The Chinese city Heihe is located directly across the river Amur, and many Chinese companies work in the Amur region in the timber industry, agriculture, construction, and tourism.

Vera Schekina (Щекина Вера Витальевна), the rector of the Blagoveshchensk State Pedagogical University has signed a letter of support for the Russian invasion of Ukraine.

== Overview ==
BSPU was founded in 1930 and is one of the oldest educational institutions in the Far East of Russia. There are over 400 faculty members and about 6,000 students within 10 departments, across 35 specialties. The university also has 14 postgraduate courses; both of pedagogical and non-pedagogical specializations. The university library was the only scientific library in Amur region before 1955. It currently hosts more than 600,000 copies. There are 6 reading halls which can seat 600 people. In 2004 with the help of the Heihe Institute, the library opened the class of Chinese studies, where students can read Chinese newspapers, watch Chinese movies and practice their pronunciation skills. There are 19 computer classes with Internet access and modern multimedia equipment.

Additionally, BSPU has its own printing office and 20 scientific laboratories and research centers, including a chemical laboratory of hetero-organic substances, laboratory of modern educational technologies, the center of environmental studies, an archeological museum, the center of linguistics and communication, and an insect laboratory. The university has established a strong partnership with leading Russian universities and scientific centers, such as Moscow State University, Moscow State Pedagogical University, and Far Eastern State University .

== History ==
On October 16, 1930 the Blagoveshchensk Agrarian-Pedagogical Institute (later Pedagogical) was founded (the building of the men's Blagoveshchensk Gymnasium, built in 1912-1913 by architect Eduard Schaefer).

On January 14, 1981 the Institute was awarded the Order of the Badge of Honour.

In 1995 the Blagoveshchensk State Pedagogical Institute received the status of a university. On December 23, 1996 it became the Blagoveshchensk State Pedagogical University.

== International cooperation ==
BSPU has relations with the Chinese educational institutions of Heihe Institute, Changchun University, Harbin Pedagogical University, Harbin University, Far-Eastern University of Finances and Economics, Daqing Pedagogical Institute, Harbin Institute of Technology, Beijing University of Language and Culture and others.

BSPU and Heihe Institute are engaged in a joint bachelor's degree project in Philology, where Chinese students study for 2 years in Heihe and 2 years in Blagoveschensk.

In August 2005 BSPU joined the consortium of Russian universities engaged in a distance learning project started by the Institute for International Studies at Stanford University (USA). Russian students study international relations, political science, and environmental issues. The best students take part in annual international student conferences. In June 2005 BSPU became a member of the university network collaborating with the Department of Culture and Cooperation of the French Embassy in Russia. BSPU established a Resource Center of French Language and Culture that provides students and professors with training aids and up-to-date information on educational and cultural programs organized by the French Embassy. Students often take language courses in China, Great Britain, America, or Germany during summer vacation.

== Departments ==
Department of Physics and Mathematics: Teacher of Physics and Mathematics Teacher of Computer Science and Mathematics Teacher of Physics and Computer Science Teacher of Computer Science and Translator in IT sphere Mathematician-Programmer Engineer

Department of Natural Sciences and Geography: Teacher of Geography and Biology Teacher of Biology and Chemistry Department of History and Philology: Historian, Teacher of History Teacher of Russian Language and Literature Russian as a Foreign Language

Department of Pedagogics and Elementary Education: Teacher of Elementary School Teacher-Logopedist Teacher of Pre-School Pedagogics and Psychology Oligophrenopedagogics Psychologist in Corrective Educational Institutions

Department of Foreign Languages: Teacher of Foreign Languages, Interpreter: English as Primary and French as Secondary, French as Primary and English as Secondary, English as Primary and German as Secondary, German as Primary and English as Secondary, Chinese as Primary and English as Secondary, English as Primary and Chinese as Secondary

Department of Physical Culture and Sport: Teacher of Physical Culture Specialist in Physical Culture and Sport Specialist in Life Security

Department of Industry and Pedagogics: Arts and Crafts Clothing Designer Technology and Design of Materials The technology of Ready-Made Garments

Department of Psychology and Pedagogics: Teacher-Psychologist Manager and Translator in Business Economics

International Department (for foreign students): Teacher of Russian as a foreign language

Department of History and Philology:

== Postgraduate studies ==
- Russian History
- World History
- Physics of Conductors and Dielectrics
- Chemical Physics
- Chemistry of Hetero-Organic Substances
- Russian Literature
- Russian Language
- Germanic Languages
- Romanic Languages
- Physical Geography
- Soil Science
- General Pedagogics
- History of Pedagogics
- Theory and Methodology of Education
- Culture Studies
