= Alexander Kozlov =

Russian politician

- Александр Козлов
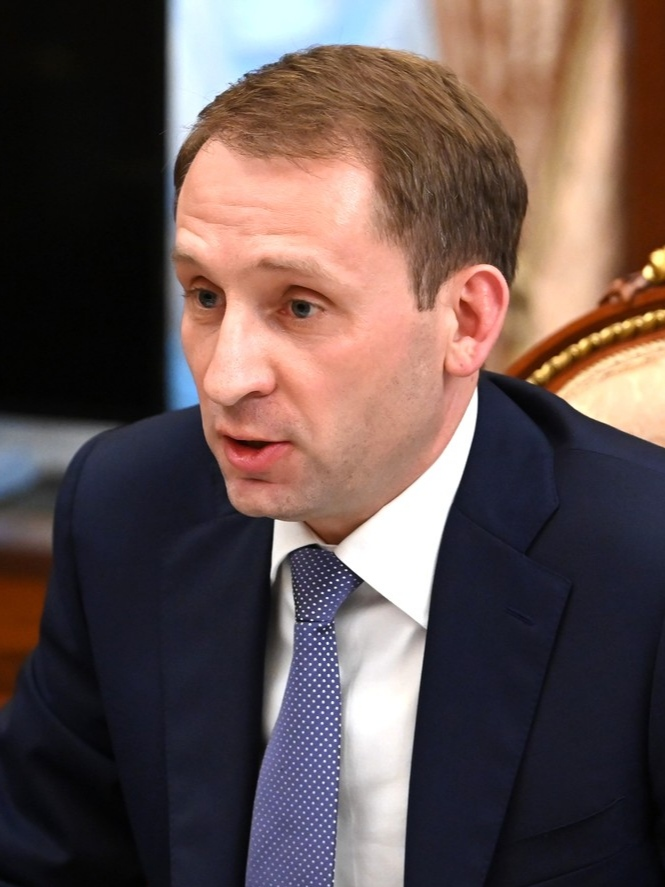
- Kozlov in 2023

4th Minister of Natural Resources and Environment
- Incumbent
- Assumed office 10 November 2020
- Prime Minister: Mikhail Mishustin
- Preceded by: Dmitry Kobylkin

3rd Minister for Development of the Far East and Arctic
- In office 18 May 2018 – 10 November 2020
- Prime Minister: Dmitry Medvedev; Mikhail Mishustin
- Preceded by: Aleksandr Galushka
- Succeeded by: Aleksey Chekunkov

Personal details
- Born: 2 January 1981 (age 45) Yuzhno-Sakhalinsk, Sakhalin Oblast, RSFSR, Soviet Union
- Party: United Russia

Alexander Alexandrovich Kozlov (Russian: Алекса́ндр Алекса́ндрович Козло́в; born 2 January 1981 in Yuzhno-Sakhalinsk) is a Russian politician serving as the Minister of Natural Resources and Ecology of Russia since 10 November 2020.

Previously he served as Minister for the Development of the Russian Far East and Arctic from 2018 to 2020, Governor of Amur Oblast from 2015 to 2018, and Mayor of Blagoveshchensk from 2014 to 2015.

== Education ==
In 2003, Kozlov graduated from the Blagoveshchensk branch of the Moscow Academy of Entrepreneurship under the Government of Moscow with a degree in law, receiving the qualification of lawyer. As of April 2014, he was enrolled at the Far Eastern Federal University, majoring in mining engineering, but did not complete his studies.

According to the outlet Znak, citing a source close to the presidential administration, Kozlov “did not study a single day” at the university. The website of the Federal Service for Supervision in Education and Science also contains no record of him graduating from a higher education institution. However, Kozlov’s press secretary stated that he did receive an education, adding that she had witnesses among friends who studied with him at the university.

== Business career ==
In 2000, at the age of 19 and without specialized training, Kozlov began working as a legal adviser at the company Dalvostugol. In 2004, it was reorganized into Amur-Ugol, where Kozlov headed one of the Rosugol branches in the city of Gukovo. A year later, he became director of the Blagoveshchensk branch of OJSC Russkiy Ugol. During his time in the structures of Russkiy Ugol, he was referred to as a member of the team of Amur Oblast governor Nikolay Kolesov.

From 2009 to 2010, he served as general director of Amurskiy Ugol LLC in Raychikhinsk.

== Sanctions ==
In December 2022 the EU sanctioned Alexander Kozlov in relation to the 2022 Russian invasion of Ukraine.
