= Ministry for the Development of the Russian Far East and Arctic =

Government minister of Russia

Ministry of the Russian Federation for Development of the Russian Far East and Arctic
- Министерство Российской Федерации по развитию Дальнего Востока и Арктики; Ministerstvo Rossiiskoi Federatsii po razvitiyu Dalnego Vostoka i Arktiki
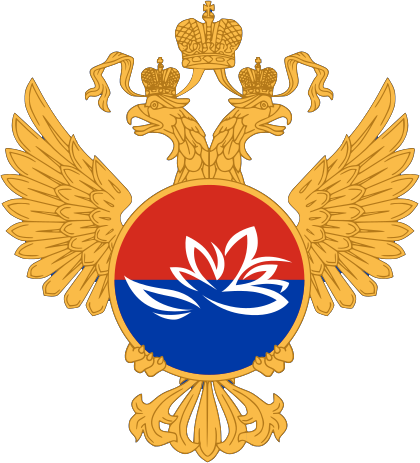

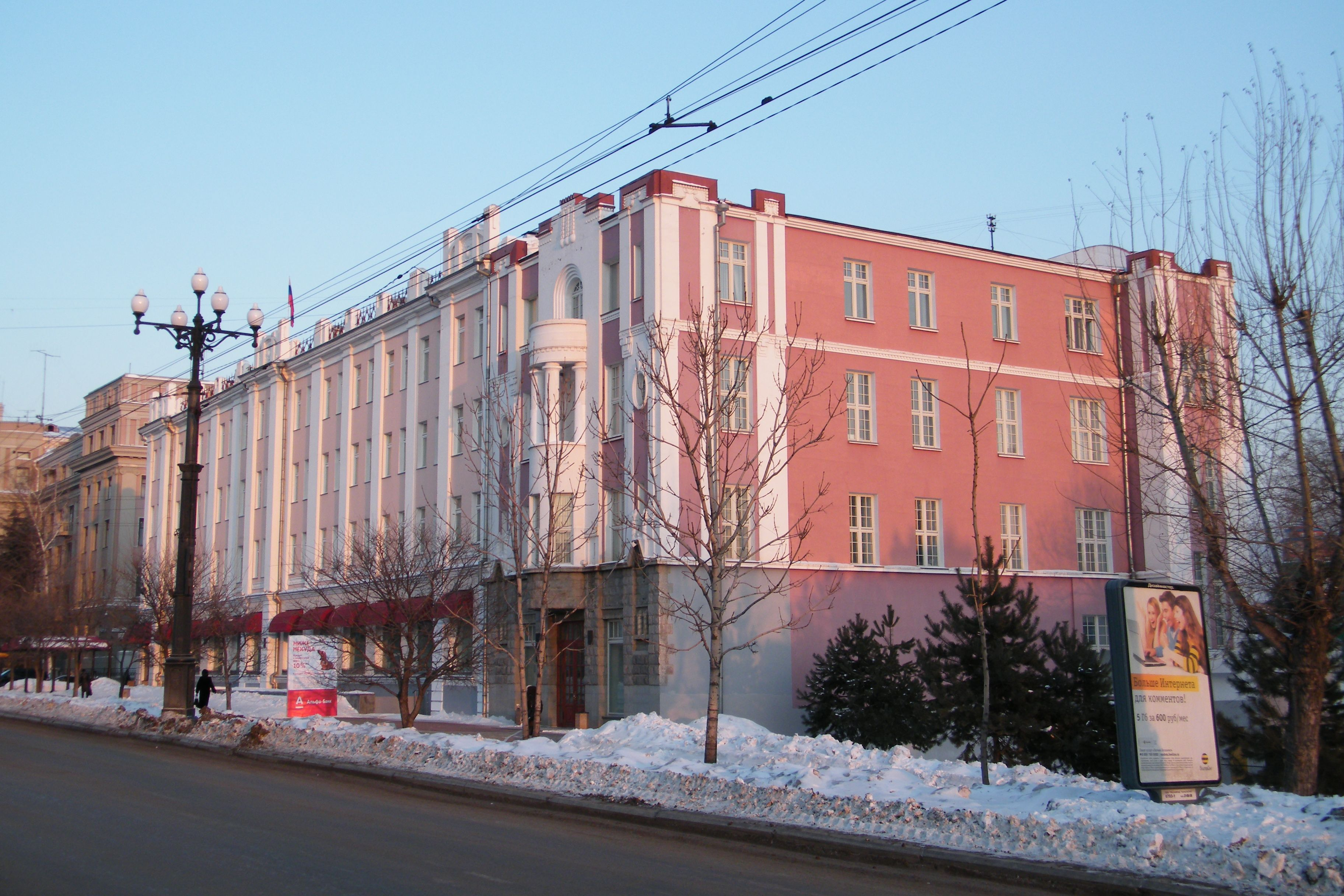
- Office building of the Ministry in Khabarovsk

Agency overview
- Formed: May 21, 2012
- Jurisdiction: Russian Far East in the Russian Federation
- Headquarters: Moscow
- Minister responsible: Aleksey Chekunkov, Minister of the Development of the Russian Far East and Arctic
- Website: eng.minvr.ru

The Ministry for the Development of the Russian Far East and Arctic (Note: The full official name is Ministry of the Russian Federation for the Development of the Far East and Arctic.) (Russian: Министерство Российской Федерации по развитию Дальнего Востока и Арктики) is a ministry of the Government of Russia responsible for the economic and social development of the Russian Far East and Russian Arctic.

The Ministry for Development of the Russian Far East and Arctic was established on 21 May 2012 by the First Medvedev Cabinet. It was known as the Ministry for Development of the Russian Far East until 26 February 2019.

Aleksey Chekunkov has served as the Minister of the Development of the Russian Far East and Arctic since 10 November 2020.

== List of ministers of the development of the Russian Far East and Arctic ==
- Viktor Ishayev (21 May 2012 – 31 August 2013)
- Alexander Galushka (31 August 2013 – 7 May 2018)
- Alexander Kozlov (18 May 2018 – 10 November 2020)
- Aleksey Chekunkov (10 November 2020 – present)
