= Legislative Assembly of Amur Oblast =

Regional parliament of Amur Oblast, Russia

Legislative Assembly of Amur Oblast Законодательное собрание Амурской области
- 8th legislature
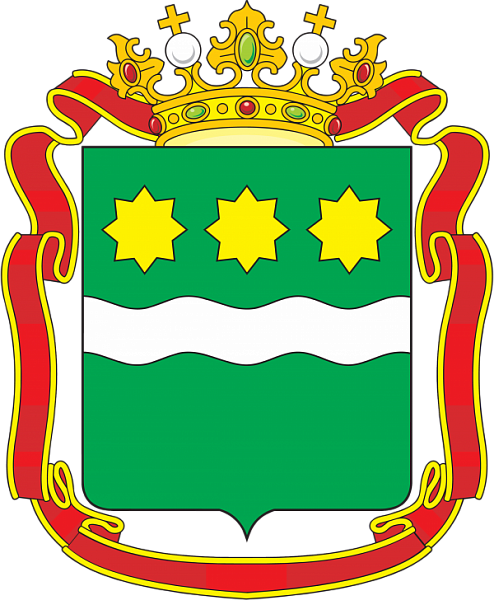

Type
- Type: Unicameral

Leadership
- Chairman: Konstantin Dyakonov, United Russia since September 2021

Structure
- Seats: 27
- Political groups: United Russia (18) CPRF (3); LDPR (1); SRZP (1); RPPSJ (1); New People (1); CPCR (1) Independent (1)

Elections
- Voting system: Mixed
- Last election: 19 September 2021
- Next election: 2026

Meeting place
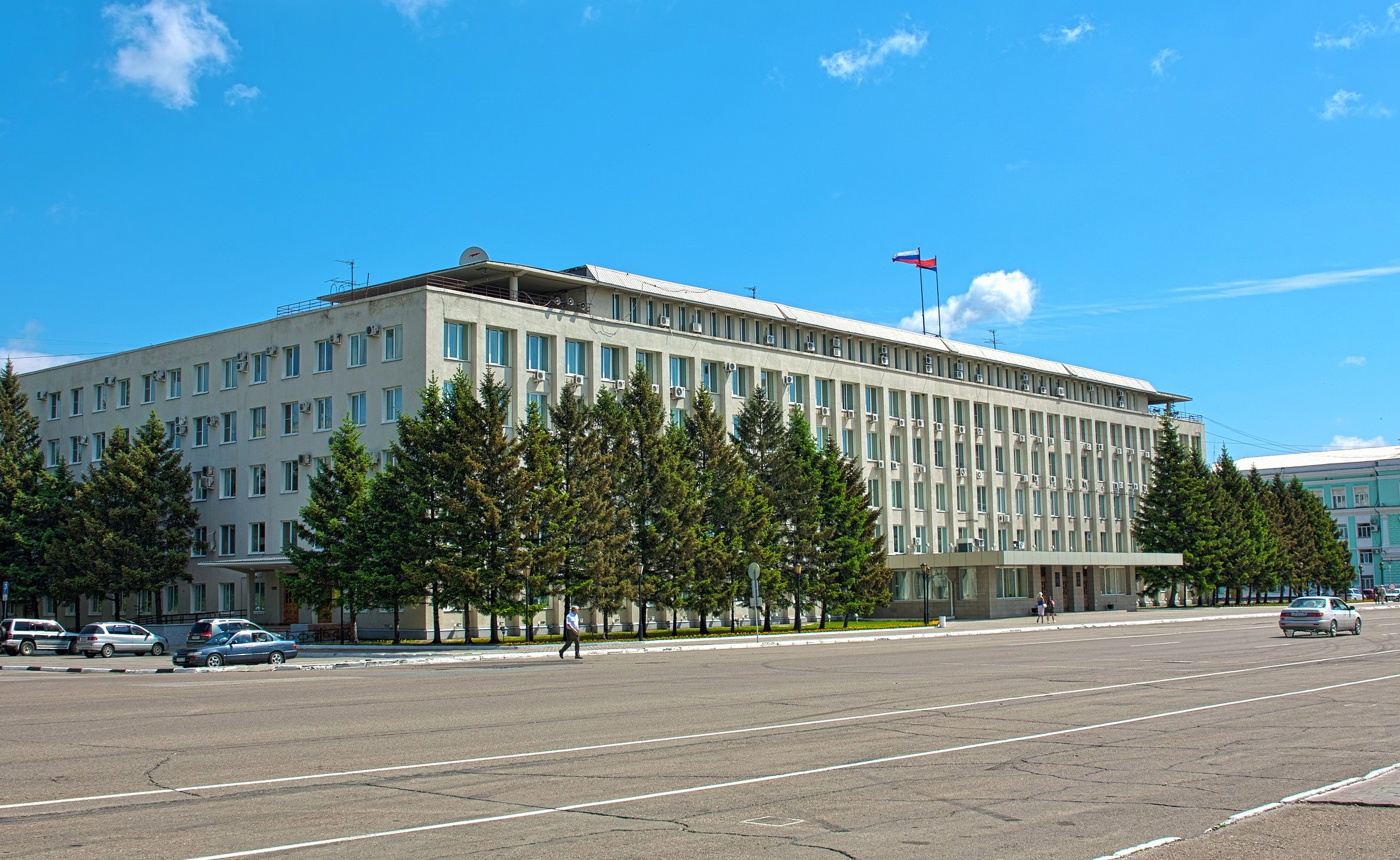
- 135 Lenin Street, Blagoveshchensk

Website
- www.zsamur.ru

The Legislative Assembly of Amur Oblast (Russian: Законодательное собрание Амурской области), previously the Council of People's Deputies of Amur Oblast until 2008, (Note: Russian: Совет народных депутатов Амурской области) is the regional parliament of Amur Oblast, a federal subject of Russia. A total of 27 deputies are elected for five-year terms.

== Elections ==
=== 2021 ===
Party	%	Seats (Note: Number of seats reduced from 36 to 27 in January 2021.)
United Russia	33.15	18
Communist Party of the Russian Federation	21.48	3
Liberal Democratic Party of Russia	14.16	1
Communists of Russia	8.26	1
New People	7.18	1
A Just Russia — For Truth	6.28	1
Russian Party of Pensioners for Social Justice	5.41	1
Self-nominated	—	1
Registered voters/turnout	40.62	

== Composition ==
Party	Head	V convocation (% of seats)	VI convocation (% of seats)	VII convocation (% of seats)	VIII convocation (% of seats)
United Russia	Tatyana Farafontova	25 (69.45%)	17 (47.22%)	25 (69.45%)	18 (66.67%)
CPRF	Roman Kobyzov	7 (19.44%)	8 (22.22%)	3 (8.33%)	3 (11.11%)
LDPR	Sergey Abramov	4 (11.11%)	8 (22.22%)	7 (19.44%)	1 (3.70%)
A Just Russia — For Truth	Kirill Zimin	0 (0%)	3 (8.34%)	1 (2.78%)	1 (3.70%)

== Powers ==
By the federal law «About general principles of legislative (representative) and executive bodies of state authorities of federal subjects of the Russian Federation», other federal laws, the Main Law of the Amur Oblast is determined, that the Legislative Assembly of the Amur Oblast:

1) accepts the Main Law of the Amur Oblast and amendments to it;

2) performs legislative regulation on subjects of the area and subjects of the joint jurisdiction of the Russian Federation and areas within the powers of the region;

3) performs other powers, established by the Constitution of the Russian Federation, federal laws, the Main Law of the Amur Oblast, and other laws of the region.

== Committees ==
- Committee on the budget, taxes, economy and area property
- Committee on questions of an agrarian policy, environmental management and ecology
- Committee on questions of the legislation, local government and to regulations
- Committee on questions of social policy
