= Putyatino =

Set index of articles associated with the same name

Putyatino (Russian: Путятино) is the name of several rural localities in Russia:

- Putyatino, Amur Oblast, a selo in Putyatinsky Rural Settlement of Mazanovsky District of Amur Oblast
- Putyatino, Arkhangelsk Oblast, a village in Ilyinsky Selsoviet of Vilegodsky District of Arkhangelsk Oblast
- Putyatino, Ivanovo Oblast, a village in Gavrilovo-Posadsky District of Ivanovo Oblast
- Putyatino, Kostroma Oblast, a village in Voskresenskoye Settlement of Nerekhtsky District of Kostroma Oblast
- Putyatino, Leningrad Oblast, a village in Zaklinskoye Settlement Municipal Formation of Luzhsky District of Leningrad Oblast
- Putyatino, Lipetsk Oblast, a selo in Putyatinsky Selsoviet of Dobrovsky District of Lipetsk Oblast
- Putyatino, Sergiyevo-Posadsky District, Moscow Oblast, a village in Bereznyakovskoye Rural Settlement of Sergiyevo-Posadsky District of Moscow Oblast
- Putyatino, Volokolamsky District, Moscow Oblast, a village in Kashinskoye Rural Settlement of Volokolamsky District of Moscow Oblast
- Putyatino, Nizhny Novgorod Oblast, a selo in Smirnovsky Selsoviet of Shatkovsky District of Nizhny Novgorod Oblast
- Putyatino, Orenburg Oblast, a selo in Putyatinsky Selsoviet of Sharlyksky District of Orenburg Oblast
- Putyatino, Ryazan Oblast, a selo in Putyatinsky Rural Okrug of Putyatinsky District of Ryazan Oblast
- Putyatino, Glinkovsky District, Smolensk Oblast, a village in Romodanovskoye Rural Settlement of Glinkovsky District of Smolensk Oblast
- Putyatino, Monastyrshchinsky District, Smolensk Oblast, a village in Alexandrovskoye Rural Settlement of Monastyrshchinsky District of Smolensk Oblast
- Putyatino, Pochinkovsky District, Smolensk Oblast, a village in Striginskoye Rural Settlement of Pochinkovsky District of Smolensk Oblast
- Putyatino, Vologda Oblast, a village in Nesvoysky Selsoviet of Vologodsky District of Vologda Oblast
- Putyatino, Dmitriyevsky Rural Okrug, Danilovsky District, Yaroslavl Oblast, a station in Dmitriyevsky Rural Okrug of Danilovsky District of Yaroslavl Oblast
- Putyatino, Semivragovsky Rural Okrug, Danilovsky District, Yaroslavl Oblast, a village in Semivragovsky Rural Okrug of Danilovsky District of Yaroslavl Oblast
- Putyatino, Nekrasovsky District, Yaroslavl Oblast, a selo in Grebovsky Rural Okrug of Nekrasovsky District of Yaroslavl Oblast
- Putyatino, Pervomaysky District, Yaroslavl Oblast, a village in Prechistensky Rural Okrug of Pervomaysky District of Yaroslavl Oblast
