= Bogoslovka =

Bogoslovka (Russian: Богословка) is the name of several rural localities in Russia.

== Modern localities ==
- Bogoslovka, Ivanovsky District, Amur Oblast, a selo in Andreyevsky Rural Settlement of Ivanovsky District in Amur Oblast
- Bogoslovka, Mazanovsky District, Amur Oblast, a selo in Bogoslovsky Rural Settlement of Mazanovsky District in Amur Oblast
- Bogoslovka, Gubkinsky District, Belgorod Oblast, a selo in Gubkinsky District of Belgorod Oblast
- Bogoslovka, Krasnensky District, Belgorod Oblast, a selo in Gorkinsky Rural Okrug of Krasnensky District in Belgorod Oblast
- Bogoslovka, Republic of Khakassia, a village under the administrative jurisdiction of the Town of Sayanogorsk in the Republic of Khakassia
- Bogoslovka, Kursk Oblast, a village in Klevensky Selsoviet of Khomutovsky District in Kursk Oblast
- Bogoslovka, Nizhny Novgorod Oblast, a village in Volzhsky Selsoviet of Sokolsky District in Nizhny Novgorod Oblast
- Bogoslovka, Karasuksky District, Novosibirsk Oblast, a selo in Karasuksky District of Novosibirsk Oblast
- Bogoslovka, Ust-Tarksky District, Novosibirsk Oblast, a village in Ust-Tarksky District of Novosibirsk Oblast
- Bogoslovka, Nazyvayevsky District, Omsk Oblast, a village in Muravyevsky Rural Okrug of Nazyvayevsky District in Omsk Oblast
- Bogoslovka, Omsky District, Omsk Oblast, a selo in Bogoslovsky Rural Okrug of Omsky District in Omsk Oblast
- Bogoslovka, Penza Oblast, a selo in Bogoslovsky Selsoviet of Penzensky District in Penza Oblast
- Bogoslovka, Rybnovsky District, Ryazan Oblast, a village in Pionersky Rural Okrug of Rybnovsky District in Ryazan Oblast
- Bogoslovka, Shatsky District, Ryazan Oblast, a village in Raypolsky Rural Okrug of Shatsky District in Ryazan Oblast
- Bogoslovka, Rasskazovsky District, Tambov Oblast, a selo in Ozersky Selsoviet of Rasskazovsky District in Tambov Oblast
- Bogoslovka, Tambovsky District, Tambov Oblast, a selo in Bogoslovsky Selsoviet of Tambovsky District in Tambov Oblast
- Bogoslovka, Tomsk Oblast, a selo in Zyryansky District of Tomsk Oblast
- Bogoslovka, Tula Oblast, a selo in Novopetrovsky Rural Okrug of Kamensky District in Tula Oblast
- Bogoslovka, Voronezh Oblast, a selo in Verkhnekhavskoye Rural Settlement of Verkhnekhavsky District in Voronezh Oblast
- Bogoslovka, Yaroslavl Oblast, a village in Levtsovsky Rural Okrug of Yaroslavsky District in Yaroslavl Oblast

== Alternative names ==
- Bogoslovka, alternative name of Sverdlovskoye, a selo in Sverdlovsky Selsoviet of Khabarsky District in Altai Krai; 53°19′N 79°40′E
