= Zlatoutovsk =

Zlatoutovsk Златоустовск
- Settlement
- Location within Amur Oblast Location within Russia
- Coordinates: 52°58′N 133°35′E
- Country: Russia
- Region: Amur Oblast
- District: Selemdzhinsky District
- Time zone: UTC+9:00

Zlatoutovsk (Russian: Златоустовск) is a settlement (from 1942-2010 an urban-type settlement) in the Selemdzhinsky District of the Amur Oblast of Russia. It is the administrative center of the Zlatoust rural settlement.

Zlatoustovsk is located on the right bank of the Kharga River (a left tributary of the Selemdzha), 80 kilometres east of the district center of Ekimchan. The nearest railway station is 250 kilometres away in Fevralsk.

== History ==
The settlement was first mentioned in 1891. It was founded by Pavel Vasilyevich Mordin as the Zhedrinsky mine.

It had the status of an urban-type settlement from 1942 until 2010. In 2010 it was recatergorised as a rural settlement.

== Population ==
As of the 2021 Russian census, there were 639 people living in Zlatoutovsk - 318 men and 321 women.

== Economy ==
There are two gold mining companies (Khargu CJSC, Albynsky Mine LLC) as well as a power plant.

== Culture ==
There is a House of Culture in the town.
