= Byssa =

Byssa Бысса
- Selo
- Location within Amur Oblast Location within Russia
- Coordinates: 52°24′N 130°31′E
- Country: Russia
- Region: Amur Oblast
- District: Selemdzhinsky District
- Time zone: UTC+9:00

Byssa (Russian: Бысса) is a rural locality (a selo) in Norsky Selsoviet of Selemdzhinsky District, Amur Oblast, Russia. The population was 39 as of 2018.

== Geography ==
Byssa is located on the left bank of the Selemdzha, at the confluence with its left tributary the Byssa river, 241 km southwest of Ekimchan (the district's administrative centre) by road. Fevralsk is the nearest rural locality.
