= Slava, Amur Oblast =

Slava Слава
- Selo
- Location within Amur Oblast Location within Russia
- Coordinates: 52°08′N 129°25′E
- Country: Russia
- Region: Amur Oblast
- District: Mazanovsky District
- Time zone: UTC+9:00

Slava (Russian: Слава) is a rural locality (a selo) in Novorossiysky Selsoviet of Mazanovsky District, Amur Oblast, Russia. The population was 1 as of 2018. There is 1 street.

== Geography ==
Slava is located on the left bank of the Orlovka (Mamyn) river, near its confluence with the Selemdzha, 79 km (49 mi) northeast of Novokiyevsky Uval (the district's administrative centre) by road.
