= Selemdzhinsk =

Selemdzhinsk Селемджинск
- Settlement
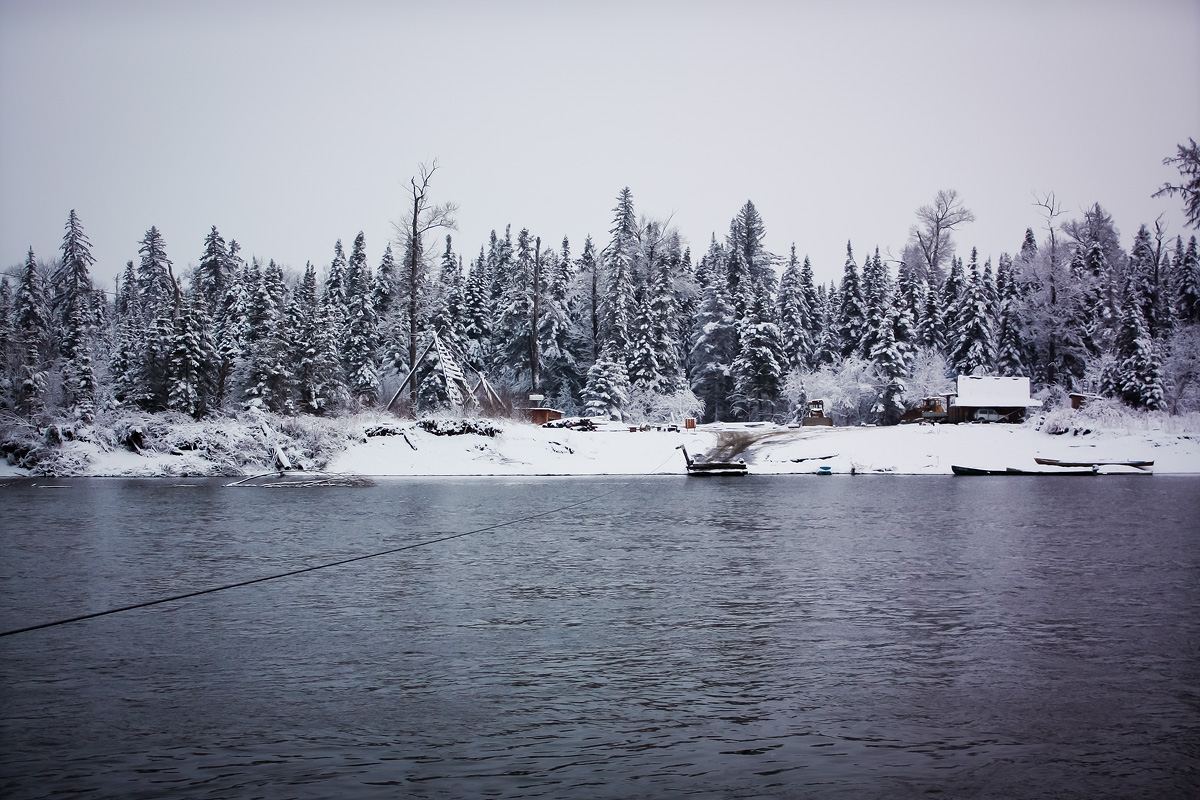
- Ferry crossing at Selemdzhinsk

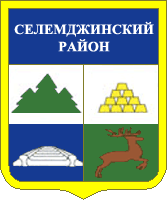
- Flag Seal

- Location within Amur Oblast Location within Russia
- Coordinates: 52°34′N 131°07′E
- Country: Russia
- Region: Amur Oblast
- District: Selemdzhinsky District
- Time zone: UTC+9:00

Selemdzhinsk (Russian: Селемджинск) is a rural locality (a settlement) in Stoybinsky Selsoviet of Selemdzhinsky District, Amur Oblast, Russia. The population was 22 as of 2018.

== Geography ==
Selemdzhinsk is located on the right bank of the Selemdzha River, 180 km southwest of Ekimchan (the district's administrative centre) by road. Fevralskoye is the nearest rural locality.
