= Uglovoye =

Uglovoye Угловое
- Selo
- Location within Amur Oblast Location within Russia
- Coordinates: 51°56′N 129°21′E
- Country: Russia
- Region: Amur Oblast
- District: Mazanovsky District
- Time zone: UTC+9:00

Uglovoye (Russian: Угловое) is a rural locality (a selo) and the administrative center of Uglovskiy Selsoviet of Mazanovsky District, Amur Oblast, Russia. The population was 530 as of 2018. There are 24 streets.

== Geography ==
Uglovoye is located on the left bank of the Selemdzha River, 6 kilometres (3.7 mi) upstream from the confluence of the Ulma, and 49 kilometres (30 mi) northeast of Novokiyevsky Uval (the district's administrative centre) by road. Bogoslovka is the nearest rural locality.
