= Pionersky, Amur Oblast =

Pionersky Пионерский
- Settlement
- Location within Amur Oblast Location within Russia
- Coordinates: 51°42′N 128°57′E
- Country: Russia
- Region: Amur Oblast
- District: Mazanovsky District
- Time zone: UTC+9:00

Pionersky (Russian: Пионерский) is a rural locality (a settlement) in Novokiyevsky Selsoviet of Mazanovsky District, Amur Oblast, Russia. The population was 281 as of 2018. There are 5 streets.

== Geography ==
Pionersky is located 8 km north of Novokiyevsky Uval (the district's administrative centre) by road. Novokiyevka is the nearest rural locality.
