= Bogoslovka, Mazanovsky District, Amur Oblast =

Bogoslovka Богословка
- Selo
- Location within Amur Oblast Location within Russia
- Coordinates: 51°52′N 129°14′E
- Country: Russia
- Region: Amur Oblast
- District: Mazanovsky District
- Time zone: UTC+9:00

Bogoslovka (Russian: Богословка) is a rural locality (a selo) and the administrative center of Bogoslovsky Selsoviet of Mazanovsky District, Amur Oblast, Russia. The population was 235 as of 2018. There are 4 streets.

== Geography ==
Bogoslovka is located on the left bank of the Selemdzha River, 8 kilometres (5.0 mi) downstream from the confluence of the Ulma, and 40 kilometres (25 mi) northeast of Novokiyevsky Uval (the district's administrative centre) by road. Kozlovka is the nearest rural locality.
