= Abaykan =

Abaykan Абайкан
- Selo
- Location within Amur Oblast Location within Russia
- Coordinates: 52°1′N 129°26′E
- Country: Russia
- Region: Amur Oblast
- District: Mazanovsky District
- Time zone: UTC+9:00

Abaykan (Russian: Абайкан) is a rural locality (a selo) in Uglovsky Selsoviet of Mazanovsky District, Russia. The population was 4 as of 2018. There are 4 streets.

== Geography ==
Abaykan is located on the left bank of the Selemdzha River, near the mouths of the Orlovka (Mamyn), 62 km (39 mi) northeast of Novokiyevsky Uval (the district's administrative centre) by road. Uglovoye is the nearest rural locality.

== History ==
The village was established in 1909.
