= Petrovka, Amur Oblast =

Petrovka Петровка
- Selo
- Location within Amur Oblast Location within Russia
- Coordinates: 51°29′N 128°35′E
- Country: Russia
- Region: Amur Oblast
- District: Mazanovsky District
- Time zone: UTC+9:00

Petrovka (Russian: Петровка) is a rural locality (a selo) in Krasnoyarovsky Selsoviet of Mazanovsky District, Amur Oblast, Russia. The population was 119 as of 2018. There are 2 streets.

== Geography ==
Petrovka is located on the right bank of the Birma River, 32 km southwest of Novokiyevsky Uval (the district's administrative centre) by road. Antonovka is the nearest rural locality.
