= Sapronovo =

Sapronovo Сапроново
- Selo
- Location within Amur Oblast Location within Russia
- Coordinates: 51°24′N 128°51′E
- Country: Russia
- Region: Amur Oblast
- District: Mazanovsky District
- Time zone: UTC+9:00

Sapronovo (Russian: Сапроново) is a rural locality (a selo) and the administrative center of Sapronovsky Selsoviet of Mazanovsky District, Amur Oblast, Russia. The population was 544 as of 2018. There are 17 streets.

== Geography ==
Sapronovo is located on the right bank of the Birma River, 35 km south of Novokiyevsky Uval (the district's administrative centre) by road. Bichura is the nearest rural locality.
