= Molchanovo =

Molchanovo (Russian: Молчаново) is the name of several rural localities in Russia:

- Molchanovo, Amur Oblast, a selo in Molchanovsky Rural Settlement of Mazanovsky District of Amur Oblast
- Molchanovo, Bryansk Oblast, a village in Kotlyakovsky Selsoviet of Trubchevsky District of Bryansk Oblast
- Molchanovo, Kostroma Oblast, a village in Sandogorskoye Settlement of Kostromskoy District of Kostroma Oblast
- Molchanovo, Republic of Mordovia, a village in Starodevichensky Selsoviet of Yelnikovsky District of the Republic of Mordovia
- Molchanovo, Bolsheboldinsky District, Nizhny Novgorod Oblast, a selo in Molchanovsky Selsoviet of Bolsheboldinsky District of Nizhny Novgorod Oblast
- Molchanovo, Sokolsky District, Nizhny Novgorod Oblast, a village in Loyminsky Selsoviet of Sokolsky District of Nizhny Novgorod Oblast
- Molchanovo, Novgorod Oblast, a village in Seleyevskoye Settlement of Poddorsky District of Novgorod Oblast
- Molchanovo, Novorzhevsky District, Pskov Oblast, a village in Novorzhevsky District, Pskov Oblast
- Molchanovo, Pushkinogorsky District, Pskov Oblast, a village in Pushkinogorsky District, Pskov Oblast
- Molchanovo, Saratov Oblast, a village in Rtishchevsky District of Saratov Oblast
- Molchanovo, Tomsk Oblast, a selo in Molchanovsky District of Tomsk Oblast
- Molchanovo, Kamensky District, Tula Oblast, a settlement in Molchanovsky Rural Okrug of Kamensky District of Tula Oblast
- Molchanovo, Kimovsky District, Tula Oblast, a village in Rozhdestvensky Rural Okrug of Kimovsky District of Tula Oblast
- Molchanovo, Zaoksky District, Tula Oblast, a village in Dmitriyevsky Rural Okrug of Zaoksky District of Tula Oblast
- Molchanovo, Bologovsky District, Tver Oblast, a village in Vypolzovskoye Rural Settlement of Bologovsky District of Tver Oblast
- Molchanovo, Kalyazinsky District, Tver Oblast, a village in Semendyayevskoye Rural Settlement of Kalyazinsky District of Tver Oblast
- Molchanovo, Maksatikhinsky District, Tver Oblast, a village in Truzhenitskoye Rural Settlement of Maksatikhinsky District of Tver Oblast
- Molchanovo, Voronezh Oblast, a khutor in Trekhstenskoye Rural Settlement of Kamensky District of Voronezh Oblast
- Molchanovo, Yaroslavl Oblast, a village in Toropovsky Rural Okrug of Danilovsky District of Yaroslavl Oblast
