= Kanichi, Amur Oblast =

Kanichi Каничи
- Selo
- Location within Amur Oblast Location within Russia
- Coordinates: 51°20′N 128°58′E
- Country: Russia
- Region: Amur Oblast
- District: Mazanovsky District
- Time zone: UTC+9:00

Kanichi (Russian: Каничи) is a rural locality (a selo) in Dmitriyevsky Selsoviet of Mazanovsky District, Amur Oblast, Russia. The population was 58 as of 2018. There is 1 street.

== Geography ==
Kanichi is located on the left bank of the Birma River, 49 km south of Novokiyevsky Uval (the district's administrative centre) by road. Dmitriyevka is the nearest rural locality.
