= Ulma, Amur Oblast =

Ulma Ульма
- Selo
- Location within Amur Oblast Location within Russia
- Coordinates: 51°56′N 129°35′E
- Country: Russia
- Region: Amur Oblast
- District: Mazanovsky District
- Time zone: UTC+9:00

Ulma (Russian: Ульма) is a rural locality (a selo) in Uglovskiy Selsoviet of Mazanovsky District, Amur Oblast, Russia. The population was 116 as of 2018. There are 8 streets.

== Geography ==
Ulma is located on the left bank of the Ulma River, 62 km northwest of Novokiyevsky Uval (the district's administrative centre) by road. Uglovoye is the nearest rural locality.
