= Romankautsy =

Romankautsy Романкауцы
- Selo
- Location within Amur Oblast Location within Russia
- Coordinates: 51°32′N 129°03′E
- Country: Russia
- Region: Amur Oblast
- District: Mazanovsky District
- Time zone: UTC+9:00

Romankautsy (Russian: Романкауцы) is a rural locality (a selo) in Novokiyevsky Selsoviet of Mazanovsky District, Amur Oblast, Russia. The population was 142 as of 2018. There are 4 streets.

== Geography ==
Romankautsy is located on the left bank of the Kamushka River, 26 km southeast of Novokiyevsky Uval (the district's administrative centre) by road. Razdolnoye is the nearest rural locality.
