= Tourism in Khabarovsk Krai =

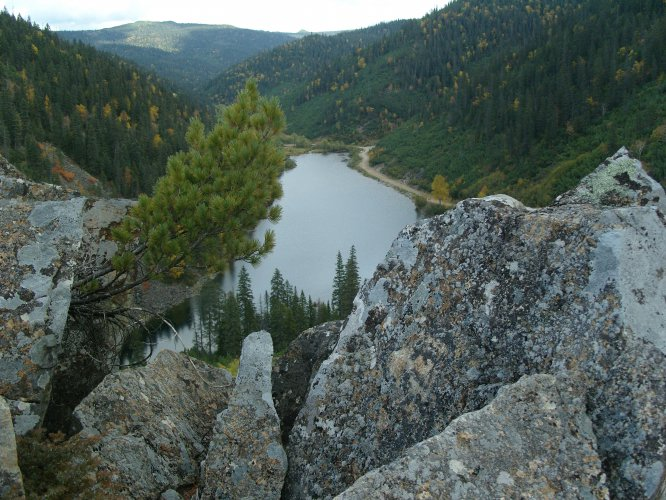
The lake Amut near Komsomolsk-on-Amur

Tourism in Khabarovsk Krai is dominated by outbound tourism rather than inbound one. Domestic tourist resources are basically nature related. The territory is located in the Far East of Russia and boasts one of the major attraction — the Amur river, one of the longest in the world. In the Northern hemisphere the river numbers a variety of animal and fish species second only to the Mississippi.

== Introduction ==
=== Tourist seasons ===
Climate Khabarovsk Krai - monsoon. It is characterized by cold winters with little snow and wet hot summer. This is due to the fact that the winter winds that blow from the mainland, bringing dry air and winds from the Pacific Ocean in the summer - rainfall.

=== Water tourism ===
The region is carried out both in the form of extreme sport alloys, as well as in the form of hunting, fishing and eco-tourism; more often they are combined. The most popular rafting on mountain rivers (chorus, Anuy, Gur, Tumnin, Coppi, Niemann, Akishma, Yaurin, Tuyun, Amgun et al.). For sports alloys used Bureya River Basin: Yaurin, Niemann, Akishma Tuyun and its many rapids, Shiver, rocky clamps, corridors.

=== Fishing ===
The objects of sport fishing are also: Dolly Varden, char, chum, Sim, salmon, coho salmon.

=== Rafting ===
In Khabarovsk territory takes one of the great rivers of the world - the Amur, which is a tourist attraction in the region.

=== Ecotourism ===
Rich natural potential of the region provides endless opportunities for the development of eco-tourism. For the Khabarovsk Territory is characterized by a mixture of northern and southern species of flora and fauna. On the territory of the region you can see reindeer, brown and Himalayan bears, bighorn sheep, as well as the Siberian tigers.

=== Hiking and ski routes ===
The hiking and ski routes in the mountains: Badzhal Range (here more than twenty peaks exceed the height of 2000 m), Sikhote-Alin (Highest point Tordoki-Yani) Myaochanu, Dusse-Alin and Yam-Alin.

=== Caves ===
The cave "Farewell" in Imeni Lazo District.

=== Mountaineering ===
For this type of tourism attractive Badzhal, Tatar Strait coast of the Sea of Okhotsk (particularly the section from Kiruna to Ayana).

=== Dusse-Alin ===
The route passes through the territory of the state Bureya Nature Reserve. group often accompanied by rangers of the reserve and the instructor of sports and tourist associations of the region.

=== Suntar-Khayata Range ===
Located on the border of Yakutia and the Khabarovsk Territory.

=== mountain tourism ===
The main bases of the ski edges are the base of "Spartacus", "Dersu" near Khabarovsk, "Holdomi" and "Amut Snouleyk" at the Komsomolsk-on-Amur.

=== Ethnographical tours ===
Settlements of indigenous peoples are spots of interest.

=== festivals and events ===
international festival of military bands of the Asia-Pacific region "Amur wave" (end of May - beginning of June).

=== Cultural and educational tourism ===
The convenient geographical location of Khabarovsk, close proximity to Asia-Pacific countries, the existing tourism infrastructure, as well as features of the cultural-historical and natural tourist potential are the basis for active development of cultural tourism in the Khabarovsk Territory.

=== Ski resorts ===
"Holdomi" and "Amut Snow lake" near Komsomolsk.

== Seven Wonders of the Khabarovsk Territory ==
Held in 2009 voting shares in the "Seven Wonders of the Khabarovsk Territory" has found the edge of the main attractions in the opinion of its inhabitants. Siberian tiger, The mountain Dusse Alin, Shantar Islands, Lake Amut, Khabarovsk Bridge, Nelumboflowers, Petroglyphs of Sikachi-Alyan

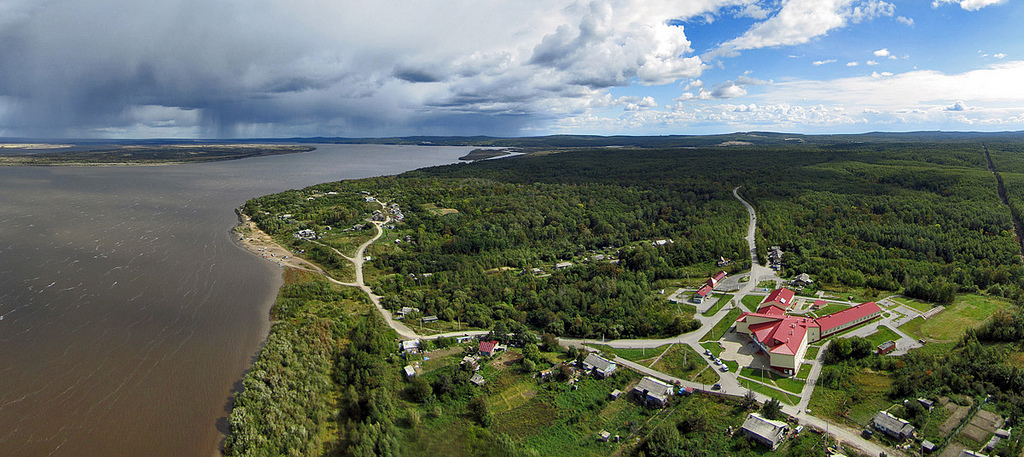
Sikachi-Alyan from a bird's eye view

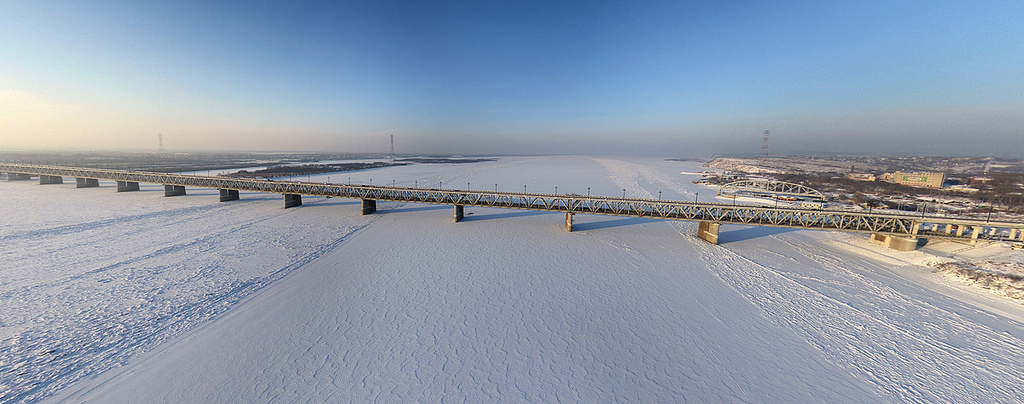
Bridge over the Amur River in Khabarovsk

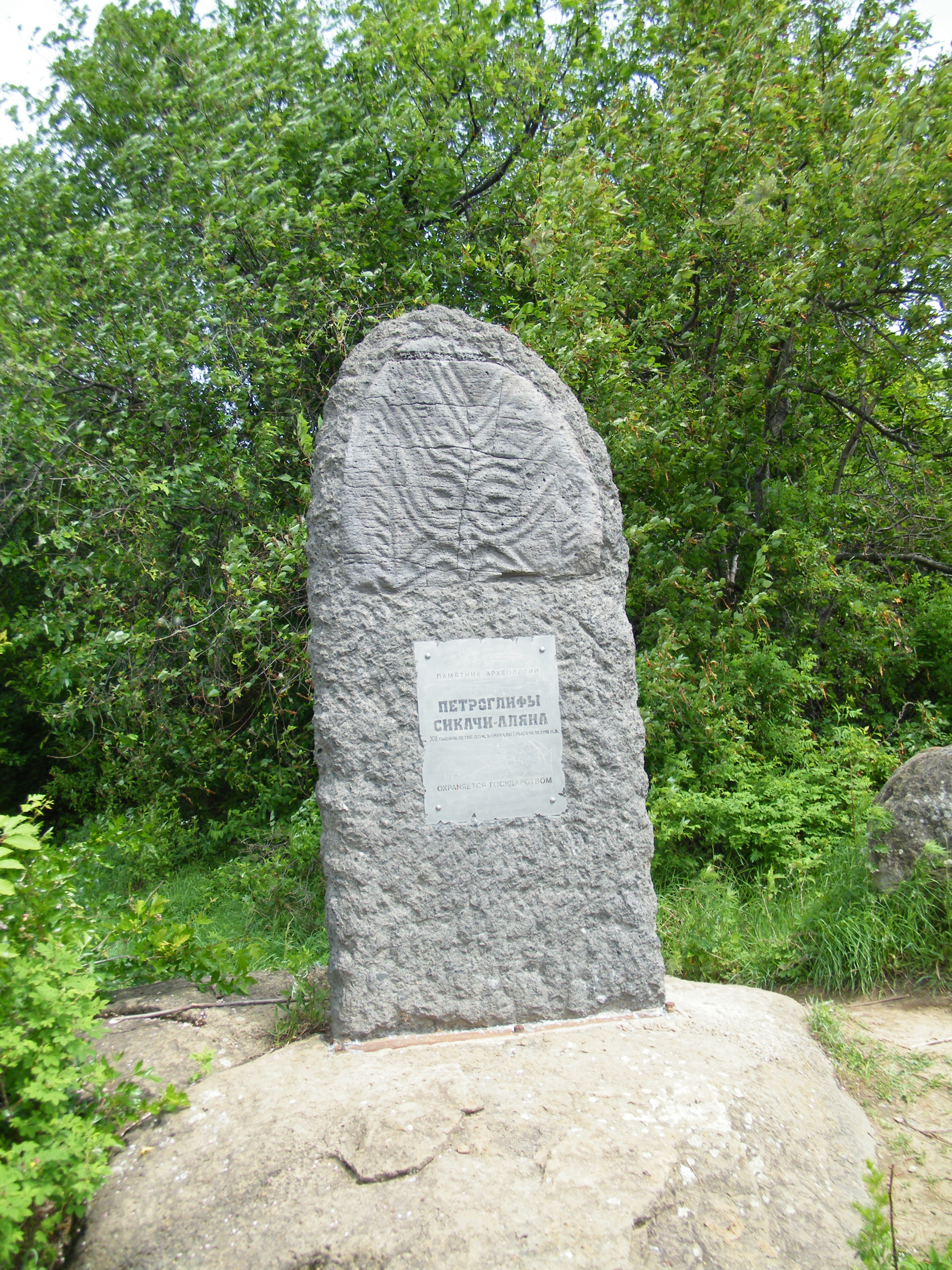
Petroglyphs of Sikachi-Alyan

== Statistics ==
In 2009, the tourist infrastructure Territory consisted of 145 collective accommodation facilities are 129 hotels.

== Sources ==
- Khabarovsk Krai. Tour guide. — Priamurskie vedomosti. 2003. ISBN 5-8003-0093-3.

== See also ==
- Tourism in Russia
