= Fevralsk =

Fevralsk Февральск
- work settlement
- Interactive map of Fevralsk
- Location of Fevralsk Fevralsk (Amur Oblast)
- Coordinates: 52°27′07″N 130°53′10″E
- Country: Russia
- Federal subject: Amur Oblast
- Administrative district: Selemdzhinsky District
- Founded: 1896

Population (2010 Census)
  - Total: 5,128
  - Estimate (2025): 3,537 (−31%)

Municipal status
  - Municipal district: Selemdzhinsky Municipal District
  - Urban settlement: Work Settlement Fevralsk Urban Settlement
  - Capital of: Work Settlement Fevralsk Urban Settlement
- Time zone: UTC+9 (MSK+6)
- Postal code: 676572
- OKTMO ID: 10645189051

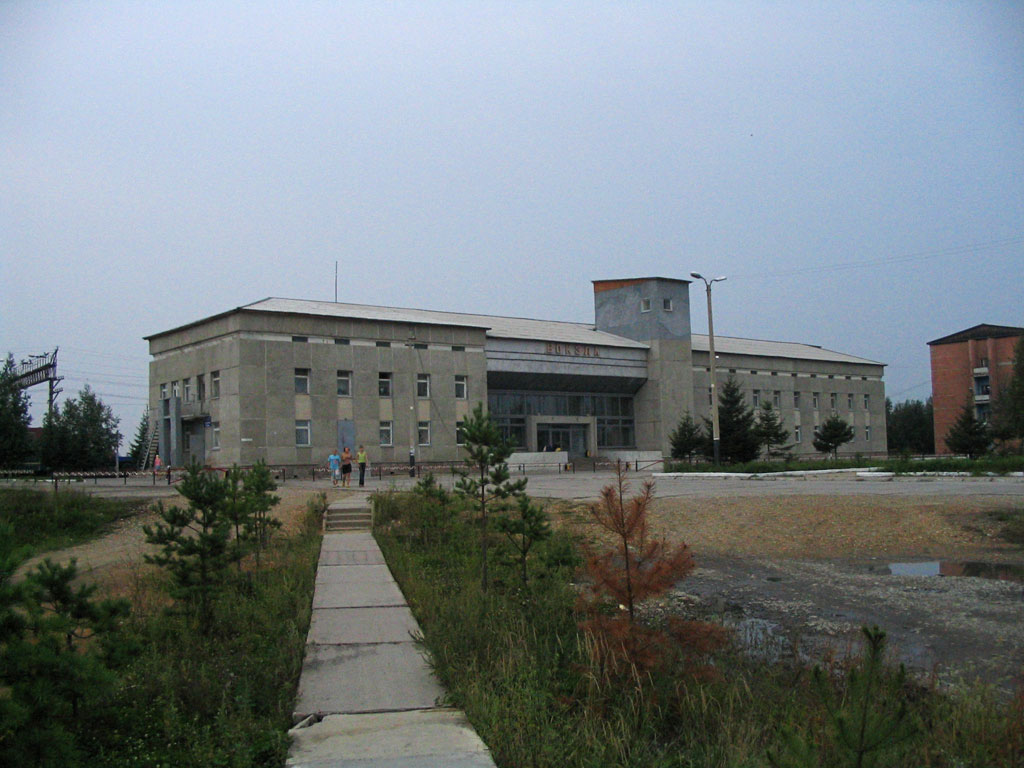
Fevralsk railway station

Fevralsk (Russian: Февра́льск) is an urban locality (a work settlement) in Selemdzhinsky District of Amur Oblast, Russia, located between the Selemdzha River and its tributary the Byssa, about 340 kilometers (210 mi) northeast of Blagoveshchensk, the oblast's administrative center, and 204 kilometers (127 mi) southwest of Ekimchan, the administrative center of the district. Population: 5,128 (2010 census); 4,690 (2002 census); 8,816 (1989 Soviet census).

== History ==
The village of Fevralskoye (Russian: Февра́льское) was founded in February 1896 by settlers from Central Russia; the name was derived from the Russian word "февраль" (fevral), meaning "February".

In 1974, the village became one of the most important support bases for construction of the Baikal-Amur Mainline (BAM). The station and the settlement were built by workers from Krasnoyarsk Krai; as part of the construction of the BAM, various sections and towns along the route were placed under the patronage of Komsomol brigades from different parts of the Soviet Union. Also some military divisions like DIVISION 21006 was situated at this town, when they were here, there almost was no houses in the soviet times. Biggest building was at 1978-1984.

In 1982, the village was given its current name and was granted urban-type settlement status. Regular rail traffic on the BAM section from Tynda to Komsomolsk-on-Amur began in 1989. Many inhabitants left the settlement after completion of the rail line. However, in contrast to most other settlements along the BAM, the population has once again begun to increase, with a population of 4,904 according to the 2006 estimates.

== Economy ==
Logging is conducted in the area around Fevralsk, mainly for export to nearby China.

=== Transportation ===
Fevralsk is an important station on the BAM, located 3,017 kilometers (1,875 mi) from Tayshet, and is the biggest settlement on the over 1,000 km-long section between Tynda and Novy Urgal. The rail line crosses the Selemdzha and the Byssa Rivers close to the settlement, over two bridges which are, respectively, 700-meter (2,300 ft) and 200-meter (660 ft) long. A 144-kilometer (89 mi) long branch line is being built north to the Ogodzha coal fields.
