= Tokur, Russia =

Coordinates: 53°08′N 132°53′E

Tokur (Russian: Токур) is an urban locality (a work settlement) in Selemdzhinsky District of Amur Oblast, Russia. Population: 1,091 (2010 census); 1,171 (2002 census); 2,452 (1989 Soviet census).

== Geography ==
The settlement is located in the area of the Selemdzha Range.
