= Gorod-Makit =

Mountain in Amur Oblast, Russia

Gorod-Makit Город-Макит
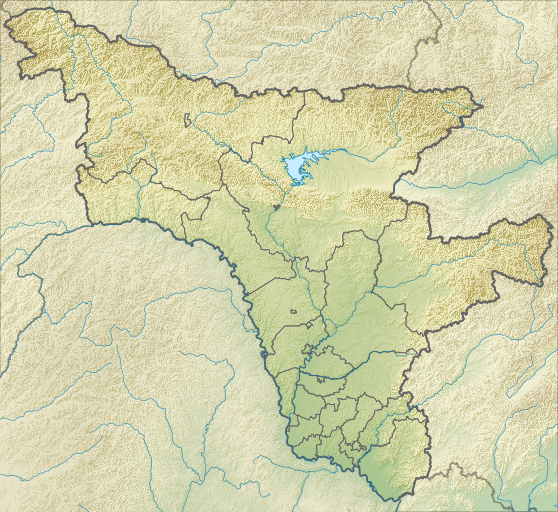
- Location within Amur Oblast

Highest point
- Elevation: 2,298 m (7,539 ft)
- Prominence: 1,141 m (3,743 ft)
- Listing: Ribu
- Coordinates: 52°57′07″N 134°39′26″E

Geography
- Location: Amur Oblast, Russia
- Parent range: Yam-Alin

Climbing
- Easiest route: From Ekimchan

Gorod-Makit (Russian: Город-Макит) is a mountain in Amur Oblast, Russian Far East. At 2,298 m (7,539 ft) it is the highest summit in the Yam-Alin.

Gorod-Makit rises close to the Khabarovsk Krai border, about 73 kilometres (45 mi) SSW of the highest point of the contiguous Taikan Range.

The nearest airport is Ekimchan Airport.

== See also ==
- Highest points of Russian Federal subjects
- List of mountains and hills of Russia
