= Putyatino, Amur Oblast =

Putyatino Путятино
- Selo
- Location within Amur Oblast Location within Russia
- Coordinates: 51°45′N 129°03′E
- Country: Russia
- Region: Amur Oblast
- District: Mazanovsky District
- Time zone: UTC+9:00

Putyatino (Russian: Путятино) is a rural locality (a selo) and the administrative center of Putyatinsky Selsoviet of Mazanovsky District, Amur Oblast, Russia. The population was 265 as of 2018. There are 13 streets.

== Geography ==
Putyatino is located on the left bank of the Selemdzha River, 16 km northeast of Novokiyevsky Uval (the district's administrative centre) by road. Taskino is the nearest rural locality.
