= Putyatinsky =

Putyatinsky (masculine), Putyatinskaya (feminine), or Putyatinskoye (neuter) may refer to:

- Putyatinsky District, a district of Ryazan Oblast, Russia
- Putyatinsky (rural locality), a rural locality (a settlement) in Kemerovo Oblast, Russia
- Putyatinskaya, a rural locality (a village) in Arkhangelsk Oblast, Russia
