= Stoyba =

Stoyba Стойба
- Selo
- Location within Amur Oblast Location within Russia
- Coordinates: 52°47′N 131°42′E
- Country: Russia
- Region: Amur Oblast
- District: Selemdzhinsky District
- Time zone: UTC+9:00

Stoyba (Russian: Стойба) is a rural locality (a selo) in Selemdzhinsky District, Amur Oblast, Russia. The population was 687 as of 2018. There are 20 streets.

== Geography ==
Stoyba is located 113 km southwest of Ekimchan (the district's administrative centre) by road. Selemdzhinsk is the nearest rural locality.
