= Bureya Nature Reserve =

Nature reserve in Khabarovsk Krai, Russia

- Russian: Буреинский заповедник (Bureinsky Zapovednik)
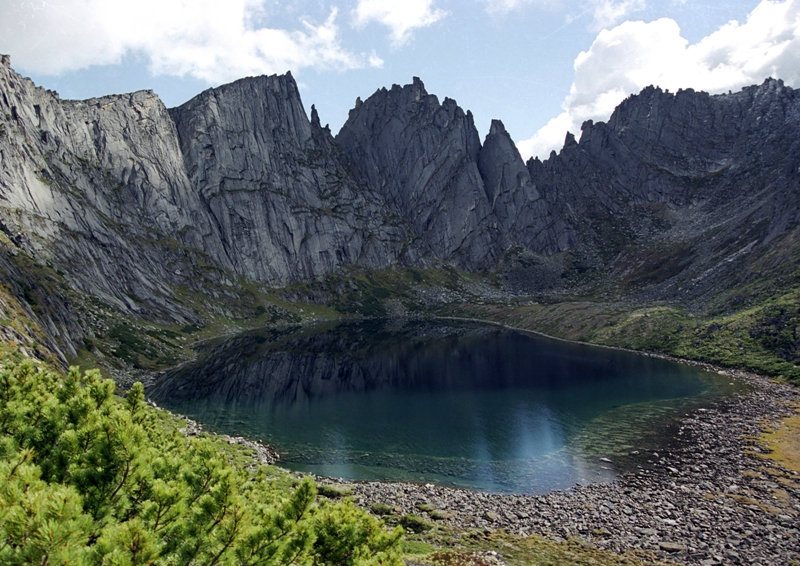
- Bear Lake, Bureya Zapovednik

- Location within Russia
- Location: Dusse-Alin, Khabarovsk Krai
- Nearest city: Khabarovsk
- Coordinates: 51°55′46″N 134°35′44″E
- Area: 358,444 hectares (885,734 acres; 1,384 sq mi)
- Established: 1987
- Governing body: Ministry of Natural Resources and Environment (Russia)
- Website: https://zapbureya.ru/

Bureya Nature Reserve (Russian: Буреинский заповедник) is a protected area (Zapovednik) about 200 km northwest of the city of Khabarovsk, in the Verkhnebureinsky District of Khabarovsk Krai, in the Russian Far East. The territory is one of mountain tundra, rivers and lakes, and taiga forests. It includes the headwaters of the left and right tributaries of the Bureya River, part of the lower Amur River basin. The reserve was created in 1987, and covers an area of 358,444 ha (1,383.96 sq mi).

== Topography ==
The Bureya Reserve covers the Left Bureya and Right Bureya River, which combine into the Bureya River as it flows south into the Amur River. It is located in the central and southern part of the Dusse-Alin. The area is surrounded by mountain ranges - the Ezop Range to the northwest, the Yam-Alin to the north and the Bureya Range to the south. The mountains in the reserve itself range in height from 550 metres (1,800 ft) to 2,241 metres (7,352 ft), and because the reserve sits at the meeting points of several faults. The tops of the river valleys are often convex-shaped bald mountains.

The headwaters of many streams are glacial cirques, and lower levels along the rivers feature floodplains and lakes; in between the river valleys are generally too steep for terraces and the tributaries of the Bureya are often in rapids. Because the winters are relatively dry, the Spring floods are small; the summer floods are larger due to the seasonal rains. The reserve is remote: the closest town, Sophisk, is 40 km west of the border. There are no roads in the reserve.

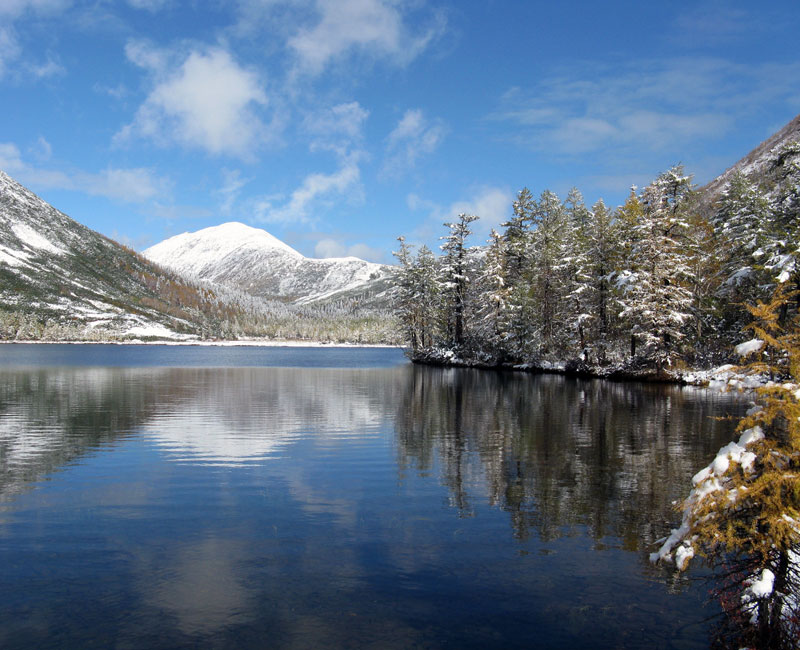
Lake Korbohon

== Climate and Ecoregion ==
Bureya is the largest protected area in the "Okhotsk-Manchurian taiga" ecoregion. This region of coniferous taiga is at the northernmost extent of Manchurian flora communities, while also supporting the southwestern range of Okhostsk-Kamchatka/Beringia communities. It is affected by the climatic influence of the Pacific Ocean, which causes warmer winters and cooler summers than areas further from the ocean. The reserve is important for large mammals including bear, wolverine and sable.

Bureya has a subarctic climate (Köppen climate classification Dwc). characterized by cool summers, and very dry cold winters, moderated slightly in the case of Bureya by the relative proximity of the ocean.

== Flora and fauna ==
The Bureya Reserve has never been subject to the commercial harvesting of timber; any clearing of tree cover has come from natural causes (fires, landslides). The peaks are bare rock with lichen, below that is a zone of alpine meadows. Below 1,100 meters the forest zone begins; the middle slopes are covered with larch forests, spruce-fir forests, thickets of cedar, and on the lowest level there are floodplain intra-zonal forests. The animals are represented by the typical Okhotsk-Kamchatka forest species, including brown bear, ermine, sable, hare, squirrel, and wolverine. Upper elevations feature alpine species such as ptarmigan and pika. The reserve has recorded 190 species of birds, with 89 known to nest in the territory.

== Management ==
The reserve has a visitor center and nature museum open to the public. The park sponsors 3-hour helicopter tours of the territory, rafting trips on the Right Bureya River, and allows limited access to three hiking trails in supervised groups with permits. The hiking trails are to notable sights - Bear Lake, Lake Korbohon, "The Kings Highway", and waterfalls of the Kuraygagna River.

== See also ==
- National parks of Russia
- Nature reserves of Russia ('zapovedniks')
- Protected areas of Russia
