= Koboldo =

Koboldo Коболдо
- Selo
- Location within Amur Oblast Location within Russia
- Coordinates: 52°57′N 132°43′E
- Country: Russia
- Region: Amur Oblast
- District: Selemdzhinsky District
- Time zone: UTC+9:00

Koboldo (Russian: Коболдо) is a rural locality (a selo) in Koboldinsky Selsoviet of Selemdzhinsky District, Amur Oblast, Russia. The population was 378 as of 2018. There are 15 streets.

== Geography ==
Koboldo is located on the right bank of the Selemdzha River, 41 km southwest of Ekimchan (the district's administrative centre) by road.
