= Molchanovo, Amur Oblast =

Molchanovo Молчаново
- Selo
- Location within Amur Oblast Location within Russia
- Coordinates: 51°22′N 128°20′E
- Country: Russia
- Region: Amur Oblast
- District: Mazanovsky District
- Time zone: UTC+9:00

Molchanovo (Russian: Молчаново) is a rural locality (a selo) and the administrative center of Molchanovsky Selsoviet of Mazanovsky District, Amur Oblast, Russia. The population was 106 as of 2018. There are 7 streets.

== Geography ==
Molchanovo is located on the left bank of the Zeya River, 56 km southwest of Novokiyevsky Uval (the district's administrative centre) by road. Popovka is the nearest rural locality.
