= Ulma (river) =

Ulma Ульма
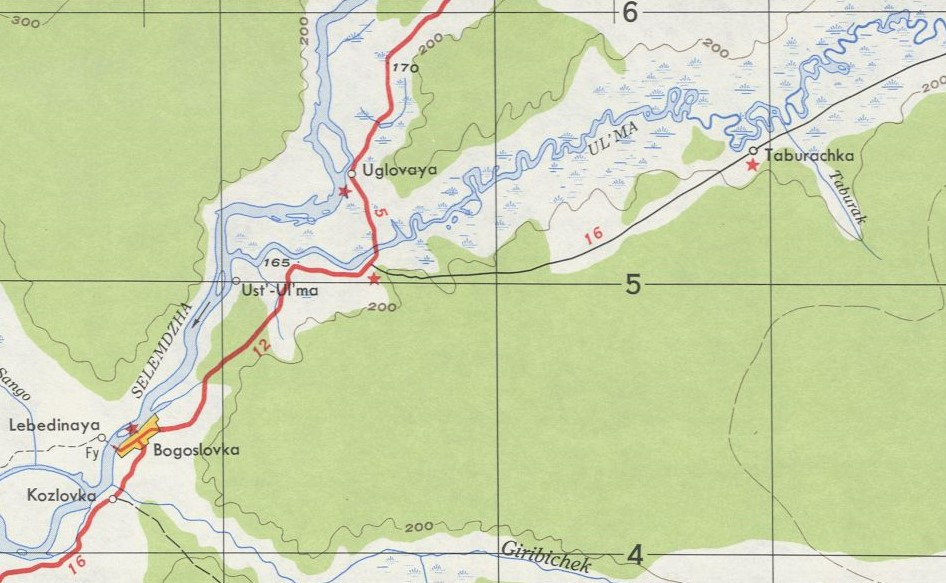
- Selemdzha and Ulma river confluence map section

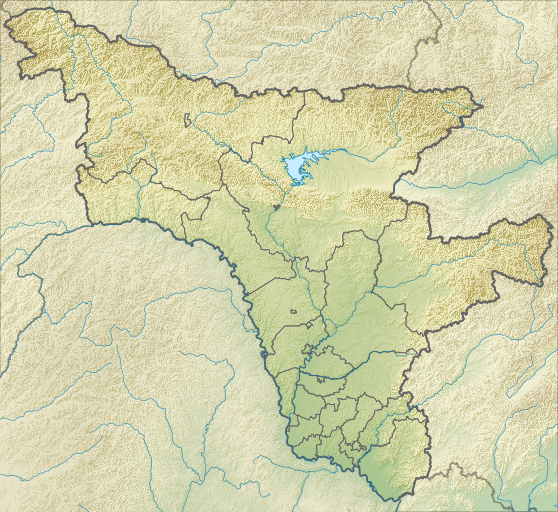
- Mouth location in Amur Oblast, Russia

Location
- Country: Russia

Physical characteristics
- Source
  - location: Turan Range
  - coordinates: 51°33′44″N 131°17′06″E
  - elevation: 480 m (1,570 ft)
- Mouth: Selemdzha
  - location: Between Uglovoye and Bogoslovka
  - coordinates: 51°55′05″N 129°17′01″E
  - elevation: 171 m (561 ft)
- Length: 346 km (215 mi)
- Basin size: 5,550 km^{2} (2,140 sq mi)

Basin features
- Progression: Selemdzha → Zeya→ Amur→ Sea of Okhotsk

The Ulma (Russian: Ульма) is a river in Mazanovsky District, Amur Oblast, Russia. It is the longest tributary of the Selemdzha, with a length of 346 kilometres (215 mi) and with 5,550 square kilometres (2,140 mi^{2}) the fourth in drainage basin area, after the Orlovka and Byssa.

The river flows across a largely uninhabited area except for Ulma village on its banks. It is a rafting and fishing destination.

== History ==
Pottery fragments belonging to the Paleolithic Selemdzha culture (SLM) were found at the archaeological site Ust-Ulma-1 by the river. Organic content in a potsherd found at the site was dated back to between 8,900 and 12,590 years ago.

In 1981, the Ulma Zakaznik (Ульминский заказник), a protected area of 189,100 hectares (467,000 acres), was established in the middle basin of the river.

== Course ==
The Ulma is a left tributary of the Selemdzha. It has its origin at the confluence of the Right Ulma and Left Ulma (Bordak) in the western slopes of the Turan Range. The river flows fast in a roughly southwestern direction in its upper reaches. In its middle and lower course it first flows northwestwards and then westwards, meandering across a very marshy floodplain dotted with small lakes and oxbows. Finally it meets the left bank of the Selemdzha 48 kilometres (30 mi) from its mouth in the Zeya, 6 kilometres (3.7 mi) downstream from Uglovoye and 8 kilometres (5.0 mi) upstream from the village of Bogoslovka.

The Ulma river basin is mainly rain-fed and the spring-summer period accounts for up to 90% of the annual water runoff. Floods are frequent not only in spring, but also in the summer and autumn and are often quite massive. The river freezes in late October to early November and stays under ice until late April to early May.

All the tributaries of the Ulma are quite short, except for the 111 km (69 mi) long Kera from the right.

== Fauna ==
Taimen, lenok, grayling, crucian carp, pike, burbot and Amur catfish are some of the common fish species in the waters of the Ulma river.

== See also ==
- List of rivers of Russia
