= Selemdzha Range =

Mountain range in Russia

- Селемджинский хребет
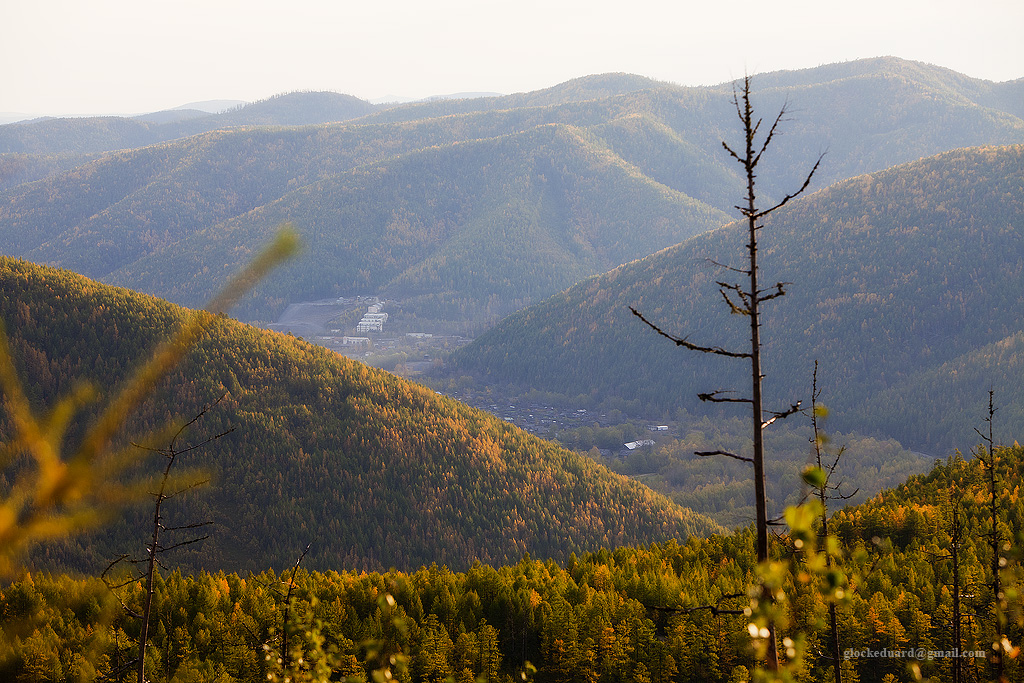
- View of the range near Tokur

Highest point
- Peak: Mount Iryungda
- Elevation: 1,940 m (6,360 ft)
- Coordinates: 53°29′16″N 134°08′59″E

Dimensions
- Length: 250 km (160 mi) E/W

Geography
- Location within Far Eastern Federal District
- Location: Amur Oblast, Khabarovsk Krai, Russian Far East
- Range coordinates: 53°20′N 132°50′E

Geology
- Orogeny: Alpine orogeny
- Rock type(s): Granite and volcanic rock

Climbing
- Easiest route: From Ekimchan

The Selemdzha Range (Russian: Селемджинский хребет) is a range of mountains in the Russian Far East. Administratively it belongs partly to Amur Oblast and partly to the Khabarovsk Krai of the Russian Federation.

There is gold ore prospection in the area of the range.

== Geography ==
The Selemdzha Range is a range of moderate altitudes located in the eastern end of Amur Oblast and the western side of Khabarovsk Krai. Is highest point is 1,940 metres (6,360 ft) high Mount Iryungda located in the eastern part. River Inaragda, a right tributary of the Selitkan, has its sources in the range.

The range runs in a roughly east/west direction for about 250 kilometres (160 mi) flanking the northern banks of the Selemdzha River. To the north of the western part of the mountain chain rises the Dzhagdy Range and to the south of its eastern part, the Ezop Range, running roughly parallel to it. The northern end of the Yam-Alin and the southern end of the Taikan Range meet at the easternmost limit of the range.

== Flora ==
The slopes of the range are covered by taiga, mainly consisting of larch.

== See also ==
- List of mountains and hills of Russia
- Northeast Siberian taiga
- Selemdzha mine
