= Oktyabrsky, Amur Oblast =

Oktyabrsky Октябрьский
- Selo
- Location within Amur Oblast Location within Russia
- Coordinates: 53°00′N 128°38′E
- Country: Russia
- Region: Amur Oblast
- District: Zeysky District
- Time zone: UTC+9:00

Oktyabrsky (Russian: Октябрьский) is a rural locality (a selo) and the administrative center of Oktyabrsky Selsoviet of Zeysky District, Amur Oblast, Russia. The population was 1,044 as of 2018. There are 37 streets.

== Geography ==
Oktyabrsky is located near the right bank of the Gar River, the main tributary of the Orlovka (Mamyn), 228 km (142 mi) southeast of Zeya (the district's administrative centre) by road. Yasny is the nearest rural locality.

There is a large site of uranium mining and processing facilities in near the Russia–China border.
