= Turan Range =

Mountain range in Russia

- Хребет Тура̀на
- Location within Far Eastern Federal District

Highest point
- Peak: Middle Nanaki
- Elevation: 1,806 m (5,925 ft)

Dimensions
- Length: 300 km (190 mi) NE/SW

Geography
- Location: Amur Oblast, Khabarovsk Krai, Russian Far East
- Range coordinates: 51°0′N 131°0′E
- Parent range: Yankan - Tukuringra - Soktakhan - Dzhagdy
- Borders on: Ezop Range

Geology
- Orogeny: Alpine orogeny
- Rock type(s): Granite and metamorphic rock

Climbing
- Easiest route: From Arkhara

The Turan Range (Russian: Хребет Тура̀на) is a range of mountains in far North-eastern Russia. Administratively it belongs partly to Amur Oblast and partly to the Khabarovsk Krai of the Russian Federation.

== History ==
The range was formerly a remote area, first explored by Peter Carl Ludwig Schwarz during the East Siberian Expedition of 1855. It was mapped by Arseniy Usoltsev together with geological engineer Pyotr Gorlov in 1958.

A railway tunnel of the Baikal–Amur Mainline was built across the range.

== Geography ==
The Turan is a range in northeastern Siberia, located in the southeastern end of Amur Oblast and the southwestern side of Khabarovsk Krai. It is part of the Yankan - Tukuringra - Soktakhan - Dzhagdy group of mountain ranges. Its ridges have a massive look, with rounded mountaintops.

The range runs in a roughly NNE/SSW direction for about 300 kilometres (190 mi), and its northeastern part is deeply dissected by river valleys. To the north the mountain chain connects with the Ezop Range (Езоп) and to the west and the southwest lies the Zeya-Bureya Lowland. The Bureya reservoir is located to the south. The highest point of the Turan is the 1,806 metres (5,925 ft) high Middle Nanaki (Средний Нанаки) located near the northeastern end of the range.

=== Hydrography ===
The Turan Range divides the catchment area of the Selemdzha River (a tributary of the Zeya River) to the west, and the Bureya River (a tributary of the Amur River) to the east. The Tashina River and the Selemdzha tributaries Ulma and Byssa, have their sources in the range.

== Flora and fauna ==
The slopes of the range are covered by conifer forests, such as larch, fir and spruce up to altitudes ranging between 700 metres (2,300 ft) and 900 metres (3,000 ft). Dwarf Siberian pine shrub grows in the higher elevations.

The range is part of the original habitat of the Amur cat.

== See also ==
- Northeast Siberian taiga
- Palearctic realm
- Temperate coniferous forest
