= Verkhnebureinsky District =

Verkhnebureinsky District Верхнебуреинский район (Russian)
- District
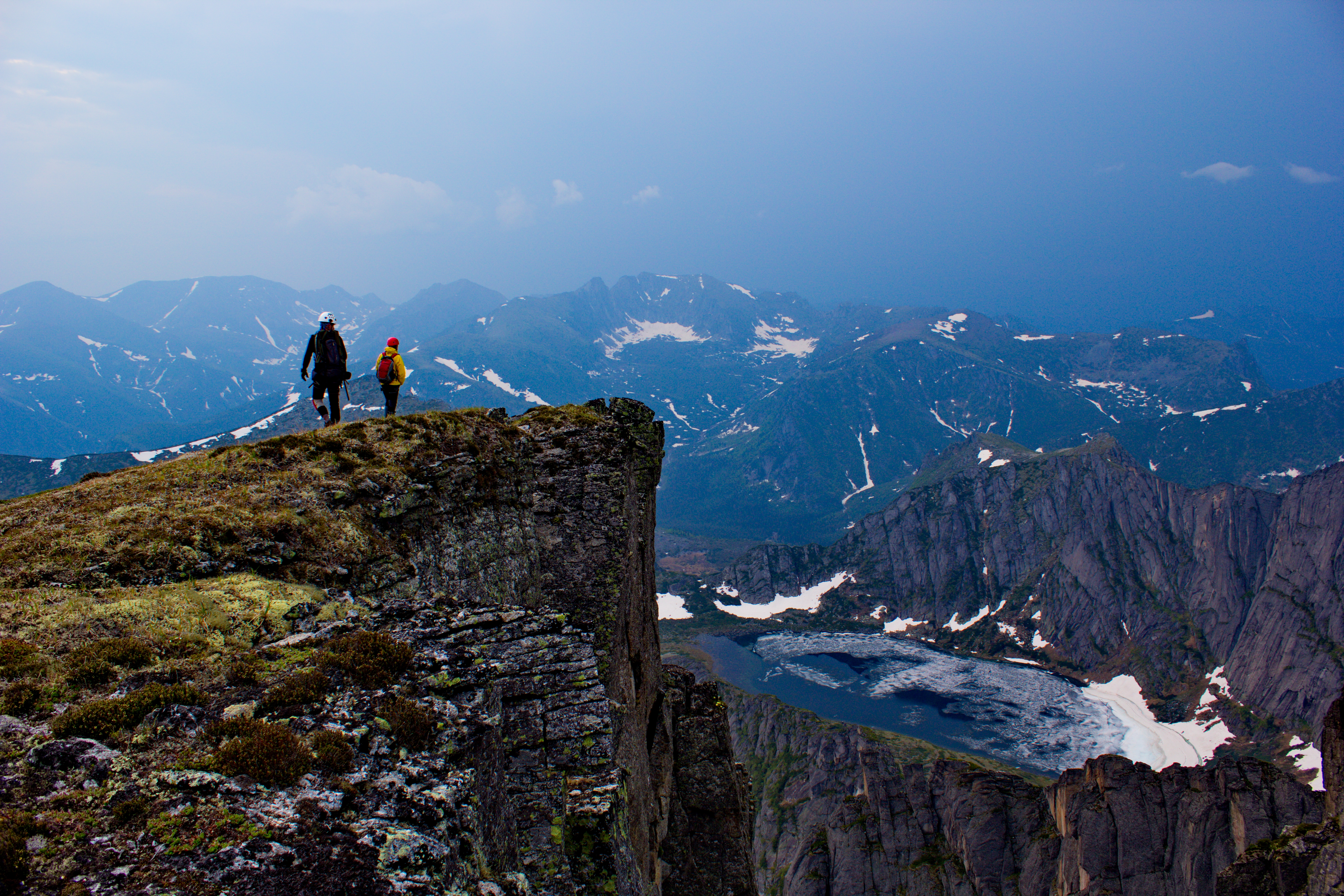
- Dusse-Alin Range

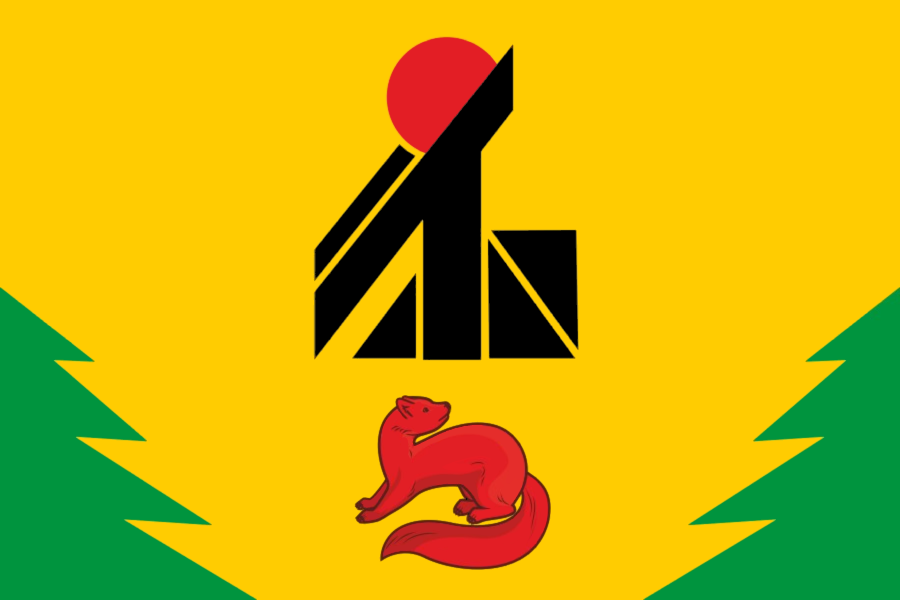
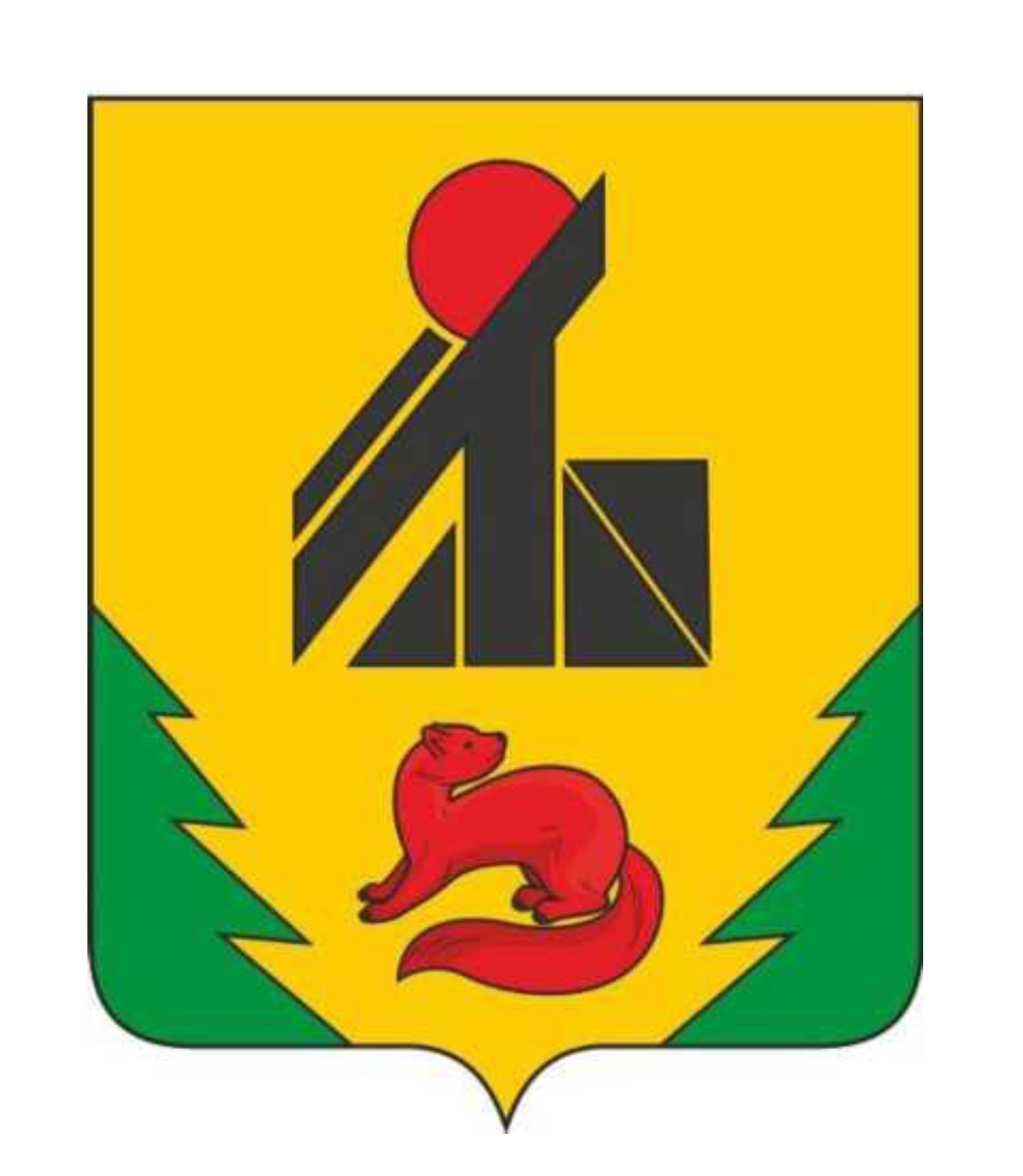
- Flag Coat of arms
- Location of Verkhnebureinsky District in Khabarovsk Krai
- Coordinates: 51°10′N 132°50′E
- Country: Russia
- Federal subject: Khabarovsk Krai
- Established: 1927
- Administrative center: Chegdomyn

Area
  - Total: 63,561 km^{2} (24,541 sq mi)

Population (2010 Census)
  - Total: 27,457
  - Density: 0.43198/km^{2} (1.1188/sq mi)
  - Urban: 80.9%
  - Rural: 19.1%

Administrative structure
  - Inhabited localities: 2 urban-type settlements, 28 rural localities

Municipal structure
  - Municipally incorporated as: Verkhnebureinsky Municipal District
  - Municipal divisions: 2 urban settlements, 11 rural settlements
- Time zone: UTC+10 (MSK+7)
- OKTMO ID: 08614000
- Website: http://admvbr.ucoz.ru/

Verkhnebureinsky District (Russian: Верхнебуре́инский райо́н), Upper Bureya District, is an administrative and municipal district (raion), one of the seventeen in Khabarovsk Krai, Russia. It is located in the west of the krai. The area of the district is 63,561 square kilometers (24,541 sq mi). Its administrative center is the urban locality (a work settlement) of Chegdomyn. Population: 27,457 (2010 census); 33,250 (2002 census); 59,705 (1989 Soviet census). The population of Chegdomyn accounts for 47.5% of the district's total population.

The Bureinsky Nature Reserve, a protected area (zapovednik) is located in the district, covering the upper course of the Bureya River.
