= Dusse-Alin =

Mountain range in Khabarovsk Krai, Russia

- Дуссе-Алинь
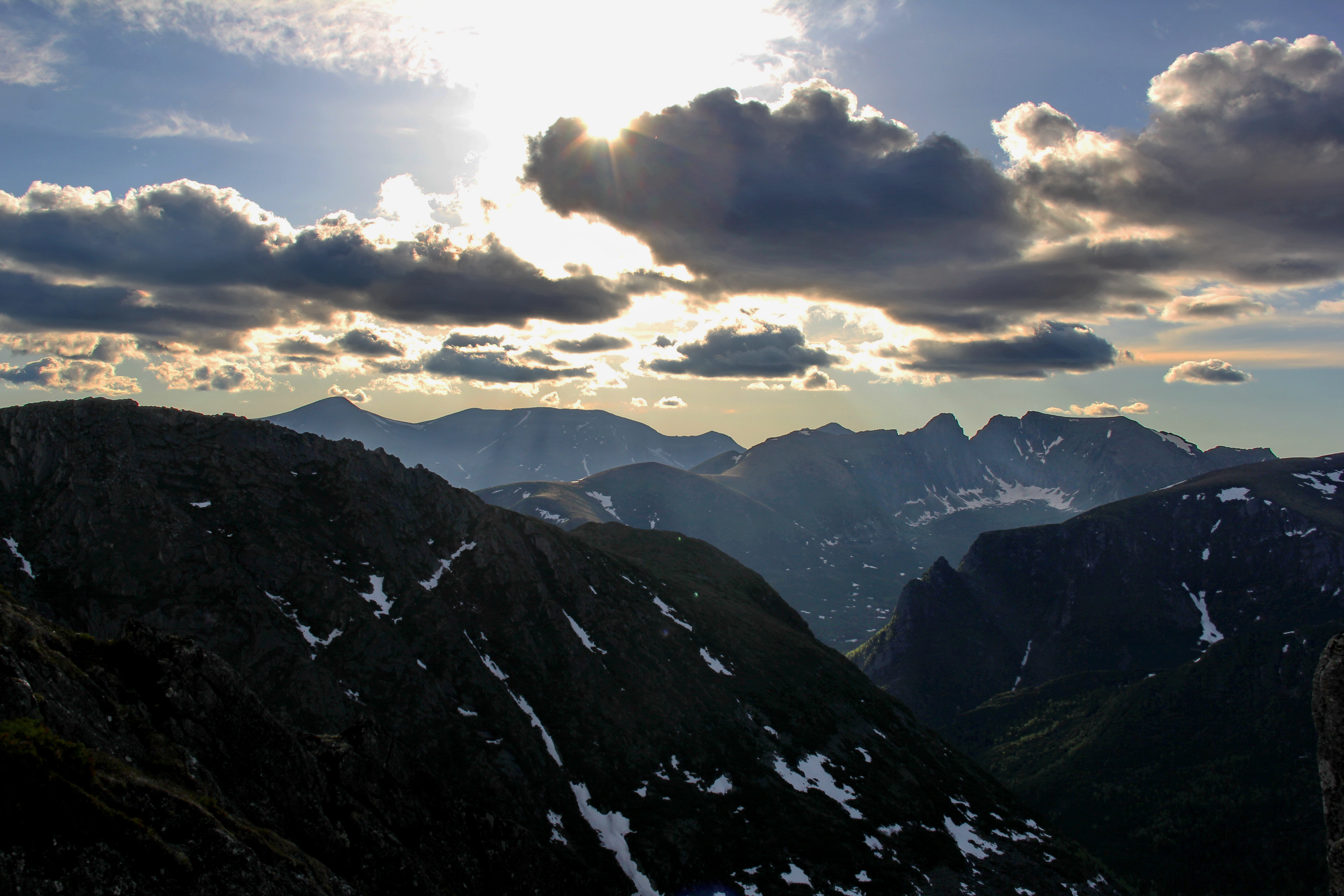
- View of some peaks of the range

Highest point
- Peak: Unnamed
- Elevation: 2,175 m (7,136 ft)
- Coordinates: 52°06′32″N 134°53′37″E

Dimensions
- Length: 150 km (93 mi) S/N
- Width: 40 km (25 mi) E/W

Geography
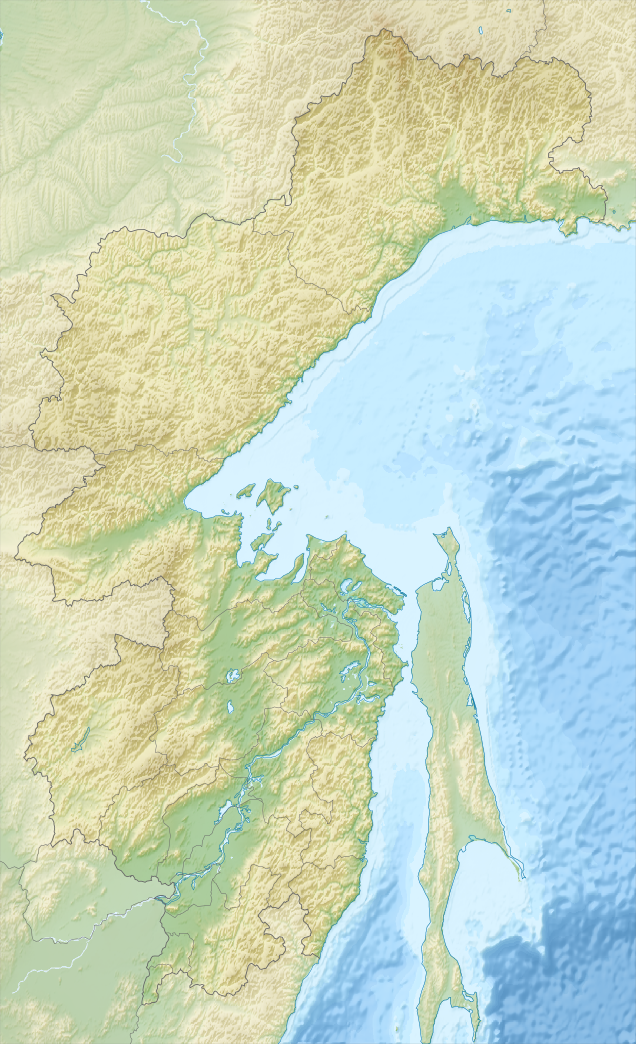
- Location within Khabarovsk Krai
- Country: Russia
- Federal subject: Khabarovsk Krai
- Range coordinates: 52°N 135°E

Geology
- Orogeny: Alpine orogeny
- Rock age: Permian
- Rock type(s): Metamorphic rock and granite

Climbing
- Easiest route: From Beryozovy (Solnechny District) or Sofiysk (Verkhnebureinsky District)

The Dusse-Alin (Note: Russian: Дуссе-Алинь, Manchu: ᡩᡝᠣᠰᡝ ᠠᠯᡳᠨ, Möllendorff: deose alin, Abkai: deuse alin, Chinese: 斗色山) is a mountain range in Khabarovsk Krai, in the Russian Far East.

Although it is named after this range, the Dusse-Alin Tunnel of the Baikal–Amur Mainline is located about 150 kilometres (93 mi) to the southwest.

== History ==
The range was first roughly mapped by Russian explorer Alexander von Middendorf in 1844. In the wake of his studies, a large Russian military expedition led by Nikolai Khristoforovich Akhte continued the exploration of the area between 1849 and 1853. The German surveyor of the Russian service Ludwig Schwarz took part in the expedition as an astronomer. Together with topographers Stepan Vasilievich Krutiv and Alexei Argunov, as well as geologist Nikolay Gavrilovich Meglitsky, the Dusse-Alin range area was studied and topographically surveyed in detail. Based on their measurements, the first accurate map of the Dusse-Alin was drawn. In 1861 German botanist and geologist of the Russian service Fyodor Schmidt carried out thorough physiographic and geological research in the area of the range.

In 1987 a 358,444 hectares (885,730 acres) section of the central and southern part of the range was declared a protected area (zapovednik), the Bureya Nature Reserve.

== Geography ==
The Dusse-Alin and the Yam-Alin to the north of it are northern prolongations of the Bureya Range. The mountains display alpine relief and stretch for about 150 kilometres (93 mi). The main ridge extends from north to south and in the middle it curves westwards for roughly 40 kilometres (25 mi), then it extends northwards again. The highest point of the range is an unnamed peak with a height of 2,175 metres (7,136 ft) located roughly in the central part.

To the northwest of the range the Ezop Range extends westwards. In the north it connects with the southern end of the Yam-Alin and the Bureya Range stretches roughly southwestwards at the southwestern end. To the east of the range flows the Amgun river.

=== Hydrography ===
The Dusse-Alin forms the watershed between the rivers of the Bureya and Selemdzha basins, and those of the Amgun basin. Among the rivers having their sources in the slopes of the range are the left and right Bureya, that give origin to the Bureya river, as well as the Nilan — a left tributary of the Amgun, and several right tributaries of the Kerby, also a left tributary of the Amgun.

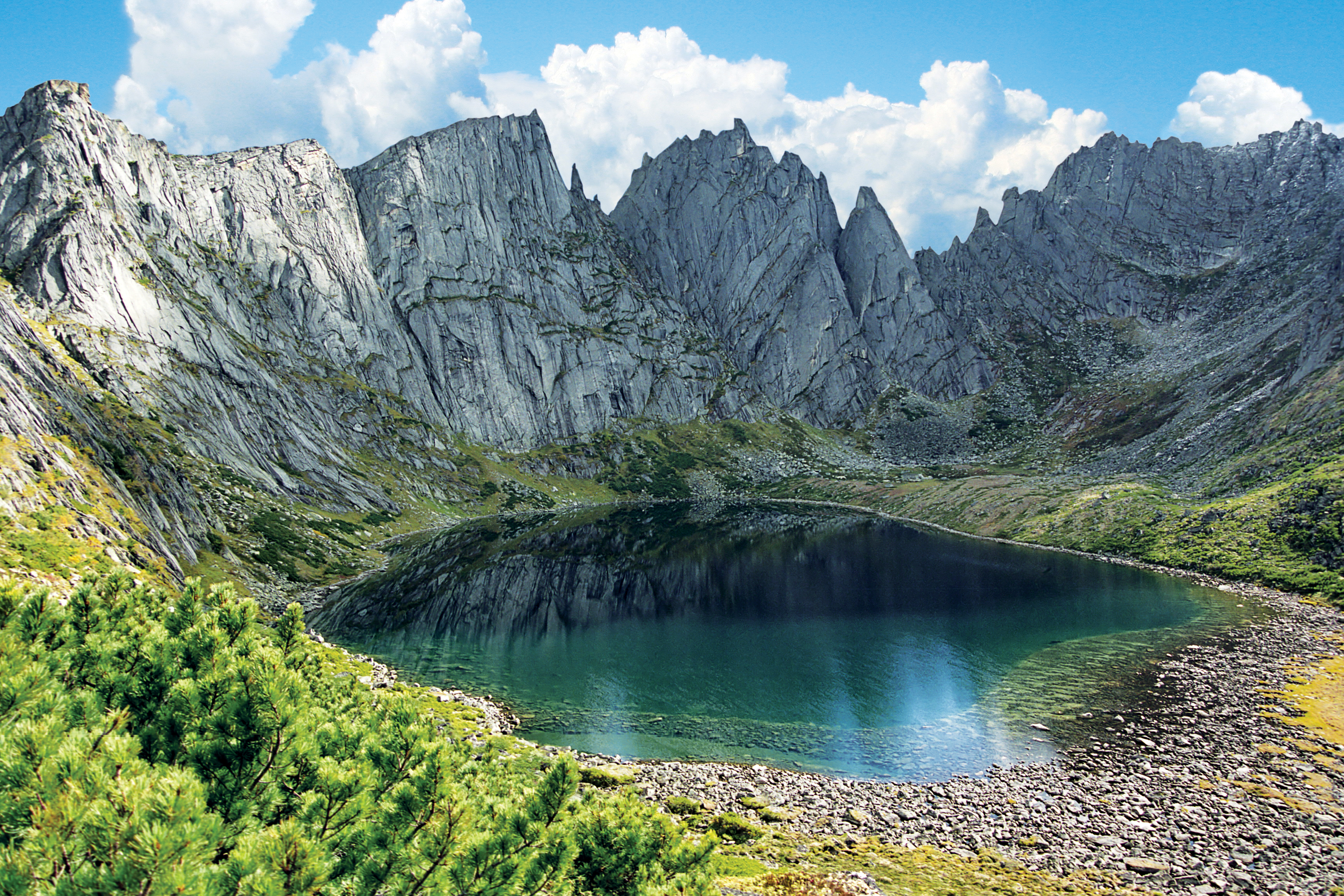
Lake Medvezhye in the Dusse-Alin.

== Flora ==
The lower slopes of the range are covered with spruce and larch forests up to altitudes of 1,300 metres (4,300 ft), followed by thickets of dwarf cedar and mountain tundra at higher elevations.

== See also ==
- List of mountains and hills of Russia
- Tourism in Khabarovsk Krai
