= Bogoslovka, Ivanovsky District, Amur Oblast =

Bogoslovka Богословка
- Selo
- Location within Amur Oblast Location within Russia
- Coordinates: 50°19′N 128°09′E
- Country: Russia
- Region: Amur Oblast
- District: Ivanovsky District
- Time zone: UTC+9:00

Bogoslovka (Russian: Богословка) is a rural locality (a selo) in Andreyevsky Selsoviet of Ivanovsky District, Amur Oblast, Russia. The population was 49 as of 2018. There are two streets.

== Geography ==
Bogoslovka is located on the left bank of the Manchzhurka River, 14 km southeast of Ivanovka (the district's administrative centre) by road. Pravovostochnoye is the nearest rural locality.
