= Orlovka (Mamyn) =

Orlovka (Mamyn) Орловка / Мамын
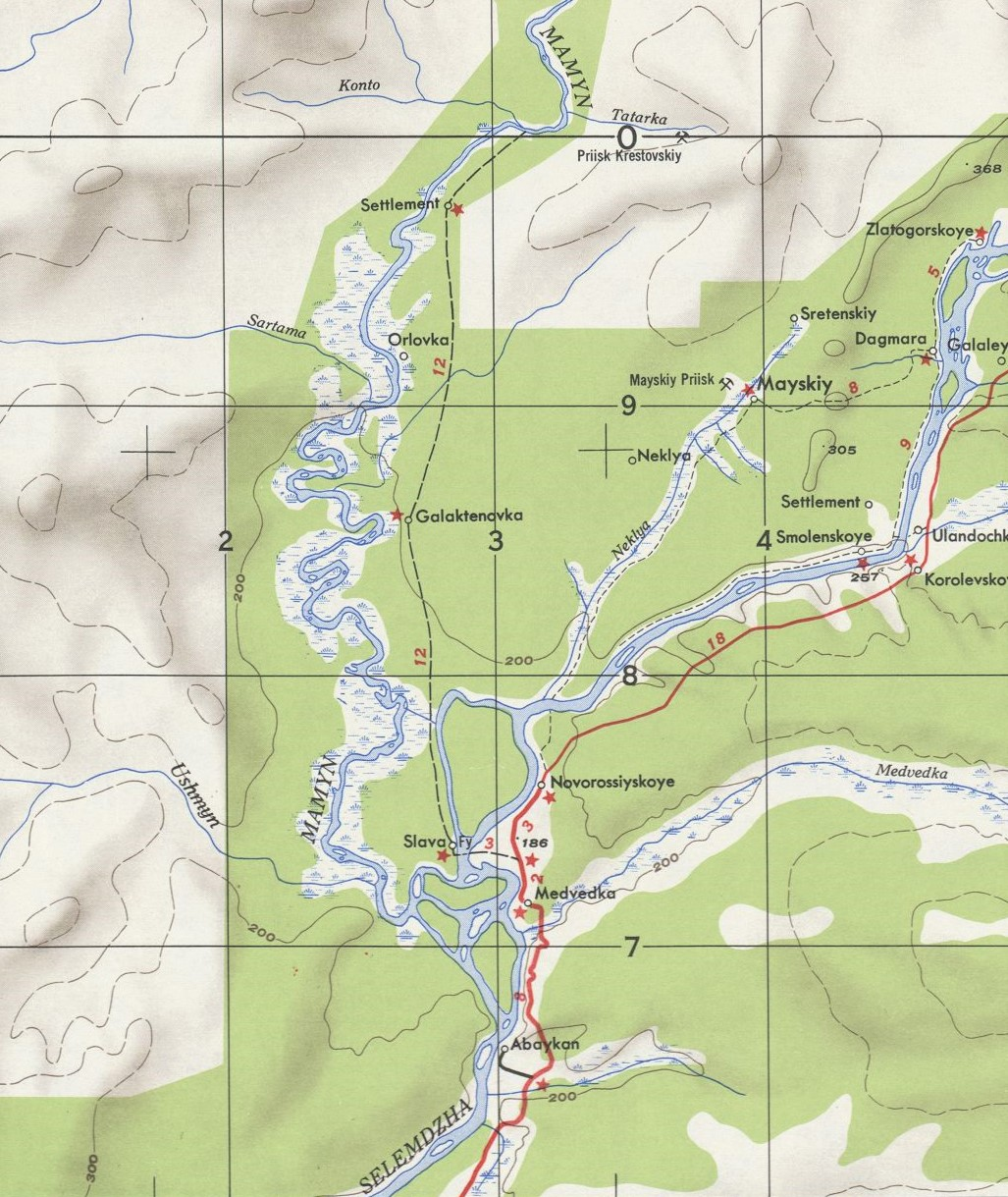
- Map section of the confluence of the Mamyn (Orlovka) and the Selemdzha

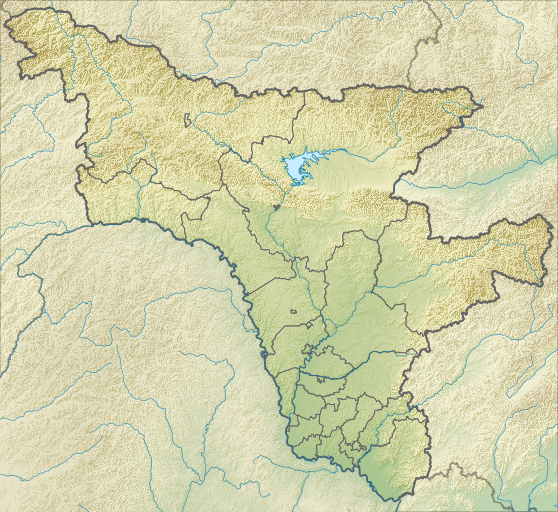
- Mouth location in Amur Oblast, Russia

Location
- Country: Russia

Physical characteristics
- Source
  - location: Dzhagdy Range
  - coordinates: 53°04′36″N 129°33′05″E
  - elevation: 268 m (879 ft)
- Mouth: Selemdzha
  - coordinates: 52°05′01″N 129°25′40″E
  - elevation: 179 m (587 ft)
- Length: 208 km (129 mi)
- Basin size: 11,300 km^{2} (4,400 sq mi)
- Discharge
  - average: 160 m^{3}/s (5,700 cu ft/s)

Basin features
- Progression: Selemdzha → Zeya→ Amur→ Sea of Okhotsk

The Orlovka (Russian: Орловка), also known as Mamyn (Russian: Мамын), is a river in Mazanovsky District, Amur Oblast, Russia. It is the 4th longest tributary of the Selemdzha after the Byssa, with a length of 208 kilometres (129 mi) and the second in drainage basin area, with 11,300 square kilometres (4,400 mi^{2}).

The river basin includes the Garinskoye iron ore deposit, one of the largest in the Russian Far East, as well as gold prospecting areas. The only settlement in the river basin is Oktyabrsky, located by river Gar, the main tributary. In the past there had been other settlements by the river, such as the Slava collective farm on the left bank near the mouth, but they were abandoned.

== History ==
The original Tungusic name of the river was replaced in 1972 under the USSR administration at the time of the renaming of geographical sites in the Russian Far East. The name "Orlovka" honors Warrant Officer Orlov, who visited the area in 1847 to trade with the local Evenks on behalf of the Russian-American Company.

In 1999, the Orlovsky Zakaznik (Орловский заказник), a 121,456 ha (300,120 acres) protected area, was established in the lower basin of the river. The fauna of the state reserve includes elk, red deer, roe deer, wild boar, bear, sable, mink, lynx, otter, Oriental stork, hooded crane, mandarin duck, white-tailed eagle, osprey and greater spotted eagle.

== Course ==
The Orlovka is a right tributary of the Selemdzha. It has its origin in the southern slopes of the Dzhagdy Range at the confluence of the 44 km (27 mi) long Left Orlovka (Left Mamyn) and 74 km (46 mi) long Right Orlovka (Right Mamyn) rivers. In its upper reaches the Orlovka flows with relatively moderate speed as a mountain river with some rapids among pebbles and boulders. After its confluence with the Gar, it progresses slowly southwards in a wide floodplain, meandering through swampland dotted with small lakes. It divides into branches near the area where it joins the banks of the Selemdzha, 78 kilometres (48 mi) from its mouth in the Zeya. The mouths of the Orlovka are near Abaykan, downstream from the mouth of the Nora (river).

The river basin is almost entirely within the Amur-Zeya Plateau. The climate is harsh, with long and very cold winters. In January, the average temperature sinks to −31.1 °C (−24.0 °F). Summers are short, with an average temperature in July of 20 °C (68 °F). The annual precipitation in the basin ranges between 550 millimetres (22 in) and 580 millimetres (23 in).

There is patchy distribution of permafrost in the basin, the layer being closest to the surface in river wetlands with moss cover. The river freezes in mid October and stays under ice until the end of April.

=== Tributaries ===
The river has many tributaries, the longest one being the 208 km (129 mi) long Gar with a basin size of 3,870 square kilometres (1,490 mi^{2}), which joins the right bank of the Orlovka in its lower course. Other important ones are the 89 km (55 mi) long Inkan, the 68 km (42 mi) long Byki, the 71 km (44 mi) long Sartama and the 64 km (40 mi) long Ushmyn from the right, and the 76 km (47 mi) long Sokhatinaya and the 56 km (35 mi) long Armiya from the left.

== See also ==
- List of rivers of Russia
