= Putyatino, Ryazan Oblast =

Rural locality in Ryazan Oblast, Russia

Coordinates: 54°09′39″N 41°07′33″E

Putyatino (Russian: Путятино) is a rural locality (a selo) and the administrative center of Putyatinsky District, Ryazan Oblast, Russia. Population: 3,047 (2010 census); 3,122 (2002 census); 2,389 (1989 Soviet census).
