= Bogoslovka, Voronezh Oblast =

Bogoslovka Богословка
- Selo
- Location within Voronezh Oblast Location within Russia
- Coordinates: 51°49′N 40°02′E
- Country: Russia
- Region: Voronezh Oblast
- District: Verkhnekhavsky District
- Time zone: UTC+3:00

Bogoslovka (Russian: Богословка) is a rural locality (a selo) in Verkhnekhavskoye Rural Settlement, Verkhnekhavsky District, Voronezh Oblast, Russia. The population was 95 as of 2010. There are 3 streets.

== Geography ==
Bogoslovka is located 12 km east of Verkhnyaya Khava (the district's administrative centre) by road. Verkhnyaya Maza is the nearest rural locality.
