= Selemdzhinsky District =

Selemdzhinsky District Селемджинский район (Russian)
- District
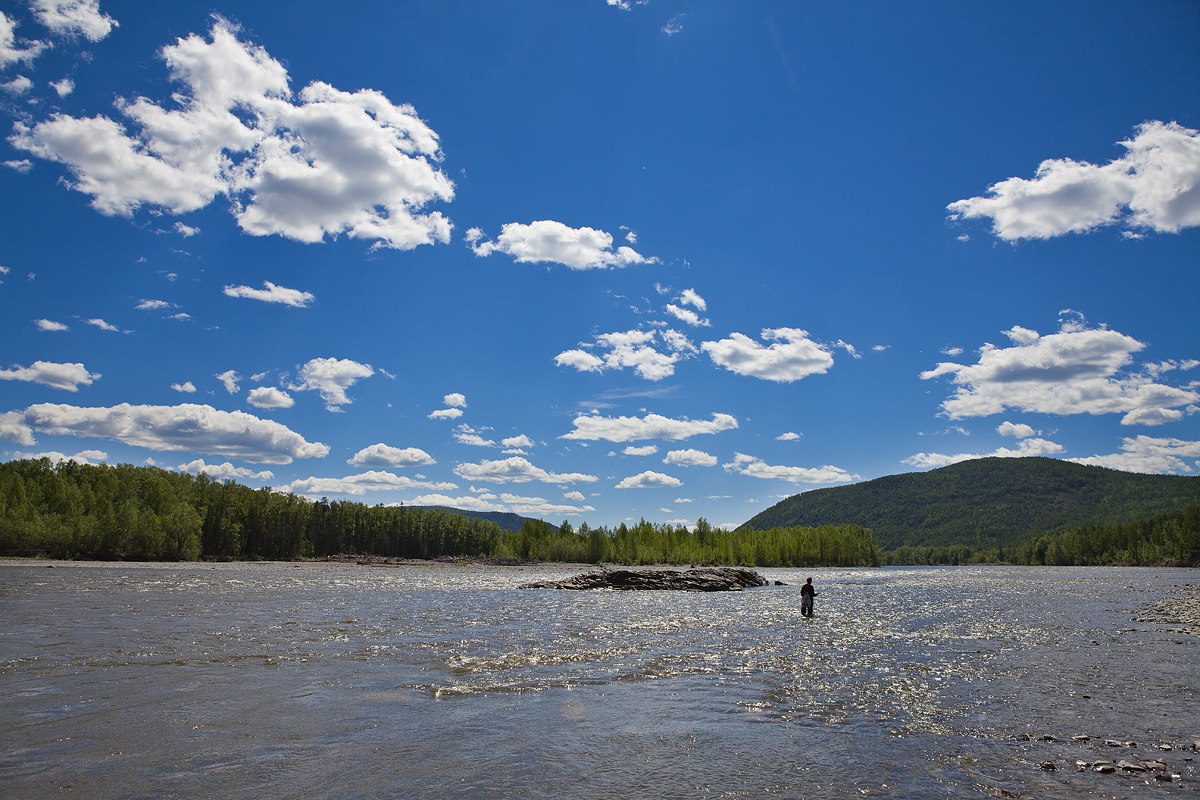
- Selemdzha River, Selemdzhinsky District

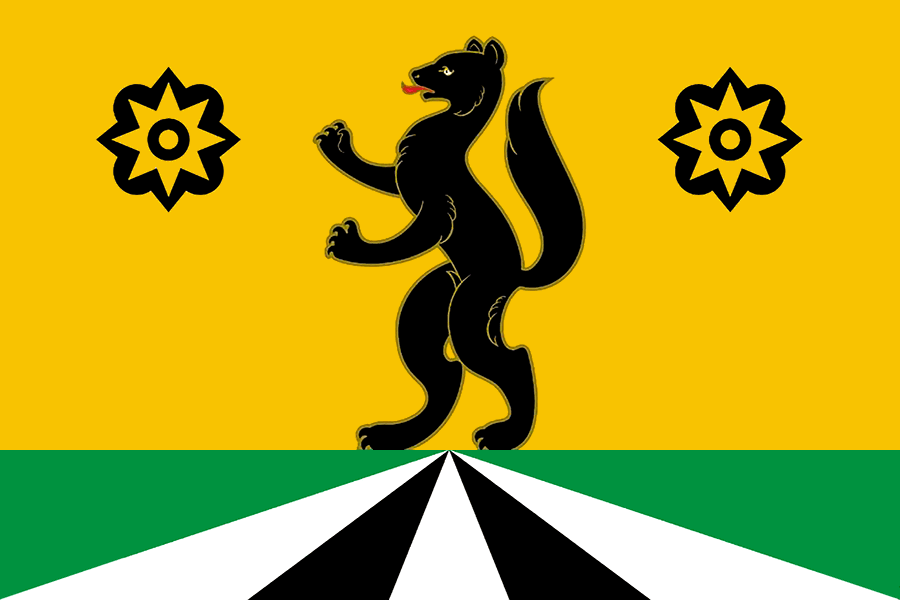
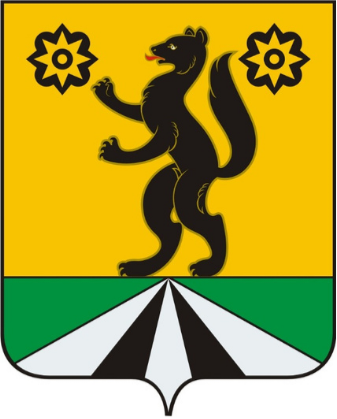
- Flag Coat of arms
- Location of Selemdzhinsky District in Amur Oblast
- Coordinates: 53°04′16″N 132°56′21″E
- Country: Russia
- Federal subject: Amur Oblast
- Established: 1926
- Administrative center: Ekimchan

Area
  - Total: 46,672 km^{2} (18,020 sq mi)

Population (2010 Census)
  - Total: 11,639
  - Density: 0.24938/km^{2} (0.64589/sq mi)
  - Urban: 71.1%
  - Rural: 28.9%

Administrative structure
  - Administrative divisions: 3 Urban settlements, 7 Rural settlements
  - Inhabited localities: 3 urban-type settlements, 11 rural localities

Municipal structure
  - Municipally incorporated as: Selemdzhinsky Municipal District
  - Municipal divisions: 3 urban settlements, 7 rural settlements
- Time zone: UTC+9 (MSK+6)
- OKTMO ID: 10645000
- Website: http://www.selemja.amsu.ru/

Selemdzhinsky District (Russian: Селемджи́нский райо́н) is an administrative and municipal district (raion), one of the twenty in Amur Oblast, Russia. The area of the district is 46,672 square kilometers (18,020 sq mi). Its administrative center is the urban locality (a work settlement) of Ekimchan. Population: 11,639 (2010 census); 11,808 (2002 Census); 20,632 (1989 Soviet census). The population of Ekimchan accounts for 10.4% of the district's total population.

== Geography ==
The Selemdzha Range, Ezop Range, Yam-Alin Range and the northern part of the Turan Range, are located in the district. River Selemdzha and its tributaries Ulma, Byssa and Nora flow across the district.
