= Putyatino, Vologda Oblast =

Putyatino Путятино
- Village
- Location within Vologda Oblast Location within Russia
- Coordinates: 59°21′N 39°31′E
- Country: Russia
- Region: Vologda Oblast
- District: Vologodsky District
- Time zone: UTC+3:00

Putyatino (Russian: Путятино) is a rural locality (a village) in Kubenskoye Rural Settlement, Vologodsky District, Vologda Oblast, Russia. The population was 1 as of 2002.

== Geography ==
Putyatino is located 32 km northwest of Vologda (the district's administrative centre) by road. Pogost Rozhdestvo is the nearest rural locality.
