= Byssa (river) =

Byssa Бысса
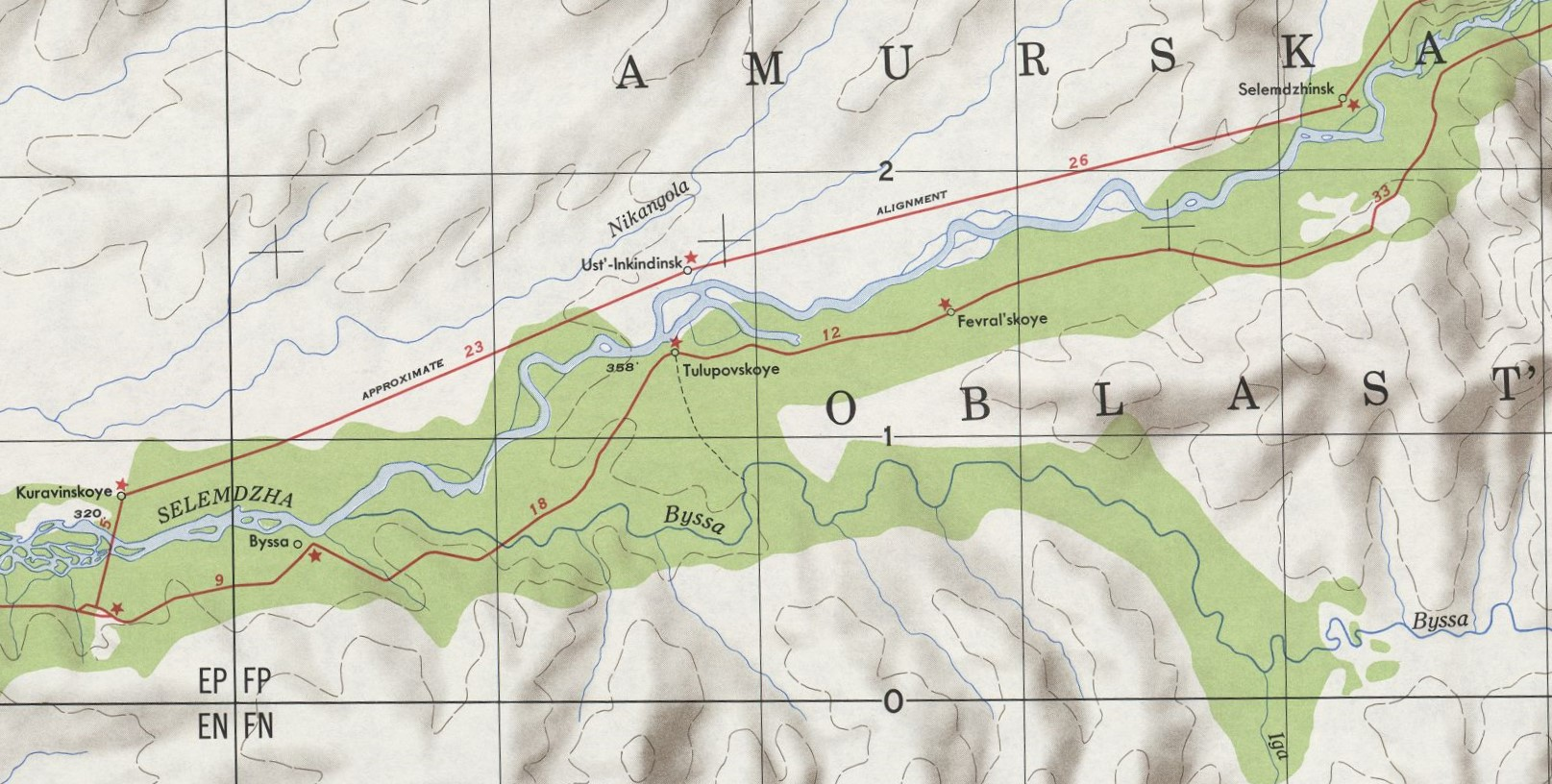
- Map section of the Selemdzha and Byssa river confluence.

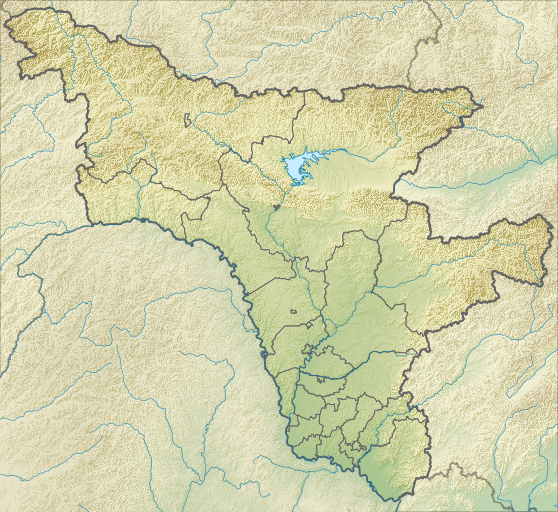
- Mouth location in Amur Oblast, Russia

Location
- Country: Russia

Physical characteristics
- Source
  - location: Turan Range
  - coordinates: 52°32′55″N 132°11′10″E
  - elevation: 800 m (2,600 ft)
- Mouth: Selemdzha
  - location: Near Byssa
  - coordinates: 52°25′03″N 130°33′56″E
  - elevation: 239 m (784 ft)
- Length: 235 km (146 mi)
- Basin size: 6,370 km^{2} (2,460 sq mi)

Basin features
- Progression: Selemdzha → Zeya→ Amur→ Sea of Okhotsk

The Byssa (Russian: Бысса) is a river in Selemdzhinsky District, Amur Oblast, Russia. It is the third longest tributary of the Selemdzha, with a length of 235 kilometres (146 mi) and with 6,370 square kilometres (2,460 mi^{2}) the third in drainage basin area, after the Orlovka. The name of the river originated in the Evenki language.

The river flows across a largely uninhabited area except for Byssa and Fevralsk villages in the area of its mouth. South of Fevralsk the river is crossed by the Far Eastern Railway line.

== Course ==
The Byssa is a left tributary of the Selemdzha. It has its origin at an elevation of about 800 m (2,600 ft) in the northwestern slopes of the Turan Range. The river flows in a roughly southwestern direction with rapids and a winding channel in its upper reaches. After leaving the mountainous area it enters a wide swampy valley where it meanders slowly all along its middle and lower course. Finally it meets the left bank of the Selemdzha 206 kilometres (128 mi) from its mouth in the Zeya.

The main tributaries of the Byssa are the 73 kilometres (45 mi) long Iga from the left and the Sinnikan from the right. There are hot springs in the middle basin of the river where the water reaches a temperature of 43 °C (109 °F).

== See also ==
- List of rivers of Russia
