= Putyatinsky District =

Putyatinsky District Путятинский район (Russian)
- District
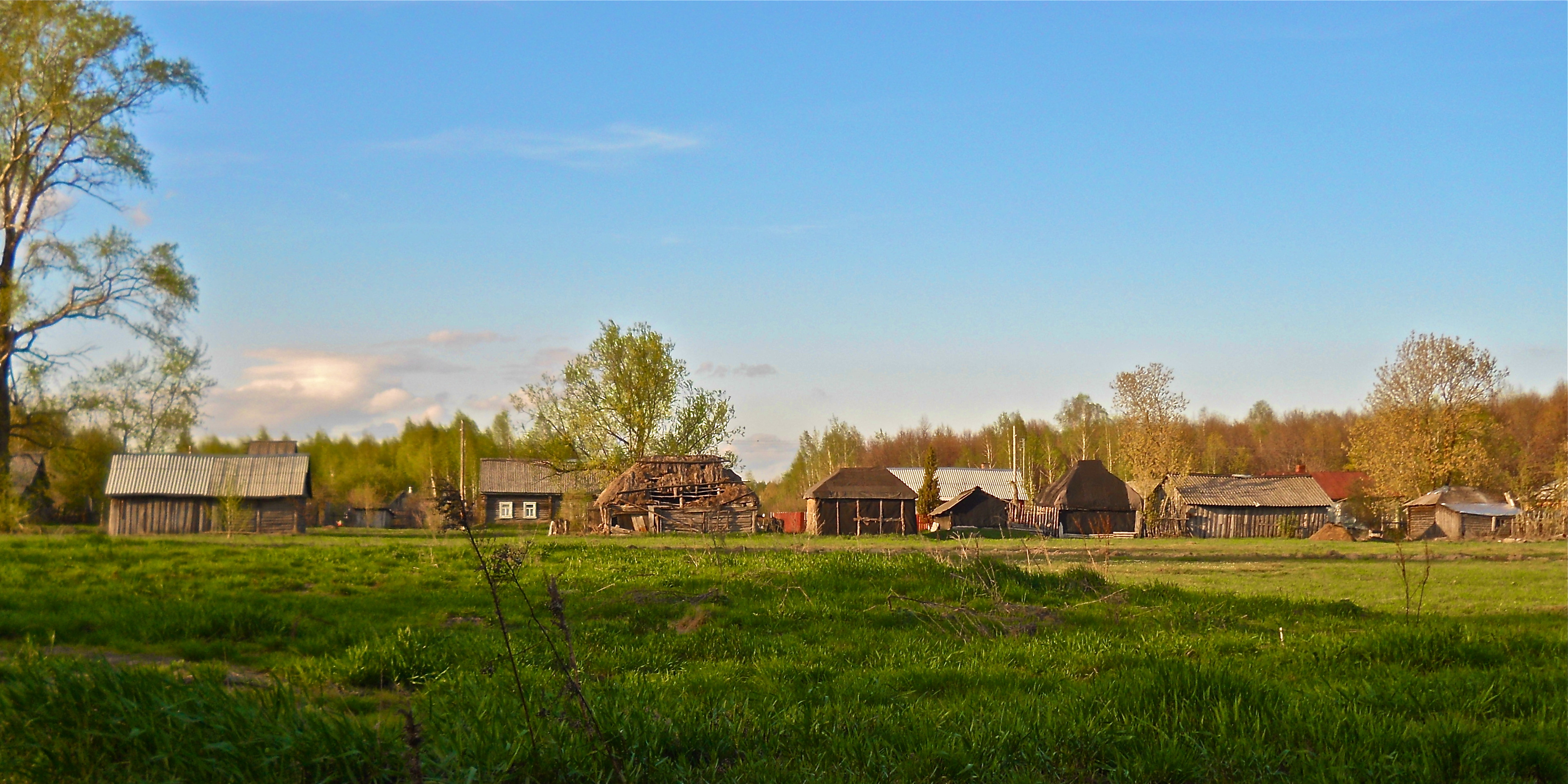
- Berezovka, Putyatinsky District

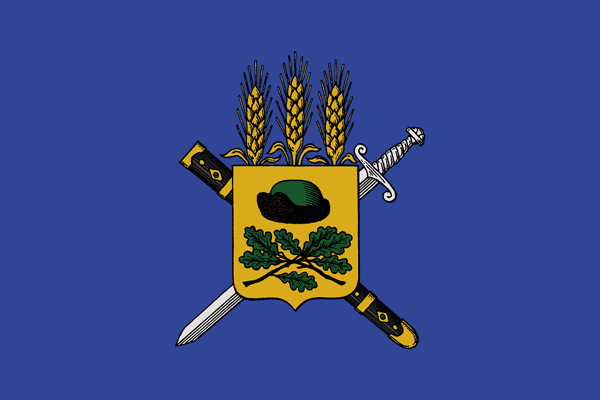
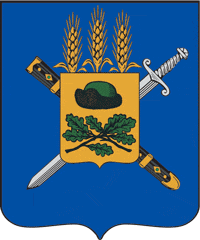
- Flag Coat of arms
- Location of Putyatinsky District in Ryazan Oblast
- Coordinates: 54°09′41″N 41°07′12″E
- Country: Russia
- Federal subject: Ryazan Oblast
- Established: 21 February 1935
- Administrative center: Putyatino

Area
  - Total: 1,008 km^{2} (389 sq mi)

Population (2010 Census)
  - Total: 7,511
  - Density: 7.451/km^{2} (19.30/sq mi)
  - Urban: 0%
  - Rural: 100%

Administrative structure
  - Administrative divisions: 10 rural okrug
  - Inhabited localities: 77 rural localities

Municipal structure
  - Municipally incorporated as: Putyatinsky Municipal District
  - Municipal divisions: 0 urban settlements, 6 rural settlements
- Time zone: UTC+3 (MSK)
- OKTMO ID: 61626000
- Website: http://www.adminpronsk.ru/

Putyatinsky District (Russian: Путя́тинский райо́н) is an administrative and municipal district (raion), one of the twenty-five in Ryazan Oblast, Russia. It is located in the southeastern central part of the oblast. The area of the district is 1,008 square kilometers (389 sq mi). Its administrative center is the rural locality (a selo) of Putyatino. Population: 7,511 (2010 Census); 8,745 (2002 census); 10,398 (1989 Soviet census). The population of Putyatino accounts for 40.6% of the district's total population.

== Notable residents ==
- Valentin Zubkov (1923–1979), Soviet film actor, born in the settlement of Peschanoye
