= Ezop Range =

Mountain range in Russia

- Хребет Эзоп
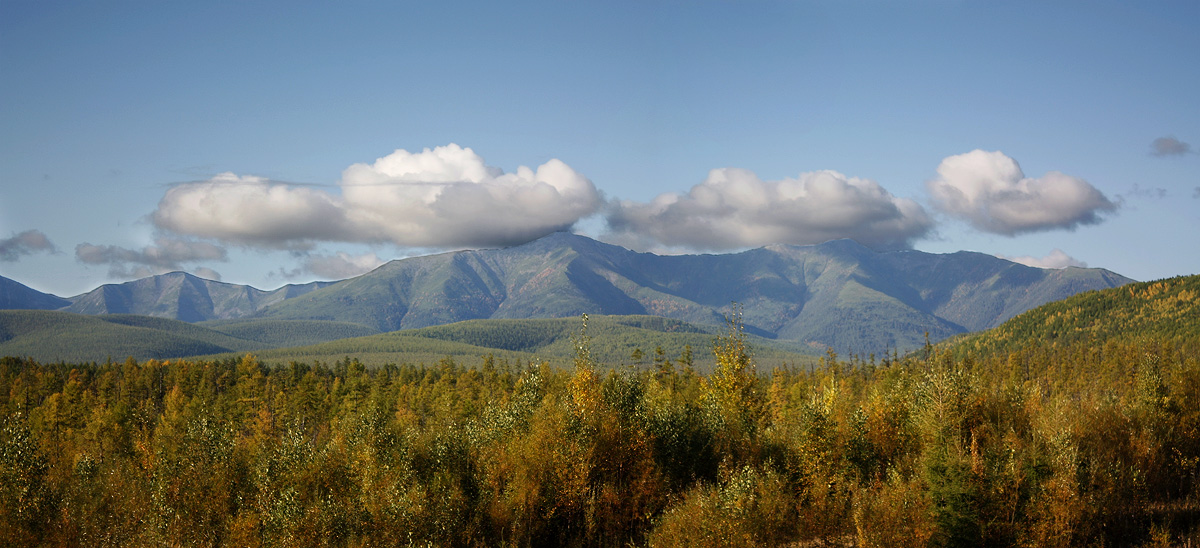
- View of the range from the north

Highest point
- Peak: Unnamed
- Elevation: 2,241 m (7,352 ft)

Dimensions
- Length: 150 km (93 mi) E/W

Geography
- Location within Far Eastern Federal District
- Location: Amur Oblast, Khabarovsk Krai, Russian Far East
- Range coordinates: 52°50′N 134°20′E
- Parent range: Yankan - Tukuringra - Soktakhan - Dzhagdy
- Borders on: Turan Range

Geology
- Orogeny: Alpine orogeny
- Rock type(s): Granite and volcanic rock

Climbing
- Easiest route: From Ogodzha

The Ezop Range (Russian: Хребет Эзоп) is a range of mountains in far North-eastern Russia. Administratively it belongs partly to Amur Oblast and partly to the Khabarovsk Krai of the Russian Federation.

The range is part of the Ezop / Yam-Alin volcanic zone.

== Geography ==
The Ezop is a range in northeastern Siberia, located in the eastern end of Amur Oblast and the southwestern side of Khabarovsk Krai. It is part of the Yankan - Tukuringra - Soktakhan - Dzhagdy group of mountain ranges.

The Ezop Range runs in a roughly east/west direction for about 150 kilometres (93 mi). The Selemdzha River has its sources in the range. To the north of the mountain chain rises the Selemdzha Range running roughly parallel to it. The northern end of the Turan Range meets the southern slopes of the range from the south. At the eastern end rise the Yam-Alin and Dusse-Alin ranges, which run in a north/south direction in Khabarovsk Krai. To the southwest lies the Zeya-Bureya Lowland. The highest point of the Ezop is a 2,241 metres (7,352 ft) high unnamed summit.

== Flora ==
The slopes of the range are covered by taiga, mainly consisting of larch, up to elevations of 1,200 metres (3,900 ft).

== See also ==
- Northeast Siberian taiga
- Palearctic realm
- Temperate coniferous forest
