= Yam-Alin =

- Ям-Алинь
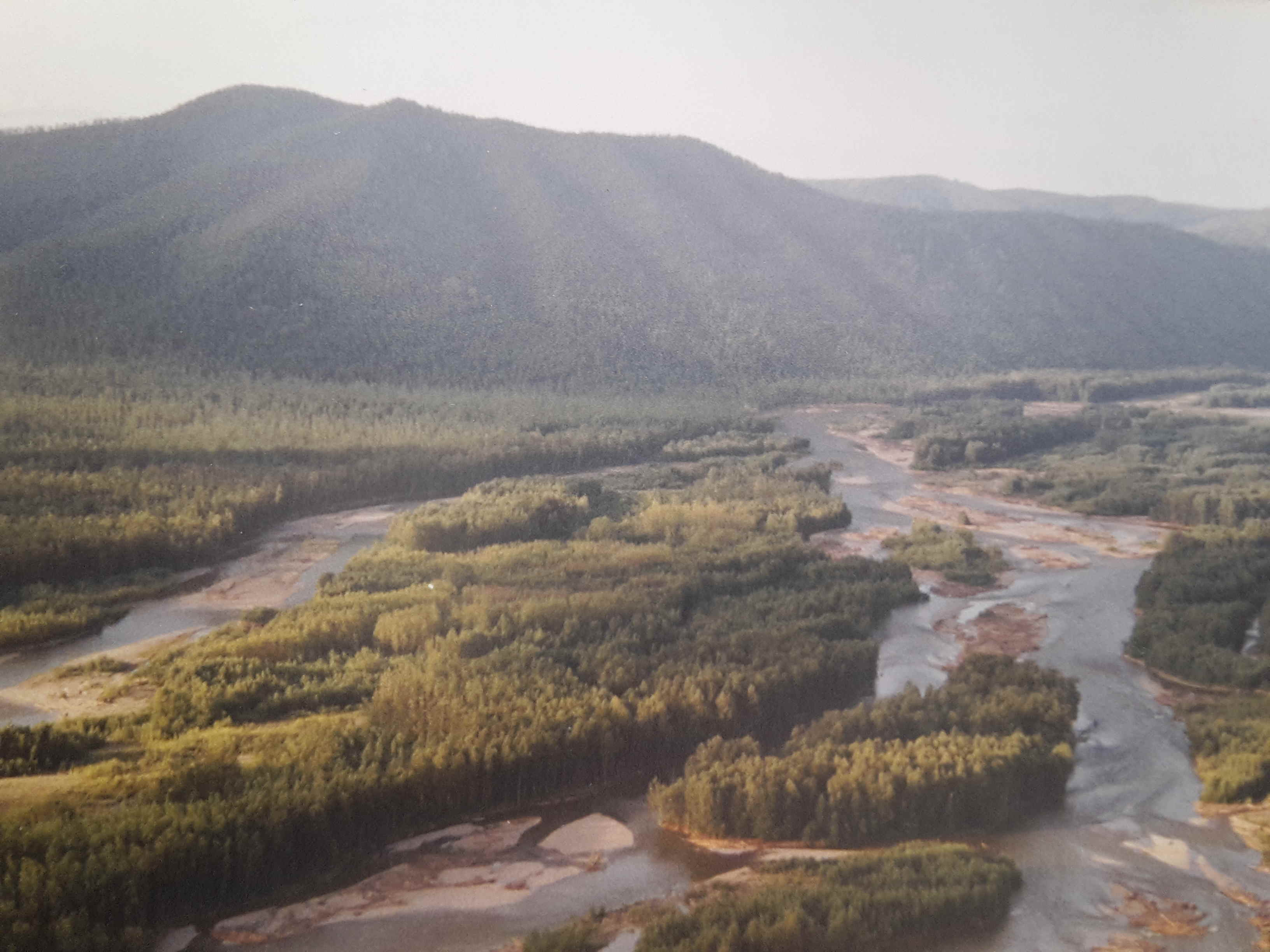
- View of the valley of the Nimelen

Highest point
- Peak: Gorod-Makit
- Elevation: 2,298 m (7,539 ft)
- Coordinates: 52°57′07″N 134°39′26″E

Dimensions
- Length: 180 km (110 mi) S/N
- Width: 40 km (25 mi) E/W

Geography
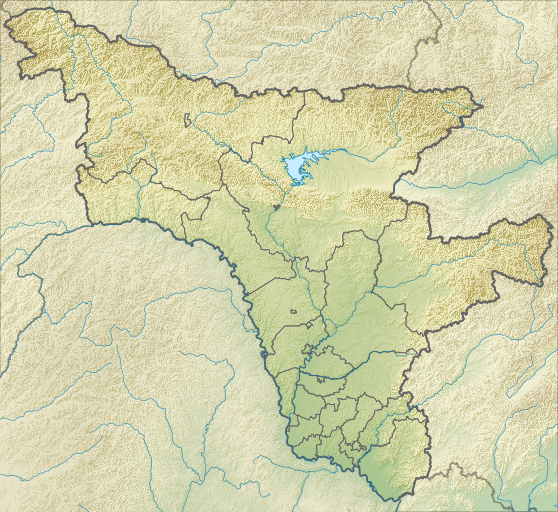
- Location within Amur Oblast
- Country: Russia
- Federal subject: Khabarovsk Krai; Amur Oblast
- Range coordinates: 53°15′N 134°45′E

Geology
- Orogeny: Alpine orogeny
- Rock age: Permian
- Rock type(s): Volcanic rock, granite and crystalline schist

Climbing
- Easiest route: From Ekimchan

The Yam-Alin (Russian: Ям-Алинь) is a mountain range in Amur Oblast and Khabarovsk Krai, Russian Far East.

The range is part of the Ezop/Yam-Alin volcanic zone.

== History ==
The range is located in a remote area and was unexplored until mid 19th century. Between 1849 and 1853, a large Russian military expedition led by Nikolai Khristoforovich Akhte operated in the Russian Far East. The German surveyor of the Russian service Ludwig Schwarz was assigned to it as an astronomer. Together with topographers Stepan Vasilievich Krutiv and Alexei Argunov, as well as geologist Nikolay Gavrilovich Meglitsky, the Yam-Alin range area was studied and topographically surveyed in detail. Based on their measurements, the first reliable map of Yam-Alin was drawn in 1851.

== Geography ==
The Yam-Alin and the Dusse-Alin to the south of it are northern prolongations of the Bureya Range. Its mountains display alpine relief and stretch for about 180 kilometres (110 mi). The highest point is Gorod Makit with a height of 2,298 metres (7,539 ft). To the southwest of the range rises the Ezop Range. In the north it connects with the southern end of the Taikan Range and to the northwest the Selemdzha Range stretches westwards.

=== Hydrography ===
The range forms the watershed between the rivers of the Selemdzha and Amgun basins. Some of the right tributaries of the Selemzha, such as the Takh-Urak, Kumusun and Selitkan, have their sources in the western slopes of the range. On the eastern there are the sources of a few left tributaries of the Amgun, such as the Kerby and Nimelen, as well as the Assyni (Ассыни), a tributary of the Tugur and the Munikan, a tributary of the Konin —a tributary of the Tugur.

== Flora ==
The lower slopes of the range are covered with coniferous forests up to altitudes of 1,500 metres (4,900 ft), followed by thickets of dwarf cedar and mountain tundra at higher elevations.

== See also ==
- List of mountains and hills of Russia
