= Ekimchan =

Ekimchan Экимчан
- Work settlement
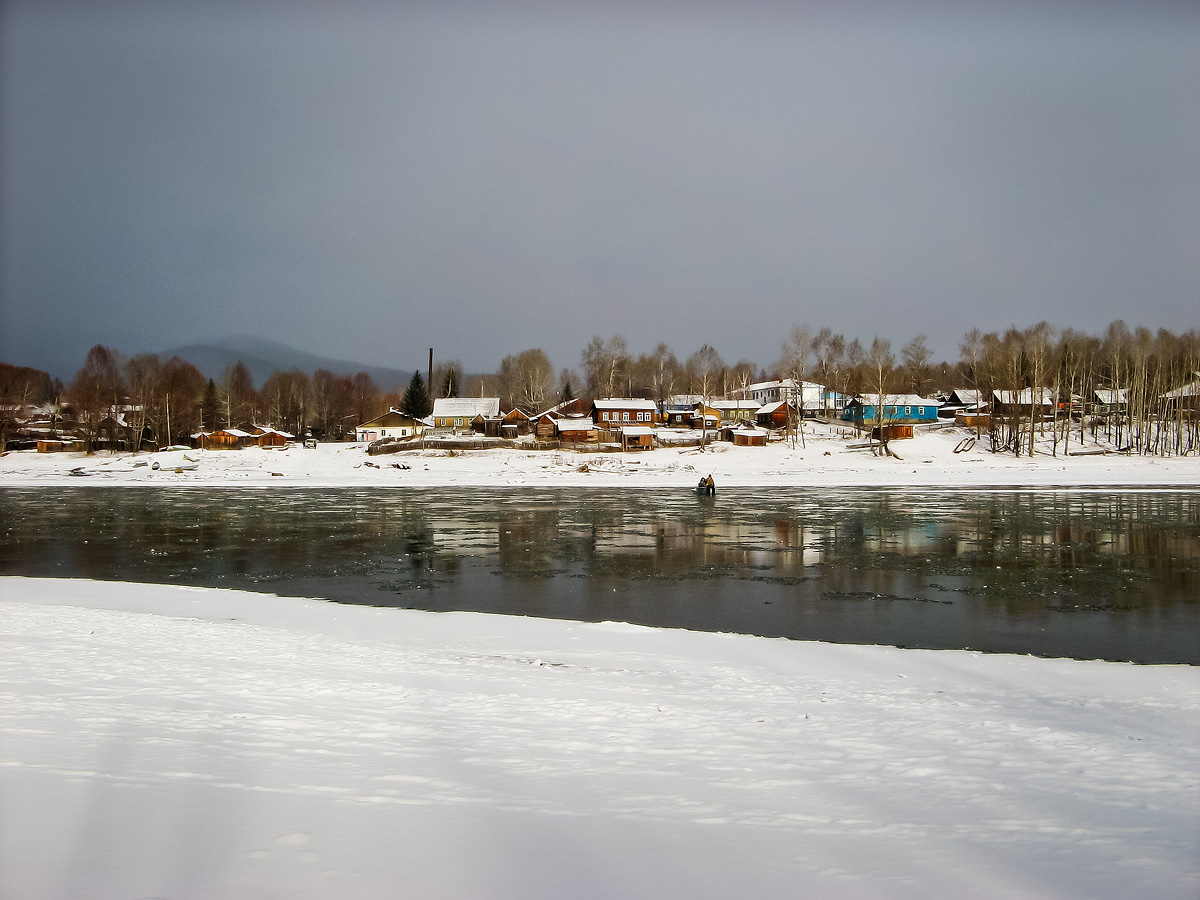
- Interactive map of Ekimchan
- Location of Ekimchan Ekimchan (Amur Oblast)
- Coordinates: 53°04′N 132°56′E
- Country: Russia
- Federal subject: Amur Oblast
- Administrative district: Selemdzhinsky District
- Founded: 1882 (Julian)
- Elevation: 466 m (1,529 ft)

Population (2010 Census)
  - Total: 1,212
  - Estimate (2025): 712 (−41.3%)

Administrative status
  - Capital of: Selemdzhinsky District
- Time zone: UTC+9 (MSK+6)
- Postal code: 676560
- OKTMO ID: 10645151051

Ekimchan (Russian: Экимча́н) is an urban locality (a work settlement) and the administrative center of Selemdzhinsky District of Amur Oblast, Russia, located on the right bank of the Selemdzha River. Population: 1,212 (2010 census); 1,224 (2002 census); 1,832 (1989 Soviet census).

== Transportation ==
A local road leads west to Koboldo and Stoyba.

Ekimchan is served by the Ekimchan Airport.

== Climate ==
Ekimchan has a subarctic climate (Köppen climate classification Dwc) with dry and bitterly cold winters and warm, wet summers. Owing to its location on the cold eastern flank of the Siberian High, Ekimchan has an exceptionally cold climate for its latitude: winters are as much as 35 °C (63 °F) colder than Manchester at approximately the same latitude in the United Kingdom, and about as cold as Alert, Nunavut twenty-nine degrees of latitude further north. Winters are so severe that Ekimchan has never recorded an above-freezing temperature between 23 November and 19 February inclusive. Summers are short but warm, humid and sometimes extremely wet: as much as 407 millimetres or 16.02 inches of rain fell in the wettest month of August 1982, and 96.7 millimetres or 3.81 inches on the wettest day of 18 July, 1939.

The hottest temperature on record is 34.9 °C (94.8 °F) on 8 July of 2017, and the coldest −53.4 °C (−64.1 °F) on 11 January 1931. January 1931 was the coldest month, not getting above −25.3 °C (−13.5 °F) and averaging −39.3 °C (−38.7 °F), whilst July 2011 has been the hottest with an average of 20.3 °C (68.5 °F).

Climate data for Ekimchan
Month	Jan	Feb	Mar	Apr	May	Jun	Jul	Aug	Sep	Oct	Nov	Dec	Year
Record high °C (°F)	−3.4 (25.9)	0.8 (33.4)	12.0 (53.6)	23.7 (74.7)	31.6 (88.9)	34.2 (93.6)	34.9 (94.8)	33.2 (91.8)	28.6 (83.5)	22.0 (71.6)	8.6 (47.5)	−1.2 (29.8)	34.9 (94.8)
Mean daily maximum °C (°F)	−24.6 (−12.3)	−15.6 (3.9)	−5.1 (22.8)	4.5 (40.1)	14.0 (57.2)	21.6 (70.9)	24.5 (76.1)	21.6 (70.9)	14.5 (58.1)	3.3 (37.9)	−12.4 (9.7)	−24.4 (−11.9)	1.8 (35.2)
Daily mean °C (°F)	−30.6 (−23.1)	−24.2 (−11.6)	−14.0 (6.8)	−2.3 (27.9)	7.0 (44.6)	14.1 (57.4)	17.8 (64.0)	15.6 (60.1)	8.7 (47.7)	−2.7 (27.1)	−18.1 (−0.6)	−29.4 (−20.9)	−4.8 (23.4)
Mean daily minimum °C (°F)	−36.6 (−33.9)	−32.7 (−26.9)	−22.8 (−9.0)	−9.1 (15.6)	0.0 (32.0)	6.6 (43.9)	11.1 (52.0)	9.6 (49.3)	2.8 (37.0)	−8.0 (17.6)	−23.7 (−10.7)	−34.3 (−29.7)	−11.4 (11.5)
Record low °C (°F)	−53.4 (−64.1)	−50.0 (−58.0)	−40.9 (−41.6)	−36.6 (−33.9)	−18.0 (−0.4)	−5.4 (22.3)	−2.5 (27.5)	−2.3 (27.9)	−11.7 (10.9)	−30.7 (−23.3)	−43.2 (−45.8)	−51.7 (−61.1)	−53.4 (−64.1)
Average precipitation mm (inches)	7.0 (0.28)	5.7 (0.22)	11.4 (0.45)	33.4 (1.31)	63.3 (2.49)	93.3 (3.67)	140.8 (5.54)	149.0 (5.87)	90.4 (3.56)	45.3 (1.78)	24.8 (0.98)	12.5 (0.49)	676.9 (26.64)
Average extreme snow depth cm (inches)	37 (15)	41 (16)	42 (17)	18 (7.1)	1 (0.4)	0 (0)	0 (0)	0 (0)	0 (0)	5 (2.0)	24 (9.4)	32 (13)	42 (17)
Average precipitation days (≥ 0.1 mm)	9.9	7.5	8.2	10.5	12.4	14.6	15.3	16.4	14.8	12.8	15.3	14.0	151.7
Average snowy days	15	12	12	8	2	0	0	0	1	10	21	19	100
Average relative humidity (%)	78.3	75.4	71.3	66.7	65.2	71.2	76.7	82.4	81.6	81.5	84.3	79.8	76.2
Mean monthly sunshine hours	137	177	217	200	216	231	223	179	137	128	107	101	2,053
Source 1: climatebase.ru (1915–2012)
Source 2: pogoda.ru.net (May to July record highs, snow)
