= Selemdzha =

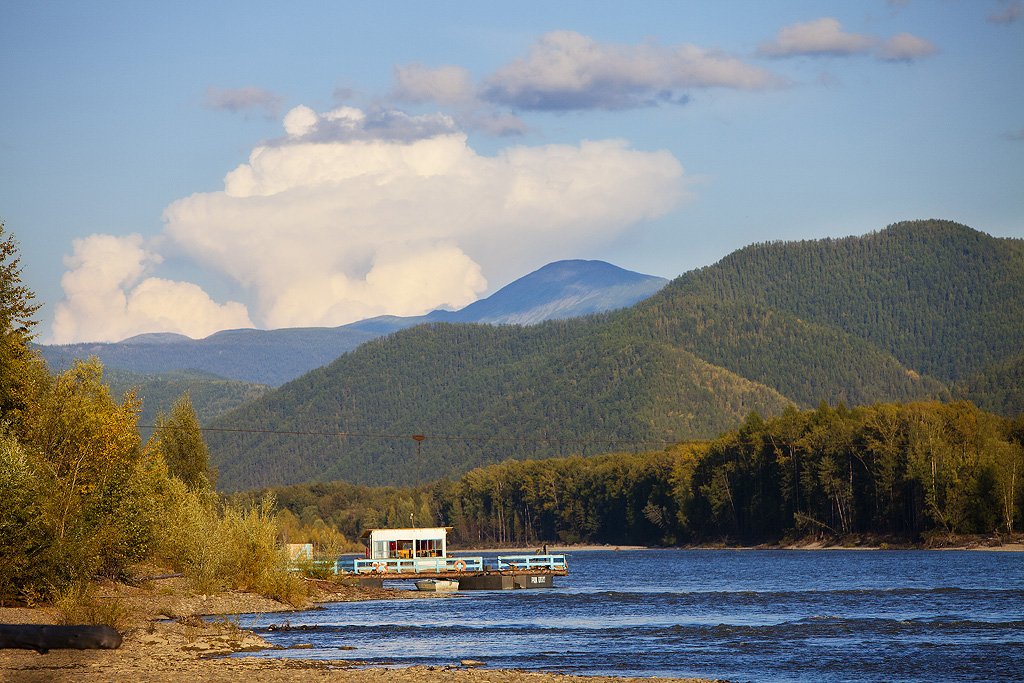
- View of the river near Ekimchan

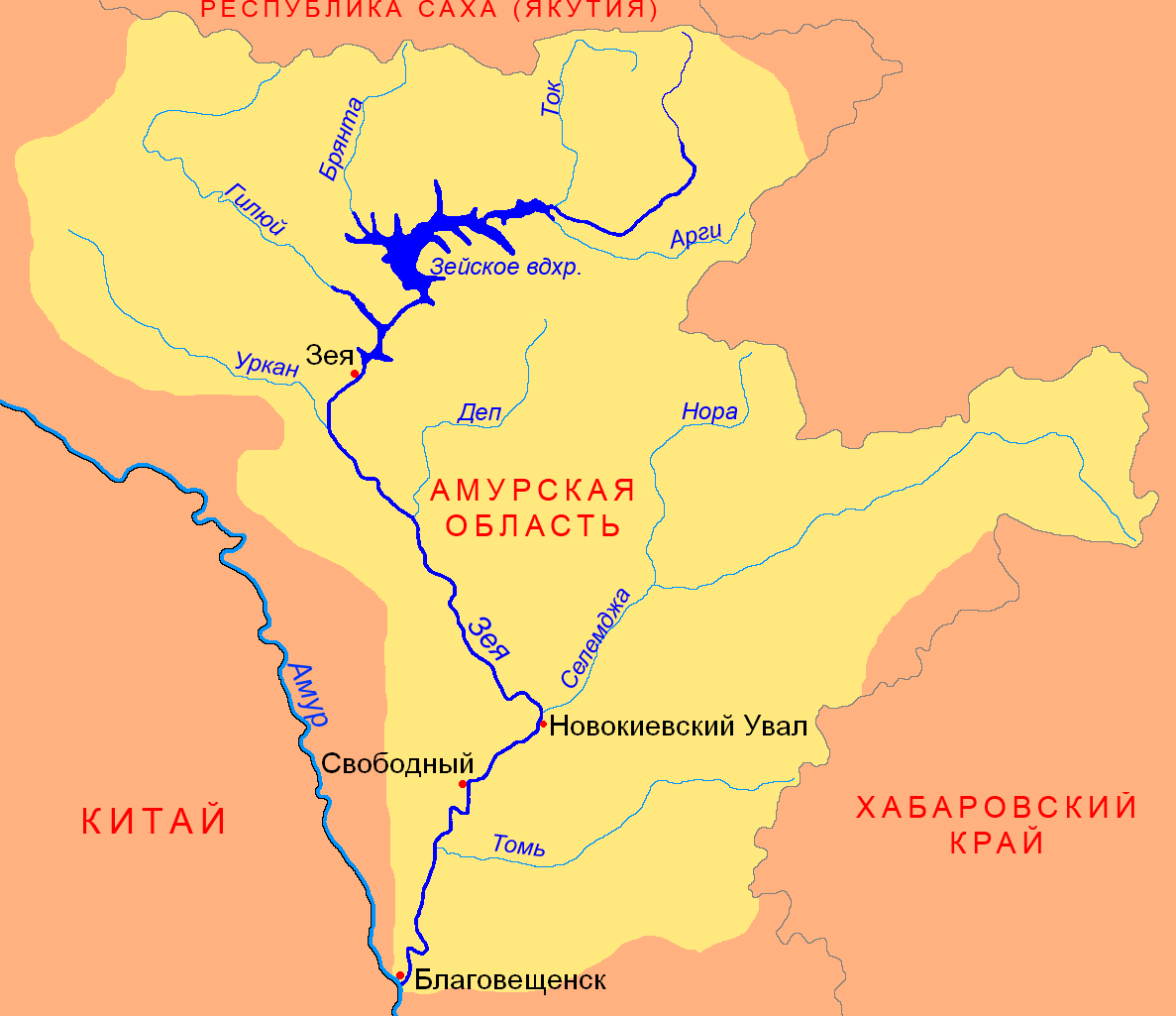
- Zeya basin
- Native name: Селемджа (Russian)

Location
- Country: Russia

Physical characteristics
- Source: Bureya Range
  - coordinates: 52°26′18″N 134°36′30″E
  - elevation: 1,550 m (5,090 ft)
- Mouth: Zeya
  - coordinates: 51°43′58″N 128°51′53″E
  - elevation: 155 m (509 ft)
- Length: 647 km (402 mi)
- Basin size: 68,600 km^{2} (26,500 sq mi)

Basin features
- Progression: Zeya→ Amur→ Sea of Okhotsk

The Selemdzha (Russian: Селемджа) is a river in the Amur Region of Russia. It is the biggest, left tributary of the Zeya. The length of the river is 647 kilometres or 402 miles, and the area of its basin 68,600 square kilometres or 26,500 square miles.

== Course ==
The Selemdzha has its source where three mountain ranges meet the Bureya Range, the Dusse-Alin from the south, the Ezop Range from the west and the Yam-Alin from the north, and flows first northwest with the Selemdzha Range to the north, and then westwards across the Zeya-Bureya Plain. The Baikal–Amur Mainline crosses the river just west of Fevralsk and reaches the Zeya north of the Trans-Siberian Railway and Blagoveshchensk.

Its main tributaries are the Ulma and Byssa on the left, as well as the Nora and Orlovka (Mamyn) on the right. The Selemdzha freezes up in early November and stays under the ice until early May.

== See also ==
- List of rivers of Russia
