= Novokiyevsky Uval =

Rural locality in Mazanovsky District, Amur Oblast, Russia

Coordinates: 51.665°N 128.920°E

Novokiyevsky Uval (Russian: Новоки́евский Ува́л) is a rural locality (a selo) and the administrative center of Mazanovsky District of Amur Oblast, Russia. Population: 4,315 (2010 census); 4,730 (2002 census); 5,530 (1989 Soviet census).
