= Mazanovsky District =

Mazanovsky District Мазановский район
- District
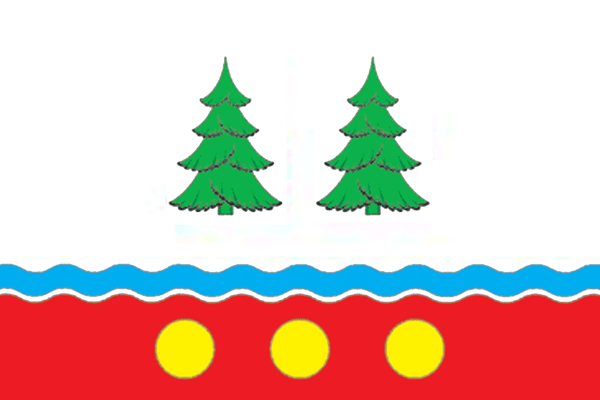
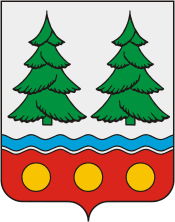
- Flag Coat of arms
- Location of Mazanovsky District in Amur Oblast
- Coordinates: 51°40′N 128°55′E
- Country: Russia
- Federal subject: Amur Oblast
- Established: 1926
- Administrative center: Novokiyevsky Uval

Area
  - Total: 28,316 km^{2} (10,933 sq mi)

Population (2010 Census)
  - Total: 14,803
  - Density: 0.52278/km^{2} (1.3540/sq mi)
  - Urban: 0%
  - Rural: 100%

Administrative structure
  - Administrative divisions: 13 Rural settlements
  - Inhabited localities: 40 rural localities

Municipal structure
  - Municipally incorporated as: Mazanovsky Municipal District
  - Municipal divisions: 0 urban settlements, 13 rural settlements
- Time zone: UTC+9 (MSK+6)
- OKTMO ID: 10632000
- Website: http://mazadm.ru

Mazanovsky District (Russian: Маза́новский райо́н) is an administrative and municipal district (raion), one of the twenty in Amur Oblast, Russia. The area of the district is 28,316 square kilometers (10,933 sq mi). Its administrative center is the rural locality (a selo) of Novokiyevsky Uval. Population: 14,803 (2010 Census); 16,028 (2002 Census); 20,393 (1989 Soviet census). The population of Novokiyevsky Uval accounts for 29.2% of the district's total population.

== Geography ==
River Selemdzha and its tributaries Ulma and Orlovka flow across the district.

== Villages and settlements ==
- Abaykan
