= Administrative divisions of Amur Oblast =

Divisions of Amur Oblast, Russia

Amur Oblast Russia
- Administrative center: Blagoveshchensk

Administrative structure (as of 2015)
- Administrative districts: 20
- Cities/towns: 10
- Urban‑type settlements: 18
- Selsovets: 250
- Rural localities: 608

Municipal structure (as of 2002)
- Rural settlements: 608

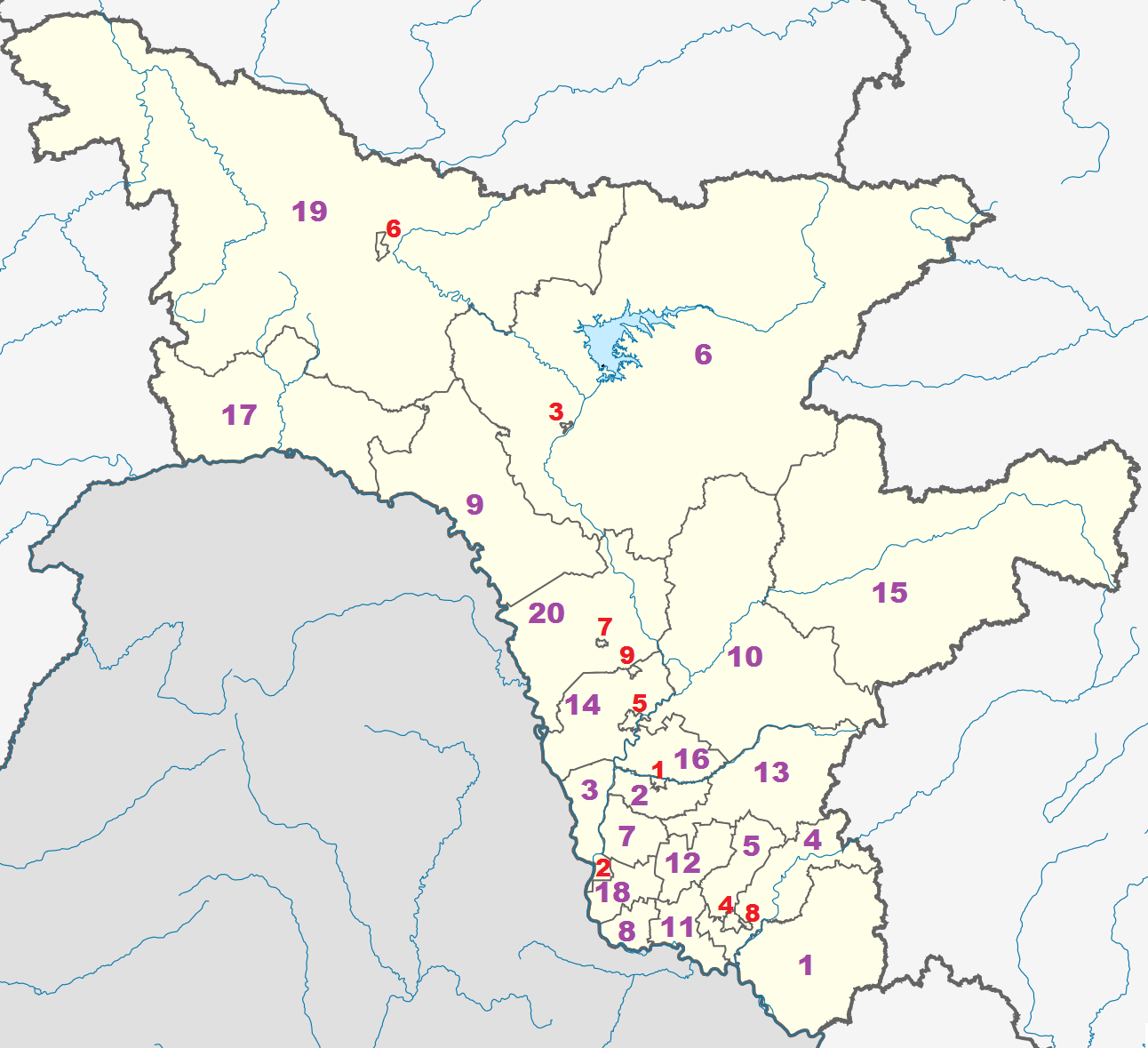
Map of the administrative divisions of Amur Oblast

== Administrative and municipal divisions ==
Map
- ※ - under the oblast's jurisdiction

Division	Structure		OKATO	OKTMO	Urban-type settlement/ district-level town*	Rural (selsovet)
Division	Administrative	Municipal	OKATO	OKTMO	Urban-type settlement/ district-level town*	Rural (selsovet)
Tsiolkovsky (Циолковский)	city (ZATO)	urban okrug	10 545	10 770		
Blagoveshchensk (Благовещенск)	city	urban okrug	10 401	10 701		
Belogorsk (Белогорск)	city	urban okrug	10 410	10 710	Novoraychikhinsk (Новорайчихинск)	
Zeya (Зея)	city	urban okrug	10 412	10 712		
Raychikhinsk (Райчихинск)	city	urban okrug	10 420	10 720		
Svobodny (Свободный)	city	urban okrug	10 430	10 730		
Tynda (Тында)	city	urban okrug	10 432	10 732		
Shimanovsk (Шимановск)	city	urban okrug	10 440	10 740		
Progress (Прогресс)	urban-type settlement※	urban okrug	10 465	10 775		
Arkharinsky (Архаринский)	district		10 205	10 605	Arkhara (Архара)	15
Belogorsky (Белогорский)	district		10 208	10 608		13
Blagoveshchensky (Благовещенский)	district		10 211	10 611		11
Bureysky (Бурейский)	district		10 215	10 615	Bureya (Бурея); Novobureysky (Новобурейский); Talakan (Талакан)	8
Zavitinsky (Завитинский)	district		10 221	10 621	Zavitinsk (Завитинск) town*	9
Zeysky (Зейский)	district		10 225	10 625		21
Ivanovsky (Ивановский)	district		10 228	10 628		15
Konstantinovsky (Константиновский)	district		10 230	10 630		14
Magdagachinsky (Магдагачинский)	district		10 231	10 631	Magdagachi (Магдагачи); Sivaki (Сиваки); Ushumun (Ушумун)	8
Mazanovsky (Мазановский)	district		10 232	10 632		15
Mikhaylovsky (Михайловский)	district		10 235	10 635		11
Oktyabrsky (Октябрьский)	district		10 238	10 638		15
Romnensky (Ромненский)	district		10 240	10 640		10
Svobodnensky (Свободненский)	district		10 242	10 642		15
Selemdzhinsky (Селемджинский)	district		10 245	10 645	Ekimchan (Экимчан); Fevralsk (Февральск); Koboldo (Коболдо); Ogodzha (Огоджа); Tokur (Токур); Zlatoustovsk (Златоустовск)	4
Seryshevsky (Серышевский)	district		10 247	10 647	Seryshevo (Серышево)	15
Skovorodinsky (Сковородинский)	district		10 249	10 649	Skovorodino (Сковородино) town*; Urusha (Уруша); Yerofey Pavlovich (Ерофей Павлович)	6
Tambovsky (Тамбовский)	district		10 251	10 651		13
Tyndinsky (Тындинский)	district		10 254	10 654		20
Shimanovsky (Шимановский)	district		10 255	10 655		13
