= Pioner, Amur Oblast =

Pioner Пионер
- Selo
- Location within Amur Oblast Location within Russia
- Coordinates: 53°29′N 126°27′E
- Country: Russia
- Region: Amur Oblast
- District: Magdagachinsky District
- Time zone: UTC+9:00

Pioner (Russian: Пионер) is a rural locality (a selo) in Daktuyskoye Rural Settlement of Magdagachinsky District, Amur Oblast, Russia. The population was 30 as of 2018.

== Geography ==
Pioner is located northeast of the Amur–Zeya Plain, 70 km east of Magdagachi (the district's administrative centre) by road. Aprelsky is the nearest rural locality.
