= Kisly =

Kisly (Belarusian: Кіслы; Russian: Кислый; Ukrainian: Кислий, Kysly) is a surname derived from the nickname literally meaning "sour" (in the mood). Notable people with the surname include:

- Artyom Kisly (born 1989), Belarusian ice hockey player
- Aleksandr Kisly (born 1974), Russian footballer
- Mykyta Kysly, Ukraininan footballer

== See also ==
- Kisly Klyuch
- Kislyak
- Kislyakov
