= Gudachi =

Gudachi Гудачи
- Settlement
- Location within Amur Oblast Location within Russia
- Coordinates: 53°41′N 125°13′E
- Country: Russia
- Region: Amur Oblast
- District: Magdagachinsky District
- Time zone: UTC+9:00

Gudachi (Russian: Гудачи) is a rural locality (a settlement) and the administrative center of Gudachinskoye Rural Settlement of Magdagachinsky District, Amur Oblast, Russia. The population was 372 as of 2018. There are 9 streets.

== Geography ==
Gudachi is located on northwest on the Amur–Zeya Plain, 55 km northwest of Magdagachi (the district's administrative centre) by road. Gonzha is the nearest rural locality.
