= Gonzha =

Gonzha Гонжа
- Selo
- Location within Amur Oblast Location within Russia
- Coordinates: 53°34′N 125°22′E
- Country: Russia
- Region: Amur Oblast
- District: Magdagachinsky District
- Time zone: UTC+9:00

Gonzha (Russian: Гонжа) is a rural locality (a selo) and the administrative center of Gonzhinskoye Rural Settlement of Magdagachinsky District, Amur Oblast, Russia. The population was 735 as of 2018. There are 13 streets.

== Geography ==
Gonzha is located on northwest of the Amur–Zeya Plain, 40 km northwest of Magdagachi (the district's administrative centre) by road. Gudachi is the nearest rural locality.
