= Chalgany =

Chalgany Чалганы
- Selo
- Location within Amur Oblast Location within Russia
- Coordinates: 52°57′N 126°26′E
- Country: Russia
- Region: Amur Oblast
- District: Magdagachinsky District
- Time zone: UTC+9:00

Chalgany (Russian: Чалганы) is a rural locality (a selo) in Chalgansky Selsoviet of Magdagachinsky District, Amur Oblast, Russia. The population was 406 as of 2018. There are 7 streets.

== Geography ==
Chalgany is located 98 km southeast of Magdagachi (the district's administrative centre) by road. Tygda is the nearest rural locality.
