= Yuktali =

Yuktali Юктали
- Settlement
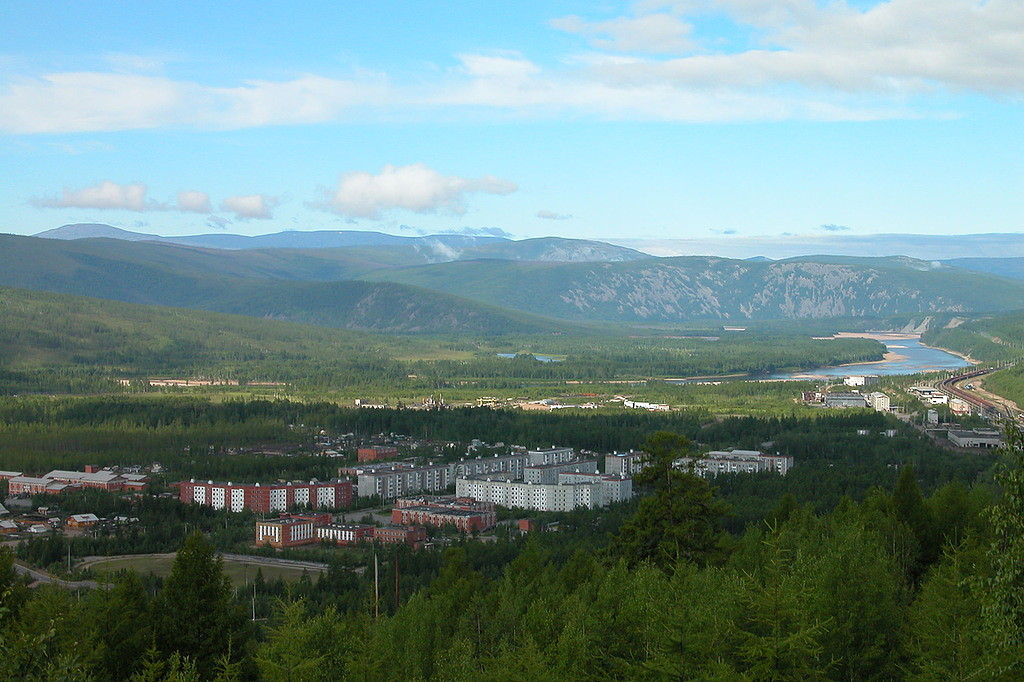

- Location within Amur Oblast Location within Russia
- Coordinates: 56°35′N 121°38′E
- Country: Russia
- Region: Amur Oblast
- District: Tyndinsky District
- Time zone: UTC+9:00

Yuktali (Russian: Юктали) is a rural locality (a settlement) Yuktalinsky Selsoviet of Tyndinsky District, Amur Oblast, Russia. The population was 1,240 as of 2018. There are 28 streets.

== Geography ==
Yuktali is located on the Nyukzha River, 344 km northwest of Tynda (the district's administrative centre) by road. Ust-Nyukzha is the nearest rural locality.
