= Kisly Klyuch =

Kisly Klyuch Кислый Ключ
- Selo
- Location within Amur Oblast Location within Russia
- Coordinates: 53°39′N 125°24′E
- Country: Russia
- Region: Amur Oblast
- District: Magdagachinsky District
- Time zone: UTC+9:00

Kisly Klyuch (Russian: Кислый Ключ) is a rural locality (a selo) in Gonzhinskoye Rural Settlement of Magdagachinsky District, Amur Oblast, Russia. The population was 24 as of 2018.

== Geography ==
Kisly Klyuch is located on northwest on the Amur–Zeya Plain, 46 km northwest of Magdagachi (the district's administrative centre) by road. Gonzha is the nearest rural locality.
