= Kuvykta =

Kuvykta Кувыкта
- Settlement
- Location within Amur Oblast Location within Russia
- Coordinates: 55°11′N 124°12′E
- Country: Russia
- Region: Amur Oblast
- District: Tyndinsky District
- Time zone: UTC+9:00

Kuvykta (Russian: Кувыкта) is a rural locality (a settlement) in Kuvyktinsky Selsoviet of Tyndinsky District, Amur Oblast, Russia. The population was 278 as of 2018. There is 1 street.

== Geography ==
Kuvykta is located 43 km west of Tynda (the district's administrative centre) by road. Kuryan is the nearest rural locality.
