= Murtygit =

Murtygit Муртыгит
- Settlement
- Location within Amur Oblast Location within Russia
- Coordinates: 54°25′N 123°51′E
- Country: Russia
- Region: Amur Oblast
- District: Tyndinsky District
- Time zone: UTC+9:00

Murtygit (Russian: Муртыгит) is a rural locality (a settlement) in Murtygitsky Selsoviet of Tyndinsky District, Amur Oblast, Russia. The population was 340, as of 2018. There are 3 streets.

== Geography ==
Murtygit is located 126 km southwest of Tynda (the district's administrative centre) by road. Anosovsky is the nearest rural locality.
