= Nyukzha =

River in East Siberia

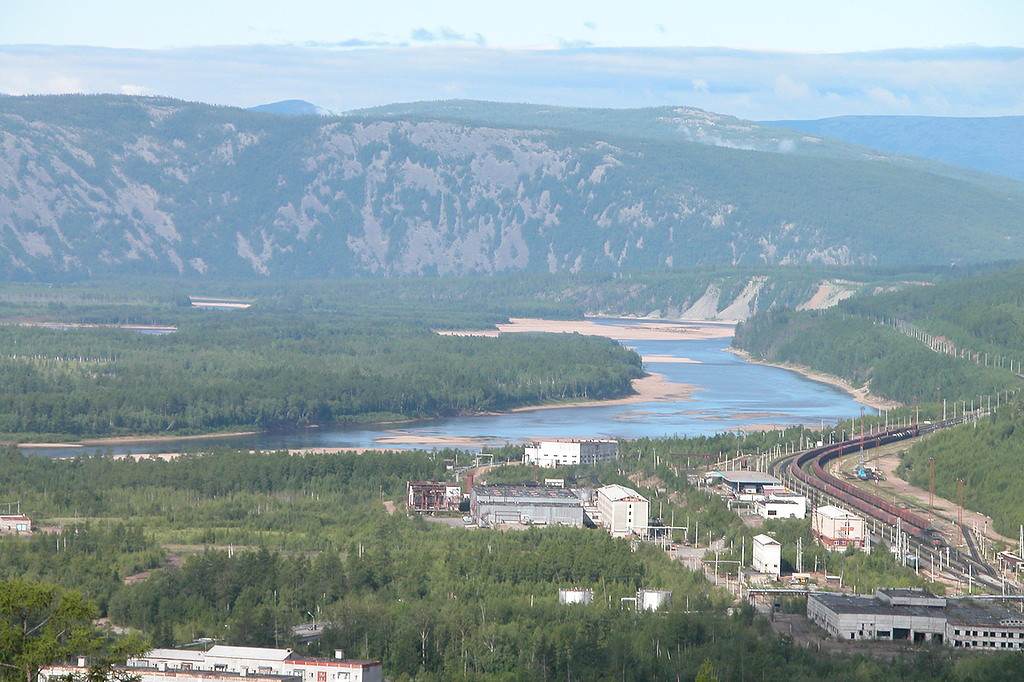
- View of the Nyukzha river at Yuktali

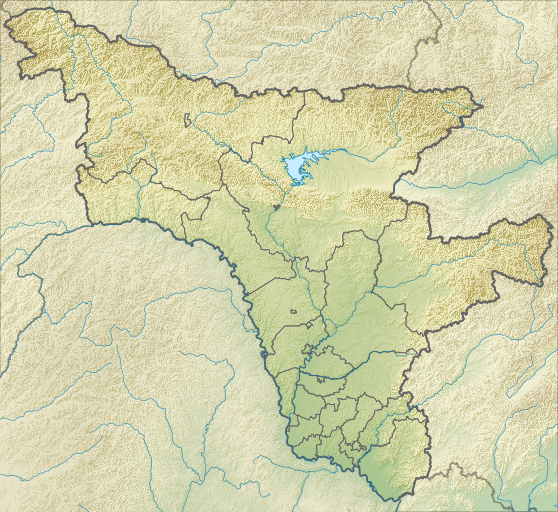
- Mouth location in Amur Oblast, Russia

Location
- Country: Russia
- Federal subject: Amur Oblast, Zabaykalsky Krai

Physical characteristics
- Source: Nyukzha Ridge; Olyokma Stanovik
  - coordinates: 54°31′54″N 121°47′31″E
  - elevation: 1,070 m (3,510 ft)
- Mouth: Olyokma
  - location: Near Ust-Nyukzha
  - coordinates: 56°34′35″N 121°33′10″E
  - elevation: 397 m (1,302 ft)
- Length: 583 km (362 mi)
- Basin size: 32,100 km^{2} (12,400 sq mi)
- Discharge
  - average: 310 m^{3}/s (11,000 cu ft/s)

Basin features
- Progression: Olyokma→ Lena→ Laptev Sea

The Nyukzha (Russian: Нюкжа) is a river in Amur Oblast and Transbaikalia, East Siberia, Russian Federation. It is the second largest tributary of the Olyokma river in terms of length and area of its basin. The Nyukzha is 583 kilometres (362 mi) long and has a drainage basin of 32,100 square kilometres (12,400 sq mi). There are a number of inhabited places close to the banks of the river, including Ust-Urkima, Lopcha, Chilchi, Ust-Nyukzha, Larba and Yuktali, mostly with a significant Evenk population. A section of the Baikal–Amur Mainline passes along the river valley. The river is a destination for rafting.

There are rock paintings of the Early Iron Age by the right bank of the Nyukzha and 214 km (133 mi) from its mouth, near the confluence with the Onen river.

The name of the river originated in the Evenki word "nyukzhach", meaning "to wander".

== Course ==
The Nyukzha is a right tributary of the Olyokma, of the Lena basin. Its source is in Zabaykalsky Krai, in the northern slope of the Nyukzha ridge, a spur of the Urushin Range, of the Olyokma-Stanovik Highlands. In its upper course through the highlands it flows fast, forming numerous rapids. It goes roughly northeastwards leaving the Chernyshev Range on the right through a narrow valley. Then it bends and changes to a northwestward direction. Farther downstream the Nyukzha slows down, divides into arms, and forms meanders. Finally it joins the right bank of the Olyokma 187 km (116 mi) from this river's mouth in the Lena.

The Nyukzha has numerous tributaries and seven of them are over 100 km (62 mi) long. The longest one is the 243 km (151 mi) long Lopcha (Лопча) from the left. The river freezes in October and stays under ice until late April or early May.

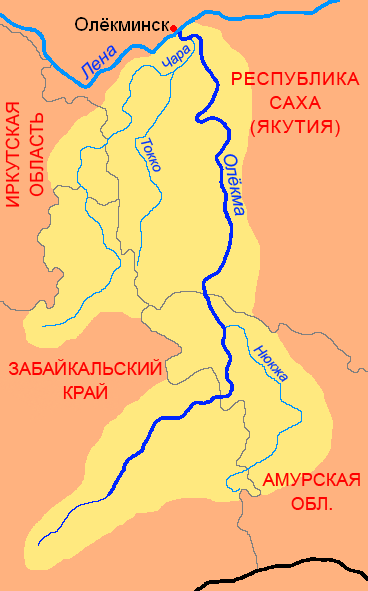
Olyokma basin with the Nyukzha in the lower right.

== See also ==
- List of rivers of Russia
- Tyndinsky District
