= Urkan =

Urkan Уркан
- Selo
- Location within Amur Oblast Location within Russia
- Coordinates: 54°08′N 124°39′E
- Country: Russia
- Region: Amur Oblast
- District: Tyndinsky District
- Time zone: UTC+9:00

Urkan (Russian: Уркан) is a rural locality (a selo) and the administrative center of Urkansky Selsoviet of Tyndinsky District, Amur Oblast, Russia. The population was 777 in 2018. There are 19 streets.

== Geography ==
Urkan is located 147 km (91 mi) south of Tynda (the district's administrative centre) by road. Bugorki is the nearest rural locality.
