= Chilchi =

Chilchi Чильчи
- Settlement
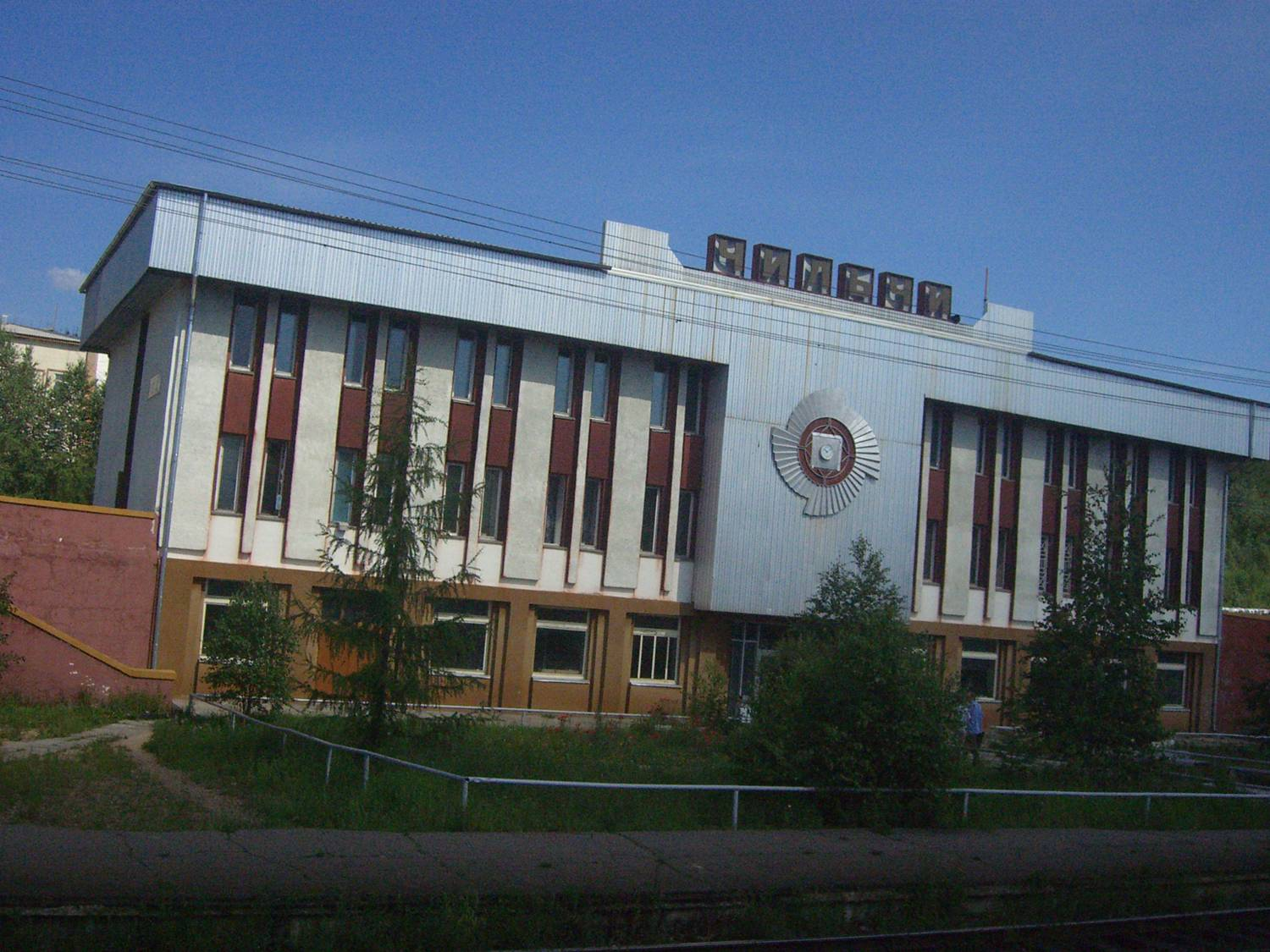
- Chilchi railway station

- Location within Amur Oblast Location within Russia
- Coordinates: 55°59′N 122°25′E
- Country: Russia
- Region: Amur Oblast
- District: Tyndinsky District
- Time zone: UTC+9:00

Chilchi (Russian: Чильчи) is a rural locality (a settlement) and the administrative center of Chilchinsky Selsoviet of Tyndinsky District, Amur Oblast, Russia. The population was 190 as of 2018. There are 2 streets.

== Geography ==
Chilchi is located on the Nyukzha river, 232 km northwest of Tynda (the district's administrative centre) by road. Lopcha is the nearest rural locality.
