= Chernyaevo =

Chernyaevo Черняево
- Selo
- Location within Amur Oblast Location within Russia
- Coordinates: 52°47′N 125°59′E
- Country: Russia
- Region: Amur Oblast
- District: Magdagachinsky District
- Time zone: UTC+9:00

Chernyaevo (Russian: Черняево) is a rural locality (a selo) and the administrative center of Chernyaevsky Selsoviet of Magdagachinsky District, Amur Oblast, Russia. The population was 406 as of 2018. There are 17 streets.

== Geography ==
Chernyaevo is located on the left bank of the Amur River, 120 km south of Magdagachi (the district's administrative centre) by road.
