= Larba =

Larba Ларба
- Settlement
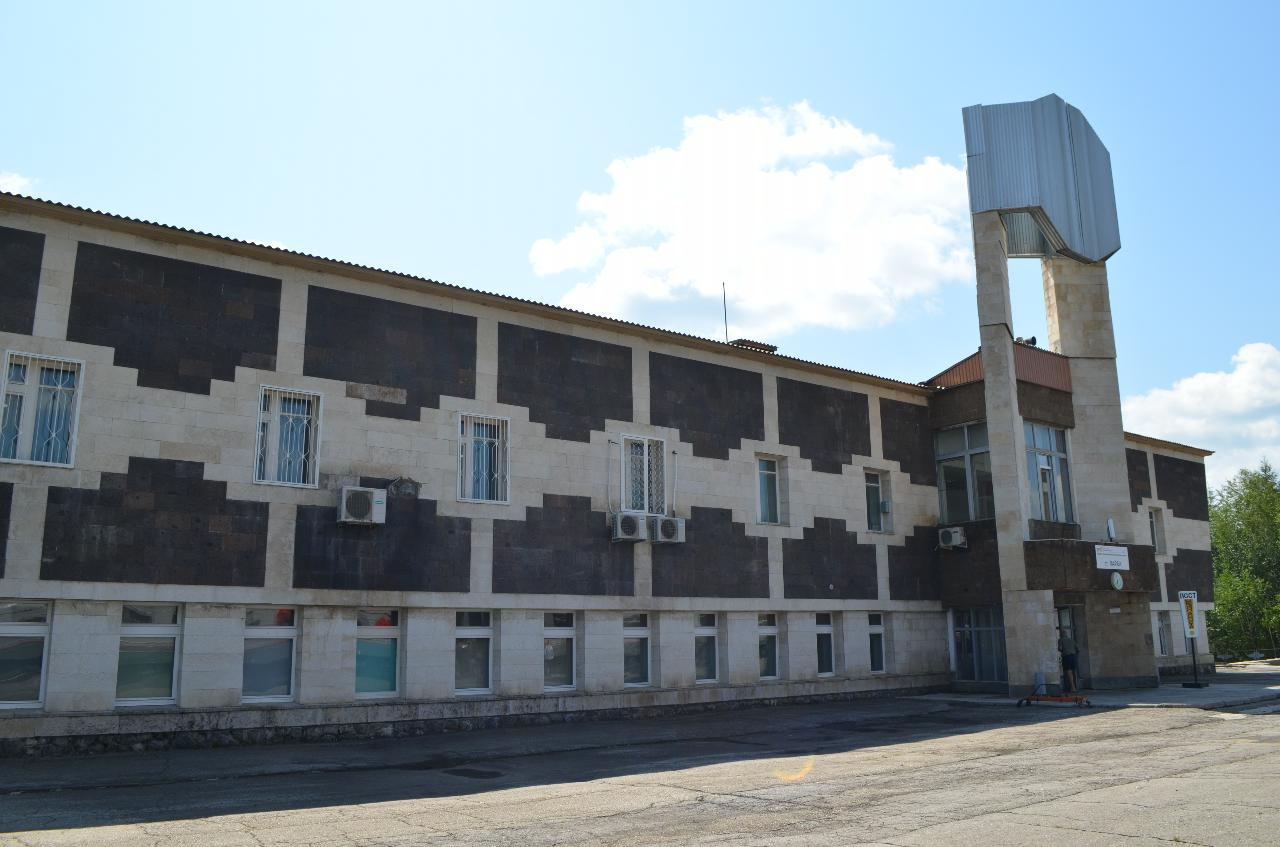
- Larba train station

- Location within Amur Oblast Location within Russia
- Coordinates: 55°30′N 123°07′E
- Country: Russia
- Region: Amur Oblast
- District: Tyndinsky District
- Time zone: UTC+9:00

Larba (Russian: Ларба) is a rural locality (a settlement) in Larbinsky Selsoviet of Tyndinsky District, Amur Oblast, Russia. The population was 416 as of 2018. There are 6 streets.

== Geography ==
Larba is located by the Nyukzha river, 136 km northwest of Tynda (the district's administrative centre) by road. Khorogochi is the nearest rural locality.
