= Tolbuzino =

Tolbuzino Толбузино
- Selo
- Location within Amur Oblast Location within Russia
- Coordinates: 53°08′N 125°26′E
- Country: Russia
- Region: Amur Oblast
- District: Magdagachinsky District
- Time zone: UTC+9:00

Tolbuzino (Russian: Толбузино) is a rural locality (a selo) and the administrative center of Talbuzinskoye Rural Settlement of Magdagachinsky District, Amur Oblast, Russia. The population was 178 as of 2018. There are 2 streets.

== Geography ==
Tolbuzino is located 50 km southwest of Magdagachi (the district's administrative centre) by road. Magdagachi is the nearest rural locality.
