= Daktuy =

Daktuy Дактуй
- Selo
- Location within Amur Oblast Location within Russia
- Coordinates: 53°20′N 126°10′E
- Country: Russia
- Region: Amur Oblast
- District: Magdagachinsky District
- Time zone: UTC+9:00

Daktuy (Russian: Дактуй) is a rural locality (a selo) and the administrative center of Daktuyskoye Rural Settlement of Magdagachinsky District, Amur Oblast, Russia. The population was 590 as of 2018. There are 14 streets.

== Geography ==
Daktuy is located 42 km southeast of Magdagachi (the district's administrative centre) by road. Magdagachi is the nearest rural locality.
