= Dipkun =

Settlement in Tyndinsky District, Amur Oblast, Russia

Coordinates: 55°07′52″N 126°46′37″E

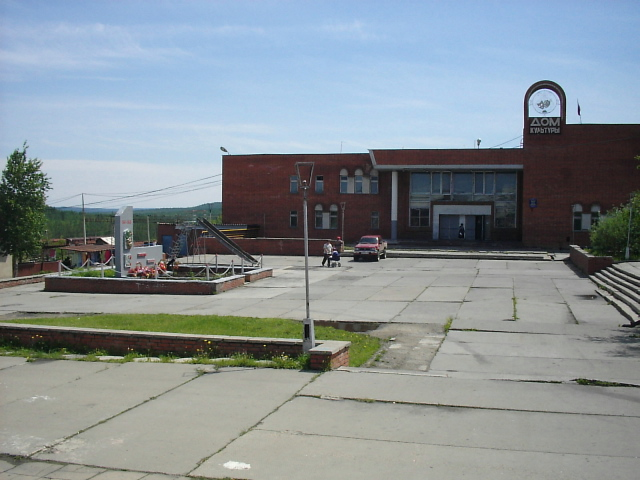
A square in Dipkun

Dipkun (Russian: Дипкун) is a settlement in Tyndinsky District of Amur Oblast, Russia, located 162 kilometers (101 mi) east of Tynda on the Baikal Amur Mainline (BAM).

The settlement was founded in 1975 with the construction of the BAM, built by Komsomol brigades from around Moscow. The name of the settlement comes from the Evenk word for the number eight.

While Dipkun is located on the same latitude as Moscow, its climate is far more severe, with long, cold winters.

A 2011 report from Vice News noted that there were settlements on the outskirts of Dipkun that were used by North Korean laborers. These have since been demolished and relocated elsewhere in Amur Oblast.
