= Aprelsky =

Aprelsky Апрельский
- Settlement
- Location within Amur Oblast Location within Russia
- Coordinates: 53°29′N 126°16′E
- Country: Russia
- Region: Amur Oblast
- District: Magdagachinsky District
- Time zone: UTC+9:00

Aprelsky (Russian: Апрельский) is a rural locality (a settlement) in Daktuyskoye Rural Settlement of Magdagachinsky District, Amur Oblast, Russia. The population was 245 as of 2018.

== Geography ==
Aprelsky is located 58 km east of Magdagachi (the district's administrative centre) by road. Pioner is the nearest rural locality.
