= Ust'-Nyukzha =

Ust'-Nyukzha Усть-Нюкжа
- Inhabited locality
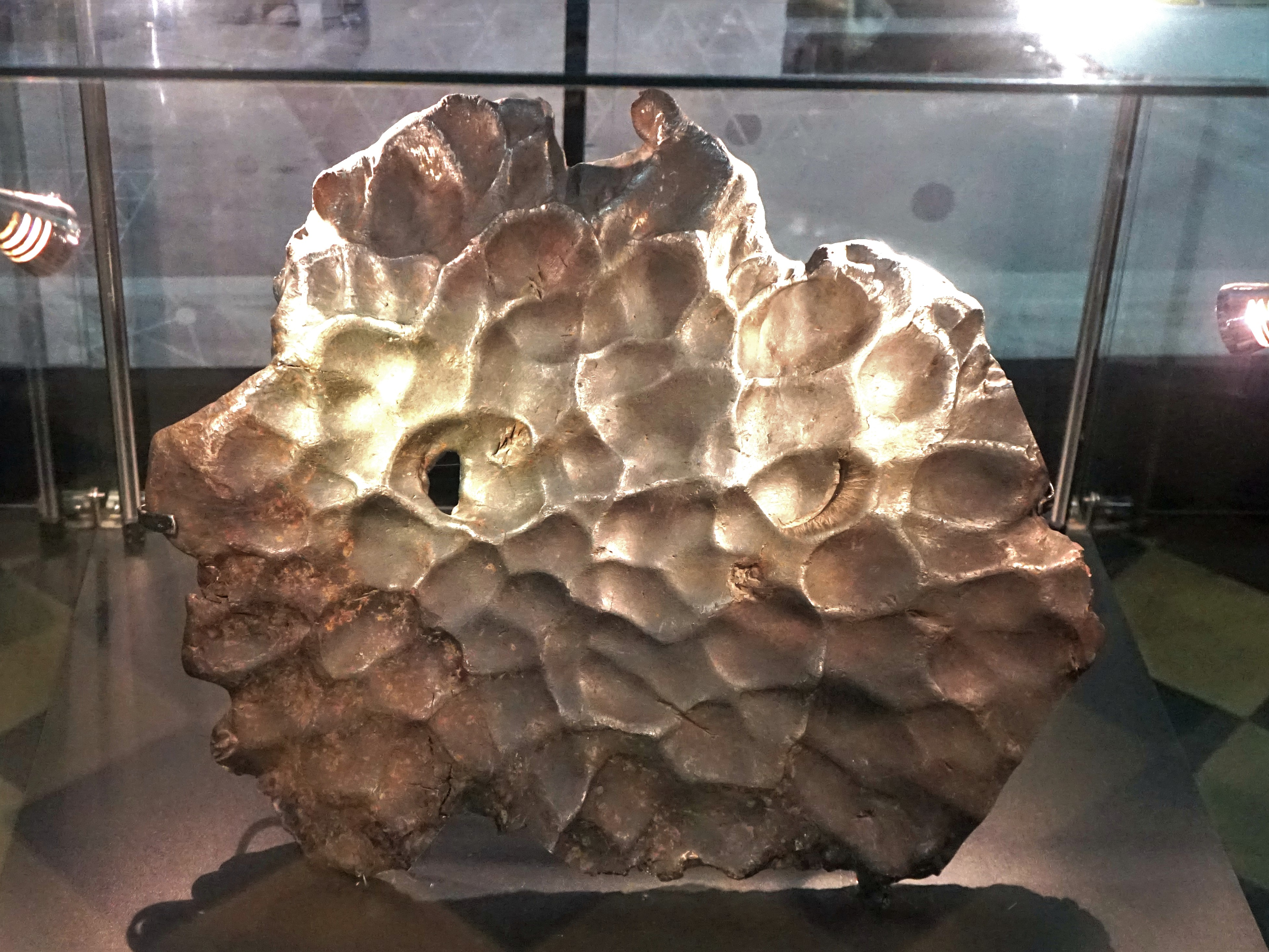
- Ust-Nyukzha Meteorite
- Interactive map of Ust'-Nyukzha
- Location of Ust'-Nyukzha Ust'-Nyukzha (Amur Oblast)
- Coordinates: 56°33′N 121°36′E
- Country: Russia
- Federal subject: Amur Oblast
- Founded: 1924

Population (2010 Census)
  - Total: 573
  - Estimate (2018): 573 (0%)

Municipal status
  - Urban okrug: Tyndinsky District
- Time zone: UTC+9 (MSK+6)
- Postal code: 676278
- OKTMO ID: 10654425101

Ust'Nyukzha (Russian:Усть-Нюкжа) is a rural locality (an inhabited locality) located in Tyndinsky District in Amur Oblast, Russia. As of the 2010 census, the population was 573.

== Geography ==
It is located by the Nyukzha river, near its confluence with the Olyokma.
