= Lopcha =

Lopcha Лопча
- Settlement
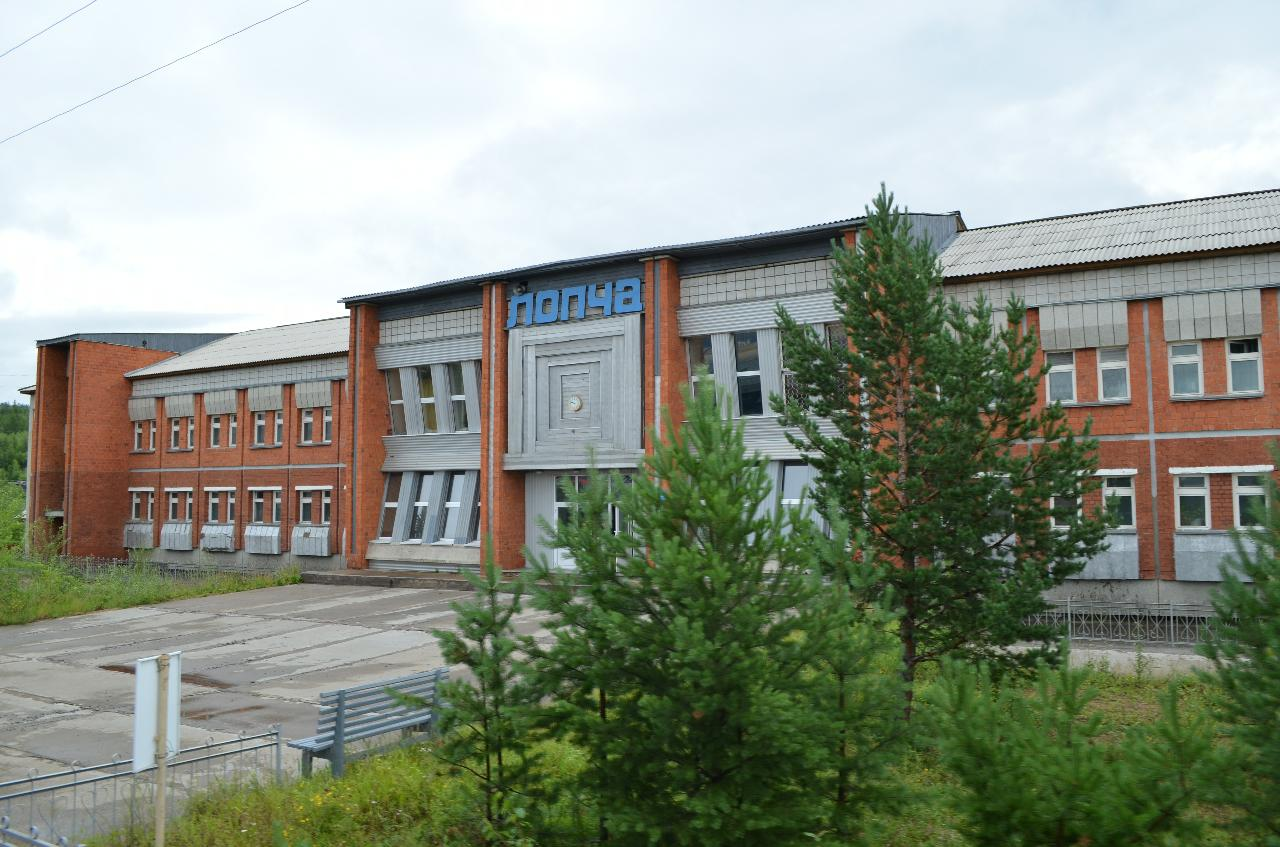
- Lopcha Railway Station

- Location within Amur Oblast Location within Russia
- Coordinates: 55°46′09″N 122°46′31″E
- Country: Russia
- Region: Amur Oblast
- District: Tyndinsky District
- Time zone: UTC+9:00

Lopcha (Russian: Лопча) is a rural locality (a settlement) in Lopchinsky Selsoviet of Tyndinsky District, Amur Oblast, Russia. The population was 401 as of 2018. There are 6 streets.

== Geography ==
Lopcha is located 186 km northwest of Tynda (the district's administrative centre) by road. Larba is the nearest rural locality.
