= Ust-Urkima =

Ust-Urkima Усть-Уркима
- Selo
- Location within Amur Oblast Location within Russia
- Coordinates: 55°18′N 123°09′E
- Country: Russia
- Region: Amur Oblast
- District: Tyndinsky District
- Time zone: UTC+9:00

Ust-Urkima (Russian: Усть-Уркима) is a rural locality (a selo) and the administrative center of Nyukzhinsky Selsoviet of Tyndinsky District, Amur Oblast, Russia. The population was 260 as of 2018. There are 5 streets.

== Geography ==
Ust-Urkima is located 154 km northwest of Tynda (the district's administrative centre) by road. Larba is the nearest rural locality.
