= Sivaki, Russia =

Sivaki Сиваки
- work settlement
- Interactive map of Sivaki
- Location of Sivaki Sivaki (Amur Oblast)
- Coordinates: 52°37′53″N 126°45′01″E
- Country: Russia
- Federal subject: Amur Oblast
- Administrative district: Magdagachinsky District
- Founded: 1906

Population (2010 Census)
  - Total: 2,056
  - Estimate (2025): 1,160 (−43.6%)

Municipal status
  - Municipal district: Magdagachinsky Municipal District
  - Urban settlement: Work Settlement Sivaki Urban Settlement
  - Capital of: Work Settlement Sivaki Urban Settlement
- Time zone: UTC+9 (MSK+6)
- Postal code: 676145
- OKTMO ID: 10631160051

Sivaki (Russian: Сиваки) is an urban locality (a work settlement) in Magdagachinsky District of Amur Oblast, Russia. Population: 2,056 (2010 census); 2,578 (2002 census); 3,721 (1989 Soviet census).
