= Narine Arakelian =

Armenian interdisciplinary contemporary artist

- Born: Narine Robertovna Arakelian; 13 May 1979 (age 47); Tynda, USSR
- Education: State Surikov Institute
- Known for: Feminist Performance Art, Intervention Art, Installation Art, Video art, Environmental Art, Painting, Sculpture
- Notable work: The “Cast Iron Pots and Pans” Public Intervention Art, The “L'illusion du Marriage” Performance Art, The “Lighthouse” Environmental Art, The “Initiation” Installation Art
- Movement: Contemporary art, New media art, Feminist Performance Art, Environmental Art, Art intervention, Generative Art
- Patrons: Aidan Salakhova
- Website: narinearakelian.com

Narine Arakelian (born 13 May 1979) is an Armenian interdisciplinary feminist artist; she works with Performance art, Installation art, Painting, Sculpture, Video art and Environmental art combining Fine Arts and Digital Technologies by using the custom designed Artificial Intelligence (A.I.). The artist creates artworks based on social, cultural and political issues focusing predominantly on social justice and gender identity.

Narine Arakelian is a member of the Russian Union of Artists.

== Biography ==
Narine Arakelian was born on 13 May 1979 in Tynda, USSR. In 2015 she graduated from the State Surikov Institute (Moscow).

Arakelian has participated in a number of international art shows and exhibitions. Since 2015 her artworks were exhibited in international shows within 56th Venice Biennale (2015), 57th Venice Biennale (2017) and 58th International Art Exhibition, La Biennale di Venezia (2019), Manifesta XII in Palermo (2018), as well as she had a series of solo and group exhibitions in Moscow, Berlin, Miami and Los Angeles.

At the 58th Venice Biennale, discussions of the 2018 Armenian Velvet Revolution took place as part of the project Revolutionary Sensor. Arakelyan presented the project Ladle and Pot, in which acts of civil disobedience by Armenian women during the revolution were reenacted in public spaces in Venice.

In 2020, Narine Arakelyan created an Instagram filter to raise awareness during the COVID-19 pandemic. The filter features a golden medical mask with the words “Love and Hope” around it.

== Major Artworks ==
The “Stigmata” Painting (2015)

The “L’Illusion du Marriage” Performance Art (2017)

The "Love is...” Performance Art (2017)

The "Honeymoon” Performance Art (2017)

The "Decommodification Principle” Video Art (2017)

The “Hope” Canvas (2018)

The “Cast Iron Pots and Pans” Public Intervention Art (2019)

The “Lighthouse” Environmental Art (2019)

The “Bloom” Performance Art (2019)

The "Initiation” Installation Art (2019)

The "Rebirth Subconscious” Video Art (2019)

The "Love&Hope” AR Performance Art - LoveXXL360 (2020)

The "Paradise Apple” AR Performance Art - LoveXXL360 (2020)
