= Kivdinsky =

Kivdinsky Кивдинский
- Settlement
- Location within Amur Oblast Location within Russia
- Coordinates: 49°49′N 129°37′E
- Country: Russia
- Region: Amur Oblast
- District: Progress urban okrug
- Time zone: UTC+9:00

Kivdinsky (Russian: Кивдинский) is a rural locality (a settlement) in urban okrug Progress, Amur Oblast, Russia. The population was 14 as of 2018. There are 22 streets.

== Geography ==
Kivdinsky is located in the valley of the Kivda River, 13 km northwest of Progress (the district's administrative centre) by road. Muravka is the nearest rural locality.
