= Ushumun =

Ushumun Ушумун
- work settlement
- Interactive map of Ushumun
- Location of Ushumun Ushumun (Amur Oblast)
- Coordinates: 52°47′10″N 126°32′26″E
- Country: Russia
- Federal subject: Amur Oblast
- Administrative district: Magdagachinsky District
- Founded: 1912
- Elevation: 324 m (1,063 ft)

Population (2010 Census)
  - Total: 2,390
  - Estimate (2025): 1,590 (−33.5%)

Municipal status
  - Municipal district: Magdagachinsky Municipal District
  - Urban settlement: Work Settlement Ushumun Urban Settlement
  - Capital of: Work Settlement Ushumun Urban Settlement
- Time zone: UTC+9 (MSK+6)
- Postal codes: 676105, 676135
- OKTMO ID: 10631170051

Ushumun (Russian: Ушумун) is an urban locality (a work settlement) in Magdagachinsky District of Amur Oblast, Russia. Population: 2,390 (2010 census); 2,920 (2002 census); 3,232 (1989 Soviet census).
