= Kislyakov =

Kislyakov (Russian: Кисляков) is a Russian masculine surname, its feminine counterpart is Kislyakova. It may refer to

- Nikolai Kislyakov (1901–1973), Soviet ethnologist
- Roman Kislyakov (born 1988), Ukrainian football player
- Yevgeny Kislyakov (born 1967), Soviet rower

== See also ==
- Kislyakovo, a rural locality (a village) in Malyginskoye Rural Settlement, Kovrovsky District, Vladimir Oblast, Russia
