= Novoraichikhinsk =

Novoraichikhinsk Новорайчихинск
- Work settlement
- Novoraichikhinsk settlement centre. The centre consists of multiple two-story buildings and two five-story buildings, where most of the population resides
- Interactive map of Novoraichikhinsk
- Location of Novoraichikhinsk Novoraichikhinsk (Amur Oblast)
- Coordinates: 49°47′N 129°34′E
- Country: Russia
- Federal subject: Amur Oblast
- Elevation: 356 m (1,168 ft)

Population (2010 Census)
  - Total: 2,143
  - Estimate (2025): 1,095 (−48.9%)

Administrative status
  - Subordinated to: Progress Urban Okrug

Municipal status
  - Urban okrug: Progress Urban Okrug
- Time zone: UTC+9 (MSK+6)
- Postal code: 676767
- OKTMO ID: 10775000056

Novoraichikhinsk or Novoraychikhinsk is an urban locality (a work settlement) under the administrative jurisdiction of Progress Urban Okrug in Amur Oblast, Russia.

Population: 2,143 (2010 census); 2,948 (2002 census); 3,756 (1989 Soviet census). Estimated to be around 1100 nowadays.

== History ==
Novoraichikhinsk was created in 1946 as a settlement for coal miners, in which many industries, such as a brickworks, a sewing plant, a hospital, and a club, were founded. It was made an urban-type settlement in 1956. After Shock Therapy and the Dissolution of the Soviet Union, the population of Novoraichikhinsk dwindled as people began to urbanise. The coal mine, which the settlement was built around, got abandoned and closed, and the other industries followed. In the 2020s, the government of Amur Oblast invested into the Progress Urban Okrug, and Novoraichikhinsk got renovations, such as a new playground and the Svetly Plaza (Russian: Сквер "Светлый").

== Daily life ==
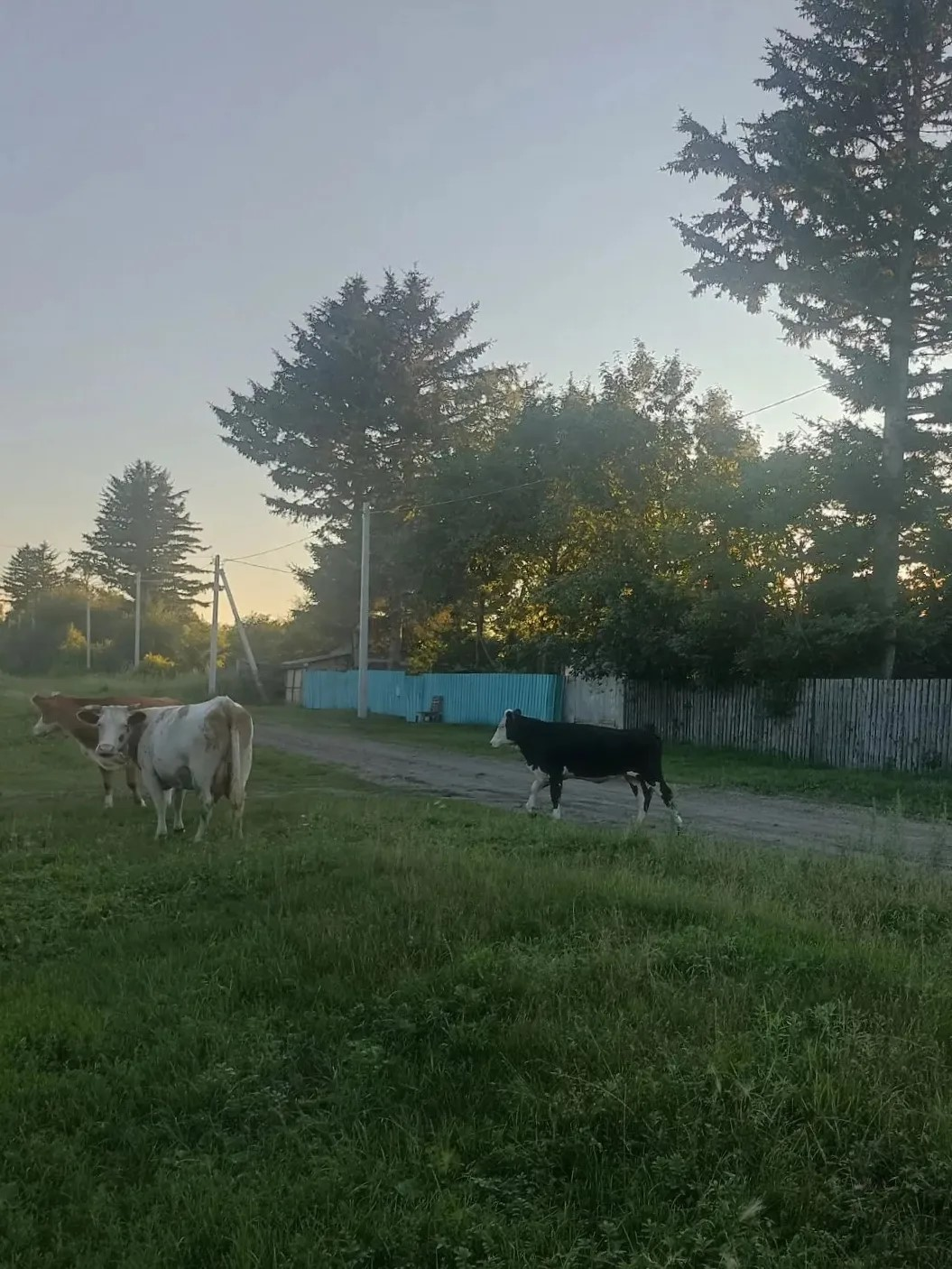
Cows freely roaming on Pozharsky street

Most people in Novoraichikhinsk live in the northeastern part of the settlement in the Soviet-era high-rise buildings on Svetlaya, Shosseynaya and Poyarkovskaya streets. The rest of the settlement is mostly small houses. For most of the settlement's existence streets other than Svetlaya and Shosseynaya were unlit, but street lights were installed all around the settlement in the early-mid 2020s. Most-soviet era parks and recreation areas, such as a club on Lenin square were abandoned and destroyed. Nightlife is sparse and almost nonexistent outside the northeastern part of the settlement. The settlement was notorious for wild dogs, however the local government got rid of most of them in the early 2020s.

== Jobs and employment ==
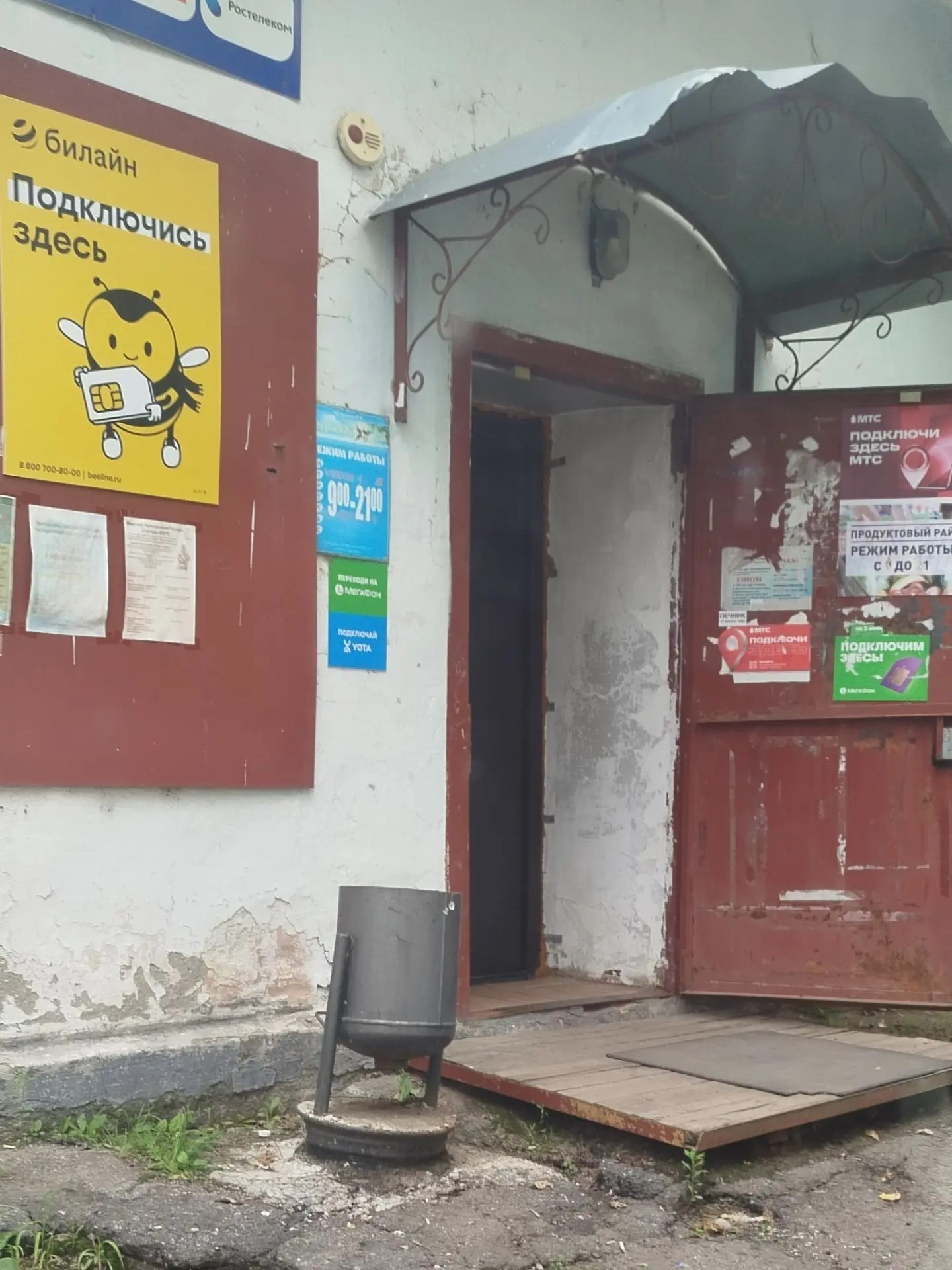
Produktovy rai (lit. "Heaven of Products"), a general store in central Novoraychikhinsk

After the Novoraichikhinsk Mechanical Plant was abandoned, most people left Novoraichikhinsk and moved to Progress. Most people in Novoraichikhinsk either work in stores or in their own farms. Due to a lack of supply and huge demand for products, prices in Novoraichikhinsk's shops are often double of that in Progress. This and other factors encourage people to leave Novoraichikhinsk and move to places like Progress, Raychikhinsk or Blagoveshchensk.

== Education ==
The settlement has one school, School №12 and the kindergarten Raduga in the same building. However, due to a lack of teachers and staff most people take their kids to schools in Progress.

== Transportation ==
Novoraichikhinsk is integrated into the public transport system of Progress. Routes №1 and №125 run through the settlements of Progress, Raichikhinsk and Shiroky, as well as Novoraichikhinsk. There are 3 bus stops in Novoraichikhinsk: Vesna, Shkolnaya and Novoraichikhinsk.
