= Svobodny Railroad Car Repair Plant =

The Svobodny Railroad Car Repair Plant or Svobodnensky car-repair plant (Russian: Свободненский вагоноремонтный завод) is an enterprise for the repair of railroad cars. It is located in Svobodny, Amur region, Russia.

The plant is part of the Transvagonmash company.

== History ==
The plant was founded in 1933 under the name Mikhaylo-Chesnokovsky car-repair plant. Since 1968, it has been called Svobodnensky car-repair plant.

During the Great Patriotic War the company built flamethrowers.

The plant now repairs gondola cars and makes railroad wheels.
