= Ogodzha =

Ogodzha Огоджа
- Selo
- Location within Amur Oblast Location within Russia
- Coordinates: 52°45′N 132°32′E
- Country: Russia
- Region: Amur Oblast
- District: Selemdzhinsky District
- Time zone: UTC+9:00

Ogodzha (Russian: Огоджа) is a rural locality (a selo) in Selemdzhinsky Selsoviet of Selemdzhinsky District, Amur Oblast, Russia. The population was 310 as of 2018. There are 13 streets.

== Geography ==
Ogodzha is located on the right bank of the Ogodzha River, 86 km southwest of Ekimchan (the district's administrative centre) by road. Koboldo is the nearest rural locality.
