= Progress, Amur Oblast =

Progress Прогресс
- Work settlement
- A residential building in Progress

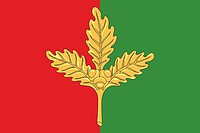
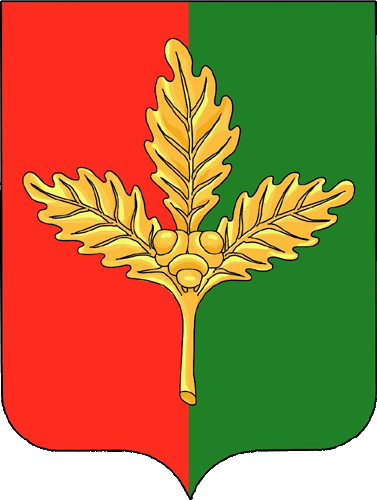
- Flag Coat of arms
- Interactive map of Progress
- Location of Progress Progress (Amur Oblast)
- Coordinates: 49°45′N 129°41′E
- Country: Russia
- Federal subject: Amur Oblast
- Founded: 1948

Government
  - Head of Administration: Sergey Mikhailovich Provotorov
- Elevation: 356 m (1,168 ft)

Population (2010 Census)
  - Total: 11,156
  - Estimate (2023): 9,820 (−12%)

Administrative status
  - Subordinated to: Progress Urban Okrug
  - Capital of: Progress Urban Okrug

Municipal status
  - Urban okrug: Progress Urban Okrug
  - Capital of: Progress Urban Okrug
- Time zone: UTC+9 (MSK+6)
- Postal codes: 676790, 676791
- OKTMO ID: 10775000051
- Website: progress.amurobl.ru

Progress (Russian: Прогре́сс) is an urban locality (a work settlement) in Amur Oblast, Russia, located southeast of Blagoveshchensk, the administrative center of the oblast.

Population: 11,156 (2010 census); 13,080 (2002 census); 14,345 (1989 Soviet census).

== Administrative and municipal status ==
Within the framework of administrative divisions, it is, together with the work settlement of Novoraychikhinsk and one rural locality (the settlement of Kivdinsky), incorporated as Progress Urban Okrug—an administrative unit with the status equal to that of the districts. As a municipal division, this administrative unit also has urban okrug status.

A bus in Progress.
