= Raychikhinsk =

Town in Amur Oblast, Russia

Raychikhinsk Райчихинск
- Town
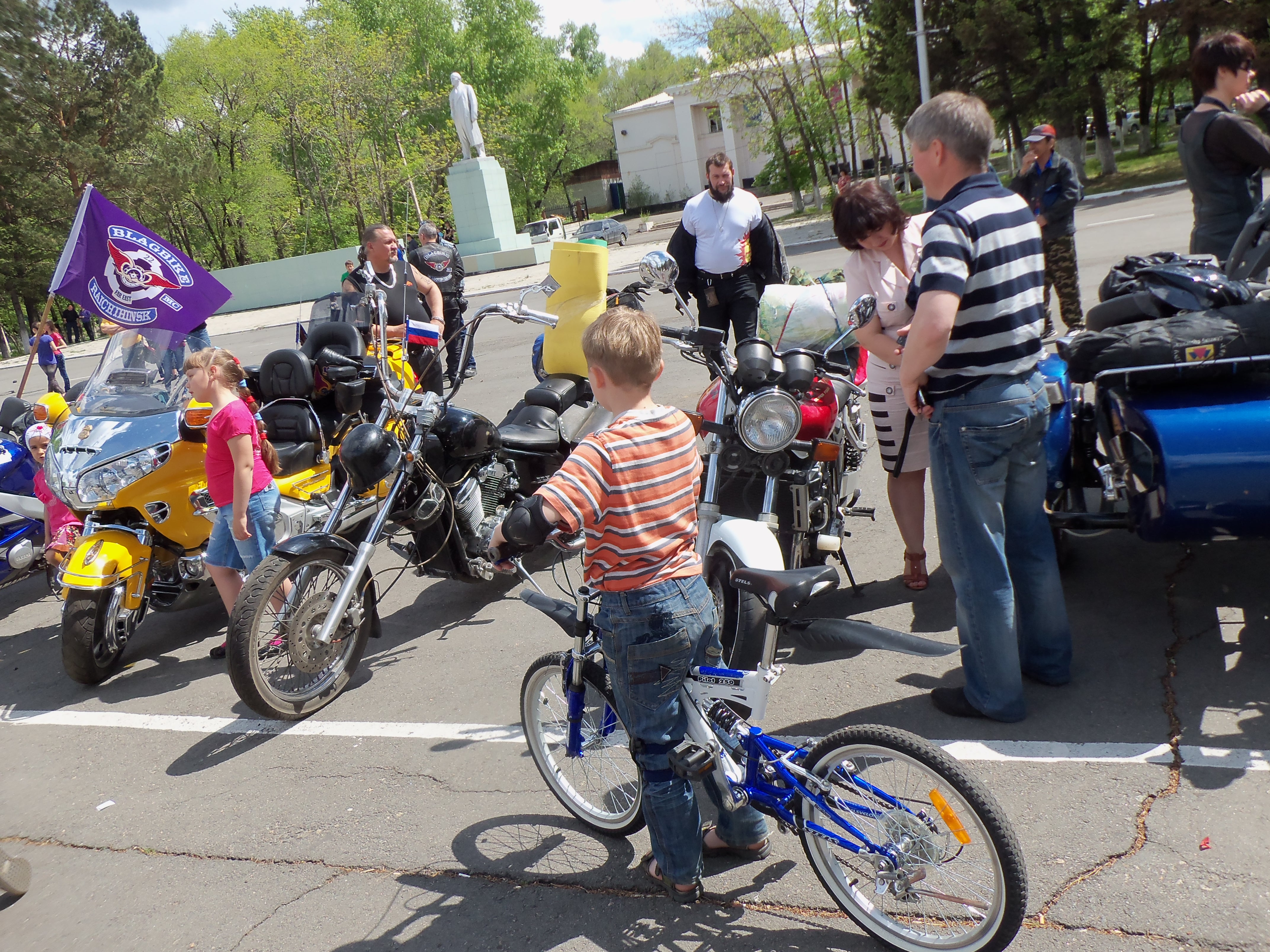
- Motor Rally in Raychikhinsk

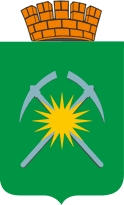
- Flag Coat of arms
- Interactive map of Raychikhinsk
- Location of Raychikhinsk Raychikhinsk (Amur Oblast)
- Coordinates: 49°47′N 129°25′E
- Country: Russia
- Federal subject: Amur Oblast
- Founded: 1932
- Town status since: 1944

Government
  - Head: Viktor Radchenko
- Elevation: 200 m (660 ft)

Population (2010 Census)
  - Total: 20,534
  - Estimate (2023): 15,860 (−22.8%)

Administrative status
  - Subordinated to: Raychikhinsk Urban Okrug
  - Capital of: Raychikhinsk Urban Okrug

Municipal status
  - Urban okrug: Raychikhinsk Urban Okrug
  - Capital of: Raychikhinsk Urban Okrug
- Time zone: UTC+9 (MSK+6)
- Postal codes: 676770–676772, 676776, 676779
- Dialing code: +7 41647
- OKTMO ID: 10720000001
- Website: www.raychihinsk.ru

Raychikhinsk or Raichikhinsk (Russian: Райчи́хинск) is a town in Amur Oblast, Russia, located in the Zeya–Bureya basin, about 40 kilometers (25 mi) from the Amur River and the border with China, and about 165 kilometers (103 mi) east of Blagoveshchensk, the administrative center of the oblast. Population: 20,534 (2010 census); 24,498 (2002 census); 27,873 (1989 Soviet census).

== History ==
The town is located near a brown coal deposit which had been known of since the late 1800s. Mining began in 1913, with the foundation of the first permanent settlement in 1932, named Raychikha (Райчиха) after a local stream.

From 1938 until 1942, Raychikha was host to a prison camp of the gulag system, where up to 11,000 prisoners were kept for forced labor in the mining of coal.

In 1944, it was granted town status and given its present name.

== Administrative and municipal status ==
Within the framework of administrative divisions, it is, together with three rural localities, incorporated as Raychikhinsk Urban Okrug—an administrative unit with the status equal to that of the districts. As a municipal division, this administrative unit also has urban okrug status.

== Economy ==
Brown coal mining remains the main economic focus of the town; two open-pit mines surround the town almost completely. The city's largest enterprise is JSC Amursky Coal (Severo-Vostochny and Yerkovetsky open-pit mines, Kontaktovy plot).

== Transportation ==
The town is terminus for a 39-kilometer (24 mi) branch line, which connects to the Trans-Siberian Railway at Bureya.
