= Chigiri =

Chigiri Чигири
- Selo
- Location within Amur Oblast Location within Russia
- Coordinates: 50°20′N 127°30′E
- Country: Russia
- Region: Amur Oblast
- District: Blagoveshchensky District
- Time zone: UTC+9:00

Chigiri (Russian: Чигири) is a rural locality (a selo) and the administrative center of Chigirinsky Selsoviet of Blagoveshchensky District, Amur Oblast, Russia. The population was 10,244 as of 2018. There are 210 streets.

== Geography ==
Chigiri is located 11 km north of Blagoveshchensk (the district's administrative centre) by road. Berezki is the nearest rural locality.
