= Bureya, Russia =

Bureya Бурея
- work settlement
- A brick house in Bureya
- Interactive map of Bureya
- Location of Bureya Bureya (Amur Oblast)
- Coordinates: 49°48′37″N 129°48′41″E
- Country: Russia
- Federal subject: Amur Oblast
- Administrative district: Bureysky District

Population (2010 Census)
  - Total: 4,833
  - Estimate (2025): 3,216 (−33.5%)

Municipal status
  - Municipal district: Bureysky Municipal District
  - Urban settlement: Work Settlement Bureya Urban Settlement
  - Capital of: Work Settlement Bureya Urban Settlement
- Time zone: UTC+9 (MSK+6)
- Postal code: 676701
- OKTMO ID: 10615157051

Bureya (Russian: Бурея) is an urban locality (a work settlement) in Bureysky District of Amur Oblast, Russia. Population: 4,833 (2010 census); 5,598 (2002 census); 6,736 (1989 Soviet census).
