= Feminist performance art =

According to scholar Virginia Mackenny, performance art is a great tool to mold and remold gender because performance art, in most instances, includes a direct subversion to everyday conventions. MacKenny also writes that feminist performance Art had a large presence "in the late '60s and early '70s in America when, in the climate of protest constituted by the civil rights movement and second wave feminism." There are several movements that fall under the category of feminist performance art, including Feminist Postmodernism, which took place during 1960–1970 and focused on the exploitation of women's bodies as a means for profit. Similarly, the Chicanx movement emerged in East Los Angeles during the 1970s, and focused on the Vietnam war, which was considered a post-apartheid movement.

== Feminist performance art history ==
Performance art in theatre started in Greek and Rome, and later in England. Performers in the Roman Imperial age were referred to as "mimes", as a way regarding to their gender - by "mime actors" and "mime actresses". Within the Roman theatre, male has dominated among the performers, as stated in The History of the Theatre written bu Brockett and Hildy.

== Feminist postmodernism ==
As Forte writes in her analysis of feminist performance art in the 1960s and 1970s, “Within this movement, women's performance emerges as a specific strategy that allies postmodernism and feminism … women used performance as a deconstructive strategy to demonstrate the objectification of women and its results”. Another strategy that was commonly used by feminist performance artists during the postmodernist movement was “removing of the mask,” which was utilized to demonstrate the consequences of female representations in the media, on the psyche of women. MacKenny also writes about the removing of the mask within Feminist Postmodernism. She writes, “This 'masquerade' or 'masking' occurs when women play with their assigned gender roles in multiple, often contradictory ways - adopting, adapting, overlaying and subverting the hegemonic discourse in the process.”

== Chicano movement ==
During the late 1960s and early 1970s in East Los Angeles, American citizens of Mexican descent protested against the Vietnam War and the disproportionate deaths of Chicanos in it. At that time, 22% of deaths on the front lines of the Vietnam war were Chicanos, while the percentage of the population was only 5%. This was due to the poor education system that did not prepare students for college, leaving them with few options but enlistment. The protests include the Blowouts or student walkouts, and the Chicano Moratorium. The art group Asco, based in East LA, commented on the impacts of the war on queer and brown identities, as well as the tragedies that occurred in the protests discussed above due to police brutality. The group created impromptu street performances in the form or processions on Whittier Boulevard. The processions took the same route as the Chicano Moratorium and also referenced traditional Mexican and Catholic processions of the Christmas posada. Some of their most famous performances experiment with gender roles, for example, one male identifying artist attended a club wearing “booty shorts, pink platforms, and a shirt that said ‘just turned 21.’” The group continued to make performance and visual art that engaged with concepts related to queer and ethnic identity in East LA. During this period, East LA was ghettoized through a border of highways and dilapidated conditions.

== Post-apartheid movement ==
MacKenny writes about two of the major players in the Post-apartheid performance art movement in South Africa. She first writes about Carol Anne Gainer and her performance entitled "Exposed". MacKenny explains that Gainer disrupts and subverts the binary as she performs as both the model and artist in this performance, which works to blur the "distinction between artist/art, artist/model, constructor/constructed, finder/found, mind/body, subject/object." The second artist which Mackenny writes about is a mixed race artist who performs a piece called "Span2. MacKenny asserts that the artist Tracey Rose, alludes to Western societies exploitation of people of colour in scientific study and analysis, and the "dissection and embalming of body parts of native 'others' (the most pertinent to the South African context being Saartje Baartman, a young Khoisan woman displayed as the "Venus Hottentot" for her unique genitalia and steatopygia, or enlarged buttocks)," through her own display of her body. Her performance exposes her naked body and is contrasted against images of "scientific" exploitation, which both highlights the dichotomy between these subjects and engages with Mackenny's definition of post-apartheid performance art and its political aim to blur and disrupt binary structures.

=== Anti-war performance art movement ===
The sociologist Rachel V. Kutz-Flamenbaum writes about two major players in the anti-war performance art movement during the George W. Bush administration. Code Pink and Raging Grannies challenge and subvert gender norms in their performances, and thus, use very similar tactics and strategies. For instance, in Code Pink, Kutz-Flamenbaum asserts that, "the emphasis on women's role as pacifist caregivers presents a nonthreatening image of women activists."

The perpetuated concept of women as non threatening, relies on the audiences association of pink as a non threatening and feminized colour. Kutz-Flamenbaum argues that "Code Pink’s use of civil disobedience and aggressive trailing of public officials confound and challenge normative gender expectations of women as passive, polite, and well-behaved."(95) Kutz-Flamenbaum claims that Raging Grannies similarly use this tactic in the description of their mission statement. Kutz-Flamenbaum explains that their mission statement "illustrates the way Raging Grannies use norm- embracing stereotypes of 'little old ladies' and 'grannies' to challenge the gendered assumptions of their audiences." Their conscious performance as non-threatening and nurturing women, strategically and tactfully confront issues related to war and challenge the participation of the George W Bush administration in the war.

== Body in feminist performance art ==
The human body, in feminist performance, who performs or appears on stage, has become evidence to speak for herself. Anna Maria Giannini is an author and artist of "Intimate Visibilities", who researches the female body on video/ performance and installation. She stated in an article that the notion of female body in performance art has contained "the private and intimacy...of the public arena... allowing the viewer to experience a sense of strangeness".

=== Examples of female artists using their body ===
Regina José Galindo is a Guatemalan performance artist who specialises in body art. Galindo's female body works focus on two major representations: First, the representation of the "excessive, carnivalized, grotesque and abject female body"; second, on the "female body that has been subjected to violence at a private and public level". Galindo use body to explore "female sexuality, notions of feminine beauty, race or domestic and national violence". Editors of Holy Terrors: Latin American Women Perform (2003) stated Galindo's body art as "politics of representation and the strategies of power written across the female body, which serves as both message and the vehicle". Galindo's body works explore the relationship between "womanhood and patriarchy", as how Russo, M. (1994) has mentioned female body "as a model of normatively, the severe and penetrating moral, social and aesthetic judgement seem to converge upon the female body".

Karen Finley is a performer who performing nude, by shocking her audiences with violent and sexual abuse stories. In her performance, she used to stand at the point as "victims of rape, child abuse, AIDS, domestic violence and racism". Finely is using her body and the nudity from her body performance to "speaking for other women who are unable to speak for themselves". Finely's body as a medium to present as a "site of oppression". Despite the critique of Finely's nudity performances as "being pornographic", she believes that a woman's body can become a representative for the bodies of all women who have or will suffer from oppression.

== Feminist performance art in Japan ==
=== Yoko Ono's Cut Piece (1964) responds to gender violence ===
Yoko Ono's Cut Piece (1964) is categorised as performance art, a piece where Ono sits in the centre of the stage by herself, wearing a formal suit. Ono's performance invited audience to "cut a small piece" from her suit with a pair of scissors given by Ono. Ono described Cut Piece (1964), at the first time she performed, as "a test of her commitment to life as an artist...", which Ono's Cut Piece (1964) was not first implying the ideology to against violence in gender or presenting the piece with a feminism ideology. Ono performed her work Cut Piece (1964) in Paris, more than 30 years later – For World Peace, in September 2003. Ono has restated her thoughts on Cut Piece (1964) as "against ageism, against racism, against racism, against sexism, and against violence" to the Routers News Agency. In Dolan's article "Make a Spectacle, Make a Difference" (2010), which stated that there are more women initiate into the playwrights and to perform on stage within recent twenty years. During the 1970s, in the US, women started to promote theatre of women, in order to crack down the domination of men in the theatre. There are a rising numbers of women engage into playwright and perform on stage, similarly to Yoko Ono; the stage or the theatre becomes a medium to the women to "express their lives and politics" and to create "collectives". Yoko Ono's Cut Piece (1964), as a performance which against gender violence, either for men or women, rising the political problematic of gender inequality in theatre, which offers a new way for female to make changes on gender domination within performance art.

==== Male gaze in performance triggered gender violence ====
Performance art was being a popular medium to express and to respond to the political unrest and the changing culture, since the late 1960s to '70s. Performance art has free the body, which allows the body being implied "sexual liberation and resistance to cultural constraints". Considering feminist performance, the "object of gaze" and an "object of desire" are the biggest concern in the theatre. Connected with Yoko Ono's Cut Piece (1964), the "real gaze" from the male audience may not be seen through the third perspective, yet we can perceive their actions by seeing male audiences cutting off pieces of fabric from Ono's suit. There has been various discussion by scholars of feminism studies about the "male gaze" on female performances or theatres. Sue-Ellen Case, author of Feminism and Theatre (1988), has suggested that the image of female performers would have been projected as "courtesan" by the desire from male audience. Case here means that the desire of male audience, has motivate themselves to "look" at the female performers as a "sexual object". Besides, Laura Mulvey, who suggested that under the male gaze, woman has become a "passive object". Other than that, Hov, Live, author of "The First Female Performers: Tumblers, Girls, and Mime Actresses", who suggested that "male-gaze" violence is a matter which "considered as universal" of all "theatre and performance", as long as "real women participate in the actions presented for the audience".
