= Aleksandr Kisly =

Russian footballer

Personal information
- Full name: Aleksandr Vladimirovich Kisly
- Date of birth: 7 January 1974 (age 52)
- Height: 1.79 m (5 ft 10 1/2 in)
- Position: Forward

Youth career
- DYuSSh Nakhodka

Senior career*
Years	Team	Apps	(Gls)
1992–1993	FC Okean Nakhodka	1	(0)
1993	→ FC Okean-d Nakhodka (loan)	23	(5)
1996–1998	FC Okean Nakhodka	44	(5)
1999–2000	FC Lokomotiv Ussuriysk (amateur)		
- * Club domestic league appearances and goals

Aleksandr Vladimirovich Kisly (Russian: Александр Владимирович Кислый; born 7 January 1974) is a former Russian football player.
