= Roman Kislyakov =

Ukrainian footballer

Personal information
- Date of birth: 2 May 1988 (age 38)
- Place of birth: Ordzhonikidze, Dnipropetrovsk Oblast, Ukrainian SSR
- Height: 1.83 m (6 ft 0 in)
- Position: Midfielder

Youth career
- 2001–2002: Shakhtar Donetsk
- 2004–2005: Obriy Nikopol

Senior career*
Years	Team	Apps	(Gls)
2006	Avanhard Ordzhonikidze	7	(2)
2007	Zirka Kirovohrad	5	(1)
2007	Kryvbas Kryvyi Rih	0	(0)
2008–2009	Dnepr Mogilev	3	(0)
2010	Kolos Nikopol Raion	22	(3)
2011	Mažeikiai	27	(1)
2012	Kruoja Pakruojis	1	(0)
2012	Stal Dniprodzerzhynsk	19	(0)
- * Club domestic league appearances and goals

Roman Kislyakov (Ukrainian: Роман Кисляков; born 2 May 1988) is a former Ukrainian professional footballer.
