= Kislyak =

Kislyak (Belarusian: Кісляк, Russian: Кисляк) is a surname of Slavic-language origin. It may refer to:

- Syarhey Kislyak (born 1987), a Belarusian professional footballer
- Sergey Kislyak (born 1950), a Russian diplomat who has served as Russia's Ambassador to the United States
