= Amur–Zeya Plain =

Plateau in Russia

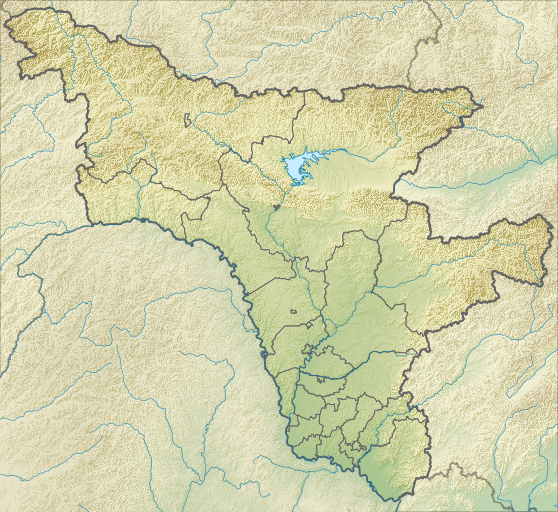
- Location within Amur Oblast

Highest point
- Peak: 904
- Elevation: 300 m (980 ft)

Dimensions
- Length: 480 km (300 mi)
- Width: 240 km (150 mi)

Geography
- Country: Russia
- Federal subject: Amur Oblast
- Range coordinates: 52°40′N 128°30′E
- Parent range: South Siberian System

Amur–Zeya Plain (Russian: Амурско-Зейское плато) is a plateau in Amur Oblast, Russia.

The climate is continental with features of the monsoon, with cold, snowless winters and moderately warm summers. There are places gold deposits. The first exploration of the plateau was made by Russian pioneers in the 17th century.

== Geography ==
It is located on the left bank of the middle reaches of the Amur river, between the Amur and Zeya. To the north it is bound by the Tukuringra Range and the Dzhagdy Range. The Nora and the Orlovka (Mamyn), right tributaries of the Selemdzha, flow across the plateau.

The average height of the plateau is about 300 meters, the highest - 904 m. The plateau is dominated by plains, ridged and hilly terrain; in the Amur valley terrain extremely dismembered.

Crystalline basement rocks are overlain by layers of sand and clay deposits in the Neogene period lakes and ancient channels of the Amur and Zeya. The distribution of permafrost is patchy.

== Flora ==
On the territory of the plateau common features include larch and pine forests and birch. In the south is characterized by shrub thickets of oak and set of marshes and wetlands.
