= Magdagachi =

Magdagachi Магдага́чи
- work settlement
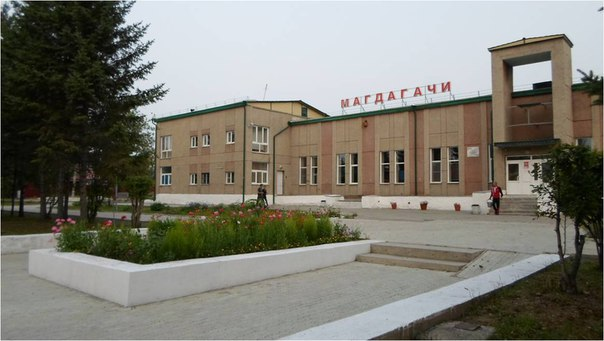
- Train Station in Magdagachi

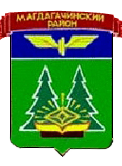
- Coat of arms
- Interactive map of Magdagachi
- Location of Magdagachi Magdagachi (Amur Oblast)
- Coordinates: 53°27′0″N 125°48′0″E
- Country: Russia
- Federal subject: Amur Oblast
- Administrative district: Magdagachinsky District
- Founded: 1910
- Elevation: 356 m (1,168 ft)

Population (2010 Census)
  - Total: 10,897
  - Estimate (2025): 8,739 (−19.8%)

Administrative status
  - Capital of: Magdagachinsky District

Municipal status
  - Municipal district: Magdagachinsky Municipal District
  - Urban settlement: Work Settlement Magdagachi Urban Settlement
  - Capital of: Magdagachinsky Municipal District, Work Settlement Magdagachi Urban Settlement
- Time zone: UTC+9 (MSK+6)
- Postal code: 676124
- OKTMO ID: 10631151051

Magdagachi (Russian: Магдага́чи) is an urban locality (an urban-type settlement) and the administrative center of Magdagachinsky District of Amur Oblast, Russia, located 367 kilometers (228 mi) northwest of Blagoveshchensk. Population: 10,897 (2010 census); 12,208 (2002 census); 15,578 (1989 Soviet census).

== History ==
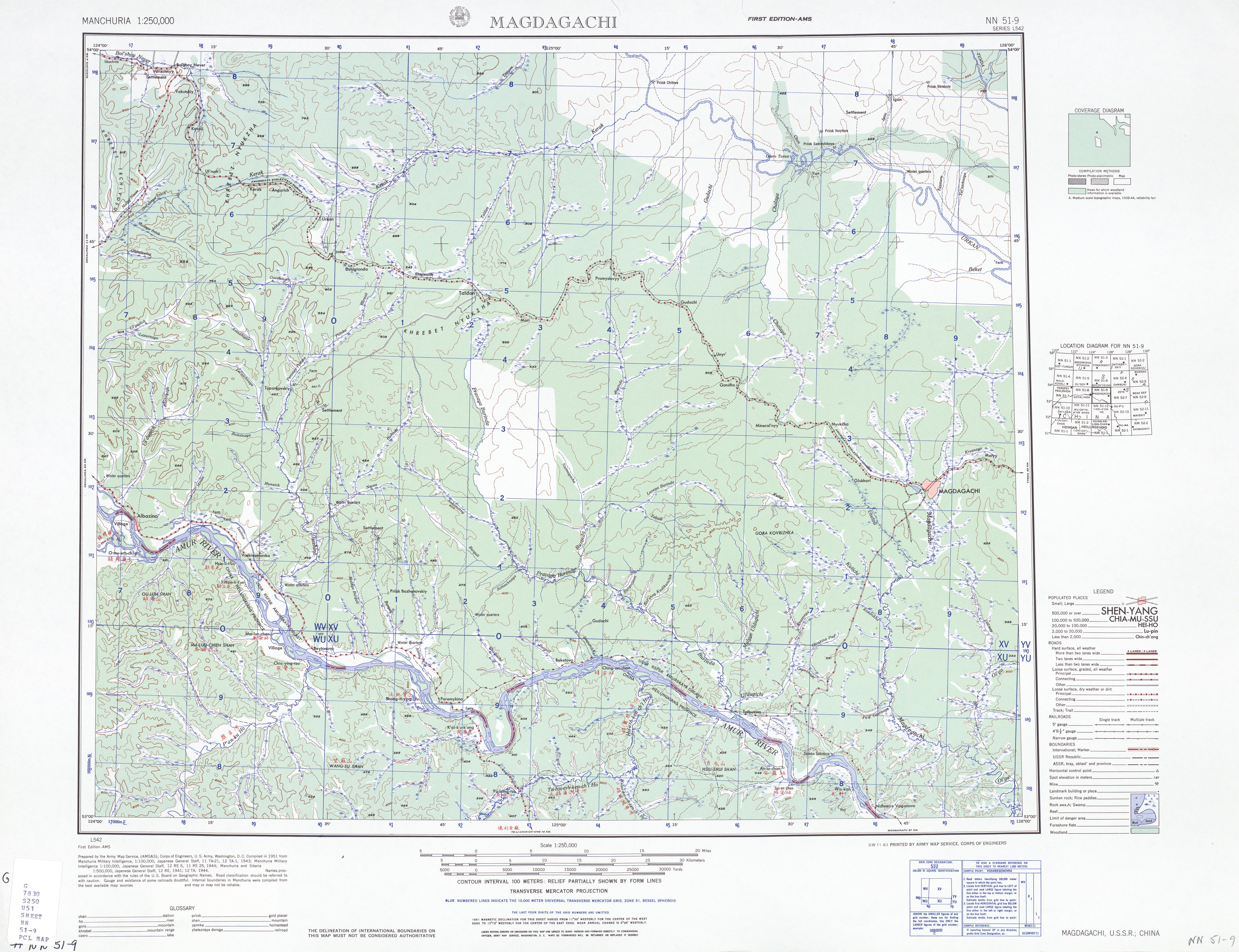
Magdagachi (1951)

It was established in 1910 in connection with the construction of the Amur Railway; both the settlement and the railway station were named after the stream called Magdagachi, which flows into a tributary of the Amur River. Magdagachi was granted urban-type settlement status in 1938.

== Climate ==
Magdagachi experiences a monsoon-influenced humid continental climate (Köppen Dwb) bordering upon a subarctic climate (Dwc) with very cold, dry winters and warm, humid, and rainy summers.

Climate data for Magdagachi
Month	Jan	Feb	Mar	Apr	May	Jun	Jul	Aug	Sep	Oct	Nov	Dec	Year
Record high °C (°F)	−2.0 (28.4)	1.5 (34.7)	15.3 (59.5)	24.6 (76.3)	34.0 (93.2)	37.0 (98.6)	37.5 (99.5)	35.3 (95.5)	28.5 (83.3)	21.1 (70.0)	8.0 (46.4)	1.0 (33.8)	37.5 (99.5)
Mean daily maximum °C (°F)	−18.8 (−1.8)	−13.3 (8.1)	−4.4 (24.1)	6.9 (44.4)	16.5 (61.7)	23.6 (74.5)	25.6 (78.1)	22.8 (73.0)	15.8 (60.4)	4.4 (39.9)	−10.2 (13.6)	−18.8 (−1.8)	4.1 (39.4)
Daily mean °C (°F)	−24.6 (−12.3)	−19.9 (−3.8)	−10.7 (12.7)	1.2 (34.2)	10.1 (50.2)	17.0 (62.6)	19.6 (67.3)	16.7 (62.1)	9.3 (48.7)	−1.6 (29.1)	−15.8 (3.6)	−24 (−11)	−1.9 (28.6)
Mean daily minimum °C (°F)	−30.2 (−22.4)	−26.7 (−16.1)	−18.3 (−0.9)	−5.6 (21.9)	2.6 (36.7)	9.4 (48.9)	12.9 (55.2)	10.0 (50.0)	2.5 (36.5)	−7.9 (17.8)	−21.5 (−6.7)	−29.1 (−20.4)	−8.5 (16.7)
Record low °C (°F)	−45.5 (−49.9)	−42.9 (−45.2)	−36.1 (−33.0)	−22.3 (−8.1)	−8 (18)	−1.6 (29.1)	1.3 (34.3)	0.3 (32.5)	−10 (14)	−24.8 (−12.6)	−38.2 (−36.8)	−46.1 (−51.0)	−46.1 (−51.0)
Average precipitation mm (inches)	10.5 (0.41)	6.1 (0.24)	8.7 (0.34)	20.7 (0.81)	34.4 (1.35)	75.7 (2.98)	88.6 (3.49)	105.6 (4.16)	63.3 (2.49)	23.8 (0.94)	15.9 (0.63)	10.2 (0.40)	463.5 (18.24)
Average precipitation days (≥ 0.1 mm)	7.0	5.5	4.0	6.3	9.9	9.6	10.6	10.4	8.8	8.8	8.9	8.8	98.6
Average relative humidity (%)	73.7	67.0	60.6	56.0	58.6	66.0	73.6	74.0	70.6	70.1	77.1	75.4	68.6
Source: climatebase.ru archive

== Transportation ==
Magdagachi has a station on the Trans-Siberian Railway 7,494 kilometers (4,657 mi) from Moscow). The M58 "Amur" highway traverses it as of 2010. There is also a small regional airport (IATA Code GDG, UHBI), but it is not currently in service.
