= Magdagachinsky District =

Magdagachinsky District Магдагачинский район (Russian)
- District
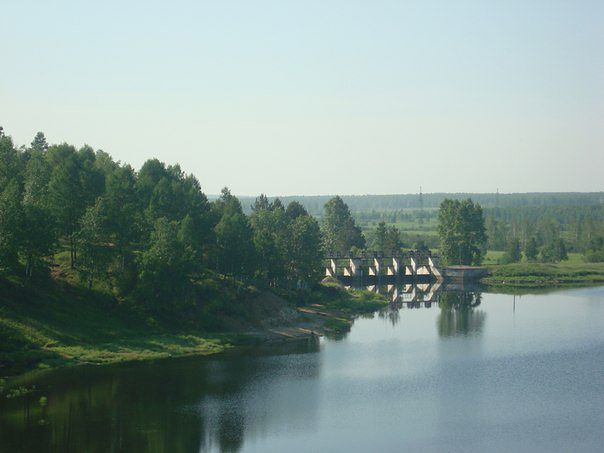
- Magdagachinkoye Reservoir in Autumn

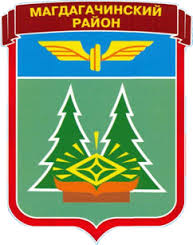
- Coat of arms
- Location of Magdagachinsky District in Amur Oblast
- Coordinates: 53°27′N 125°48′E
- Country: Russia
- Federal subject: Amur Oblast
- Established: 1926
- Administrative center: Magdagachi

Area
  - Total: 16,667 km^{2} (6,435 sq mi)

Population (2010 Census)
  - Total: 22,671
  - Density: 1.3602/km^{2} (3.5230/sq mi)
  - Urban: 67.7%
  - Rural: 32.3%

Administrative structure
  - Administrative divisions: 3 Urban settlements, 8 Rural settlements
  - Inhabited localities: 3 urban-type settlements, 18 rural localities

Municipal structure
  - Municipally incorporated as: Magdagachinsky Municipal District
  - Municipal divisions: 3 urban settlements, 8 rural settlements
- Time zone: UTC+9 (MSK+6)
- OKTMO ID: 10631000
- Website: http://www.magdagachi.ru/

Magdagachinsky District (Russian: Магдага́чинский райо́н) is an administrative and municipal district (raion), one of the twenty in Amur Oblast, Russia. The area of the district is 16,667 square kilometers (6,435 sq mi). Its administrative center is the urban locality (a work settlement) of Magdagachi. Population: 22,671 (2010 census); 26,427 (2002 Census); 33,682 (1989 Soviet census). The population of Magdagachi accounts for 48.1% of the district's total population.

== Geography ==
Magdagachinsky District is located on the Amur-Zeya Plain, in the northwest of Amur Oblast. It is on the eastern (left) bank of the Amur River. The terrain is flat floodplain or slightly hilly ground between the Amur and the Zeya River, which runs in parallel along the district's eastern order about 10 km distant. Both rivers in this area run north to south. The Amur Highway runs through the middle of the district, as does the Trans-Siberian Railway. Both highway and railway run through the administrative center of Magdagachi. The district is 240 km north of the regional city of Blagoveshchensk. The area measures 200 km (north-south), and 110 km (west-east); total area is 16667 km2 (about 5% of Amur Oblast).

The district is bordered on the north and east by Zeysky District, on the southeast by Shimanovsky District, on the west by Skovorodinsky District, and on the southwest by Daxing'anling Prefecture of Heilongjiang Province in China.
