= Tynda =

Town in Amur Oblast, Russia

Tynda Тында
- Town
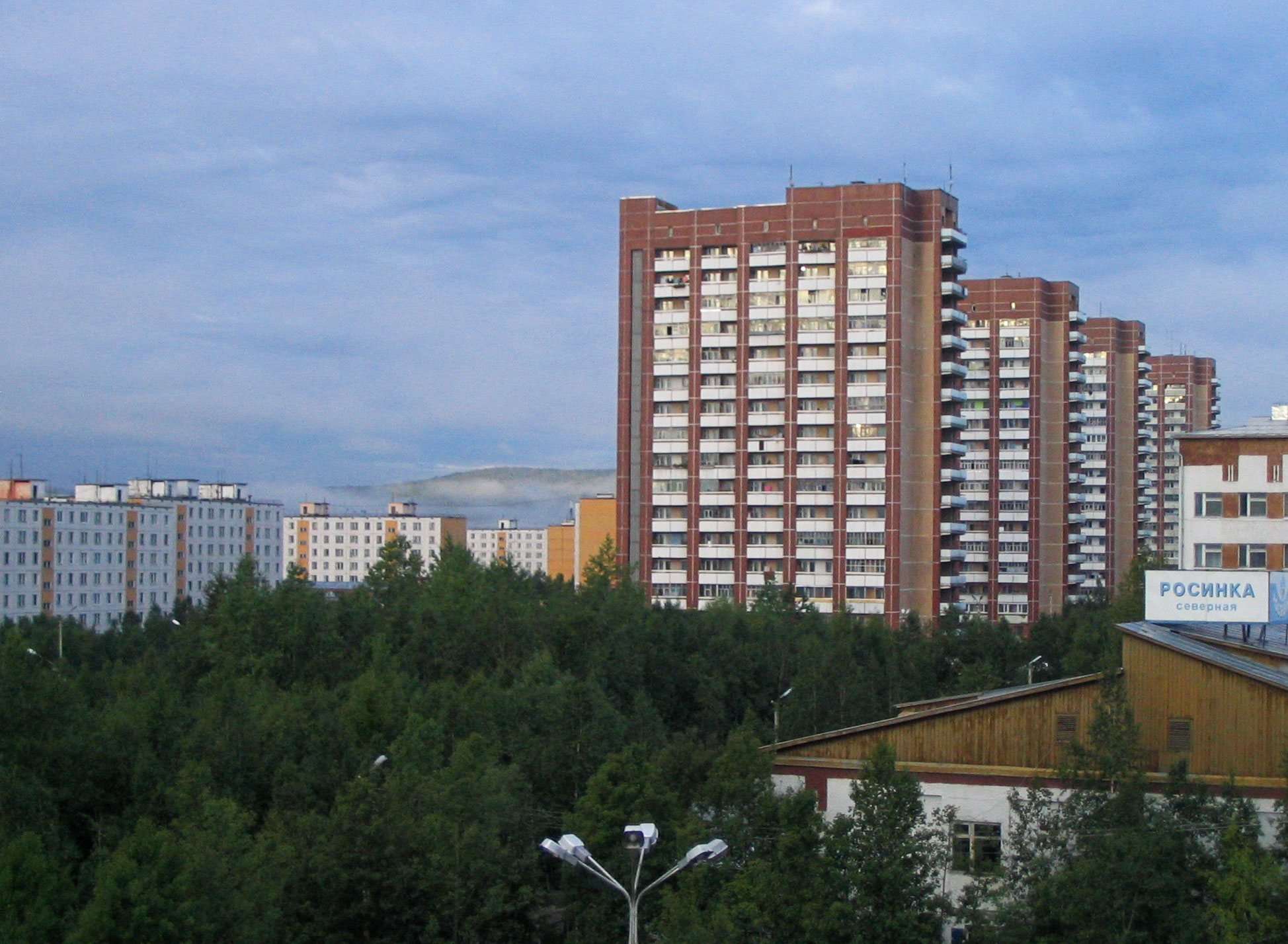
- Residential buildings in Tynda

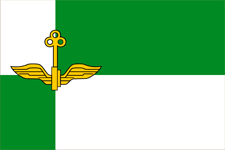
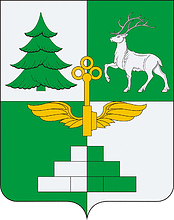
- Flag Coat of arms
- Interactive map of Tynda
- Location of Tynda Tynda (Amur Oblast)
- Coordinates: 55°10′N 124°43′E
- Country: Russia
- Federal subject: Amur Oblast
- Founded: 1917
- Town status since: November 14, 1975

Government
  - Head: Marina Mikhailova

Area
  - Total: 124 km^{2} (48 sq mi)
- Elevation: 520 m (1,710 ft)

Population (2010 Census)
  - Total: 36,275
  - Estimate (2025): 27,626 (−23.8%)
  - Density: 293/km^{2} (758/sq mi)

Administrative status
  - Subordinated to: Tynda Urban Okrug
  - Capital of: Tynda Urban Okrug, Tyndinsky District

Municipal status
  - Urban okrug: Tynda Urban Okrug
  - Capital of: Tynda Urban Okrug, Tyndinsky District
- Time zone: UTC+9 (MSK+6)
- Postal code: 676280–676290
- Dialing code: +7 41656
- OKTMO ID: 10732000001
- Website: web.archive.org/web/20080803192141/http://gorod.tynda.ru/

Tynda (Russian: Ты́нда) is a town in Amur Oblast, Russia, located 568 kilometers (353 mi) northwest of Blagoveshchensk. It is an important railway junction, informally referred to as the capital of the Baikal-Amur Mainline. Its population has declined sharply in recent years: 36,275 (2010 census); 40,094 (2002 census); 61,996 (1989 Soviet census).

== Etymology ==
The name is of Evenk origin and is roughly translated as "on the river bank".

== History ==
The settlement of Shkaruby was founded in 1917 on the present site of Tynda, as a rest stop and winter camp on the route from the Amur to the newly discovered gold fields on the Timpton River, a tributary of the Aldan. In 1928, in conjunction with construction of the highway to Yakutsk, it was renamed Tyndinsky (Ты́ндинский).

In 1932, plans for what would eventually become the Baikal-Amur Mainline (BAM) named Tynda as a possible future hub station. A 180-kilometer (110 mi) long rail line, connecting Tynda with BAM station (known as Bamovskaya) near Skovorodino on the Trans-Siberian Railway was constructed between 1933 and 1937, although this was then dismantled during World War II and the rails reused for other projects closer to the front. In 1941, Tynda was granted urban-type settlement status.

The revival of the construction of the BAM as an All-Union Komsomol Project in the early 1970s saw the reconstruction of the rail line between Bamovskaya and Tyndinsky, followed by the construction of the BAM east and west of the town. The settlement and its hub station were placed under the patronage of Komsomol brigades from Moscow, befitting its status as symbolic capital of the BAM. As its population grew due to the construction, the settlement was granted town status and received its present name on November 14, 1975.

The Amur–Yakutsk Mainline (AYaM) also began construction from Tynda, with the section to Neryungri completed in 1977. Since 2019 the AYaM runs passenger services as far as Nizhny Bestyakh on the bank of the Lena River opposite Yakutsk.

The full extent of the BAM opened for full use in 1989, with the exception of the Severomuysky Tunnel. Tynda went into a decline after the BAM was completed, as the utilization of the mainline turned out to be low. Tynda's population has dropped by over 30% since the dissolution of the Soviet Union, from a high of 61,996 inhabitants recorded in the 1989 Soviet Census, to an estimated population of around 38,000 in 2008.

=== 21st century ===
Following the death of Mayor Schultz in 2012, new elections were announced and held on 19 May 2013. Of the eleven candidates who nominated themselves for the post of mayor of the city, six remained. Voter turnout was low, at 32.4%. The candidate from the United Russia party, Yevgeny Cherenkov, became the head of the city, gaining 50.5% of the vote.

The Blagoveshchensk political observer Yevgeny Ogorodsky, on the eve of the elections, considered that:

Considering the decent federal funds planned for resettlement from dilapidated housing in the BAM zone, the struggle for the seat of mayor of Tynda will be tough. Epstein and Cherenkov are far from the ex-mayor's ratings, so Mikhailova's possible victory will not surprise anyone, although United Russia will try with all its might to prevent this.

After the announcement of the results of the elections for the mayor of the city, political scientist Yevgeny Trofimov commented on the victory of the "party of power":

As expected, candidates from political parties emerged as leaders, while self-nominated candidates had no chance. This is due not so much to the development of party structures but to the technology of elections. Firstly, the elections were held in conditions of low voter turnout, which increased the efficiency of the use of administrative resources and led to the victory of the candidate from the "party of power." Secondly, the winner himself was in unequal conditions with other candidates and had the support of the governor. Numerous meetings between the head of the region and the candidate from United Russia and acting mayor of Tynda led to the association of the candidate with the head of the executive branch of government of the region and with the state resources available to the latter.

In September 2018, Mayor Cherenkov lost the election to the candidate from the Communist Party of the Russian Federation, Marina Mikhailova. Mikhailova was the runner-up to Cherenkov in the 2013 mayoral election, losing by about 14%. Mikhailova's win was dubbed "a real surprise" by the Amurskaya Pravda. Upon her inauguration as mayor, Mikhailova promised several notable changes. She promised a review of the town's budget, including cancelling special pension provisions for elected officials, which were often called "golden parachutes", as well as cutting the salary of the Deputy Chairman of the town Duma. Mikhailova also promised a more austere mayoral inauguration, stating plans to cut the theatrical performances, buffets, and banquets associated with the ceremony, and replacing it with a "working meeting with the townspeople". Other pledges made by Mikhailova included providing more lighting around the town's schools, cleaning up landfills, extending marshrutka services in the evening, and improving winter road services. Mikhailova's victory came amid a bump in Communist Party officials winning local elections in the Amur Oblast, including in Zavitinsk and in Bureysky District. Upon taking office, she made herself largely accessible to her constituents, who would often call her on her cell phone, as well as through her work phone.

In a 2020 interview with the Amurskaya Pravda, Mikhailova claimed she had made progress on several fronts. She said her administration was working to clear the backlog of applicants for municipal housing, reducing the number from 800 people on the waitlist down to about 200. She also said her administration rented out previously-vacant municipal buildings to tenants, and saved millions of rubles on document printing costs.

Under Mikhailova, Tynda was awarded 250 million rubles to renovate Krasnaya Presnya Street, the main street in the town, and construction began in July 2021. Under the terms of the contract, the contractor agreed to complete the repairs by August 2024. At the same time, the contractor had to be paid money for the work done. However, in September, Mikhailova announced that the contractor hired by the town had done an inadequate job, and had nearly forgotten to make storm drains and channels for utility wirings. The contractor, Karer-A, suspended work in July 2022. In September, Mikhailova reported that Karer-A went insolvent.

She voluntarily left the post of mayor of Tynda on 9 December 2022. Mikhailova explained that she departed due to her health. Later that month, a criminal case was opened into Mikhailova, alleging corruption regarding the renovation of Krasnaya Presnya Street. Prosecutors alleged that the contractor, Karer-A, was awarded 600 million rubles to reconstruct the street, but that Mikhailova improperly handled over 130 million rubles. The head of Karer-A was found guilty in December 2023, and was sentenced to seven years in prison, and a fine of 500,000 rubles. Mikhailova's First Deputy was also found guilty, and was handed a suspended sentence of four years and five months. Mikhailova was later also found guilty, and was initially handed a six year sentence in a penal colony, although this was reduced to four and a half years upon an appeal by Mikhailova. As of January 2025, Mikhailova maintains her innocence, and has filed another appeal to serve her remaining sentence through penal labor, considered less harsh than the penal colony.

== Geography ==
The town is located at an elevation of 520 meters (1,710 ft) above sea level, near where the Getkan joins the Tynda River, after which the town was named. The Tynda then flows into the Gilyuy, a tributary of the Zeya, a few kilometers east of the town.

=== Climate ===
Tynda has a subarctic climate (Köppen climate classification Dwc) with severely cold, rather dry winters and warm, very rainy summers. Due to its slightly high elevation, Tynda sees greater diurnal temperature variation than other settlements in the region.

Climate data for Tynda
| Month | Jan | Feb | Mar | Apr | May | Jun | Jul | Aug | Sep | Oct | Nov | Dec | Year |
|---|---|---|---|---|---|---|---|---|---|---|---|---|---|
| Record high °C (°F) | 0.0 (32.0) | −0.5 (31.1) | 12.4 (54.3) | 25.3 (77.5) | 34.0 (93.2) | 35.2 (95.4) | 37.2 (99.0) | 34.4 (93.9) | 28.2 (82.8) | 20.2 (68.4) | 6.2 (43.2) | 0.0 (32.0) | 37.2 (99.0) |
| Mean daily maximum °C (°F) | −23.0 (−9.4) | −16.0 (3.2) | −6.1 (21.0) | 4.1 (39.4) | 13.9 (57.0) | 22.1 (71.8) | 24.3 (75.7) | 21.5 (70.7) | 13.7 (56.7) | 1.4 (34.5) | −13.7 (7.3) | −23.4 (−10.1) | 1.6 (34.9) |
| Daily mean °C (°F) | −29.0 (−20.2) | −24.0 (−11.2) | −14.8 (5.4) | −3.0 (26.6) | 6.6 (43.9) | 14.4 (57.9) | 17.2 (63.0) | 14.3 (57.7) | 6.7 (44.1) | −5.6 (21.9) | −20.2 (−4.4) | −28.7 (−19.7) | −5.5 (22.1) |
| Mean daily minimum °C (°F) | −35.1 (−31.2) | −32.0 (−25.6) | −23.5 (−10.3) | −10.1 (13.8) | −0.7 (30.7) | 6.6 (43.9) | 10.0 (50.0) | 7.1 (44.8) | −0.4 (31.3) | −12.5 (9.5) | −26.8 (−16.2) | −34.0 (−29.2) | −12.6 (9.3) |
| Record low °C (°F) | −50.0 (−58.0) | −49.0 (−56.2) | −42.2 (−44.0) | −35.0 (−31.0) | −12.8 (9.0) | −3.9 (25.0) | −1.1 (30.0) | −6.0 (21.2) | −15.0 (5.0) | −32.5 (−26.5) | −45.0 (−49.0) | −48.9 (−56.0) | −50.0 (−58.0) |
| Average precipitation mm (inches) | 11.4 (0.45) | 11.9 (0.47) | 19.7 (0.78) | 38.3 (1.51) | 74.7 (2.94) | 125.2 (4.93) | 123.3 (4.85) | 143.4 (5.65) | 76.4 (3.01) | 42.8 (1.69) | 23.4 (0.92) | 19.5 (0.77) | 710 (27.97) |
| Average relative humidity (%) | 75.2 | 68.1 | 62.4 | 58.3 | 59.1 | 66.4 | 74.9 | 77.9 | 72.5 | 71.2 | 76.6 | 76.2 | 69.9 |
Source: climatebase.ru (1948–2011)

== Administrative and municipal status ==
Within the framework of administrative divisions, Tynda serves as the administrative center of Tyndinsky District, even though it is not a part of it. As an administrative division, it is incorporated separately as Tynda Urban Okrug – an administrative unit with the status equal to that of the districts. As a municipal division, this administrative unit also has urban okrug status.

=== City leaders ===
Mayors of Tynda
| Start date | End date | Name | Notes |
|---|---|---|---|
| 1992 | 2004 | Mark Borisovich Schultz | |
| 2004 | 7 May 2008 | Viktor Anatolyevich Zubovatkin | |
| 7 May 2008 | 14 December 2012 | Mark Borisovich Schultz | |
| 15 December 2012 | 24 May 2013 | Yevgeny Petrovich Cherenkov | as acting mayor |
| 25 May 2013 | 19 September 2018 | Yevgeny Petrovich Cherenkov | |
| 20 September 2018 | 9 December 2022 | Marina Valentinovna Mikhailova | |
| 10 December 2022 | current | Igor Salnikov | as acting mayor |

== Demographics ==
Russians, Ukrainians, and Belarusians make up the majority of the town's population. In December 2011, Shane Smith of Vice News reported that North Korean loggers also worked in the region, strictly prohibited from speaking with journalists and residing in isolated camps which are closed to all other people.

== Economy and transportation ==
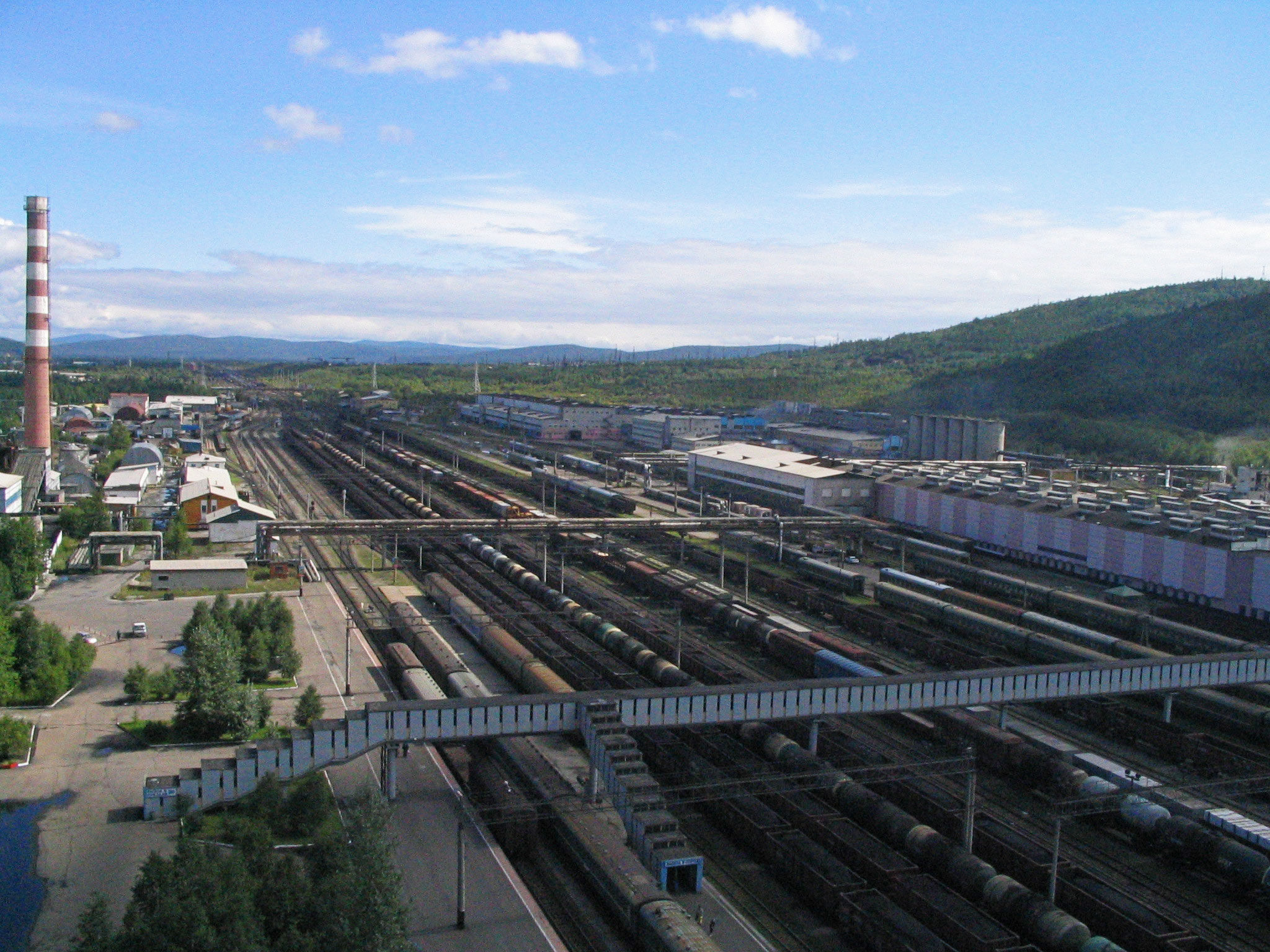
Tynda train station

Tynda is the crossing point for the Baikal-Amur Mainline and Amur–Yakutsk Mainline railways. The town's station is one of the most important on both lines and possesses a large locomotive depot.

Other than railway-related activities, the town's economy relies largely on the timber industry, with the Tyndales corporation based here. The M56 motorway to Yakutsk also passes through the town.

The town is served by the Tynda Airport, located 15 kilometers (9.3 mi) to the north. After being closed for a number of years, air services from Blagoveshchensk via Zeya resumed in 2007.

== Notable people ==
- Narine Arakelian, Armenian interdisciplinary feminist artist

== International relations ==
=== Twin towns and sister cities ===
Tynda is twinned with:

- Wenatchee, Washington, United States
