= Tyndinsky District =

Tyndinsky District Тындинский район (Russian)
- District
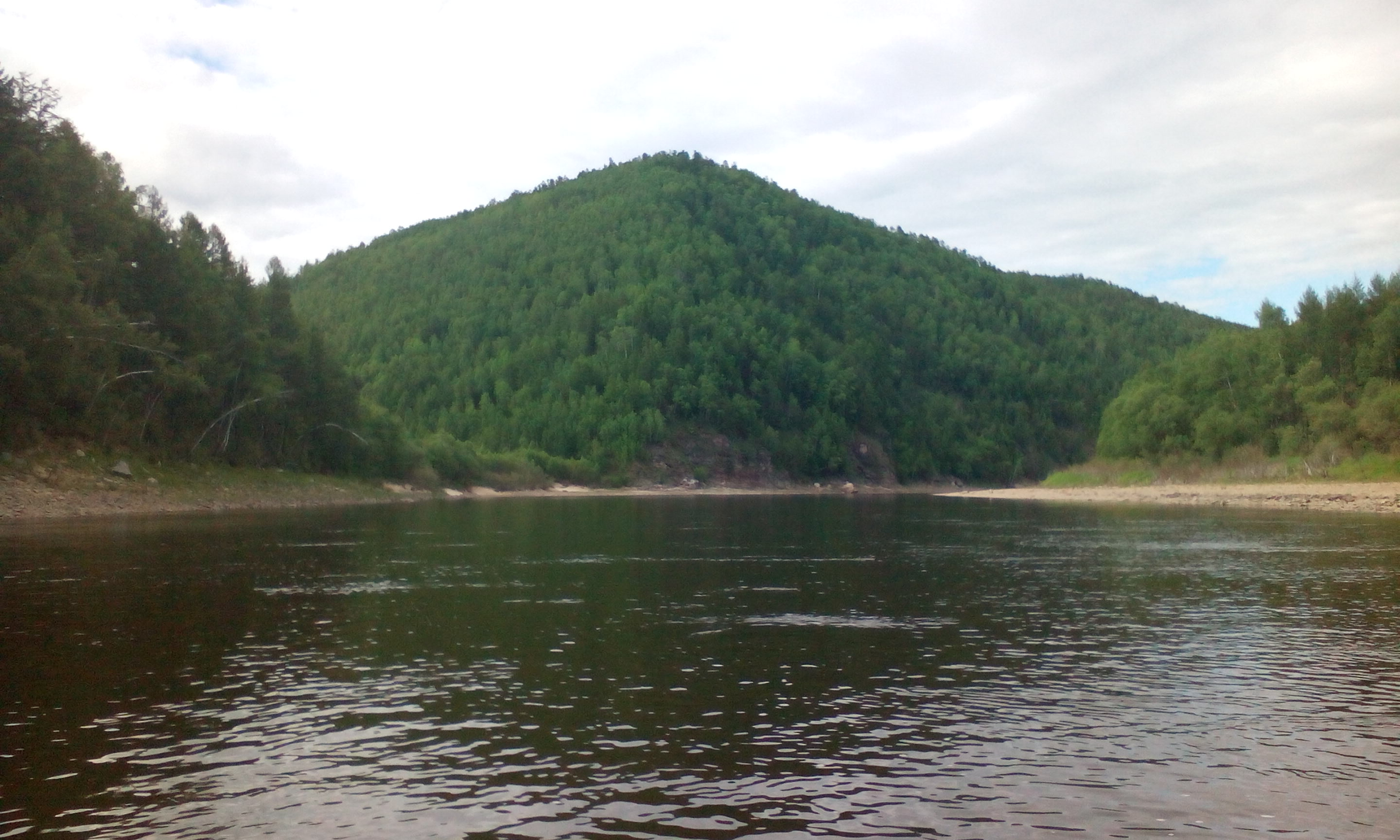
- Lake in Tyndinsky District, Amur Oblast

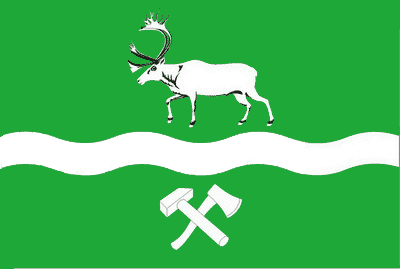
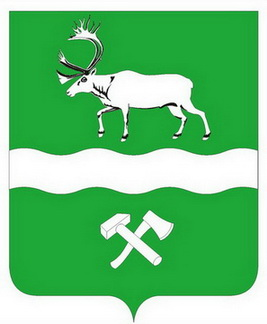
- Flag Coat of arms
- Location of Tyndinsky District in Amur Oblast
- Coordinates: 55°20′N 123°30′E
- Country: Russia
- Federal subject: Amur Oblast
- Established: 10 December 1930
- Administrative center: Tynda

Area
  - Total: 83,258 km^{2} (32,146 sq mi)

Population (2010 Census)
  - Total: 16,065
  - Density: 0.19295/km^{2} (0.49975/sq mi)
  - Urban: 0%
  - Rural: 100%

Administrative structure
  - Administrative divisions: 20 Rural settlements
  - Inhabited localities: 24 rural localities

Municipal structure
  - Municipally incorporated as: Tyndinsky Municipal District
  - Municipal divisions: 0 urban settlements, 20 rural settlements
- Time zone: UTC+9 (MSK+6)
- OKTMO ID: 10654000
- Website: http://atr.tynda.ru/

Tyndinsky District (Russian: Ты́ндинский райо́н) is an administrative and municipal district (raion), one of the twenty in Amur Oblast, Russia. The area of the district is 83,258 square kilometers (32,146 sq mi). Its administrative center is the town of Tynda (which is not administratively a part of the district). Population: 16,065 (2010 census); 16,701 (2002 Census); 35,067 (1989 Soviet census).

== Administrative and municipal status ==
Within the framework of administrative divisions, Tyndinsky District is one of the twenty in the oblast. The town of Tynda serves as its administrative center, despite being incorporated separately as an urban okrug—an administrative unit with the status equal to that of the districts.

As a municipal division, the district is incorporated as Tyndinsky Municipal District. Tynda Urban Okrug is incorporated separately from the district.
