= Amur Oblast =

First-level administrative division of Russia

Amur Oblast Амурская область (Russian)
- Oblast
- Flag Coat of arms

- Coordinates: 53°33′N 127°50′E
- Country: Russia
- Federal district: Far Eastern
- Economic region: Far Eastern
- Established: October 20, 1932
- Administrative center: Blagoveshchensk

Government
  - Body: Legislative Assembly
  - Governor: Vasily Orlov

Area
  - Total: 361,908 km^{2} (139,733 sq mi)
  - Rank: 14th

Population (2021 census)
  - Total: 766,912
  - Estimate (2018): 798,424
  - Rank: 60th
  - Density: 2.11908/km^{2} (5.48839/sq mi)
  - Urban: 68.1%
  - Rural: 31.9%

GDP (nominal, 2024)
  - Total: ₽794 billion (US$9.32 billion)
  - Per capita: ₽1.05 million (US$12,368.5)
- Time zone: UTC+9 (MSK+6)
- ISO 3166 code: RU-AMU
- License plates: 28
- OKTMO ID: 10000000
- Official languages: Russian
- Website: http://www.amurobl.ru/

Amur Oblast (/əˈmʊər ˈɒblæst/) (Note: Russian: Амурская область, romanized: Amúrskaya óblastʹ, IPA: [ɐˈmurskəjə ˈobɫəsʲtʲ]) is a federal subject of Russia (an oblast), located on the banks of the Amur and Zeya rivers in the Russian Far East. The oblast borders Heilongjiang province of the People's Republic of China (PRC) to the south.

The administrative center of the oblast, the city of Blagoveshchensk, is one of the oldest settlements in the far east of the country, founded in 1856. It is a traditional center of trade and gold mining. The territory is accessed by two railways: the Trans-Siberian Railway and the Baikal–Amur Mainline. As of the 2021 Census, the oblast's population was 766,912.

== Names ==
Amur Krai (Аму́рский край) or Priamurye (Приаму́рье 'Circum-Amur') were unofficial names for the Russian territories by the Amur River used in the late Russian Empire that approximately correspond to modern Amur Oblast.

== Geography ==
Amur Oblast is located in the southeast of Russia, between the Stanovoy Range in the north and the Amur River in the south, and borders with the Sakha Republic in the north, Khabarovsk Krai and the Jewish Autonomous Oblast in the east, Heilongjiang of China in the south, and with Zabaykalsky Krai in the west. The Stanovoy Range forms the dividing line between the Sakha Republic and Amur Oblast and spreads across the oblast's entire northern border. The Amur–Zeya and Zeya–Bureya Plains cover about 40% of the oblast's territory, but the rest is hilly. Several mountain ranges rise to the south of the Stanovoy Range, including the Selemdzha Range parallel to it, as well as the Ezop, Yam-Alin and the Turan ranges stretching along the oblast's southeastern border with Khabarovsk Krai.

Many rivers flow through the oblast, especially in the north, accounting for 75% of the hydropower resources in the Russian Far East. Most of the oblast is in the Amur's drainage basin, although the rivers in the northwest drain into the Lena and the rivers in the northeast drain into the Uda. The longest rivers include the Amur, Bureya, Gilyuy, Nyukzha, Olyokma, Selemdzha, and Zeya. The Zeya begins in the mountains in the northeast, and its middle reaches are dammed to create the huge Zeya Reservoir, which sprawls over 2,400 square kilometers (930 sq mi).

Climate is temperate continental, with cold, dry winters and hot, rainy summers. Average January temperatures vary from −24 °C (−11 °F) in the south to −33 °C (−27 °F) in the north. Average July temperatures are +21 °C (70 °F) in the south and +18 °C (64 °F) in the north. Annual precipitation is about 850 mm (33 in).

Dwarf Siberian pine and alpine tundra grow at higher elevations and larch forests with small stands of flat-leaved birch and pine forests grow alongside the river plains. These larch and fir-spruce forests form the watershed of the Selemdzha River. The Bureya and Arkhara Rivers, southeast of the Selemdza, have the richest remaining forests in the oblast with Korean pine, Schisandra chinensis, Mongolian Oak, and other Manchurian flora. The Zeya–Bureya Plain, located between the Zeya, Amur, and Bureya Rivers, has the highest biodiversity in Amur Oblast. Much of this plain has been burned for agriculture, but large patches still remain. Japanese Daurian and Far Eastern western cranes nest here, as well as a host of other rare birds.

=== Natural resources ===
Amur Oblast has considerable reserves of many types of mineral resources; proven reserves are estimated to be worth US$400 billion. Among the most important are gold (the largest reserves in Russia), silver, titanium, molybdenum, tungsten, copper, and tin. There are also an estimated 70 billion tons of bituminous coal and lignite reserves. Probable iron deposits are estimated to be 3.8 billion tons. The Garin deposit is fully explored and known to contain 389 million tons of iron ore. Estimated reserves of the deposit are 1,293 million tons. The deposit's ore contains a low concentration of detrimental impurities; the ore contains 69.9% iron. Amur Oblast is also a promising source of titanium, with the Bolshoy Seyim deposit being the most important.

== History ==
=== Early history ===
According to the Bei Shi (Dynastic History of Northern Dynasties) and the Sui Shu (Chronicles of the Sui dynasty), both Chinese records, this area belonged originally to the territory one of the five semi-nomadic Shiwei, the Bo Shiwei tribes (Chinese: 钵室韋). Their settlements were located on the north of the Yilehuli Mountains in the upper reaches of the Nen River, south of the Stanovoy Range, west of the Bureya and the Malyi Khingan ranges and reaching the Okhotsk Sea on the northeast. They brought tributary presents to the Tang court and disappeared at the dawn of the tenth century with the foundation of the Liao empire.

Later, in the 13th century, the middle-Amur and the Zeya River basin area became the homeland of the Daurs and (further south) the Duchers. The ancestors of the Daurs are thought to be closely related to the Khitans and the Mongols, while the Duchers may have been a branch of the Jurchen people, later known as the Manchus.

The area was conquered by the Manchus in 1639–1640, after defeating the Evenk Federation led by Bombogor. It was returned to the Qing dynasty in the Treaty of Nerchinsk with the Tsardom of Russia.

=== Russian Empire ===
The region was annexed by Russia in 1858 in the Treaty of Aigun between Russia and the Qing dynasty. Amur Oblast was established with its center in Blagoveshchensk.

The region received its first influx of Russian settlers in the mid-seventeenth century. They were looking for a more temperate climate as an escape from the north. After the Opium War, when the Chinese Empire was exposed to the outside world, Russian explorers once again moved to the region (mostly Cossacks and peasant farmers). The last influx of people arrived upon the completion of the Trans-Siberian Railroad.

=== Modern history ===
In April 1920, the Far Eastern Republic, with its capital in Chita, was formed from Amur, Transbaikal, Kamchatka, Sakhalin, and Primorye regions as a democratic "buffer" state in order to avoid war with Japan. It existed until November 1922, when it joined the Russian SFSR.

In January 1926, the territory of Amur Oblast was split between the East Siberian Krai and the Far Eastern Krai. The East Siberian Oblast was divided into Irkutsk Oblast and Chita Oblast in 1937 and the part of Amur within it became part of Chita Oblast. The Far Eastern Krai was divided into Khabarovsk Krai and Primorye Krai in 1938. The territory of Amur Oblast that was in Far Eastern Krai was included in Khabarovsk Krai.

In 1948, Amur Oblast was finally separated from Khabarovsk Krai and Chita Oblast to become an independent region of the RSFSR. Rapid economic growth based on gold production began at that time, and living standards improved with the arrival of young specialists. As the Far Eastern District expanded, the demand for services such as electric power and housing also increased, which stimulated a new round of construction projects. New cities were built, along with the Zeya Hydroelectric Power Plant (Zeiskaya GES), which still supplies electricity to most of the Far Eastern District. On 21 May 1998 Amur alongside Ivanovo, Kostroma, Voronezh Oblast, and the Mari El Republic signed a power-sharing agreement with the federal government, granting it autonomy. This agreement would be abolished on 18 March 2002.

== Administrative divisions ==
The largest urban localities of the oblast are Blagoveshchensk, Belogorsk, Svobodny, Tynda, and Raychikhinsk.

== Politics ==
The Governor of Amur Oblast since 2018 is Vasily Orlov.

On 19 September 2021, elections to the Legislative Assembly of Amur Oblast were held. One self-nominee and seven parties entered the regional parliament: United Russia – 18 seats; the Communist Party of the Russian Federation – 3 seats; the Liberal Democratic Party of Russia, A Just Russia – For Truth, the Party of Pensioners, New People, and Communists of Russia – one each place.

The Chairman of the Legislative Assembly is Konstantin Dyakonov.

=== Governors ===
- 1991 – Albert Krivchenko
- 1993 – Alexander Surat
- 1993 – Vladimir Polevanov
- 1994 – Vladimir Diachenko
- 1996 – Yuriy Lyashko
- 1997 – Anatoly Belonogov
- 2001 – Leonid Korotkov
- 2007 – Nikolay Kolesov
- 2008 – Oleg Kozhemyako
- 2015 – Alexander Kozlov
- 2018 – Vasily Orlov

== Demographics ==
Historical population
Year	Pop.	±%
1897	118,570	—
1926	412,200	+247.6%
1939	634,000	+53.8%
1959	717,514	+13.2%
1970	793,449	+10.6%
1979	937,389	+18.1%
1989	1,057,781	+12.8%
2002	902,844	−14.6%
2010	830,103	−8.1%
2021	766,912	−7.6%
Source: Census data

Population: 766,912 (2021 census); 830,103 (2010 census); 902,844 (2002 census); 1,057,781 (1989 Soviet census).

=== Ethnic groups ===
Ethnicities in Amur Oblast in 2021
Ethnicity	Population	Percentage
Russians	689,864	95.2%
Ukrainians	4,422	0.6%
Armenians	2,988	0.4%
Uzbeks	2,328	0.3%
Azerbaijanis	1,709	0.2%
Tatars	1,546	0.2%
Other Ethnicities	21,986	3.0%
Ethnicity not stated	42,069	–

=== Settlements ===
Largest cities or towns in Amur Oblast 2021 Russian Census
Rank		Administrative Division	Pop.
1	Blagoveshchensk	Blagoveshchensky District	241,437
2	Belogorsk	Belogorsky District	61,440
3	Svobodny	Svobodnensky District	48,517
4	Tynda	Tyndinsky District	28,625
5	Zeya	Zeysky District	19,414
6	Chigiri	Blagoveshchensky District	18,538
7	Shimanovsk	Shimanovsky District	16,488
8	Raychikhinsk	Town of oblast significance of Raychikhinsk	15,797
9	Progress	Town of oblast significance of Progress	9,918
10	Zavitinsk	Zavitinsky District	9,615

Vital statistics for 2024:

- Births: 6,530 (8.7 per 1,000)
- Deaths: 10,624 (14.2 per 1,000)

Total fertility rate (2024):
1.42 children per woman

Life expectancy (2021):
Total — 66.30 years (male — 61.75, female — 71.11)

=== Religion ===
Religion in Amur Oblast as of 2012 (Sreda Arena Atlas)
Russian Orthodoxy	25.1%
Other Orthodox	0.7%
Other Christians	4.8%
Islam	0.6%
Spiritual but not religious	41%
Atheism and irreligion	23.6%
Other and undeclared	4.2%

According to a 2012 survey 25.1% of the population of Amur Oblast adheres to the Russian Orthodox Church, 5% are unaffiliated generic Christians, 1% is an Orthodox believer without belonging to any church or adheres to other (non-Russian) Orthodox churches, and 1% is an adherent of Islam. In addition, 41% of the population declares to be "spiritual but not religious", 24% is atheist, and 2.9% follows other religions or did not give an answer to the question.

== Economy ==
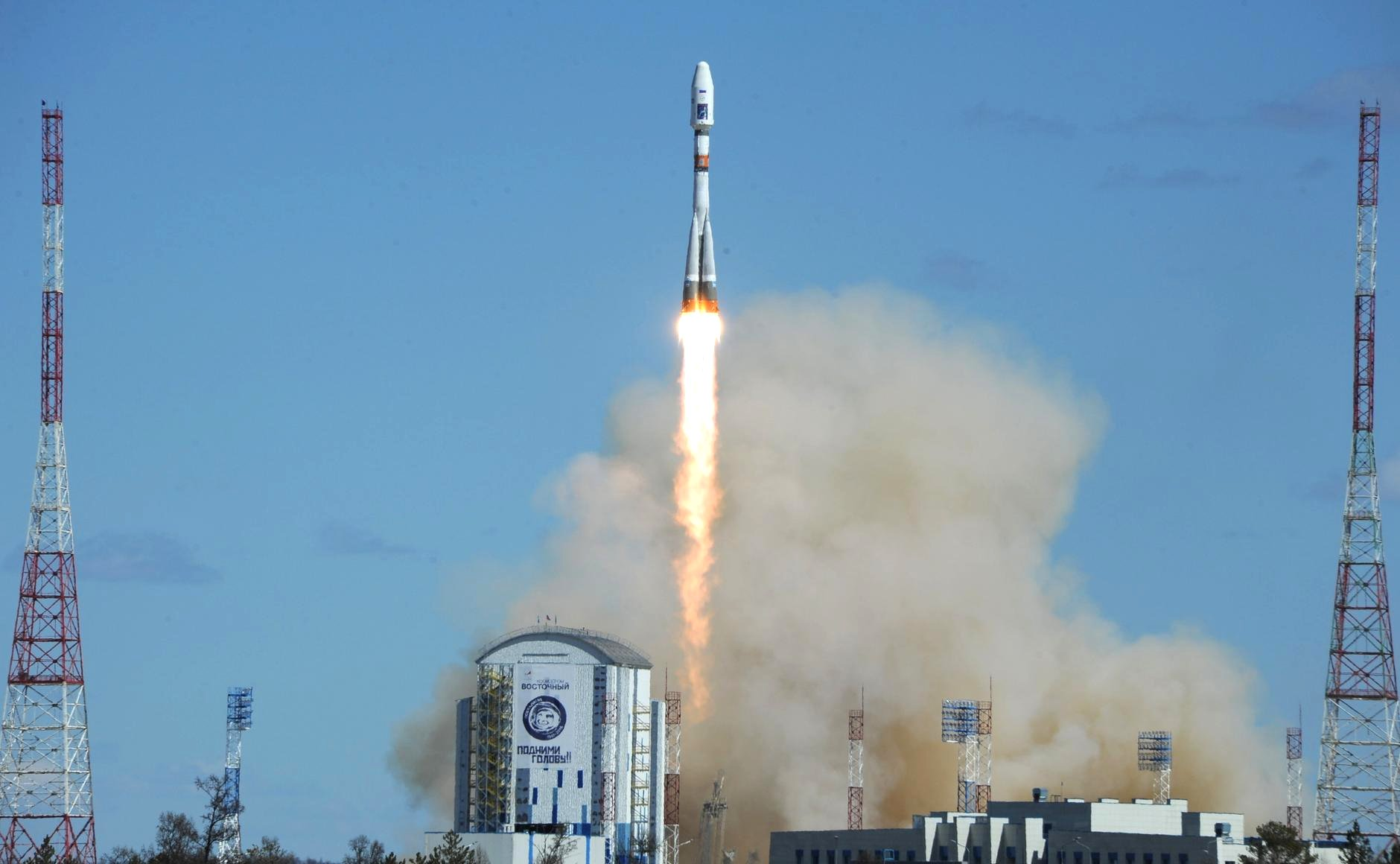
Vostochny Cosmodrome in Amur Oblast

Gross regional product per capita in 2007 was 131,039.60 rubles, while the national average was 198,817 rubles.

=== Industry ===
The industrial section contributes 18.3% to the total GRP. The most important industrial sector in 2007 was manufacturing, constituting 25.7% of the industrial output. The sector is dominated by food products and beverages, which constitute 13% of industrial output. Machine building includes shipbuilding machinery, lifting and transport vehicles, mining equipment, agricultural machinery, metal assemblies and goods, electrical appliances and electrical machines and tools. The largest engineering companies in the oblast include OAO Svobodny Railroad Car Repair Plant, OAO Blagoveshchensk October Revolution Ship Building Plant and OAO Bureya-Kran.

Mining and quarrying amounted to 19.9% of industrial output in 2007. Amur Oblast ranks sixth in Russia for gold mining, and has the largest gold reserves in the country. The largest gold mine in the region is Pioneer, part of Petropavlovsk PLC who also own the Albyn, Malomir and Pokrovskiy mines in the region. There is a large site of uranium mining and processing facilities in Oktyabrsky, near the Russia–China border. There are plans to develop other mineral deposits as well, such as titanium, iron, copper, nickel, apatite, etc. Total coal production amounts to 3,398 tons. As of 2007, four coal deposits are being operated by the company OOO Amur Coal, and two more have been explored. In total, the oblast is estimated to have over 90 deposits of lignite and black coal, with overall reserves of 70 billion tons. In addition, fuel extraction amounted to 2.9% of industrial output.

=== Energy ===
Bureya Dam

Amur Oblast enjoys an energy surplus: its energy consumption in 2007 was 6.9 TWh, while production was 9.3 TWh. Electricity output in 2007 was 9.9 TWh. The most important electricity producer is the Zeyskaya Hydroelectric Power Station with an installed capacity of 1,330 MW and a yearly output of 4.91 TWh. The station is owned by RusHydro. The company also owns the 2,010 MW Bureyskaya Hydroelectric Power Station, opened in 2009. Its annual output is 7.1 TWh.

=== Agriculture ===
The Amur Region is the primary producer of soybean in Russia. By 1940, 65 thousand hectares of land in Amur had been cultivated with soybeans, and by 1972 soybean made up 592 thousand hectares of land in Amur, compared to 650 thousand hectares of soybean crops in the whole of the USSR. During the Soviet period, this made up a significant proportion of the economy of Far Eastern Russia. By 2019, the Amur Region's share of Russian soybean production had declined to 28 percent due to increased cultivation of soybean in other regions, though it still remains Russia's largest soybean producer. The region in 2019 produced approximately 1 million tonnes of soybean, many of which are exported to neighboring China. While in the past the harvested soybean was shipped west, in recent years due to increased Chinese demands multiple soybean oil plants have opened in the region. In 2019, Chinese companies owned or leased some 100 thousand hectares out of the 1.3 million hectares of farmland.

=== Foreign trade ===
The oblast's main foreign exports are raw timber (1,172,900 cubic meters going to China, North Korea, Japan, Kazakhstan and Ukraine), metal goods (68,300 tons to China and Kazakhstan), and machinery, equipment and transport (12,300 tons to China, Japan, South Korea, Kazakhstan and Ukraine.) Main foreign imports are food and beverages from China, Kazakhstan, Uzbekistan and Philippines; textiles and footwear from China; and machinery and equipment from Ukraine and Japan.

=== Vostochny cosmodrome ===
In July 2010, Prime Minister Vladimir Putin announced that the area would be the site of a new Vostochny Cosmodrome ("Eastern Spaceport"), to reduce Russian dependence on the Baikonur Cosmodrome in Kazakhstan. The first rocket launch from the site took place on 28 April 2016.

== Sister province ==
- Chungnam, South Korea
