= Sosnovy Bor =

Sosnovy Bor (Russian: Сосно́вый Бор; lit. pine forest (copse)) is the name of several inhabited localities in Russia.

== Amur Oblast ==
As of 2010, one rural locality in Amur Oblast bears this name:

- Sosnovy Bor, Amur Oblast, a selo in Sosnovoborsky Rural Settlement of Zeysky District

== Republic of Bashkortostan ==
As of 2010, three rural localities in the Republic of Bashkortostan bear this name:

- Sosnovy Bor, Belebeyevsky District, Republic of Bashkortostan, a village in Usen-Ivanovsky Selsoviet of Belebeyevsky District
- Sosnovy Bor, Birsky District, Republic of Bashkortostan, a village in Staropetrovsky Selsoviet of Birsky District
- Sosnovy Bor, Karaidelsky District, Republic of Bashkortostan, a village in Maginsky Selsoviet of Karaidelsky District

== Bryansk Oblast ==
As of 2010, one rural locality in Bryansk Oblast bears this name:

- Sosnovy Bor, Bryansk Oblast, a settlement in Spiridonovobudsky Rural Administrative Okrug of Zlynkovsky District

== Irkutsk Oblast ==
As of 2010, one rural locality in Irkutsk Oblast bears this name:

- Sosnovy Bor, Irkutsk Oblast, a village in Irkutsky District

== Kaluga Oblast ==
As of 2010, one rural locality in Kaluga Oblast bears this name:

- Sosnovy Bor, Kaluga Oblast, a selo under the administrative jurisdiction of the City of Kaluga

== Khanty-Mansi Autonomous Okrug ==
As of 2010, one rural locality in Khanty-Mansi Autonomous Okrug bears this name:

- Sosnovy bor, Khanty-Mansi Autonomous Okrug, a village in Nizhnevartovsky District

== Kirov Oblast ==
As of 2010, one rural locality in Kirov Oblast bears this name:

- Sosnovy Bor, Kirov Oblast, a settlement in Kuchelapovsky Rural Okrug of Orichevsky District

== Krasnoyarsk Krai ==
As of 2010, one rural locality in Krasnoyarsk Krai bears this name:

- Sosnovy Bor, Krasnoyarsk Krai, a settlement in Bolsheuluysky Selsoviet of Bolsheuluysky District

== Kursk Oblast ==
As of 2010, one rural locality in Kursk Oblast bears this name:

- Sosnovy Bor, Kursk Oblast, a station settlement in Belichansky Selsoviet of Belovsky District

== Leningrad Oblast ==
As of 2010, three inhabited localities in Leningrad Oblast bear this name.

Urban localities

- Sosnovy Bor, Leningrad Oblast, a town under the administrative jurisdiction of Sosnovoborsky Municipal Formation with Urban Okrug Status

Rural localities

- Sosnovy Bor, Boksitogorsky District, Leningrad Oblast, a village under the administrative jurisdiction of Yefimovskoye Settlement Municipal Formation of Boksitogorsky District
- Sosnovy Bor, Vyborgsky District, Leningrad Oblast, a logging depot settlement in Polyanskoye Settlement Municipal Formation of Vyborgsky District

== Mari El Republic ==
As of 2010, one rural locality in the Mari El Republic bears this name:

- Sosnovy Bor, Mari El Republic, a settlement in Sidorovsky Rural Okrug of Medvedevsky District

== Republic of Mordovia ==
As of 2010, one rural locality in the Republic of Mordovia bears this name:

- Sosnovy Bor, Republic of Mordovia, a settlement under the administrative jurisdiction of the town of republic significance of Kovylkino

== Moscow Oblast ==
As of 2010, one rural locality in Moscow Oblast bears this name:

- Sosnovy Bor, Moscow Oblast, a settlement in Lagovskoye Rural Settlement of Podolsky District

== Nizhny Novgorod Oblast ==
As of 2010, two rural localities in Nizhny Novgorod Oblast bear this name:

- Sosnovy Bor, Bor, Nizhny Novgorod Oblast, a settlement in Sitnikovsky Selsoviet of the town of oblast significance of Bor
- Sosnovy Bor, Shatkovsky District, Nizhny Novgorod Oblast, a settlement in Silinsky Selsoviet of Shatkovsky District

== Novgorod Oblast ==
As of 2010, one rural locality in Novgorod Oblast bears this name:

- Sosnovy Bor, Novgorod Oblast, a village in Utorgoshskoye Settlement of Shimsky District

== Perm Krai ==
As of 2010, one rural locality in Perm Krai bears this name:

- Sosnovy Bor, Perm Krai, a village in Osinsky District

== Pskov Oblast ==
As of 2010, two inhabited localities in Pskov Oblast bear this name.

Urban localities

- Sosnovy Bor, Sebezhsky District, Pskov Oblast, a work settlement in Sebezhsky District

Rural localities

- Sosnovy Bor, Porkhovsky District, Pskov Oblast, a village in Porkhovsky District

== Sverdlovsk Oblast ==
As of 2010, two rural localities in Sverdlovsk Oblast bear this name:

- Sosnovy Bor, Artyomovsky District, Sverdlovsk Oblast, a settlement in Artyomovsky District
- Sosnovy Bor, Nizhneserginsky District, Sverdlovsk Oblast, a village in Nizhneserginsky District

== Republic of Tatarstan ==
As of 2010, one rural locality in the Republic of Tatarstan bears this name:

- Sosnovy Bor, Republic of Tatarstan, a settlement in Tukayevsky District

== Tver Oblast ==
As of 2010, one rural locality in Tver Oblast bears this name:

- Sosnovy Bor, Tver Oblast, a village in Gusevskoye Rural Settlement of Oleninsky District

== Udmurt Republic ==
As of 2010, two rural localities in the Udmurt Republic bear this name:

- Sosnovy Bor, Kezsky District, Udmurt Republic, a village in Sosnovoborsky Selsoviet of Kezsky District
- Sosnovy Bor, Mozhginsky District, Udmurt Republic, a village in Malovalozhikyinsky Selsoviet of Mozhginsky District

== Ulyanovsk Oblast ==
As of 2010, one rural locality in Ulyanovsk Oblast bears this name:

- Sosnovy Bor, Ulyanovsk Oblast, a settlement in Sosnovoborsky Rural Okrug of Bazarnosyzgansky District

== Vladimir Oblast ==
As of 2010, two rural localities in Vladimir Oblast bear this name:

- Sosnovy Bor, Petushinsky District, Vladimir Oblast, a settlement in Petushinsky District
- Sosnovy Bor, Yuryev-Polsky District, Vladimir Oblast, a selo in Yuryev-Polsky District

== Vologda Oblast ==
As of 2010, one rural locality in Vologda Oblast bears this name:

- Sosnovy Bor, Vologda Oblast, a village in Sholsky Selsoviet of Belozersky District

== Yaroslavl Oblast ==
As of 2010, one rural locality in Yaroslavl Oblast bears this name:

- Sosnovy Bor, Yaroslavl Oblast, a settlement in Nikolsky Rural Okrug of Nekrasovsky District

== See also ==
- Sosnovy Bor (garrison), Buryatia, Russia
- Sasnovy Bor, several inhabited localities in Belarus called 'Sosnovy Bor' in Russian
