= Khvoyny =

Khvoyny (Russian: Хво́йный; masculine), Khvoynaya (Хво́йная; feminine), or Khvoynoye (Хво́йное; neuter) is the name of several inhabited localities in Russia.

Urban localities

- Khvoynaya, Khvoyninsky District, Novgorod Oblast, a work settlement in Khvoyninsky District of Novgorod Oblast

Rural localities

- Khvoyny, Amur Oblast, a settlement in Khvoynensky Rural Settlement of Zeysky District of Amur Oblast
- Khvoyny, Irkutsk Oblast, a settlement in Bratsky District of Irkutsk Oblast
- Khvoyny, Republic of Karelia, a settlement in Belomorsky District of the Republic of Karelia
- Khvoyny, Krasnoyarsk Krai, a settlement in Balaysky Selsoviet of Uyarsky District of Krasnoyarsk Krai
- Khvoyny, Moscow Oblast, a settlement in Dorokhovskoye Rural Settlement of Orekhovo-Zuyevsky District of Moscow Oblast
- Khvoyny, Omsk Oblast, a settlement in Pushkinsky Rural Okrug of Omsky District of Omsk Oblast
- Khvoyny, Vladimir Oblast, a selo in Yuryev-Polsky District of Vladimir Oblast
- Khvoyny, Zabaykalsky Krai, a settlement in Chitinsky District of Zabaykalsky Krai
- Khvoynoye, Leningrad Oblast, a logging depot settlement in Melnikovskoye Settlement Municipal Formation of Priozersky District of Leningrad Oblast
- Khvoynoye, Semyonov, Nizhny Novgorod Oblast, a village in Ogibnovsky Selsoviet of the town of oblast significance of Semyonov, Nizhny Novgorod Oblast
- Khvoynoye, Tonkinsky District, Nizhny Novgorod Oblast, a village in Bolshesodomovsky Selsoviet of Tonkinsky District of Nizhny Novgorod Oblast
- Khvoynaya, Soletsky District, Novgorod Oblast, a village in Vybitskoye Settlement of Soletsky District of Novgorod Oblast
