= Zeya Nature Reserve =

Nature reserve in Amur Oblast, Russia

- Russian: Зейский заповедник (Also: Zeysky)
- IUCN category Ia (strict nature reserve)
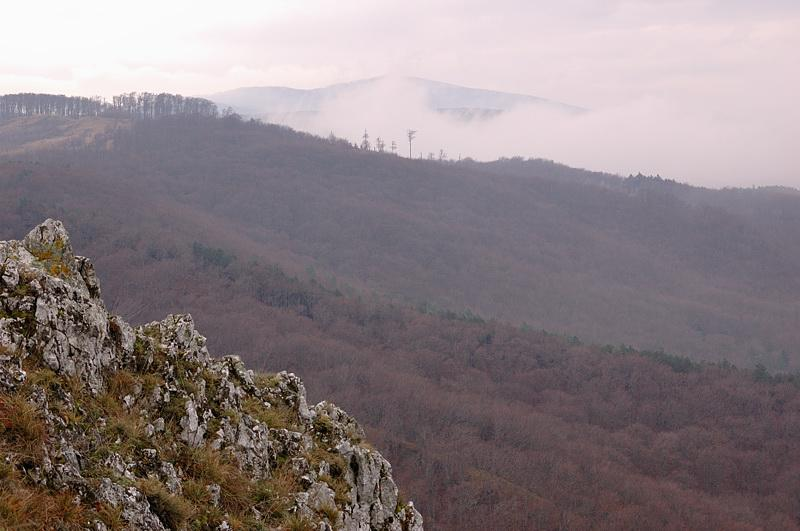
- Zeya Zapovednik

- Location within Russia
- Location: Amur Oblast
- Nearest city: Zeya
- Coordinates: 53°57′46″N 127°22′21″E
- Area: 99,390 hectares (245,598 acres; 384 sq mi)
- Established: 1963
- Governing body: Ministry of Natural Resources and Environment (Russia)

Zeya Nature Reserve (Russian: Зейский заповедник) (also Zeysky) is a Russian 'zapovednik' (strict nature reserve) located over the mountainous headwaters of the Zeya River, on the eastern end of the Tukuringra Range, where it joins the Dzhagdy, in the Amur Region of the Russian Far East. It was created in part to serve as a "reference plot" for the study of the ecological impact of the Zeya Dam and the Zeya Reservoir which were built in the 1960s and 1970s. The ground cover in the reserve is primarily taiga, of mostly larch and Mongolian oak. The reserve is situated 13 km north of the city of Zeya, in the Zeysky District of Amur Oblast.

== Topography ==
The Zeya Reserve about 150 km north of the border with China, on the northwest bank of the Zeya river, which is a left tributary of the Amur River, which is flowing east at this point. The reserve is rectangular in shape, running in a northwesterly direction for about 60 km up the Tukuringra Ridge with a width of about 20 km. the Tukuringra Ridge is part of a system of ridges ("Janka-Tukuringra-Soktahan-Dzhagdy"). The altitudes above sea level in the territory are 40% below 700 m, 35% from 700 to 000, 18% from 1,000 to 1,300 m, and 7% greater than 1,300 meters. There are over 200 streams and small rivers spread evenly over the territory. They have the character of mountain waterways: steep narrow valleys, sharp drops and rapids. In the winter they freeze to the bottom. The main rocks are gneisses, and the soils the product of weatherized gneisses.

== Climate and Ecoregion ==
Zeya is located in the Da Hinggan-Dzhagdy Mountains conifer forests ecoregion. This is a region of inland plains surrounded by low hills and the Greater Khingan mountain range, a forested area connecting China (Manchuria) and Russia (Amur River basin). Trees are southern taiga in the Russian sections, and Mongolian larch forests with mixed pine and fir in the Chinese forests.

The climate of Zeya is Subarctic climate, dry winters (Köppen climate classification (Dwc)). This climate is characterized by long, very cold winters, and cool summers. but with little snow in winters. Average temperatures in the reserve are -28.8 C in January, and +19.7 in July. Average rainfall is 515 mm per year. Winds are from the north-northeast in autumn and winter, and from the south-southwest in spring and summer.

== Flora and fauna ==
Over 90% of the reserve is forested, with trees characteristic of the transition zone from southern to northern taiga. Altitude zoning determines the predominant trees at different heights. From 350 to 500 meters the dominant trees are oak and black birch. From 500 to 1,000 meters the dominant trees are larch, with stands of birch, spruce and aspen. The under-story of this larch forest is mostly cranberries, wild rosemary marsh, Dahurian rhododendron and mosses. From 1,000 to 1,300 is a belt of dark taiga, mostly spruce and fir. Above the dark taiga, the ridgetops are covered with cedar, and accompanying Siberian juniper and rhododendron. For animals, the ridges of the region act as meeting zones and highways for representative species of many faunal complexes - East Siberian (Angara) fauna, Manchu, Daur, Mongolian, Okhotsk-Kamchatka and fauna of the Far Eastern highlands.

== Ecotourism ==
As a strict nature reserve, the Zeya Reserve is mostly closed to the general public, although scientists and those with 'environmental education' purposes can make arrangements with park management for visits. There are three 'ecotourist' routes in the reserve, however, that are open to the public, but require permits to be obtained in advance. The three are:

- "Twentieth" EcoTrail. A 3 km educational hike, suitable for schoolchildren and the elderly. Instruction on the plants and animals of the territory, and the scientific work of the reserve.
- "Tourist Route Kamenshua-Loaches". 16 km hike (2 days). Closed during winter and bear mating season. Certain vaccinations required against tick-borne diseases. Hike to the top of the ridge, with viewpoints.
- "Tourist Route Erikingra-Loaches". 20 km hike (3 days). Hike and climb through variety of terrain. For more active visitors with a more scientific focus.

The main office is in the city of Zeya.

== See also ==
- List of Russian Nature Reserves (class 1a 'zapovedniks')
