= Bomnak =

Bomnak Бомнак
- Selo
- Interactive map of Bomnak
- Location of Bomnak Bomnak (Amur Oblast)
- Coordinates: 54°43′N 128°51′E
- Country: Russia
- Federal subject: Amur Oblast
- Administrative district: Zeysky District
- Founded: 1889
- Elevation: 357 m (1,171 ft)

Population
  - Estimate (2021): 411 )
- Time zone: UTC+9 (MSK+6)
- Postal code: 676226
- OKTMO ID: 10625412101

Bomnak (Russian: Бомнак) is a rural locality (a selo) in Zeysky District of Amur Oblast, Russia, located on the northern bank of Zeya Reservoir.

== Transportation ==
A local road leads west to Gorny and Verkhnezeysk. Closest airport is Zeya Airport.

== Climate ==
Bomnak has a dry-winter subarctic climate (Köppen climate classification Dwc) with dry, bitterly cold winters and warm, wet summers.

Climate data for Bomnak
Month	Jan	Feb	Mar	Apr	May	Jun	Jul	Aug	Sep	Oct	Nov	Dec	Year
Record high °C (°F)	−5.0 (23.0)	1.6 (34.9)	9.6 (49.3)	22.9 (73.2)	31.9 (89.4)	35.8 (96.4)	35.5 (95.9)	34.0 (93.2)	27.0 (80.6)	20.8 (69.4)	6.1 (43.0)	−1.1 (30.0)	35.8 (96.4)
Mean daily maximum °C (°F)	−25.5 (−13.9)	−17.2 (1.0)	−5.9 (21.4)	4.6 (40.3)	14.7 (58.5)	22.1 (71.8)	24.5 (76.1)	21.8 (71.2)	14.7 (58.5)	3.1 (37.6)	−14.2 (6.4)	−25.0 (−13.0)	1.5 (34.7)
Daily mean °C (°F)	−30.7 (−23.3)	−24.1 (−11.4)	−12.9 (8.8)	−1.1 (30.0)	8.2 (46.8)	15.1 (59.2)	18.1 (64.6)	15.5 (59.9)	8.4 (47.1)	−2.6 (27.3)	−19.4 (−2.9)	−29.6 (−21.3)	−4.6 (23.7)
Mean daily minimum °C (°F)	−36.0 (−32.8)	−31.0 (−23.8)	−20.2 (−4.4)	−7.1 (19.2)	1.8 (35.2)	8.5 (47.3)	12.3 (54.1)	10.2 (50.4)	3.1 (37.6)	−7.7 (18.1)	−24.6 (−12.3)	−34.3 (−29.7)	−10.4 (13.2)
Record low °C (°F)	−51.1 (−60.0)	−48.1 (−54.6)	−42.8 (−45.0)	−32.1 (−25.8)	−9.6 (14.7)	−3.4 (25.9)	−0.1 (31.8)	−1.4 (29.5)	−10.4 (13.3)	−31.7 (−25.1)	−45.6 (−50.1)	−52.1 (−61.8)	−52.1 (−61.8)
Average precipitation mm (inches)	4.7 (0.19)	4.7 (0.19)	10.0 (0.39)	31.2 (1.23)	50.4 (1.98)	81.0 (3.19)	124.1 (4.89)	123.1 (4.85)	74.1 (2.92)	33.2 (1.31)	20.2 (0.80)	8.7 (0.34)	565.4 (22.28)
Average precipitation days	3.1	2.5	2.4	3.7	4.9	5.9	6.3	6.3	5.3	4.0	4.5	4.1	53
Average relative humidity (%)	75.3	67.9	60.4	57.5	59.9	67.7	75.1	77.3	73.4	68.1	75.0	76.0	69.5
Mean monthly sunshine hours	114	164	223	219	228	246	233	208	163	146	106	85	2,135
Source: climatebase.ru (1953-2011)
