= Snezhnogorsky =

Snezhnogorsky Снежногорский
- Settlement
- Location within Amur Oblast Location within Russia
- Coordinates: 54°11′N 127°57′E
- Country: Russia
- Region: Amur Oblast
- District: Zeysky District
- Time zone: UTC+9:00

Snezhnogorsky (Russian: Снежногорский) is a rural locality (a settlement) in Snezhnogorsky Selsoviet of Zeysky District, Amur Oblast, Russia. The population was 342 as of 2018. There are 17 streets.

== Geography ==
Snezhnogorsky is located on the right bank of the Zeya Reservoir, 109 km northeast of Zeya (the district's administrative centre) by road. Zeya is the nearest rural locality.
