= Zarechnaya Sloboda =

Zarechnaya Sloboda Заречная Слобода
- Selo
- Location within Amur Oblast Location within Russia
- Coordinates: 53°43′N 127°16′E
- Country: Russia
- Region: Amur Oblast
- District: Zeysky District
- Time zone: UTC+9:00

Zarechnaya Sloboda (Russian: Заречная Слобода) is a rural locality (a selo) in Sosnovoborsky Selsoviet of Zeysky District, Amur Oblast, Russia. The population was 653 as of 2018. There are 11 streets.

== Geography ==
Zarechnaya Sloboda is located on the left bank of the Zeya River, 10 km south of Zeya (the district's administrative centre) by road. Zeya is the nearest rural locality.
