= Zeya =

Zeya may refer to:

== People ==
- Aung Zeya, full name of Alaungpaya, king of Burma in 1752–1760
- Zeya (Burmese actor) (1916–1996), Burmese actor and director
- Zeya Thaw (born 1981), alternative spelling of the name of Zayar Thaw, Burmese politician and hip-hop artist

== Places ==
- Zeya, Wenzhou, a town in Ouhai District, Wenzhou, Zhejiang, China
- Zeya (river), a river in Amur Oblast, Russia
- Zeya Dam, a dam on the Zeya River in Amur Oblast, Russia
- Zeya Urban Okrug, an administrative division and a municipal formation in Amur Oblast, Russia which the town of Zeya is incorporated as
- Zeya, Russia, a town in Amur Oblast, Russia
- Zeya (satellite), a Russian satellite launched using the Start-1 launch vehicle
