= Amuro-Baltiysk =

Amuro-Baltiysk Амуро-Балтийск
- Selo
- Location within Amur Oblast Location within Russia
- Coordinates: 53°30′N 126°47′E
- Country: Russia
- Region: Amur Oblast
- District: Zeysky District
- Time zone: UTC+9:00

Amuro-Baltiysk (Russian: Амуро-Балтийск) is a rural locality (a selo) and the administrative center of Amuro-Baltiysky Selsoviet of Zeysky District, Amur Oblast, Russia. The population was 199 as of 2018. There are 2 streets.

== Geography ==
Amuro-Baltiysk is located on the right bank of the Urkan River, 52 km southwest of Zeya (the district's administrative centre) by road. Ivanovka and Ovsyanka are the nearest rural localities.
