= Dzhagdy Range =

Mountain range in Russia

- Хребет Джагды
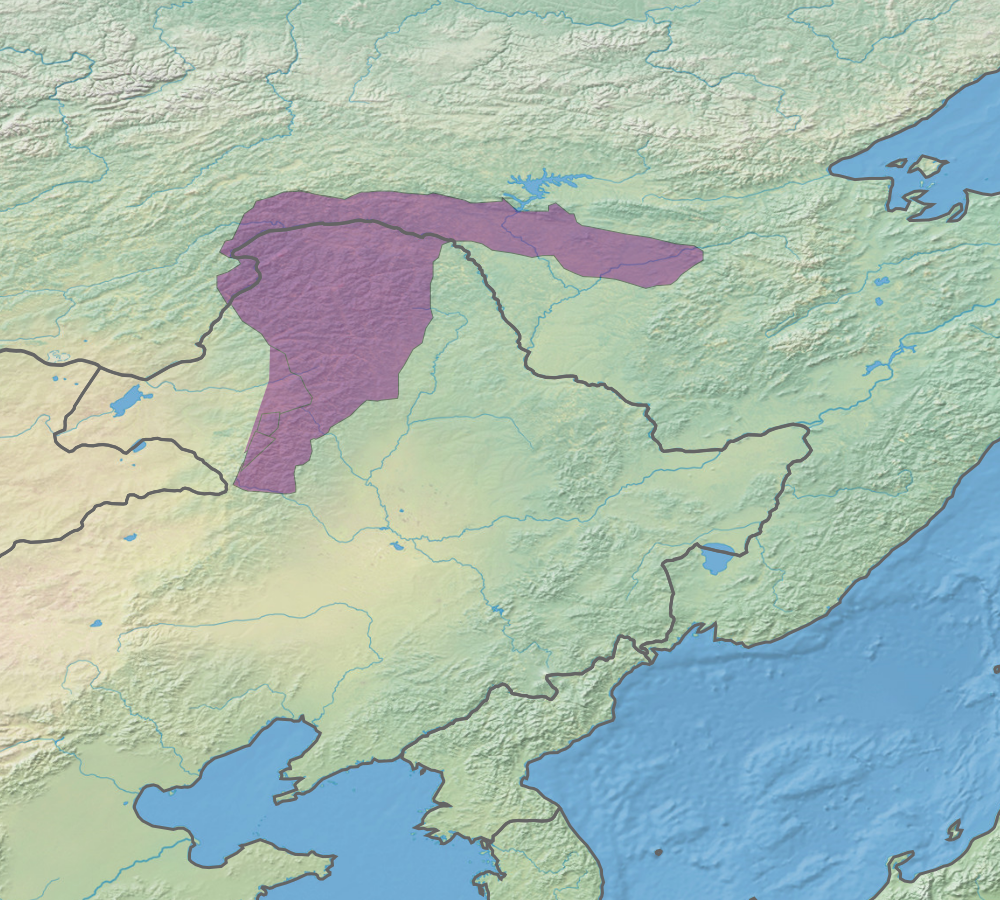
- Da Hinggan-Dzhagdy Mountains conifer forests ecoregion

Highest point
- Peak: Unnamed
- Elevation: 1,604 m (5,262 ft)

Dimensions
- Length: 250 km (160 mi) E/W

Geography
- Location within Far Eastern Federal District
- Location: Amur Oblast, Khabarovsk Krai, Russian Far East
- Range coordinates: 53°30′N 131°0′E
- Parent range: Eastern Siberian Mountains
- Borders on: Tukuringra Range

Geology
- Orogeny: Alpine orogeny

Climbing
- Easiest route: From Zeya

The Dzhagdy Range (Russian: Хребет Джагды) is a range of mountains in far Northeastern Russia. Administratively it belongs partly to Amur Oblast and partly to the Khabarovsk Krai of the Russian Federation.

== Geography ==
The Dzhagdy is a range in northeastern Siberia, located in the northeast of Amur Oblast and the western side of Khabarovsk Krai. It is part of the Yankan - Tukuringra - Soktakhan - Dzhagdy group of mountain ranges (which also includes the Turan Range), being the easternmost of the group. The Upper Zeya Plain lies between this alignment of ranges and the Stanovoy Range to the north.

The Dzhagdy Range is limited by the Zeya River valley to the north and west, where Zeya town is located. The Tukuringra Range joins the Soktakhan and the Dzhagdy on the area of the Zeya Dam. To the north flows the Uda River and in the south lies the Zeya-Bureya Lowland. To the southeast the Selemdzha Range continues further eastwards. The highest point of the Dzhagdy is an unnamed peak reaching 1,604 metres (5,262 ft). The Nora and Orlovka, tributaries of the Selemdzha, have their sources in the range.

== Flora and fauna ==
The slopes of the range are covered by conifer forests, part of the Da Hinggan-Dzhagdy Mountains conifer forests ecoregion, together with the Greater Khingan (Da Hinggan) Range of Manchuria, China. The Zeya Nature Reserve is located at the eastern end of the Tukuringra Range, where it joins the Dzhagdy.

The lower altitudes of the range provide a habitat for the Siberian Salamander.

== See also ==
- Northeast Siberian taiga
- Palearctic realm
- Temperate coniferous forest
