= Ovsyanka, Amur Oblast =

Ovsyanka Овсянка
- Selo
- Location within Amur Oblast Location within Russia
- Coordinates: 53°34′N 126°53′E
- Country: Russia
- Region: Amur Oblast
- District: Zeysky District
- Time zone: UTC+9:00

Ovsyanka (Russian: Овсянка) is a rural locality (a selo) in Ovsyankovsky Selsoviet of Zeysky District, Amur Oblast, Russia. The population was 2,910 as of 2018. There are 42 streets.

== Geography ==
Ovsyanka is located on the right bank of the Zeya River, 36 km southwest of Zeya (the district's administrative centre) by road. Alexandrovka is the nearest rural locality.
