= Nora Nature Reserve =

Nature reserve in Amur Oblast, Russia

- Russian: Норский заповедник (Also: Norsky)
- IUCN category Ia (strict nature reserve)
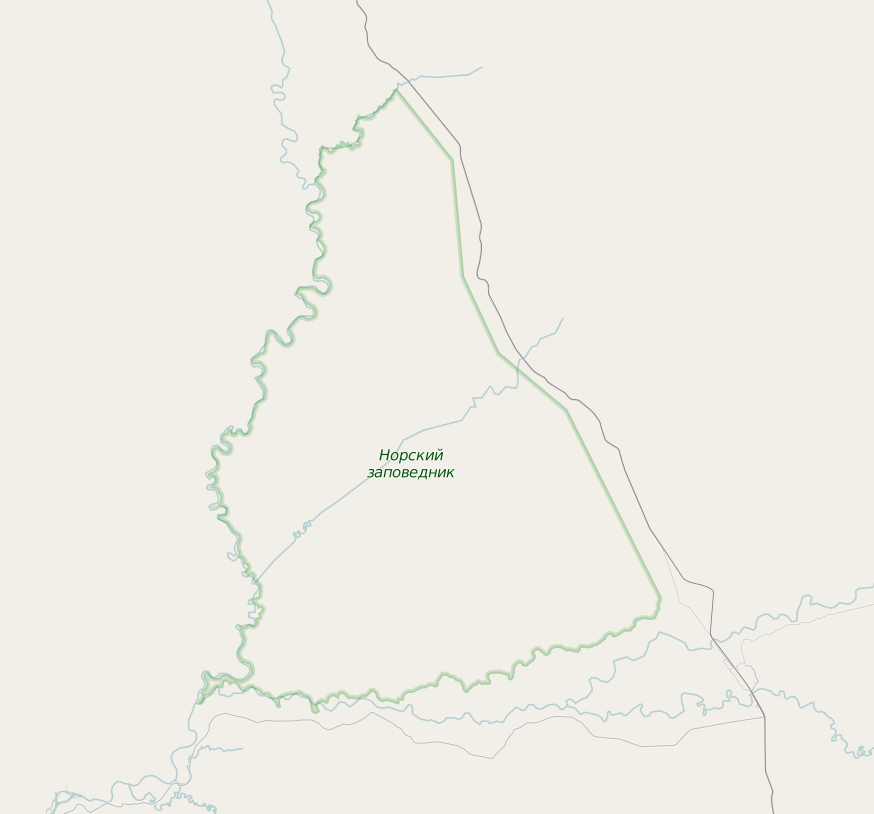
- Nora Zapovednik (borders)

- Location within Russia
- Location: Amur Oblast
- Nearest city: Fevralsk
- Coordinates: 52°30′4″N 130°17′33″E
- Area: 211,168 hectares (521,807 acres; 815 sq mi)
- Established: 1998
- Governing body: Ministry of Natural Resources and Environment (Russia)
- Website: http://norzap.ru/

Nora Nature Reserve (Russian: Норский заповедник) (also Norsky) is a Russian 'zapovednik' (strict nature reserve) on the northeastern part of the Amur-Zeya lowland plain between the Nora River and the Selemdzha River. The reserve is known for its herd of Norsk roe deer, the largest migrating herd in the world, with 5,000-7,000 individuals migrating through every September. The terrain is half forested, and half wetland and bogs, in the meeting zone between Siberian, Okhotsk, and Mongolian plant and animal communities. The reserve is situated in the Selemdzhinsky District of Amur Oblast.

== Topography ==
The Nora Reserve is roughly triangular shaped, 50 km west-to-east across the base, and 70 km north-to-south. The western border follows the meandering Nora River (running north to south at this point), while the southern border follows the northern edge of the floodplain of the Selemdzha River (running east to west towards the Zeya River). The Nora and the Selemdzha meet at the southeastern corner of the Nora Reserve.

The terrain in the southern half is flat, with some gentle slopes and flat wetlands. The northern half of the site is hilly uplands with some points reaching 370 m (1,210 ft) in height. The Burunda River runs through the middle of the reserve from east to west, into the Nora. A notable land form in the flat areas is "thermokarst", which is a landscape of pothole lakes caused by upheaving domes of underground ice that leave a depression when they thaw in the summer. There are rocky outcrops in places, although most of the flat lands are built on Quaternary pebbles and smaller sediments.

== Climate and ecoregion ==
Nora is located in the Da Hinggan-Dzhagdy Mountains conifer forests ecoregion. This ecoregion is an area of inland plains surrounded by low hills and the Greater Khingan mountain range. It is a forested area connecting China (Manchuria) and Russia (Amur River basin), with southern taiga plant communities in the Russian sections, and Mongolian larch forests with mixed pine and fir in the Chinese forests.

The climate is Humid continental climate, warm summer subtype (Köppen climate classification (Dwb)). The average temperature in January is -30.4 C degrees; the average in July is +19.4 C degrees. Low levels of rain in April and May often lead to forest fires. Winter lasts 5 - 5.5 months.

== Flora and fauna ==
Norsky is predominantly forest (54%) and marsh (most of the remainder). The forests are a erous and southern taiga (mixed broadleaf). The main forest-forming trees are dahurian larch (Larix gmelinii) and white birch (Betula papyrifera. There are pine forests along the Nora and Burundi rivers. The marshy areas, particularly in the southern plains spreading from the south of the reserve, feature extensive moss (green and sphagnum) hummocks of sedges, cotton grass, and reed grass. There are extensive thickets of wild rosemary and shrub birch. The swampy areas include blueberry and cranberry. There are areas of nemoral forest in the flatter lands, featuring linden, maple, elm, and barberry. Scientists on the reserve have recorded 513 species of vascular plants, representing about 25% of the species found in the Amur region.

The animal life of the reserve includes representatives of four faunal zones: Eastern Siberia, Okhotsk-Kamchatka, Amur, and Daur-Mongolian. As a result, the Nora protected area includes 43% of all mammal species of the Amur and Primorsky (maritime) regions of the Russian Far East. Many of these mammals are living on the edges of their ranges. Characteristic vertebrates include Siberian roe deer, bear, elk, Siberian salamander, Far Eastern frog, gray-sided vole, East Asian mouse, squirrel, chipmunk, sable, and various waterfowl and birds. Two exotic species were introduced in the 1950s - the American mink and muskrat. 232 species of birds have been recorded in the reserve. The rich levels of fish in the wetland lakes and ponds attract predatory birds - eagles, ospreys, and fish owls.

== Ecoeducation and access ==
As a strict ecological reserve, the Nora Reserve is mostly closed to the general public, although scientists and those with 'environmental education' purposes can make arrangements with park management for visits. The public can look into the reserve from water tours along the river borders, particularly Nora River on the western side of the reserve. The main office is in the city of Fevralsk.

== See also ==
- List of Russian Nature Reserves (class 1a 'zapovedniks')
