= Dugda, Russia =

Dugda Дугда
- Settlement
- Location within Amur Oblast Location within Russia
- Coordinates: 53°20′N 130°00′E
- Country: Russia
- Region: Amur Oblast
- District: Zeysky District
- Time zone: UTC+9:00

Dugda (Russian: Дугда) is a rural locality (a settlement) in Dugdinsky Selsoviet of Zeysky District, Amur Oblast, Russia. The population was 689 as of 2018. There are 11 streets.

== Geography ==
Dugda is located on the Baikal–Amur Mainline, 286 km southeast of Zeya (the district's administrative centre) by road. Tungala is the nearest rural locality.
