= Ogoron =

Ogoron Огорон
- Settlement
- Location within Amur Oblast Location within Russia
- Coordinates: 53°57′N 129°08′E
- Country: Russia
- Region: Amur Oblast
- District: Zeysky District
- Time zone: UTC+9:00

Ogoron (Russian: Огорон) is a rural locality (a settlement) in Ogoronsky Selsoviet of Zeysky District, Amur Oblast, Russia. The population was 278 as of 2018. There are 4 streets.

== Geography ==
Ogoron is located on Baikal–Amur Mainline, 173 km east of Zeya (the district's administrative centre) by road. Zeya is the nearest rural locality.
