= Sosnovy Bor, Amur Oblast =

Sosnovy Bor Сосновый Бор
- Selo
- Location within Amur Oblast Location within Russia
- Coordinates: 53°42′N 127°10′E
- Country: Russia
- Region: Amur Oblast
- District: Zeysky District
- Time zone: UTC+9:00

Sosnovy Bor (Russian: Сосновый Бор) is a rural locality (a selo) and the administrative center of Sosnovorovsky Selsoviet of Zeysky District, Amur Oblast, Russia. The population was 761 as of 2018. There are 19 streets.

== Geography ==
Sosnovy Bor is located 8 km southwest of Zeya (the district's administrative centre) by road. Zeya is the nearest rural locality.
