= Da Hinggan–Dzhagdy Mountains conifer forests =

Ecoregion in the Khingan Mountains

Da Hinggan-Dzhagdy Mountains conifer forests
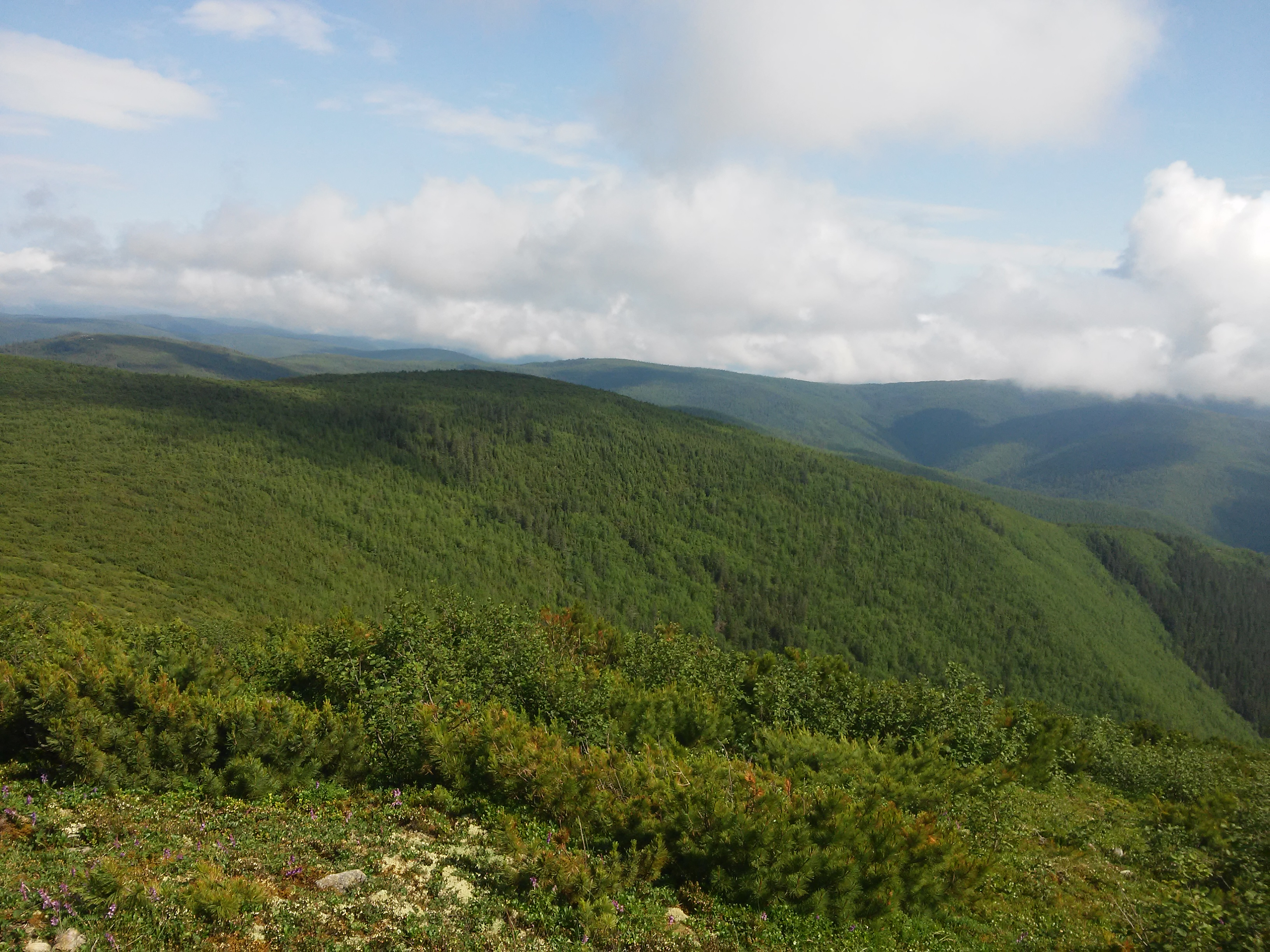
- Zeya Nature Reserve, Russia

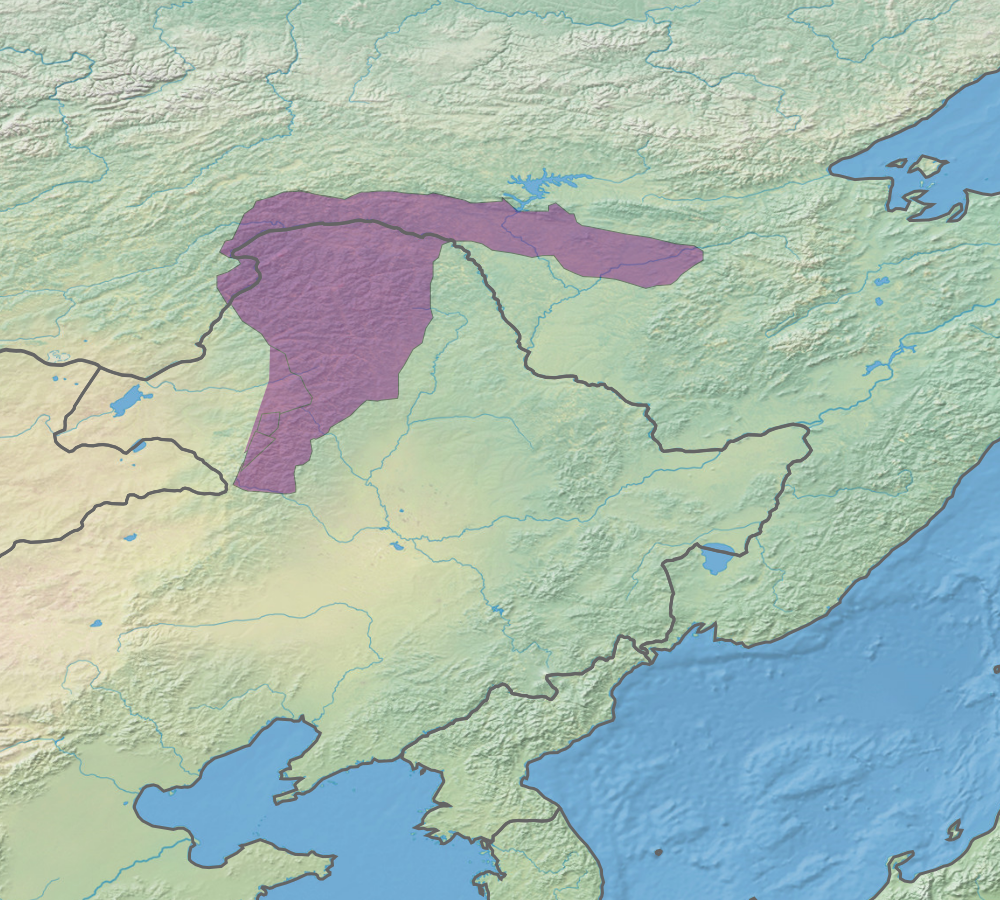
- Ecoregion territory (in purple)

Ecology
- Realm: Palearctic
- Biome: temperate coniferous forests

Geography
- Area: 248,380 km^{2} (95,900 mi^{2})
- Countries: Russia; China
- Coordinates: 51.75°N 123.75°E

The Da Hinggan-Dzhagdy Mountains conifer forests ecoregion (WWF ID: PA0505) covers the Greater Khingan Mountains of Northeast China, and across the border north into the Russian Far East where it follows the mountain ridge for another 500 km to the east. The mountain forests exhibit a floral community called "Daurian flora", a combination of the Siberian taiga to the north and the Manchurian floral types to the south. The eastern slopes are steep and drained by many rivers, the western slopes are gentler, and there are grasslands on some slopes. The ecoregion is in the Palearctic realm, with a subarctic climate. It covers 35,199,998 km^{2} (13,590,795 sq mi).

== Location and description ==
The ecoregion covers the Greater Khingan mountains in Northeast China and crosses the Amur River north into the Dzhagdy in Russia. In China, this is in the northern parts of Inner Mongolia Autonomous Region and Heilongjiang Province. In Russia, most of the region is in Amur Oblast.

== Climate ==
Because of its altitude and distance from the ocean, the ecoregion has a Subarctic climate, dry winter (Köppen climate classification Subarctic climate (Dwc)). This climate is characterized by mild summers (only 1-3 months above 10 °C (50.0 °F)) and cold winters having monthly precipitation less than one-tenth of the wettest summer month. These climate regions tend to be found at higher elevations in the middle of continents, with wide differences between day and night temperatures.

Climate at 51.75 N, 123.75 E

Climate chart (precipitation, max. and min. temperature)
J	F	M	A	M	J	J	A	S	O	N	D
0.1 −7 −36	0.1 5 −30	0.3 21 −13	0.9 42 15	1.4 58 29	3.1 70 40	4.8 74 48	4.3 69 44	2 57 32	0.6 39 12	0.3 12 −15	0.2 −5 −31
- █ Average max. and min. temperatures in °F
- █ Precipitation totals in inches
- Source: GlobalSpecies.org
Metric conversion
J	F	M	A	M	J	J	A	S	O	N	D
2.5 −22 −38	2.5 −15 −34	7.6 −6 −25	23 6 −10	36 15 −2	79 21 4	122 23 9	109 21 7	51 14 0	15 4 −11	7.6 −11 −26	5.1 −21 −35
- █ Average max. and min. temperatures in °C
- █ Precipitation totals in mm

== Flora and fauna ==
Because the ecoregion forms a transition zone between northern (Siberian) taiga and southern (Manchurian) flora types, it features examples of both - approximately two-thirds of the 1,200 local species of vascular plants are Siberian, the other third Manchurian, Daurian and Mongolian. This combination of floral communities is sometimes referred to as "Daurian flora". The dominant trees are Dahurian larch (Larix gmelinii), with pine and spruce stands. Mongolian oak (Quercus mongolica), hazel, alder, birch, poplars and elms also can be found at lower elevation. The area is one of the few remaining large tracts of forest in China, but was also the scene of the largest forest fire in modern Chinese history (over 1 million hectares in 1987).

== Protections ==
The federally protected areas in the region are:

- Nora Nature Reserve ("Norsky"). An IUCN class Ia "strict ecological reserve" (a Zapovednik) located in the northwest section of the ecoregion, north of the Russia-China border. Nora is representative of the northeastern part of the Amur-Zeya lowland plain between the Nora River and the Selemdzha River. The reserve is half forested, and half bogs. (Area: 211,168 km2).
- Zeya Nature Reserve ("Zeysky"). An IUCN class Ia "strict ecological reserve" (a Zapovednik) located in the north-central section of the ecoregion, in the mountainous headwaters of the Zeya River. The area is heavily forested, mostly with larch and Mongolian oak. (Area: 99,390 km2).

== See also ==
- List of ecoregions in Russia
