= Khvoyny, Amur Oblast =

Khvoyny Хвойный
- Settlement
- Location within Amur Oblast Location within Russia
- Coordinates: 54°35′N 127°50′E
- Country: Russia
- Region: Amur Oblast
- District: Zeysky District
- Time zone: UTC+9:00

Khvoyny (Russian: Хвойный) is a rural locality (a settlement) in Khvoynensky Selsoviet of Zeysky District, Amur Oblast, Russia. The population was 225 as of 2018. There are 11 streets.

== Geography ==
Khvoyny is located on the west bank of the Zeya Reservoir, 347 km northeast of Zeya (the district's administrative centre) by road. Im. Generala Milko is the nearest rural locality.

Closest airport is Zeya Airport.
