= Verkhnezeysk =

Verkhnezeysk Верхнезейск
- Settlement
- Location within Amur Oblast Location within Russia
- Coordinates: 54°37′N 128°32′E
- Country: Russia
- Region: Amur Oblast
- District: Zeysky District
- Time zone: UTC+9:00

Verkhnezeysk (Russian: Верхнезейск) is a rural locality (a settlement) and the administrative center of Verkhnezeysky Selsoviet of Zeysky District, Amur Oblast, Russia. The population was 1366 as of 2018. There are 14 streets.

== Geography ==
Verkhnezeysk is located on the north-east bank of the Zeya reservoir, 250 km northeast of Zeya (the district's administrative centre) by road. Gorny is the nearest rural locality.
