= Beregovoy, Russia =

Beregovoy Береговой
- Settlement
- Location within Amur Oblast Location within Russia
- Coordinates: 54°21′N 127°29′E
- Country: Russia
- Region: Amur Oblast
- District: Zeysky District
- Time zone: UTC+9:00

Beregovoy (Russian: Береговой) is a rural locality (a settlement) and the administrative center of Beregovoy Selsoviet of Zeysky District, Amur Oblast, Russia. The population was 1412 as of 2018. There are 10 streets.

== Geography ==
Beregovoy is located on the right bank of the Zeya reservoir, 167 km north of Zeya (the district's administrative centre) by road. Zoltoaya Gora is the nearest rural locality.

Closest airport is Zeya Airport.
