= Zeya Dam =

Dam in Zeya, Amur, Russia

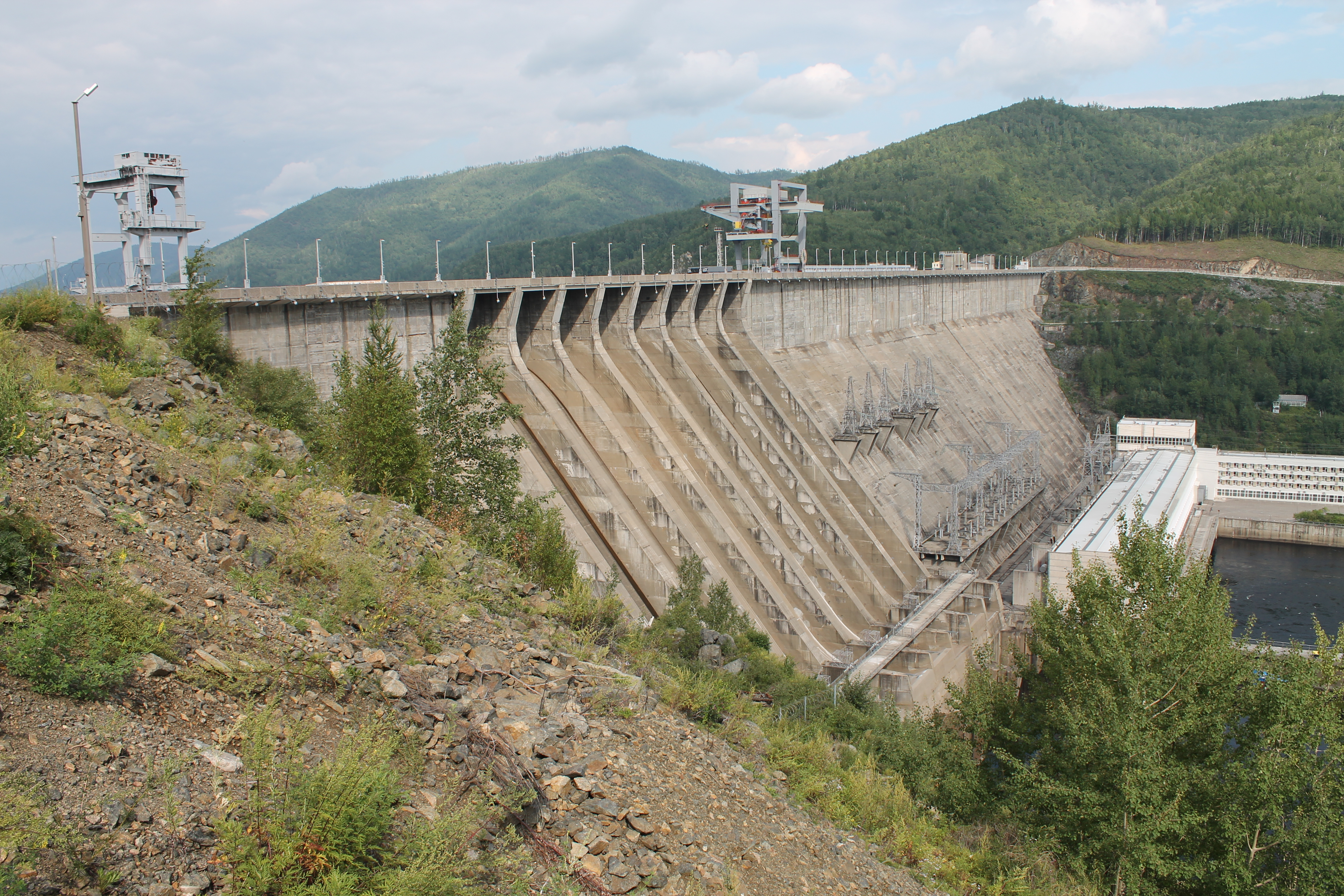

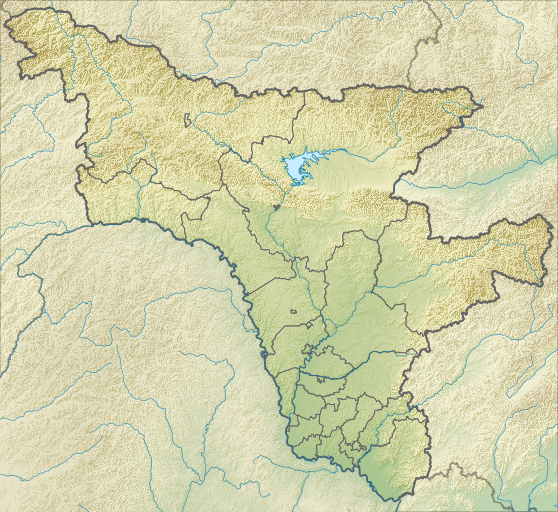
- Location of the Zeya Dam in Amur Oblast, Russia
- Country: Russia
- Location: Zeya, Amur Oblast
- Coordinates: 53°46′9″N 127°18′23″E
- Purpose: Power
- Status: Operational
- Construction began: 1965
- Opening date: 1975
- Owner: RusHydro

Dam and spillways
- Type of dam: Gravity dam
- Impounds: Zeya River
- Height: 115.5 m (379 ft)
- Length: 1,284 m (4,213 ft)
- Spillways: 8
- Spillway type: Surface spillway
- Spillway capacity: 11,104 m^{3}/s (392,100 cu ft/s)

Reservoir
- Creates: Zeya Reservoir (Russian: Зейское водохранилище)
- Total capacity: 68.4 ML (55.5 acre⋅ft)
- Surface area: 2,420 km^{2} (930 sq mi)
- Maximum length: 225 km (140 mi)
- Maximum width: 40 km (25 mi)
- Maximum water depth: 93 m (305 ft)

Zeya Hydroelectric Plant (Russian: Зейская ГЭС)
- Coordinates: 53°46′11″N 127°18′19″E
- Operator: RusHydro
- Commission date: 1975
- Type: Conventional
- Turbines: 4 × 225 MW (302,000 hp); 2 × 215 MW (288,000 hp)
- Installed capacity: 1.33 GW (1.78×10^{6} hp)
- Annual generation: 4.91 TWh (17.7 PJ)

The Zeya Dam is a concrete gravity dam on the Zeya River by the town of Zeya, Amur Oblast, Russia, north of the Chinese border. On average the Zeya Hydroelectric Power Station generates 4.91 terawatt-hours (17.7 PJ) of electricity per year. It is equipped with six hydro-turbines, four with capacity of 225 megawatts (0.302×10^{6} hp) and two with capacity of 215 MW (0.288×10^{6} hp).

== Overview ==
The Zeya Reservoir (Russian: Зейское водохранилище) is located in the upper course of the Zeya, below the southern foothills of the Toko-Stanovik, a subrange of the Stanovoy, to the north of the junction of the Tukuringra and Dzhagdy ranges. The reservoir is kept at a regulated depth of 93 metres (305 ft). A narrow, 40-kilometre-long (25 mi) valley separates the dam water body from the vast surface of the reservoir. The Baikal-Amur Mainline railway runs along the north shore, where a 1,100-metre-long (3,600 ft) bridge has been constructed.

Settlements on the shore of Zeya Dam include Beregovoy, Khvoyny, Gorny, Verknezeysk, Bomnak and Snezhnogorsk.

== Gallery ==
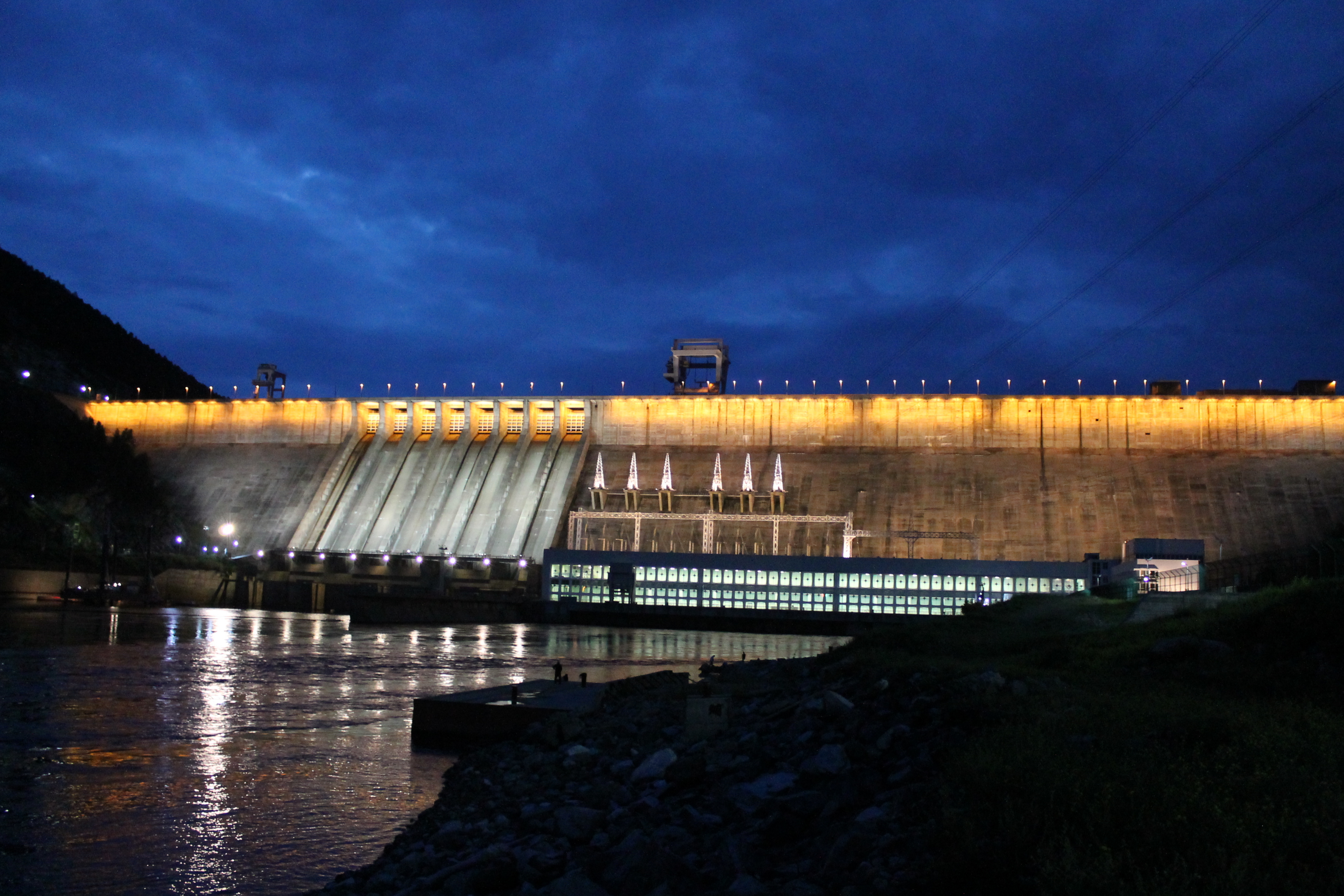
The dam at night

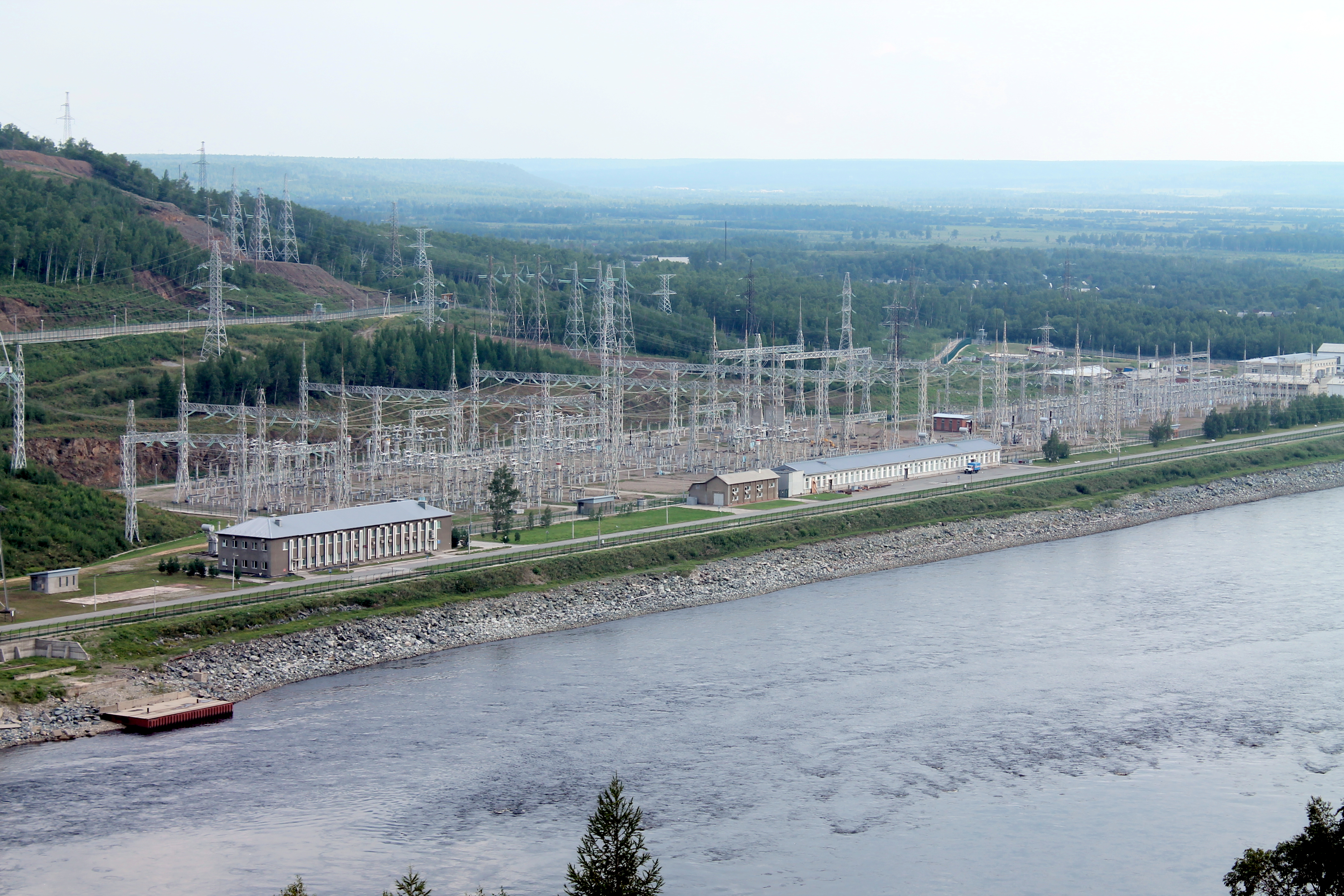

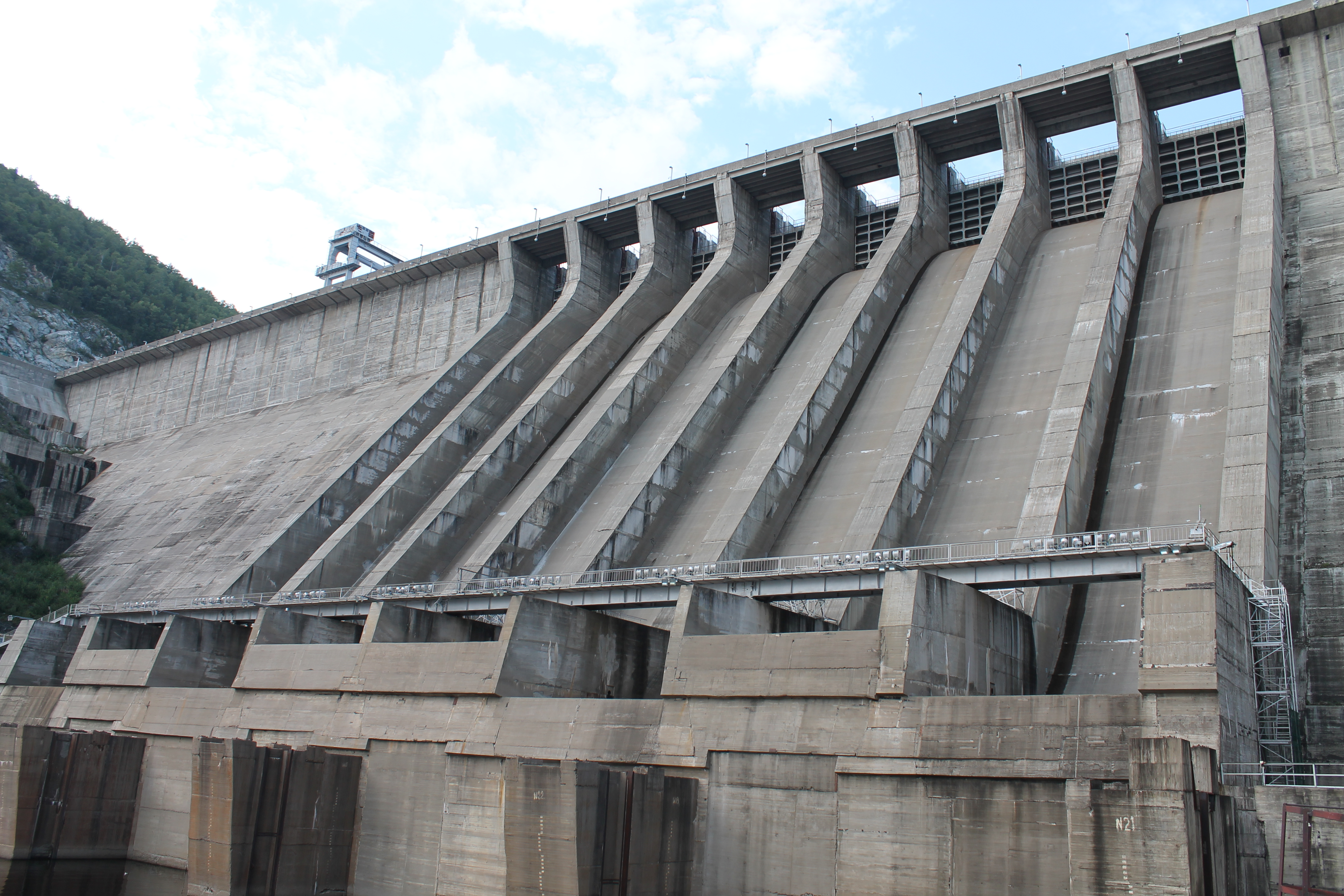
Spillway

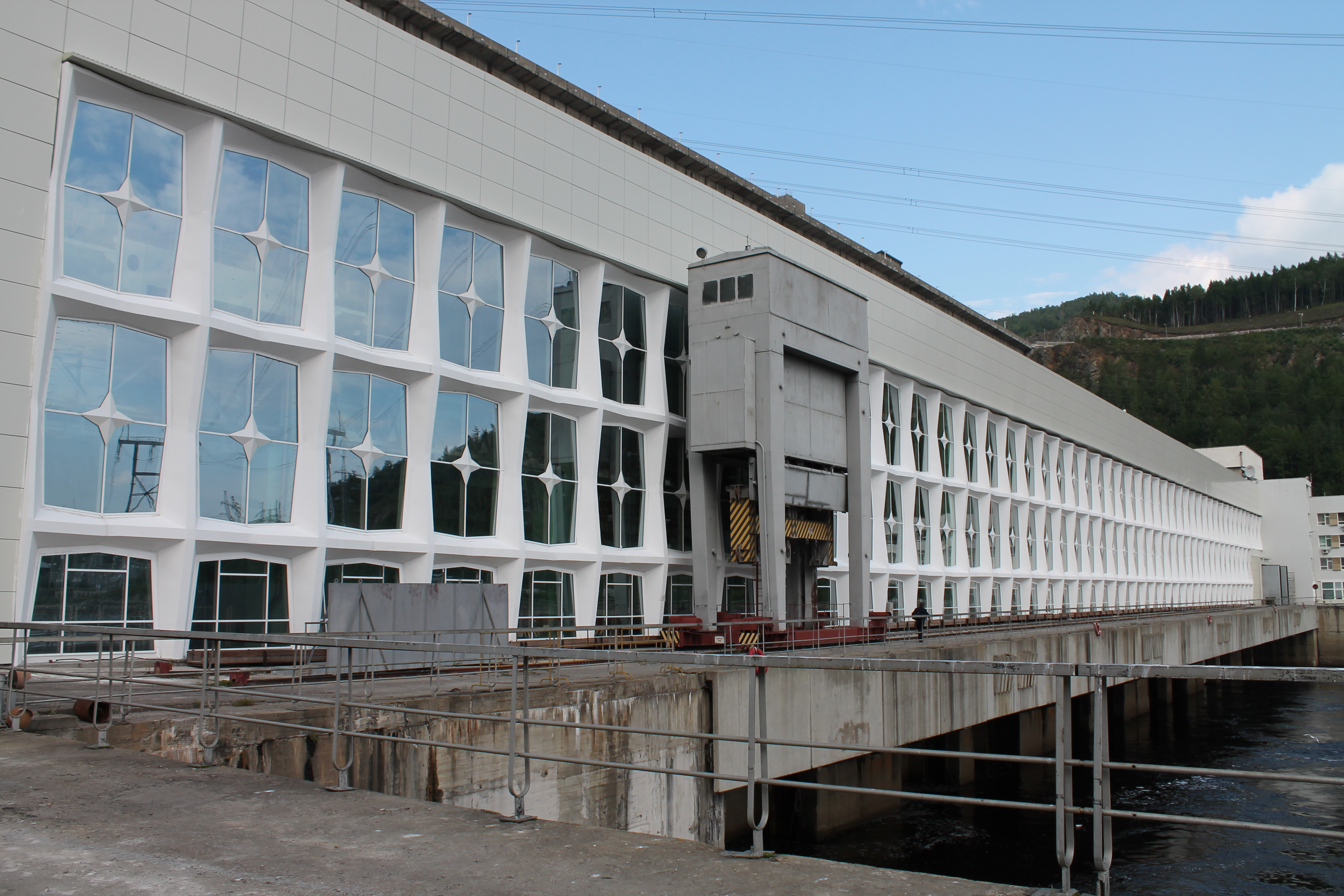
External of the dam plant building

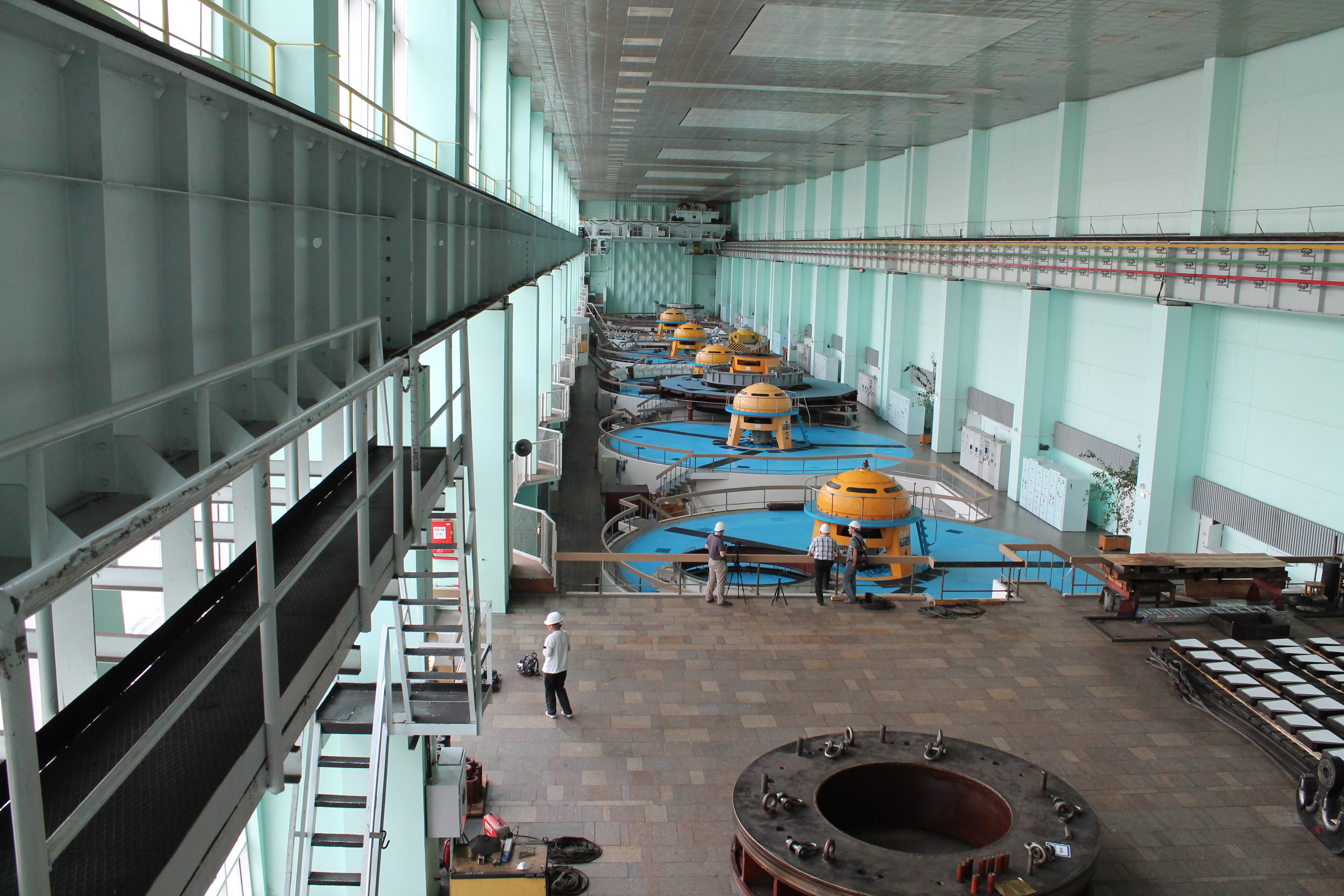
The machine room

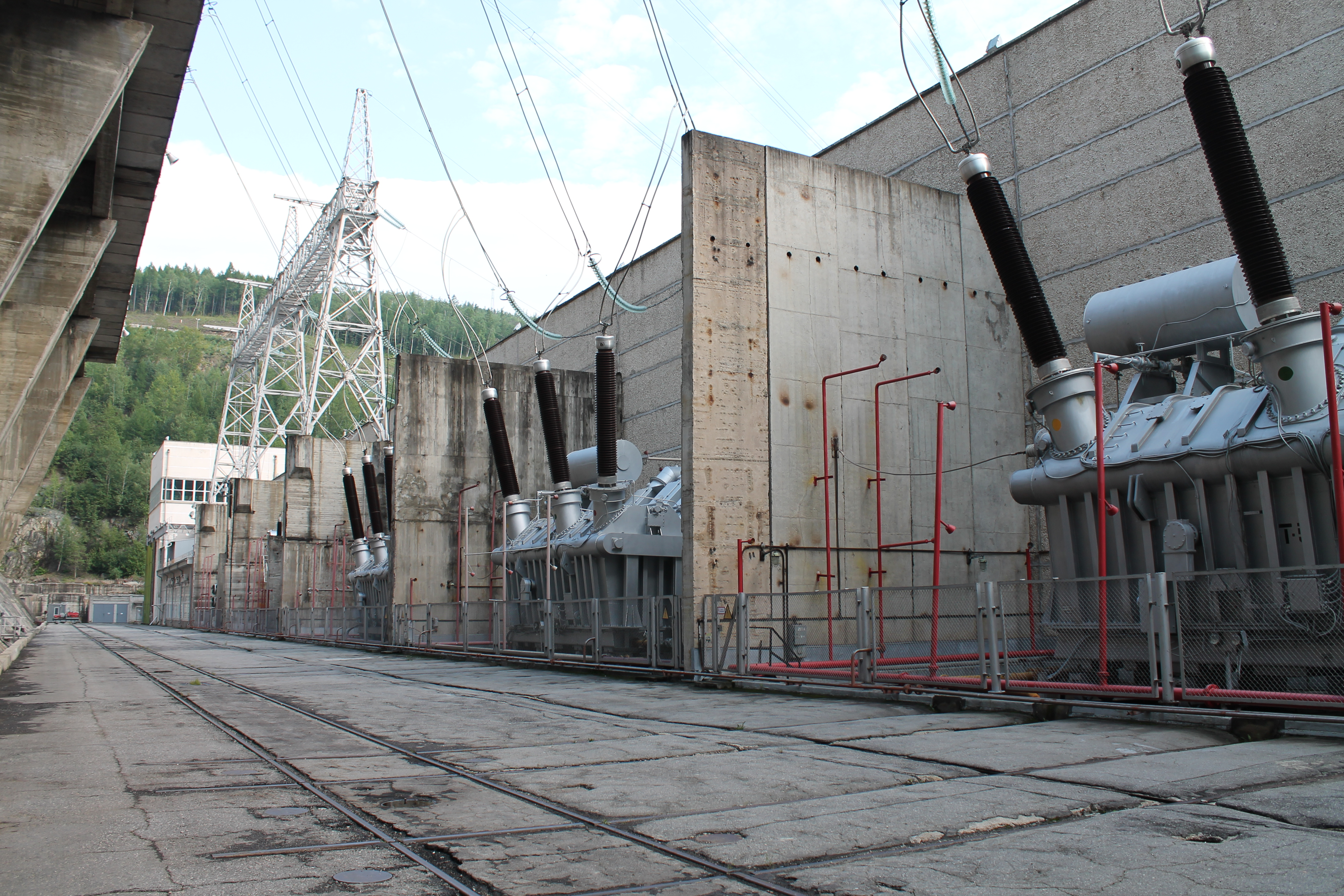
Power transformers

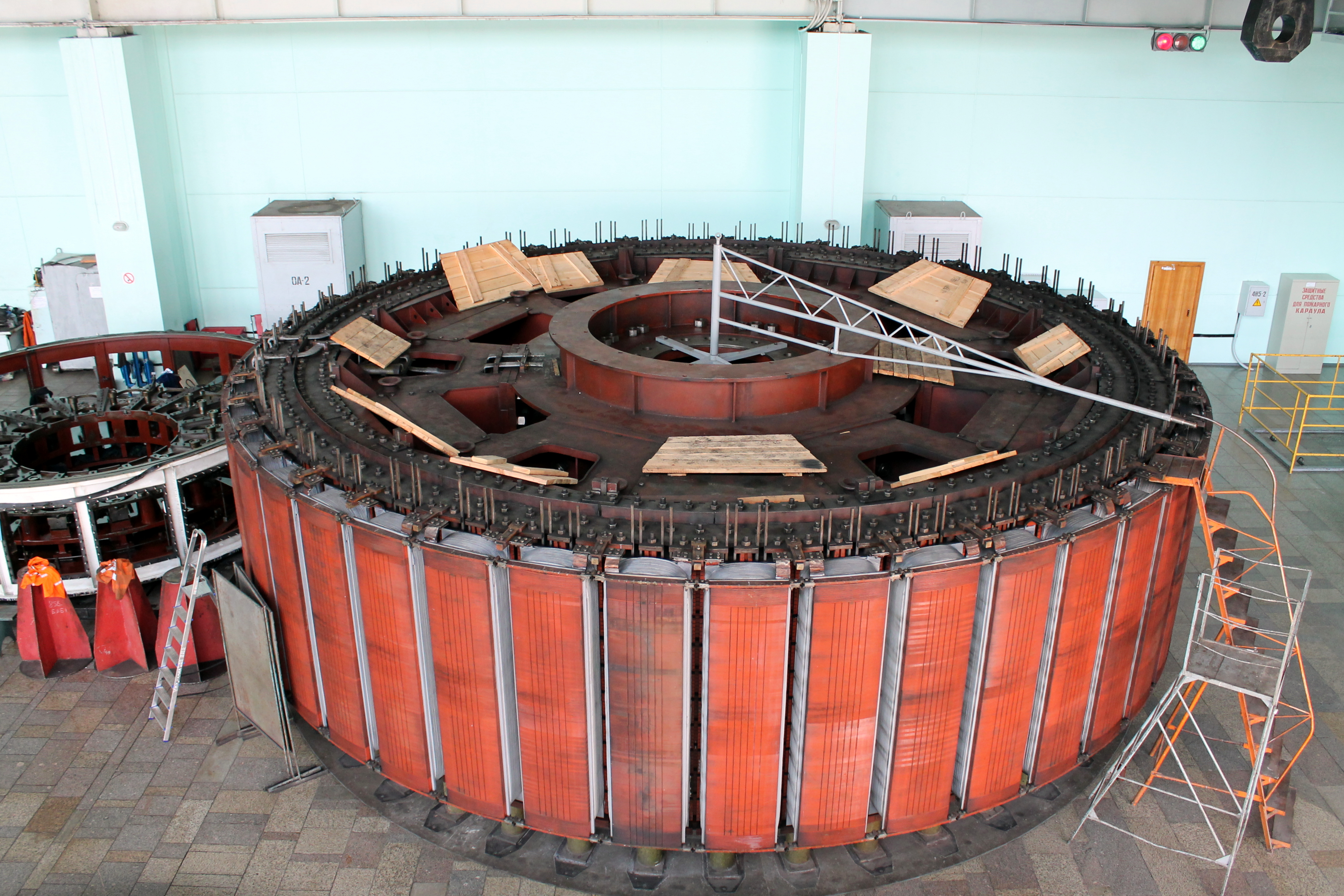
Generator rotor

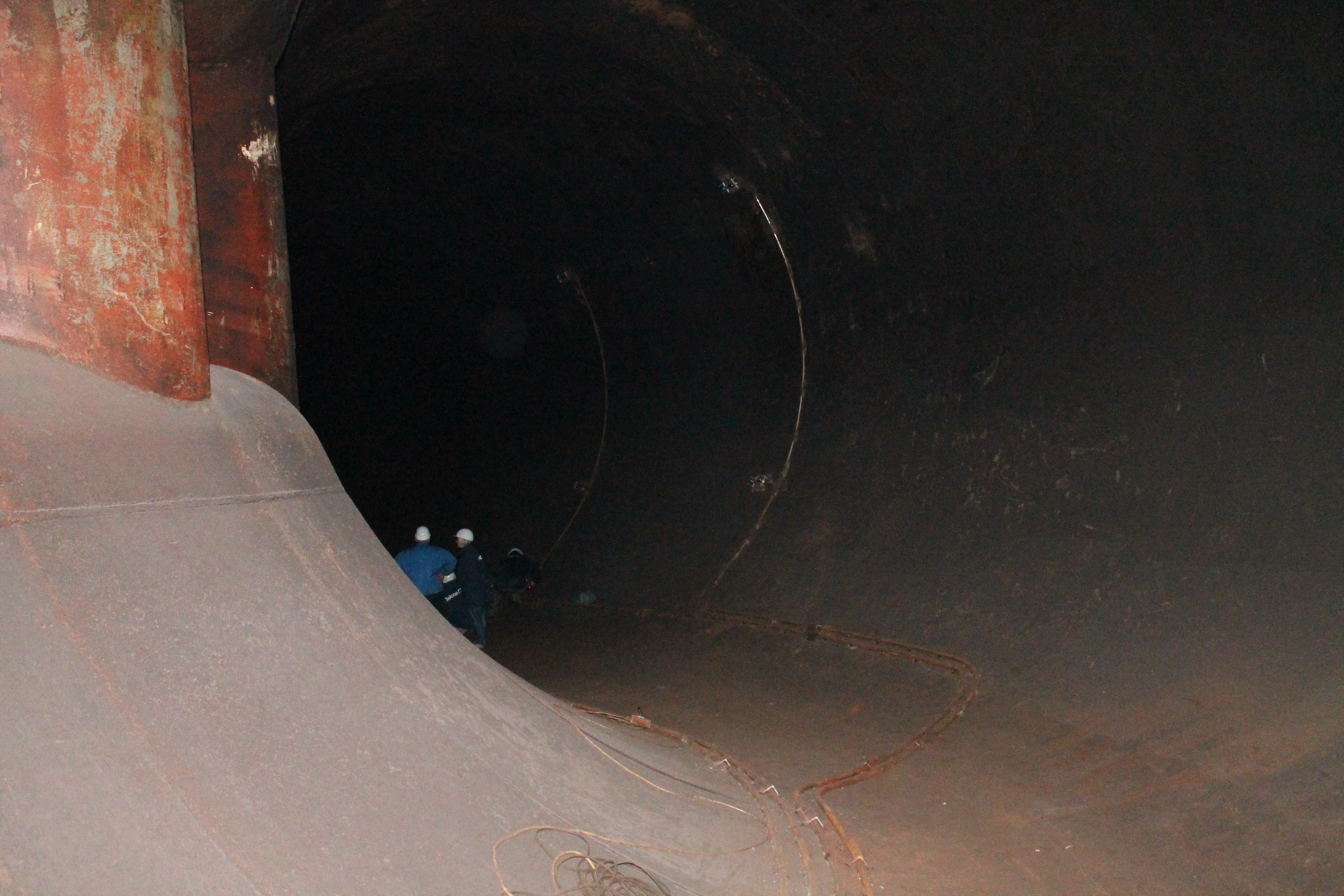
Inside the spiral chamber of the turbine

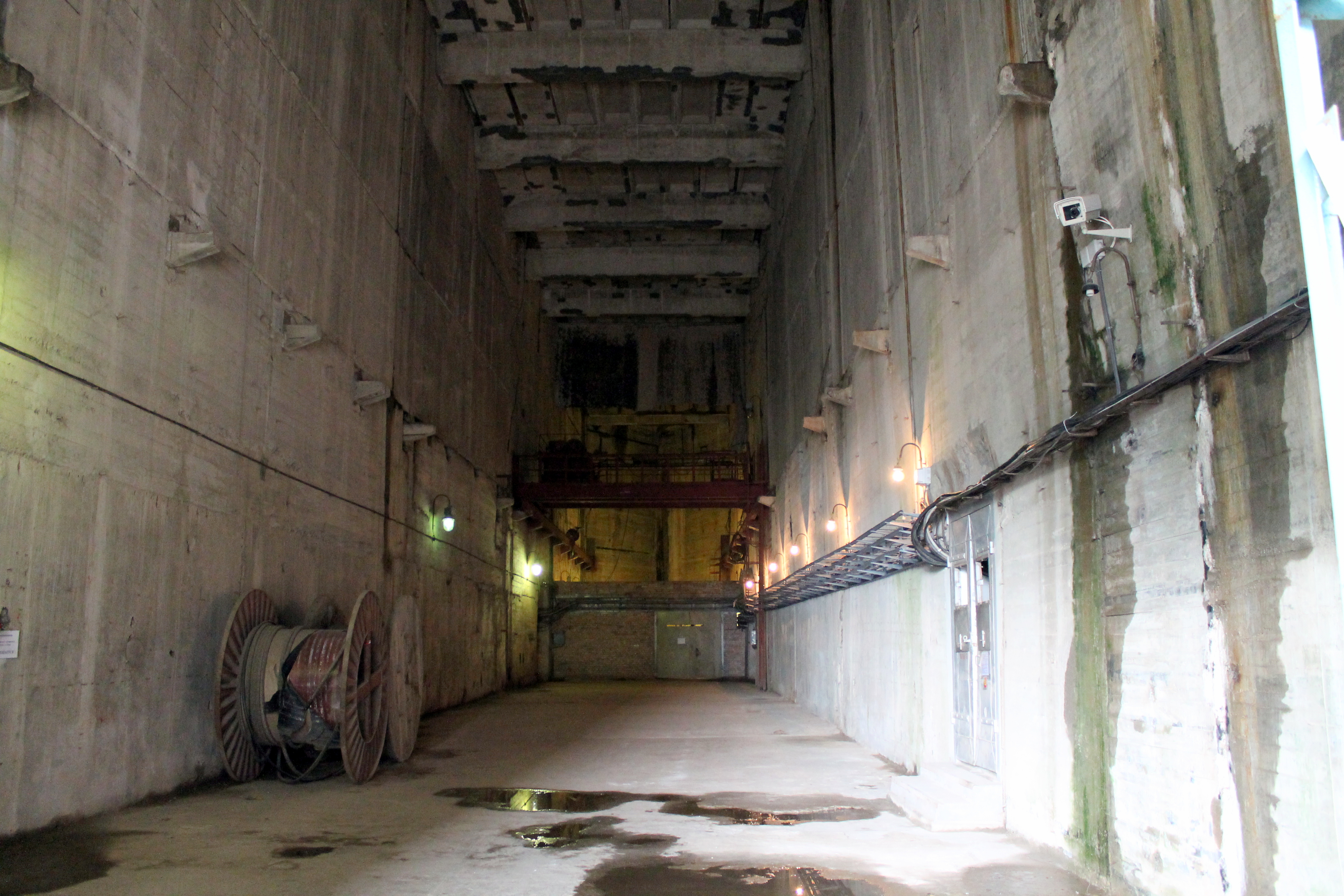
Inside the dam wall

== See also ==
- List of conventional hydroelectric power stations
- List of power stations in Russia
