= Sasnovy Bor =

Sasnovy Bor (Belarusian: Сасновы Бор; Russian: Сосновый Бор, romanized: Sosnovy Bor) may refer to the following places in Belarus:

- Sasnovy Bor, Brest Region, a settlement in Ivatsevichy District, Brest Region
- Sasnovy Bor, Gomel Region, a work settlement in Svyetlahorsk District, Gomel Region
- Sasnovy Bor, Grodno Region, a village in Shchuchyn District, Grodno Region
- Sasnovy Bor, Dzyarzhynsk District, a settlement in Dzyarzhynsk District, Minsk Region
- Sasnovy Bor, Maladzyechna District, a settlement in Maladzyechna District, Minsk Region
- Sasnovy Bor, Vitebsk Region, a village in Rasony District, Vitebsk Region

== See also ==
- Sosnovy Bor
