= Zeya Airport =

Zeya Airport Аэропорт Зея
- IATA: EYA; ICAO: UHBE

Summary
- Airport type: Public
- Serves: Zeya
- Coordinates: 53.688°N 127.091°E
- Website: zeya-airport.ru

Map
- Location of airport in Amur Oblast

Runways
Direction	Length		Surface
Direction	ft	m	Surface
03/21		2,230

Zeya Airport (Russian: Аэропорт Зея) (IATA: EYA, ICAO: UHBE) Airport is a regional airport serving the town of Zeya, in Amur Oblast, Russia. The airport is primarily used for general aviation and is operated by the local area government.

Zeya airport located 12 km southwest of the city of Zeya, on a plateau bounded by the Zeya River in the east, the Gulik River valley in the north, and the Mokhchi River in the south. The airport is a hub for landing sites Gorny, Bomnak, Khvoyny, Beregovoy.

== Airlines and destinations ==
Airlines	Destinations
Aurora	Blagoveshchensk, Khabarovsk

== See also ==
- List of airports in Russia
