= Gorny, Amur Oblast =

Gorny Горный
- Settlement
- Location within Amur Oblast Location within Russia
- Coordinates: 54°38′N 128°25′E
- Country: Russia
- Region: Amur Oblast
- District: Zeysky District
- Time zone: UTC+9:00

Gorny (Russian: Горный) is a rural locality (a settlement) in Gornensky Selsoviet of Zeysky District, Amur Oblast, Russia. The population was 1366 as of 2018. There are 18 streets.

== Geography ==
Gorny is located on the north bank of the Zeya Reservoir, 261 km northeast of Zeya (the district's administrative centre) by road. Verkhnezeysk is the nearest rural locality.

Closest airport is Zeya Airport.
