= Norsk (rural locality) =

Norsk Норск
- Selo
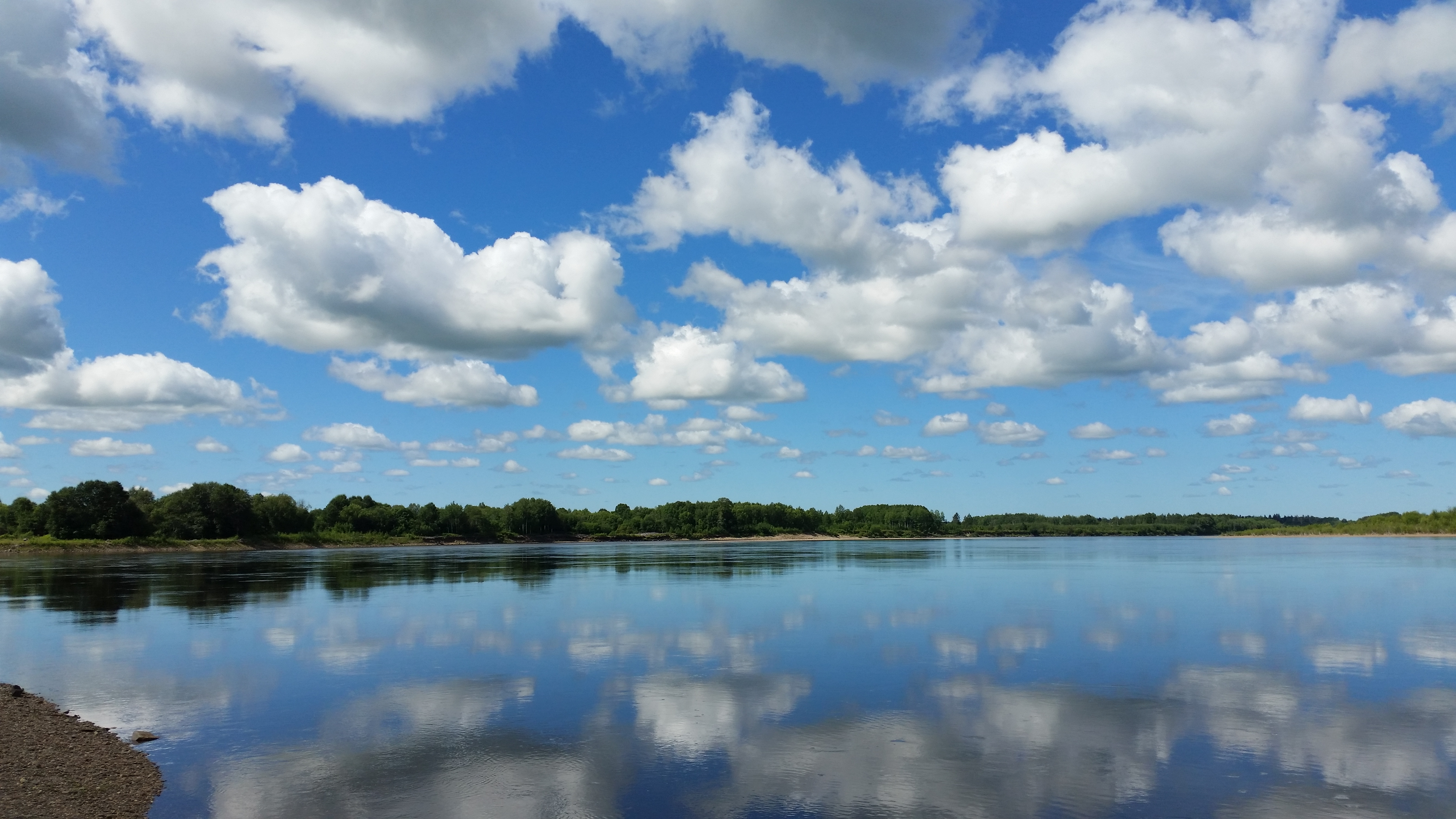
- Landscape of the Selemdzha in Norsk
- Interactive map of Norsk
- Location of Norsk Norsk (Amur Oblast)
- Coordinates: 52°20′N 129°54′E
- Country: Russia
- Federal subject: Amur Oblast
- Administrative district: Selemdzhinsky District
- Founded: 1892

Population
  - Estimate (2018): 291 )
- Time zone: UTC+9 (MSK+6)
- Postal code: 676570
- OKTMO ID: 10645408101

Norsk (Russian: Норск) is a rural locality (a selo) in Selemdzhinsky District of Amur Oblast, Russia.

== Geography ==
Norsk is located on the left bank of the Selemdzha River, 6 kilometres (3.7 mi) downstream from the mouth of the Nora.

== Climate ==
Norsk has a monsoon-influenced humid continental climate (Köppen climate classification Dwb), with dry, bitterly cold winters and warm, humid summers.

Climate data for Norsk
Month	Jan	Feb	Mar	Apr	May	Jun	Jul	Aug	Sep	Oct	Nov	Dec	Year
Record high °C (°F)	−3.0 (26.6)	2.7 (36.9)	15.0 (59.0)	28.7 (83.7)	31.6 (88.9)	34.7 (94.5)	35.3 (95.5)	34.3 (93.7)	29.4 (84.9)	24.6 (76.3)	10.0 (50.0)	0.0 (32.0)	35.3 (95.5)
Mean daily maximum °C (°F)	−19.9 (−3.8)	−12.7 (9.1)	−2.7 (27.1)	8.7 (47.7)	18.1 (64.6)	24.2 (75.6)	26.5 (79.7)	23.9 (75.0)	17.3 (63.1)	6.6 (43.9)	−8.7 (16.3)	−20.3 (−4.5)	5.1 (41.2)
Daily mean °C (°F)	−28.4 (−19.1)	−22.7 (−8.9)	−11.2 (11.8)	2.2 (36.0)	10.9 (51.6)	17.2 (63.0)	20.1 (68.2)	17.5 (63.5)	10.2 (50.4)	0.2 (32.4)	−15.6 (3.9)	−27.5 (−17.5)	−2.3 (27.9)
Mean daily minimum °C (°F)	−34.7 (−30.5)	−31.2 (−24.2)	−20.2 (−4.4)	−4.6 (23.7)	3.5 (38.3)	10.2 (50.4)	14.3 (57.7)	11.8 (53.2)	4.0 (39.2)	−5.4 (22.3)	−21.4 (−6.5)	−33.1 (−27.6)	−8.9 (16.0)
Record low °C (°F)	−52.0 (−61.6)	−49.7 (−57.5)	−41.9 (−43.4)	−28.8 (−19.8)	−7.6 (18.3)	−1.4 (29.5)	2.5 (36.5)	−1.3 (29.7)	−8.9 (16.0)	−24.6 (−12.3)	−45.1 (−49.2)	−50.2 (−58.4)	−52.0 (−61.6)
Average precipitation mm (inches)	6.4 (0.25)	5.7 (0.22)	11.2 (0.44)	21.8 (0.86)	60.2 (2.37)	75.0 (2.95)	125.9 (4.96)	124.4 (4.90)	66.0 (2.60)	33.7 (1.33)	19.0 (0.75)	9.7 (0.38)	559 (22.01)
Average precipitation days (≥ 0.1 mm)	5.7	4.5	5.4	7.6	11.1	12.7	13.6	14.3	12.8	8.5	8.9	8.6	113.7
Average relative humidity (%)	70.4	65.9	60.4	55.5	59.3	67.9	74.6	76.7	71.9	66.1	75.9	74.4	68.3
Mean monthly sunshine hours	163	199	246	232	262	288	273	236	198	178	151	138	2,564
Source 1: Roshydromet (1991-2020)
Source 2: climatebase.ru (precipitation days, humidity and sunshine hours)
