= Sosnovy Bor, Karaidelsky District, Republic of Bashkortostan =

Sosnovy Bor Сосновый Бор
- Village
- Location within Bashkortostan Location within Russia
- Coordinates: 55°49′N 57°06′E
- Country: Russia
- Region: Bashkortostan
- District: Karaidelsky District
- Time zone: UTC+5:00

Sosnovy Bor (Russian: Сосновый Бор) is a rural locality (a village) in Maginsky Selsoviet, Karaidelsky District, Bashkortostan, Russia. The population was 152 as of 2010. There are 6 streets.

== Geography ==
Sosnovy Bor is located 17 km east of Karaidel (the district's administrative centre) by road.
