= Sosnovy Bor, Petushinsky District, Vladimir Oblast =

Sosnovy Bor Сосновый Бор
- Settlement
- Location within Vladimir Oblast Location within Russia
- Coordinates: 55°56′N 39°04′E
- Country: Russia
- Region: Vladimir Oblast
- District: Petushinsky District
- Time zone: UTC+3:00

Sosnovy Bor (Russian: Сосновый Бор) is a rural locality (a settlement) in Nagornoye Rural Settlement, Petushinsky District, Vladimir Oblast, Russia. The population was 179 as of 2010. There are 2 streets.

== Geography ==
Sosnovy Bor is located on the Sheredar River, 36 km west of Petushki (the district's administrative centre) by road. Gostets is the nearest rural locality.
