= Khvoyny, Zabaykalsky Krai =

Khvoyny Хвойный
- Settlement
- Location within Zabaykalsky Krai Location within Russia
- Coordinates: 51°40′N 112°59′E
- Country: Russia
- Region: Zabaykalsky Krai
- District: Chitinsky District
- Time zone: UTC+9:00

Khvoyny (Russian: Хвойный) is a rural locality (a settlement) in Chitinsky District, Zabaykalsky Krai, Russia. Population: 27 (2021 census); 32 (2010 census); There are 6 streets in this settlement.

== Geography ==
This rural locality is located 53 km from Chita (the district's administrative centre and capital of Zabaykalsky Krai) and 5,216 km from Moscow. Kuka is the nearest rural locality.
