= Sosnovy Bor, Belebeyevsky District, Republic of Bashkortostan =

Sosnovy Bor Сосновый Бор
- Village
- Location within Bashkortostan Location within Russia
- Coordinates: 54°13′N 54°19′E
- Country: Russia
- Region: Bashkortostan
- District: Belebeyevsky District
- Time zone: UTC+5:00

Sosnovy Bor (Russian: Сосновый Бор) is a rural locality (a village) in Usen-Ivanovsky Selsoviet, Belebeyevsky District, Bashkortostan, Russia. The population was 90 as of 2010. There are 3 streets.

== Geography ==
Sosnovy Bor is located 26 km northeast of Belebey (the district's administrative centre) by road. Krasnaya Zarya is the nearest rural locality.
