= Sosnovy Bor, Birsky District, Republic of Bashkortostan =

Sosnovy Bor Сосновый Бор
- Village
- Location within Bashkortostan Location within Russia
- Coordinates: 55°16′N 55°31′E
- Country: Russia
- Region: Bashkortostan
- District: Birsky District
- Time zone: UTC+5:00

Sosnovy Bor (Russian: Сосновый Бор) is a rural locality (a village) in Staropetrovsky Selsoviet, Birsky District, Bashkortostan, Russia. The population was 65 as of 2010. There is 1 street.

== Geography ==
Sosnovy Bor is located 19 km south of Birsk (the district's administrative centre) by road. Staropetrovo is the nearest rural locality.
