= Sosnovy Bor, Yuryev-Polsky District, Vladimir Oblast =

Sosnovy Bor Сосновый Бор
- Selo
- Location within Vladimir Oblast Location within Russia
- Coordinates: 56°26′N 39°39′E
- Country: Russia
- Region: Vladimir Oblast
- District: Yuryev-Polsky District
- Time zone: UTC+3:00

Sosnovy Bor (Russian: Сосновый Бор) is a rural locality (a selo) in Krasnoselskoye Rural Settlement, Yuryev-Polsky District, Vladimir Oblast, Russia. The population was 560 as of 2010. There are 7 streets.

== Geography ==
Sosnovy Bor is located 8 km south of Yuryev-Polsky (the district's administrative centre) by road. Kolokoltsevo is the nearest rural locality.
