= Nora (Russia) =

Nora Нора
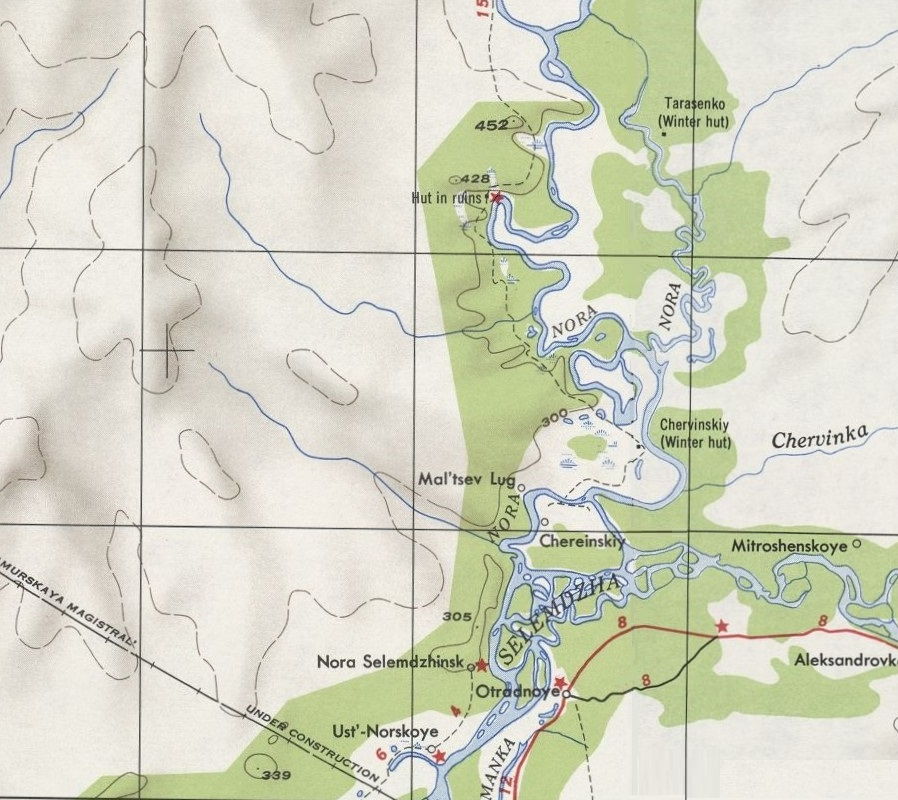
- Confluence of the Nora and the Selemdzha map section

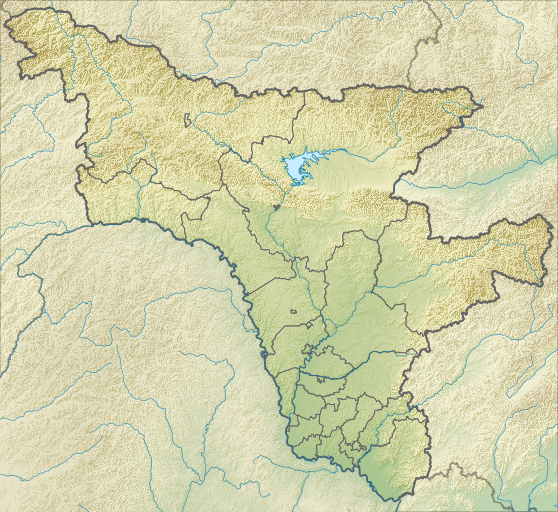
- Mouth location in Amur Oblast, Russia

Location
- Country: Russia

Physical characteristics
- Source
  - location: Dzhagdy Range
  - coordinates: 53°48′03″N 131°04′21″E
- Mouth: Selemdzha
  - location: near Norsk
  - coordinates: 52°25′20″N 129°56′20″E
- Length: 305 km (190 mi)
- Basin size: 16,700 km^{2} (6,400 sq mi)
- Discharge
  - average: 130 m^{3}/s (4,600 cu ft/s)

Basin features
- Progression: Selemdzha → Zeya→ Amur→ Sea of Okhotsk

The Nora (Russian: Нора) is a river in Amur Oblast, Russia. It is the 2nd longest tributary of the Selemdzha after the Ulma, with a length of 305 kilometres (190 mi) and the first in drainage basin area, with 16,700 square kilometres (6,400 mi^{2}). The name originated in "nehru", the Evenki word for "grayling".

The river flows across a desolate, uninhabited area. The Lower Nora Zakaznik (Нижне-Норский заказник) is a protected area for the Siberian roe deer that was established in 2010 in the lower basin of the river.

== Course ==
The Nora is a right tributary of the Selemdzha. It has its origin in the southern slopes of the Dzhagdy Range. In its upper reaches the Nora flows fast among pebbles and boulders in a roughly SW direction across the Amur-Zeya Plateau. Then in its lower course it bends southwards entering a floodplain and flowing among a very marshy area dotted with lakes. Finally it meets the Selemdzha upstream from the mouth of the Orlovka (Mamyn), 6 kilometres (3.7 mi) from the village of Norsk, Selemdzhinsky District.

Owing to the proximity of mountain ranges the Nora river basin is affected by heavy snowfall in the winter. The climate is harsh, with severe frosts in January, where the temperature may sink to −52 °C (−62 °F). There is thick permafrost in the basin. The river freezes in late October and stays under ice until early May. Summers are humid and warm, with temperatures reaching 34 °C (93 °F) in July.

The main tributaries of the Nora are the Dugda, the longest one, from the right, and the Meun (Mevon) and Egor from the left.

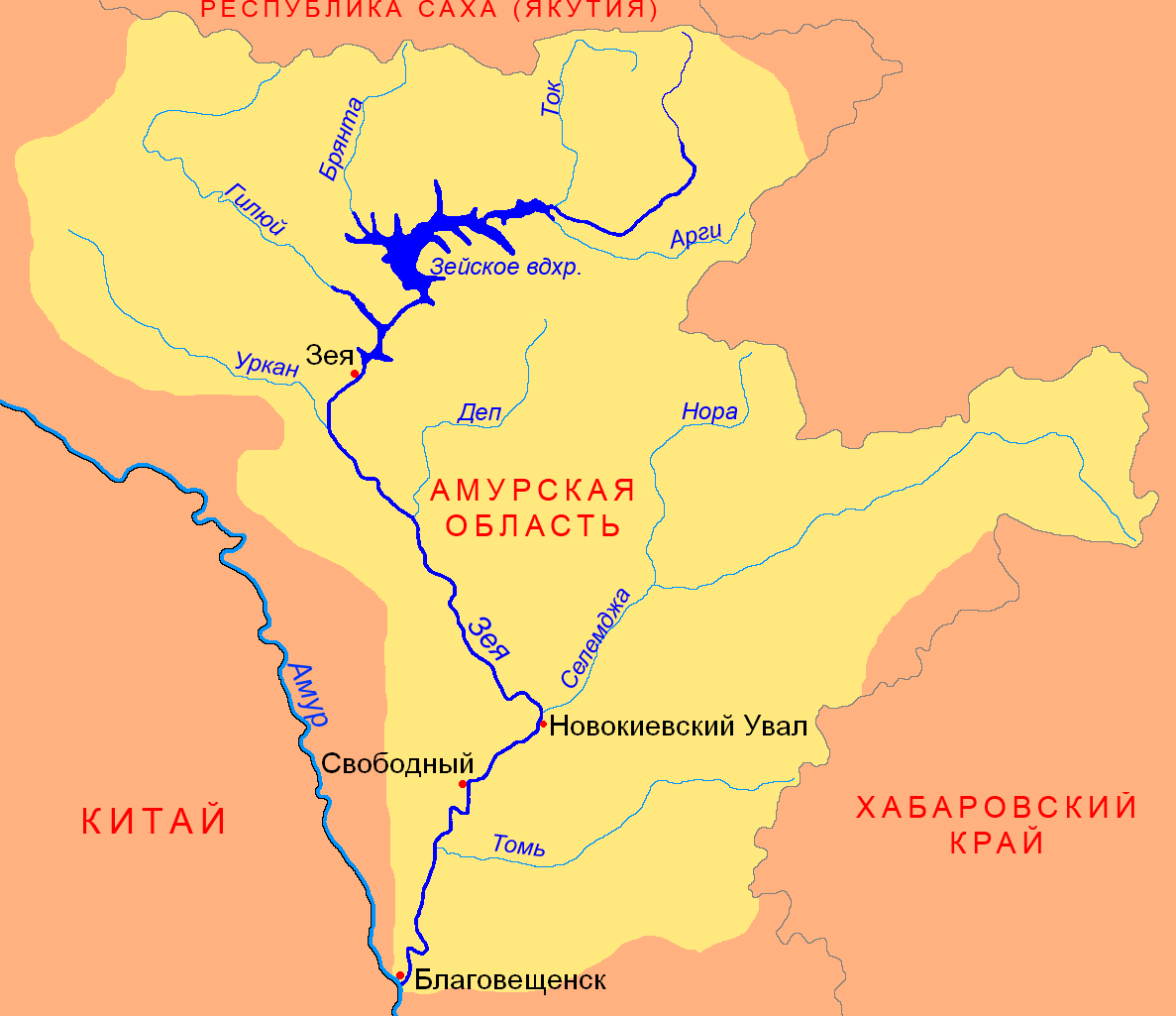
Basin of the Zeya

== Fauna ==
Besides the grayling that gives its name to the river, Amur pike, Amur ide, lenok, taimen and silver carp are among the common fish species in the waters of the Nora river.

== See also ==
- List of rivers of Russia
