= Greater Khingan =

Mountain range in China, and Mongolia

Greater Khingan Range
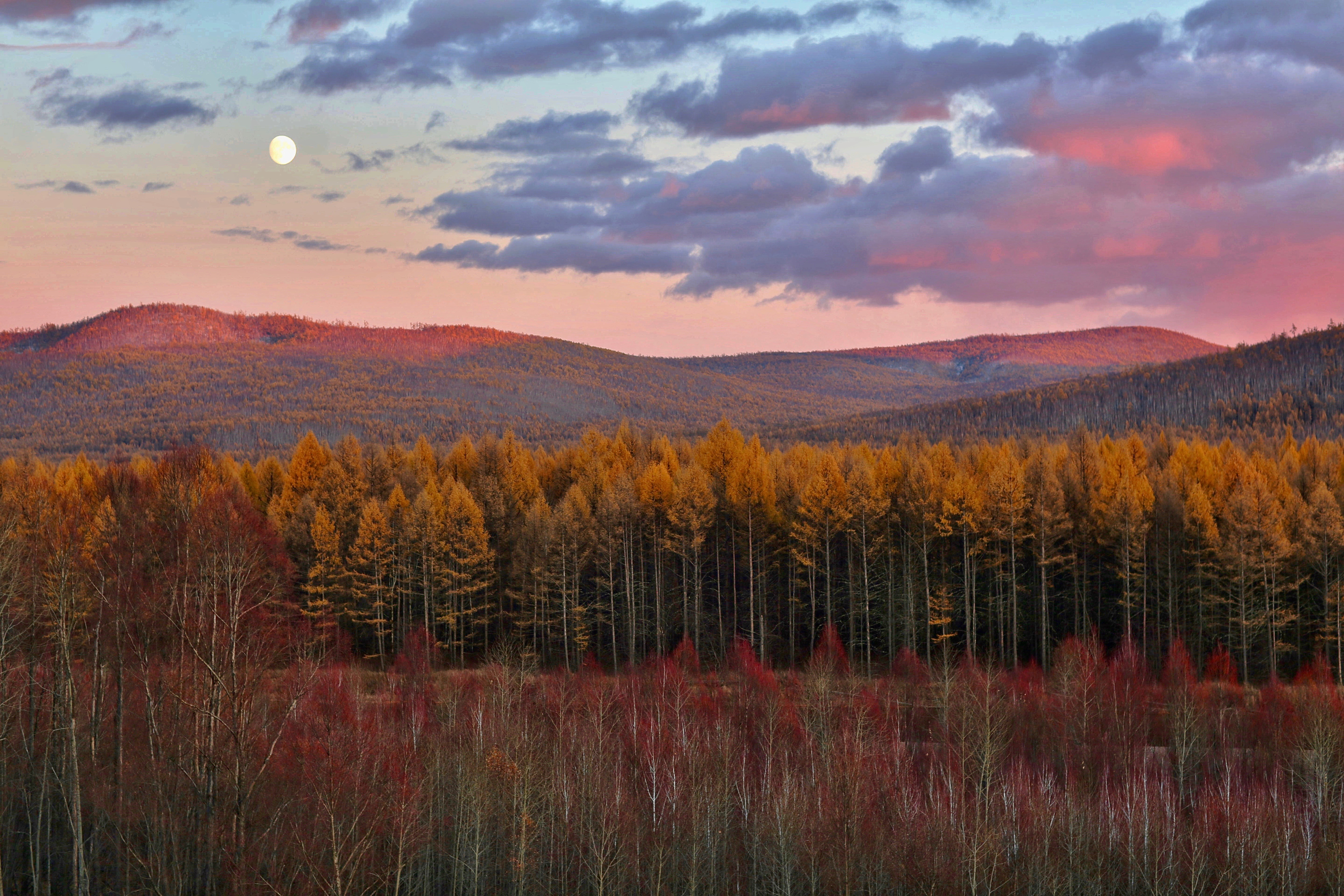
- Forest in Genhe, Inner Mongolia

Highest point
- Elevation: 2,035 m (6,677 ft)
- Coordinates: 49°22′57″N 123°09′24″E

Naming
- Native name: 大兴安岭 (Chinese)

Geography
- Location within China
- Location: Located in Manchuria

Geology
- Mountain type: Tilted block faulting

The Greater Khingan Range or Da Hinggan Range (simplified Chinese: 大兴安岭; traditional Chinese: 大興安嶺; pinyin: Dà Xīng'ān Lǐng; IPA: [tâ ɕíŋ.án.lìŋ]; Old Turkic: 𐰴𐰑𐰺𐰴𐰣:𐰖𐰃𐱁, romanized: Qadïrqan Yïš) is a 1,200-kilometer-long (750 mi) volcanic mountain range in the Inner Mongolia region of Northeast China, and in easternmost part of Mongolia. It was originally called the Xianbei Mountains, which later became the name of the northern branch of the Donghu, the Xianbei.

== Geography ==
The range extends 1,200 kilometers (750 mi) from north to south. It is the watershed between the Nen and Songhua river systems to the east, and the Amur and its tributaries to the northwest. Cassiterite, a tin ore mined in the range was transported over 1,500 km to the south during the Middle Shang period for bronze production.

== Population ==
Its slopes are a relatively rich grazing area. The Khitan people lived on the eastern slopes before establishing the Liao dynasty in the tenth century. Oroqen, a Tungusic people, live along the Greater and Lesser Khingan range in northeastern China and belong to the oldest autochthonous populations of the region. On the western slopes lived the nomadic people, who raised sheep and camels and used the Mongolian Plateau for their pastoralist economy.

== In fiction ==
The Greater Khingan Range is a key setting in the science fiction novel The Three-Body Problem by Chinese author Liu Cixin.

== See also ==
- Daxing'anling Prefecture
- Lesser Khingan
- Xing'an
- Da Hinggan-Dzhagdy Mountains conifer forests
- 1987 Black Dragon fire, wildfire in China
