= Zeya, Russia =

Town in Amur Oblast, Russia

Zeya Зея
- Town
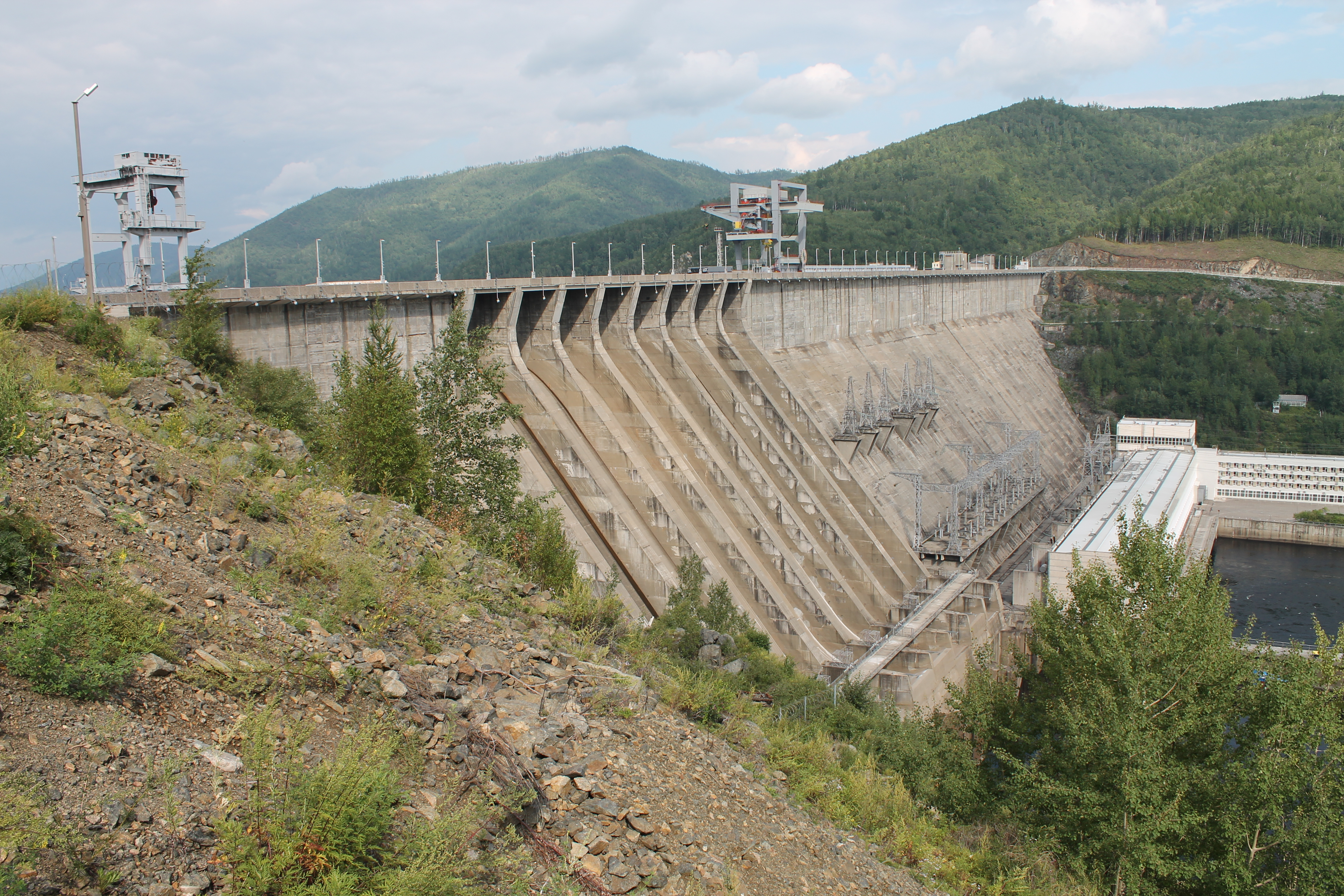
- Zeya Dam and Hydroelectric Power Plant

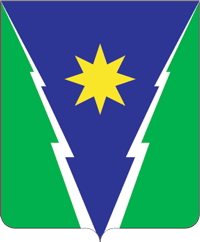
- Flag Coat of arms
- Interactive map of Zeya
- Location of Zeya Zeya (Amur Oblast)
- Coordinates: 53°44′N 127°15′E
- Country: Russia
- Federal subject: Amur Oblast
- Founded: 1879
- Town status since: 1906

Area
  - Total: 45 km^{2} (17 sq mi)
- Elevation: 220 m (720 ft)

Population (2010 Census)
  - Total: 24,986
  - Estimate (2023): 18,864 (−24.5%)
  - Density: 560/km^{2} (1,400/sq mi)

Administrative status
  - Subordinated to: Zeya Urban Okrug
  - Capital of: Zeya Urban Okrug, Zeysky District

Municipal status
  - Urban okrug: Zeya Urban Okrug
  - Capital of: Zeya Urban Okrug, Zeysky Municipal District
- Time zone: UTC+9 (MSK+6)
- Postal code: 676246
- Dialing code: +7 41658
- OKTMO ID: 10712000001
- Website: www.admzeya.ru

Zeya (Russian: Зе́я) is a town in Amur Oblast, Russia, located on the Zeya River (a tributary of the Amur) 230 kilometers (140 mi) southeast of Tynda and 532 kilometers (331 mi) north of Blagoveshchensk.

== History ==
It was founded in 1879 as the settlement of Zeysky Sklad (Зе́йский Склад, lit. Zeya warehouse), as a supply and administrative center for the exploitation of newly discovered gold deposits in the Zeya River basin. By 1906, the settlement had grown to over 5,000 inhabitants, and was granted town status under the name Zeya-Pristan (Зе́я-При́стань, lit Zeya Port). In 1913, the town's name was shortened to Zeya.

The town remained one of Russia's most important centers of gold production until the opening of the Kolyma region in the 1930s.

Construction of the Zeya Dam, beginning in 1964, saw a new growth period for the town.

== Administrative and municipal status ==
Within the framework of administrative divisions, Zeya serves as the administrative center of Zeysky District, even though it is not a part of it. As an administrative division, it is incorporated separately as Zeya Urban Okrug—an administrative unit with the status equal to that of the districts. As a municipal division, this administrative unit also has urban okrug status.

== Economy ==
The Zeya Dam is the main economic focus for the town, with forestry, gold mining and agriculture also conducted in the area.

=== Transportation ===
Town is served by Zeya Airport.

== Geography ==
Basin of the Amur

The town is located on the Zeya River (a tributary of the Amur) 230 kilometers (140 mi) southeast of Tynda and 532 kilometers (331 mi) north of Blagoveshchensk.

=== Climate ===
Zeya experiences a monsoon influenced humid continental climate (Köppen climate classification Dwb) with frigid, dry winters and short, warm summers.

Climate data for Zeya
Month	Jan	Feb	Mar	Apr	May	Jun	Jul	Aug	Sep	Oct	Nov	Dec	Year
Record high °C (°F)	0.0 (32.0)	7.2 (45.0)	13.9 (57.0)	25.3 (77.5)	34.0 (93.2)	34.7 (94.5)	40.0 (104.0)	35.5 (95.9)	28.1 (82.6)	21.0 (69.8)	6.2 (43.2)	0.0 (32.0)	40.0 (104.0)
Mean daily maximum °C (°F)	−19.5 (−3.1)	−11.7 (10.9)	−2.9 (26.8)	7.8 (46.0)	17.1 (62.8)	24.1 (75.4)	26.1 (79.0)	23.3 (73.9)	16.0 (60.8)	5.2 (41.4)	−9.7 (14.5)	−18.7 (−1.7)	4.8 (40.6)
Daily mean °C (°F)	−24.2 (−11.6)	−18.4 (−1.1)	−8.8 (16.2)	2.3 (36.1)	10.6 (51.1)	17.5 (63.5)	20.4 (68.7)	17.5 (63.5)	10.2 (50.4)	−0.4 (31.3)	−14.5 (5.9)	−23.4 (−10.1)	−0.9 (30.4)
Mean daily minimum °C (°F)	−29.7 (−21.5)	−25.1 (−13.2)	−17.1 (1.2)	−4.4 (24.1)	3.0 (37.4)	10.4 (50.7)	14.0 (57.2)	10.9 (51.6)	3.2 (37.8)	−6.9 (19.6)	−20.9 (−5.6)	−28.2 (−18.8)	−7.6 (18.3)
Record low °C (°F)	−47.8 (−54.0)	−46.1 (−51.0)	−38.9 (−38.0)	−25 (−13)	−8.6 (16.5)	−3.9 (25.0)	0.0 (32.0)	−1.5 (29.3)	−10 (14)	−30 (−22)	−42.2 (−44.0)	−48.9 (−56.0)	−48.9 (−56.0)
Average precipitation mm (inches)	4.6 (0.18)	7.5 (0.30)	8.8 (0.35)	23.0 (0.91)	42.9 (1.69)	95.4 (3.76)	123.1 (4.85)	114.5 (4.51)	73.0 (2.87)	19.6 (0.77)	10.3 (0.41)	6.3 (0.25)	529 (20.85)
Source 1: climatebase.ru
Source 2: http://www.retscreen.net/ru/home.php NASA RETScreen Database

== Sister cities ==
- Baker City, Oregon, United States
