= Zeysky District =

Zeysky District Зейский район (Russian)
- District
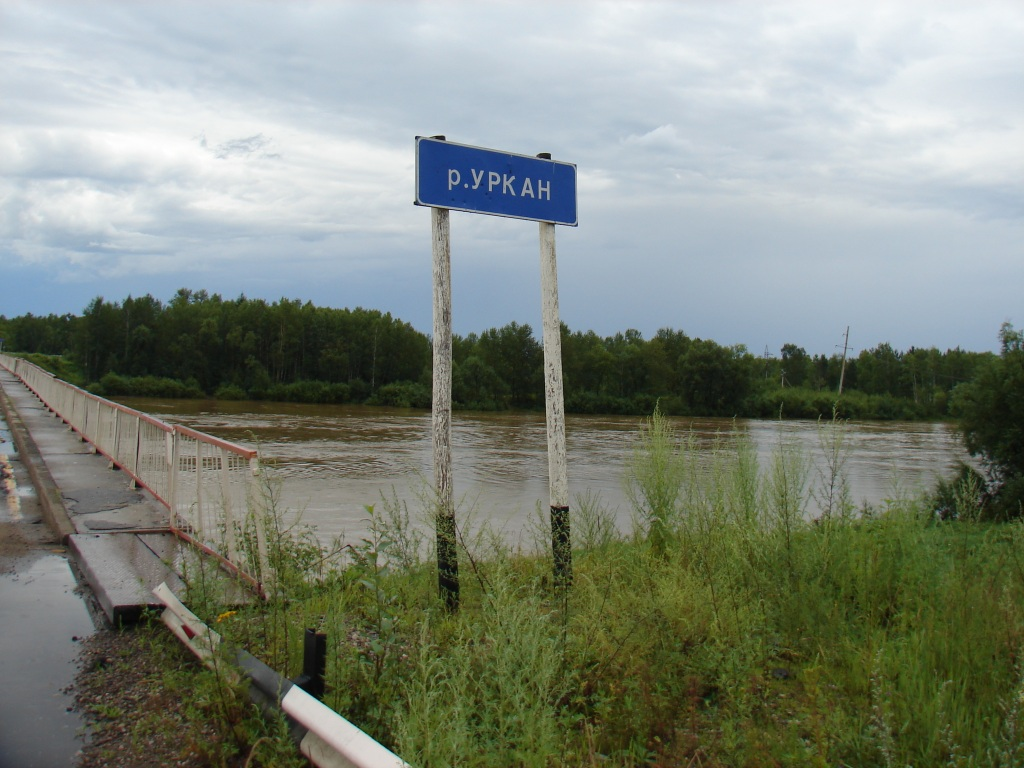
- Urkan River in Zeysky District

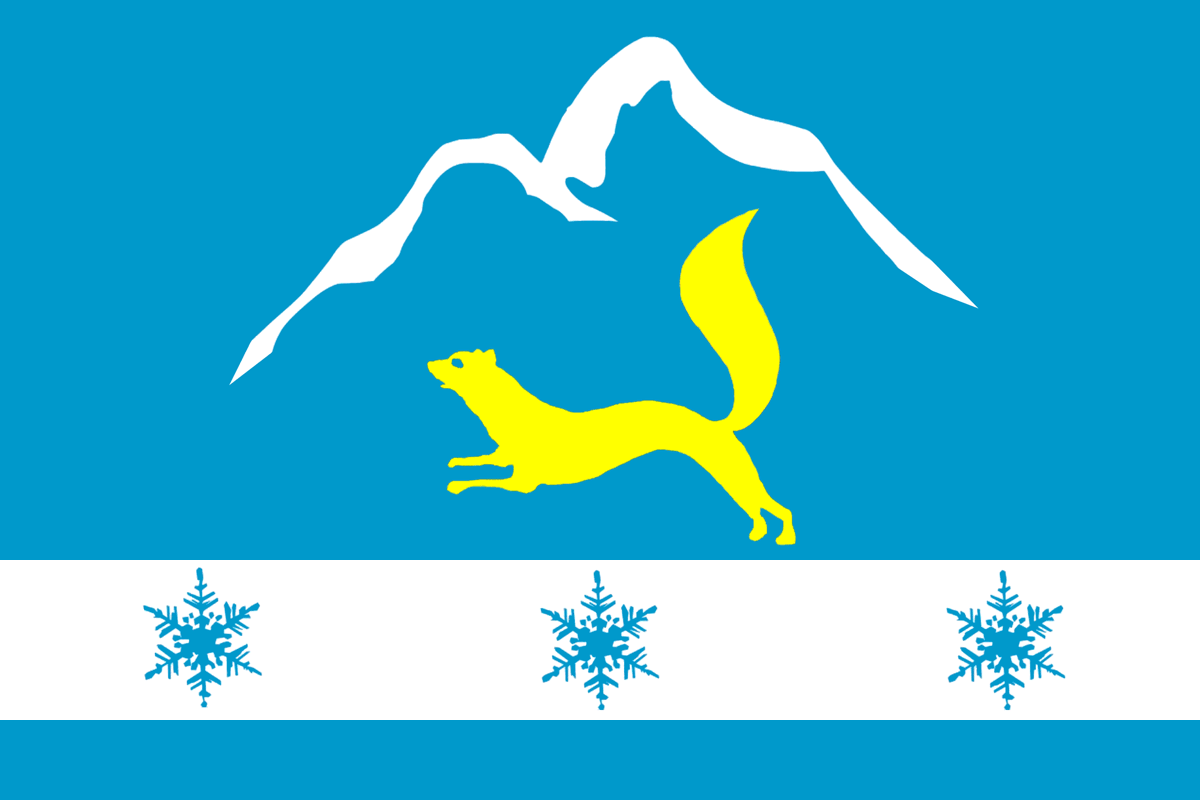
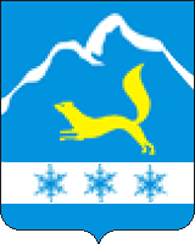
- Flag Coat of arms
- Location of Zeysky District in Amur Oblast
- Coordinates: 54°30′N 128°30′E
- Country: Russia
- Federal subject: Amur Oblast
- Established: 1926
- Administrative center: Zeya

Area
  - Total: 87,486 km^{2} (33,779 sq mi)

Population (2010 Census)
  - Total: 16,847
  - Density: 0.19257/km^{2} (0.49875/sq mi)
  - Urban: 0%
  - Rural: 100%

Administrative structure
  - Administrative divisions: 21 Rural settlements
  - Inhabited localities: 31 rural localities

Municipal structure
  - Municipally incorporated as: Zeysky Municipal District
  - Municipal divisions: 0 urban settlements, 21 rural settlements
- Time zone: UTC+9 (MSK+6)
- OKTMO ID: 10625000

Zeysky District (Russian: Зе́йский райо́н) is an administrative and municipal district (raion), one of the twenty in Amur Oblast, Russia. The area of the district is 87,486 square kilometers (33,779 sq mi). Its administrative center is the town of Zeya (which is not administratively a part of the district). Population: 16,847 (2010 census); 20,827 (2002 Census); 42,298 (1989 Soviet census).

== Administrative and municipal status ==
Within the framework of administrative divisions, Zeysky District is one of the twenty in the oblast. The town of Zeya serves as its administrative center, despite being incorporated separately as an urban okrug—an administrative unit with the status equal to that of the districts.

As a municipal division, the district is incorporated as Zeysky Municipal District. Zeya Urban Okrug is incorporated separately from the district.
