= Tomsk constituency =

Tomsk single-member constituency
- Constituency of the Russian State Duma
- Deputy: Ilya Leontyev; United Russia
- Federal subject: Tomsk Oblast
- Districts: Alexandrovsky, Asinovsky, Bakcharsky, Chainsky, Kargasoksky, Kedrovy, Kolpashevsky, Kozhevnikovsky, Krivosheinsky, Molchanovsky, Parabelsky, Pervomaysky, Seversk, Shegarsky, Strezhevoy, Teguldetsky, Tomsk, Tomsky, Verkhneketsky, Zyryansky
- Voters: 744,955 (2026)

The Tomsk constituency (No.180 (Note: Tomsk Urban constituency No.173 in 1993-1995, No.174 in 1995-2007, No.181 in 2016–2026)) is a Russian legislative constituency in Tomsk Oblast. The constituency covers the entirety of Tomsk Oblast.

The constituency has been represented since 2026 by United Russia deputy Ilya Leontyev, former Member of Tomsk Duma, agricultural executive and 2021 runner-up for this seat. Prior three-term Liberal Democratic Aleksey Didenko retired, while two-term United Russia incumbent Tatyana Solomatina, who was redistricted from the eliminated Ob constituency, lost the primary.

== Boundaries ==
1993–1995 Tomsk Urban constituency: Tomsk, Tomsky District
The constituency covered all of the oblast capital Tomsk and its suburbs.

1995–2007: Alexandrovsky District, Asinovsky District, Bakcharsky District, Chainsky District, Kargasoksky District, Kedrovsky District, Kolpashevsky District, Kozhevnikovsky District, Krivosheinsky District, Molchanovsky District, Parabelsky District, Pervomaysky District, Seversk, Shegarsky District, Strezhevoy, Teguldetsky District, Tomsk, Tomsky District, Verkhneketsky District, Zyryansky District
After the 1995 redistricting Tomsk Oblast lost one of its two constituencies, so both Tomsk Urban and Tomsk Rural constituencies were merged into a single constituency, covering the entirety of Tomsk Oblast.

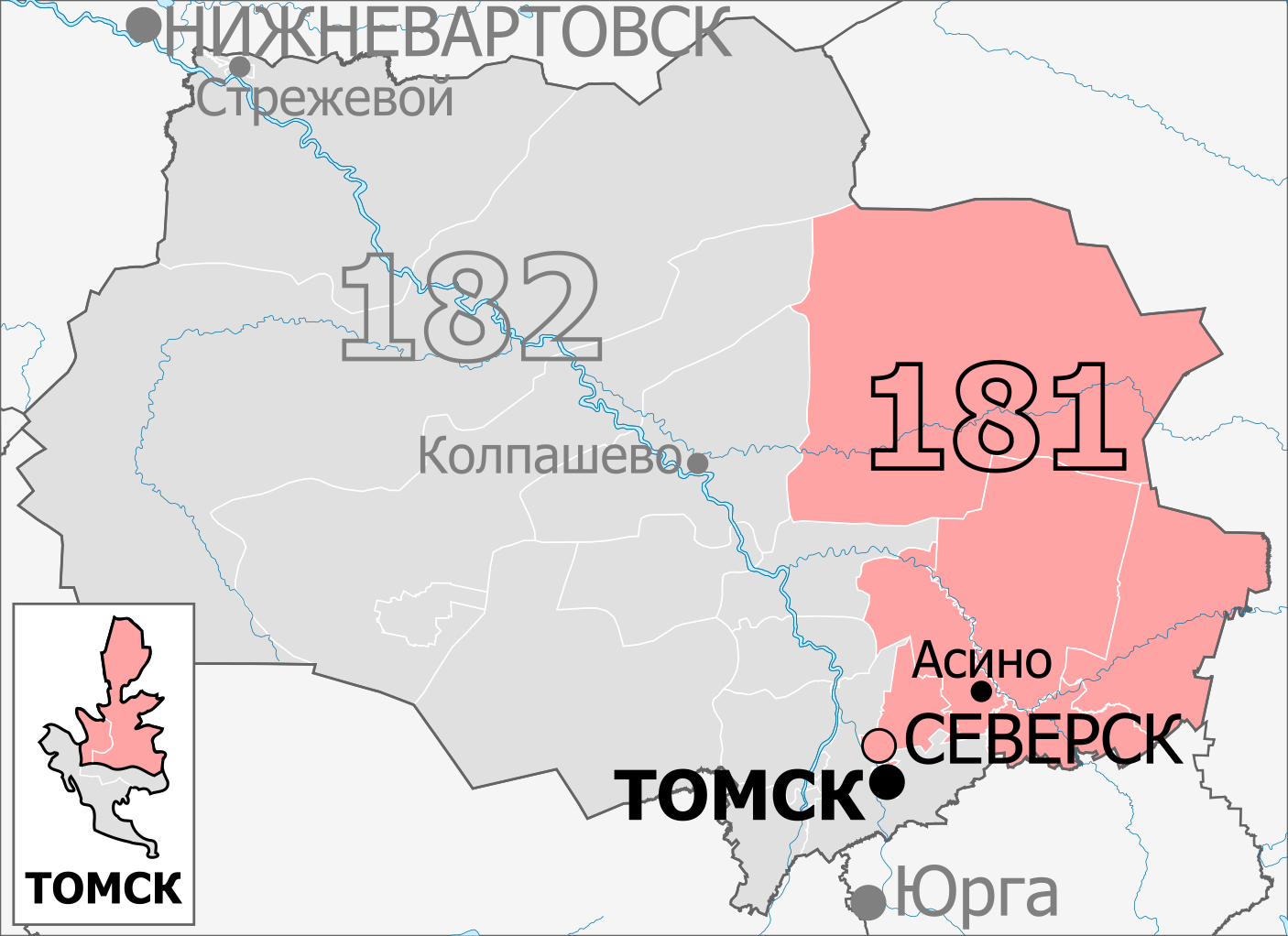
Constituency boundaries from 2016 to 2026

2016–2026: Asinovsky District, Pervomaysky District, Seversk, Teguldetsky District, Tomsk, Tomsky District, Verkhneketsky District, Zyryansky District
The constituency was re-created for the 2016 election. Tomsk Oblast re-gained a second district, so new Tomsk constituency took northern half of Tomsk, nuclear research closed city Seversk and eastern Tomsk Oblast.

2026–present: Alexandrovsky District, Asinovsky District, Bakcharsky District, Chainsky District, Kargasoksky District, Kedrovy, Kolpashevsky District, Kozhevnikovsky District, Krivosheinsky District, Molchanovsky District, Parabelsky District, Pervomaysky District, Seversk, Shegarsky District, Strezhevoy, Teguldetsky District, Tomsk, Tomsky District, Verkhneketsky District, Zyryansky District
After the 2025 redistricting Tomsk Oblast again lost one of its two constituencies, so both Tomsk and Ob constituencies were merged into a single constituency, covering the entirety of Tomsk Oblast.

== Members elected ==
Election	Member	Party
1993	Vladimir Bauer	Choice of Russia
1995	Stepan Sulakshin	Independent
1999	Yegor Ligachyov	Independent
2003	Vladimir Zhidkikh (Note: appointed to the Federation Council in May 2007)	United Russia
2007	Proportional representation - no election by constituency	
2011	Proportional representation - no election by constituency	
2016	Aleksey Didenko	Liberal Democratic Party
2021	Aleksey Didenko	Liberal Democratic Party
2026	Ilya Leontyev	United Russia

== Election results ==
=== 1993 ===
Summary of the 12 December 1993 Russian legislative election in the Tomsk Urban constituency
Candidate	Party	Votes	%
Vladimir Bauer	Choice of Russia	35,737	24.32%
Sergey Ilyin	Independent	20,004	13.61%
Andrey Vedernikov	Independent	19,665	13.38%
Boris Yachmenev	Independent	18,661	12.70%
Irina Vakhrusheva	Independent	16,292	11.09%
Vladimir Tirsky	Independent	4,582	3.12%
against all		32,009	21.78%
Total		146,950	100%

=== 1995 ===
Summary of the 17 December 1995 Russian legislative election in the Tomsk constituency
Candidate	Party	Votes	%
Stepan Sulakshin (incumbent) (Note: redistricted from Tomsk Rural constituency)	Independent	100,202	21.47%
Aleksandr Pomorov	Communist Party	74,320	15.92%
Sergey Zhvachkin	Independent	68,420	14.66%
Yury Galvas	Congress of Russian Communities	41,526	8.90%
Vladimir Bauer (incumbent) (Note: redistricted from Tomsk Urban constituency)	Ivan Rybkin Bloc	36,156	7.75%
Boris Shaydullin	Yabloko	19,471	4.17%
Lyubov Babich	My Fatherland	16,017	3.43%
Andrey Vedernikov	Independent	15,972	3.42%
Valery Lukashov	Liberal Democratic Party	14,575	3.12%
Viktor Kovalevsky	Independent	14,161	3.03%
Aleksey Troshin	Trade Unions and Industrialists – Union of Labour	8,539	1.83%
Aleksandr Karakulov	Communists and Working Russia - for the Soviet Union	7,167	1.54%
Viktor Arkashev	Independent	4,846	1.04%
Viktor Pastukhov	Independent	2,480	0.53%
Nikolay Tishkov	Independent	1,756	0.38%
against all		26,517	5.68%
Total		466,787	100%

=== 1999 ===
Results by district: Yegor Ligachyov: 20–30%; Gennady Khandorin: 20–30% 60–70%; Stepan Sulakshin: 20–30% 30–40%; Oleg Pletnev: 20–30%

Summary of the 19 December 1999 Russian legislative election in the Tomsk constituency
Candidate	Party	Votes	%
Yegor Ligachyov	Independent	95,226	22.18%
Gennady Khandorin	Independent	94,339	21.97%
Stepan Sulakshin (incumbent)	Independent	80,089	18.66%
Oleg Pletnev	Yabloko	63,014	14.68%
Marina Senkovskaya	Women of Russia	29,801	6.94%
Nelli Krechetova	Union of Right Forces	22,317	5.20%
Yevgeny Kostyuchenko	Independent	2,649	0.62%
Aleksandr Tolkachev	Independent	1,565	0.36%
against all		34,530	8.04%
Total		429,304	100%

=== 2003 ===
Summary of the 7 December 2003 Russian legislative election in the Tomsk constituency
Candidate	Party	Votes	%
Vladimir Zhidkikh	United Russia	218,822	52.50%
Yegor Ligachyov (incumbent)	Communist Party	97,180	23.31%
Aleksey Biryukov	Liberal Democratic Party	18,742	4.50%
Tatyana Kostyukova	Party of Russia's Rebirth-Russian Party of Life	17,092	4.10%
Yevgeny Krotov	Great Russia – Eurasian Union	7,139	1.71%
Boris Markelov	Independent	3,446	0.83%
Anatoly Koshelev	United Russian Party Rus'	3,186	0.76%
against all		47,219	11.33%
Total		417,155	100%

=== 2016 ===
Summary of the 18 September 2016 Russian legislative election in the Tomsk constituency
Candidate	Party	Votes	%
Aleksey Didenko	Liberal Democratic Party	45,583	34.10%
Aleksandr Rostovtsev	A Just Russia	23,058	17.25%
Aleksey Fyodorov	Communist Party	20,469	15.31%
Andrey Volkov	Communists of Russia	9,789	7.32%
Vasily Yeryomin	Yabloko	8,528	6.38%
Sergey Zhabin	The Greens	6,043	4.52%
Yegor Belyanko	Party of Growth	5,680	4.25%
Yevgeny Krotov	Patriots of Russia	3,822	2.86%
Total		133,658	100%

=== 2021 ===
Summary of the 17-19 September 2021 Russian legislative election in the Tomsk constituency
Candidate	Party	Votes	%
Aleksey Didenko (incumbent)	Liberal Democratic Party	35,156	22.33%
Ilya Leontyev	United Russia	34,486	21.91%
Vasily Shipilov	Communist Party	28,396	18.04%
Aleksandr Rostovtsev	A Just Russia — For Truth	16,994	10.80%
Aleksandr Tsin-De-Shan	New People	12,436	7.90%
Viktor Grinev	Party of Pensioners	7,852	4.99%
Yelena Ulyanova	Party of Growth	5,780	3.67%
Vasily Yeryomin	Yabloko	4,733	3.01%
Yevgeny Krotov	Rodina	3,717	2.36%
Total		157,409	100%

=== 2026 ===
Summary of the 18-20 September 2026 Russian legislative election in the Tomsk constituency
Candidate	Party	Votes	%
Ilya Leontyev	United Russia	104,966	32.19%
Galina Nemtseva	A Just Russia	65,572	20.11%
Vladimir Cholakhyan	Communist Party	49,965	15.32%
Vasily Yeryomin	Yabloko	34,656	10.63%
Leonid Terekhov	Liberal Democratic Party	30,450	9.34%
Sergey Kukhalsky	New People	29,681	9.10%
Total		326,076	100%
