= Ob constituency =

Ob single-member constituency
- Constituency of the Russian State Duma

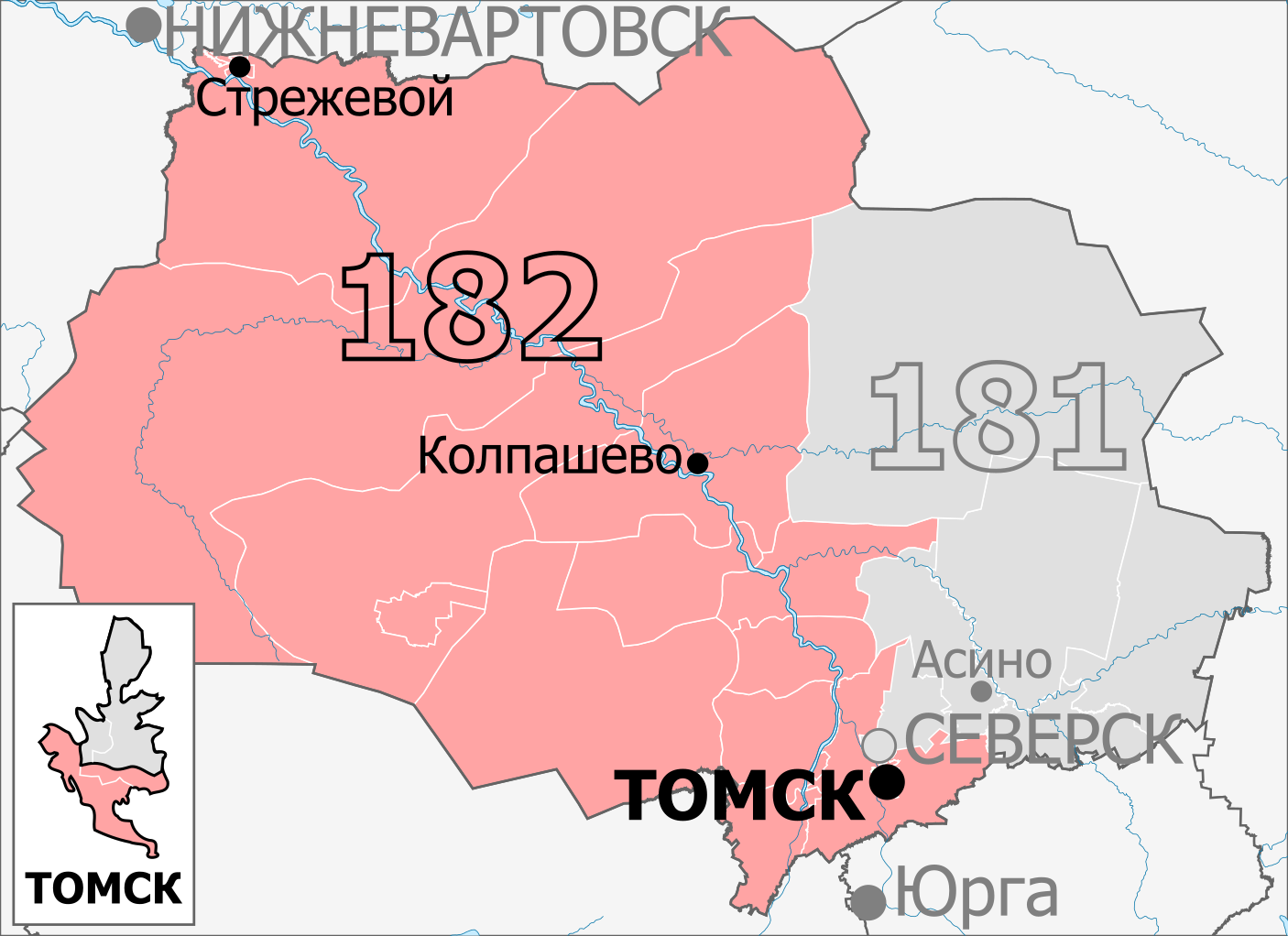
- Constituency boundaries from 2016 to 2026
- Deputy: None
- Federal subject: Tomsk Oblast
- Districts: Alexandrovsky, Bakcharsky, Chainsky, Kargasoksky, Kedrovy, Kolpashevsky, Kozhevnikovsky, Krivosheinsky, Molchanovsky, Parabelsky, Shegarsky, Strezhevoy, Tomsk (Kirovsky, Sovetsky), Tomsky (Bogashevskoye, Kaltayskoye, Kopylovskoye, Kornilovskoye, Mezheninovskoye, Mirnenskoye, Moryakovskoye, Novorozhdestvenskoye, Oktyabrskoye, Rybalovskoye, Spasskoye, Turuntayevskoye, Voroninskoye, Zarechnoye, Zorkaltsevskoye)
- Other territory: Germany (Hamburg-3)
- Voters: 380,126 (2021)

The Ob constituency (No.182 (Note: Tomsk Rural constituency No.174 in 1993-1995)) was a Russian legislative constituency in Tomsk Oblast in 1993–1995 and 2016–2026. The constituency covered southern half of Tomsk and sparsely populated western and central Tomsk Oblast, including oil-mining towns Kedrovy and Strezhevoy. After 2025 redistricting Tomsk Oblast lost one of its two constituencies, so Ob constituency was dissolved and merged with Tomsk constituency.

The constituency was last represented by United Russia deputy Tatyana Solomatina, Member of Legislative Duma of Tomsk Oblast and dermatologist. Solomatina sought re-election in 2026 in the Tomsk constituency but lost the primary to Tomsk Duma member Ilya Leontyev.

== Boundaries ==
1993–1995 Tomsk Rural constituency: Alexandrovsky District, Asino, Asinovsky District, Bakcharsky District, Chainsky District, Kargasoksky District, Kedrovsky District, Kolpashevo, Kolpashevsky District, Kozhevnikovsky District, Krivosheinsky District, Molchanovsky District, Parabelsky District, Pervomaysky District, Seversk, Shegarsky District, Strezhevoy, Teguldetsky District, Verkhneketsky District, Zyryansky District
The constituency covered most of Tomsk Oblast outside of the oblast capital Tomsk and its suburbs. After the 1995 redistricting Tomsk Oblast lost one of its two constituencies, so both Tomsk Rural and Tomsk Urban constituencies were merged into a single constituency, covering the entirety of Tomsk Oblast.

2016–2026: Alexandrovsky District, Bakcharsky District, Chainsky District, Kargasoksky District, Kedrovy, Kolpashevsky District, Kozhevnikovsky District, Krivosheinsky District, Molchanovsky District, Parabelsky District, Shegarsky District, Strezhevoy, Tomsk (Kirovsky, Sovetsky), Tomsky District (Bogashevskoye, Kaltayskoye, Kopylovskoye, Kornilovskoye, Mezheninovskoye, Mirnenskoye, Moryakovskoye, Novorozhdestvenskoye, Oktyabrskoye, Rybalovskoye, Spasskoye, Turuntayevskoye, Voroninskoye, Zarechnoye, Zorkaltsevskoye)
The constituency was re-created for the 2016 election. Tomsk Oblast re-gained a second district, so new Ob constituency took southern half of Tomsk and sparsely populated western and central Tomsk Oblast.

== Members elected ==
Election	Member	Party
1993	Stepan Sulakshin	Choice of Russia
1995	Constituency eliminated	
1999	Constituency eliminated	
2003	Constituency eliminated	
2007	Proportional representation - no election by constituency	
2011	Proportional representation - no election by constituency	
2016	Tatyana Solomatina	United Russia
2021	Tatyana Solomatina	United Russia

== Election results ==
=== 1993 ===
==== Declared candidates ====
- Mikhail Arpishkin (Independent), businessman
- Yury Krasnov (Independent), former Chairman of the Seversk City Council of People's Deputies (1990–1993)
- Vladimir Makarov (Independent), petrochemical executive
- Grigory Shamin (Independent), former Chairman of the Tomsk Oblast Council of People's Deputies (1992–1993)
- Stepan Sulakshin (Choice of Russia), Presidential Envoy to Tomsk Oblast (1991–present), former People's Deputy of the Soviet Union (1989–1991)
- Sergey Zhvachkin (Independent), oil construction executive

==== Results ====
Summary of the 12 December 1993 Russian legislative election in the Tomsk Rural constituency
Candidate	Party	Votes	%
Stepan Sulakshin	Choice of Russia	45,990	25.59%
Sergey Zhvachkin	Independent	33,707	18.76%
Grigory Shamin	Independent	25,253	14.05%
Vladimir Makarov	Independent	19,535	10.87%
Yury Krasnov	Independent	9,714	5.41%
Mikhail Arpishkin	Independent	6,104	3.40%
against all		27,305	15.19%
Total		179,708	100%

=== 2016 ===
==== Declared candidates ====
- Natalya Baryshnikova (CPRF), Member of Legislative Duma of Tomsk Oblast (2011–present)
- Sergey Bryansky (LDPR), Member of Legislative Duma of Tomsk Oblast (2012–present), aide to State Duma member Dmitry Savelyev
- Pyotr Chernogrivov (The Greens), director of the All-Russian Plant Quarantine Centre Tomsk division
- Mikhail Larin (Patriots of Russia), Siberian State Medical University department of traumatology, orthopedics, and military field surgery associate professor
- Maksim Luchshev (Party of Growth), chemical businessman
- Galina Nemtseva (A Just Russia), Member of State Duma (2016–present)
- Vasily Shipilov (CPCR), first secretary of the party regional office
- Tatyana Solomatina (United Russia), Member of Legislative Duma of Tomsk Oblast (2013–present), private clinic chain owner

==== Failed to qualify ====
- Marina Gannochenko (PRBR), individual entrepreneur

==== Declined ====
- Vitaly Ogleznev (United Russia), former Member of Legislative Duma of Tomsk Oblast (2011–2012), philosophy and law professor (lost the primary)
- Yelena Ushakova (United Russia), Member of State Duma (2013–present)

==== Results ====
Summary of the 18 September 2016 Russian legislative election in the Ob constituency
Candidate	Party	Votes	%
Tatyana Solomatina	United Russia	55,341	42.50%
Natalya Baryshnikova	Communist Party	18,102	13.90%
Sergey Bryansky	Liberal Democratic Party	17,035	13.08%
Galina Nemtseva	A Just Russia	16,594	12.74%
Vasily Shipilov	Communists of Russia	4,570	3.51%
Mikhail Larin	Patriots of Russia	4,379	3.38%
Pyotr Chernogrivov	The Greens	3,685	2.83%
Maksim Luchshev	Party of Growth	3,373	2.59%
Total		130,206	100%

=== 2021 ===
==== Declared candidates ====
- Danil Dorofeyev (LDPR), former Member of Duma of Tomsk (2015–2020)
- Sergey Guba (CPRF), former Member of Legislative Duma of Tomsk Oblast (2011–2016)
- Konstantin Lapshin (Rodina), construction executive
- Igor Lyutayev (Yabloko), Member of Duma of Tomsk (2020–present), ecological activist
- Galina Nemtseva (SR–ZP), Member of Legislative Duma of Tomsk Oblast (2007–2016, 2016–present), former Member of State Duma (2016), 2016 candidate for this seat
- Larisa Shevtsova (RPPSS), pensioner
- Tatyana Solomatina (United Russia), incumbent Member of State Duma (2016–present)
- Ksenia Starikova (New People), aide to Duma of Tomsk member

==== Results ====
Summary of the 17-19 September 2021 Russian legislative election in the Ob constituency
Candidate	Party	Votes	%
Tatyana Solomatina (incumbent)	United Russia	47,377	30.68%
Galina Nemtseva	A Just Russia — For Truth	30,551	19.78%
Sergey Guba	Communist Party	27,239	17.64%
Danil Dorofeyev	Liberal Democratic Party	12,926	8.37%
Ksenia Starikova	New People	12,453	8.06%
Larisa Shvetsova	Party of Pensioners	9,271	6.00%
Igor Lyutayev	Yabloko	5,063	3.28%
Konstantin Lapshin	Rodina	2,190	1.42%
Total		154,435	100%
