= Kozhevnikovo =

Kozhevnikovo (Russian: Кожевниково) is the name of several rural localities in Russia:

- Kozhevnikovo, Ivanovsky District, Ivanovo Oblast, a village in Ivanovsky District, Ivanovo Oblast
- Kozhevnikovo, Komsomolsky District, Ivanovo Oblast, a village in Komsomolsky District, Ivanovo Oblast
- Kozhevnikovo, Palekhsky District, Ivanovo Oblast, a village in Palekhsky District, Ivanovo Oblast
- Kozhevnikovo, Kemerovo Oblast, a village in Proskokovskaya Rural Territory of Yurginsky District of Kemerovo Oblast
- Kozhevnikovo, Novgorod Oblast, a village in Ilyinogorskoye Settlement of Demyansky District of Novgorod Oblast
- Kozhevnikovo, Novosibirsk Oblast, a selo in Barabinsky District of Novosibirsk Oblast
- Kozhevnikovo, Tomsk Oblast, a selo in Kozhevnikovsky District of Tomsk Oblast
- Kozhevnikovo, Staritsky District, Tver Oblast, a village in Bernovskoye Rural Settlement of Staritsky District of Tver Oblast
- Kozhevnikovo, Torzhoksky District, Tver Oblast, a village in Vysokovskoye Rural Settlement of Torzhoksky District of Tver Oblast
- Kozhevnikovo, Sheksninsky District, Vologda Oblast, a village in Domshinsky Selsoviet of Sheksninsky District of Vologda Oblast
- Kozhevnikovo, Ust-Kubinsky District, Vologda Oblast, a village in Nikolsky Selsoviet of Ust-Kubinsky District of Vologda Oblast
- Kozhevnikovo, Vologodsky District, Vologda Oblast, a village in Semenkovsky Selsoviet of Vologodsky District of Vologda Oblast
- Kozhevnikovo, Nekouzsky District, Yaroslavl Oblast, a village in Vereteysky Rural Okrug of Nekouzsky District of Yaroslavl Oblast
- Kozhevnikovo, Rybinsky District, Yaroslavl Oblast, a village in Arefinsky Rural Okrug of Rybinsky District of Yaroslavl Oblast
