= Siberian Light Aviation Flight 42 =

2021 aviation accident in Russia

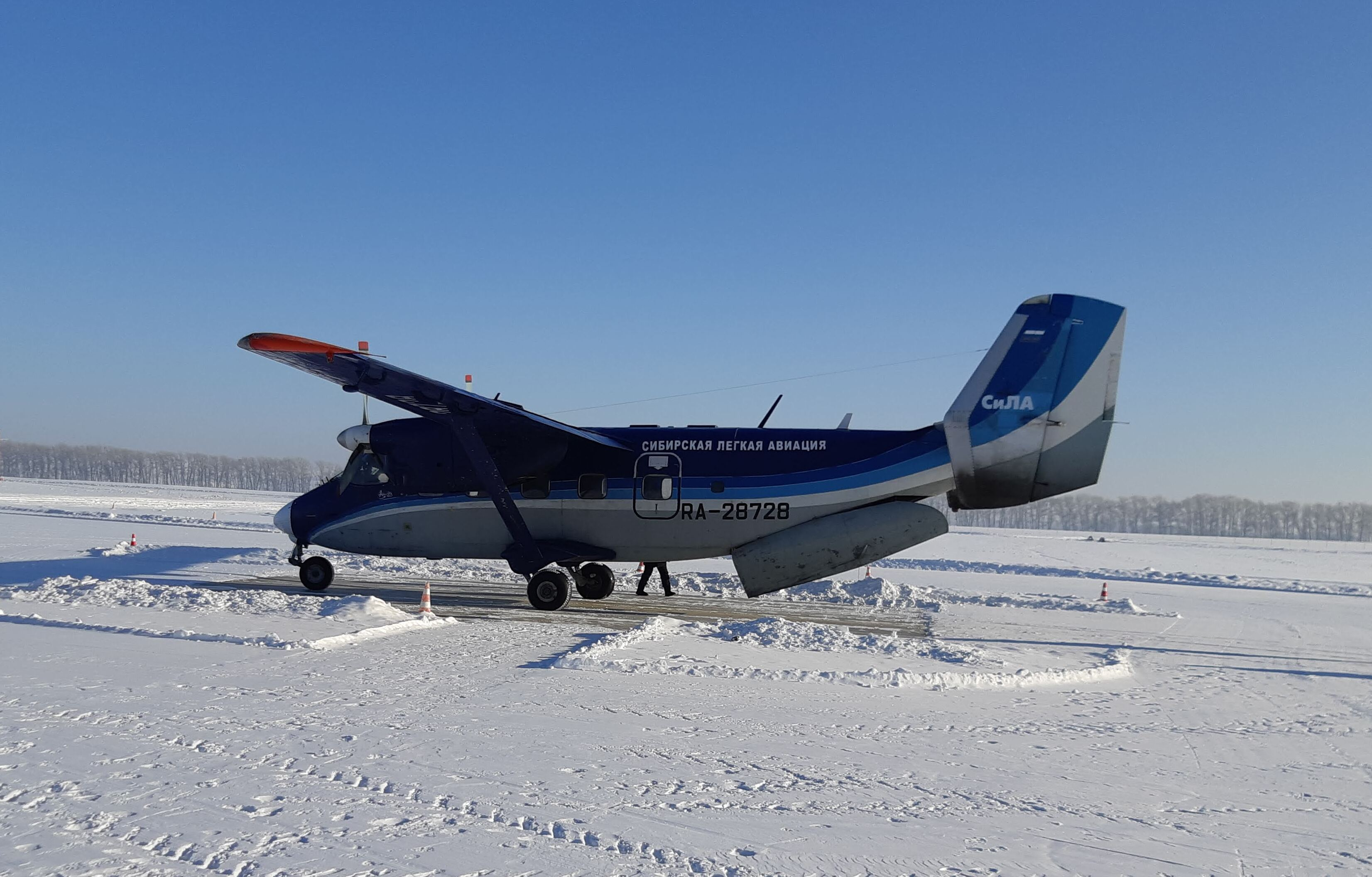
- RA-28728, the aircraft involved in the accident, seen in January 2021

Accident
- Date: 16 July 2021
- Summary: Engine failure due to icing and pilot error
- Site: Bakcharsky District, Tomsk Oblast, Russia

Aircraft
- Aircraft type: Antonov An-28
- Operator: Siberian Light Aviation
- ICAO flight No.: CJI42
- Registration: RA-28728
- Flight origin: Kedrovy, Tomsk Oblast, Russia
- Destination: Bogashevo Airport, Tomsk, Russia
- Occupants: 18
- Passengers: 14
- Crew: 4
- Fatalities: 0
- Injuries: 11
- Survivors: 18

Siberian Light Aviation Flight 42 was a domestic Russian scheduled passenger flight from Kedrovy to Tomsk, both in Tomsk Oblast in Siberia. On 16 July 2021, the Antonov An-28 operating the flight suffered icing in the engines leading to a dual engine failure 10 minutes into the flight and crash landed in a remote area in the Vasyugan Swamp in the Bakcharsky District. The pilot suffered a broken leg requiring surgery, but all of the remaining passengers and crew escaped with only minor injuries.

An investigation ultimately concluded that the pilots of the aircraft had not activated the anti-icing system, which led to an accumulation of ice, resulting in engine failure. Initially praised as a hero for his handling of the incident, the captain of the flight was ultimately criminally charged for violating safety protocols, leading to the crash.

== Background ==
The town of Kedrovy, where the flight originated, does not have a year-round road connection with the rest of Russia, so flights into the city are the only method of ferrying passengers and cargo, especially in the summer when the surrounding peatlands are not frozen. Local authorities established a subsidized flight schedule between Kedrovy and Tomsk in 2019, with the cost of a ticket set at 2,000 rubles (about 65 US Dollars). Tickets sell out quickly and empty seats on the flights are rare. On July 16, 2021, the flight from Kedrovy to Tomsk was delayed up to ten hours due to poor weather conditions.

Construction of the Antonov An-28 aircraft (registration number RA-28728, plant number 1AJ007-13, serial number 07-13), was completed on January 30, 1990, at the PZL-Mielec plant (Mielec, Poland). In April 1990 it was transferred to the Soviet Aeroflot under the tail number СССР-28728 (USSR-28728). Until 1991, it was operated in the Kyrgyz UGA of Aeroflot, later transferred to the Airways of Kyrgyzstan (Russian: Авиалинии Киргизстана). In 2006, it was purchased by the Russian airline Region Avia. In 2014, it was transferred to "SiLA", who was operating it at the time of the accident. Its airworthiness certificate was valid until the end of January 2022, not to exceed 9000 flight hours and 7000 flight cycles. At the time of the accident, it had completed 8698 flight hours and 5921 flight cycles.

== Crew ==
The captain of the aircraft was Anatoly Yakovlevich Prytkov, age 56. He had been continuously employed by SiLA since 2015. He served in the armed forces of the USSR between 1988 and 1992 as a pilot and had worked for several airlines since leaving the armed forces. At the time of the accident, he had a total of 7,906 hours of flight experience, including 3,970 in the AN-28, 111 of those as captain. He received serious injuries in the accident.

The first officer of the aircraft was Farukh Khasanov, age 32. He was a graduate of the State Flight Academy of Ukraine. He had been employed at the airline since February 2021, and completed his training with the airline in May 2021. At the time of the accident, he had a total of 174 hours of flight time, including 19 hours in the An-28.

Prior to takeoff, the crew agreed that the first officer would be conducting active piloting and the captain would perform monitoring and communication duties. After the engines stalled during the flight, the captain took over flight responsibilities.

== Accident ==
Flight SL 42 departed from the airport of the city of Kedrovy behind schedule at 3:58 p.m. local time. Ten minutes into the flight, at an altitude of 3,000 metres (10,000 ft) and 70 kilometres (40 mi) from its origin airport, both engines of the aircraft failed. The pilots attempted to restart the engines, but were unsuccessful.

In interviews after the accident, the captain reported that after the aircraft entered thick cloud, icing occurred in the engines, causing both to fail. The passengers prepared for a crash landing and the pilots attempted to touch down in an area where the trees were the least dense, but after touching down the aircraft sank into the mud and the pilot realized that the chosen landing site was actually a soft peat bog. After striking the soft surface, the aircraft rolled over onto its roof and the passengers were suspended upside down in their seats.

== Aftermath ==
When the aircraft crashed, it disappeared from radar screens and the crew did not respond to air traffic control's radio requests. Shortly afterward, the COSPAS-SARSAT system detected an emergency beacon signal in the Bakcharsky District. Upon receiving the signal, Emercom of Russia dispatched three Mi-8 helicopters to search for the missing aircraft.

On the ground, crew members were concerned about the possibility of an explosion in the inverted aircraft, and quickly evacuated the passengers from the aircraft. Not expecting to be rescued quickly, the survivors began to set up a shelter for the night. The crash site was located by helicopters that spotted a long path of fallen trees, the overturned aircraft, and smoke from a fire at the camp. All-terrain vehicles made the trip across the difficult terrain and arrived about an hour later. The pilots were praised for their ability to land the crippled aircraft without any critical injuries or fatalities.

The aircraft was removed from the swamp in August 2021 and taken to the village of Kargasok where it was to be inspected. Authorities indicated that the aircraft was repairable, but it was not economically feasible to do so. It will be scrapped after the conclusion of the investigation.

In October 2021, the directors of the airline fired general director Andrey Aleksanfrovich Bogdanov and director of flight services Dmitry Valeryevich Kolokoltsev. In a message, the directors cited the recent air accidents and shortcomings identified by oversight agencies.

== Injuries ==
After the crash, twelve of the occupants evacuated by helicopter from the crash site to Tomsk, but six passengers refused to fly again and were taken to the nearest road by all-terrain vehicle, then transferred to a bus. The captain suffered a broken leg that required surgery, and a 17-year-old passenger was treated for a concussion. The rest of the passengers and crew members received minor injuries, but there were no fatalities. In the days after the incident, the airline reported that it was providing 100,000 rubles (approximately $1,300 / £980 / €1,150) in compensation to each of the passengers of the flight.

== Investigation ==
Crash investigators announced that they would be investigating four possibilities of the cause of the accident, including problems with the fuel, equipment malfunction, extreme weather, and pilot error, with a preliminary report expected around late August 2021. On July 19, investigators revealed that they had recovered the flight data recorder and that the data was being recovered. The aircraft was not equipped with a cockpit voice recorder.

In the days following the accident, a source close to the investigation told reporters that the main theory of the cause of the crash was that the aircraft entered a region of high humidity, which led to the air intakes of the engines becoming obstructed with ice. Still unknown was why the anti-icing systems aboard the aircraft failed to prevent the buildup and why the flight took off in the conditions in the first place. Another source indicated that there was a possibility that the pilots had failed to pay attention to the fuel levels in the aircraft, pointing to the severe damage to the aircraft and the fact that the fuel did not leak out and cause a fire or explosion in the crash. On July 16, 2021, the investigative authorities of the Investigative Committee of Russia opened a criminal case on the grounds of a crime under Art. 263 Criminal Code of Russia (violation of traffic safety rules and operation of air transport). However, if the investigation finds that the accident was caused by something outside the control of the pilots, the crew can count on awards for skill and courage in safely guiding the stricken aircraft to the ground.

On 28 July 2021, a source told reporters that the flight data showed that the aircraft had leveled off at 3,100 metres (10,200 ft), which was lower than the assigned altitude. About a minute after leveling off, the engines failed, about three seconds apart. The automatic icing warning system did not indicate that the plane was suffering from icing, and the anti-ice system of the engines and airframe did not start. Investigators also revealed that they were looking into the work and rest schedule of the flight crews at the airline, after they discovered that the crew involved with the crash had performed ten flights totaling 12.5 hours in the previous 24 hours before the crash.

In September 2021, The Interstate Aviation Committee published a preliminary report on the accident. The report stated that the amount of oil, fuel, and hydraulic fluid that had been loaded on the aircraft were appropriate for the scheduled trip, but that the flight crew had been severely overworked in the days preceding the accident, including having flown nine other flights totaling nearly 14 hours in the previous 24 hours, and had not been given time to rest. The report stated that while in flight, the engines of the aircraft iced up and stalled, and were not able to be restarted before the crash. The committee resolved to release a final report on the accident at a future date.

In December 2021, investigators disclosed that they had narrowed their investigation to two possible causes of the crash. One possible explanation was that the anti-icing system had malfunctioned, causing the icing of the engines. The other possibility that they are investigating was whether the anti-icing system had been activated by the crew too late due to crew fatigue.

In July 2022, officials announced that they had concluded that the cause of the accident was determined to be that due to crew fatigue, the aircraft's anti-icing system had not been turned on at the appropriate time, which led to the accumulation of ice and engine failure. The pilot was criminally charged for a violation of aircraft safety rules.

In September 2023, the IAC published their final report on the accident, reiterating the findings of the preliminary report. The flight crew's stress and a faulty ice detection sensor were additional contributing factors. In December that year, the criminal case against captain Prytkov was closed due to the statute of limitations expiring.
