= Kozhevnikovsky =

Kozhevnikovsky (masculine), Kozhevnikovskaya (feminine), or Kozhevnikovskoye (neuter) may refer to:

- Kozhevnikovsky District, a district of Tomsk Oblast, Russia
- Kozhevnikovskaya, a rural locality (a village) in Vologda Oblast, Russia
