= Melnikovo, Tomsk Oblast =

Melnikovo Мельниково
- Selo
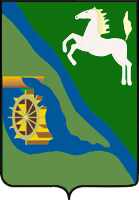
- Coat of arms
- Interactive map of Melnikovo
- Location of Melnikovo Melnikovo (Tomsk Oblast)
- Coordinates: 56°34′N 84°06′E
- Country: Russia
- Federal subject: Tomsk Oblast
- Administrative district: Shegarsky District
- Founded: 1616

Population (2010 Census)
  - Total: 8,377
  - Estimate (2021): 8,274 (−1.2%)

Administrative status
  - Capital of: Shegarsky District
- Time zone: UTC+7 (MSK+4)
- Postal code: 636131
- OKTMO ID: 69658485101

Melnikovo (Russian: Мельниково) is a rural locality (a selo) and the administrative center of Shegarsky District of Tomsk Oblast, Russia, located near the Ob River. Population: 8,377 (2010 census); 9,717 (2002 census); 10,130 (1989 Soviet census).
