= Molchanovo, Tomsk Oblast =

Rural locality in Tomsk Oblast, Russia

Coordinates: 57°34′55″N 83°45′55″E

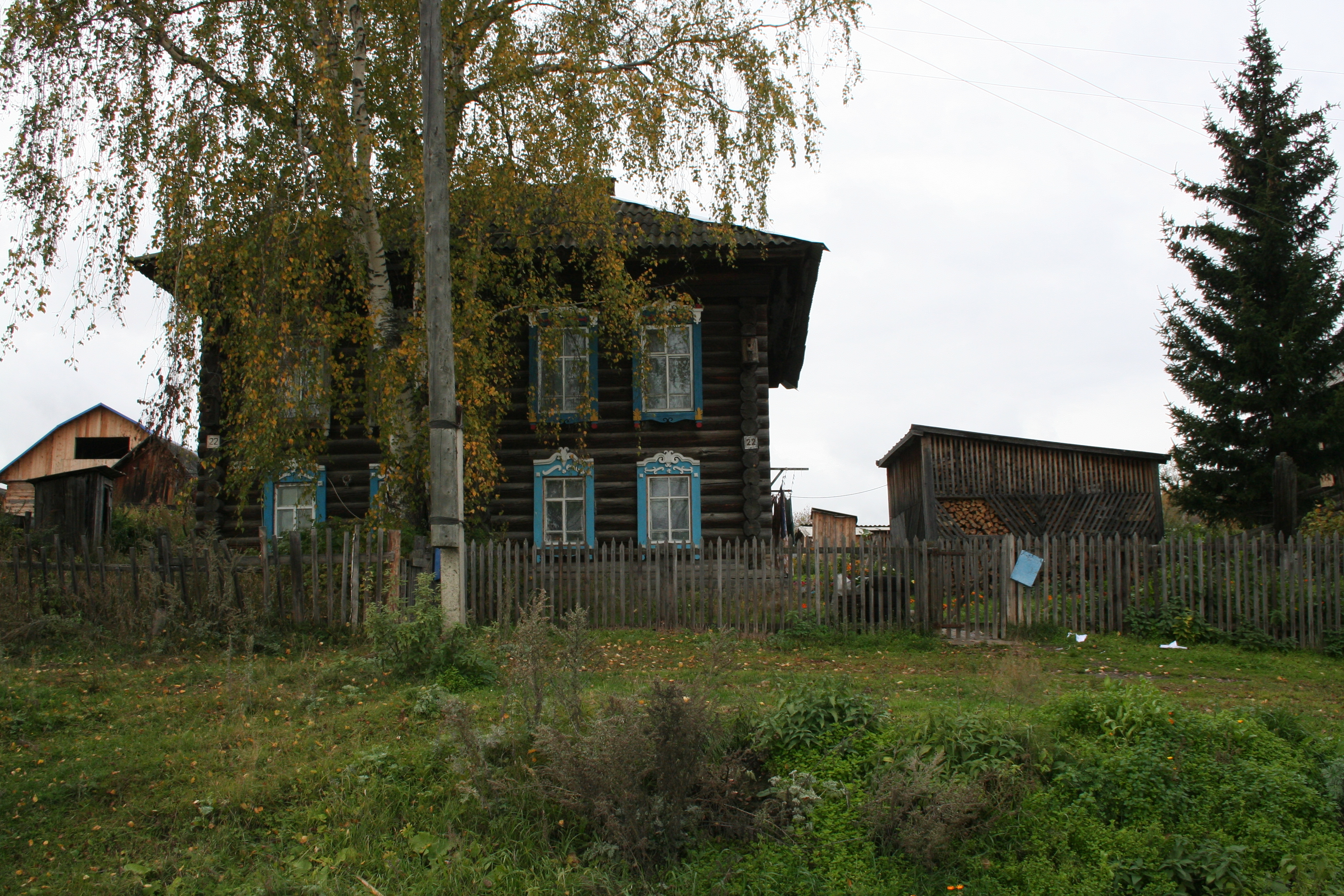
Wooden buildings in Molchanovo

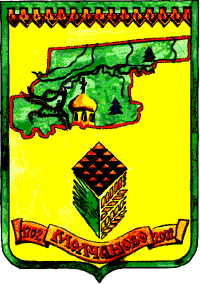
Coat of arms of Molchanovo

Molchanovo (Russian: Молчаново, Selkup: Малҗӓнва эд) is a rural locality (a selo) and the administrative center of Molchanovsky District, Tomsk Oblast, Russia. Population: 5,746 (2010 census); 6,091 (2002 census); 6,411 (1989 Soviet census).
