= Zyryanskoye, Tomsk Oblast =

Rural locality in Tomsk Oblast, Russia

Coordinates: 56°49′57″N 86°37′25″E

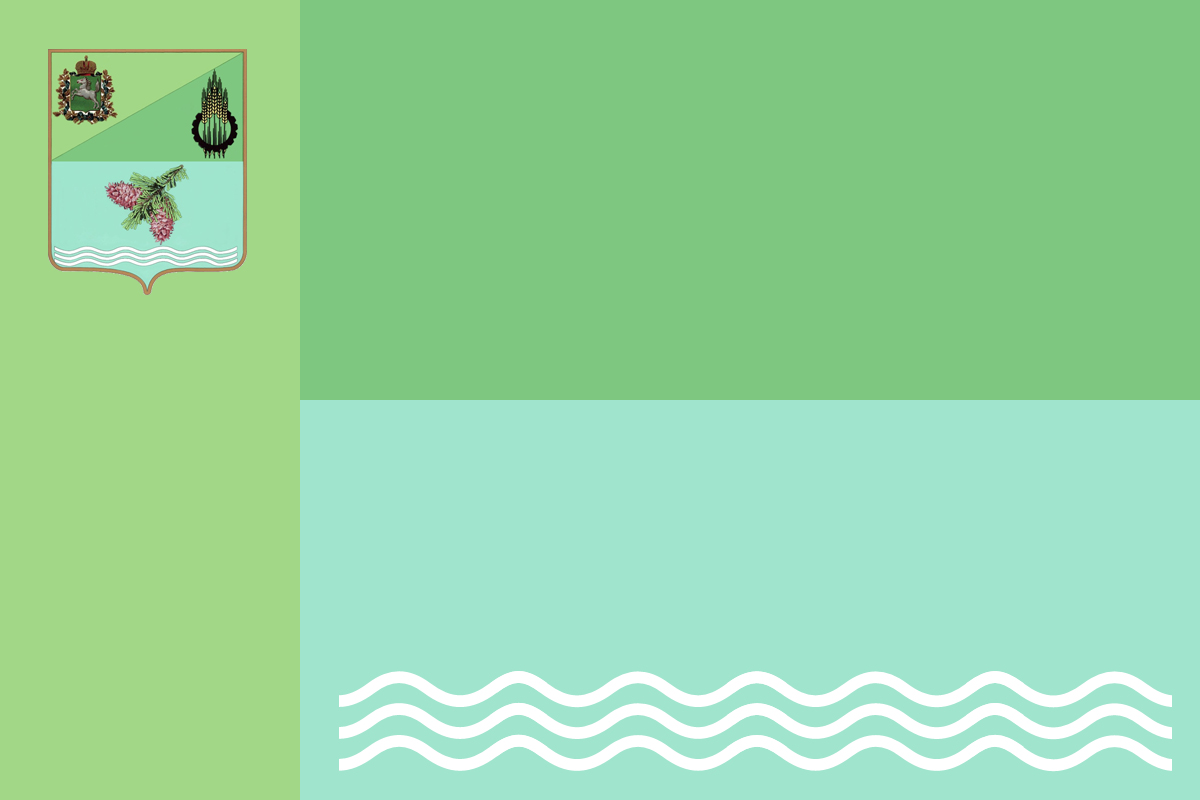
Flag of Zyryanskoye

Zyryanskoye (Russian: Зырянское) is a rural locality (a selo) and the administrative center of Zyryansky District, Tomsk Oblast, Russia. Population: 5,632 (2010 census); 6,267 (2002 census); 7,514 (1989 Soviet census).
