= Kozhevnikova Bay =

Bay in Russia

Coordinates: 73°50′N 110°00′E

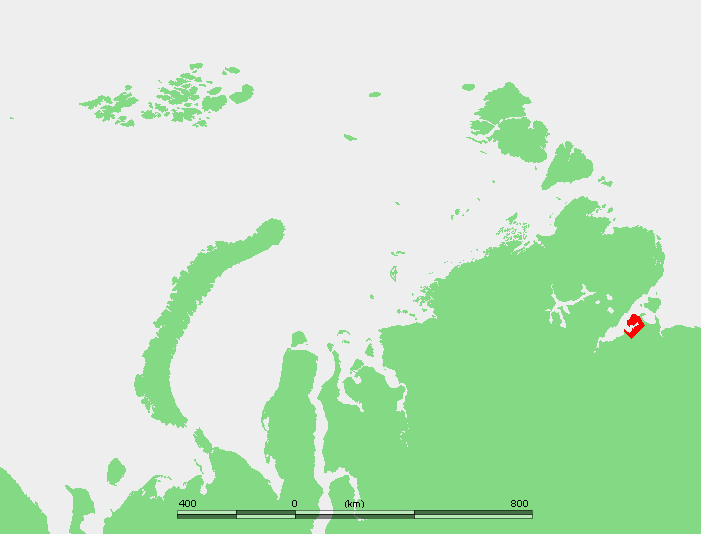
Map showing the location of Kozhevnikova Bay. Note the Hara-Tumus Peninsula at its eastern end.

Kozhevnikova Bay (Russian: б́ухта Коже́вникова, bukhta Kozhevnikova) is a gulf in the southern shore the Khatanga Gulf, Laptev Sea, located west of the Hara Tumus Peninsula. Its coast is desolate as there is no vegetation except for tundra. Since its shores receive alluvial deposits eroded from the cliffs located north of the Khatanga Gulf, they are quite stable.

During the 1930s, this area experienced a limited boom owing to the first icebreaker convoys plying the Northern Sea Route. There was a town called Kozhevnikovo and a settlement called Ugolny close to the Kozhevnikova Bay's shore.

Kozhevnikova Bay is 23 km wide and 48 km in length and it is circled by lowlands. Since the climate in the area is exceptionally severe, with prolonged, Arctic winters, it is covered by ice most of the year.

Kozhevnikova Bay and its surrounding area belongs to the Krasnoyarsk Krai administrative division of the Russian Federation.
