= Molchanovsky =

Molchanovsky (masculine), Molchanovskaya (feminine), or Molchanovskoye (neuter) may refer to:

- Molchanovsky District, a district of Tomsk Oblast, Russia
- Molchanovsky (rural locality), a rural locality (a settlement) in Tambov Oblast, Russia
