= Administrative divisions of Tomsk Oblast =

Divisions of Tomsk Oblast, Russia

Tomsk Oblast Russia
- Administrative center: Tomsk

Administrative structure (as of 2010)
- Districts: 16
- Cities/towns: 6
- Urban-type settlements: 1
- Rural okrugs, rural territorial administrations, rural territorial okrugs, selsovets, and territorial okrugs: 117

Municipal structure (as of 2002)
- Rural settlements: 606 (inhabited); 28 (uninhabited)

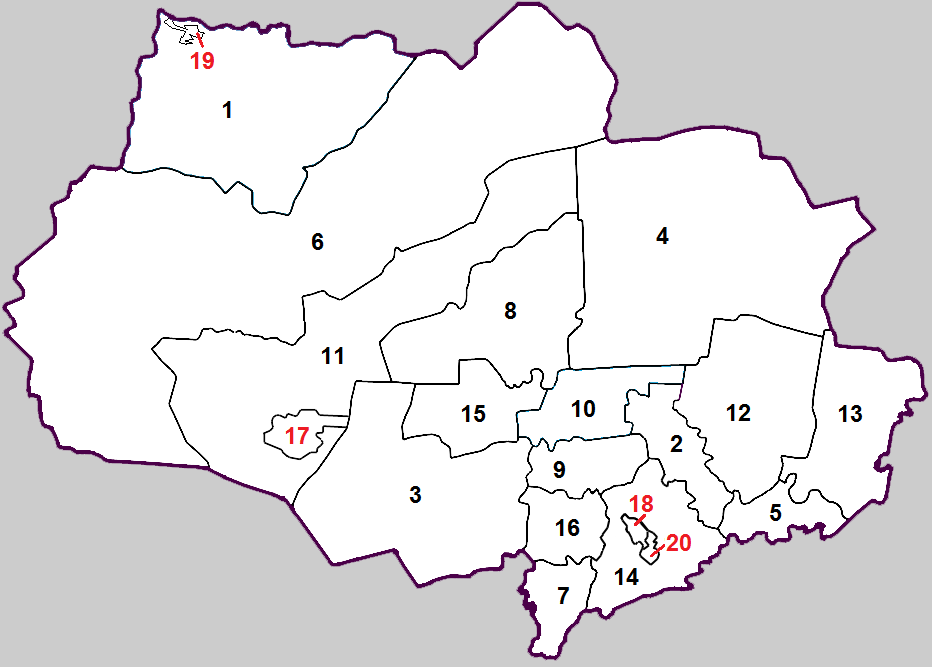
Map of Administrative Divisions of Tomsk Oblast (with numbered)

Tomsk Oblast is a federal subject of Russia.

== Administrative and municipal divisions ==
Map

| Division | | Structure | | OKATO | OKTMO | Urban-type settlement/ district-level town* | Rural |
| Division | | Administrative | Municipal | OKATO | OKTMO | Urban-type settlement/ district-level town* | Rural |
|---|---|---|---|---|---|---|---|
| Seversk (Северск) | | city (ZATO) | urban okrug | 69 541 | 69 741 | | |
| Tomsk (Томск) | | city | urban okrug | 69 401 | 69 701 | | |
| ↳ | Kirovsky (Кировский) | (under Tomsk) | —N/a | 69 401 | —N/a | | |
| ↳ | Leninsky (Ленинский) | (under Tomsk) | —N/a | 69 401 | —N/a | | |
| ↳ | Oktyabrsky (Октябрьский) | (under Tomsk) | —N/a | 69 401 | —N/a | | |
| ↳ | Sovetsky (Советский) | (under Tomsk) | —N/a | 69 401 | —N/a | | |
| Kedrovy (Кедровый) | | city | urban okrug | 69 407 | 69 707 | | |
| Strezhevoy (Стрежевой) | | city | urban okrug | 69 410 | 69 710 | | |
| Alexandrovsky (Александровский) | | district | | 69 204 | 69 604 | | 6 selsovets |
| Asinovsky (Асиновский) | | district | | 69 208 | 69 608 | Asino (Асино) town* | 6 rural okrugs |
| Bakcharsky (Бакчарский) | | district | | 69 212 | 69 612 | | 7 selsovets |
| Verkhneketsky (Верхнекетский) | | district | | 69 216 | 69 616 | Bely Yar (Белый Яр) | 8 selsovets |
| Zyryansky (Зырянский) | | district | | 69 220 | 69 620 | | 5 selsovets |
| Kargasoksky (Каргасокский) | | district | | 69 224 | 69 624 | | 13 selsovets |
| Kozhevnikovsky (Кожевниковский) | | district | | 69 228 | 69 628 | | 8 rural okrugs |
| Kolpashevsky (Колпашевский) | | district | | 69 232 | 69 632 | Kolpashevo (Колпашево) town* | 8 rural territorial administrations |
| Krivosheinsky (Кривошеинский) | | district | | 69 236 | 69 636 | | 7 selsovets |
| Molchanovsky (Молчановский) | | district | | 69 240 | 69 640 | | 5 territorial okrugs |
| Parabelsky (Парабельский) | | district | | 69 244 | 69 644 | | 5 rural okrugs |
| Pervomaysky (Первомайский) | | district | | 69 248 | 69 648 | | 6 rural okrugs |
| Teguldetsky (Тегульдетский) | | district | | 69 252 | 69 652 | | 4 selsovets |
| Tomsky (Томский) | | district | | 69 254 | 69 654 | | 19 rural okrugs |
| Chainsky (Чаинский) | | district | | 69 256 | 69 656 | | 4 rural territorial okrugs |
| Shegarsky (Шегарский) | | district | | 69 258 | 69 658 | | 6 rural okrugs |
