= Kozhevnikovo, Tomsk Oblast =

Kozhevnikovo Кожевниково
- Selo
- Interactive map of Kozhevnikovo
- Location of Kozhevnikovo Kozhevnikovo (Tomsk Oblast)
- Coordinates: 56°15′00″N 83°58′00″E
- Country: Russia
- Federal subject: Tomsk Oblast
- Administrative district: Kozhevnikovsky District
- Founded: 1733

Population (2010 Census)
  - Total: 8,174
  - Estimate (2021): 8,393 (+2.7%)

Administrative status
  - Capital of: Kozhevnikovsky District
- Time zone: UTC+7 (MSK+4)
- Postal code: 636160
- OKTMO ID: 69628435101

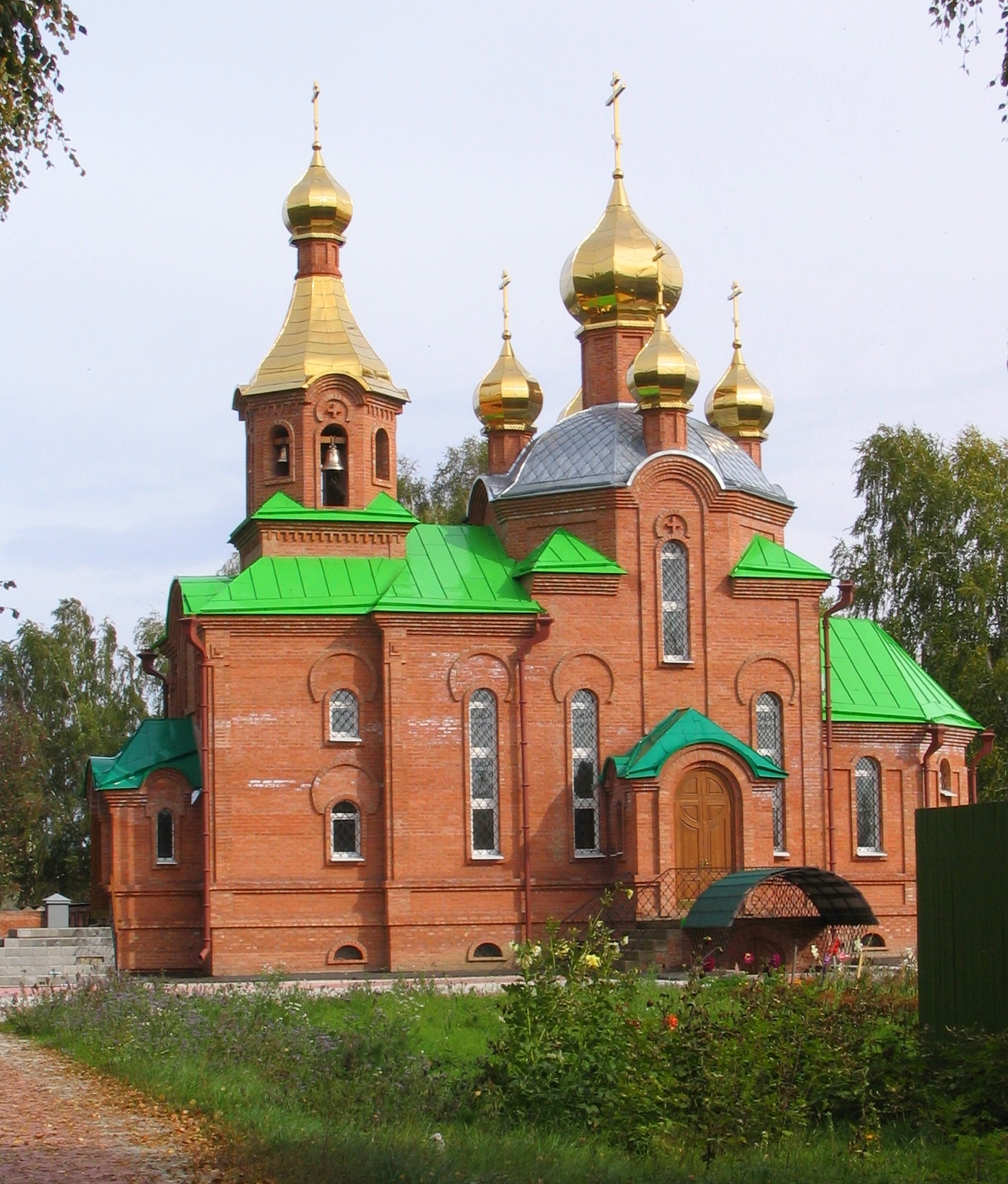
A church in Kozhevnikovo

Kozhevnikovo (Russian: Кожевниково) is a rural locality (a selo) and the administrative center of Kozhevnikovsky District of Tomsk Oblast, Russia, located on the Ob River. Population: 8,174 (2010 census); 7,947 (2002 census); 8,567 (1989 Soviet census).

== Notable people ==
- Konstantin Rausch (1990) — Russian-German footballer
