= Tatyana Solomatina =

Russian politician

- Татьяна Соломатина
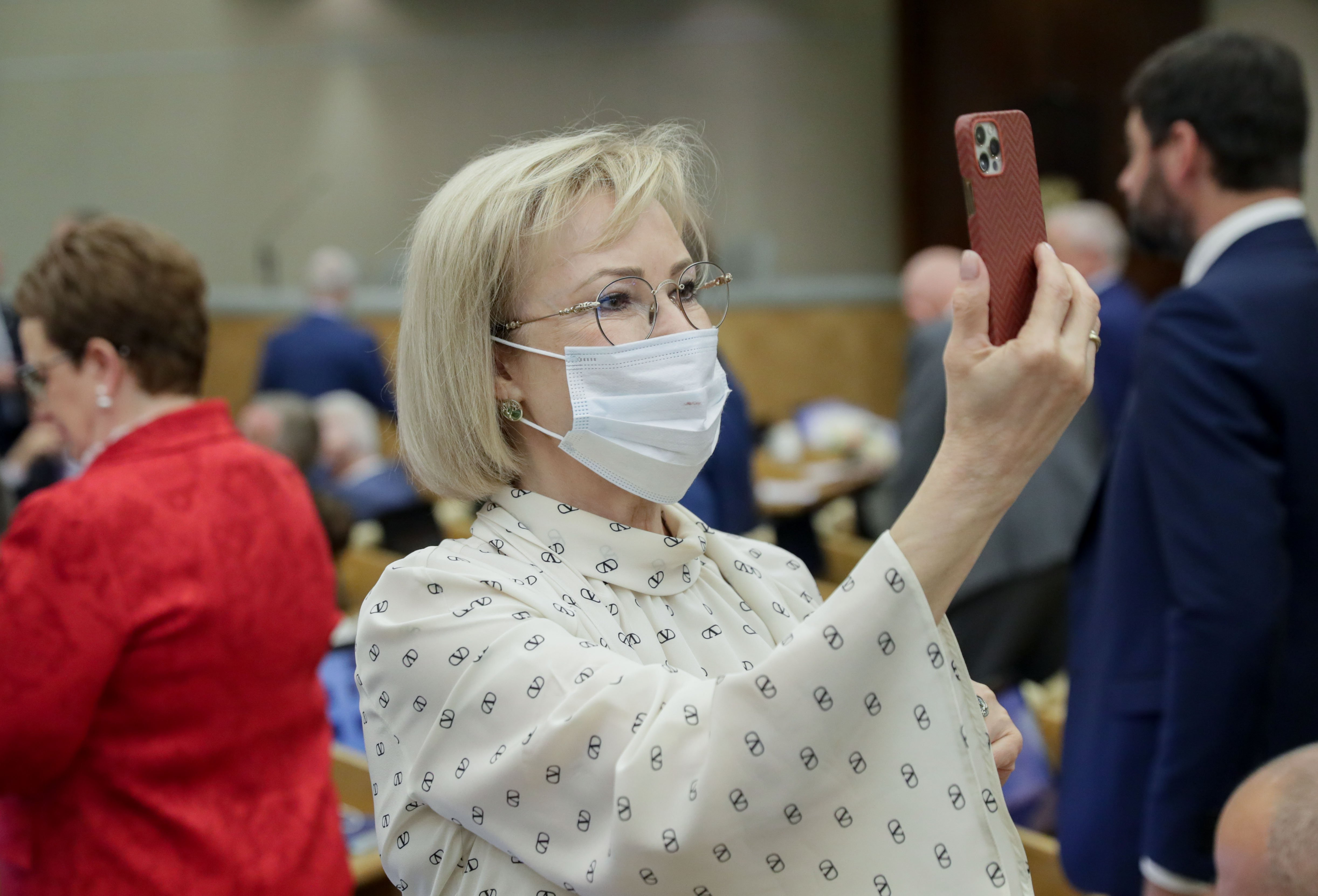
- Solomatina in 2021

Member of the State Duma for Tomsk Oblast
- Incumbent
- Assumed office 5 October 2016
- Preceded by: constituency re-established
- Constituency: Ob (No. 182)

Personal details
- Born: 21 April 1956 (age 70) Kuleevo, Kargasoksky District, Tomsk Oblast, RSFSR, USSR
- Party: United Russia
- Spouse: Viktor Solomatin
- Children: 1 daughter
- Education: Siberian State Medical University (MD, PhD)
- Occupation: Physician

Tatyana Vasilievna Solomatina (Russian: Татьяна Васильевна Соломатина; born 21 April 1956) is a Russian doctor, stateswoman and political figure. She represents the Ob constituency in the State Duma.

== Political career ==
A member of United Russia, Solomatina is the Deputy Chair of the State Duma Committee on Health Protection, Candidate of Medical Sciences.

In 2017, according to Forbes Woman magazine, she topped the rating of the ten richest female politicians in Russia. Her declared income for 2016 amounted to 56 million rubles.

== Sanctions ==
In December 2022 the EU sanctioned Tatyana Solomatina in relation to the 2022 Russian invasion of Ukraine.
