= Bakchar =

Rural locality in Tomsk Oblast, Russia

Coordinates: 57°01′16″N 82°04′20″E

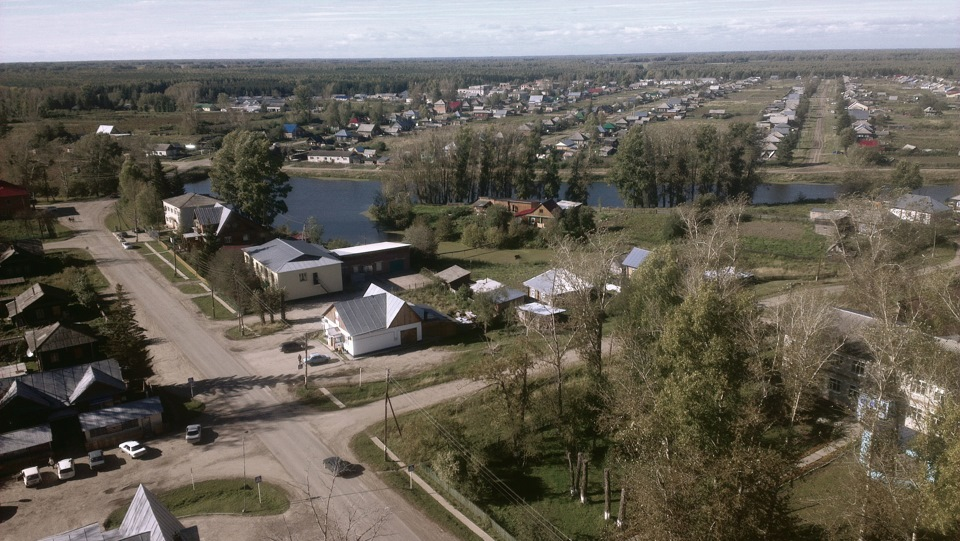
View of Bakchar

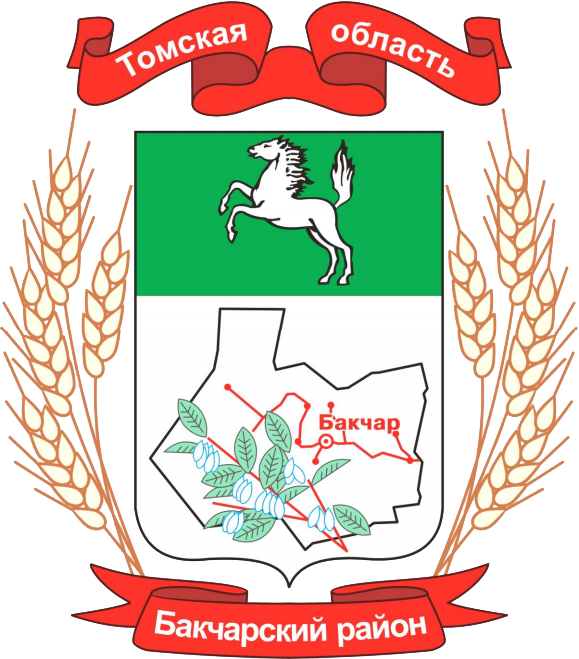
Coat of arms of Bakchar

Bakchar (Russian: Бакчар) is a rural locality (a selo) and the administrative center of Bakcharsky District, Tomsk Oblast, Russia. Population: 6,128 (2010 census); 7,174 (2002 census); 7,308 (1989 Soviet census).

== Climate ==
Climate data for Bakchar (extremes 1934-present)
Month	Jan	Feb	Mar	Apr	May	Jun	Jul	Aug	Sep	Oct	Nov	Dec	Year
Record high °C (°F)	6.1 (43.0)	6.4 (43.5)	14.0 (57.2)	29.5 (85.1)	34.9 (94.8)	36.2 (97.2)	36.5 (97.7)	32.6 (90.7)	30.9 (87.6)	23.0 (73.4)	9.6 (49.3)	5.1 (41.2)	36.5 (97.7)
Mean daily maximum °C (°F)	−13.7 (7.3)	−9.5 (14.9)	−0.7 (30.7)	8.6 (47.5)	17.4 (63.3)	22.8 (73.0)	24.7 (76.5)	21.6 (70.9)	14.8 (58.6)	6.2 (43.2)	−5.0 (23.0)	−11.5 (11.3)	6.3 (43.4)
Mean daily minimum °C (°F)	−23.4 (−10.1)	−20.7 (−5.3)	−13.3 (8.1)	−3.3 (26.1)	3.4 (38.1)	9.3 (48.7)	11.9 (53.4)	9.4 (48.9)	3.8 (38.8)	−1.9 (28.6)	−12.4 (9.7)	−20.2 (−4.4)	−4.8 (23.4)
Record low °C (°F)	−49.1 (−56.4)	−51.5 (−60.7)	−41.3 (−42.3)	−31.4 (−24.5)	−15.0 (5.0)	−3.7 (25.3)	0.4 (32.7)	−2.5 (27.5)	−8.3 (17.1)	−32.1 (−25.8)	−48.5 (−55.3)	−49.7 (−57.5)	−51.5 (−60.7)
Average precipitation mm (inches)	21.4 (0.84)	15.8 (0.62)	18.6 (0.73)	26.2 (1.03)	43.5 (1.71)	73.5 (2.89)	78.6 (3.09)	65.0 (2.56)	46.6 (1.83)	42.4 (1.67)	35.7 (1.41)	30.0 (1.18)	497.3 (19.56)
Source: Pogoda.ru.net
