= Zyryansky District =

Zyryansky District Зырянский район (Russian)
- District
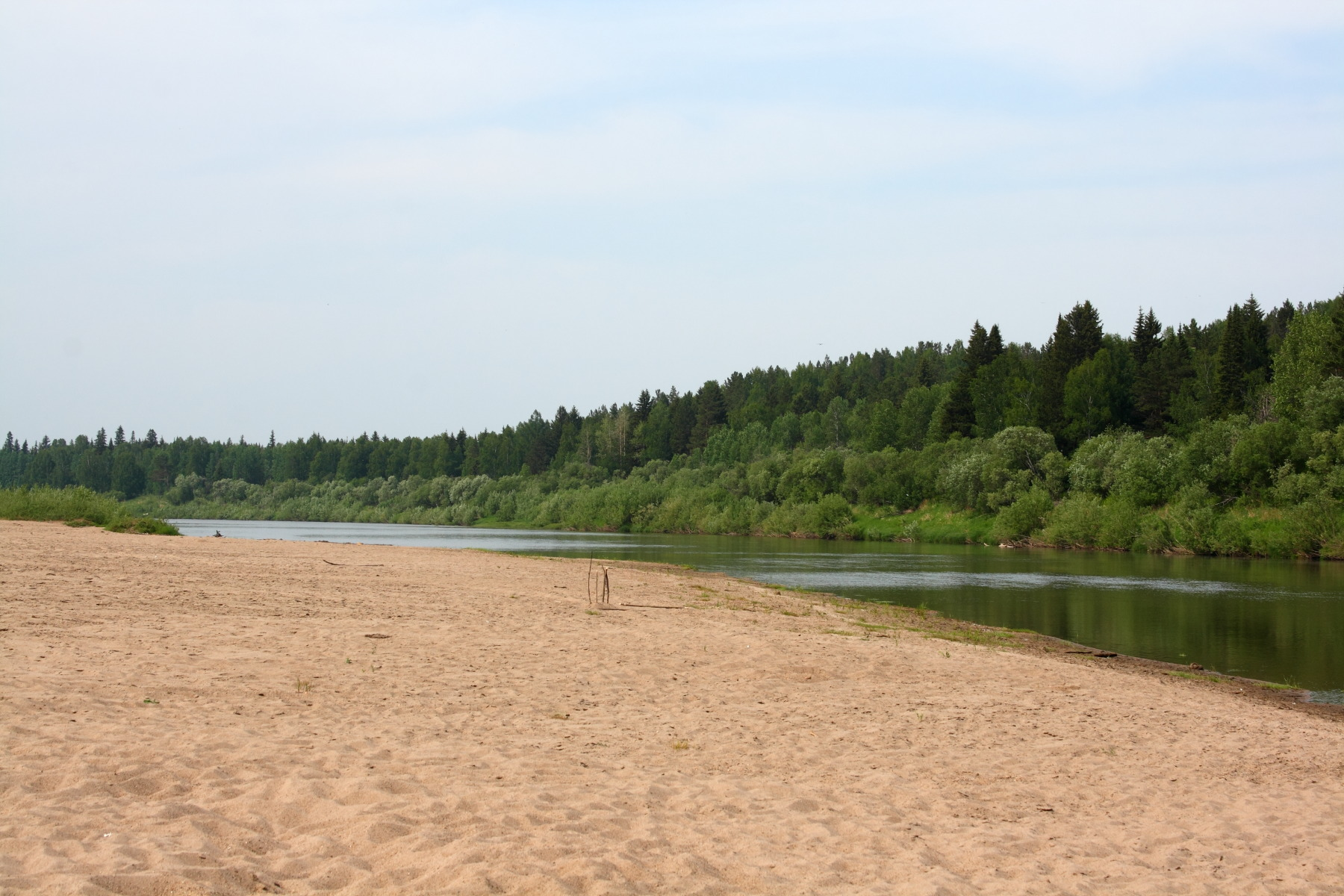
- Yaya River, Zyryansky District

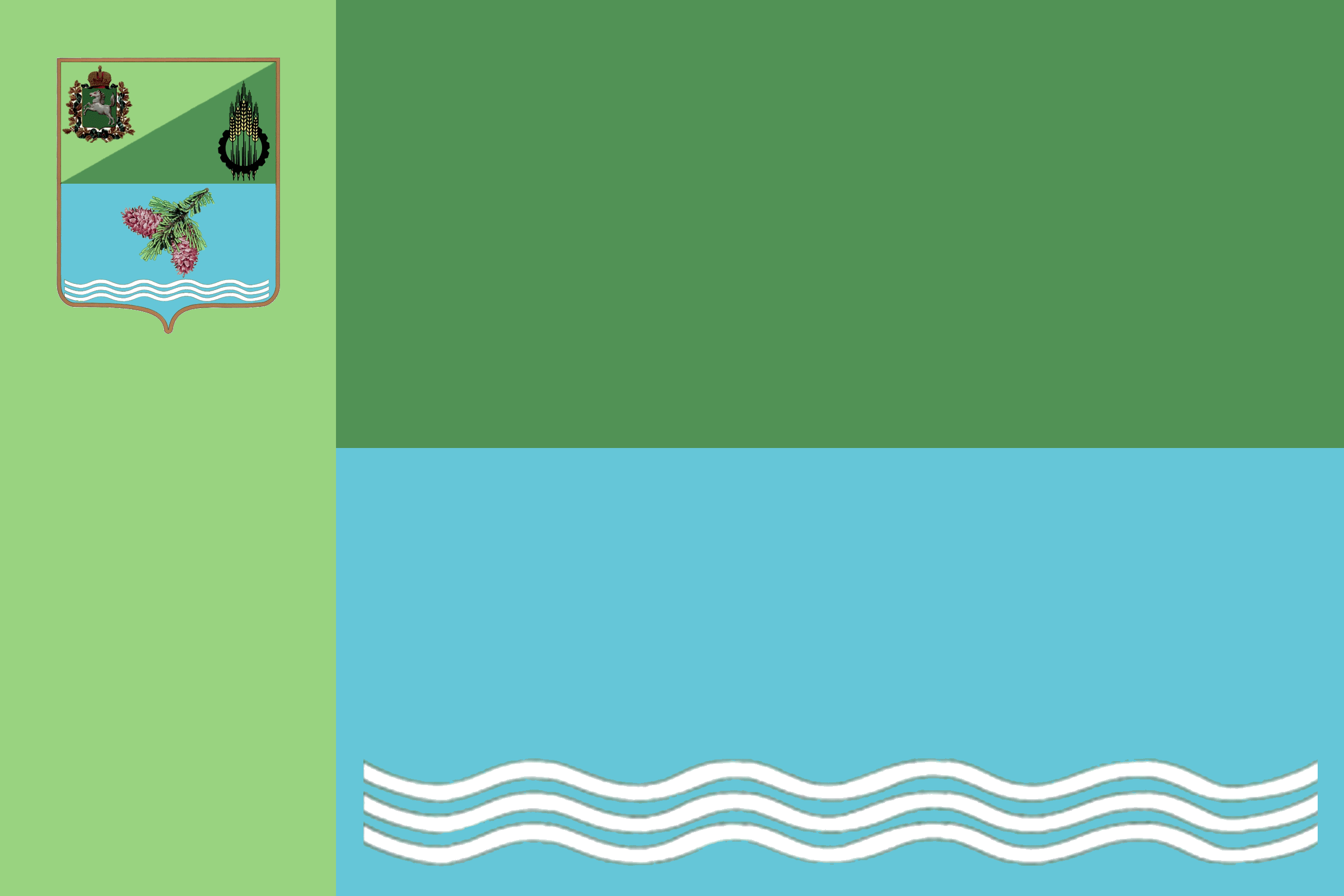
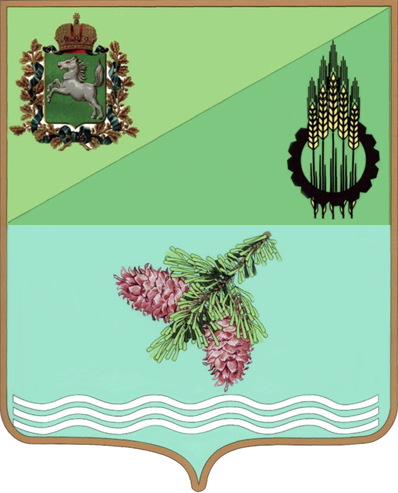
- Flag Coat of arms
- Location of Zyryansky District in Tomsk Oblast
- Coordinates: 56°50′N 86°37′E
- Country: Russia
- Federal subject: Tomsk Oblast
- Administrative center: Zyryanskoye

Area
  - Total: 3,966 km^{2} (1,531 sq mi)

Population (2010 Census)
  - Total: 13,179
  - Density: 3.323/km^{2} (8.607/sq mi)
  - Urban: 0%
  - Rural: 100%

Administrative structure
  - Inhabited localities: 25 rural localities

Municipal structure
  - Municipally incorporated as: Zyryansky Municipal District
  - Municipal divisions: 0 urban settlements, 5 rural settlements
- Time zone: UTC+7 (MSK+4)
- OKTMO ID: 69620000
- Website: http://zir.tomsknet.ru/

Zyryansky District (Russian: Зыря́нский райо́н) is an administrative and municipal district (raion), one of the sixteen in Tomsk Oblast, Russia. It is located in the east of the oblast. The area of the district is 3,966 square kilometers (1,531 sq mi). Its administrative center is the rural locality (a selo) of Zyryanskoye. Population: 13,179 (2010 Census); 16,052 (2002 census); 18,549 (1989 Soviet census). The population of Zyryanskoye accounts for 42.7% of the district's total population.
