= Shegarsky District =

Shegarsky District Шегарский район (Russian)
- District
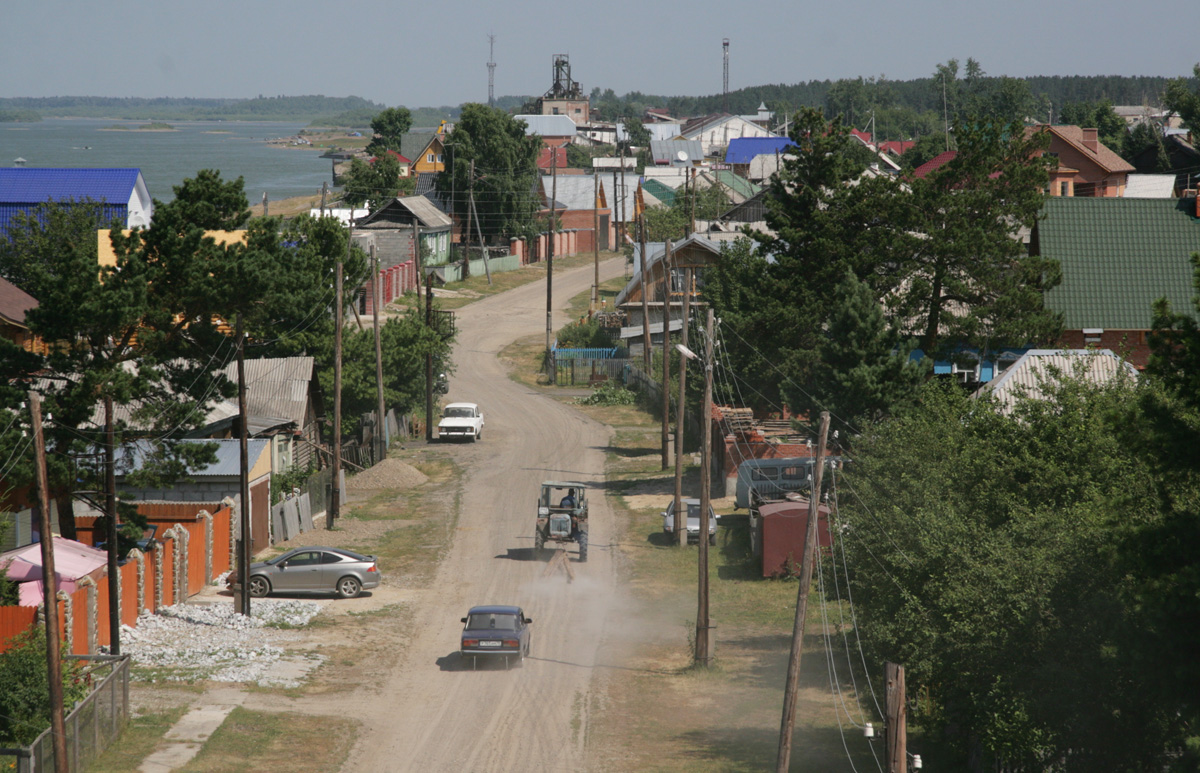
- Pobeda, Shegarsky District

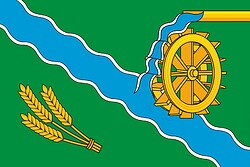
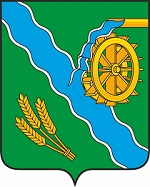
- Flag Coat of arms
- Location of Shegarsky District in Tomsk Oblast
- Coordinates: 56°33′N 84°04′E
- Country: Russia
- Federal subject: Tomsk Oblast
- Established: 1936
- Administrative center: Melnikovo

Area
  - Total: 5,029.54 km^{2} (1,941.92 sq mi)

Population (2010 Census)
  - Total: 20,306
  - Density: 4.0373/km^{2} (10.457/sq mi)
  - Urban: 0%
  - Rural: 100%

Administrative structure
  - Inhabited localities: 37 rural localities

Municipal structure
  - Municipally incorporated as: Shegarsky Municipal District
  - Municipal divisions: 0 urban settlements, 6 rural settlements
- Time zone: UTC+7 (MSK+4)
- OKTMO ID: 69658000
- Website: http://www.shegadm.ru/

Shegarsky District (Russian: Шега́рский райо́н) is an administrative and municipal district (raion), one of the sixteen in Tomsk Oblast, Russia. It is located in the southeast of the oblast. The area of the district is 5,029.54 square kilometers (1,941.92 sq mi). Its administrative center is the rural locality (a selo) of Melnikovo. Population: 20,306 (2010 Census); 22,551 (2002 census); 24,129 (1989 Soviet census). The population of Melnikovo accounts for 41.3% of the district's total population.
