= Tomsky District =

Tomsky District Томский район (Russian)
- District
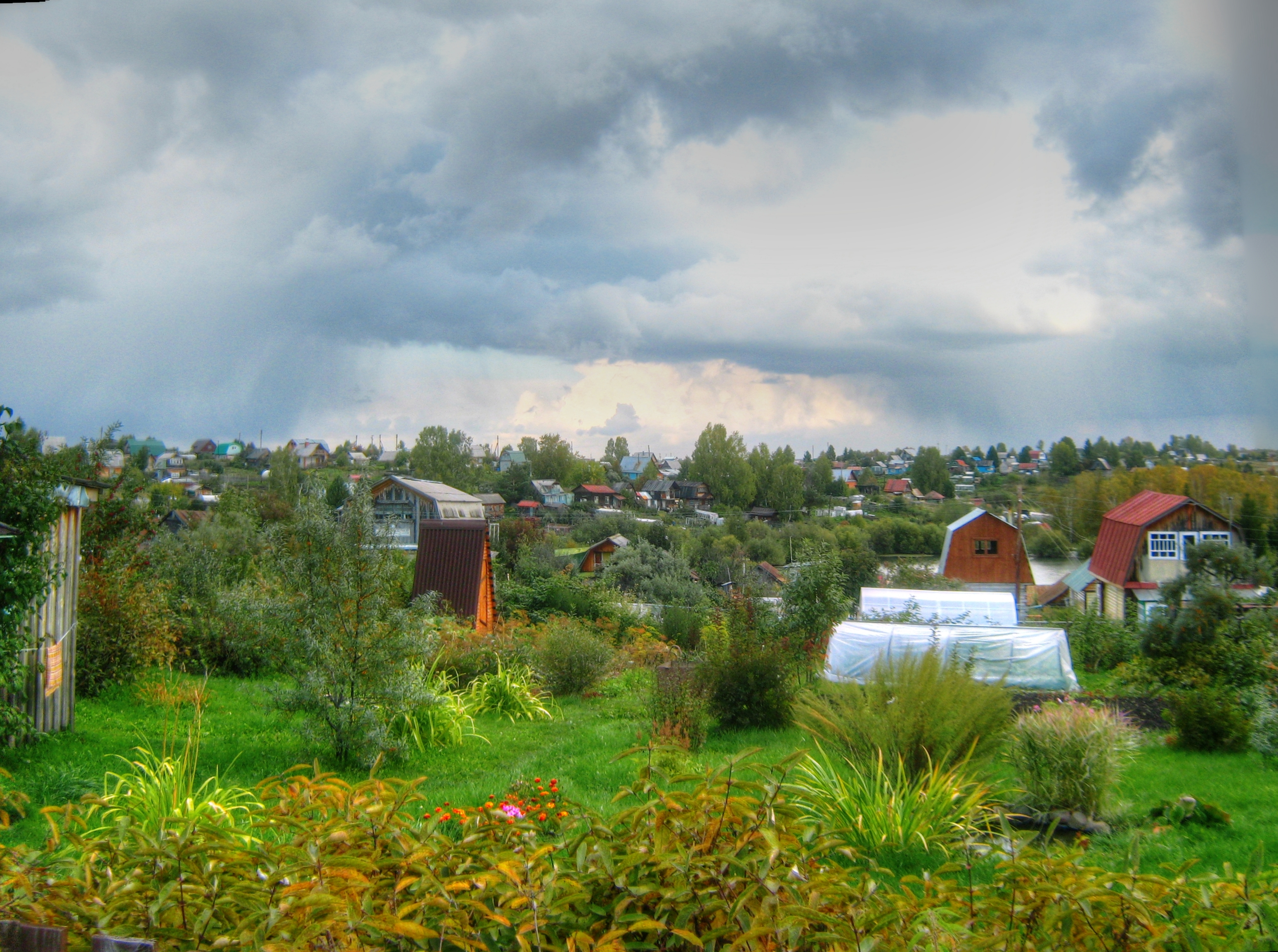
- Dachas, Tomsky District

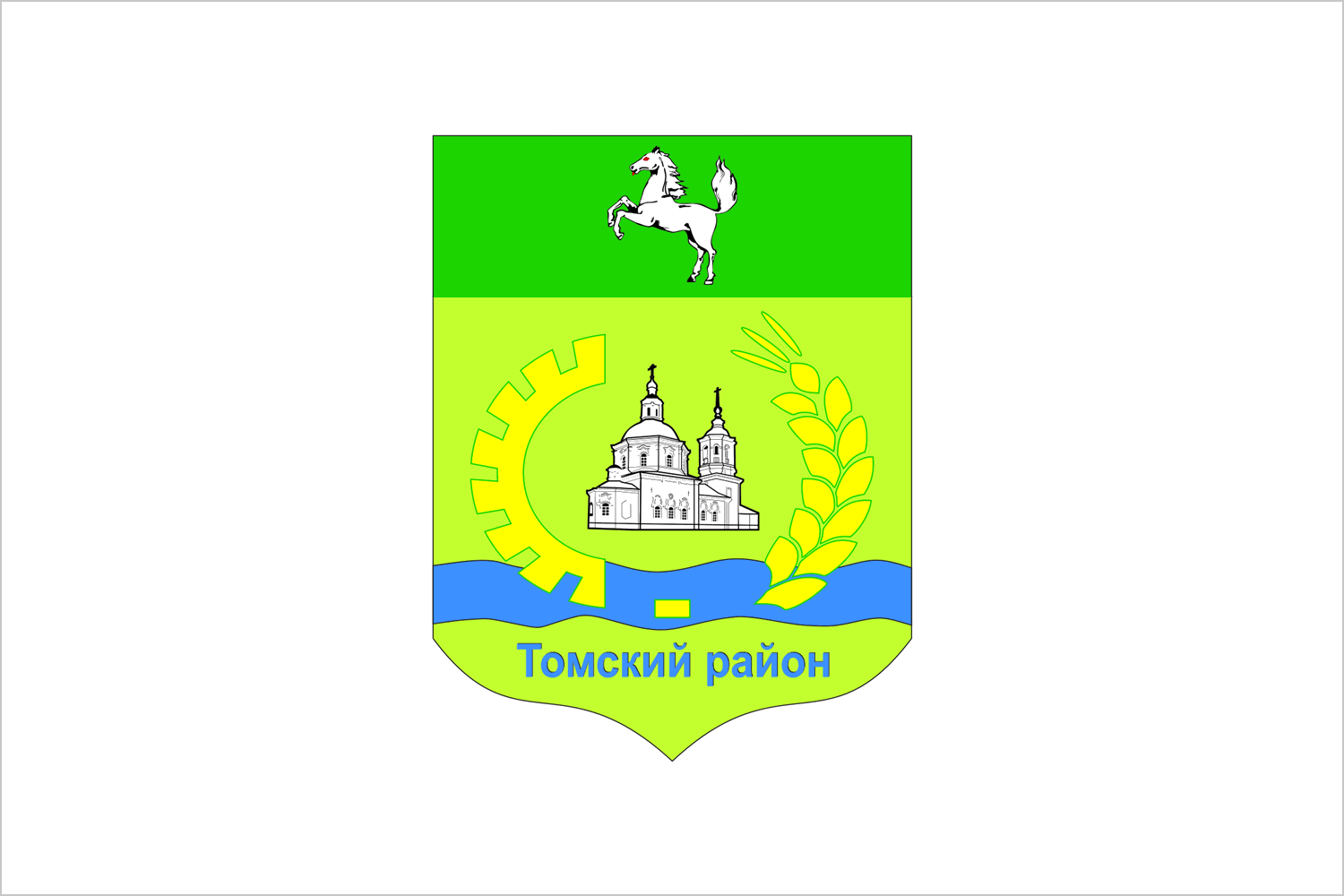
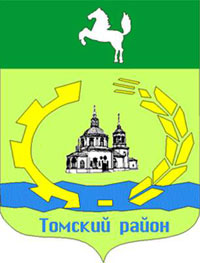
- Flag Coat of arms
- Location of Tomsky District in Tomsk Oblast
- Coordinates: 56°30′N 84°58′E
- Country: Russia
- Federal subject: Tomsk Oblast
- Administrative center: Tomsk

Area
  - Total: 10,064.2 km^{2} (3,885.8 sq mi)

Population (2010 Census)
  - Total: 68,652
  - Density: 6.8214/km^{2} (17.667/sq mi)
  - Urban: 0%
  - Rural: 100%

Administrative structure
  - Inhabited localities: 128 rural localities

Municipal structure
  - Municipally incorporated as: Tomsky Municipal District
  - Municipal divisions: 0 urban settlements, 19 rural settlements
- Time zone: UTC+7 (MSK+4)
- OKTMO ID: 69654000
- Website: http://www.tradm.ru/

Tomsky District (Russian: То́мский райо́н) is an administrative and municipal district (raion), one of the sixteen in Tomsk Oblast, Russia. It is located in the southeast of the oblast. The area of the district is 10,064.2 square kilometers (3,885.8 sq mi). Its administrative center is the city of Tomsk (which is not administratively a part of the district). Population: 68,652 (2010 Census); 85,888 (2002 census); 92,340 (1989 Soviet census).

== Administrative and municipal status ==
Within the framework of administrative divisions, Tomsky District is one of the sixteen in the oblast. The city of Tomsk serves as its administrative center, despite being incorporated separately as a city under oblast jurisdiction—an administrative unit with the status equal to that of the districts.

As a municipal division, the district is incorporated as Tomsky Municipal District. Tomsk City Under Oblast Jurisdiction is incorporated separately from the district as Tomsk Urban Okrug.
