= Kozhevnikovskaya =

Kozhevnikovskaya Кожевниковская
- Village
- Location within Vologda Oblast Location within Russia
- Coordinates: 60°25′N 43°36′E
- Country: Russia
- Region: Vologda Oblast
- District: Tarnogsky District
- Time zone: UTC+3:00

Kozhevnikovskaya (Russian: Кожевниковская) is a rural locality (a village) in Tarnogskoye Rural Settlement, Tarnogsky District, Vologda Oblast, Russia. The population was 11 as of 2002.

== Geography ==
Kozhevnikovskaya is located 11 km south of Tarnogsky Gorodok (the district's administrative centre) by road. Shebengsky Pogost is the nearest rural locality.
