= Seversk =

Closed city in Tomsk Oblast, Russia

Seversk Северск
- City
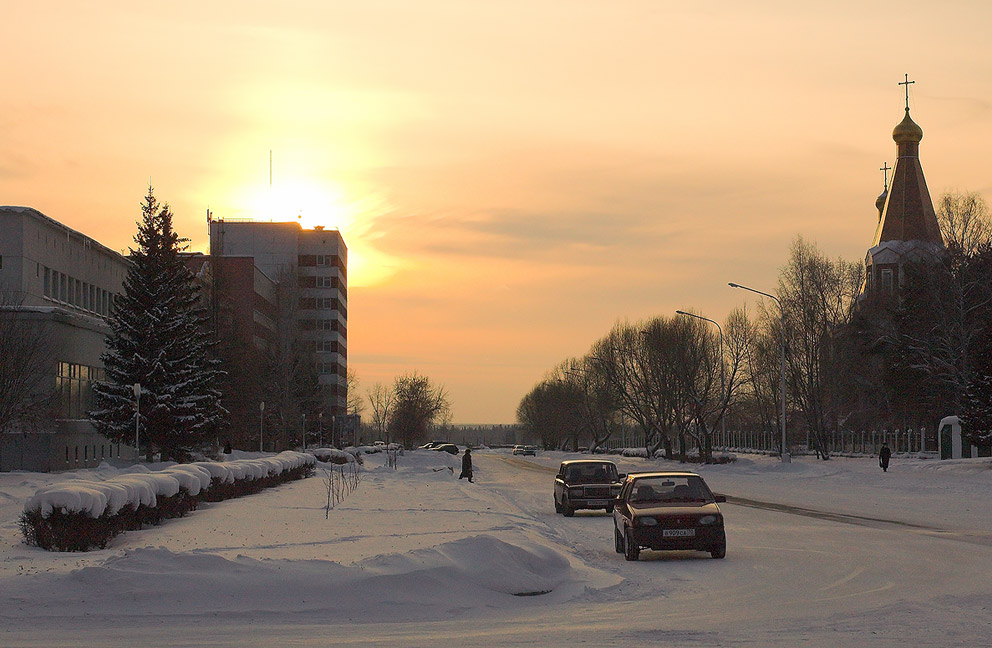
- Kurchatova Street in Seversk

- Flag Coat of arms
- Interactive map of Seversk
- Location of Seversk Seversk (Tomsk Oblast)
- Coordinates: 56°36′N 84°51′E
- Country: Russia
- Federal subject: Tomsk Oblast
- Founded: 1949
- City status since: 1956

Government
  - Mayor: Nikolay Didenko
- Elevation: 90 m (300 ft)

Population (2010 Census)
  - Total: 108,590
  - Estimate (2025): 104,982 (−3.3%)
  - Rank: 149th in 2010

Administrative status
  - Subordinated to: Seversk City Under Oblast Jurisdiction
  - Capital of: Seversk City Under Oblast Jurisdiction

Municipal status
  - Urban okrug: Seversk Urban Okrug
  - Capital of: Seversk Urban Okrug
- Time zone: UTC+7 (MSK+4)
- Postal code: 636000
- Dialing code: +7 3823
- OKTMO ID: 69741000001
- Website: seversknet.ru

Seversk (Russian: Се́верск, IPA: [ˈsʲevʲɪrsk]) is a closed city in Tomsk Oblast, Russia, located 15 kilometers (9.3 mi) northwest of Tomsk on the right bank of the Tom River. The population was 108,590 at the 2010 census and 109,106 at the 2002 census.

It was previously known as Pyaty Pochtovy (until 1949) and Tomsk-7 (until 1992).

== Geography ==
The city is located 15 kilometers (9.3 miles) northwest of Tomsk on the right bank of the Tom River.

=== Climate ===
Seversk has a humid continental climate (Köppen climate classification Dfb) with warm summer. The annual average temperature is 0.6 °C (33.1 °F). The average temperature in January is between −21 and −13 °C (−6 and 9 °F). The average temperature in July is 19.2 °C (66.6 °F). The total annual rainfall is 530 millimeters (21 in).

== History ==
Founded in 1949, it was known as Pyaty Pochtovy (Пя́тый Почто́вый, lit. the Fifth Postal) until 1954 and as Tomsk-7 (Томск-7) until 1992. City status was granted to it in 1956.

== Administrative and municipal status ==
Within the framework of administrative divisions, it is, together with five rural localities, incorporated as Seversk City Under Oblast Jurisdiction—an administrative unit with the status equal to that of the districts. As a municipal division, Seversk City Under Oblast Jurisdiction is incorporated as Seversk Urban Okrug.

== Economy ==
Seversk is the site of the Siberian Chemical Combine, also known as Siberian Group of Chemical Enterprises or SGCE, founded in 1954. It comprises several nuclear reactors and chemical plants for separation, enrichment, and reprocessing of uranium and plutonium. Following an agreement in March 2003 between Russia and the United States to shut down Russia's three remaining plutonium-producing reactors, two of the three plutonium producing reactors (the two that are situated in Seversk, at the Sibirskaya Nuclear Power Plant) were shut down.

Nuclear warheads are produced and stored on the premises. One of the most serious nuclear accidents at SGCE occurred on April 6, 1993, when a tank containing a highly radioactive solution exploded (see § Tomsk-7 explosion).

== Secret city ==
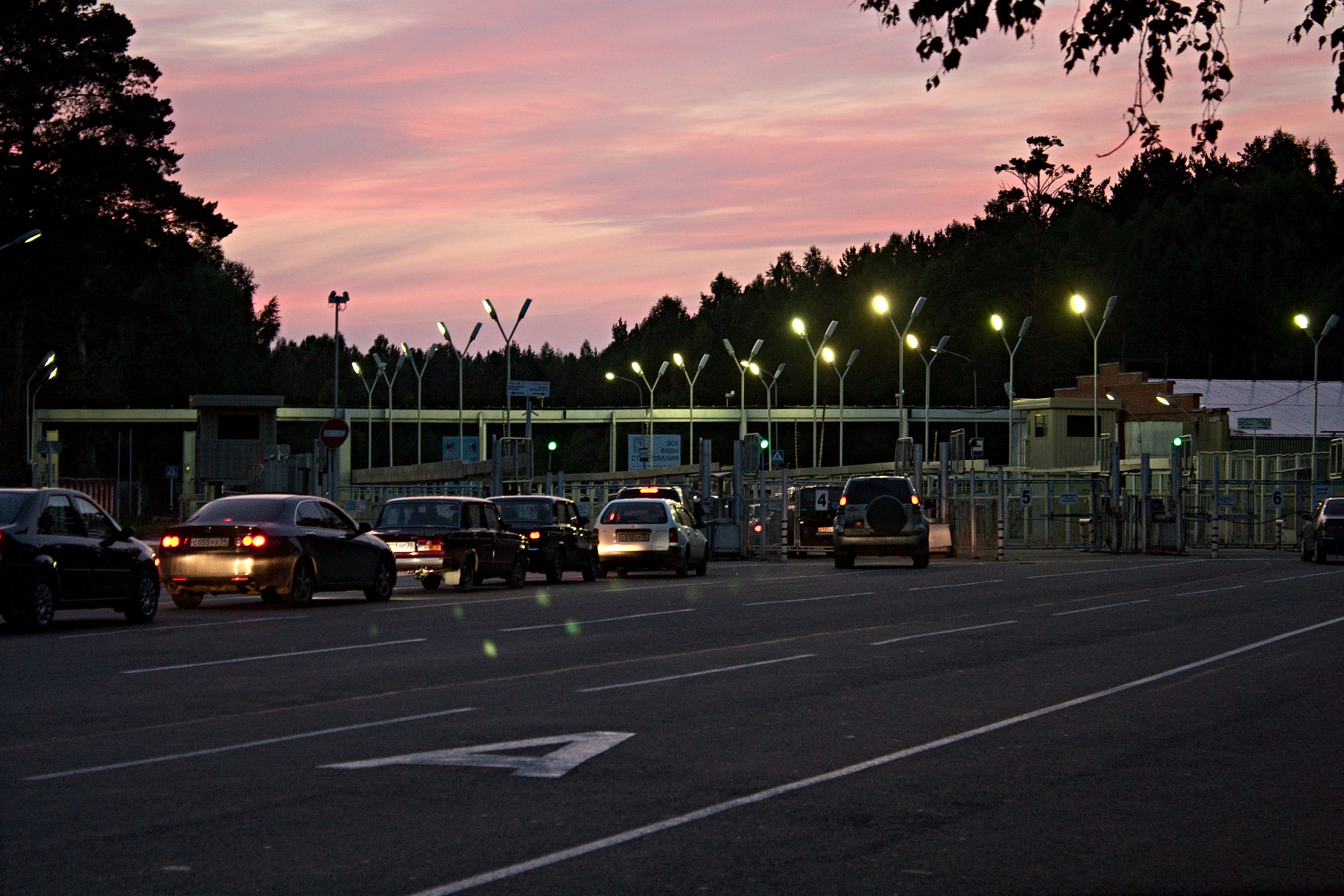
Central entry checkpoint

Seversk had been a secret city in the Soviet Union until President Boris Yeltsin decreed in 1992 that such cities could use their historical names. The town had not been marked on the official maps until then. As was the tradition with Soviet towns containing secret facilities, the designation "Tomsk-7" (like its predecessor "Pyaty Pochtovy") is simply a postal code which implies that the place is located close to the city of Tomsk.

For many years, residents have been restricted from entering or leaving the city. Upon leaving Seversk, residents had to surrender their special entry passes at the checkpoint and it was forbidden to discuss where they worked or lived. In 1987, some restrictions were lifted due to the large number of residents who worked or studied in Tomsk.

The city still remains closed to non-residents. There are six checkpoints where visitors must show entry documents. Permission to visit the city may only be granted by the appropriate authorities by a request of the institution being visited, or by a request of a private party such as a close relative. Visitors can apply for entry passes at the main checkpoint; prior to May 2007, they needed to visit a special office in Tomsk.

== Tomsk-7 explosion ==
There was a nuclear accident at the Tomsk-7 Reprocessing Complex on 6 April 1993, when a tank exploded due to formation of red oil, while nitric acid was being added to a plutonium-uranium mixture. The explosion had a force of approximately 100 kg of TNT and blew out a large section of the exterior wall of the high level radioactive processing room, releasing a cloud of radioactive gas. The cloud was dispersed northwards by the wind, with some of the radioactive material settling over the neighboring village of Georgiyevka.

TIME magazine has identified the Tomsk-7 explosion as one of the world's 10 "worst nuclear disasters". The International Atomic Energy Agency considers the event a Level 3 "serious incident".

== Culture ==
Seversk has nine municipal cultural and artistic institutions, as well as four establishments of additional education for children of artistic and aesthetic focus. There is also a nonprofit organization, Ostrovsky House of Culture, and a cinema called Mir.

== Education ==
There is a major post-secondary school in the city, the Seversk State Technological Academy, a branch of Moscow Engineering Physics Institute.

== Notable people from Seversk ==
- Anastasia Shishmakova (born 2000), Russian group rhythmic gymnast.
- Margarita Aliychuk (born 1990), Russian group rhythmic gymnast and Olympic champion
- Lyubov Yegorova (born 1966), cross-country skier and Olympic champion

== See also ==
- Kyshtym disaster
- List of closed cities
