= Strezhevoy =

Town in Tomsk Oblast, Russia

Strezhevoy Стрежевой
- Town Under Oblast Jurisdiction
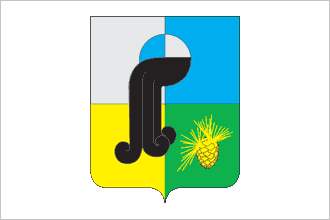
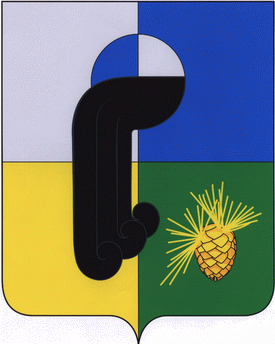
- Flag Coat of arms
- Interactive map of Strezhevoy
- Location of Strezhevoy Strezhevoy (Tomsk Oblast)
- Coordinates: 60°44′N 77°35′E
- Country: Russia
- Federal subject: Tomsk Oblast
- Founded: 1966
- Town status since: 1978
- Elevation: 40 m (130 ft)

Population (2010 Census)
  - Total: 42,219
  - Estimate (2025): 37,165 (−12%)

Administrative status
  - Subordinated to: Strezhevoy Town Under Oblast Jurisdiction
  - Capital of: Strezhevoy Town Under Oblast Jurisdiction

Municipal status
  - Urban okrug: Strezhevoy Urban Okrug
  - Capital of: Strezhevoy Urban Okrug
- Time zone: UTC+7 (MSK+4)
- Postal code: 63678x
- Dialing code: +7 38259
- OKTMO ID: 69710000001
- Website: admstrj.tomsk.ru

Strezhevoy (Russian: Стрежево́й) is a town in Tomsk Oblast, Russia, located on the shores of the Ob River's canal. Population: 42,219 (2010 census); 43,815 (2002 census); 43,348 (1989 Soviet census).

== History ==
It was founded in 1966 as a settlement near the village of Strezhevoy and was granted town status in 1978.

== Administrative and municipal status ==
Within the framework of administrative divisions, it is incorporated as Strezhevoy Town Under Oblast Jurisdiction—an administrative unit with the status equal to that of the districts. As a municipal division, Strezhevoy Town Under Oblast Jurisdiction is incorporated as Strezhevoy Urban Okrug.

== Economy and infrastructure ==
Joint-stock company Tomskneft, a Tomsk-based oil production company controlled by Rosneft, is located in Strezhevoy, and the town grew up around the company's expanding needs. Most of the town's housing and all of its major public amenities were constructed around the company's needs in the 1960s and 1970s.

== Transportation ==
It is served by the Strezhevoy Airport.
