= Molchanovsky District =

Molchanovsky District Молчановский район (Russian)
- District
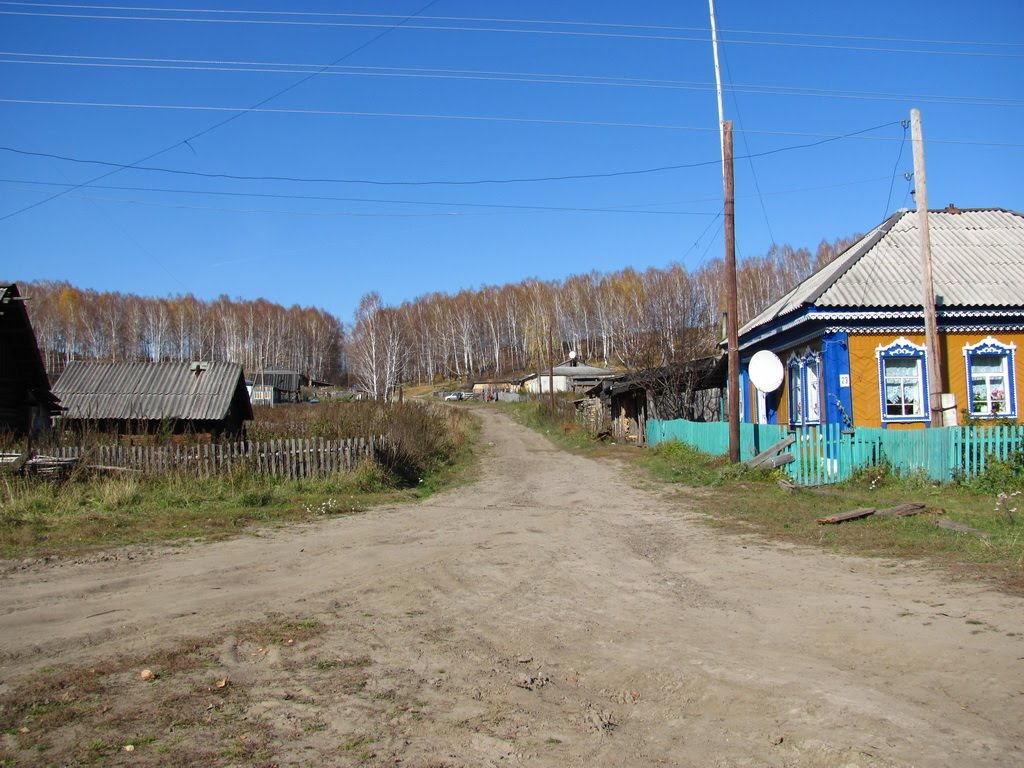
- Sokolovka Street, Molchanovsky District

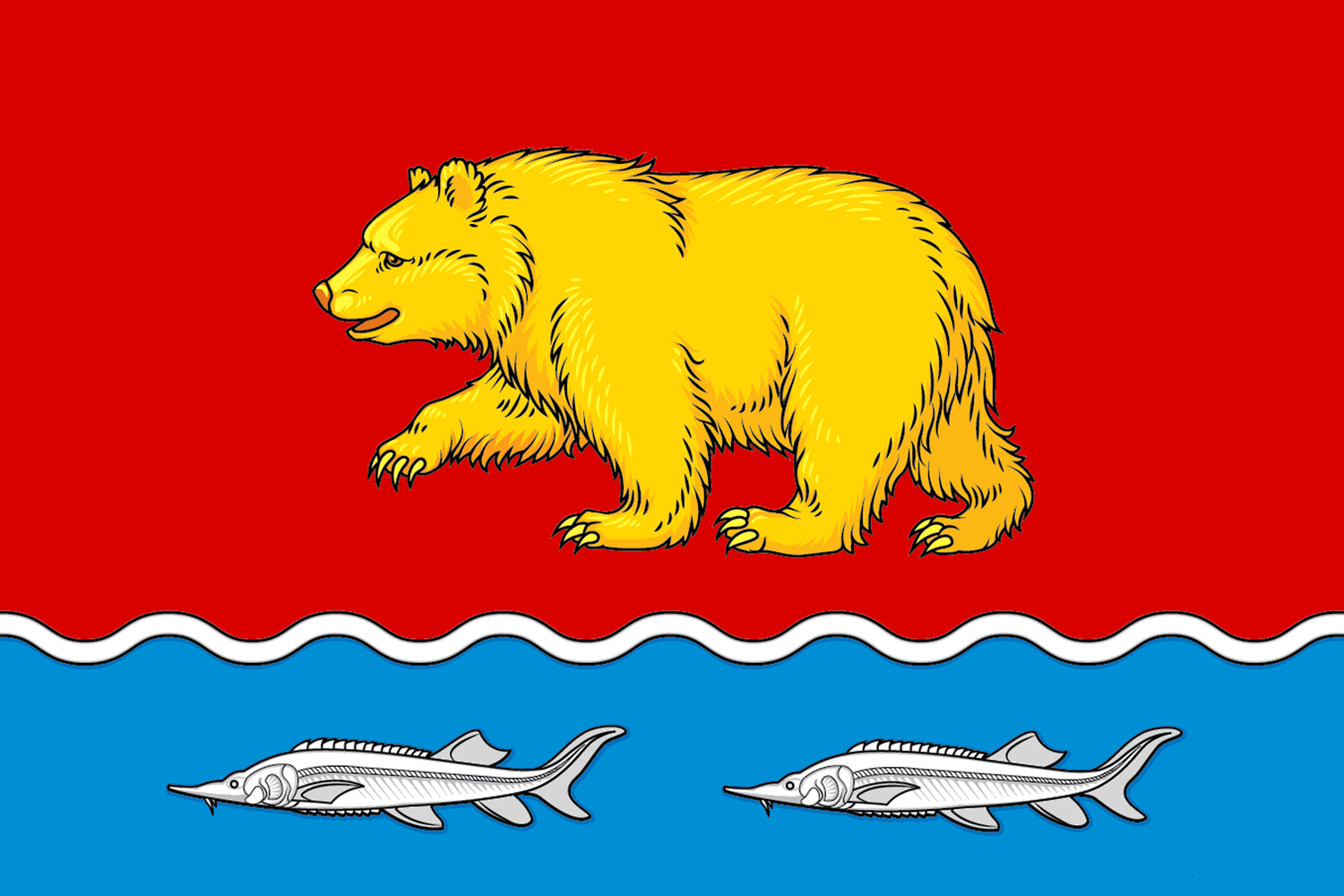
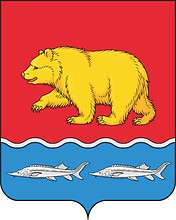
- Flag Coat of arms
- Location of Molchanovsky District in Tomsk Oblast
- Coordinates: 57°35′N 83°46′E
- Country: Russia
- Federal subject: Tomsk Oblast
- Administrative center: Molchanovo

Area
  - Total: 6,351.2 km^{2} (2,452.2 sq mi)

Population (2010 Census)
  - Total: 13,446
  - Density: 2.1171/km^{2} (5.4832/sq mi)
  - Urban: 0%
  - Rural: 100%

Administrative structure
  - Inhabited localities: 19 rural localities

Municipal structure
  - Municipally incorporated as: Molchanovsky Municipal District
  - Municipal divisions: 0 urban settlements, 5 rural settlements
- Time zone: UTC+7 (MSK+4)
- OKTMO ID: 69640000
- Website: http://www.molchanovo.ru

Molchanovsky District (Russian: Молча́новский райо́н, Selkup: Малчанвэл аймак) is an administrative and municipal district (raion), one of the sixteen in Tomsk Oblast, Russia. It is located in the eastern central part of the oblast. The area of the district is 6,351.2 square kilometers (2,452.2 sq mi). Its administrative center is the rural locality (a selo) of Molchanovo. Population: 13,446 (2010 Census); 15,591 (2002 census); 19,217 (1989 Soviet census). The population of Molchanovo accounts for 42.7% of the district's total population.
