= Bakcharsky District =

Bakcharsky District Бакчарский район (Russian)
- District
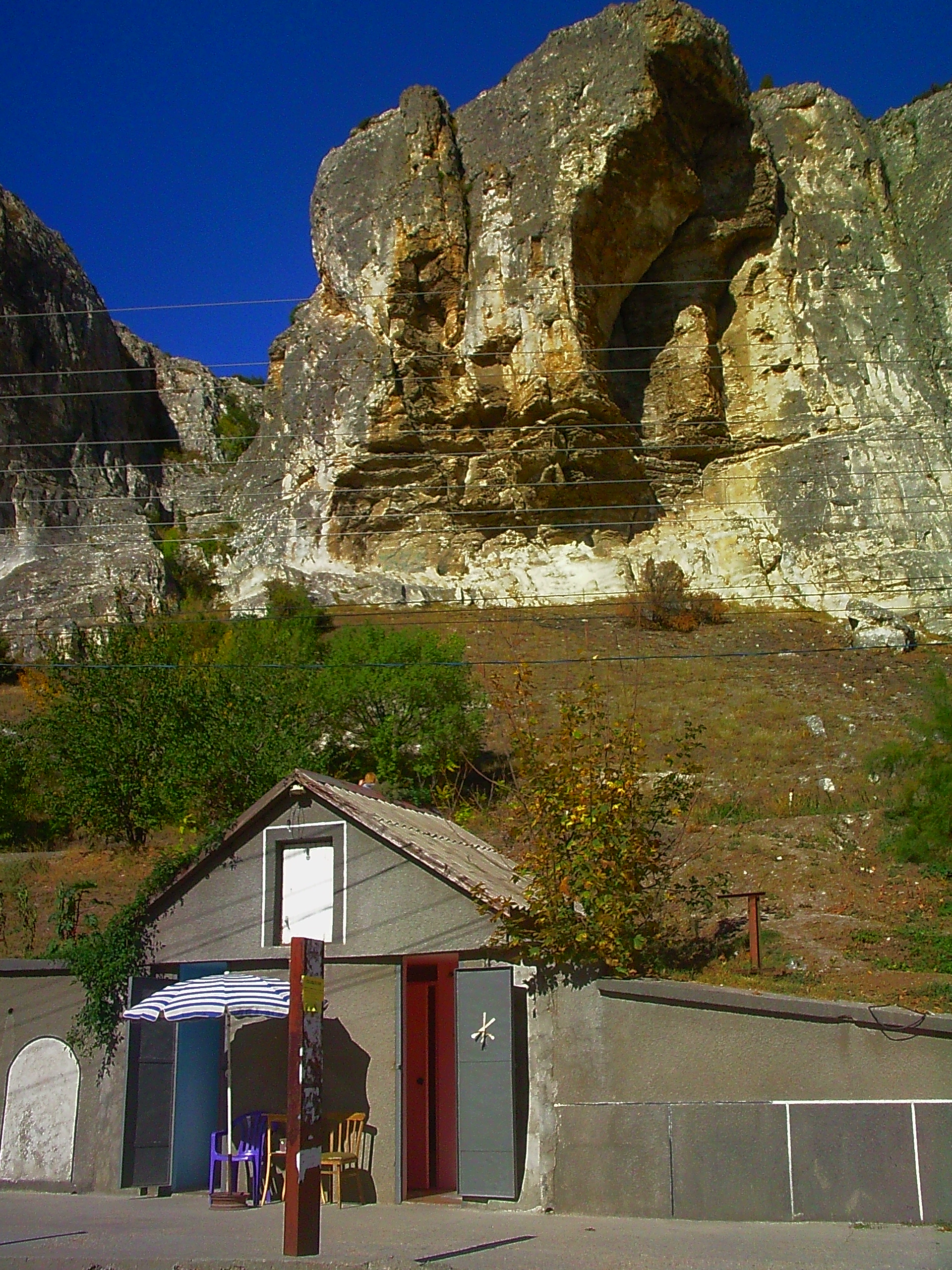
- Raisobes Building, Bakcharsky District

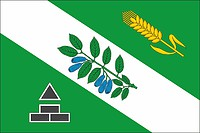
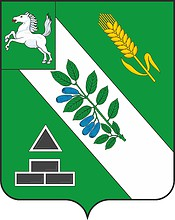
- Flag Coat of arms
- Location of Bakcharsky District in Tomsk Oblast
- Coordinates: 57°01′N 82°04′E
- Country: Russia
- Federal subject: Tomsk Oblast
- Administrative center: Bakchar

Area
  - Total: 24,700 km^{2} (9,500 sq mi)

Population (2010 Census)
  - Total: 13,419
  - Density: 0.543/km^{2} (1.41/sq mi)
  - Urban: 0%
  - Rural: 100%

Administrative structure
  - Inhabited localities: 24 rural localities

Municipal structure
  - Municipally incorporated as: Bakcharsky Municipal District
  - Municipal divisions: 0 urban settlements, 6 rural settlements
- Time zone: UTC+7 (MSK+4)
- OKTMO ID: 69612000
- Website: http://bakchar.tomsk.ru

Bakcharsky District (Russian: Бакча́рский райо́н) is an administrative and municipal district (raion), one of the sixteen in Tomsk Oblast, Russia. It is located in the south of the oblast. The area of the district is 24,700 square kilometers (9,500 sq mi). Its administrative center is the rural locality (a selo) of Bakchar. Population: 13,419 (2010 Census); 15,963 (2002 census); 17,879 (1989 Soviet census). The population of Bakchar accounts for 45.7% of the district's total population.
