= Kedrovy, Tomsk Oblast =

Town in Tomsk Oblast, Russia

Kedrovy Кедровый
- Town Under Oblast Jurisdiction
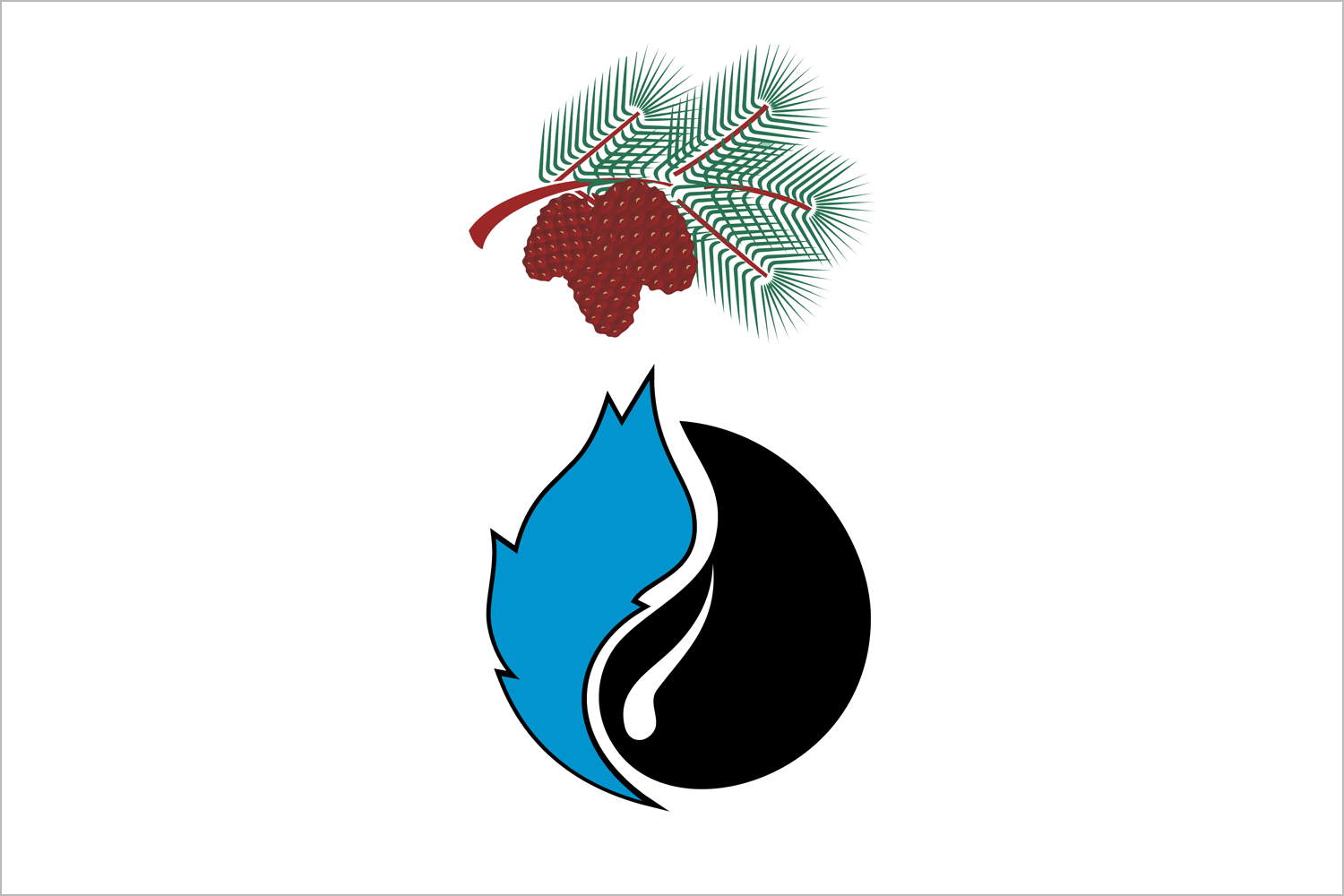
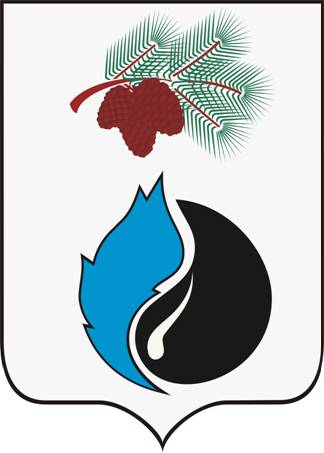
- Flag Coat of arms
- Interactive map of Kedrovy
- Location of Kedrovy Kedrovy (Tomsk Oblast)
- Coordinates: 57°34′N 79°34′E
- Country: Russia
- Federal subject: Tomsk Oblast
- Founded: 1982
- Town status since: 1987
- Elevation: 100 m (330 ft)

Population (2010 Census)
  - Total: 2,451
  - Estimate (2021): 1,818 (−25.8%)

Administrative status
  - Subordinated to: Kedrovy Town Under Oblast Jurisdiction
  - Capital of: Kedrovy Town Under Oblast Jurisdiction

Municipal status
  - Urban okrug: Kedrovy Urban Okrug
  - Capital of: Kedrovy Urban Okrug
- Time zone: UTC+7 (MSK+4)
- Postal code: 636615
- Dialing code: +7 38250
- OKTMO ID: 69707000001
- Website: kedradm.tomsk.ru

Kedrovy (Russian: Кедро́вый) is a town in Tomsk Oblast, Russia, situated in the valley of the Chusik River (Ob's basin). Population: 2,451 (2010 census); 3,052 (2002 Census); 1,998 (1989 Soviet census).

== History ==
It was founded in 1982 and granted town status in 1987.

== Administrative and municipal status ==
Within the framework of administrative divisions, it is, together with six rural localities, incorporated as Kedrovy Town Under Oblast Jurisdiction—an administrative unit with the status equal to that of the districts. As a municipal division, Kedrovy Town Under Oblast Jurisdiction is incorporated as Kedrovy Urban Okrug.

== Transportation ==
There is an airport in the town.
