= Kozhevnikovsky District =

Kozhevnikovsky District Кожевниковский район (Russian)
- District
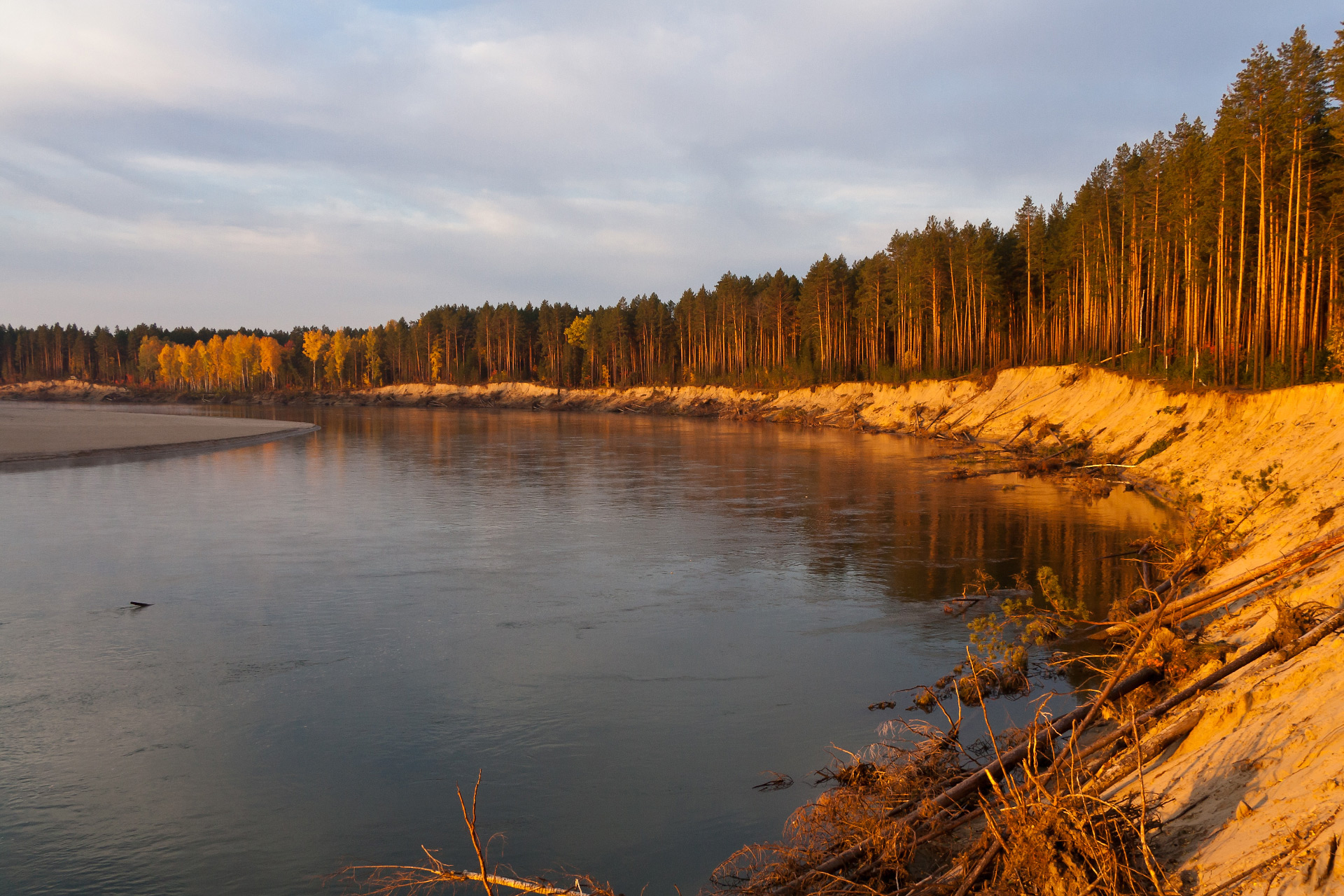
- Simansky Forest, Kozhevnikovsky District

- Coat of arms
- Location of Kozhevnikovsky District in Tomsk Oblast
- Coordinates: 56°15′N 83°58′E
- Country: Russia
- Federal subject: Tomsk Oblast
- Administrative center: Kozhevnikovo

Area
  - Total: 3,907.5 km^{2} (1,508.7 sq mi)

Population (2010 Census)
  - Total: 20,967
  - Density: 5.3658/km^{2} (13.897/sq mi)
  - Urban: 0%
  - Rural: 100%

Administrative structure
  - Inhabited localities: 38 rural localities

Municipal structure
  - Municipally incorporated as: Kozhevnikovsky Municipal District
  - Municipal divisions: 0 urban settlements, 8 rural settlements
- Time zone: UTC+7 (MSK+4)
- OKTMO ID: 69628000
- Website: http://www.kog.tomskinvest.ru/

Kozhevnikovsky District (Russian: Коже́вниковский райо́н) is an administrative and municipal district (raion), one of the sixteen in Tomsk Oblast, Russia. It is located in the southeast of the oblast. The area of the district is 3,907.5 square kilometers (1,508.7 sq mi). Its administrative center is the rural locality (a selo) of Kozhevnikovo. Population: 20,967 (2010 Census); 22,582 (2002 census); 24,535 (1989 Soviet census). The population of Kozhevnikovo accounts for 39.0% of the district's total population.
