= Tomsk Oblast =

First-level administrative division of Russia

Tomsk Oblast Томская область (Russian)
- Oblast
- Flag Coat of arms

- Coordinates: 58°45′N 82°08′E
- Country: Russia
- Federal district: Siberian
- Economic region: West Siberian
- Established: August 13, 1944
- Administrative center: Tomsk

Government
  - Body: Legislative Duma
  - Governor: Vladimir Mazur

Area
  - Total: 314,391 km^{2} (121,387 sq mi)
  - Rank: 16th

Population (2021 census)
  - Total: 1,062,666
  - Estimate (2018): 1,078,280
  - Rank: 47th
  - Density: 3.38008/km^{2} (8.75436/sq mi)
  - Urban: 71.3%
  - Rural: 28.7%

GDP (nominal, 2024)
  - Total: ₽912 billion (US$10.7 billion)
  - Per capita: ₽870,869 (US$10,218.95)
- Time zone: UTC+7 (MSK+4)
- ISO 3166 code: RU-TOM
- License plates: 70
- OKTMO ID: 69000000
- Official languages: Russian
- Website: http://www.tomsk.gov.ru/

Tomsk Oblast (Russian: То́мская о́бласть, romanized: Tomskaya oblastʹ) is a federal subject of Russia (an oblast). It lies in the southeastern West Siberian Plain, in the southwest of the Siberian Federal District. Its administrative center is the city of Tomsk. Population: 1,047,394 (2010 Census).

The development of the territory which now constitutes the oblast began in the early 17th century. Tomsk itself was founded in 1604. Some of the oblast's 316,900 square kilometers (122,400 sq mi) territory is inaccessible because it is covered with taiga woods and swamps. Tomsk oblast contains Vasyugan Swamp, the biggest swamp in the northern hemisphere. The oblast borders with Krasnoyarsk Krai and Tyumen, Omsk, Novosibirsk, and Kemerovo Oblasts.

== Administrative divisions ==
The oblast is directly divided into four cities and sixteen districts. The four administrative cities are the administrative center of Tomsk, Kedrovy, Strezhevoy, and the closed city of Seversk.

== Geography ==
Tomsk Oblast, part of the wider region of Siberia, is almost entirely taiga. Approximately 85% of the oblast is forested, with Siberian pines, Scots pines, spruce, fir, and larch trees being some of the common trees in the area. Major rivers which pass through the oblast include the Ob, Tom, Chulym, Chaya, Ket, Parabel, Vasyugan, and the Tym.

=== Climate ===
The average annual temperature in Tomsk Oblast is 1.75 °C, with the average temperature in July being 19.4 °C, and the average temperature in January being approximately -19-21 °C. The frost-free season typically lasts 100–105 days. Mean annual precipitation in the oblast is 435 millimeters.

== History ==
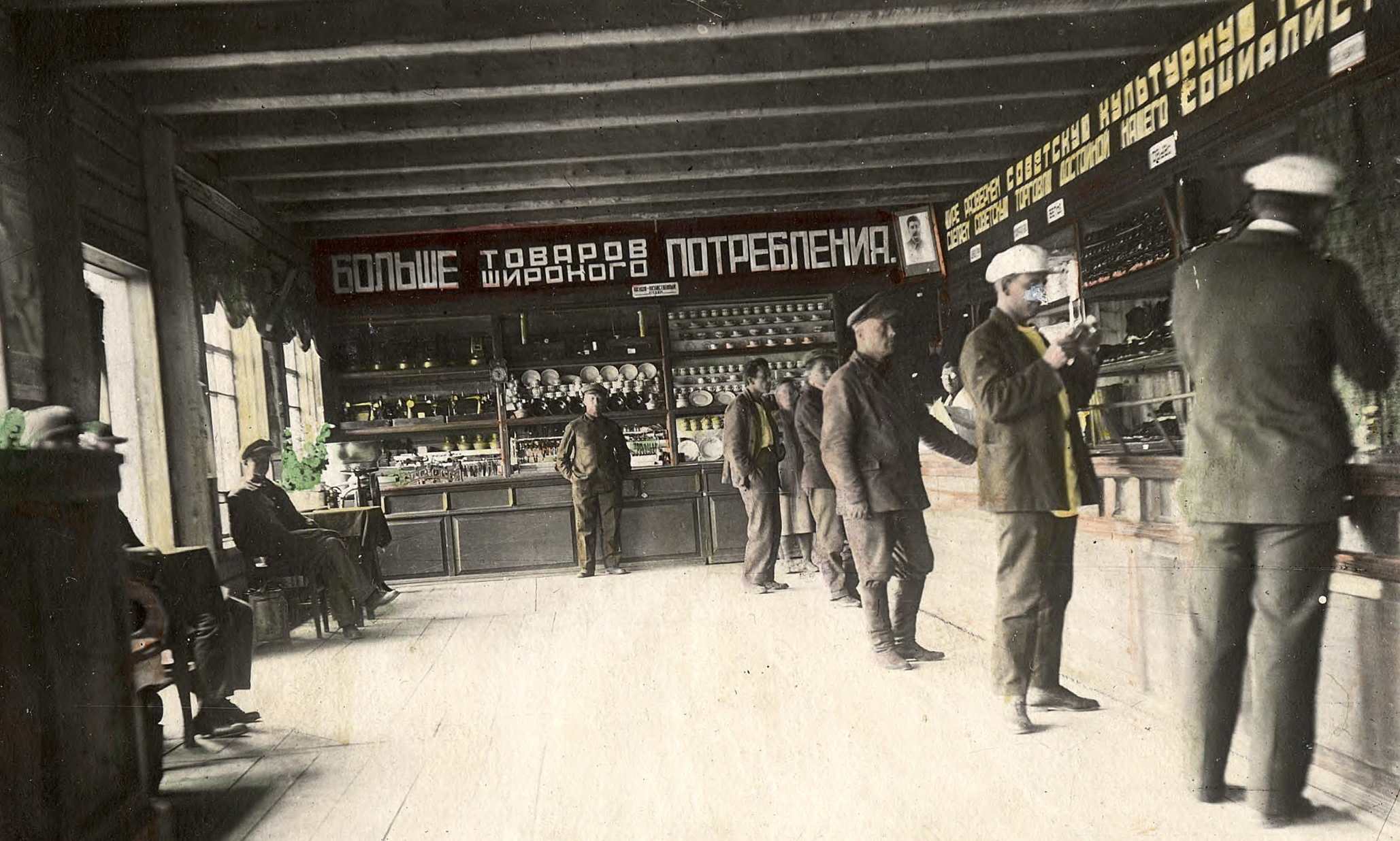
A department store in Bakchar, Tomsk Oblast in the 1930s

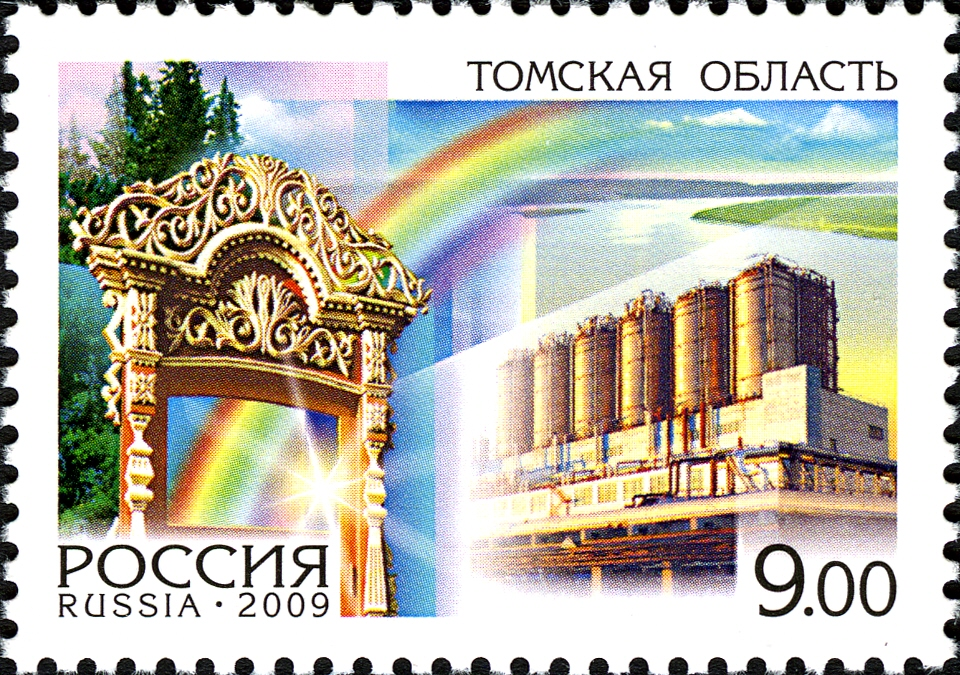
Postage stamp depicting the oblast, issued in 2009

Long before Siberia became part of Russia, the territory of modern Tomsk Oblast was inhabited by people belonging to the taiga Kulayskoy civilization known for its bronze artifacts.

The development of the region began at the end of the 16th and early 17th centuries. The oldest settlement in the area is the village (former city) Narym, founded in 1596.

The administrative center of the province, the city of Tomsk, was founded in 1604 by a decree of Tsar Boris Godunov. From 1719 to 1804 in the province of Tobolsk. In 1782, it was formed by Tomskaya oblast in the composition of Tobolsky Namestnichestva (from 1796 - Tobolskaya guberniya). In 1804 the Tomsk Governorate was founded, which existed until 1925, when it became part of the Siberian region (since 1930 - the West Siberian region). Tomsk Oblast was re-established on August 13, 1944. The city grew throughout the mid-20th century due to the migration of many Soviet institutions to Tomsk during World War II, the development of nuclear facilities in the region during the 1950s, as well as the beginning of petroleum production in the oblast during the 1960s and 1970s.

On July 26, 1995 the Oblast's charter was adopted.

== Politics ==
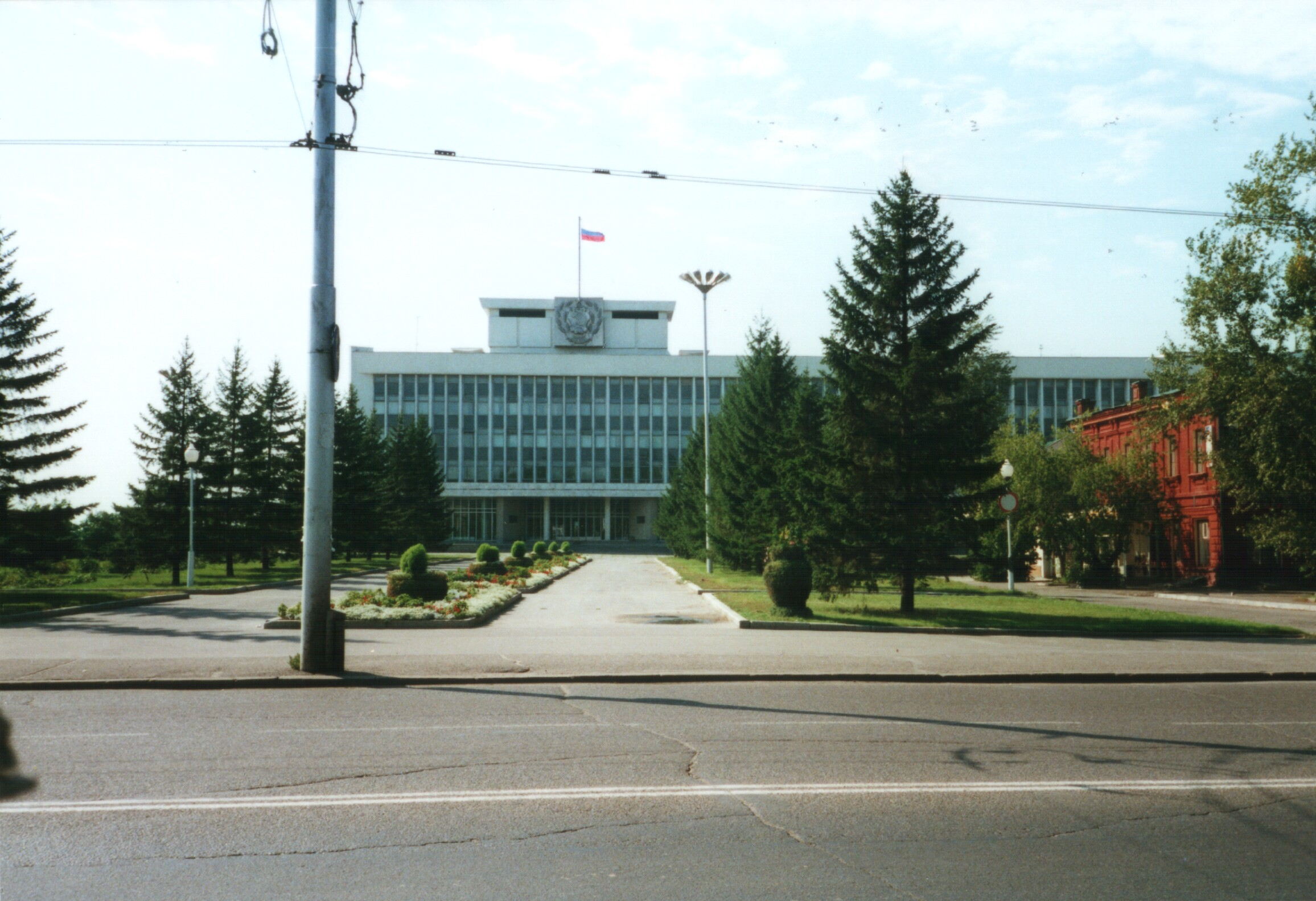
Oblast Administration building in Tomsk, 2000

During the Soviet period, the high authority in the oblast was shared between three persons: The first secretary of the Tomsk CPSU Committee (who in reality had the biggest authority), the chairman of the oblast Soviet (legislative power), and the Chairman of the oblast Executive Committee (executive power). After the abolition of Article 6 of the Constitution of the USSR in March 1990, the CPSU lost its monopoly on power. The head of the Oblast administration, and eventually the governor was appointed/elected alongside elected regional parliament.

The Charter of Tomsk Oblast is the fundamental law of the region. The Legislative Duma of Tomsk Oblast is the province's standing legislative (representative) body. The Legislative Duma exercises its authority by passing laws, resolutions, and other legal acts and by supervising the implementation and observance of the laws and other legal acts passed by it. The highest executive body is the Oblast Government, which includes territorial executive bodies such as district administrations, committees, and commissions that facilitate development and run the day to day matters of the province. The Oblast administration supports the activities of the Governor who is the highest official and acts as guarantor of the observance of the oblast Charter in accordance with the Constitution of Russia.

The current Governor of the Tomsk Oblast is Vladimir Mazur. The Legislative Duma of the Tomsk Region consists of 42 deputies, and the current chairman is Oksana Kozlovskaya.

The deputies of the Duma of the Tomsk Oblast of the VI convocation (2016–2021) formed the following deputy associations:

- United Russia faction (27 deputies);
- Communist Party of the Russian Federation faction (4 deputies);
- Liberal Democratic Party of Russia faction (9 deputies);
- A Just Russia faction (2 deputies).

== Economy ==
Tomsk Oblast is rich in natural resources such as oil, natural gas, ferrous and non-ferrous metals, peat, and various types of waters. Forests are also among the most significant assets of the oblast: about 20% of the West Siberian forest resources are located in Tomsk Oblast. Industry makes up about half of the regional GDP, while agriculture contributes 19% and construction 13%. Chemical and oil industries are the most developed in the region, followed by machine construction. The oblast's major export items are: oil (62.1%), methanol (30.2%), and machines and equipment (4.8%). Oil extraction and lumbering are the major business of the region's joint ventures.

=== Transportation ===
==== Air transport ====
The oblast's main aviation center is the Tomsk Airport, which is served by a number of national airlines. The airport was remodeled in April 2013 for the purpose of being capable of handling international flights.

==== Rail transport ====
6 railway routes pass through the oblast, totaling 346 kilometers in length. Direct rail routes from the oblast span from Adler to Vladivostok.

==== Road transport ====
Tomsk Oblast has 4,204 kilometers of hard-surface road, as of 2015. The Russian government has outlined a plan to link up the oblast's disconnected road systems with the rest of the national road network by 2030.

== Demographics ==
Historical population
Year	Pop.	±%
1959	746,802	—
1970	785,706	+5.2%
1979	865,934	+10.2%
1989	1,001,613	+15.7%
2002	1,046,039	+4.4%
2010	1,047,394	+0.1%
2021	1,062,666	+1.5%
Source: Census data

Population: 1,062,666 (2021 census); 1,047,394 (2010 census); 1,046,039 (2002 census); 1,001,613 (1989 Soviet census).

Major ethnic groups living in the oblast are Russians (92.1%), Ukrainian-Belarusian (1.4%), Volga-Ural-Siberian Tatars (1.7%) and Volga Germans (0.9%). Slavs, Finns and Volga Germans make up more than 94.4% of the population, while Tatars, Chuvash, Armenians and Khanty make up the remaining part. Additionally, 45,016 people were registered from administrative databases, and could not declare an ethnicity. It is estimated that the proportion of ethnicities in this group is the same as that of the declared group.

After the disastrous situation during the 1990s, the demography of Tomsk Oblast is starting to stabilize. During the first three months of 2009, there were 3,337 births (2.4% higher than that of 2008) and 3,339 deaths (6.7% less than that of 2008).

Vital statistics for 2024:

- Births: 7,586 (7.3 per 1,000)
- Deaths: 12,773 (12.3 per 1,000)

Total fertility rate (2024):
1.16 children per woman

Life expectancy (2021):
Total — 69.70 years (male — 65.03, female — 74.36)

=== Religion ===
Religion in Tomsk Oblast as of 2012 (Sreda Arena Atlas)
Russian Orthodoxy	33.3%
Other Orthodox	2.2%
Other Christians	5.2%
Islam	1.1%
Buddhism	0.6%
Rodnovery and other native faiths	1.7%
Spiritual but not religious	29.3%
Atheism and irreligion	15.1%
Other and undeclared	11.5%

According to a 2012 survey 33.3% of the population of Tomsk Oblast adheres to the Russian Orthodox Church, 4% are unaffiliated generic Christians, 2% is an Eastern Orthodox Christian believer without belonging to any church or is a member of other Eastern Orthodox churches, 1% adheres to the Slavic native faith (Rodnovery) or local indigenous Siberian folk religions, 1% adheres to Islam, 0.62% to Tibetan Buddhism, and 0.4% to the Catholic Church. In addition, 29% of the population declares to be "spiritual but not religious", 15% is atheist, and 13.68% follows other religions or did not give an answer to the question.

=== Education ===
The oblast is home to six state higher education institutions and 47 research institutes. The first university in Asian Russia, Tomsk State University, was founded in 1888. Twelve years later, the first technological institute in Asian Russia, Tomsk Polytechnic University, was founded. Two years after that, in 1902, the first normal university in Asian Russia, Tomsk State Pedagogical University, was founded. Since then city often dubbed the "Siberian Athens" for its unique spirit. Today, more than 100,000 people (or 20 per cent of population of the city) study in Tomsk universities and colleges. In terms of the number of students per 10,000 people Tomsk is ranked third after Moscow and Saint-Petersburg. Tomsk Region is also ranked first in Russia in terms of the number of people engaged in R&D per capita with 160 researchers per 10,000 citizens.

== See also ==
- Administrative divisions of Tomsk Oblast
