= Mikhaylovka, Russia =

Mikhaylovka (Russian: Михайловка) is the name of several inhabited localities in Russia.

== Modern localities ==
=== Altai Krai ===
As of 2012, nine rural localities in Altai Krai bear this name:

- Mikhaylovka, Blagoveshchensky District, Altai Krai, a settlement in Shimolinsky Selsoviet of Blagoveshchensky District; 53°2′N 79°57′E
- Mikhaylovka, Burlinsky District, Altai Krai, a selo in Mikhaylovsky Selsoviet of Burlinsky District; 53°14′N 78°10′E
- Mikhaylovka, Kamensky District, Altai Krai, a settlement in Verkh-Allaksky Selsoviet of Kamensky District; 53°55′N 81°46′E
- Mikhaylovka, Kuryinsky District, Altai Krai, a selo in Ust-Talovsky Selsoviet of Kuryinsky District; 51°29′N 82°9′E
- Mikhaylovka, Smolensky District, Altai Krai, a selo in Kirovsky Selsoviet of Smolensky District; 52°17′N 85°3′E
- Mikhaylovka, Suyetsky District, Altai Krai, a settlement in Boronsky Selsoviet of Suyetsky District; 53°11′N 80°13′E
- Mikhaylovka, Topchikhinsky District, Altai Krai, a selo in Makaryevsky Selsoviet of Topchikhinsky District; 52°51′N 83°3′E
- Mikhaylovka, Tretyakovsky District, Altai Krai, a selo in Tretyakovsky Selsoviet of Tretyakovsky District; 50°49′N 81°58′E
- Mikhaylovka, Ust-Kalmansky District, Altai Krai, a selo in Mikhaylovsky Selsoviet of Ust-Kalmansky District; 51°57′N 83°47′E

=== Amur Oblast ===
As of 2012, four rural localities in Amur Oblast bear this name:

- Mikhaylovka, Arkharinsky District, Amur Oblast, a selo in Leninsky Rural Settlement of Arkharinsky District
- Mikhaylovka, Blagoveshchensky District, Amur Oblast, a selo in Mikhaylovsky Rural Settlement of Blagoveshchensky District
- Mikhaylovka, Mazanovsky District, Amur Oblast, a selo in Krasnoyarovsky Rural Settlement of Mazanovsky District
- Mikhaylovka, Mikhaylovsky District, Amur Oblast, a selo in Mikhaylovsky Rural Settlement of Mikhaylovsky District

=== Arkhangelsk Oblast ===
As of 2012, one rural locality in Arkhangelsk Oblast bears this name:

- Mikhaylovka, Arkhangelsk Oblast, a village in Lipovsky Selsoviet of Velsky District

=== Astrakhan Oblast ===
As of 2012, three rural localities in Astrakhan Oblast bear this name:

- Mikhaylovka, Kharabalinsky District, Astrakhan Oblast, a selo in Mikhaylovsky Selsoviet of Kharabalinsky District; 47°39′N 46°52′E
- Mikhaylovka, Limansky District, Astrakhan Oblast, a selo in Mikhaylovsky Selsoviet of Limansky District; 45°55′N 47°7′E
- Mikhaylovka, Yenotayevsky District, Astrakhan Oblast, a selo in Fedorovsky Selsoviet of Yenotayevsky District; 47°23′N 46°51′E

=== Republic of Bashkortostan ===
As of 2012, twenty-seven rural localities in the Republic of Bashkortostan bear this name:

- Mikhaylovka, Abzelilovsky District, Republic of Bashkortostan, a selo in Tashtimerovsky Selsoviet of Abzelilovsky District
- Mikhaylovka, Abdrashitovsky Selsoviet, Alsheyevsky District, Republic of Bashkortostan, a village in Abdrashitovsky Selsoviet of Alsheyevsky District
- Mikhaylovka, Karmyshevsky Selsoviet, Alsheyevsky District, Republic of Bashkortostan, a selo in Karmyshevsky Selsoviet of Alsheyevsky District
- Mikhaylovka, Arkhangelsky District, Republic of Bashkortostan, a village in Inzersky Selsoviet of Arkhangelsky District
- Mikhaylovka, Askinsky District, Republic of Bashkortostan, a selo in Kazanchinsky Selsoviet of Askinsky District
- Mikhaylovka, Aurgazinsky District, Republic of Bashkortostan, a village in Mikhaylovsky Selsoviet of Aurgazinsky District
- Mikhaylovka, Diyashevsky Selsoviet, Bakalinsky District, Republic of Bashkortostan, a selo in Diyashevsky Selsoviet of Bakalinsky District
- Mikhaylovka, Mikhaylovsky Selsoviet, Bakalinsky District, Republic of Bashkortostan, a selo in Mikhaylovsky Selsoviet of Bakalinsky District
- Mikhaylovka, Bizhbulyaksky District, Republic of Bashkortostan, a selo in Mikhaylovsky Selsoviet of Bizhbulyaksky District
- Mikhaylovka, Blagoveshchensky District, Republic of Bashkortostan, a village in Novonadezhdinsky Selsoviet of Blagoveshchensky District
- Mikhaylovka, Buzdyaksky District, Republic of Bashkortostan, a selo in Gafuriysky Selsoviet of Buzdyaksky District
- Mikhaylovka, Davlekanovsky District, Republic of Bashkortostan, a khutor in Polyakovsky Selsoviet of Davlekanovsky District
- Mikhaylovka, Duvansky District, Republic of Bashkortostan, a selo in Mikhaylovsky Selsoviet of Duvansky District
- Mikhaylovka, Fyodorovsky District, Republic of Bashkortostan, a selo in Mikhaylovsky Selsoviet of Fyodorovsky District
- Mikhaylovka, Gafuriysky District, Republic of Bashkortostan, a selo in Beloozersky Selsoviet of Gafuriysky District
- Mikhaylovka, Iglinsky District, Republic of Bashkortostan, a village in Krasnovoskhodsky Selsoviet of Iglinsky District
- Mikhaylovka, Skvorchikhinsky Selsoviet, Ishimbaysky District, Republic of Bashkortostan, a village in Skvorchikhinsky Selsoviet of Ishimbaysky District
- Mikhaylovka, Yanurusovsky Selsoviet, Ishimbaysky District, Republic of Bashkortostan, a village in Yanurusovsky Selsoviet of Ishimbaysky District
- Mikhaylovka, Karmaskalinsky District, Republic of Bashkortostan, a village in Karlamansky Selsoviet of Karmaskalinsky District
- Mikhaylovka, Khaybullinsky District, Republic of Bashkortostan, a selo in Ivanovsky Selsoviet of Khaybullinsky District
- Mikhaylovka, Kuyurgazinsky District, Republic of Bashkortostan, a village in Zyak-Ishmetovsky Selsoviet of Kuyurgazinsky District
- Mikhaylovka, Meleuzovsky District, Republic of Bashkortostan, a village in Denisovsky Selsoviet of Meleuzovsky District
- Mikhaylovka, Mishkinsky District, Republic of Bashkortostan, a village in Novotroitsky Selsoviet of Mishkinsky District
- Mikhaylovka, Sharansky District, Republic of Bashkortostan, a village in Michurinsky Selsoviet of Sharansky District
- Mikhaylovka, Sterlitamaksky District, Republic of Bashkortostan, a village in Krasnoyarsky Selsoviet of Sterlitamaksky District
- Mikhaylovka, Ufimsky District, Republic of Bashkortostan, a selo in Mikhaylovsky Selsoviet of Ufimsky District
- Mikhaylovka, Yermekeyevsky District, Republic of Bashkortostan, a village in Sukkulovsky Selsoviet of Yermekeyevsky District

=== Belgorod Oblast ===
As of 2012, two rural localities in Belgorod Oblast bear this name:

- Mikhaylovka, Prokhorovsky District, Belgorod Oblast, a selo in Prokhorovsky District
- Mikhaylovka, Valuysky District, Belgorod Oblast, a khutor in Valuysky District

=== Bryansk Oblast ===
As of 2012, five rural localities in Bryansk Oblast bear this name:

- Mikhaylovka, Bryansky District, Bryansk Oblast, a settlement in Zhurinichsky Rural Administrative Okrug of Bryansky District; 53°22′N 34°50′E
- Mikhaylovka, Gordeyevsky District, Bryansk Oblast, a village in Tvorishinsky Rural Administrative Okrug of Gordeyevsky District; 52°55′N 32°0′E
- Mikhaylovka, Klimovsky District, Bryansk Oblast, a settlement in Kirillovsky Rural Administrative Okrug of Klimovsky District; 52°8′N 32°4′E
- Mikhaylovka, Pochepsky District, Bryansk Oblast, a settlement in Dmitrovsky Rural Administrative Okrug of Pochepsky District; 53°3′N 33°45′E
- Mikhaylovka, Surazhsky District, Bryansk Oblast, a village in Ovchinsky Rural Administrative Okrug of Surazhsky District; 53°6′N 32°12′E

=== Republic of Buryatia ===
As of 2012, two rural localities in the Republic of Buryatia bear this name:

- Mikhaylovka, Kizhinginsky District, Republic of Buryatia, a selo in Verkhnekodunsky Somon of Kizhinginsky District
- Mikhaylovka, Zakamensky District, Republic of Buryatia, a selo in Mikhaylovsky Selsoviet of Zakamensky District

=== Chelyabinsk Oblast ===
As of 2012, four rural localities in Chelyabinsk Oblast bear this name:

- Mikhaylovka, Kartalinsky District, Chelyabinsk Oblast, a village in Yeleninsky Selsoviet of Kartalinsky District
- Mikhaylovka, Kizilsky District, Chelyabinsk Oblast, a settlement in Obruchevsky Selsoviet of Kizilsky District
- Mikhaylovka, Plastovsky District, Chelyabinsk Oblast, a selo in Demarinsky Selsoviet of Plastovsky District
- Mikhaylovka, Uvelsky District, Chelyabinsk Oblast, a village in Petrovsky Selsoviet of Uvelsky District

=== Chuvash Republic ===
As of 2012, one rural locality in the Chuvash Republic bears this name:

- Mikhaylovka, Chuvash Republic, a village in Mikhaylovskoye Rural Settlement of Tsivilsky District

=== Irkutsk Oblast ===
As of 2012, one urban locality in Irkutsk Oblast bears this name:

- Mikhaylovka, Irkutsk Oblast, a work settlement in Cheremkhovsky District

=== Kaliningrad Oblast ===
As of 2012, two rural localities in Kaliningrad Oblast bear this name:

- Mikhaylovka, Chernyakhovsky District, Kaliningrad Oblast, a settlement in Kaluzhsky Rural Okrug of Chernyakhovsky District
- Mikhaylovka, Pravdinsky District, Kaliningrad Oblast, a settlement under the administrative jurisdiction of the urban-type settlement of district significance of Zheleznodorozhny in Pravdinsky District

=== Kaluga Oblast ===
As of 2012, four rural localities in Kaluga Oblast bear this name:

- Mikhaylovka (Sashkino Rural Settlement), Ferzikovsky District, Kaluga Oblast, a village in Ferzikovsky District; municipally, a part of Sashkino Rural Settlement of that district
- Mikhaylovka (Koltsovo Rural Settlement), Ferzikovsky District, Kaluga Oblast, a village in Ferzikovsky District; municipally, a part of Koltsovo Rural Settlement of that district
- Mikhaylovka, Meshchovsky District, Kaluga Oblast, a village in Meshchovsky District
- Mikhaylovka, Zhukovsky District, Kaluga Oblast, a village in Zhukovsky District

=== Kemerovo Oblast ===
As of 2012, four rural localities in Kemerovo Oblast bear this name:

- Mikhaylovka, Chebulinsky District, Kemerovo Oblast, a village in Ivanovskaya Rural Territory of Chebulinsky District; 55°55′N 87°55′E
- Mikhaylovka, Novokuznetsky District, Kemerovo Oblast, a village in Sosnovskaya Rural Territory of Novokuznetsky District; 53°38′N 87°1′E
- Mikhaylovka, Prokopyevsky District, Kemerovo Oblast, a selo in Mikhaylovskaya Rural Territory of Prokopyevsky District; 54°3′N 86°22′E
- Mikhaylovka, Yaysky District, Kemerovo Oblast, a village in Voznesenskaya Rural Territory of Yaysky District; 56°16′N 85°48′E

=== Krasnoyarsk Krai ===
As of 2012, eleven rural localities in Krasnoyarsk Krai bear this name:

- Mikhaylovka, Bogotolsky District, Krasnoyarsk Krai, a village in Yuryevsky Selsoviet of Bogotolsky District
- Mikhaylovka, Bolshemurtinsky District, Krasnoyarsk Krai, a village in Yentaulsky Selsoviet of Bolshemurtinsky District
- Mikhaylovka, Bolsheuluysky District, Krasnoyarsk Krai, a village in Udachinsky Selsoviet of Bolsheuluysky District
- Mikhaylovka, Dzerzhinsky District, Krasnoyarsk Krai, a selo in Mikhaylovsky Selsoviet of Dzerzhinsky District
- Mikhaylovka, Irbeysky District, Krasnoyarsk Krai, a village in Verkhneurinsky Selsoviet of Irbeysky District
- Mikhaylovka, Georgiyevsky Selsoviet, Kansky District, Krasnoyarsk Krai, a village in Georgiyevsky Selsoviet of Kansky District
- Mikhaylovka, Tersky Selsoviet, Kansky District, Krasnoyarsk Krai, a village in Tersky Selsoviet of Kansky District
- Mikhaylovka, Nizhneingashsky District, Krasnoyarsk Krai, a village in Sokolovsky Selsoviet of Nizhneingashsky District
- Mikhaylovka, Pirovsky District, Krasnoyarsk Krai, a village in Soloukhinsky Selsoviet of Pirovsky District
- Mikhaylovka, Uzhursky District, Krasnoyarsk Krai, a selo in Mikhaylovsky Selsoviet of Uzhursky District
- Mikhaylovka, Yemelyanovsky District, Krasnoyarsk Krai, a selo in Mikhaylovsky Selsoviet of Yemelyanovsky District

=== Kurgan Oblast ===
As of 2012, three rural localities in Kurgan Oblast bear this name:

- Mikhaylovka, Mokrousovsky District, Kurgan Oblast, a selo in Mikhaylovsky Selsoviet of Mokrousovsky District; 55°38′N 66°29′E
- Mikhaylovka, Shchuchansky District, Kurgan Oblast, a village in Puktyshsky Selsoviet of Shchuchansky District; 55°27′N 62°31′E
- Mikhaylovka, Shumikhinsky District, Kurgan Oblast, a village in Galkinsky Selsoviet of Shumikhinsky District; 55°39′N 62°52′E

=== Kursk Oblast ===
As of 2012, eleven rural localities in Kursk Oblast bear this name:

- Mikhaylovka, Cheremisinovsky District, Kursk Oblast, a selo in Mikhaylovsky Selsoviet of Cheremisinovsky District
- Mikhaylovka, Fatezhsky District, Kursk Oblast, a village in Bolsheannenkovsky Selsoviet of Fatezhsky District
- Mikhaylovka, Soldatsky Selsoviet, Gorshechensky District, Kursk Oblast, a settlement in Soldatsky Selsoviet of Gorshechensky District
- Mikhaylovka, Udobensky Selsoviet, Gorshechensky District, Kursk Oblast, a village in Udobensky Selsoviet of Gorshechensky District
- Mikhaylovka, Korenevsky District, Kursk Oblast, a village in Safonovsky Selsoviet of Korenevsky District
- Mikhaylovka, Oktyabrsky District, Kursk Oblast, a village in Artyukhovsky Selsoviet of Oktyabrsky District
- Mikhaylovka, Ponyrovsky District, Kursk Oblast, a village in Nizhnesmorodinsky Selsoviet of Ponyrovsky District
- Mikhaylovka, Rylsky District, Kursk Oblast, a selo in Mikhaylovsky Selsoviet of Rylsky District
- Mikhaylovka, Sudzhansky District, Kursk Oblast, a village in Martynovsky Selsoviet of Sudzhansky District
- Mikhaylovka, Zheleznogorsky District, Kursk Oblast, a sloboda in Mikhaylovsky Selsoviet of Zheleznogorsky District
- Mikhaylovka, Zolotukhinsky District, Kursk Oblast, a village in Fentisovsky Selsoviet of Zolotukhinsky District

=== Leningrad Oblast ===
As of 2012, two rural localities in Leningrad Oblast bear this name:

- Mikhaylovka, Lomonosovsky District, Leningrad Oblast, a village in Lagolovskoye Settlement Municipal Formation of Lomonosovsky District; 59°43′N 30°1′E
- Mikhaylovka, Vyborgsky District, Leningrad Oblast, a settlement under the administrative jurisdiction of Kamennogorskoye Settlement Municipal Formation in Vyborgsky District; 60°55′N 28°55′E

=== Lipetsk Oblast ===
As of 2012, six rural localities in Lipetsk Oblast bear this name:

- Mikhaylovka, Dolgorukovsky District, Lipetsk Oblast, a village in Bolsheboyevsky Selsoviet of Dolgorukovsky District; 52°21′N 38°33′E
- Mikhaylovka, Lebedyansky District, Lipetsk Oblast, a selo in Bolsheizbishchensky Selsoviet of Lebedyansky District; 52°55′N 39°28′E
- Mikhaylovka, Mikhaylovsky Selsoviet, Stanovlyansky District, Lipetsk Oblast, a village in Mikhaylovsky Selsoviet of Stanovlyansky District; 52°58′N 38°12′E
- Mikhaylovka, Palna-Mikhaylovsky Selsoviet, Stanovlyansky District, Lipetsk Oblast, a village in Palna-Mikhaylovsky Selsoviet of Stanovlyansky District
- Mikhaylovka, Terbunsky District, Lipetsk Oblast, a village in Kazinsky Selsoviet of Terbunsky District; 52°2′N 38°27′E
- Mikhaylovka, Yeletsky District, Lipetsk Oblast, a village in Yeletsky Selsoviet of Yeletsky District; 52°43′N 38°34′E

=== Mari El Republic ===
As of 2012, one rural locality in the Mari El Republic bears this name:

- Mikhaylovka, Mari El Republic, a village in Mikhaylovsky Rural Okrug of Sovetsky District; 56°39′N 48°15′E

=== Republic of Mordovia ===
As of 2012, six rural localities in the Republic of Mordovia bear this name:

- Mikhaylovka, Ardatovsky District, Republic of Mordovia, a selo in Lesozavodskoy Selsoviet of Ardatovsky District; 54°53′N 45°53′E
- Mikhaylovka, Atyashevsky District, Republic of Mordovia, a village in Vezhne-Chukalsky Selsoviet of Atyashevsky District; 54°43′N 45°49′E
- Mikhaylovka, Bolshebereznikovsky District, Republic of Mordovia, a village in Permissky Selsoviet of Bolshebereznikovsky District; 54°4′N 45°39′E
- Mikhaylovka, Lyambirsky District, Republic of Mordovia, a selo in Mikhaylovsky Selsoviet of Lyambirsky District; 54°17′N 45°29′E
- Mikhaylovka, Ruzayevsky District, Republic of Mordovia, a village in Trusklyaysky Selsoviet of Ruzayevsky District; 53°59′N 44°50′E
- Mikhaylovka, Yelnikovsky District, Republic of Mordovia, a settlement in Staroteshtelimsky Selsoviet of Yelnikovsky District; 54°34′N 44°6′E

=== Moscow Oblast ===
As of 2012, three rural localities in Moscow Oblast bear this name:

- Mikhaylovka, Istrinsky District, Moscow Oblast, a village in Buzharovskoye Rural Settlement of Istrinsky District; 55°58′N 36°49′E
- Mikhaylovka, Serpukhovsky District, Moscow Oblast, a village in Lipitskoye Rural Settlement of Serpukhovsky District
- Mikhaylovka, Solnechnogorsky District, Moscow Oblast, a village under the administrative jurisdiction of Povarovo Suburban Settlement in Solnechnogorsky District

=== Nizhny Novgorod Oblast ===
As of 2012, six rural localities in Nizhny Novgorod Oblast bear this name:

- Mikhaylovka, Knyagininsky District, Nizhny Novgorod Oblast, a settlement in Vozrozhdensky Selsoviet of Knyagininsky District
- Mikhaylovka, Krasnooktyabrsky District, Nizhny Novgorod Oblast, a village in Sarginsky Selsoviet of Krasnooktyabrsky District
- Mikhaylovka, Kulebaksky District, Nizhny Novgorod Oblast, a village in Serebryansky Selsoviet of Kulebaksky District
- Mikhaylovka, Sechenovsky District, Nizhny Novgorod Oblast, a village in Vasilyevsky Selsoviet of Sechenovsky District
- Mikhaylovka, Shatkovsky District, Nizhny Novgorod Oblast, a selo in Silinsky Selsoviet of Shatkovsky District
- Mikhaylovka, Sosnovsky District, Nizhny Novgorod Oblast, a village in Rozhkovsky Selsoviet of Sosnovsky District

=== Novosibirsk Oblast ===
As of 2012, nine rural localities in Novosibirsk Oblast bear this name:

- Mikhaylovka, Iskitimsky District, Novosibirsk Oblast, a settlement in Iskitimsky District
- Mikhaylovka, Iskitimsky District, Novosibirsk Oblast, a village in Iskitimsky District
- Mikhaylovka, Karasuksky District, Novosibirsk Oblast, a selo in Karasuksky District
- Mikhaylovka, Kolyvansky District, Novosibirsk Oblast, a village in Kolyvansky District
- Mikhaylovka, Kupinsky District, Novosibirsk Oblast, a village in Kupinsky District
- Mikhaylovka, Kuybyshevsky District, Novosibirsk Oblast, a selo in Kuybyshevsky District
- Mikhaylovka, Novosibirsky District, Novosibirsk Oblast, a settlement in Novosibirsky District
- Mikhaylovka, Ust-Tarksky District, Novosibirsk Oblast, a village in Ust-Tarksky District
- Mikhaylovka, Zdvinsky District, Novosibirsk Oblast, a village in Zdvinsky District

=== Omsk Oblast ===
As of 2012, twelve rural localities in Omsk Oblast bear this name:

- Mikhaylovka, Bolsherechensky District, Omsk Oblast, a village in Yevgashchinsky Rural Okrug of Bolsherechensky District
- Mikhaylovka, Cherlaksky District, Omsk Oblast, a village in Krasnooktyabrsky Rural Okrug of Cherlaksky District
- Mikhaylovka, Kolosovsky District, Omsk Oblast, a village in Taskatlinsky Rural Okrug of Kolosovsky District
- Mikhaylovka, Kormilovsky District, Omsk Oblast, a selo in Mikhaylovsky Rural Okrug of Kormilovsky District
- Mikhaylovka, Maryanovsky District, Omsk Oblast, a village in Bogolyubovsky Rural Okrug of Maryanovsky District
- Mikhaylovka, Muromtsevsky District, Omsk Oblast, a village in Karbyzinsky Rural Okrug of Muromtsevsky District
- Mikhaylovka, Nazyvayevsky District, Omsk Oblast, a village in Pokrovsky Rural Okrug of Nazyvayevsky District
- Mikhaylovka, Okoneshnikovsky District, Omsk Oblast, a village under the administrative jurisdiction of Okoneshnikovo Work Settlement in Okoneshnikovsky District
- Mikhaylovka, Sargatsky District, Omsk Oblast, a village in Bazhenovsky Rural Okrug of Sargatsky District
- Mikhaylovka, Sedelnikovsky District, Omsk Oblast, a village in Golubovsky Rural Okrug of Sedelnikovsky District
- Mikhaylovka, Lozhnikovsky Rural Okrug, Tarsky District, Omsk Oblast, a village in Lozhnikovsky Rural Okrug of Tarsky District
- Mikhaylovka, Vasissky Rural Okrug, Tarsky District, Omsk Oblast, a selo in Vasissky Rural Okrug of Tarsky District

=== Orenburg Oblast ===
As of 2012, nine rural localities in Orenburg Oblast bear this name:

- Mikhaylovka, Alexandrovsky District, Orenburg Oblast, a selo in Dobrinsky Selsoviet of Alexandrovsky District
- Mikhaylovka, Mikhaylovsky Selsoviet, Buguruslansky District, Orenburg Oblast, a selo in Mikhaylovsky Selsoviet of Buguruslansky District
- Mikhaylovka, Polibinsky Selsoviet, Buguruslansky District, Orenburg Oblast, a selo in Polibinsky Selsoviet of Buguruslansky District
- Mikhaylovka, Kurmanayevsky District, Orenburg Oblast, a selo in Mikhaylovsky Selsoviet of Kurmanayevsky District
- Mikhaylovka, Oktyabrsky District, Orenburg Oblast, a selo in Novonikitinsky Selsoviet of Oktyabrsky District
- Mikhaylovka, Ponomaryovsky District, Orenburg Oblast, a settlement in Klyuchevsky Selsoviet of Ponomaryovsky District
- Mikhaylovka, Sakmarsky District, Orenburg Oblast, a selo in Yegoryevsky Selsoviet of Sakmarsky District
- Mikhaylovka, Severny District, Orenburg Oblast, a settlement in Kursko-Vasilyevsky Selsoviet of Severny District
- Mikhaylovka, Sol-Iletsky District, Orenburg Oblast, a selo in Mikhaylovsky Selsoviet of Sol-Iletsky District

=== Oryol Oblast ===
As of 2012, eight rural localities in Oryol Oblast bear this name:

- Mikhaylovka, Kolpnyansky District, Oryol Oblast, a village in Karlovsky Selsoviet of Kolpnyansky District
- Mikhaylovka, Nikitinsky Selsoviet, Novoderevenkovsky District, Oryol Oblast, a settlement in Nikitinsky Selsoviet of Novoderevenkovsky District
- Mikhaylovka, Starogolsky Selsoviet, Novoderevenkovsky District, Oryol Oblast, a village in Starogolsky Selsoviet of Novoderevenkovsky District
- Mikhaylovka, Orlovsky District, Oryol Oblast, a village in Lavrovsky Selsoviet of Orlovsky District
- Mikhaylovka, Sverdlovsky District, Oryol Oblast, a village in Bogodukhovsky Selsoviet of Sverdlovsky District
- Mikhaylovka, Uritsky District, Oryol Oblast, a village in Lunacharsky Selsoviet of Uritsky District
- Mikhaylovka, Zalegoshchensky District, Oryol Oblast, a village in Zolotarevsky Selsoviet of Zalegoshchensky District
- Mikhaylovka, Znamensky District, Oryol Oblast, a village in Znamensky Selsoviet of Znamensky District

=== Penza Oblast ===
As of 2012, five rural localities in Penza Oblast bear this name:

- Mikhaylovka, Belinsky District, Penza Oblast, a selo in Lermontovsky Selsoviet of Belinsky District
- Mikhaylovka, Luninsky District, Penza Oblast, a selo in Stepanovsky Selsoviet of Luninsky District
- Mikhaylovka, Mokshansky District, Penza Oblast, a selo in Plessky Selsoviet of Mokshansky District
- Mikhaylovka, Penzensky District, Penza Oblast, a village in Bolsheyelansky Selsoviet of Penzensky District
- Mikhaylovka, Zemetchinsky District, Penza Oblast, a village in Morsovsky Selsoviet of Zemetchinsky District

=== Perm Krai ===
As of 2012, two rural localities in Perm Krai bear this name:

- Mikhaylovka, Ordinsky District, Perm Krai, a village in Ordinsky District
- Mikhaylovka, Uinsky District, Perm Krai, a village in Uinsky District

=== Primorsky Krai ===
As of 2012, three rural localities in Primorsky Krai bear this name:

- Mikhaylovka, Chuguyevsky District, Primorsky Krai, a selo in Chuguyevsky District
- Mikhaylovka, Mikhaylovsky District, Primorsky Krai, a selo in Mikhaylovsky District
- Mikhaylovka, Olginsky District, Primorsky Krai, a selo in Olginsky District

=== Rostov Oblast ===
As of 2012, seven rural localities in Rostov Oblast bear this name:

- Mikhaylovka, Kamensky District, Rostov Oblast, a khutor in Krasnovskoye Rural Settlement of Kamensky District
- Mikhaylovka, Industrialnoye Rural Settlement, Kasharsky District, Rostov Oblast, a khutor in Industrialnoye Rural Settlement of Kasharsky District
- Mikhaylovka, Verkhnesvechnikovskoye Rural Settlement, Kasharsky District, Rostov Oblast, a khutor in Verkhnesvechnikovskoye Rural Settlement of Kasharsky District
- Mikhaylovka, Krasnosulinsky District, Rostov Oblast, a khutor in Mikhaylovskoye Rural Settlement of Krasnosulinsky District
- Mikhaylovka, Neklinovsky District, Rostov Oblast, a khutor in Fedorovskoye Rural Settlement of Neklinovsky District
- Mikhaylovka, Tatsinsky District, Rostov Oblast, a khutor in Skosyrskoye Rural Settlement of Tatsinsky District
- Mikhaylovka, Tselinsky District, Rostov Oblast, a selo in Mikhaylovskoye Rural Settlement of Tselinsky District

=== Ryazan Oblast ===
As of 2012, five rural localities in Ryazan Oblast bear this name:

- Mikhaylovka, Miloslavsky District, Ryazan Oblast, a village in Bogoroditsky Rural Okrug of Miloslavsky District
- Mikhaylovka, Pitelinsky District, Ryazan Oblast, a village in Gridinsky Rural Okrug of Pitelinsky District
- Mikhaylovka, Ryazhsky District, Ryazan Oblast, a village in Vvedenovsky Rural Okrug of Ryazhsky District
- Mikhaylovka, Sarayevsky District, Ryazan Oblast, a village in Ostrovsky Rural Okrug of Sarayevsky District
- Mikhaylovka, Shatsky District, Ryazan Oblast, a village in Yambirnsky Rural Okrug of Shatsky District

=== Sakha Republic ===
As of 2012, one rural locality in the Sakha Republic bears this name:

- Mikhaylovka, Sakha Republic, a selo in Somorsunsky Rural Okrug of Amginsky District

=== Sakhalin Oblast ===
As of 2012, one rural locality in Sakhalin Oblast bears this name:

- Mikhaylovka, Sakhalin Oblast, a selo in Alexandrovsk-Sakhalinsky District

=== Samara Oblast ===
As of 2012, four rural localities in Samara Oblast bear this name:

- Mikhaylovka, Khvorostyansky District, Samara Oblast, a village in Khvorostyansky District
- Mikhaylovka, Koshkinsky District, Samara Oblast, a settlement in Koshkinsky District
- Mikhaylovka, Krasnoyarsky District, Samara Oblast, a selo in Krasnoyarsky District
- Mikhaylovka, Sergiyevsky District, Samara Oblast, a settlement in Sergiyevsky District

=== Saratov Oblast ===
As of 2012, eleven rural localities in Saratov Oblast bear this name:

- Mikhaylovka, Atkarsky District, Saratov Oblast, a village in Atkarsky District
- Mikhaylovka, Balashovsky District, Saratov Oblast, a selo in Balashovsky District
- Mikhaylovka, Fyodorovsky District, Saratov Oblast, a selo in Fyodorovsky District
- Mikhaylovka, Kalininsky District, Saratov Oblast, a selo in Kalininsky District
- Mikhaylovka, Marksovsky District, Saratov Oblast, a selo in Marksovsky District
- Mikhaylovka, Novoburassky District, Saratov Oblast, a village in Novoburassky District
- Mikhaylovka, Saratovsky District, Saratov Oblast, a selo in Saratovsky District
- Mikhaylovka, Voskresensky District, Saratov Oblast, a selo in Voskresensky District
- Mikhaylovka (selo), Yekaterinovsky District, Saratov Oblast, a selo in Yekaterinovsky District
- Mikhaylovka (village), Yekaterinovsky District, Saratov Oblast, a village in Yekaterinovsky District
- Mikhaylovka, Yershovsky District, Saratov Oblast, a selo in Yershovsky District

=== Smolensk Oblast ===
As of 2012, seven rural localities in Smolensk Oblast bear this name:

- Mikhaylovka, Dorogobuzhsky District, Smolensk Oblast, a village in Balakirevskoye Rural Settlement of Dorogobuzhsky District
- Mikhaylovka, Monastyrshchinsky District, Smolensk Oblast, a village in Novomikhaylovskoye Rural Settlement of Monastyrshchinsky District
- Mikhaylovka, Pochinkovsky District, Smolensk Oblast, a village in Vaskovskoye Rural Settlement of Pochinkovsky District
- Mikhaylovka, Kostyrevskoye Rural Settlement, Roslavlsky District, Smolensk Oblast, a village in Kostyrevskoye Rural Settlement of Roslavlsky District
- Mikhaylovka, Roslavlskoye Rural Settlement, Roslavlsky District, Smolensk Oblast, a village in Roslavlskoye Rural Settlement of Roslavlsky District
- Mikhaylovka, Yekimovichskoye Rural Settlement, Roslavlsky District, Smolensk Oblast, a village in Yekimovichskoye Rural Settlement of Roslavlsky District
- Mikhaylovka, Smolensky District, Smolensk Oblast, a village in Katynskoye Rural Settlement of Smolensky District

=== Stavropol Krai ===
As of 2012, one rural locality in Stavropol Krai bears this name:

- Mikhaylovka, Stavropol Krai, a settlement in Soldato-Alexsandrovsky Selsoviet of Sovetsky District

=== Sverdlovsk Oblast ===
As of 2012, two rural localities in Sverdlovsk Oblast bear this name:

- Mikhaylovka, Garinsky District, Sverdlovsk Oblast, a village in Krutorechensky Selsoviet of Garinsky District
- Mikhaylovka, Kamyshlovsky District, Sverdlovsk Oblast, a village in Kvashninsky Selsoviet of Kamyshlovsky District

=== Tambov Oblast ===
As of 2012, fifteen rural localities in Tambov Oblast bear this name:

- Mikhaylovka, Inzhavinsky District, Tambov Oblast, a selo in Mikhaylovsky Selsoviet of Inzhavinsky District
- Mikhaylovka, Kirsanovsky District, Tambov Oblast, a village in Sokolovsky Selsoviet of Kirsanovsky District
- Mikhaylovka, Alexandrovsky Selsoviet, Mordovsky District, Tambov Oblast, a selo in Alexandrovsky Selsoviet of Mordovsky District
- Mikhaylovka, Lavrovsky Selsoviet, Mordovsky District, Tambov Oblast, a village in Lavrovsky Selsoviet of Mordovsky District
- Mikhaylovka, Novopokrovsky Settlement Council, Mordovsky District, Tambov Oblast, a selo under the administrative jurisdiction of Novopokrovsky Settlement Council in Mordovsky District
- Mikhaylovka, Morshansky District, Tambov Oblast, a village in Ustyinsky Selsoviet of Morshansky District
- Mikhaylovka, Pervomaysky District, Tambov Oblast, a settlement in Novoseslavinsky Selsoviet of Pervomaysky District
- Mikhaylovka, Petrovsky Selsoviet, Petrovsky District, Tambov Oblast, a village in Petrovsky Selsoviet of Petrovsky District
- Mikhaylovka, Pokrovo-Chicherinsky Selsoviet, Petrovsky District, Tambov Oblast, a village in Pokrovo-Chicherinsky Selsoviet of Petrovsky District
- Mikhaylovka, Pichayevsky District, Tambov Oblast, a village in Bolshelomovissky Selsoviet of Pichayevsky District
- Mikhaylovka, Rzhaksinsky District, Tambov Oblast, a village in Stepanovsky Selsoviet of Rzhaksinsky District
- Mikhaylovka, Tokaryovsky District, Tambov Oblast, a village in Abakumovsky Selsoviet of Tokaryovsky District
- Mikhaylovka, Burnaksky Selsoviet, Zherdevsky District, Tambov Oblast, a selo in Burnaksky Selsoviet of Zherdevsky District
- Mikhaylovka, Shpikulovsky Selsoviet, Zherdevsky District, Tambov Oblast, a settlement in Shpikulovsky Selsoviet of Zherdevsky District
- Mikhaylovka, Znamensky District, Tambov Oblast, a village in Kuzminsky Selsoviet of Znamensky District

=== Republic of Tatarstan ===
As of 2012, six rural localities in the Republic of Tatarstan bear this name:

- Mikhaylovka, Aktanyshsky District, Republic of Tatarstan, a settlement in Aktanyshsky District
- Mikhaylovka, Arsky District, Republic of Tatarstan, a settlement in Arsky District
- Mikhaylovka, Chistopolsky District, Republic of Tatarstan, a village in Chistopolsky District
- Mikhaylovka, Leninogorsky District, Republic of Tatarstan, a selo in Leninogorsky District
- Mikhaylovka, Muslyumovsky District, Republic of Tatarstan, a selo in Muslyumovsky District
- Mikhaylovka, Nurlatsky District, Republic of Tatarstan, a settlement in Nurlatsky District

=== Tomsk Oblast ===
As of 2012, four rural localities in Tomsk Oblast bear this name:

- Mikhaylovka, Asinovsky District, Tomsk Oblast, a village in Asinovsky District
- Mikhaylovka, Shegarsky District, Tomsk Oblast, a village in Shegarsky District
- Mikhaylovka, Tomsky District, Tomsk Oblast, a village in Tomsky District
- Mikhaylovka, Zyryansky District, Tomsk Oblast, a selo in Zyryansky District

=== Tula Oblast ===
As of 2012, nine rural localities in Tula Oblast bear this name:

- Mikhaylovka, Chernsky District, Tula Oblast, a village in Popovskaya Rural Administration of Chernsky District
- Mikhaylovka, Kamensky District, Tula Oblast, a village in Arkhangelsky Rural Okrug of Kamensky District
- Mikhaylovka, Kimovsky District, Tula Oblast, a village in Baranovsky Rural Okrug of Kimovsky District
- Mikhaylovka, Kireyevsky District, Tula Oblast, a village in Novoselsky Rural Okrug of Kireyevsky District
- Mikhaylovka, Novomoskovsky District, Tula Oblast, a village in Pravdinsky Rural Okrug of Novomoskovsky District
- Mikhaylovka, Shchyokinsky District, Tula Oblast, a village in Lukinskaya Rural Administration of Shchyokinsky District
- Mikhaylovka, Suvorovsky District, Tula Oblast, a village in Markovskaya Rural Territory of Suvorovsky District
- Mikhaylovka, Uzlovsky District, Tula Oblast, a village in Nikolskaya Rural Administration of Uzlovsky District
- Mikhaylovka, Venyovsky District, Tula Oblast, a village in Dyakonovsky Rural Okrug of Venyovsky District

=== Tver Oblast ===
As of 2012, one rural locality in Tver Oblast bears this name:

- Mikhaylovka, Tver Oblast, a village in Selyanskoye Rural Settlement of Nelidovsky District

=== Tyumen Oblast ===
As of 2012, six rural localities in Tyumen Oblast bear this name:

- Mikhaylovka, Golyshmanovsky District, Tyumen Oblast, a village in Malyshensky Rural Okrug of Golyshmanovsky District
- Mikhaylovka, Ishimsky District, Tyumen Oblast, a village in Desyatovsky Rural Okrug of Ishimsky District
- Mikhaylovka, Kazansky District, Tyumen Oblast, a village in Chelyuskinsky Rural Okrug of Kazansky District
- Mikhaylovka, Sladkovsky District, Tyumen Oblast, a village in Alexandrovsky Rural Okrug of Sladkovsky District
- Mikhaylovka, Tobolsky District, Tyumen Oblast, a village in Bashkovsky Rural Okrug of Tobolsky District
- Mikhaylovka, Yarkovsky District, Tyumen Oblast, a village in Novoalexandrovsky Rural Okrug of Yarkovsky District

=== Udmurt Republic ===
As of 2012, two rural localities in the Udmurt Republic bear this name:

- Mikhaylovka, Igrinsky District, Udmurt Republic, a village in Sepsky Selsoviet of Igrinsky District
- Mikhaylovka, Kambarsky District, Udmurt Republic, a selo in Mikhaylovsky Selsoviet of Kambarsky District

=== Ulyanovsk Oblast ===
As of 2012, two rural localities in Ulyanovsk Oblast bear this name:

- Mikhaylovka, Terengulsky District, Ulyanovsk Oblast, a selo in Mikhaylovsky Rural Okrug of Terengulsky District
- Mikhaylovka, Ulyanovsky District, Ulyanovsk Oblast, a village in Timiryazevsky Rural Okrug of Ulyanovsky District

=== Vladimir Oblast ===
As of 2012, one rural locality in Vladimir Oblast bears this name:

- Mikhaylovka, Vladimir Oblast, a village in Muromsky District

=== Volgograd Oblast ===
As of 2012, three inhabited localities in Volgograd Oblast bear this name:

Urban localities

- Mikhaylovka, Volgograd Oblast, a town; administratively incorporated as a town of oblast significance

Rural localities

- Mikhaylovka, Kikvidzensky District, Volgograd Oblast, a khutor in Yezhovsky Selsoviet of Kikvidzensky District
- Mikhaylovka, Olkhovsky District, Volgograd Oblast, a selo in Kamennobrodsky Selsoviet of Olkhovsky District

=== Vologda Oblast ===
As of 2012, one rural locality in Vologda Oblast bears this name:

- Mikhaylovka, Vologda Oblast, a settlement in Nizhnepechengsky Selsoviet of Totemsky District

=== Voronezh Oblast ===
As of 2012, six rural localities in Voronezh Oblast bear this name:

- Mikhaylovka, Ertilsky District, Voronezh Oblast, a settlement in Pervoertilskoye Rural Settlement of Ertilsky District
- Mikhaylovka, Kantemirovsky District, Voronezh Oblast, a selo in Mikhaylovskoye Rural Settlement of Kantemirovsky District
- Mikhaylovka, Kashirsky District, Voronezh Oblast, a khutor in Kruglyanskoye Rural Settlement of Kashirsky District
- Mikhaylovka, Novousmansky District, Voronezh Oblast, a village in Timiryazevskoye Rural Settlement of Novousmansky District
- Mikhaylovka, Pavlovsky District, Voronezh Oblast, a selo in Petrovskoye Rural Settlement of Pavlovsky District
- Mikhaylovka, Ternovsky District, Voronezh Oblast, a village in Narodnenskoye Rural Settlement of Ternovsky District

=== Zabaykalsky Krai ===
As of 2012, one rural locality in Zabaykalsky Krai bears this name:

- Mikhaylovka, Zabaykalsky Krai, a selo in Nerchinsko-Zavodsky District

== Abolished localities ==
- Mikhaylovka, Khabarsky District, Altai Krai, a settlement in Zyatkovo-Rechensky Selsoviet of Khabarsky District in Altai Krai; abolished in January 2011
- Mikhaylovka, Mglinsky District, Bryansk Oblast, a settlement in Vetlevsky Selsoviet of Mglinsky District in Bryansk Oblast; abolished in May 2010

== Alternative names ==
- Mikhaylovka, alternative name of Novomikhaylovka, a settlement in Vlasikhinskaya Settlement Administration under the administrative jurisdiction of Industrialny City District of the city of krai significance of Barnaul in Altai Krai; 53°21′N 83°29′E
- Mikhaylovka, alternative name of Mikhaylovskoye, a selo in Mikhaylovsky Selsoviet of Mikhaylovsky District in Altai Krai; 51°49′N 79°44′E
- Mikhaylovka, alternative name of Dzhalykovo, a selo in Dzhalykovskaya Rural Administration of Lagansky District in the Republic of Kalmykia; 45°37′N 47°26′E
- Mikhaylovka, alternative name of Mikhaylovsky, a settlement in Yelykayevskaya Rural Territory of Kemerovsky District in Kemerovo Oblast; 55°17′N 86°23′E
- Mikhaylovka, alternative name of Novomikhaylovskoye, a selo in Novomikhaylovsky Rural Okrug of Kushchyovsky District in Krasnodar Krai; 46°33′N 39°52′E
- Mikhaylovka, alternative name of Mikhaylovskaya, a village in Ropshinskoye Settlement Municipal Formation of Lomonosovsky District in Leningrad Oblast; 59°44′N 29°51′E
- Mikhaylovka, alternative name of Mikhaylovskoye, a selo in Bolsheazyassky Selsoviet of Kovylkinsky District in the Republic of Mordovia; 54°8′N 43°34′E
- Mikhaylovka, alternative name of Staraya Mikhaylovka, a selo in Annenkovsky Selsoviet of Romodanovsky District in the Republic of Mordovia; 54°21′N 45°10′E
- Mikhaylovka, alternative name of Mikhalkovo, a village in Ilyinskoye Rural Settlement of Krasnogorsky District in Moscow Oblast; 55°47′N 37°15′E
- Mikhaylovka, alternative name of Mikhaylovskoye, a village in Yaropoletskoye Rural Settlement of Volokolamsky District in Moscow Oblast; 56°4′N 35°51′E
