= Nizhneye Absalyamovo =

Nizhneye Absalyamovo Нижнее Абсалямово
- Village
- Location within Bashkortostan Location within Russia
- Coordinates: 55°35′N 58°11′E
- Country: Russia
- Region: Bashkortostan
- District: Duvansky District
- Time zone: UTC+5:00

Nizhneye Absalyamovo (Russian: Нижнее Абсалямово; Bashkir: Түбәнге Әбсәләм, Tübänge Äbsäläm) is a rural locality (a village) in Ariyevsky Selsoviet, Duvansky District, Bashkortostan, Russia. The population was 13 as of 2010. There is 1 street.

== Geography ==
Nizhneye Absalyamovo is located 9 km northwest of Mesyagutovo (the district's administrative centre) by road. Verkhneye Absalyamovo is the nearest rural locality.
