= Lemazy =

Rural locality in Bashkortostan, Russia

Lemazy Лемазы
- Selo
- Location within Bashkortostan Location within Russia
- Coordinates: 55°44′N 58°04′E
- Country: Russia
- Region: Bashkortostan
- District: Duvansky District
- Time zone: UTC+5:00

Lemazy (Russian: Лемазы; Bashkir: Ләмәҙ, Lämäź) is a rural locality (a selo) and the administrative centre of Lemazinsky Selsoviet, Duvansky District, Bashkortostan, Russia. The population was 531 as of 2010. There are 3 streets.

== Geography ==
Lemazy is located 40 km northwest of Mesyagutovo (the district's administrative centre) by road. Kutrasovka is the nearest rural locality.
