= Anzyak =

Anzyak Анзяк
- Selo
- Location within Bashkortostan Location within Russia
- Coordinates: 55°27′N 58°18′E
- Country: Russia
- Region: Bashkortostan
- District: Duvansky District
- Time zone: UTC+5:00

Anzyak (Russian: Анзяк; Bashkir: Әнйәк, Änyäk) is a rural locality (a selo) in Rukhtinsky Selsoviet, Duvansky District, Bashkortostan, Russia. The population was 382 as of 2010. There are 2 streets.

== Geography ==
Anzyak is located 18 km southeast of Mesyagutovo (the district's administrative centre) by road. Rukhtino is the nearest rural locality.
