= Asinovsky =

Asinovsky (masculine), Asinovskaya (feminine), or Asinovskoye (neuter) may refer to:

- Asinovsky District, a district of Tomsk Oblast, Russia
- Asinovskoye Urban Settlement, a municipal formation which the town of Asino in Asinovsky District of Tomsk Oblast, Russia is incorporated as
