= Matavla =

Matavla Матавла
- Village
- Location within Bashkortostan Location within Russia
- Coordinates: 56°04′N 57°34′E
- Country: Russia
- Region: Bashkortostan
- District: Duvansky District
- Time zone: UTC+5:00

Matavla (Russian: Матавла; Bashkir: Мәтәүле, Mätäwle) is a rural locality (a village) in Zaimkinsky Selsoviet, Duvansky District, Bashkortostan, Russia. The population was 101 as of 2010. There are 2 streets.

== Geography ==
Matavla is located 103 km northwest of Mesyagutovo (the district's administrative centre) by road. Ust-Ayaz is the nearest rural locality.
