= Pobeda, Duvansky District, Republic of Bashkortostan =

Pobeda Победа
- Village
- Location within Bashkortostan Location within Russia
- Coordinates: 55°29′N 58°14′E
- Country: Russia
- Region: Bashkortostan
- District: Duvansky District
- Time zone: UTC+5:00

Pobeda (Russian: Победа) is a rural locality (a village) in Sikiyazsky Selsoviet, Duvansky District, Bashkortostan, Russia. The population was 20 as of 2010. There is 1 street.

== Geography ==
Pobeda is located 5 km south of Mesyagutovo (the district's administrative centre) by road. Mesyagutovo is the nearest rural locality.
