= Novokhalilovo =

Novokhalilovo Новохалилово
- Village
- Location within Bashkortostan Location within Russia
- Coordinates: 55°31′N 58°22′E
- Country: Russia
- Region: Bashkortostan
- District: Duvansky District
- Time zone: UTC+5:00

Novokhalilovo (Russian: Новохалилово; Bashkir: Яңы Хәлил, Yañı Xälil) is a rural locality (a village) in Mesyagutovsky Selsoviet Duvansky District, Bashkortostan, Russia. The population was 156 as of 2010. There are 3 streets.

== Geography ==
Novokhalilovo is located 10 km east of Mesyagutovo (the district's administrative centre) by road. Mesyagutovo is the nearest rural locality.
