= Karakulevo =

Karakulevo Каракулево
- Village
- Location within Bashkortostan Location within Russia
- Coordinates: 55°34′N 58°10′E
- Country: Russia
- Region: Bashkortostan
- District: Duvansky District
- Time zone: UTC+5:00

Karakulevo (Russian: Каракулево; Bashkir: Ҡаракүл, Qarakül) is a rural locality (a village) in Ariyevsky Selsoviet, Duvansky District, Bashkortostan, Russia. The population was 357 as of 2010. There are 6 streets.

== Geography ==
Karakulevo is located 7 km northwest of Mesyagutovo (the district's administrative centre) by road. Mesyagutovo is the nearest rural locality.
