= Ozero, Duvansky District, Republic of Bashkortostan =

Ozero Озеро
- Selo
- Location within Bashkortostan Location within Russia
- Coordinates: 55°30′N 58°06′E
- Country: Russia
- Region: Bashkortostan
- District: Duvansky District
- Time zone: UTC+5:00

Ozero (Russian: Озеро) is a rural locality (a selo) in Sikiyazsky Selsoviet, Duvansky District, Bashkortostan, Russia. The population was 629 as of 2010. There are 8 streets.

== Geography ==
Ozero is located 13 km southwest of Mesyagutovo (the district's administrative centre) by road. Sikiyaz is the nearest rural locality.
