= Ust-Yuguz =

Ust-Yuguz Усть-Югуз
- Village
- Location within Bashkortostan Location within Russia
- Coordinates: 56°03′N 57°44′E
- Country: Russia
- Region: Bashkortostan
- District: Duvansky District
- Time zone: UTC+5:00

Ust-Yuguz (Russian: Усть-Югуз; Bashkir: Усть-Үгеҙ, Ust-Ügeź) is a rural locality (a village) in Zaimkinsky Selsoviet, Duvansky District, Bashkortostan, Russia. The population was 86 as of 2010. There are 4 streets.

== Geography ==
Ust-Yuguz is located 94 km northwest of Mesyagutovo (the district's administrative centre) by road. Ust-Ayaz is the nearest rural locality.
