= Yelantub =

Yelantub Елантуб
- Village
- Location within Bashkortostan Location within Russia
- Coordinates: 55°38′N 57°51′E
- Country: Russia
- Region: Bashkortostan
- District: Duvansky District
- Time zone: UTC+5:00

Yelantub (Russian: Елантуб; Bashkir: Йылантөп, Yılantöp) is a rural locality (a village) in Ulkundinsky Selsoviet, Duvansky District, Bashkortostan, Russia. The population was 85 as of 2010. There are 3 streets.

== Geography ==
Yelantub is located 31 km northwest of Mesyagutovo (the district's administrative centre) by road. Mitrofanovka is the nearest rural locality.
