= Koshelevka, Republic of Bashkortostan =

Koshelevka Кошелевка
- Selo
- Location within Bashkortostan Location within Russia
- Coordinates: 55°34′N 57°45′E
- Country: Russia
- Region: Bashkortostan
- District: Duvansky District
- Time zone: UTC+5:00

Koshelevka (Russian: Кошелевка) is a rural locality (a selo) in Mikhaylovsky Selsoviet, Duvansky District, Bashkortostan, Russia. The population was 3 as of 2010. There is 1 street.

== Geography ==
Koshelevka is located 36 km west of Mesyagutovo (the district's administrative centre) by road. Yezhovka is the nearest rural locality.
