= Kadyrovo, Duvansky District, Republic of Bashkortostan =

Kadyrovo Кадырово
- Village
- Location within Bashkortostan Location within Russia
- Coordinates: 55°22′N 58°16′E
- Country: Russia
- Region: Bashkortostan
- District: Duvansky District
- Time zone: UTC+5:00

Kadyrovo (Russian: Кадырово; Bashkir: Ҡәҙер, Qäźer) is a rural locality (a village) in Rukhtinsky Selsoviet, Duvansky District, Bashkortostan, Russia. The population was 400 as of 2010. There are 6 streets.

== Geography ==
Kadyrovo is located 26 km south of Mesyagutovo (the district's administrative centre) by road. Yelanysh is the nearest rural locality.
