= Burtsevka =

Burtsevka Бурцевка
- Village
- Location within Bashkortostan Location within Russia
- Coordinates: 55°36′N 57°24′E
- Country: Russia
- Region: Bashkortostan
- District: Duvansky District
- Time zone: UTC+5:00

Burtsevka (Russian: Бурцевка) is a rural locality (a village) in Duvansky Selsoviet, Duvansky District, Bashkortostan, Russia. The population was 39 as of 2010. There is 1 street.

== Geography ==
Burtsevka is located 73 km west of Mesyagutovo (the district's administrative centre) by road. Komsomolsky is the nearest rural locality.
