= Meteli =

Meteli Метели
- Selo
- Location within Bashkortostan Location within Russia
- Coordinates: 56°00′N 57°56′E
- Country: Russia
- Region: Bashkortostan
- District: Duvansky District
- Time zone: UTC+5:00

Meteli (Russian: Метели; Bashkir: Мәтәле, Mätäle) is a rural locality (a selo) and the administrative centre of Metelinsky Selsoviet, Duvansky District, Bashkortostan, Russia. The population was 1,080 as of 2010. There are 10 streets.

== Geography ==
Meteli is located 74 km north of Mesyagutovo (the district's administrative centre) by road. Abdullino is the nearest rural locality.
