= Ignashkino, Duvansky District, Republic of Bashkortostan =

Ignashkino Игнашкино
- Village
- Location within Bashkortostan Location within Russia
- Coordinates: 55°35′N 57°52′E
- Country: Russia
- Region: Bashkortostan
- District: Duvansky District
- Time zone: UTC+5:00

Ignashkino (Russian: Игнашкино) is a rural locality (a village) in Mikhaylovsky Selsoviet, Duvansky District, Bashkortostan, Russia. The population was 4 as of 2010. There is 1 street.

== Geography ==
Ignashkino is located 28 km west of Mesyagutovo (the district's administrative centre) by road. Mikhaylovka is the nearest rural locality.
