= Kalmash =

Kalmash Калмаш
- Selo
- Location within Bashkortostan Location within Russia
- Coordinates: 55°37′N 57°28′E
- Country: Russia
- Region: Bashkortostan
- District: Duvansky District
- Time zone: UTC+5:00

Kalmash (Russian: Калмаш; Bashkir: Ҡалмаш, Qalmaş) is a rural locality (a selo) in Duvansky Selsoviet, Duvansky District, Bashkortostan, Russia. The population was 131 as of 2010. There are 2 streets.

== Geography ==
Kalmash is located 67 km west of Mesyagutovo (the district's administrative centre) by road. Komsomolsky and Oktyabrsky are the nearest rural localities.
