= Marzhangulovo =

Marzhangulovo Маржангулово
- Village
- Location within Bashkortostan Location within Russia
- Coordinates: 55°37′N 58°13′E
- Country: Russia
- Region: Bashkortostan
- District: Duvansky District
- Time zone: UTC+5:00

Marzhangulovo (Russian: Маржангулово; Bashkir: Мәрйәмғол, Märyämğol) is a rural locality (a village) in Ariyevsky Selsoviet, Duvansky District, Bashkortostan, Russia. The population was 231 as of 2010. There is 1 street.

== Geography ==
Marzhangulovo is located 13 km north of Mesyagutovo (the district's administrative centre) by road. Ariyevo is the nearest rural locality.
