= Safonovka =

Safonovka Сафоновка
- Selo
- Location within Bashkortostan Location within Russia
- Coordinates: 55°34′N 57°23′E
- Country: Russia
- Region: Bashkortostan
- District: Duvansky District
- Time zone: UTC+5:00

Safonovka (Russian: Сафоновка) is a rural locality (a selo) in Duvansky Selsoviet, Duvansky District, Bashkortostan, Russia. The population was 42 as of 2010. There is 1 street.

== Geography ==
Safonovka is located 78 km west of Mesyagutovo (the district's administrative centre) by road. Burtsevka is the nearest rural locality.
