= Starokhalilovo =

Starokhalilovo Старохалилово
- Selo
- Location within Bashkortostan Location within Russia
- Coordinates: 55°34′N 58°20′E
- Country: Russia
- Region: Bashkortostan
- District: Duvansky District
- Time zone: UTC+5:00

Starokhalilovo (Russian: Старохалилово; Bashkir: Иҫке Хәлил, İśke Xälil) is a rural locality (a selo) in Mesyagutovsky Selsoviet Duvansky District, Bashkortostan, Russia. The population was 378 as of 2010. There are 10 streets.

== Geography ==
Starokhalilovo is located 10 km northeast of Mesyagutovo (the district's administrative centre) by road. Mesyagutovo is the nearest rural locality.
