= Gladkikh =

Gladkikh Гладких
- Village
- Location within Bashkortostan Location within Russia
- Coordinates: 56°01′N 57°53′E
- Country: Russia
- Region: Bashkortostan
- District: Duvansky District
- Time zone: UTC+5:00

Gladkikh (Russian: Гладких) is a rural locality (a village) in Metelinsky Selsoviet, Duvansky District, Bashkortostan, Russia. The population was 12 as of 2010.

== Geography ==
Gladkikh is located 78 km southwest of Mesyagutovo (the district's administrative centre) by road. Meteli is the nearest rural locality.
