= Verkhneye Absalyamovo =

Verkhneye Absalyamovo Верхнее Абсалямово
- Village
- Location within Bashkortostan Location within Russia
- Coordinates: 55°34′N 58°10′E
- Country: Russia
- Region: Bashkortostan
- District: Duvansky District
- Time zone: UTC+5:00

Verkhneye Absalyamovo (Russian: Верхнее Абсалямово; Bashkir: Үрге Әбсәләм, Ürge Äbsäläm) is a rural locality (a village) in Ariyevsky Selsoviet, Duvansky District, Bashkortostan, Russia. The population was 103 as of 2010. There is 1 street.

== Geography ==
Verkhneye Absalyamovo is located 7 km northwest of Mesyagutovo (the district's administrative centre) by road. Karakulevo is the nearest rural locality.
