= Kutrasovka =

Kutrasovka Кутрасовка
- Village
- Location within Bashkortostan Location within Russia
- Coordinates: 55°42′N 58°01′E
- Country: Russia
- Region: Bashkortostan
- District: Duvansky District
- Time zone: UTC+5:00

Kutrasovka (Russian: Кутрасовка; Bashkir: Ҡутрас, Qutras) is a rural locality (a village) in Duvansky Selsoviet, Duvansky District, Bashkortostan, Russia. The population was 16 as of 2010. There is 1 street.

== Geography ==
Kutrasovka is located 35 km northwest of Mesyagutovo (the district's administrative centre) by road. Lemazy is the nearest rural locality.
