= Ariyevo =

Ariyevo Ариево
- Village
- Location within Bashkortostan Location within Russia
- Coordinates: 55°36′N 58°12′E
- Country: Russia
- Region: Bashkortostan
- District: Duvansky District
- Time zone: UTC+5:00

Ariyevo (Russian: Ариево; Bashkir: Арый, Arıy) is a rural locality (a village) and the administrative centre of Ariyevsky Selsoviet, Duvansky District, Bashkortostan, Russia. The population was 385 as of 2010. There are 4 streets.

== Geography ==
Ariyevo is located 13 km north of Mesyagutovo (the district's administrative centre) by road. Mulkatovo is the nearest rural locality.
