= Salyevka =

Salyevka Сальевка
- Selo
- Location within Bashkortostan Location within Russia
- Coordinates: 55°53′N 57°57′E
- Country: Russia
- Region: Bashkortostan
- District: Duvansky District
- Time zone: UTC+5:00

Salyevka (Russian: Сальевка; Bashkir: Салғыя, Salğıya) is a rural locality (a selo) and the administrative centre of Salyevsky Selsoviet, Duvansky District, Bashkortostan, Russia. The population was 871 as of 2010. There are 5 streets.

== Geography ==
Salyevka is located 55 km northwest of Mesyagutovo (the district's administrative centre) by road. Yaroslavka is the nearest rural locality.
