= Ulkundy =

Ulkundy Улькунды
- Selo
- Location within Bashkortostan Location within Russia
- Coordinates: 55°39′N 57°58′E
- Country: Russia
- Region: Bashkortostan
- District: Duvansky District
- Time zone: UTC+5:00

Ulkundy (Russian: Улькунды; Bashkir: Өлкөндө, Ölköndö) is a rural locality (a selo) and the administrative centre of Ulkundinsky Selsoviet, Duvansky District, Bashkortostan, Russia. The population was 1,255 as of 2010. There are 14 streets.

== Geography ==
Ulkundy is located 22 km northwest of Mesyagutovo (the district's administrative centre) by road. Duvan is the nearest rural locality.
