= Yezhovka, Duvansky District, Republic of Bashkortostan =

Yezhovka Ежовка
- Selo
- Location within Bashkortostan Location within Russia
- Coordinates: 55°31′N 57°38′E
- Country: Russia
- Region: Bashkortostan
- District: Duvansky District
- Time zone: UTC+5:00

Yezhovka (Russian: Ежовка) is a rural locality (a selo) in Mikhaylovsky Selsoviet, Duvansky District, Bashkortostan, Russia. The population was 8 as of 2010. There are 2 streets.

== Geography ==
Yezhovka is located 46 km west of Mesyagutovo (the district's administrative centre) by road. Tashaulovo is the nearest rural locality.
