= Abdrashitovo, Duvansky District, Bashkortostan =

Abdrashitovo Абдрашитово Әбдрәшит Äbdräşit
- Village
- Location within Bashkortostan Location within Russia
- Coordinates: 55°36′N 58°18′E
- Country: Russia
- Region: Bashkortostan
- District: Duvansky District
- Time zone: UTC+5:00

Abdrashitovo (Russian: Абдрашитово; Bashkir: Әбдрәшит, Äbdräşit) is a rural locality (a village) in Mesyagutovsky Selsoviet of Duvansky District, Bashkortostan, Russia. The population was 402 as of 2010. There are 4 streets.

== Geography ==
Abdrashitovo is located 10 km northeast of Mesyagutovo (the district's administrative centre) by road. Karanayevo is the nearest rural locality.
