= Rukhtino =

Rukhtino Рухтино
- Selo
- Location within Bashkortostan Location within Russia
- Coordinates: 55°27′N 58°22′E
- Country: Russia
- Region: Bashkortostan
- District: Duvansky District
- Time zone: UTC+5:00

Rukhtino (Russian: Рухтино) is a rural locality (a selo) and the administrative centre of Rukhtinsky Selsoviet, Duvansky District, Bashkortostan, Russia. The population was 676 as of 2010. There are 7 streets.

== Geography ==
Rukhtino is located 14 km southeast of Mesyagutovo (the district's administrative centre) by road. Anzyak is the nearest rural locality.
