= Tastuba =

Tastuba Тастуба
- Selo
- Location within Bashkortostan Location within Russia
- Coordinates: 55°45′N 57°53′E
- Country: Russia
- Region: Bashkortostan
- District: Duvansky District
- Time zone: UTC+5:00

Tastuba (Russian: Тастуба; Bashkir: Таҙтүбә, Taźtübä) is a rural locality (a selo) in Voznesensky Selsoviet, Duvansky District, Bashkortostan, Russia. The population was 474 in 2015, down from 1,148 as of 2010. There are 9 streets.

== Geography ==
Tastuba is located 37 km northwest of Mesyagutovo (the district's administrative centre) by road. Voznesenka is the nearest rural locality.
