= Yaroslavka, Republic of Bashkortostan =

Yaroslavka Ярославка
- Selo
- Location within Bashkortostan Location within Russia
- Coordinates: 55°51′N 57°58′E
- Country: Russia
- Region: Bashkortostan
- District: Duvansky District
- Time zone: UTC+5:00

Yaroslavka (Russian: Яросла́вка) is a rural locality (a selo) and the administrative centre of Yaroslavsky Selsoviet, Duvansky District, Bashkortostan, Russia. The population was 2,301 as of 2010. There are twenty streets.

== Geography ==
Yaroslavka is located 50 km northwest of Mesyagutovo (the district's administrative centre) by road. Voznesenka is the nearest rural locality.
