= Ust-Ayaz =

Ust-Ayaz Усть-Аяз
- Village
- Location within Bashkortostan Location within Russia
- Coordinates: 56°04′N 57°35′E
- Country: Russia
- Region: Bashkortostan
- District: Duvansky District
- Time zone: UTC+5:00

Ust-Ayaz (Russian: Усть-Аяз; Bashkir: Усть-Әйәҙ, Ust-Äyäź) is a rural locality (a village) in Duvansky District, Bashkortostan, Russia. The population was 227 as of 2010. There are 5 streets.

== Geography ==
Ust-Ayaz is located 104 km northwest of Mesyagutovo (the district's administrative centre) by road. Zaimka is the nearest rural locality.
