= Mulkatovo =

Mulkatovo Мулькатово
- Village
- Location within Bashkortostan Location within Russia
- Coordinates: 55°36′N 58°12′E
- Country: Russia
- Region: Bashkortostan
- District: Duvansky District
- Time zone: UTC+5:00

Mulkatovo (Russian: Мулькатово; Bashkir: Мөлкәт, Mölkät) is a rural locality (a village) in Ariyevsky Selsoviet, Duvansky District, Bashkortostan, Russia. The population was 207 as of 2010. There is 1 street.

== Geography ==
Mulkatovo is located 11 km northwest of Mesyagutovo (the district's administrative centre) by road. Ariyevo is the nearest rural locality.
