= Chertan, Republic of Bashkortostan =

Chertan Чертан
- Selo
- Location within Bashkortostan Location within Russia
- Coordinates: 55°43′N 57°53′E
- Country: Russia
- Region: Bashkortostan
- District: Duvansky District
- Time zone: UTC+5:00

Chertan (Russian: Чертан; Bashkir: Суртан, Surtan) is a rural locality (a selo) in Duvansky Selsoviet, Duvansky District, Bashkortostan, Russia. The population was 242 as of 2010. There are 3 streets.

== Geography ==
Chertan is located 32 km northwest of Mesyagutovo (the district's administrative centre) by road. Duvan is the nearest rural locality.
