= Novonadezhdino =

Novonadezhdino Новонадеждино
- Selo
- Location within Bashkortostan Location within Russia
- Coordinates: 55°10′N 56°05′E
- Country: Russia
- Region: Bashkortostan
- District: Blagoveshchensky District

Population (2010)
  - Total: 770
- Time zone: UTC+5:00
- Postal code: 435444

Novonadezhdino (Russian: Новонадеждино) is a rural locality (a selo) and the administrative centre of Novonadezhdinsky Selsoviet, Blagoveshchensky District, Bashkortostan, Russia. The population was 770 as of 2010. There are 5 streets.

== Geography ==
Novonadezhdino is located 23 km northeast of Blagoveshchensk (the district's administrative centre) by road. Mikhaylovka is the nearest rural locality.
