= Mikhaylovka, Duvansky District, Republic of Bashkortostan =

Mikhaylovka Михайловка
- Selo
- Location within Bashkortostan Location within Russia
- Coordinates: 55°34′N 57°55′E
- Country: Russia
- Region: Bashkortostan
- District: Duvansky District
- Time zone: UTC+5:00

Mikhaylovka (Russian: Михайловка) is a rural locality (a selo) and the administrative centre of Mikhaylovsky Selsoviet, Duvansky District, Bashkortostan, Russia. The population was 994 as of 2010. There are 11 streets.

== Geography ==
Mikhaylovka is located 23 km northwest of Mesyagutovo (the district's administrative centre) by road. Ignashkino is the nearest rural locality.
