= Bayguzhino =

Bayguzhino Байгужино
- Village
- Location within Bashkortostan Location within Russia
- Coordinates: 52°04′N 57°52′E
- Country: Russia
- Region: Bashkortostan
- District: Zilairsky District
- Time zone: UTC+5:00

Bayguzhino (Russian: Байгужино; Bashkir: Байғужа, Bayğuja) is a rural locality or village in Verkhnegaleyevsky Selsoviet, Zilairsky District, Bashkortostan, Russia. The population was 253 as of 2010.

== Geography ==
Bayguzhino has only two streets, and is connected by another road to the district's administrative centre, Zilair, located 126 km southeast of the village. Mikhaylovka is the nearest rural locality.
