= Mikhaylovsky District, Primorsky Krai =

Mikhaylovsky District Михайловский район (Russian)
- District
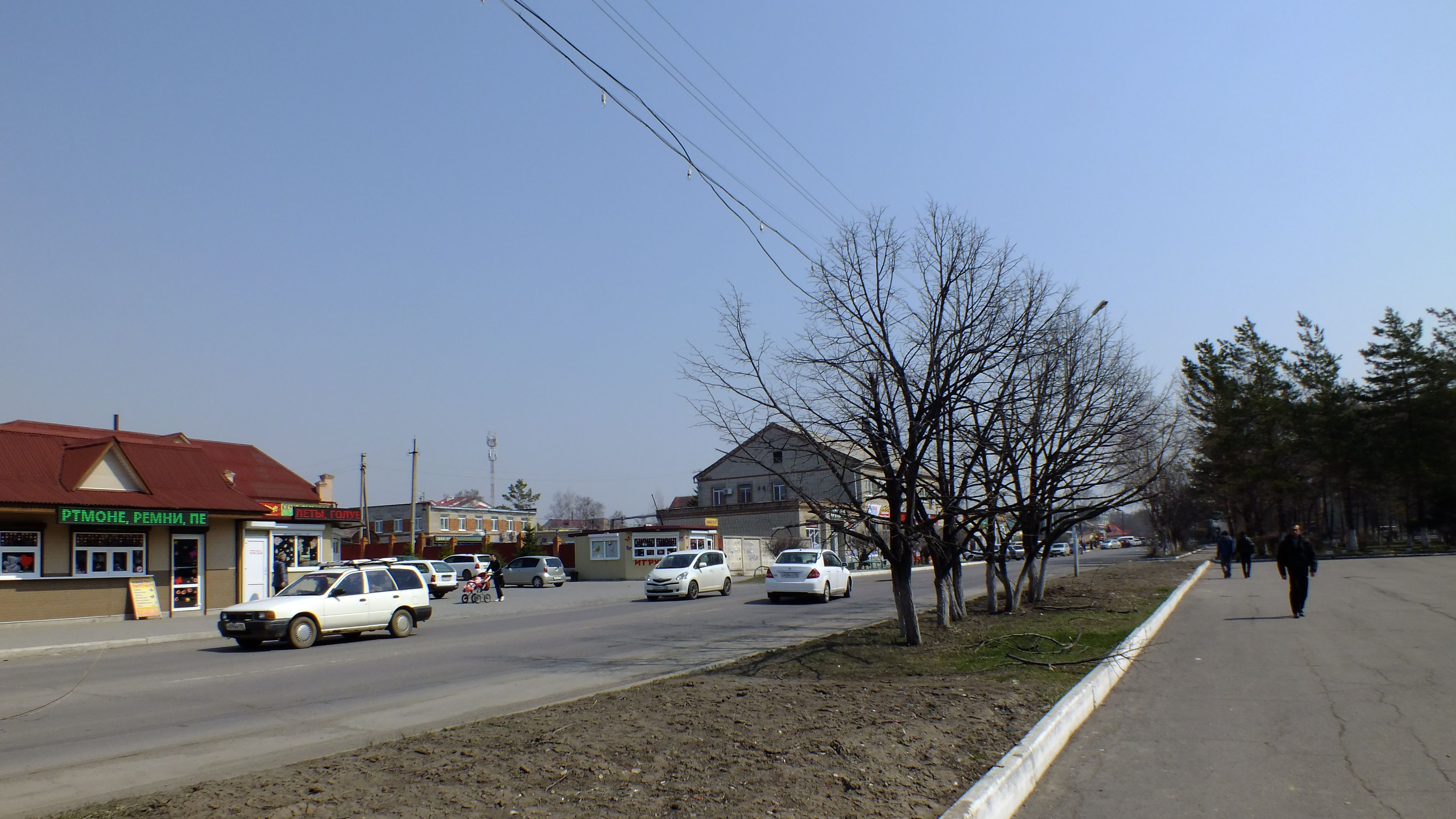
- Mikhailovka, Mikhaylovsky District

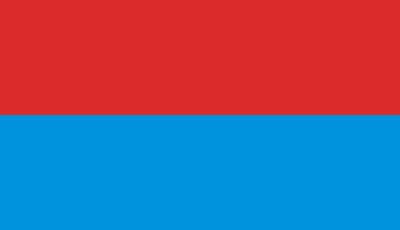
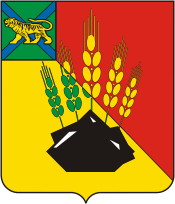
- Flag Coat of arms
- Location of Mikhaylovsky District in Primorsky Krai
- Coordinates: 44°N 132°E
- Country: Russia
- Federal subject: Primorsky Krai
- Established: January 4, 1926
- Administrative center: Mikhaylovka

Area
  - Total: 2,741.4 km^{2} (1,058.5 sq mi)

Population (2010 Census)
  - Total: 34,437
  - Density: 12.562/km^{2} (32.535/sq mi)
  - Urban: 22.8%
  - Rural: 77.2%

Administrative structure
  - Inhabited localities: 1 urban-type settlements, 30 rural localities

Municipal structure
  - Municipally incorporated as: Mikhaylovsky Municipal District
  - Municipal divisions: 1 urban settlements, 6 rural settlements
- Time zone: UTC+10 (MSK+7)
- OKTMO ID: 05620000
- Website: http://mikhprim.ru/

Mikhaylovsky District (Russian: Миха́йловский райо́н) is an administrative and municipal district (raion), one of the twenty-two in Primorsky Krai, Russia. It is located in the southwest of the krai. The area of the district is 2,741.4 square kilometers (1,058.5 sq mi). Its administrative center is the rural locality (a selo) of Mikhaylovka. Population: 34,437 (2010 census); 37,541 (2002 census); 44,150 (1989 Soviet census). The population of Mikhaylovka accounts for 26.6% of the district's total population.

It includes Novoshakhtinsky () and Kremovo, whose airfield was abandoned in 1998.

== History ==
The district was formed on January 4, 1926.

== Notable residents ==
- Alexander Kabiskoy (1920–1950), Soviet flying ace, Hero of the Soviet Union, born in Mikhaylovka
- Boris Silayev (born 1946 in Lyalichi), Kyrgyz politician
