= Alexander Kobiskoy =

Soviet Air Force flying ace

Alexander Sergeyevich Kabiskoy
- Александр Сергеевич Кабиской
- Born: 15 July 1920; Mikhailovka, Far Eastern Republic
- Died: 15 March 1950 (aged 29)
- Military career
- Allegiance: Soviet Union
- Branch: Soviet Air Force
- Service years: 1938–50
- Rank: Major
- Unit: 721st Fighter Aviation Regiment
- Conflicts: World War II; First Battle of Voronezh; Second Battle of Voronezh; Battle of Kursk; Operation Kutuzov; Battle of the Dnieper; Operation Bagration; Vistula-Oder Offensive; East Pomeranian Offensive; Berlin Offensive
- Awards: Hero of the Soviet Union

Alexander Sergeyevich Kabiskoy (Russian: Александр Сергеевич Кабиской; 15 July 1920 – 15 March 1950) was a Soviet Air Force major, flying ace and Hero of the Soviet Union. Awarded the title on 1 July 1944 for his initial victories, by the end of the war his tally consisted of 16 solo aircraft shootdowns plus one aerostat. Postwar, he continued to serve in the Air Force and died in a flying accident in 1950.

== Early life ==
Kabiskoy was born on 15 July 1920 in the village of Mikhailovka in what is now Primorsky Krai to a peasant family. After graduating from eight grades of school he studied at a medical college in Vladivostok. He was drafted into the Red Army in 1938 and went on to graduate from the Bataysk Military Aviation School of Pilots in 1940.

== World War II ==
Kabiskoy fought in World War II from October 1941. He became a Lavochkin-Gorbunov-Gudkov LaGG-3 pilot in the 721st Fighter Aviation Regiment. The regiment provided air defense for Gorky. In December it moved to provide air defense in the Rybinsk area. In early July 1942, the regiment was moved to the Bryansk Front and Kabiskoy took part in the fought in the unsuccessful defense of Voronezh. On 21 October 1942, he was escorting 14 Il-2s over the Kursk airfield when he was attacked by five Bf 109s. Kabiskoy shot down one, enabling the Il-2s to perform their mission. For his actions Kabiskoy received thanks from the commander of the 15th Air Army. Between January and February 1943 he fought in the operation to retake Voronezh. While with the Bryansk Front Kabiskoy shot down two Messerschmitt Bf 109 fighters and two Junkers Ju 88 bombers. On 23 February, Kabiskoy and his wingman shot down an Fw 190, preventing eight Il-2s of the 217th Attack Aviation Regiment from suffering any losses. On 27 February, Kabiskoy led the fighter escort for an Ilyushin Il-2 attack on the Oryol Western airfield, which reportedly destroyed 30 Ju 88s. For his performance of the escort Kabiskoy was thanked by the commander of the 15th Air Army. In July and August 1943 Kabiskoy participated in the Battle of Kursk and the subsequent Operation Kutuzov. On 5 July he shot down an Fw 190 while escorting eight Il-2s, which were attacked by 6 Fw 190s. His wingman claimed another Fw 190. On 11 July, Kabiskoy received the Order of the Patriotic War 1st class. In aerial combat over the Kursk bulge, Kabiskoy shot down another Ju 88 and two Focke-Wulf Fw 190 fighters while flying the Lavochkin La-5.

In August and September 1943, Kabiskoy fought in the Chernigov-Pripyat Offensive. In November he participated in the Gomel-Rechitsa Offensive. On 15 September he was awarded the Order of the Red Banner. Kabiskoy provided air cover during the Kalinkovichi-Mozyr Offensive in January 1944 and the Rogachev-Zhlobin Offensive in February. Around this period Kabiskoy joined the Communist Party of the Soviet Union. During the summer of 1944, he fought in the Bobruysk Offensive, Minsk Offensive and the Lublin–Brest Offensive, part of Operation Bagration. On 1 July, he was awarded the title Hero of the Soviet Union and the Order of Lenin for making 314 sorties in 47 air battles and totaling 16 shootdowns. From January 1945 Kabiskoy fought in the Warsaw-Poznan Offensive, part of the Vistula–Oder Offensive, and gained his last shootdown (and only one in 1945) on 16 April 1945. Between February and April he participated in the East Pomeranian Offensive. In April and May he fought in the Berlin Offensive. On 16 April he shot down an Fw 190 southeast of Sachsendorf while flying the Lavochkin La-7. During the war, Kabiskoy made 342 sorties, during which he shot down a total of 16 enemy aircraft, including 12 Fw 190s, one Bf 109, two Ju 88s, and two Focke-Wulf Fw 189s. Kabiskoy also shot down an aerostat on 23 February 1944.

== Postwar ==
Postwar, Kabiskoy continued to serve in the Soviet Air Force. On 15 March 1950 he was killed in a flying accident. Kabiskoy was buried in Mikhailovka, where there is a street named for him.

== Awards ==
- Hero of the Soviet Union (1 July 1944)
- Order of Lenin (1 July 1944)
- Three Order of the Red Banner (5 November 1942, 15 September 1943, and 2 March 1944)
- Order of Alexander Nevsky (4 June 1945)
- Order of the Patriotic War 1st class (11 July 1943)
