= Verkhny Frolovsky =

Verkhny Frolovsky Верхний Фроловский
- Village
- Location within Bashkortostan Location within Russia
- Coordinates: 54°36′N 57°07′E
- Country: Russia
- Region: Bashkortostan
- District: Arkhangelsky District
- Time zone: UTC+5:00

Verkhny Frolovsky (Russian: Верхний Фроловский; Bashkir: Үрге Фроловка, Ürge Frolovka) is a rural locality (a village) in Inzersky Selsoviet, Arkhangelsky District, Bashkortostan, Russia. The population was 28 as of 2010. There is 1 street.

== Geography ==
Verkhny Frolovsky is located 40 km northeast of Arkhangelskoye (the district's administrative centre) by road. Mikhaylovka is the nearest rural locality.
