= Novoshakhtinsky =

Novoshakhtinsky Новоша́хтинский
- Urban-type settlement
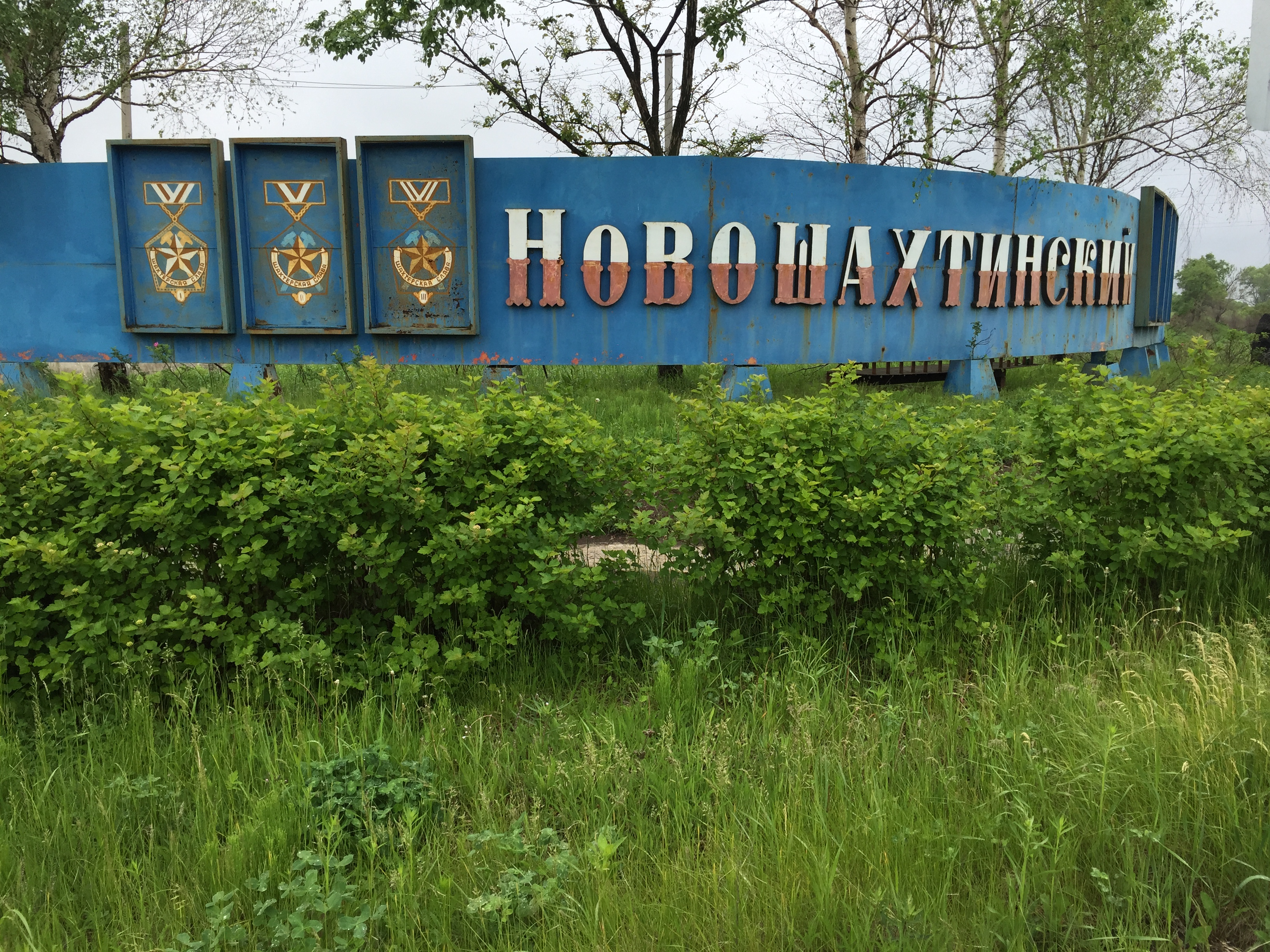
- Town Sign Novoshakhtinsky
- Interactive map of Novoshakhtinsky
- Location of Novoshakhtinsky Novoshakhtinsky (Primorsky Krai)
- Coordinates: 43°58′20″N 132°07′24″E
- Country: Russia
- Federal subject: Primorsky Krai
- Founded: 1967

Population (2010 Census)
  - Total: 7,841
  - Estimate (2023): 7,049 (−10.1%)

Administrative status
  - Capital of: Pozharsky District
- Time zone: UTC+10 (MSK+7)
- Postal code: 692656
- OKTMO ID: 05620154051

Novoshakhtinsky (Russian: Новоша́хтинский) is an urban locality (an urban-type settlement) in Mikhaylovsky District of Primorsky Krai, Russia. Population: 7,841 (2010 census); 8,288 (2002 census); 8,915 (1989 Soviet census).. The Trans-Siberian railroad passes through the town.

== History ==
Urban-type settlement status was granted to Novoshakhtinsky in 1967.

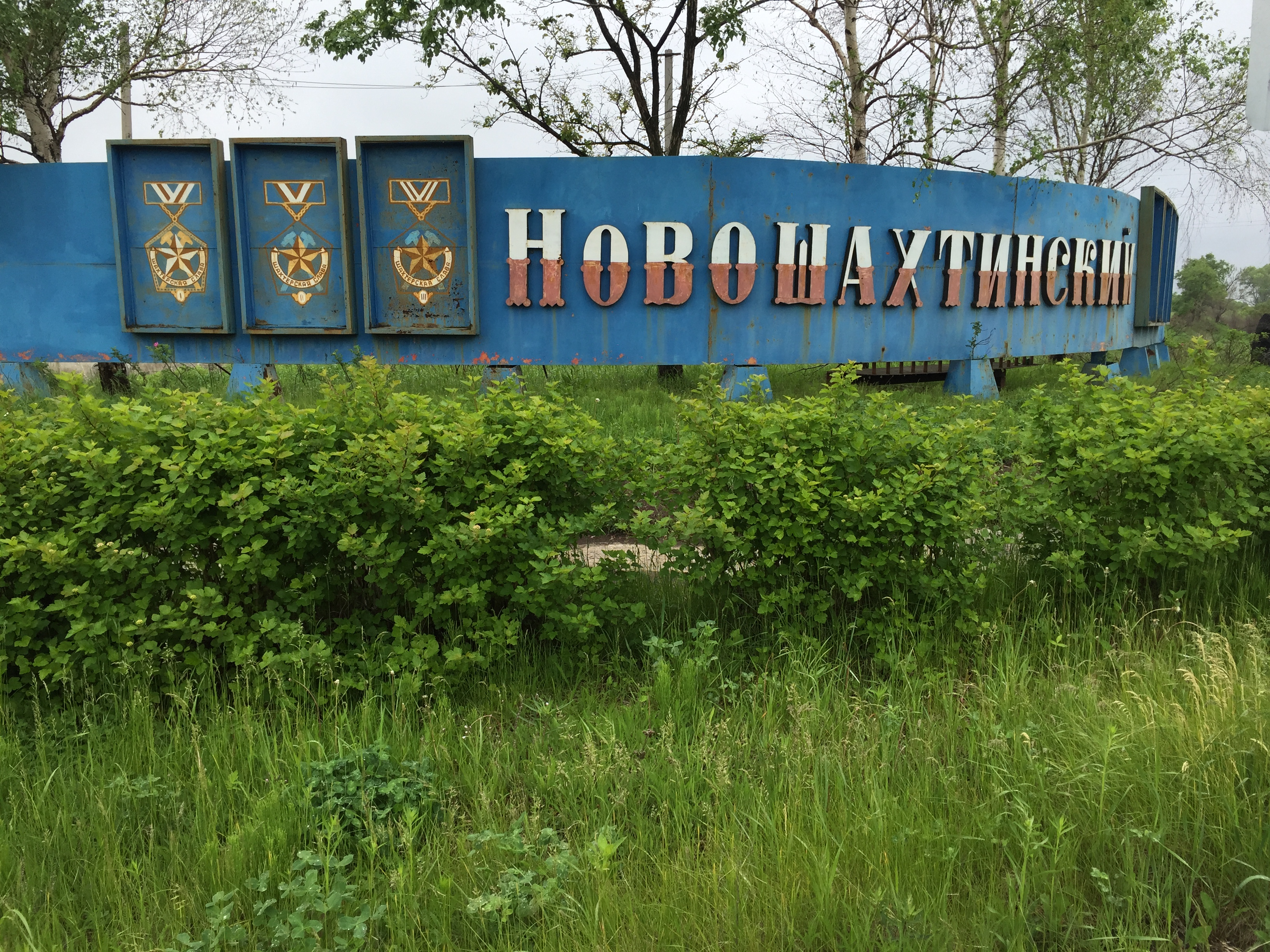
This is the Welcome sign to the township of Novoshakhtinsky. The medals were awarded to the workers of the town for their handwork in service to the Soviet Union. An interesting and important historical artefact.

== Economy ==
The economy of Novoshakhtinsky is primarily based on coal mining. Following the 2008 global financial crisis, a decline in international commodity prices led to reduced demand and lower prices for coal. Because Novoshakhtinsky is a monotown heavily reliant on this single industry, the downturn significantly impacted both the mining operations and the local population. Consequently, the settlement experiences outward migration, particularly among youth and skilled workers who relocate to larger urban economic centers such as Vladivostok, Moscow, and St. Petersburg.

Geographically, the settlement is positioned near Vladivostok and regional East Asian trade markets, including China and South Korea. Novoshakhtinsky possesses established municipal infrastructure, including housing, roads, and schools, though regional assessments note that these facilities require modernization.

== Miscellaneous ==
There is a music school and an orphanage in Novoshakhtinsky.
