= Mikhaylovka, Skvorchikhinsky Selsoviet, Ishimbaysky District, Republic of Bashkortostan =

Mikhaylovka Михайловка
- Village
- Location within Bashkortostan Location within Russia
- Coordinates: 53°18′N 56°00′E
- Country: Russia
- Region: Bashkortostan
- District: Ishimbaysky District
- Time zone: UTC+5:00

Mikhaylovka (Russian: Михайловка) is a rural locality (a village) in Skvorchikhinsky Selsoviet, Ishimbaysky District, Bashkortostan, Russia. The population was 3 as of 2010.

== Geography ==
It is located 28 km from Ishimbay and 10 km from Skvorchikha.

== Geology and paleontology ==
Outcrops of the Permian period (Severodvinian stage), composed by limestones, conglomerates, sandstones, siltstones, marls and dolomites, are located to the southwest of the village, on the right bank of the Belaya River. Fossils of the ostracod genera Paleodarwinula and Suchonellina were found in the siltstones of these deposits.
