= Asino =

Town in Tomsk Oblast, Russia

Asino Асино
- Town under district jurisdiction
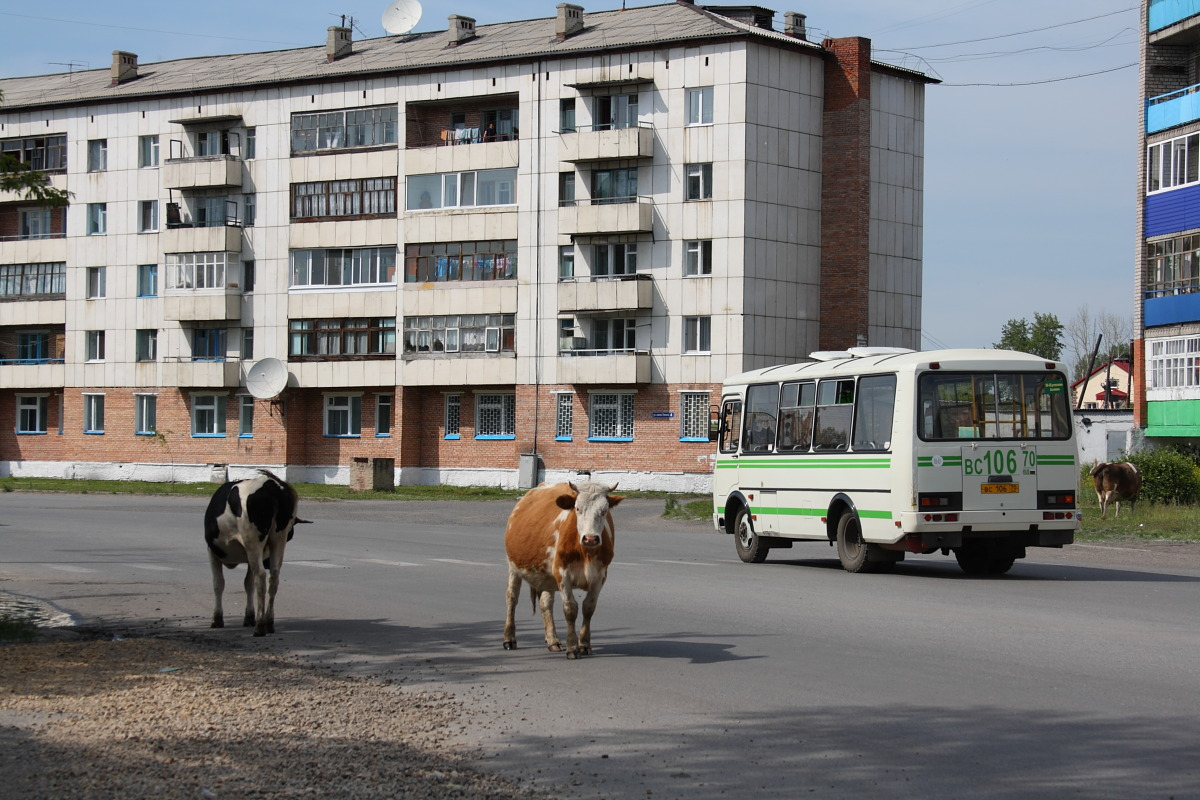
- Street scene in Asino
- Interactive map of Asino
- Location of Asino Asino (Tomsk Oblast)
- Coordinates: 57°00′N 86°08′E
- Country: Russia
- Federal subject: Tomsk Oblast
- Administrative district: Asinovsky District
- Founded: 1896
- Town status since: 1952
- Elevation: 109 m (358 ft)

Population (2010 Census)
  - Total: 25,618
  - Estimate (2021): 24,913 (−2.8%)

Administrative status
  - Capital of: Asinovsky District

Municipal status
  - Municipal district: Asinovsky Municipal District
  - Urban settlement: Asinovskoye Urban Settlement
  - Capital of: Asinovsky Municipal District, Asinovskoye Urban Settlement
- Time zone: UTC+7 (MSK+4)
- Postal codes: 636840–636845, 636849
- Dialing code: +7 38241
- OKTMO ID: 69608101001
- Website: gorod.asino.ru

Asino (Russian: А́сино) is a town and the administrative centre of Asinovsky District in Tomsk Oblast, Russia. Population: 25,618 (2010 census); 28,068 (2002 census); 33,471 (1989 Soviet census). It was previously known as Kseniyevsky (until 1930).

== History ==
It was founded in 1896 as the transmigratory settlement of Kseniyevsky (Ксениевский); in 1930 the construction of the railway to Tomsk started. The settlement was renamed Asino in 1930 after the railway station, and the town status was granted to it in 1952.

== Administrative and municipal status ==
Within the framework of administrative divisions, Asino serves as the administrative centre of Asinovsky District, to which it is directly subordinated. As a municipal division, the town of Asino is incorporated within Asinovsky Municipal District as Asinovskoye Urban Settlement.

== Economy ==
There is a port on the Chulym River and a railway station.

Important economic industries include forestry, wood working, large scale wood shipping, and tractor repair. In addition, the area also has combines (meat and milk) and a flax mill.

Agriculture in Asino in dominated by rye, wheat, flax grasses, and breeding cattle and pigs. Mineral deposits of peat, sand, and clay are found in the vicinity.

== Sources ==
- Государственная Дума Томской области. Закон №271-ОЗ от 22 декабря 2009 г. «Об административно-территориальном устройстве Томской области», в ред. Закона №153-ОЗ от 17 ноября 2014 г. «Об упразднении отдельных административно-территориальных единиц Томской области и о внесении изменений в отдельные законодательные акты Томской области в связи с упразднением отдельных административно-территориальных единиц Томской области». Вступил в силу по истечении 10 дней после дня официального опубликования. Опубликован: "Томские новости", №51, 24 декабря 2009 г. (State Duma of Tomsk Oblast. Law #271-OZ of December 22, 2009 On the Administrative-Territorial Structure of Tomsk Oblast, as amended by the Law #153-OZ of November 17, 2014 On Abolishing Several Administrative-Territorial Units in Tomsk Oblast and on Amending Various Legislative Acts of Tomsk Oblast Due to the Abolition of Several Administrative-Territorial Units in Tomsk Oblast. Effective as of the day which is 10 days after the day of the official publication.).
- Государственная Дума Томской области. Закон №193-ОЗ от 9 сентября 2004 г. «О наделении статусом муниципального района, поселения (городского, сельского) и установлении границ муниципальных образований на территории Асиновского района», в ред. Закона №76-ОЗ от 19 июня 2014 г. «О внесении изменений в отдельные законодательные акты Томской области в части уточнения статуса населённых пунктов, входящих в состав городских, сельских поселений». Вступил в силу по истечении 10 дней со дня официального опубликования. Опубликован: "Официальные ведомости", №27(103), 10 сентября 2004 г. (State Duma of Tomsk Oblast. Law #193-OZ of September 9, 2004 On Granting the Status of a Municipal District, Settlement (Urban, Rural) to and on Establishing the Borders of the Municipal Formations on the Territory of Asinovsky District, as amended by the Law #76-OZ of June 19, 2014 On Amending Parts of Various Legislative Acts of Tomsk Oblast Dealing with the Clarification of the Status of Inhabited Localities Within Urban, Rural Settlements. Effective as of after 10 days from the day of the official publication have passed.).
