= Mikhaylovka, Tretyakovsky District, Altai Krai =

Mikhaylovka Михайловка
- Selo
- Location within Altai Krai Location within Russia
- Coordinates: 50°49′N 81°57′E
- Country: Russia
- Region: Altai Krai
- District: Tretyakovsky District
- Time zone: UTC+7:00

Mikhaylovka (Russian: Михайловка) is a rural locality (a selo) in Tretyakovsky Selsoviet, Tretyakovsky District, Altai Krai, Russia. The population was 531 as of 2013. There are 4 streets.

== Geography ==
Mikhaylovka is located 27 km south of Staroaleyskoye (the district's administrative centre) by road. Tretyakovo is the nearest rural locality.
