= Skvorchikha =

Skvorchikha Скворчиха
- Selo
- Location within Bashkortostan Location within Russia
- Coordinates: 53°18′N 56°07′E
- Country: Russia
- Region: Bashkortostan
- District: Ishimbaysky District
- Time zone: UTC+5:00

Skvorchikha (Russian: Скворчиха) is a rural locality (a selo) and the administrative centre of Skvorchikhinsky Selsoviet, Ishimbaysky District, Bashkortostan, Russia. The population was 459 as of 2010. There are 7 streets.

== Geography ==
Skvorchikha is located 21 km southeast of Ishimbay (the district's administrative centre) by road. Novonikolayevka is the nearest rural locality.

== Geology and paleontology ==
Sediments of the Urzhumian and Severodvinian stages (Permian period) are present in the bank cliffs of the Yurgabashka River, near Skvorchikha. Fossils of ostracods of Paleodarwinula and Prasuchonell (sic) genera were found in the Urzhumian deposits. Charred remains of plants have been found in clay, sand and siltstone rocks of the same stage.
