= Mikhaylovka, Abzelilovsky District, Republic of Bashkortostan =

Mikhaylovka Михайловка
- Selo
- Location within Bashkortostan Location within Russia
- Coordinates: 53°26′N 58°43′E
- Country: Russia
- Region: Bashkortostan
- District: Abzelilovsky District
- Time zone: UTC+5:00

Mikhaylovka (Russian: Михайловка) is a rural locality (a selo) and the administrative center of Tashtimerovsky Selsoviet, Abzelilovsky District, Bashkortostan, Russia. The population was 1,103 as of 2010. There are 15 streets.

== Geography ==
Mikhaylovka is located 27 km northeast of Askarovo (the district's administrative centre) by road. Tashtimerovo is the nearest rural locality.
