= Mikhaylovka, Aurgazinsky District, Republic of Bashkortostan =

Mikhaylovka Михайловка
- Village
- Location within Bashkortostan Location within Russia
- Coordinates: 53°57′N 55°37′E
- Country: Russia
- Region: Bashkortostan
- District: Aurgazinsky District
- Time zone: UTC+5:00

Mikhaylovka (Russian: Михайловка) is a rural locality (a village) and the administrative centre of Mikhaylovsky Selsoviet, Aurgazinsky District, Bashkortostan, Russia. The population was 267 as of 2010. There are 2 streets.

== Geography ==
Mikhaylovka is located 22 km southwest of Tolbazy (the district's administrative centre) by road. Igenche is the nearest rural locality.
