= Mikhaylovka, Ust-Kalmansky District, Altai Krai =

Mikhaylovka Михайловка
- Selo
- Location within Altai Krai Location within Russia
- Coordinates: 51°57′N 83°48′E
- Country: Russia
- Region: Altai Krai
- District: Ust-Kalmansky District
- Time zone: UTC+7:00

Mikhaylovka (Russian: Михайловка) is a rural locality (a selo) and the administrative center of Mikhaylovsky Selsoviet, Ust-Kalmansky District, Altai Krai, Russia. The population was 1,419 as of 2013. There are 18 streets.

== Geography ==
Mikhaylovka is located 57 km southeast of Ust-Kalmanka (the district's administrative centre) by road. Antonyevka is the nearest rural locality.
