= Mikhaylovka, Kuyurgazinsky District, Republic of Bashkortostan =

Mikhaylovka Михайловка
- Village
- Location within Bashkortostan Location within Russia
- Coordinates: 52°57′N 55°12′E
- Country: Russia
- Region: Bashkortostan
- District: Kuyurgazinsky District
- Time zone: UTC+5:00

Mikhaylovka (Russian: Михайловка) is a rural locality (a village) in Zyak-Ishmetovsky Selsoviet, Kuyurgazinsky District, Bashkortostan, Russia. The population was 256 as of 2010. There are 4 streets.

== Geography ==
Mikhaylovka is located 63 km northwest of Yermolayevo (the district's administrative centre) by road. Kiryushkino is the nearest rural locality.
