= Mikhaylovka, Fatezhsky District, Kursk Oblast =

Rural locality in Kursk Oblast, Russia

Mikhaylovka Михайловка
- Village
- Interactive map of Mikhaylovka
- Location of Mikhaylovka Mikhaylovka (Kursk Oblast)
- Coordinates: 52°06′38″N 36°02′47″E
- Country: Russia
- Federal subject: Kursk Oblast
- Administrative district: Fatezhsky District
- SelsovietSelsoviet: Bolsheannenkovsky

Population (2010 Census)
  - Total: 74
  - Estimate (2010): 74 (0%)

Municipal status
  - Municipal district: Fatezhsky Municipal District
  - Rural settlement: Bolsheannenkovsky Selsoviet Rural Settlement
- Time zone: UTC+3 (MSK)
- Postal code: 307126
- Dialing code: +7 47144
- OKTMO ID: 38644408141
- Website: мобольшеанненковский.рф

Mikhaylovka (Russian: Михайловка) is a rural locality (Russian: деревня, lit. 'village') in Bolsheannenkovsky Selsoviet Rural Settlement, Fatezhsky District, Kursk Oblast, Russia. The population as of 2010 is 74.
