= Mikhaylovka, Olkhovsky District, Volgograd Oblast =

Mikhaylovka Михайловка
- Selo
- Location within Volgograd Oblast Location within Russia
- Coordinates: 49°46′N 44°25′E
- Country: Russia
- Region: Volgograd Oblast
- District: Olkhovsky District
- Time zone: UTC+4:00

Mikhaylovka (Russian: Миха́йловка) is a rural locality (a selo) in Kamennobrodskoye Rural Settlement, Olkhovsky District, Volgograd Oblast, Russia. The population was 152 as of 2010.

== Geography ==
Mikhaylovka is located in steppe, 16 km southwest of Olkhovka (the district's administrative centre) by road. Goskonyushnya is the nearest rural locality.
