= Mikhaylovka, Arkharinsky District, Amur Oblast =

Mikhaylovka Михайловка
- Selo
- Location within Amur Oblast Location within Russia
- Coordinates: 49°11′N 129°51′E
- Country: Russia
- Region: Amur Oblast
- District: Arkharinsky District
- Time zone: UTC+9:00

Mikhaylovka (Russian: Михайловка) is a rural locality (a selo) in Leninsky Selsoviet of Arkharinsky District, Amur Oblast, Russia. The population was 10 as of 2018. There are 3 streets.

== Geography ==
Mikhaylovka is located 40 km southwest of Arkhara (the district's administrative centre) by road. Leninskoye is the nearest rural locality.
