= Mikhaylovka, Sharansky District, Republic of Bashkortostan =

Mikhaylovka Михайловка
- Village
- Location within Bashkortostan Location within Russia
- Coordinates: 54°55′N 54°15′E
- Country: Russia
- Region: Bashkortostan
- District: Sharansky District
- Time zone: UTC+5:00

Mikhaylovka (Russian: Михайловка) is a rural locality (a village) in Michurinsky Selsoviet, Sharansky District, Bashkortostan, Russia. The population was 138 as of 2010. There are 4 streets.

== Geography ==
Mikhaylovka is located 26 kilometres northeast of Sharan (the district's administrative centre) by road. Novotroitsk is the nearest rural locality.
