= Mikhaylovka, Askinsky District, Republic of Bashkortostan =

Selo in Askinsky District, Bashkortostan, Russia

Mikhaylovka Михайловка
- Selo
- Location within Bashkortostan Location within Russia
- Coordinates: 56°08′N 56°09′E
- Country: Russia
- Region: Bashkortostan
- District: Askinsky District
- Time zone: UTC+5:00

Mikhaylovka (Russian: Михайловка) is a rural locality (a selo) in Kazanchinsky Selsoviet, Askinsky District, Bashkortostan, Russia. The population was 21 as of 2010. There is 1 street.

== Geography ==
Mikhaylovka is located 42 km northwest of Askino (the district's administrative centre) by road. Russkaya Kara is the nearest rural locality.
