= Mikhaylovka, Kantemirovsky District, Voronezh Oblast =

Mikhaylovka Михайловка
- Selo
- Location within Voronezh Oblast Location within Russia
- Coordinates: 49°53′N 39°38′E
- Country: Russia
- Region: Voronezh Oblast
- District: Kantemirovsky District
- Time zone: UTC+3:00

Mikhaylovka (Russian: Михайловка) is a rural locality (a selo) and the administrative center of Mikhaylovskoye Rural Settlement, Kantemirovsky District, Voronezh Oblast, Russia. The population was 928 as of 2010. There are 12 streets.

== Geography ==
Mikhaylovka is located 32 km northwest of Kantemirovka (the district's administrative centre) by road. Shramovka is the nearest rural locality.
