= Mikhaylovka, Bizhbulyaksky District, Republic of Bashkortostan =

Mikhaylovka Михайловка
- Selo
- Location within Bashkortostan Location within Russia
- Coordinates: 53°54′N 54°08′E
- Country: Russia
- Region: Bashkortostan
- District: Bizhbulyaksky District
- Time zone: UTC+5:00

Mikhaylovka (Russian: Михайловка) is a rural locality (a selo) and the administrative centre of Mikhaylovsky Selsoviet, Bizhbulyaksky District, Bashkortostan, Russia. The population was 1,172 as of 2010. There are 19 streets.

== Geography ==
Mikhaylovka is located 34 km north of Bizhbulyak (the district's administrative centre) by road. Ignashkino is the nearest rural locality.
