= Mikhaylovka, Limansky District, Astrakhan Oblast =

Mikhaylovka Михайловка
- Selo
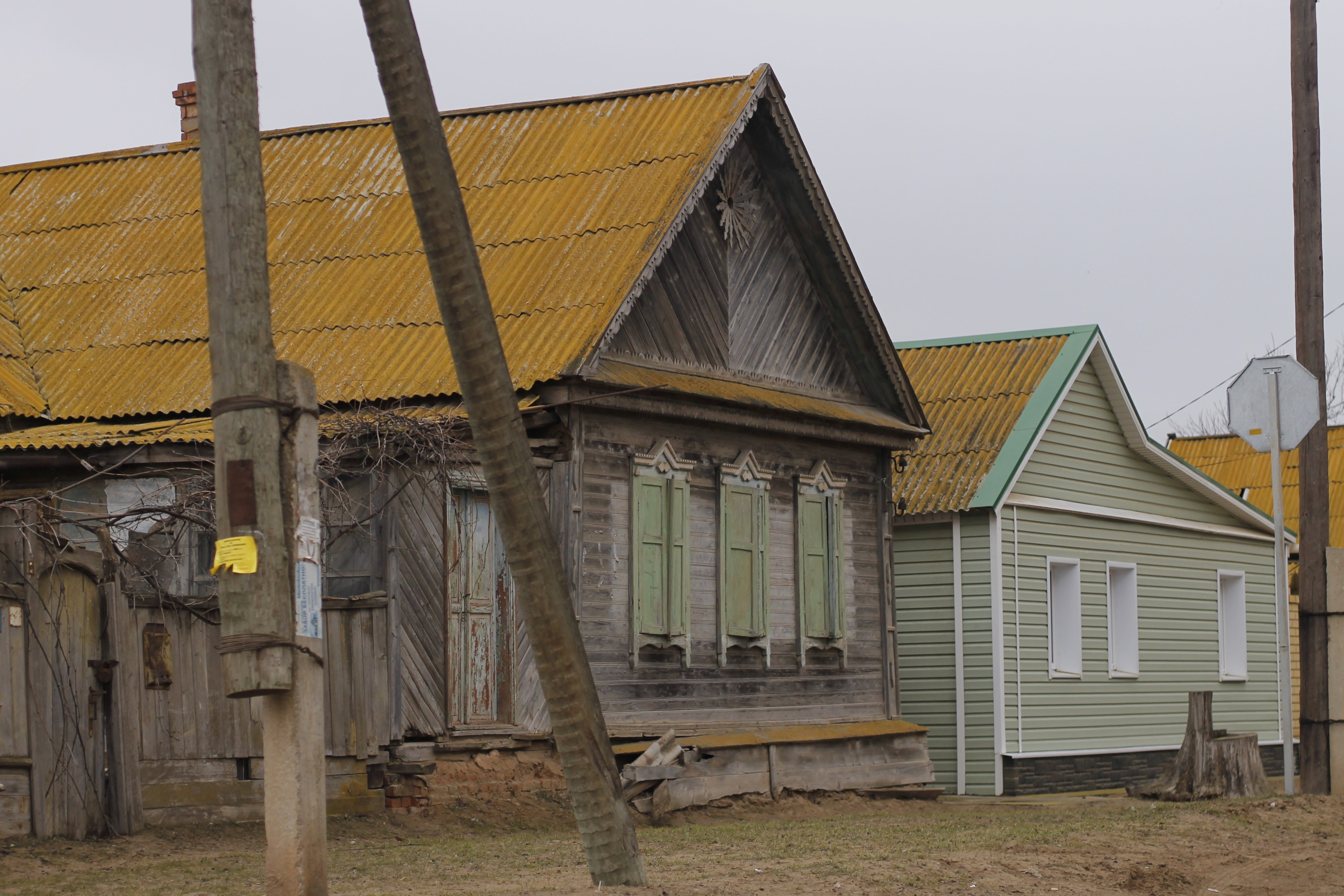

- Location within Astrakhan Oblast Location within Russia
- Coordinates: 45°55′N 47°07′E
- Country: Russia
- Region: Astrakhan Oblast
- District: Limansky District
- Time zone: UTC+4:00

Mikhaylovka (Russian: Михайловка) is a rural locality (a selo) and the administrative center of Mikhaylovsky Selsoviet, Limansky District, Astrakhan Oblast, Russia. The population was 1,165 as of 2010. There are 23 streets.

== Geography ==
Mikhaylovka is located 21 km northwest of Liman (the district's administrative centre) by road. Zenzeli is the nearest rural locality.
