= Mikhaylovka, Mikhaylovsky District, Amur Oblast =

Mikhaylovka Михайловка
- Selo
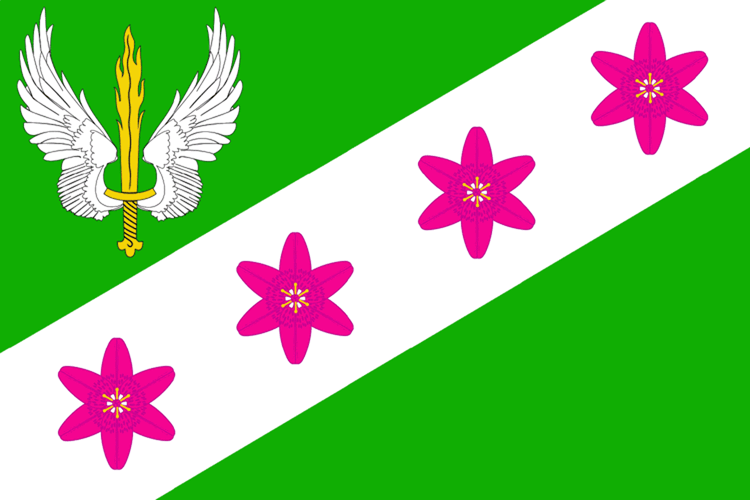
- Flag

- Location within Amur Oblast Location within Russia
- Coordinates: 49°54′N 128°50′E
- Country: Russia
- Region: Amur Oblast
- District: Mikhaylovsky District
- Time zone: UTC+9:00

Mikhaylovka (Russian: Михайловка) is a rural locality (a selo) and the administrative center of Mikhaylovsky Selsoviet of Mikhaylovsky District, Amur Oblast, Russia. The population was 689 as of 2018. There are 14 streets.

== Geography ==
Mikhaylovka is located on the left bank of the Zavitaya River, 47 km north of Poyarkovo (the district's administrative centre) by road. Novogeorgiyevka is the nearest rural locality.
