= Mikhaylovka, Kikvidzensky District, Volgograd Oblast =

Mikhaylovka Михайловка
- Khutor
- Location within Volgograd Oblast Location within Russia
- Coordinates: 50°59′N 43°18′E
- Country: Russia
- Region: Volgograd Oblast
- District: Kikvidzensky District
- Time zone: UTC+4:00

Mikhaylovka (Russian: Михайловка) is a rural locality (a khutor) in Yezhovskoye Rural Settlement, Kikvidzensky District, Volgograd Oblast, Russia. The population was 382 as of 2010. There are 3 streets.

== Geography ==
Mikhaylovka is located in steppe, on Khopyorsko-Buzulukskaya plain, on the left bank of the Svinukha River, 52 km northeast of Preobrazhenskaya (the district's administrative centre) by road. Yezhovka is the nearest rural locality.
