= Mikhaylovka, Vologda Oblast =

Mikhaylovka Михайловка
- Settlement
- Location within Vologda Oblast Location within Russia
- Coordinates: 60°04′N 43°29′E
- Country: Russia
- Region: Vologda Oblast
- District: Totemsky District
- Time zone: UTC+3:00

Mikhaylovka (Russian: Михайловка) is a rural locality (a settlement) in Medvedevskoye Rural Settlement, Totemsky District, Vologda Oblast, Russia. The population was 342 as of 2002.

== Geography ==
Neklyudikha is located 52 km northeast of Totma (the district's administrative centre) by road. Nizhnyaya Pechenga is the nearest rural locality.
