= Mikhaylovka, Kizhinginsky District, Republic of Buryatia =

Mikhaylovka Михайловка
- Selo
- Location within Republic of Buryatia Location within Russia
- Coordinates: 51°53′N 110°28′E
- Country: Russia
- Region: Republic of Buryatia
- District: Kizhinginsky District
- Time zone: UTC+8:00

Mikhaylovka (Russian: Михайловка) is a rural locality (a selo) in Kizhinginsky District, Republic of Buryatia, Russia. The population was 560 as of 2010. There are 7 streets.

== Geography ==
Mikhaylovka is located 49 km east of Kizhinga (the district's administrative centre) by road. Mogsokhon is the nearest rural locality.
