= Mikhaylovka, Zakamensky District, Republic of Buryatia =

Mikhaylovka Михайловка
- Selo
- Location within Republic of Buryatia Location within Russia
- Coordinates: 50°24′N 104°09′E
- Country: Russia
- Region: Republic of Buryatia
- District: Zakamensky District
- Time zone: UTC+8:00

Mikhaylovka (Russian: Михайловка) is a rural locality (a selo) in Zakamensky District, Republic of Buryatia, Russia. The population was 1,122 as of 2010. There are 17 streets.

== Geography ==
Mikhaylovka is located 74 km (46 mi) east of Zakamensk (the district's administrative centre) by road. Ust-Burgaltay is the nearest rural locality.
