= Mikhaylovka, Meleuzovsky District, Republic of Bashkortostan =

Mikhaylovka Михайловка
- Village
- Location within Bashkortostan Location within Russia
- Coordinates: 52°57′N 55°42′E
- Country: Russia
- Region: Bashkortostan
- District: Meleuzovsky District
- Time zone: UTC+5:00

Mikhaylovka (Russian: Михайловка) is a rural locality (a village) in Denisovsky Selsoviet, Meleuzovsky District, Bashkortostan, Russia. The population was 140 as of 2010. There is 1 street.

== Geography ==
Mikhaylovka is located 19 km west of Meleuz (the district's administrative centre) by road. Romanovka is the nearest rural locality.
