= Mikhaylovka, Buzdyaksky District, Republic of Bashkortostan =

Mikhaylovka Михайловка
- Selo
- Location within Bashkortostan Location within Russia
- Coordinates: 54°30′N 54°38′E
- Country: Russia
- Region: Bashkortostan
- District: Buzdyaksky District
- Time zone: UTC+5:00

Mikhaylovka (Russian: Михайловка) is a rural locality (a selo) in Gafuriysky Selsoviet, Buzdyaksky District, Bashkortostan, Russia. The population was 296 as of 2010. There are 3 streets.

== Geography ==
Mikhaylovka is located 13 km southeast of Buzdyak (the district's administrative centre) by road. Novokilimovo is the nearest rural locality.
