= Mikhaylovka, Novousmansky District, Voronezh Oblast =

Mikhaylovka Михайловка
- Village
- Location within Voronezh Oblast Location within Russia
- Coordinates: 51°30′N 39°40′E
- Country: Russia
- Region: Voronezh Oblast
- District: Novousmansky District
- Time zone: UTC+3:00

Mikhaylovka (Russian: Михайловка) is a rural locality (a village) in Timiryazevskoye Rural Settlement, Novousmansky District, Voronezh Oblast, Russia. The population was 688 as of 2010. There are 16 streets.

== Geography ==
Mikhaylovka is located 31 km southeast of Novaya Usman (the district's administrative centre) by road. Sadovy is the nearest rural locality.
