= Mikhaylovka, Suyetsky District, Altai Krai =

Mikhaylovka Михайловка
- Settlement
- Location within Altai Krai Location within Russia
- Coordinates: 53°10′N 80°12′E
- Country: Russia
- Region: Altai Krai
- District: Suyetsky District
- Time zone: UTC+7:00

Mikhaylovka (Russian: Михайловка) is a rural locality (a settlement) in Boronsky Selsoviet, Suyetsky District, Altai Krai, Russia. The population was 160 as of 2013. There are 3 streets.

== Geography ==
Mikhaylovka is located 22 km southeast of Verkh-Suyetka (the district's administrative centre) by road. Ukrainsky is the nearest rural locality.
