= Mikhaylovka, Arkhangelsky District, Republic of Bashkortostan =

Mikhaylovka Михайловка
- Village
- Location within Bashkortostan Location within Russia
- Coordinates: 54°36′N 57°04′E
- Country: Russia
- Region: Bashkortostan
- District: Arkhangelsky District
- Time zone: UTC+5:00

Mikhaylovka (Russian: Михайловка) is a rural locality (a village) in Inzersky Selsoviet, Arkhangelsky District, Bashkortostan, Russia. The population was 77 as of 2010. There is 1 street.

== Geography ==
Mikhaylovka is located 36 km northeast of Arkhangelskoye (the district's administrative centre) by road. Verkhny Frolovsky is the nearest rural locality.
