= Mikhaylovka, Yenotayevsky District, Astrakhan Oblast =

Mikhaylovka Михайловка
- Selo
- Location within Astrakhan Oblast Location within Russia
- Coordinates: 47°22′N 46°50′E
- Country: Russia
- Region: Astrakhan Oblast
- District: Yenotayevsky District
- Time zone: UTC+4:00

Mikhaylovka (Russian: Михайловка) is a rural locality (a selo) in Fyodorovsky Selsoviet of Yenotayevsky District, Astrakhan Oblast, Russia. The population was 286 as of 2010. There are 7 streets.

== Geography ==
Mikhaylovka is located 24 km northwest of Yenotayevka (the district's administrative centre) by road. Fyodorovka is the nearest rural locality.
