= Mikhaylovka, Mazanovsky District, Amur Oblast =

Mikhaylovka Михайловка
- Selo
- Location within Amur Oblast Location within Russia
- Coordinates: 51°27′N 128°40′E
- Country: Russia
- Region: Amur Oblast
- District: Mazanovsky District
- Time zone: UTC+9:00

Mikhaylovka (Russian: Михайловка) is a rural locality (a selo) in Krasnoyarovsky Selsoviet of Mazanovsky District, Amur Oblast, Russia. The population was 106 as of 2018. There are 2 streets.

== Geography ==
Mikhaylovka is located on the right bank of the Birma River, 39 km southwest of Novokiyevsky Uval (the district's administrative centre) by road. Petrovka is the nearest rural locality.
