= Mikhaylovka, Blagoveshchensky District, Altai Krai =

Mikhaylovka Михайловка
- Settlement
- Location within Altai Krai Location within Russia
- Coordinates: 53°02′N 79°56′E
- Country: Russia
- Region: Altai Krai
- District: Blagoveshchensky District
- Time zone: UTC+7:00

Mikhaylovka (Russian: Михайловка) is a rural locality (a settlement) in Shimolinsky Selsoviet, Blagoveshchensky District, Altai Krai, Russia. The population was 157 as of 2013. There are 3 streets.

== Geography ==
Mikhaylovka is located 35 km northeast of Blagoveshchenka (the district's administrative centre) by road. Shimolino is the nearest rural locality.
