= Mikhaylovka, Kuryinsky District, Altai Krai =

Mikhaylovka Михайловка
- Selo
- Location within Altai Krai Location within Russia
- Coordinates: 51°28′N 82°08′E
- Country: Russia
- Region: Altai Krai
- District: Kuryinsky District
- Time zone: UTC+7:00

Mikhaylovka (Russian: Михайловка) is a rural locality (a selo) in Ust-Talovsky Selsoviet, Kuryinsky District, Altai Krai, Russia. The population was 12 as of 2013. There is 1 street.

== Geography ==
Mikhaylovka is located 20 km southwest of Kurya (the district's administrative centre) by road. Ust-Talovka is the nearest rural locality.
