= Mikhaylovka, Blagoveshchensky District, Amur Oblast =

Mikhaylovka Михайловка
- Selo
- Location within Amur Oblast Location within Russia
- Coordinates: 50°38′N 127°22′E
- Country: Russia
- Region: Amur Oblast
- District: Blagoveshchensky District
- Time zone: UTC+9:00

Mikhaylovka (Russian: Михайловка) is a rural locality (a selo) and the administrative center of Mikhaylovsky Selsoviet of Blagoveshchensky District, Amur Oblast, Russia. The population was 587 as of 2018. There are 13 streets.

== Geography ==
Mikhaylovka is near the left bank of the Amur River, 51 km north of Blagoveshchensk (the district's administrative centre) by road. Gryaznushka is the nearest rural locality.
