= Mikhaylovka, Mikhaylovsky Selsoviet, Bakalinsky District, Republic of Bashkortostan =

Mikhaylovka Михайловка
- Selo
- Location within Bashkortostan Location within Russia
- Coordinates: 55°02′N 53°52′E
- Country: Russia
- Region: Bashkortostan
- District: Bakalinsky District
- Time zone: UTC+5:00

Mikhaylovka (Russian: Михайловка) is a rural locality (a selo) and the administrative centre of Mikhaylovsky Selsoviet, Bakalinsky District, Bashkortostan, Russia. The population was 117 as of 2010.

== Geography ==
It is located 18 km from Bakaly.
