= Mikhaylovka, Kamensky District, Altai Krai =

Mikhaylovka Михайловка
- Settlement
- Location within Altai Krai Location within Russia
- Coordinates: 53°55′N 81°46′E
- Country: Russia
- Region: Altai Krai
- District: Kamensky District

Population (2013)
  - Total: 79
- Time zone: UTC+7:00

Mikhaylovka (Russian: Михайловка) is a rural locality (a settlement) in Verkh-Allaksky Selsoviet, Kamensky District, Altai Krai, Russia. The population was 79 as of 2013. There are 2 streets.

== Geography ==
Mikhaylovka is located 38 km northeast of Kamen-na-Obi (the district's administrative centre) by road. Verkh-Allak is the nearest rural locality.
