= Mikhaylovka, Iglinsky District, Republic of Bashkortostan =

Mikhaylovka Михайловка
- Village
- Location within Bashkortostan Location within Russia
- Coordinates: 55°04′N 57°03′E
- Country: Russia
- Region: Bashkortostan
- District: Iglinsky District
- Time zone: UTC+5:00

Mikhaylovka (Russian: Михайловка) is a rural locality (a village) in Krasnovoskhodsky Selsoviet, Iglinsky District, Bashkortostan, Russia. The population was 211 as of 2010. There are 2 streets.

== Geography ==
Mikhaylovka is located 75 km northeast of Iglino (the district's administrative centre) by road. Ustyugovka is the nearest rural locality.
