= Mikhaylovka, Diyashevsky Selsoviet, Bakalinsky District, Republic of Bashkortostan =

Mikhaylovka Михайловка
- Selo
- Location within Bashkortostan Location within Russia
- Coordinates: 55°07′N 53°38′E
- Country: Russia
- Region: Bashkortostan
- District: Bakalinsky District
- Time zone: UTC+5:00

Mikhaylovka (Russian: Михайловка) is a rural locality (a selo) in Diyashevsky Selsoviet, Bakalinsky District, Bashkortostan, Russia. The population was 162 as of 2010.

== Geography ==
It is located 19 km from Bakaly and 5 km from Diyashevo.
