= Mikhaylovka, Zabaykalsky Krai =

Mikhaylovka Михайловка
- Selo
- Location within Zabaykalsky Krai Location within Russia
- Coordinates: 51°07′N 119°25′E
- Country: Russia
- Region: Zabaykalsky Krai
- District: Nerchinsko-Zavodsky District
- Time zone: UTC+9:00

Mikhaylovka (Russian: Михайловка) is a rural locality (a selo) in Nerchinsko-Zavodsky District, Zabaykalsky Krai, Russia. Population: 559 (2021 census); 717 (2010 census); 771 (2002 census); There are 9 streets in this selo.

== Geography ==
This rural locality is located 25 km from Nerchinsky Zavod (the district's administrative centre), 426 km from Chita (capital of Zabaykalsky Krai) and 5,734 km from Moscow. Mikhaylovsky Uchastok is the nearest rural locality.
