= Mikhaylovka, Vladimir Oblast =

Mikhaylovka Михайловка
- Village
- Location within Vladimir Oblast Location within Russia
- Coordinates: 55°48′N 42°17′E
- Country: Russia
- Region: Vladimir Oblast
- District: Muromsky District
- Time zone: UTC+3:00

Mikhaylovka (Russian: Миха́йловка) is a rural locality (a village) in Borisoglebskoye Rural Settlement, Muromsky District, Vladimir Oblast, Russia. The population was 11 as of 2010.

== Geography ==
Mikhaylovka is located 50 km northeast of Murom (the district's administrative centre) by road. Sosnitsy is the nearest rural locality.
