= Mikhaylovka, Fyodorovsky District, Republic of Bashkortostan =

Mikhaylovka Михайловка
- Selo
- Location within Bashkortostan Location within Russia
- Coordinates: 52°55′N 55°17′E
- Country: Russia
- Region: Bashkortostan
- District: Fyodorovsky District
- Time zone: UTC+5:00

Mikhaylovka (Russian: Михайловка) is a rural locality (a selo) and the administrative centre of Mikhaylovsky Selsoviet, Fyodorovsky District, Bashkortostan, Russia. The population was 305 as of 2010. There are 2 streets.

== Geography ==
Mikhaylovka is located 40 km south of Fyodorovka (the district's administrative centre) by road. Batyrovo is the nearest rural locality.
