= Mikhaylovka, Yanurusovsky Selsoviet, Ishimbaysky District, Republic of Bashkortostan =

Mikhaylovka Михайловка
- Village
- Location within Bashkortostan Location within Russia
- Coordinates: 53°38′N 56°20′E
- Country: Russia
- Region: Bashkortostan
- District: Ishimbaysky District
- Time zone: UTC+5:00

Mikhaylovka (Russian: Михайловка) is a rural locality (a village) in Yanurusovsky Selsoviet, Ishimbaysky District, Bashkortostan, Russia. The population was 26 as of 2010.

== Geography ==
It is located 42 km from Ishimbay and 4 km from Yanurusovo.
