= Mikhaylovka, Khaybullinsky District, Republic of Bashkortostan =

Mikhaylovka Михайловка
- Selo
- Location within Bashkortostan Location within Russia
- Coordinates: 52°02′N 57°51′E
- Country: Russia
- Region: Bashkortostan
- District: Khaybullinsky District
- Time zone: UTC+5:00

Mikhaylovka (Russian: Михайловка) is a rural locality (a selo) in Ivanovsky Selsoviet, Khaybullinsky District, Bashkortostan, Russia. The population was 148 as of 2010. There are 3 streets.

== Geography ==
Mikhaylovka is located 42 km northwest of Akyar (the district's administrative centre) by road. Ivanovka is the nearest rural locality.
