= Mikhaylovka, Blagoveshchensky District, Republic of Bashkortostan =

Mikhaylovka Михайловка
- Village
- Location within Bashkortostan Location within Russia
- Coordinates: 55°20′N 56°22′E
- Country: Russia
- Region: Bashkortostan
- District: Blagoveshchensky District
- Time zone: UTC+5:00

Mikhaylovka (Russian: Михайловка) is a rural locality (a village) in Novonadezhdinsky Selsoviet, Blagoveshchensky District, Bashkortostan, Russia. The population was 10 as of 2010. There is 1 street.

== Geography ==
Mikhaylovka is located 49 km northeast of Blagoveshchensk (the district's administrative centre) by road.
