= Mikhaylovka, Mikhaylovsky District, Primorsky Krai =

Rural locality in Primorsky Krai, Russia

Coordinates: 43°55′42″N 132°00′22″E

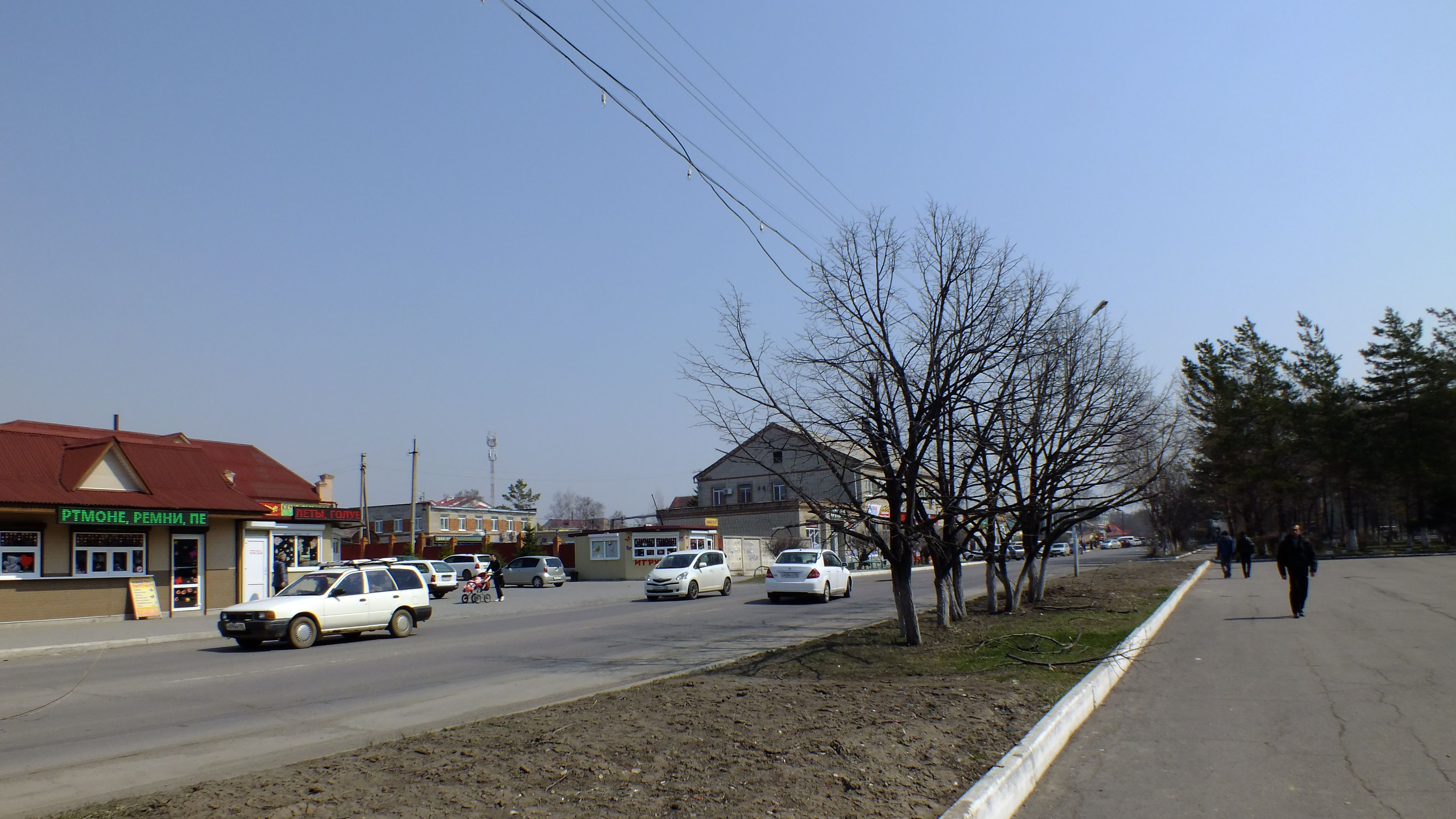
Street of Mikhailovka

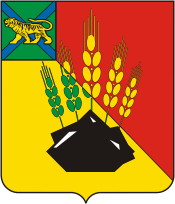
Coat of arms of Mikhaylovka

Mikhaylovka (Russian: Михайловка) is a rural locality (a selo) and the administrative center of Mikhaylovsky District, Primorsky Krai, Russia. Population: 9,153 (2010 census); 9,319 (2002 census); 10,290 (1989 Soviet census).

The town has a small settlement of Koryo-saram: ethnic Koreans of the former Soviet Union. The Korean ancestors of the Koryo-saram lived in the area in the early 1900s, but were forced to go to Central Asia during a forced migration in 1937. Their descendants subsequently returned to this village when movement restrictions were eased. As of 2019, there were around 30 households in the area, with a Korean-language school. The Korean residents are mainly farmers. However, the population is significantly aging.
