= Asinovsky District =

Asinovsky District Асиновский район (Russian)
- District
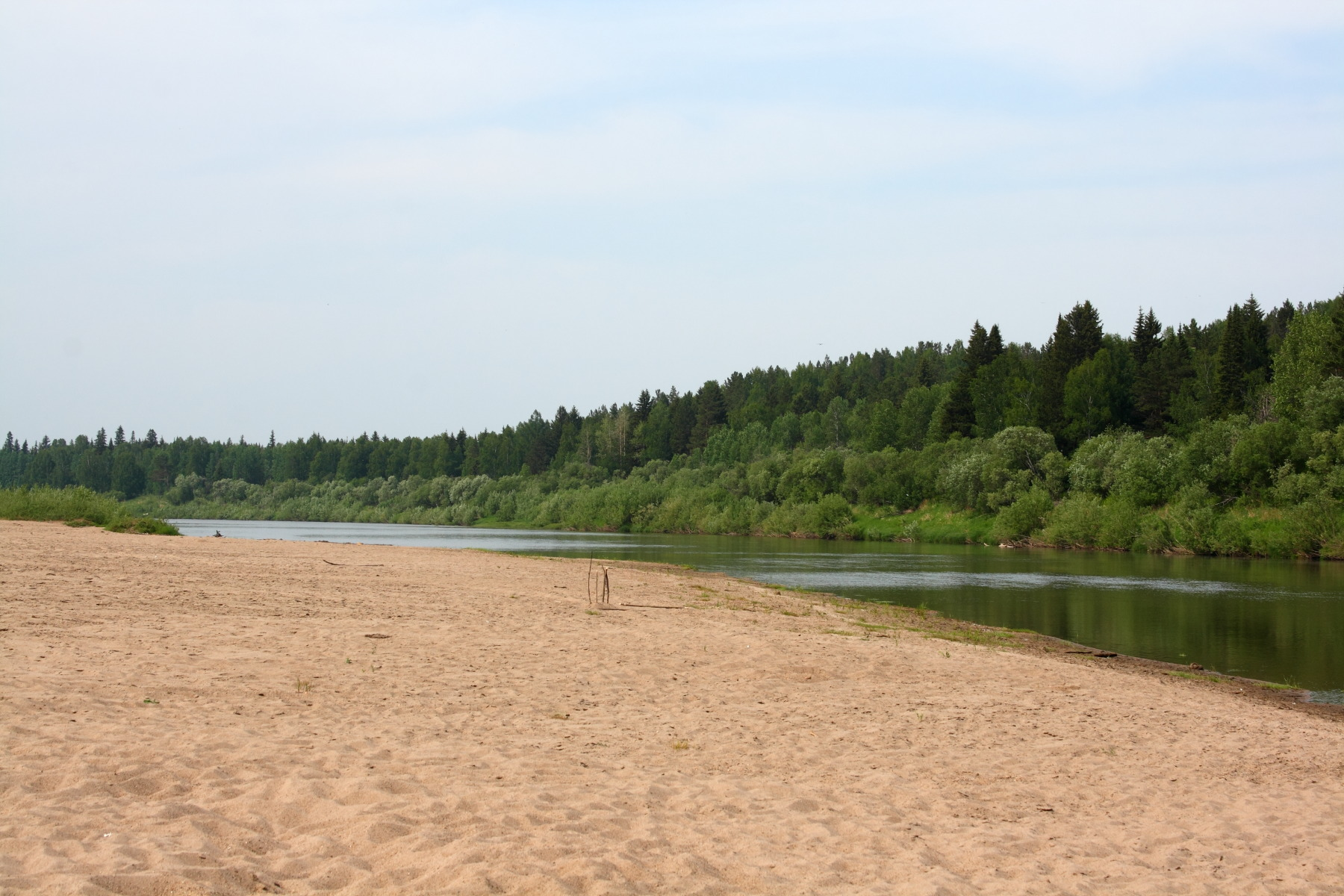
- Yaya River, Asinovsky District

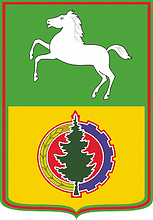
- Coat of arms
- Location of Asinovsky District in Tomsk Oblast
- Coordinates: 57°00′N 86°09′E
- Country: Russia
- Federal subject: Tomsk Oblast
- Administrative center: Asino

Area
  - Total: 5,943.3 km^{2} (2,294.7 sq mi)

Population (2010 Census)
  - Total: 36,459
  - Density: 6.1345/km^{2} (15.888/sq mi)
  - Urban: 70.3%
  - Rural: 29.7%

Administrative structure
  - Inhabited localities: 1 cities/towns, 39 rural localities

Municipal structure
  - Municipally incorporated as: Asinovsky Municipal District
  - Municipal divisions: 1 urban settlements, 6 rural settlements
- Time zone: UTC+7 (MSK+4)
- OKTMO ID: 69608000
- Website: http://asino.ru/

Asinovsky District (Russian: А́синовский райо́н) is an administrative and municipal district (raion), one of the sixteen in Tomsk Oblast, Russia. It is located in the southeast of the oblast. The area of the district is 5,943.3 square kilometers (2,294.7 sq mi). Its administrative center is the town of Asino. Population: 36,459 (2010 Census); 12,911 (2002 census); 16,222 (1989 Soviet census). The population of Asino accounts for 70.3% of the district's total population.
