= Mesyagutovo, Duvansky District, Bashkortostan =

Mesyagutovo Месягутово
- Selo

Other transcription(s)
  - Bashkir: Мәсәғүт
- Interactive map of Mesyagutovo
- Location of Mesyagutovo Mesyagutovo (Bashkortostan)
- Coordinates: 55°31′N 58°16′E
- Country: Russia
- Federal subject: Bashkortostan
- Administrative district: Duvansky District
- SelsovietSelsoviet: Mesyagutovsky

Population (2010 Census)
  - Total: 10,883
  - Estimate (2014): 12,041 (+10.6%)

Administrative status
  - Capital of: Duvansky District, Mesyagutovsky Selsoviet

Municipal status
  - Municipal district: Duvansky Municipal District
  - Rural settlement: Mesyagutovsky Selsoviet Rural Settlement
  - Capital of: Duvansky Municipal District, Mesyagutovsky Selsoviet Rural Settlement
- Time zone: UTC+5 (MSK+2)
- Postal code: 452530
- OKTMO ID: 80623422101

Mesyagutovo (Russian: Месягутово, Bashkir: Мәсәғүт, Məsəğut) is a rural locality (a selo) and the administrative center of Duvansky District of the Republic of Bashkortostan, Russia, located on the Ay River. Population: 10,883 (2010 census); 9,761 (2002 census); 8,266 (1989 Soviet census).
