= Duvansky District =

Duvansky District Дуванский район (Russian)
- District

Other transcription(s)
  - Bashkir: Дыуан районы
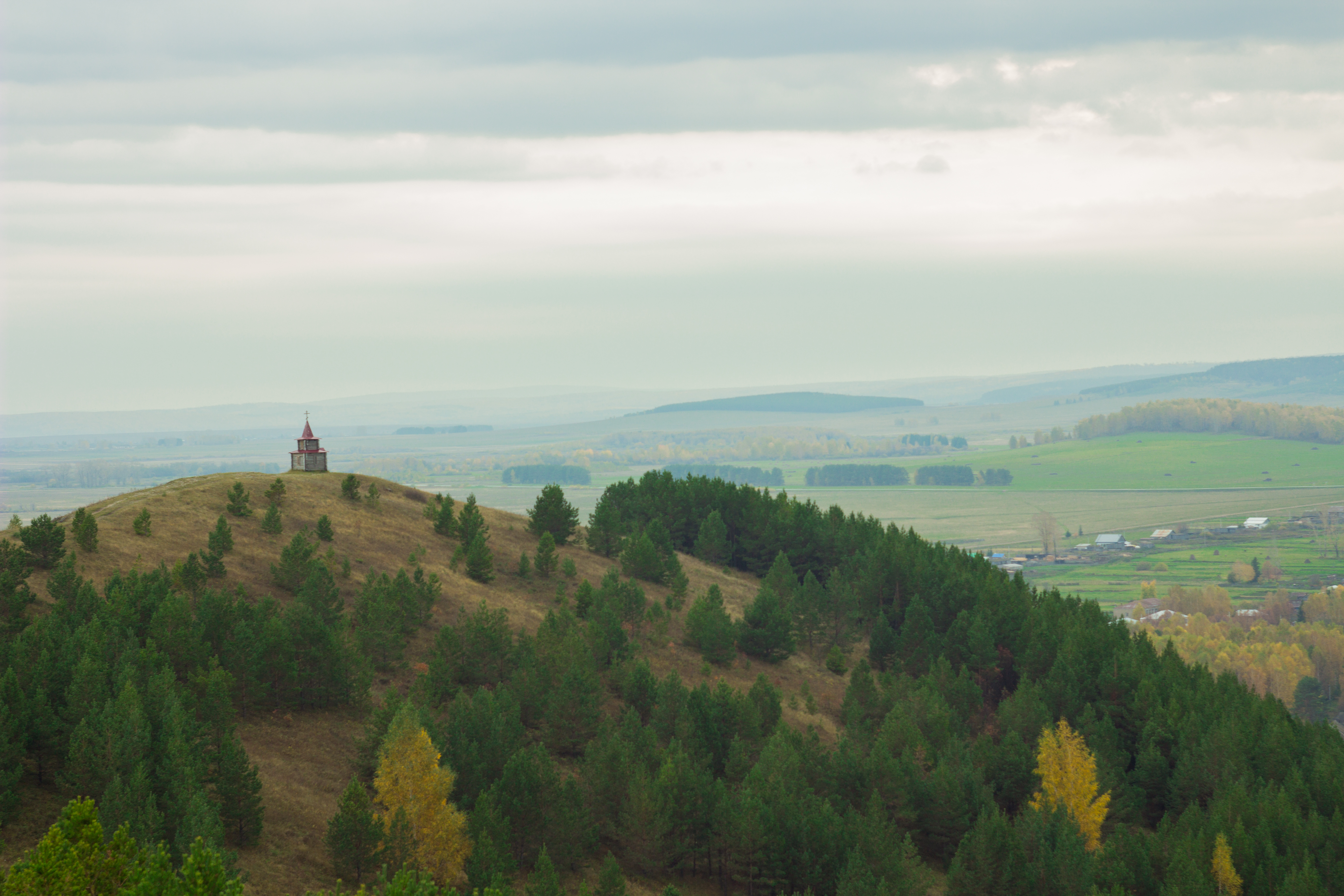
- Mount Big Tastuba, Duvansky District

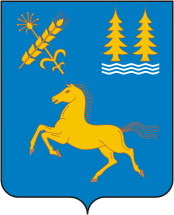
- Flag Coat of arms
- Location of Duvansky District in the Republic of Bashkortostan
- Coordinates: 55°32′N 58°15′E
- Country: Russia
- Federal subject: Republic of Bashkortostan
- Established: 1930
- Administrative center: Mesyagutovo

Area
  - Total: 3,243 km^{2} (1,252 sq mi)

Population (2010 Census)
  - Total: 31,068
  - Density: 9.580/km^{2} (24.81/sq mi)
  - Urban: 0%
  - Rural: 100%

Administrative structure
  - Administrative divisions: 13 Selsoviets
  - Inhabited localities: 47 rural localities

Municipal structure
  - Municipally incorporated as: Duvansky Municipal District
  - Municipal divisions: 0 urban settlements, 13 rural settlements
- Time zone: UTC+5 (MSK+2)
- OKTMO ID: 80623000
- Website: http://www.duvanrb.ru

Population of Duvansky District
- 2010 Census: 31,068
- 2002 Census: 32,016
- 1989 Census: 29,636
- 1979 Census: 30,495

Duvansky District (Russian: Дува́нский райо́н; Bashkir: Дыуан районы, Dıwan rayonı) is an administrative and municipal district (raion), one of the fifty-four in the Republic of Bashkortostan, Russia. It is located in the north of the republic and borders with Perm Krai in the north, Mechetlinsky District in the northeast and east, Kiginsky District in the southeast, Salavatsky District in the south, Nurimanovsky District in the southwest, Karaidelsky District in the west, and with Askinsky District in the northwest. The area of the district is 3,243 square kilometers (1,252 sq mi). Its administrative center is the rural locality (a selo) of Mesyagutovo. As of the 2010 Census, the total population of the district was 31,068, with the population of Mesyagutovo accounting for 35.0% of that number.

== History ==
The district was established in 1930.

== Administrative and municipal status ==
Within the framework of administrative divisions, Duvansky District is one of the fifty-four in the Republic of Bashkortostan. The district is divided into thirteen selsoviets, comprising forty-seven rural localities. As a municipal division, the district is incorporated as Duvansky Municipal District. Its thirteen selsoviets are incorporated as thirteen rural settlements within the municipal district. The selo of Mesyagutovo serves as the administrative center of both the administrative and municipal district.
