= List of rural localities in Tomsk Oblast =

Map of Russia with Tomsk Oblast highlighted

This is a list of rural localities in Tomsk Oblast. Tomsk Oblast (Russian: То́мская о́бласть, Tomskaya oblast) is a federal subject of Russia (an oblast). It lies in the southeastern West Siberian Plain, in the southwest of the Siberian Federal District. Its administrative center is the city of Tomsk. According to the 2010 Russian Census, the population is 1,047,394.

== Locations ==
- 5 kilometr
- 86th Kvartal
- Alexandrovskoye
- Bakchar
- Belostok
- Kargasok
- Komsomolsk
- Kozhevnikovo
- Krivosheino
- Maykovo, Tomsk Oblast
- Melnikovo
- Molchanovo
- Narym
- Novy Tevriz
- Novy Vasyugan
- Parabel
- Pervomayskoye
- Podgornoye
- Samus
- Sredny Vasyugan
- Teguldet
- Ust-Chizhapka
- Zyryanskoye

== See also ==
- Lists of rural localities in Russia
