= Krivosheinsky =

Krivosheinsky (masculine), Krivosheinskaya (feminine), or Krivosheinskoye (neuter) may refer to:

- Krivosheinsky District, a district of Tomsk Oblast, Russia
- Krivosheinskaya, a rural locality (a village) in Vologda Oblast, Russia

== See also ==
- Krivosheino
