= Iksa (river) =

River in Tomsk Oblast, Russia

Iksa Икса
- Mouth location in Tomsk Oblast, Russia

Location
- Country: Russia

Physical characteristics
- Source
  - location: Vasyugan Plain
  - coordinates: 56°19′59″N 82°09′38″E
- Mouth: Chaya
  - location: Podgornoye
  - coordinates: 57°46′25″N 82°37′45″E
- Length: 430 km (270 mi)
- Basin size: 6,130 km^{2} (2,370 sq mi)
- Discharge
  - average: 15.05 m^{3}/s (531 cu ft/s) (68 km (42 mi) from the mouth)

Basin features
- Progression: Chaya → Ob→ Kara Sea

The Iksa (Russian: Икса) is a river in Novosibirsk Oblast and Tomsk Oblast, Russia. It is the longest tributary of the Chaya, with a length of 430 kilometres (270 mi) and a drainage basin area of 6,130 square kilometres (2,370 mi^{2}).

The basin of the river is located in the Chainsky, Bakcharsky and Kolyvansky districts. There are a number of rural settlements near its banks, such as Plotnikovo, Borodinsk, Kopanoye Ozero, Vostochnoye and Ermilovka. A stretch of its lower course is navigable.

== Course ==
The Iksa has its sources in the Vasyugan Plain, part of the West Siberian Plain. It flows in an eastern direction in its upper reaches and then in a roughly northern direction all along its middle and lower course. Finally it meets the right bank of the Chaya near Podgornoye, 140 km (87 mi) from its mouth in the Ob.

=== Tributaries ===
The main tributaries of the Iksa are the 25 km (16 mi) long Elanka (Еланка) and the 38 km (24 mi) long Antik (Антик) on the right, as well as the 26 km (16 mi) long Rybnaya (Рыбная) on the left. There are numerous small lakes and swamps in its basin, especially to the west of its middle course. The river is fed by snow and rain. It is frozen between October and April.

== See also ==
- List of rivers of Russia
