= Parabel =

Parabel may refer to:

- Parabel (river), a river in Tomsk Oblast, Russia
- Parabel (rural locality), a rural locality (a selo) in Parabelsky District of Tomsk Oblast, Russia
