= Parbig =

River in Tomsk Oblast, Russia

Parbig Парбиг
- Mouth location in Tomsk Oblast, Russia

Location
- Country: Russia

Physical characteristics
- Source: Vasyugan Swamp
- Mouth
  - coordinates: 57°36′45″N 82°17′35″E
- Length: 320 km (200 mi)
- Basin size: 9,180 km^{2} (3,540 sq mi)

Basin features
- Progression: Chaya → Ob→ Kara Sea

Parbig (Russian: Парбиг) is a river in Tomsk Oblast, Russia. It gives origin to the Chaya river.

== Course ==
It has its sources in the Vasyugan Swamp. It flows roughly in a northeastern direction across Bakcharsky district into Chainsky district, where it meets the Bakchar; the two flow into one another and become the Chaya, a tributary of the Ob.

=== Tributaries ===
Its main tributary is the 232 km (144 mi) long Andarma on the right. Listed by distance from the river's mouth, other tributaries are:

- 18 km (11 mi): Upper Nyursa
- 34 km (21 mi): Bundyur
- 64 km (40 mi): Vshivka
- 68 km (42 mi): Andarma
- 97 km (60 mi): Kedrovka (lower tributary)
- 105 km (65 mi): Nilga
- 116 km (72 mi): Nizhnyaya Mokhovaya
- 138 km (86 mi): Penzyachka
- 143 km (89 mi): Spirtovka
- 152 km (94 mi): Verkhnyaya Mokhovaya
- 180 km (110 mi): Kedrovka (upper tributary)
- 184 km (114 mi): Dvoychaga
- 210 km (130 mi): (unnamed river)
- 212 km (132 mi): Silenskaya
- 218 km (135 mi): Chaga
- 231 km (144 mi): Burka
- 251 km (156 mi): (unnamed river)
- 252 km (157 mi): Gar
- 278 km (173 mi): Smorodinka
- 279 km (173 mi): Kudreyka
