= Otyken =

Russian Siberian indigenous music band

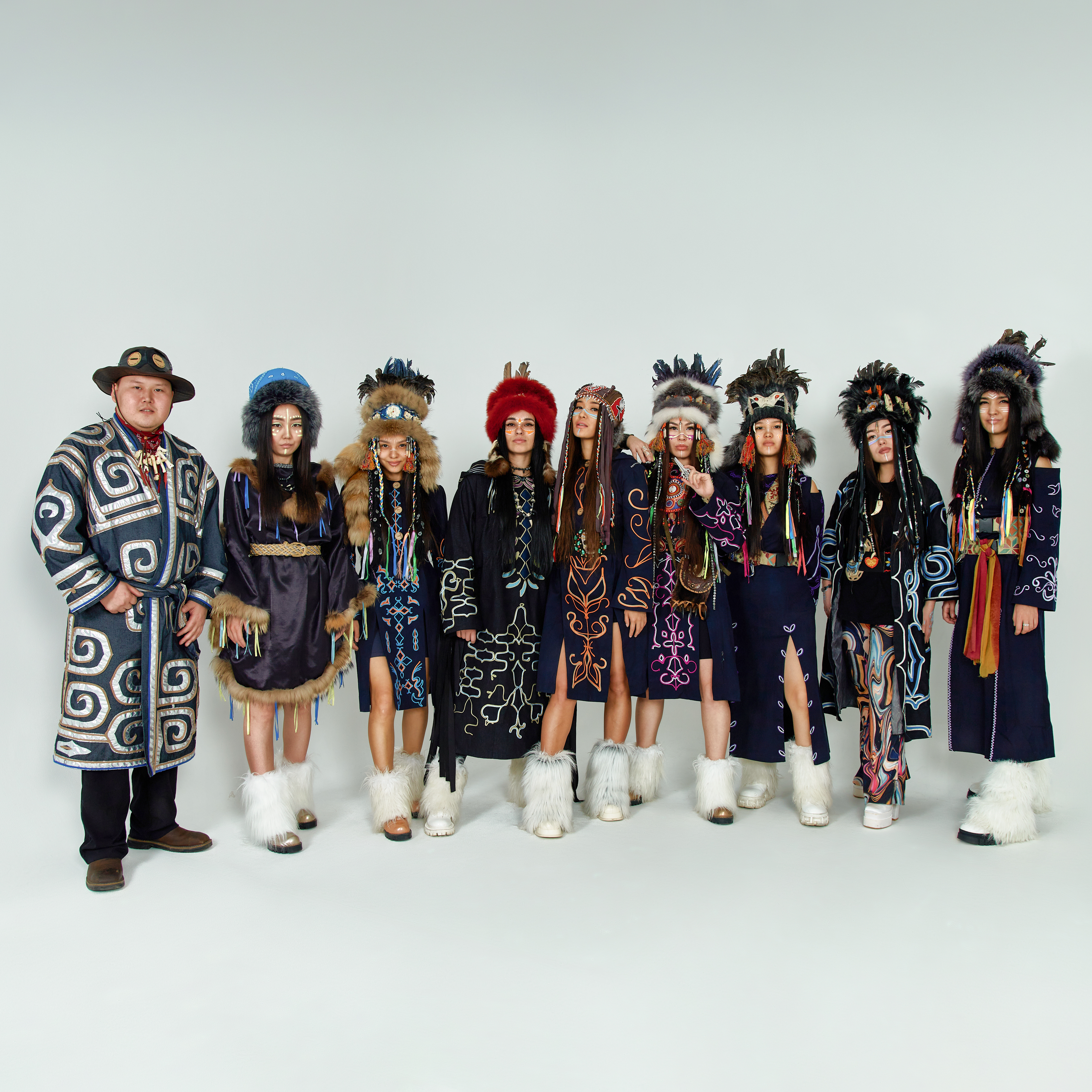
- Otyken: Ach, Snezhana, Otamay, Maya, Azyan, Tsveta, Kunchari, Hakaida, Muna

Background information
- Origin: Krasnoyarsk Krai, Russia
- Genres: Folk music, Folk-pop
- Years active: 2015–present
- Label: Aboriginal Records
- Members: Tsveta, Azyan, Ach, Hakaida, Muna, Hara, Kys, Achanay, Sandro
- Website: Official website

Otyken (Russian: Отукен, romanized: Otuken, OH-too-kyen) is a Russian Siberian indigenous music group that mixes elements of local folk music with modern pop, incorporating traditional instruments, lyrics, and languages. Group members claim that 'Otyken' is a Chulym language term for a sacred place where warriors would lay down their arms and talk. The band was formed in 2015 by Andrey 'Medonos' Chernetsov, and their debut album was released in 2018. As of June 2025, the group had over 2.9 million followers on TikTok, over 250,000 monthly listeners on Spotify, and over 1 million subscribers on YouTube with over 250 million views. The band members are of Siberian ethnicities from settlements along the Chulym river in the taiga of Krasnoyarsk Krai.

== Genre and style ==
The group's career began by performing traditional songs representative of their indigenous cultures; later, modern elements of rock and pop were blended over this folk foundation to create greater appeal for global audiences. Their eye-catching homemade costumes, which are designed by Medonos, incorporate historic and modern design elements as well as 'fantasy' for this same reason. Otyken's music is recorded with traditional instruments such as the komuz, igil, jaw harp, rattle, tambourine, and leather drum; it incorporates modern instruments such as the keyboard, bass guitar, programmed electronic drums. A saxophone appeared in some older tracks, such as My Wing but is no longer utilised. Throat singing is also frequently used. Many of the group's sounds, both instrumental and vocal, attempt to mimic the sounds of nature and animals, while the lyrics try to capture the practices, beliefs, and spirit of the indigenous people. The language is mostly in Chulym Tatar, which had only 44 speakers in 2010 and about 30 speakers in 2020; some songs are also sung in Khakas or Russian. The group performs to a pre-recorded backing track with many elements, typically the drum beat, synths, horn and the aforementioned saxophone. The lead and backing vocals are performed live, along with bass guitar, and some percussion elements.

== History ==
=== Formation ===
Otyken was formed by its producer, manager, and songwriter, Andrey 'Medonos' Chernetsov, initially in order to preserve Chulym folklore, traditions, and songs which are nearing extinction. It subsequently morphed into an 'ethno-fusion show'. Though not of Siberian ethnicity, Medonos (which is a nickname that translates to 'honey bearer' in Russian), grew up at his family's apiary in the Siberian wilderness among its indigenous people, who maintained a longstanding beekeeping partnership with the Chernetsov lineage. There he entered into the beekeeping trade, but also engaged in Chulym culture: hunting, fishing, and foraging with the people and marrying an indigenous woman. He founded The Ethnographic Museum of Honey in Krasnoyarsk city and became its director to preserve the cultures of the Chulym, Tatarlar, Ket, Khakass, and Selkup indigenous peoples, while also hosting lectures and gatherings. The museum attracted visitors (Native Americans in particular) who also wanted to hear the traditional instruments and songs played by indigenous people. This inspired Medonos to find locals who would demonstrate their ethnic music at museum concerts. Medonos' wife was among the first performers and later went on to create their costumes. According to Medonos, the girls were selected to be "beautiful, tall, with thick, black hair. Skin brown, swarthy, smooth. And musical abilities, too."

=== Development ===
In 2013, Medonos started a YouTube channel to share Chulym culture. There he showcased an apiary made with traditional log beehives and Chulym folklore, dances, and songs that had historically accompanied honey production. In 2015, Otyken was formed and was partnered with Medonos in the production of wild Chulym honey. Their honey products became popular in Japan and the sales helped to establish the band through funding music production, instruments, equipment, and costumes.

At some point, the genre of the band became that of an 'Ethnic Fusion Show', with a somewhat altered mission statement:

"The OTYKEN group is an artistic collective image of the indigenous peoples of Siberia and does not literally represent any cultural, creative or linguistic heritage. The main mission of the group members is to attract the attention of the world community to the study of the history and traditions of multinational Russia. The ethnic composition of the OTYKEN group from Krasnoyarsk Krai periodically changes to give different talents the opportunity to express themselves. The current members of the "Siberian Aborigines" are Khakass, Dolgans, Tuvinians and Chulyms.

=== Activity ===
Otyken released their first album in 2018. A yurt was built at the apiary in the following year to host rehearsals and meetings, and they began holding concerts regularly at the museum.

Otyken performed in numerous international events such as Universiade and the Freestyle Wrestling World Championship. In 2022, they performed "Genesis" on the Recording Academy's Global Spin series.

Their second album Kykakacha, released in 2021, contained more pop and EDM elements, as well as tracks remade with a new lead singer, Azyan.

The group has faced some setbacks due to International sanctions during the Russian invasion of Ukraine. In 2022, their PayPal account was blocked and their international sales were limited. Furthermore, Otyken was invited to perform in the FIFA World Cup Qatar 2022 opening ceremony, however they were rejected last minute in October after the European Sports Committee banned Russians from participating.

The group made plans to perform in the USA in 2023, including on America's Got Talent, but they were denied the entry to the United States.

== Members ==
The membership of Otyken has changed over time, resulting in different ethnicities being represented. In an article from June 13, 2022, the members of Otyken were stated to have been of members of the Chulym-Khakas indigenous group. In an article from September 20, 2022, the members were stated to have been representatives of the Chulym, Ket and Selkup groups. In an article from November 11, 2022, producer Andrey Medonos stated that "Me, as the producer and songwriter I can say about myself that I’m Russian, but the nationality of other members is private matter." The current line up is stated to include "Khakass, Dolgans, Tuvinians and Chulyms".

All of the members are local talent from tiny settlements near Pasechnoye village, where medicine and electricity are difficult to access and food is obtained locally through fishing, hunting, foraging, farming, and beekeeping. As a result, the group's members maintain busy lives outside of the band, working in their communities and assisting their families – especially in summer, when concerts come to a halt. Although there are around ten main members in the group, fewer people used to participate in concerts, depending on each person's availability. In 2025, all members were present at all shows. Few of the performers were professionally trained in music (with the exception of Ach), but many indigenous Siberians have musical abilities as it is customary for them to play folk songs and instruments in the home. They go by stage names and are not allowed to have social media accounts, according to an interview with past members. The claim that they all live in small villages is disputed by a former member as a 'myth'.

=== Active membership ===
- Tsveta – jaw harp, drums, komuz, vocals, rattles (2017–present)
- Azyan – vocals (2018, 2021–present)
- Sandro – rattles, throat singing, dancer (2020–present)
- Ach – keyboard, throat singing (2020–present)
- Hakaida – drums (2022–present)
- Muna (replacing Aiko) — bass guitar (2023–present)
- Hara (replacing Maya) - drums (2024–present)
- Kys (replacing Kunchari) — igil (2024–present)
- Achanay (replacing Otamay) — vocals, komuz (2024–present)

=== Past members ===
- Alyona – vocals, drums (2015–2018)
- Kristina – violin (2015–2019)
- Misha – throat singing, guitar, bass guitar, jaw harp, drums, komuz (2017–2019)
- Aisylu (born Ksenia Kruchinina) — bass guitar, drums, jaw harp, vocals, maracas (2017–2021); later founded the ethno group AINA (2022–present)
- Aiko – bass guitar (2018, 2023)
- Altynai (Aleksandra) – komuz, vocals, jaw harp (2018–2021)
- Eugene (Yevgeny) – saxophone, throat singing, jaw harp (2018–2021)
- Taida (Margarita) – vocals (2019–2021)
- Maya (Viktoria) – drums, assistant producer (2019–2024)
- Otamay (Kristina) - komuz (2022–2024)
- Kunchari (Liana) – igil (2021–2024)

== Discography ==
=== Albums ===
- Otyken (2018)
- Lord of Honey (2019)
- Kykakacha (2021)
- Phenomenon (2023)

=== Singles ===
- Steps ( formerly Шаги Шойгу, Steps of Shoigu) (2021)
- Altay (2023), with Ummet Ozcan, Oz Records

=== Other ===
- Belief Remix (2024), Xzibit remixed Otyken original track «Belief» into the hip-hop genre, adding some verses in English.
- Oneness (2024), teaming with The Ethereal Daydreamer, Otyken recorded a soundtrack and a video that feature a teaser for the forthcoming Japanese film Senseki
