= Belostok, Tomsk Oblast =

Belostok Белосток
- Village
- Interactive map of Belostok
- Coordinates: 57.175°N 83.655°E
- Country: Russia
- Oblast: Tomsk
- District: Krivosheino
- Rural settlement: Pudovka

Belostok (Russian: Белосток, Polish: Białystok) is a small village in Russia located northwest of Tomsk, Russia. It was founded, at the turn of the 20th century, by Polish settlers from the Podlaskie / Białystok region and named after the city of origin. Today, Belostok has several dozen wooden and brick houses, a few shops, and a community centre. A Roman Catholic church built in the early 20th century burned in 2017.

== History ==
The Polish settlers came to Siberia as part of the colonization efforts of the Stolypin reform. In the beginning Polish settlers were doing fairly well and the village developed quickly, but the situation changed after the October Revolution. At the time of the Soviet Union the residents of Belostok resisted compulsory collectivisation for a long time, refused to join the kolkhoz, fought for the right to keep their identity and religion.

Between 1936 and 1938, Poles were affected by mass repressions on the part of the NKVD: attempts were made to ban the use of the Polish language at school, orders undermining everyday life were sent, severe punishments were imposed, and matters of faith and tradition were interfered into. Finally, the residents of Bilostok gave in, and the village was collectivized. Soon afterwards the Polish operation of the NKVD arrested more than one hundred men from Belostok. The accused were subjected to sham trials, sentenced to death and murdered in the nearby Krivosheino. Afterward their bodies were thrown into the Ob River without informing their families about their fate of their grandparents, parents, and sons killed.

The truth about the NKVD crime was published only in 1993 by Wasyl Haniewicz, the researcher of the history of Poles in the Tomsk Oblast, who published the book Białostocka tragedia [The Belostok Tragedy] based on archival documents and eyewitness accounts. The book contains Martyrology section, which includes about 100 people (the list of residents of the village of Bialystok, repressed in 1930.).

At present, Belostok is inhabited chiefly by Russians, and people with Polish roots account for only 25 percent of its residents. The descendants of Polish settlers seldom use the language of their grandparents. The Polish language can still be heard in prayers which have survived in the memory of subsequent generations.

The wooden church building, seized by the authorities in the Stalinist period and falling into ruin, was returned to the Poles in 1990. After the reconstruction it reconsecrated in 1998. The church was burned in April 2017. In June 2017 fundraising was launched for its reconstruction. The works were planned to be completed by the end of 2019.

== Bibliography ==
- (in Polish) "Wasyli Haniewicz, Tragedia syberyjskiego Białegostoku, Pelplin, 2008, s. 229", a book review by Adam Dobroński
- Wasyl Haniewicz, Siberian Tragedy of Bialystok (Polish: Tragedia syberyjskiego Białegostoku), Pelpin, 2008, 229 pages
- (in Russian) Nikita Petrov and A. B. Roginsky, Polish operation of NKVD
- Adam Dobroński, Białystok na Syberii, MEDYK BIAŁOSTOCKI, NR 103, Listopad 2011
