= Narym =

Narym Нарым
- (a selo)
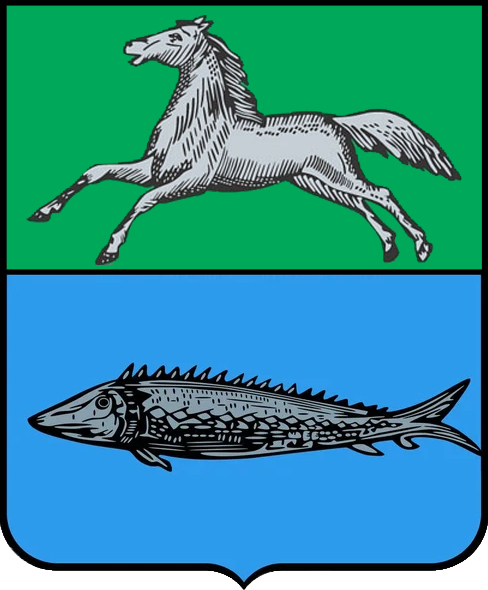
- Coat of arms
- Interactive map of Narym
- Location of Narym Narym (Tomsk Oblast)
- Coordinates: 58°55′40″N 81°35′45″E
- Country: Russia
- Federal subject: Tomsk Oblast
- Founded: 1596
- Elevation: 57 m (187 ft)

Population
  - Estimate (2021): 817 )
- Time zone: UTC+7 (MSK+4)
- Postal code: 636611
- Dialing code: +7 +7 33244
- OKTMO ID: 69644430101

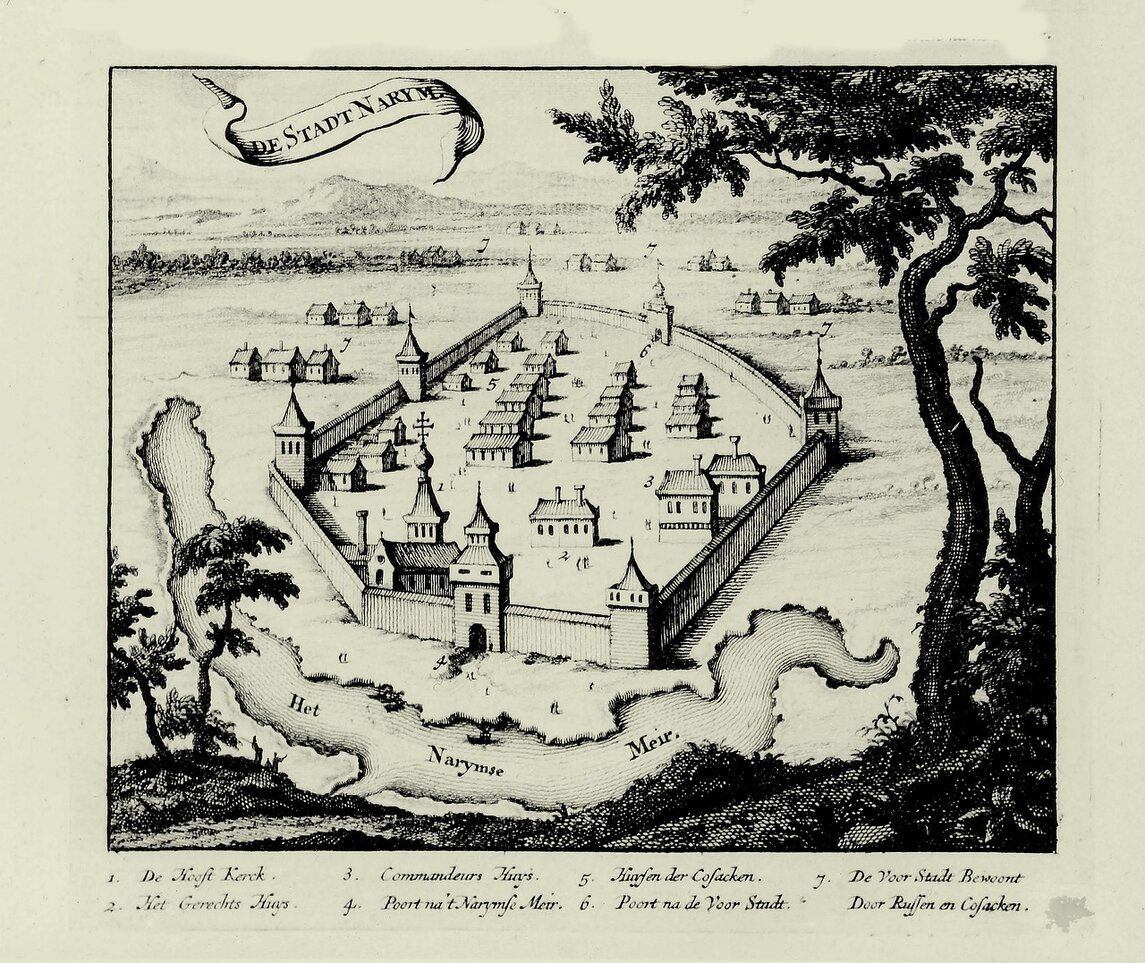
Narym stronghold at the end of the 17th century

Narym (Russian: Нарым, from Southern Selkup няр (nyar) meaning swamp) is a village (selo) in Parabelsky District of Tomsk Oblast, Russia, located on the banks of the Ob River near its confluence with the Ket River, 25 kilometers (16 mi) from the village of Parabel. The village is surrounded on all sides by marshes.

== History ==
Narym was founded in 1596 (or possibly 1598) as Narymsky ostrog—the first Russian settlement on the territory of the current Tomsk Oblast. Russian pioneers would travel up the Ob to Narym, then up the Ket River and over a short portage to the Yenisei River. The village was founded under the supervision of ataman Tugarin of Surgut, who also founded Ketsky Ostrog. In 1601, Narym received town status, but remained a small fort with only temporary inhabitants until 1629. Also in 1601, Narymsky District was formed.

The settlement served as a center for the collection of tribute from the indigenous Selkup. Twice (in 1619 and 1632) the settlement was relocated due to floods and fires. The final location proved no safer from disaster and indeed much of the settlement was burnt down in a fire in 1638, including two ramparts of the wooden ostrog. In 1629, Narym was brought under the jurisdiction of Tomsk and from that time took on greater permanence. In 1633, it had 46 permanent residents, 55 in 1643, and 74 in 1662.

From its beginning, Narym had been a destination for exiles, banished by the Russian government, starting with two farmers of prince Dimitri Pozyarsky in 1626. Many more would follow them.

At the end 18th century, Narym had the status of an uyezd within Tobolsk Viceroyalty (namestnichestvo). In 1785, when the town received its coat of arms, there were already 827 people living in the town, which now had a kremlin with four towers. The settlement became a center for trade between, among other places, Moscow, the Makaryev Fair, and the Irbit fair. Each year there was an annual fair from June 25 to July 25 and a weekly market on Saturdays. In 1822, it lost its position as the regional administrative center to the government of Tomsk.

Narym's market continued to grow during the 19th century, but the population remained at around 1,000. As a transportation and distribution center for the neighboring sparsely populated region, it continued play a meaningful role. In 1925, however, Narym lost its town status and became a selo.

=== Exiles ===
From 1638, Narym became a major destination for Russian exiles, playing host to a large number of Decembrists, Polish insurrectionists, narodniki, and other revolutionaries. Indeed, only the Arkhangelsk and Vyatka regions received more exiles. Because the city lies in a vast swamp, home to many summer mosquitoes, and because winter temperatures can drop to −65 °C (−85 °F), the folk-saying arose, "God made the Crimea; the Devil—Narym"

The Polish revolutionary Bolesław Szostakowicz, who was exiled to Narym in 1866 and stayed in Siberia after his term of exile ended, was grandfather of the composer Dmitri Shostakovich.

Some of Narym's most famous exiles include:

- Valerian Kuybyshev
- Aleksey Rykov
- Joseph Stalin
- Yakov Sverdlov
- Mikhail Tomsky

Stalin remained in Narym for only two months of his planned three years, before he escaped in 1912. Once he came to power, he himself ironically sent thousands of prisoners to the Narym gulag. According to the historian Zubareva, between 1935 and 1939 approximately 200,000 people were sent to Narym alone. In the beginning of the 1950s Narym saw a second major influx of Soviet exiles, after the end of World War II. Between 1930 and 1989 more than 500,000 people were banished to Narym and its surroundings. Under Stalin's rule, a portion of these prisoners were placed in labor camps, while the rest were simply executed. The executed were secretly thrown into mass graves by the river to the south of Narym, but because of riverbank erosion, after moving the NKVD building, masses of skeletons surfaced above the ground. The local population, of which many had family members who had been executed, who had resisted themselves against collectivization and faced the ensuing repression, were able to identify approximately 1,000 of the executed by the clothing on their remains. The Soviet authorities transported the rest of the skeletons in boats to the river falls, in order to further conceal the mass execution.

In 1948, a Stalin-museum was built to commemorate his exile there. In 1960, after the de-Stalinization, the name was changed to the Museum of Political Exiles, ironically enough, as the flow of political exiles had not yet stopped.

== Demographics ==
Here are historical populations of Narym. In reality there were frequently fewer people living within the settlement, as many people would leave on trade-related travel.

Year	Population
1633	46
1643	55
1662	74
1785	827
1822	914
1851	916

Year	Population
1864	1441
1867	1673
1879	2284
1897	1129
1904	854
1911	895

== Born in Narym ==
- Vadim Kozhevnikov, Russian writer
