= 5 kilometr =

5 kilometr 5 километр
- Settlement
- Location within Tomsk Oblast Location within Russia
- Coordinates: 59.065278°N 80.805°E
- Country: Russia
- Region: Tomsk Oblast
- District: Kargasoksky District
- Time zone: UTC+07:00

5 kilometr (Russian: 5 километр) is a rural locality (a settlement) in Kargasokskoye Rural Settlement of Kargasoksky District, Russia. The population was 269 as of 2015.

== Geography ==
5 kilometr is located 13 km west of Kargasok (the district's administrative centre) by road. Kargasok is the nearest rural locality.

== Streets ==
- Novaya
- Topolevaya
