= Lower Chulym dialect =

Chulym dialect

Lower Chulym
- West Chulym
- Ӧс (июс) тили
- Native to: Russia
- Region: Siberia
- Ethnicity: Lower Chulyms
- Extinct: 2011
- Language family: Turkic: Common Turkic; Siberian Turkic; South Siberian; Northern Altai group; (Chulym); Lower Chulym
- Dialects: Küärik; Ketsik; Yezhi; Yatsi; Chibi

Language codes
- ISO 639-3: –
- Glottolog: chul1246
- Linguasphere: 44-AAB-dha

Lower Chulym is a Turkic dialect of Chulym formerly spoken by the Chulyms on the lower course of the Chulym river and its tributaries, the Kiya and the Yaya in Russia. It went extinct in 2011. It is sometimes grouped with Northern Altai and the Kondoma dialect of Shor, due to similarities.

== Research ==
When the Russian researcher Dulzon began to study Lower Chulym in the 1940s, the Lower Chulym Turks numbered no more than 250. In the 1990s, their Russification was nearly complete. The language is today, with no doubt, extinct.

== Classification ==
Lower Chulym is classified in the Siberian group of Turkic languages. Russian linguists consider it to be a dialect of Chulym, together with Middle Chulym. However, this question is still open.

It is sometimes classed with Northern Altai and the Kondoma dialect of Shor in a Northern Altai group. This is due to the Lower Chulym reflex of Proto-Turkic -d- as -j-, for example proto-Turkic *adak 'leg' as айақ, ajaq 'leg', versus Middle Chulym азақ, azaq. Tom Tatar and Baraba Tatar dialects of Siberian Tatar also bear resemblance to it.

A third Turkic variety, Küärik, was spoken in the Chulym basin, north of Mariinsk. It is known from the work of Radloff, created around 1900. This dialect, which had disappeared by the time of Dulzon in 1940, was considered by Radloff to be identical to Lower Chulym.

== Phonology ==
Key: K - Küärik, LC - Lower Chulym

		Labial	Alveolar	Palatal	Velar	Uvular	Glottal
Nasal		m	n	nʲ (K)	ŋ		
Stop	voiceless	p	t	tʲ (LC)	k		ʔ
Stop	voiced	b	d		g		
Fricative	voiceless		s	ʃ	x		h
Fricative	voiced	v	z	ʒ	ɣ	(ʁ)	
Affricate	voiceless		t͡s	t͡ʃ			
Affricate	voiced		d͡z (LC)				
Approximant			l	j			
Rhotic			r				

== Vocabulary ==
The words for the numerals 80 and 90 are сексон and тоқсон, in contrast to сегизон/сегизен and тоғузон/тоғузан for the rest of the Northern Altai group, being an isogloss with Khalaj, Middle Chulym, Kipchak (except for Southern Altai), Karluk and Oghuz.

== Sample text ==
kaj-zy giži ämdi-dä ǟnä köm-äďi-lär
what-3SG.POSS person {now-too and} {like this} bury-PRS-PL
Before, our people used to bury the person who died in a carved coffin.

äski-dä pis-tiŋ kiži öl-gän kiži-ni köm-äďigän
old-LOC we-GEN person die-PTCP person-ACC bury-PST
Some people bury in this manner now too.

kajzy giži ǟd-äďi kōgur äläm-din kag-āďi pojag-vala
what-3SG.POSS person make-PRS coffin plank-ABL hit-PRS nail-INS
Some people make a coffin from planks [and] hammer (lit. hit) [its parts together] with nail(s).
