= Sredny Vasyugan =

Rural locality in Tomsk Oblast, Russia

Coordinates: 59°13′25″N 78°14′20″E

Sredny Vasyugan (Russian: Средний Васюган) is a rural locality (a selo) in Kargasoksky District of Tomsk Oblast, Russia, located on the left bank of the Vasyugan River near its confluence with the Varinegan, and 220 kilometers (140 mi) from Kargasok, the administrative center of the district. Population: 1,622 (2012 est.). Postal code: 636733.

== History ==
It was first mentioned around 1700. On Semyon Remezov's map of Siberia (1696-1698) it is designated as Vasyugan Yurts. It was later known as Vasyugan Yurt, Yurt Church, Vasyugan, and finally Sredny Vasyugan.

== Infrastructure ==
There is a wharf and an airport in Sredny Vasyugan. Kargasok–Katylga winter road passes through it.

Facilities include a school, a kindergarten, a cultural center, and a library.

== Climate ==
Climate data for Sredny Vasyugan (extremes 1913–present)
| Month | Jan | Feb | Mar | Apr | May | Jun | Jul | Aug | Sep | Oct | Nov | Dec | Year |
|---|---|---|---|---|---|---|---|---|---|---|---|---|---|
| Record high °C (°F) | 3.3 (37.9) | 7.3 (45.1) | 14.9 (58.8) | 26.4 (79.5) | 35.0 (95.0) | 35.6 (96.1) | 37.0 (98.6) | 34.3 (93.7) | 30.2 (86.4) | 23.4 (74.1) | 8.9 (48.0) | 4.1 (39.4) | 37.0 (98.6) |
| Mean daily maximum °C (°F) | −15.1 (4.8) | −10.6 (12.9) | −0.9 (30.4) | 7.4 (45.3) | 15.6 (60.1) | 22.6 (72.7) | 24.8 (76.6) | 21.0 (69.8) | 13.7 (56.7) | 4.6 (40.3) | −6.9 (19.6) | −13.0 (8.6) | 5.3 (41.5) |
| Daily mean °C (°F) | −19.3 (−2.7) | −15.9 (3.4) | −7.0 (19.4) | 1.1 (34.0) | 8.8 (47.8) | 16.2 (61.2) | 18.4 (65.1) | 14.9 (58.8) | 8.4 (47.1) | 0.9 (33.6) | −10.5 (13.1) | −16.9 (1.6) | −0.1 (31.9) |
| Mean daily minimum °C (°F) | −23.1 (−9.6) | −20.3 (−4.5) | −12.1 (10.2) | −3.9 (25.0) | 3.7 (38.7) | 10.9 (51.6) | 12.9 (55.2) | 10.3 (50.5) | 4.5 (40.1) | −1.9 (28.6) | −13.7 (7.3) | −20.7 (−5.3) | −4.4 (24.0) |
| Record low °C (°F) | −51.5 (−60.7) | −50.0 (−58.0) | −44.2 (−47.6) | −34.1 (−29.4) | −16.4 (2.5) | −3.6 (25.5) | 2.2 (36.0) | −2.8 (27.0) | −11.4 (11.5) | −31.8 (−25.2) | −46.8 (−52.2) | −50.0 (−58.0) | −51.5 (−60.7) |
| Average precipitation mm (inches) | 26.9 (1.06) | 20.6 (0.81) | 25.9 (1.02) | 31.3 (1.23) | 55.4 (2.18) | 63.9 (2.52) | 69.9 (2.75) | 77.1 (3.04) | 59.7 (2.35) | 48.1 (1.89) | 45.1 (1.78) | 35.5 (1.40) | 559.4 (22.03) |
Source: pogoda.ru.net
