= Chulym language =

Northeastern Turkic language

Chulym
- Ось тили, чулым тили, татар тили
- Pronunciation: [øs tilɪ ~ ø:s tilɪ], [tadar tilɪ]
- Native to: Russia
- Region: Tyukhtetsky District, Teguldetsky District, Krasnoyarsk Krai, Tomsk Oblast
- Ethnicity: 382 Chulyms (2021 census)
- Native speakers: 30 (2019–2024); 38 (2020 census) <20 (2017)
- Language family: Turkic: Common Turkic; Siberian Turkic; South Siberian; Chulym
- Dialects: Lower Chulym †; Middle Chulym/Tutal; Upper Chulym/Melet
- Writing system: Cyrillic

Language codes
- ISO 639-3: clw
- Glottolog: chul1246 Lower Chulym mele1253 Melet tuta1234 Tutal
- ELP: Chulym
- Linguasphere: 44-AAB-dh
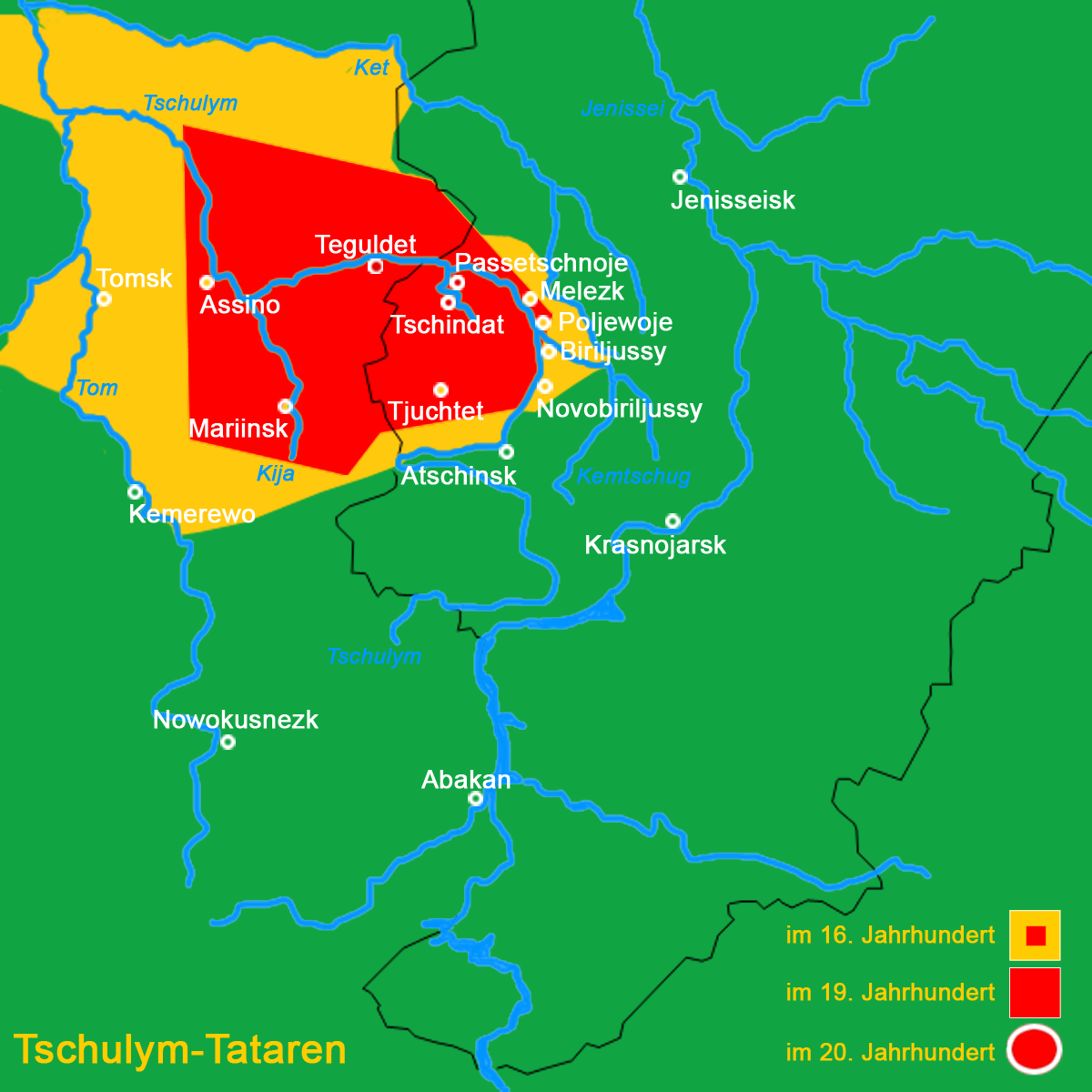
- Distribution of Chulyms throughout time

- Chulym is classified as Critically Endangered by the UNESCO Atlas of the World's Languages in Danger.

Chulym (Chulym: Ось тили, чулым тили, татар тили[, Ös tili, chulym tili, tatar tili; Russian: Чулымский язык), also known as Chulym Tatar, Chulim, Chulym-Turkic (not to be confused with the Kipchak Siberian Tatar language) and Ös, is a critically endangered language of the Chulyms, spoken by no more than 30 people, many of whom are elderly. The names which the people use to refer to themselves are пистиҥ кишилер, pistɪŋ kiʃɪler (our people) and ось кишилер, øs kiʃɪler (Ös people). The native designation for the language is ось тил(и), øs til(ɪ) ~ ø:s til(ɪ), татар тил(и), tatar til(ɪ) and чулым тили chulym til(ɪ).

The language is spoken in Russia at various locations along the Chulym River, usually by indigenous people native to the Chulym river basin.

== Geographic distribution ==
The speakers are located in Russia, in southwestern Siberia, north of the Altay Mountains, in the basin of the Chulym River, a tributary of the Ob River. Chulym speakers reside primarily in Belij Yar, Novoshumilovo, Ozyornoe, and Teguldet, in eastern Tomsk Oblast and Pasechnoye in western Krasnoyarsk Kray. All speakers are bilingual in Russian.

== Classification ==
The Chulym language was considered to belong to the Siberian Turkic group of Turkic languages that also includes Khakas, Shor and Western Yugur languages. Nogorodov et al. argue that Chulym is of Kipchak origins, based on the Leipzig-Jakarta list. This comparison shows that 87 of the 100 items match the Kipchak items, whereas only 67 are cognate to Oghuz Turkic.

The language is closely related to the Shor and Khakas languages. Though all these are considered by some as one language, the Chulym speakers themselves do not believe this to be the case. Lower Chulym had more Tatar influence and Middle Chulym had more Khakas influence. There is also a significant Yeniseic influence on the language, with those who speak Middle Chulym themselves likely being descendants of Yeniseic, Ob Ugric, and Samoyedic speaking peoples who were assimilated and began speaking a Turkic language.

== Dialects ==
Chulym comprises two distinct dialects with multiple sub-dialects, corresponding to locations along the Chulym River. The native ethnonym is given in italics.

- Lower Chulym (extinct)
  - Küärik, küärik jon (Koryukovskaya volost)
  - Ketsik (Kurchikova volost)
  - Yezhi, je:ži jon (Baygul'skaya volost)
  - Yatsi, jatsi jon (Yachinskaya volost)
  - Chibi, tš'ibi d'on (Kyzyldeyeva volost)
- Middle Chulym also known as Ös Chulym
  - Tutal, tutaɫ tš'onu (Tutal'skaya volost, Teguldetsky District, Tomsk Oblast)
  - Melet, pilet tš'onu (Meletskaya volost, Tyukhtetsky District, Krasnoyarsk Krai)

The "Upper Chulym dialect" identified by Harrison & Anderson is in fact the Melet sub-dialect of Middle Chulym. The Chulym-Turkic language is a geographical, rather than linguistic, term. In its diachronic perspective, it comprised a dialectal continuum with the neighboring dialects, showing only slight differentiation, while those at the extremes or the periphery of the area were rather mutually unintelligible. Glottolog classifies the Tutal dialect, spoken in the village of Teguldet, as belonging to Shor, and the Melet dialect, spoken in Pasechnoye, being close to the Kyzyl dialect of Khakas.

== History ==
Chulym was once a widely spoken language, but its history consists of "multiple waves of colonization and linguistic assimilation first into Turkic, and now into Russian". The Chulyms are thought to have shifted from a Yeniseian language to Turkic. Their original language has left influences on modern Chulym, such as place names – especially hydronyms. This shift becomes even more evident when one studies the structure of the language, which is distinguishable from other Siberian Turkic languages. Now, Middle Chulym has become endangered due to the Russian hostility that occurred during the mid-twentieth century. It was during the 1940s, when Joseph Stalin was in power, that there was an establishment of a program called "the second mother tongue policy". This included the act of rounding up children and sending them to boarding schools, where they learned the nation's language and were forced not to speak their own native tongue. The program quickly caused the community to abandon the Chulym language. Soon enough, the language became associated with negative connotations and thus it gained an inferior and low social status. In the film The Linguists, a Chulym native speaker named Vasya Gabov described Chulym as being "viewed as a 'gutter language'," and the language was no longer passed on to the children. Furthermore, in the 1970s, the Chulym community was forced into Russian-speaking settlements, where they had to adapt and speak the Russian language in order to move up in the social ladder and have greater chances of economic prosperity. For instance, Gabov's village, Novotarlagany, was abolished, along with many other Chulym settlements. Soon enough, Chulym speakers were abandoning their native tongue; this caused the community to lose a great number of speakers and their language traditions. Not only were the Chulym people forced to abandon their language, but also the government dropped them from the census statistics as a distinct ethnic group after 1959. Under the eyes of the government, the Chulym population was seen as non-existent, and not enough to earn itself a place as a different national unit; it was not until 1999 that the community regained their status as a separate ethnic entity. Thus, with Russia's urbanization and domination of their national language, the Chulym language's chances of survival are slim.

== Status ==
Chulym is a moribund language and will most likely be extinct by the 2030s. It is listed in the UNESCO Red Book of Endangered Languages. During the filming of the 2008 American documentary film The Linguists, linguists Greg Anderson and K. David Harrison interviewed and recorded 20 speakers and estimated there may be 35 fluent speakers out of a community of overall 426 members. The youngest fluent speaker, Vasya Gabov, was 54 at the time of filming. Lemskaya mentions that Gabov seems to be the youngest speaker of the Tutal dialect, whereas she has found speakers in their late 40s of the Melet dialect (which Anderson & Harrison call 'Upper Chulym').

== Documentation ==
The fact that Chulym had no written indigenous tradition made it even more difficult for the language to endure. It was not until David Harrison and Greg Anderson from the documentary The Linguists that they began using scientific methods to document the Chulym language. The two linguists highlighted the efforts made to preserve the Chulym language and record what language loss meant to the community. The two travel to Tegl'det, a small village where they were able to find three Chulym speakers. It was there that they met Vasya, who was the youngest native Chulym speaker at the time. Their process of documentation included sitting down in private with the speakers and recording them during the interview. Accordingly, in collaboration with Vasya and the other two speakers, the two linguists were able to list words in Chulym such as numbers, greetings, a wool-spinning song, aphorisms, and bear- and moose-hunting stories. They were also able to collect personal narratives, spontaneous conversations, body parts, colors, fauna, flora and kin terms, along with instructions on how to use certain tools such as fur-covered skis and wooden canoes. They also asked the natives to interpret specific sentences, with the intention to identify some of the rules of Chulym grammar. With this, the linguists battled to offset the negative connotations of and attitudes towards the Chulym language.

== Phonology ==
=== Consonants ===
The following table lists the consonants of Chulym, dialectal variations are marked: MC = Middle Chulym dialect, LC = Lower Chulym dialect, K = Küärik subdialect of LC. No data was available for the other dialects. The table was derived from Dul'zon, Pomorska, and Li.

		Labial	Alveolar	Palatal	Velar	Uvular	Glottal
Nasal		m	n	nʲ (MC, K)	ŋ		
Stop	voiceless	p	t	tʲ (LC)	k	q (MC)	ʔ
Stop	voiced	b	d		g		
Fricative	voiceless		s	ʃ	x		h
Fricative	voiced	v	z	ʒ	ɣ	(ʁ)	
Affricate	voiceless		t͡s	t͡ʃ			
Affricate	voiced		d͡z (LC)	d͡ʒ (MC)			
Approximant			l	j			
Rhotic			r				

/k/ may also have an allophone of [q] when in back-vowel positions.

/h/ is only found medially and finally, it is the result of secondary spirantization.

/r/ can be heard as a trill [r] or a flap [ɾ].

/ɣ/ can be heard as uvular [ʁ] in free variation.

/q/ can be heard as a fricative [χ] in final positions.

The phonetic value of /v/ is uncertain, but Dul'zon lists it as bilabial /β/. Either way, it may be heard as [v] or [β].

Dul'zon also includes voiceless nasal /m̥/ and voiceless liquids /r̥/ and /l̥/, these are not found in the more recent publication of Pomorska.

=== Vowels ===
	Front		Back	
	unrounded	rounded	unrounded	rounded
High	i, iː	y, yː	ɯ, ɯː	u, uː
Mid	e, eː	ø, øː		o, oː
Low	æ, æː (LC)		a, aː	

[æ, æː] are said to also be allophones of /e, eː/ across dialects.

/a/ may also be heard as [ə] in unstressed position.

== Writing system ==
Cyrillic alphabet (Tutal dialect):
А а	Б б	В в	Г г	Ғ ғ	Д д	Дж дж	Е е	Ё ё	Ж ж
З з	И и	Й й	К к	Л л	М м	Н н	Ҥ ҥ	О о	П п
Р р	С с	Т т	У у	Ф ф	Ц ц	Ч ч	Ш ш	Щ щ	Ъ ъ
Ы ы	Ь ь	Э э	Ю ю	Я я

== Morphology ==
=== Pronouns ===
Personal pronouns
Singular		Plural	
Chulym (translit.)	English	Chulym (translit.)	English
Мян (mæn)	I	Пис (pis)	We
Сян (sæn)	You (informal sg.)	Силяр (silær)	You (pl. or formal sg.)
Ол (ol)	He/She/It	Олар (olar)	They

Declension of pronouns
	Singular			Plural		
	1st	2nd	3rd	1st	2nd	3rd
Nom	Мян	Сян	Ол	Пис	Силяр	Олар
Gen	Меҥ	Сеҥ	(Ол) аныҥ	Пистиҥ	Силярниҥ	Оларныҥ

=== Aktionsart ===
Like many other Turkic languages, Chulym expresses aktionsart through auxiliary verbs. Polyverbal constructions with actionable characteristics can express "state" (S), "process" (P), "entering a state" (ES), "entering a process" (EP) and "multiplicative process" (MP). This is recognized as universal in Turkic languages. S, P, ES and EP reflect episodic actions, whereas MP are habitual. ES and EP only seem to occur in the perfective aspect, while the others occur in both perfective and imperfective.

Aux. Verb		Gloss	Aktionsart		Aspect
MC	LC	Gloss	Perfective	Imperfective	Aspect
al-		to take	ES	MP (Melet)	Reflexive benefactive (SBEN); Sudden entry into a state (PNCT)
tʃat-	jat-	to lie down	S, P (LC)	S, P (MC)	Durative (DUR)
tʃør-	jør-	to walk	ES (LC), P (Tutal)	P, MP (Melet)	Iterative durative (DUR.ITER)
ɯs-	ɯj-	to send	ES, EP (MC)	S (Melet)	Inchoative (INCH)
kal-		to remain	ES, EP (LC, Tutal)	–	Resultative (RES)
kɛl-		to arrive	ES (Melet)	–	Purposive (PURP)
kør-		to see	EP (Tutal)	P (Tutal)	Conative (CON)
olur-	ot-	to sit	S (LC)	S (LC), P (Melet)	Progressive (PROG)
par-		to leave	ES	S, P (LC)	Durative (DUR)
pɛr-		to give	ES, EP (LC)	P (LC)	Inchoative (INCH)
sal-		to place	ES	P (LC, Tutal)	Telic (TEL)
tur-		to stand	S (LC), P (Melet)	S (LC), P (Melet)	Delimitative (DLMT)

== Syntax ==
Chulym uses SOV word order and post-positions, just like many of the neighboring Turkic and Tatar languages.

== Vocabulary ==
As its speakers lose more and more knowledge of their language because of the language devalorization process described above, Chulym has borrowed a large number of Russian words in recent years. Most commonly, interjections and discourse markers are borrowed from Russian, in addition to concepts that have no corresponding Chulym words.

== Media ==
The Siberian folk band Otyken are known for singing in the Chulym language. The word 'otyken' is a Chulym word meaning 'a sacred place where warriors would discard their weapons and debate'. There is an ongoing effort by the Living Tongues Institute to write a book in Chulym and make it available through mass media.

== Sample text ==
Chulym	Common Turkic alphabet	English
Артян туруп, кун гарагы шикпанча мян мылтыгын ап чердюпскем кольге, кольдя мен камям полган камя олуруп, амьда парыдым, анды корьзям алыч cуудун шиктыр, мян камезын кырга пурнуп, мылтыгын ап чакшилын кёзюмь, тынледыбжабалгам мен, алыч ойдашпаган мян пир канза тартап, анзондын пичаг ап аны cоюп, эедын камезимге cап апьке чан паган. Мены апьта апьчим угланеры cаганнар.	Ärtän turup, kün garagı şıkpânça män mıltığın ap çerdüpskem kölge, köldä mêñ kämäm polğan kämä olurup ämdä parıdım, andı körzäm alıç sûdun şıktır, män kämezın kırga purnup, mıltığın ap çakşılın közüp tıñledıbjabalğam men, alıç oydaş pağan män pir kanza tartap, anzondın pıçağ ap anı soyup, êdın kämezimge sap äpke çan pağam. Menı äpta äpçim uglanerı sağınğannar.	I got up in the morning before the sun rose. I took my gun and set off to the lake. My boat was at the lake. I sat in my boat and set off. Then I look: a moose is coming out of the water. I landed the boat on the bank.
