= Novy Tevriz =

Novy Tevriz Новый Тевриз
- Rural locality
- Interactive map of Novy Tevriz
- Location of Novy Tevriz Novy Tevriz (Tomsk Oblast)
- Coordinates: 59.14139°N 77.52701°E
- Country: Russia
- Federal subject: Tomsk Oblast
- Administrative district: Kargasoksky District

Population
  - Estimate (2021): 65 )
- Time zone: UTC+7 (MSK+4)
- Postal code: 636735
- OKTMO ID: 69624452111

Novy Tevriz (Russian: Новый Тевриз) is a rural locality (a selo) in Kargasoksky District of Tomsk Oblast, Russia, located on the left bank of the Vasyugan River, 190 kilometers (120 mi) from Kargasok, the administrative center of the district.

It was founded by exiles from what is now Tevrizsky District in Omsk Oblast, who gave it its name, meaning "New Tevriz".
