= Kruchinin =

Kruchinin, feminine: Kruchinina is a Russian surname. Notable people with the surname include:

- Andrei Kruchinin, Kazakhstani-born Russian ice hockey player
- Alexei Kruchinin (born 1991), Russian ice hockey player
- Kseniya Kruchinina, soloist of Aina (Russian band)
- Valentin Kruchinin (1892–1970), Soviet composer

== Fictional characters ==
- Elena Kruchinina, fictional actress, the protagonist in the 1945 Soviet film Guilty Without Guilt
