= Vasyugan =

River in the southern West Siberian Plain of Russia

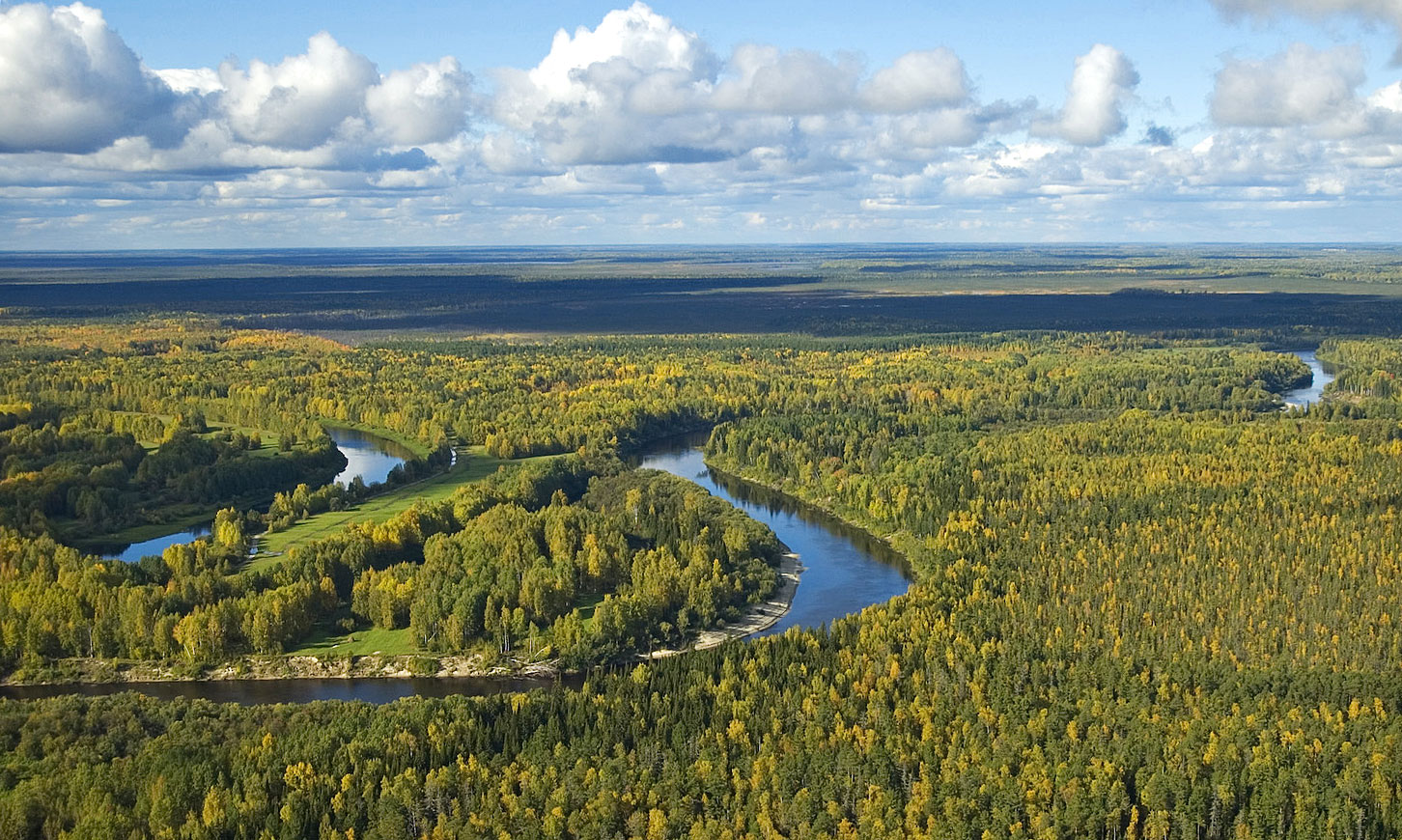

Location
- Country: Russia

Physical characteristics
- Mouth: Ob
  - coordinates: 59.0931°N 80.7069°E
- Length: 1,082 km (672 mi)
- Basin size: 61,800 km^{2} (23,900 sq mi)

Basin features
- Progression: Ob→ Kara Sea

The Vasyugan (Russian: Васюга́н) is a river in the southern West Siberian Plain of Russia, a left tributary of the Ob. Its course from its source in the Vasyugan Swamp is entirely within the Kargasok district of Tomsk Oblast.

== Statistics ==
The river is 1,082 kilometres (672 mi) long and is navigable upriver for 886 kilometres (551 mi) from the mouth. The Vasyugan drains a basin of 61,800 square kilometres (23,900 mi^{2}). Average annual runoff: 345 m^{3}/c, 10.9 km^{3}/year.

Tributaries:

- Right hand: Yelizarovka, Petryak, Yershovka, Kalganak, Pyonorovka, Nyurolka, Zimnyaya, Chizhapka, Pasil, Silga, Naushka, Kochebilovka, Lozunga.
- Left hand: Bolshoy Petryak, Listvenka, Korovya, Staritsa, Garchak, Kyn, Glukhaya, Chertala, Yagylyakh, Yegolyakh, Olenyovka, Kelvat, Lontynyakh, Katylga, Cheremshanka, Prudovaya, Makhnya, Martynovka, Varingyogan, Yokhomyakh, Chebachya, Kacharma, Malaya Kuletka.

Municipalities (downstream from source): Novy Vasyugan, Aypolovo, Novy Tevriz, Sredny Vasyugan, Staraya Beryozovka, Ust-Chizhapka, Naunak, Bolshaya Griva, Staroyugino, Novoyugino, Bondarka.

== Literature ==
- Evseeva NS Geography of Tomsk region. (Natural conditions and resources). - Tomsk: TSU, 2001, 223 pp.
