= Spirtovka =

River in Tomsk Oblast, Russia

Coordinates: 57.2292°N 81.3994°E

The Spirtovka River (Russian: река Спиртовка) is a small river in Tomsk Oblast, Russia. Its length is 11 km. It flows into the Parbig, a tributary of the Chaya.
