= Novy Vasyugan =

Rural locality in Kargasoksky District, Tomsk Oblast, Russia

Coordinates: 58.5767°N 76.4969°E

Novy Vasyugan (Russian: Новый Васюган) is a rural locality (a selo) in Kargasoksky District of Tomsk Oblast, Russia, located on the Vasyugan River 370 kilometers (230 mi) from Kargasok, the administrative center of the district. Population: 2,265 (2012 est.).

== History ==
It was founded in 1933 as a settlement for convicts and was initially called Mogilny Yar (Могильный Яр). Until 1959, it served as the administrative center of Vasyugansky District, which was later merged into Kargasoksky District.
