= Nyurolka =

Location
- Country: Russia
- Region: Tomsk Oblast

Physical characteristics
- Mouth: Vasyugan
  - coordinates: 59.0842°N 78.975°E
- Length: 399 km (248 mi)
- Basin size: 8,110 km^{2} (3,130 sq mi)

Basin features
- Progression: Vasyugan→ Ob→ Kara Sea

The Nyurolka is a river in Tomsk Oblast, Russia, a right tributary of the Vasyugan. It is 399 kilometres (248 mi) long, and has a drainage basin of 8,110 square kilometres (3,130 sq mi).
