= Teguldetsky District =

Teguldetsky District Тегульдетский район (Russian)
- District
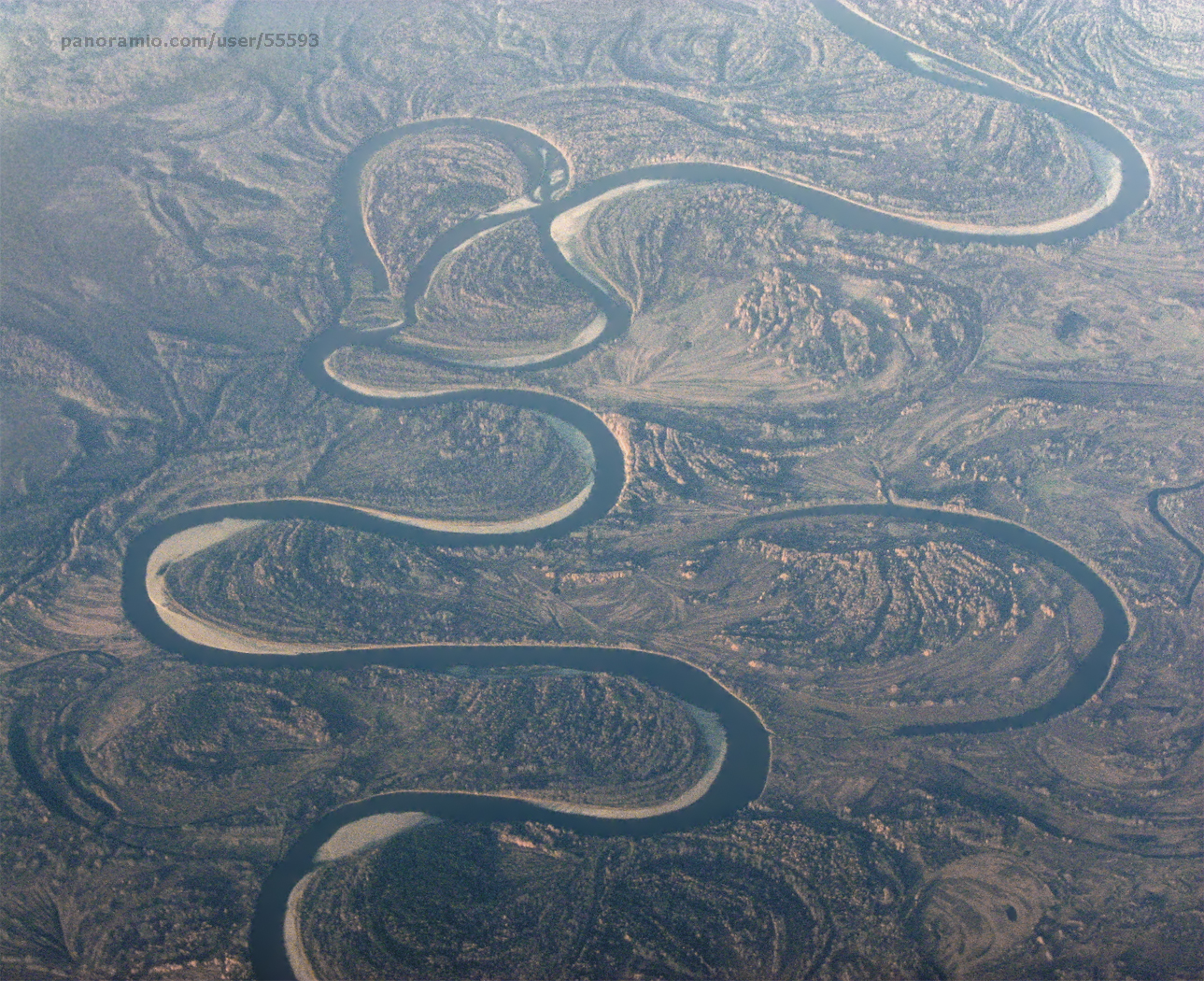
- Meandering Chulym River in Teguldetsky District as seen from the air

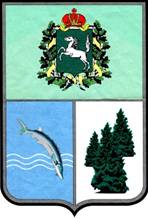
- Coat of arms
- Location of Teguldetsky District in Tomsk Oblast
- Coordinates: 57°22′N 88°18′E
- Country: Russia
- Federal subject: Tomsk Oblast
- Established: 1936
- Administrative center: Teguldet

Area
  - Total: 12,271.1 km^{2} (4,737.9 sq mi)

Population (2010 Census)
  - Total: 6,937
  - Estimate (January 2015): 6,370
  - Density: 0.5653/km^{2} (1.464/sq mi)
  - Urban: 0%
  - Rural: 100%

Administrative structure
  - Inhabited localities: 14 rural localities

Municipal structure
  - Municipally incorporated as: Teguldetsky Municipal District
  - Municipal divisions: 0 urban settlements, 4 rural settlements
- Time zone: UTC+7 (MSK+4)
- OKTMO ID: 69652000
- Website: http://teguldet.tomsk.ru

Population of Teguldetsky District
- 2010 Census: 6,937
- 2002 Census: 8,357
- 1989 Census: 9,175
- 1979 Census: 9,757

Teguldetsky District (Russian: Тегульде́тский райо́н) is an administrative and municipal district (raion), one of the sixteen in Tomsk Oblast, Russia. It is located in the east of the oblast and borders Verkhneketsky District in the north, Krasnoyarsk Krai in the east, Kemerovo Oblast in the south, and Zyryansky and Pervomaysky Districts in the west. The area of the district is 12,271.1 square kilometers (4,737.9 sq mi). Its administrative center is the rural locality (a selo) of Teguldet. As of the 2010 Census, the total population of the district was 6,937, with the population of Teguldet accounting for 63.2% of that number.

== History ==
The district was established in 1936.
