= Podgornoye, Tomsk Oblast =

Podgornoye Подгорное
- Selo
- Interactive map of Podgornoye
- Location of Podgornoye Podgornoye (Tomsk Oblast)
- Coordinates: 57°48′N 82°38′E
- Country: Russia
- Federal subject: Tomsk Oblast
- Administrative district: Chainsky District

Population (2010 Census)
  - Total: 4,983
  - Estimate (2021): 4,787 (−3.9%)

Administrative status
  - Capital of: Chainsky District
- Time zone: UTC+7 (MSK+4)
- Postal code: 636400
- OKTMO ID: 69656450101

Podgornoye (Russian: Подго́рное) is a rural locality (a selo) and the administrative center of Chainsky District in Tomsk Oblast, Russia. Population: 4,983 (2010 census); 5,009 (2002 census); 6,230 (1989 Soviet census).

== Geography ==
The confluence of rivers Chaya and Iksa is located close to the village.
