= Frantsevo =

Frantsevo Францево
- Village
- Interactive map of Frantsevo
- Location of Frantsevo Frantsevo (Tomsk Oblast)
- Coordinates: 57°33′45″N 86°24′30″E
- Country: Russia
- Federal subject: Tomsk Oblast

Population
  - Estimate (2015): 97 )
- Time zone: UTC+7 (MSK+4)
- Postal code: 636942
- OKTMO ID: 69648422121

Frantsevo (Russian: Францево) is a village in the Pervomaysky District, Tomsk Oblast. It is part of the Komsomolsk selo.

== History ==
The village was historically served by the Komsomol Narrow Gauge Rail, until its destruction by the logging company that owned it in 2015.

== Population ==
Historical population
Year	Pop.	±%
2002	177	—
2010	107	−39.5%
2012	104	−2.8%
2013	102	−1.9%
2014	99	−2.9%
2015	97	−2.0%

In 2015, its population was reported at 97 people, down from 104 in 2012.
