= Pervomaysky District, Tomsk Oblast =

Pervomaysky District Первомайский район (Russian)
- District
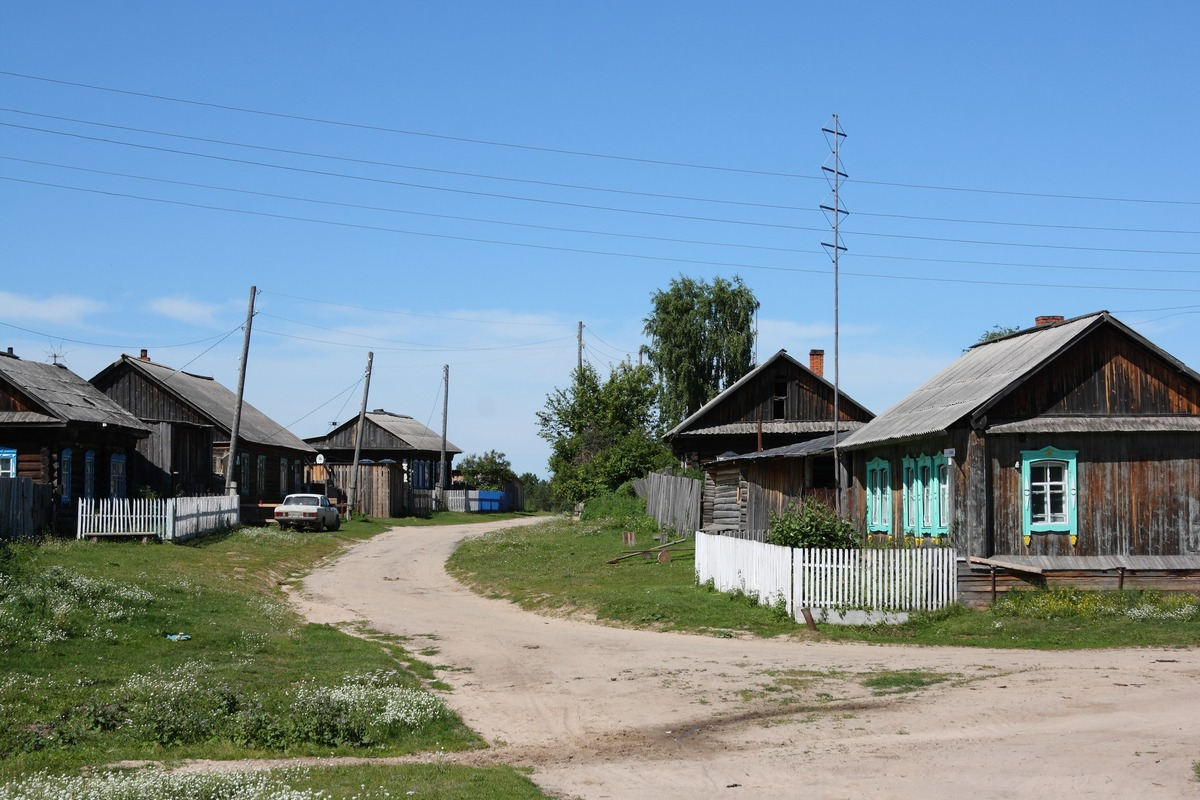
- Kuanovo, Pervomaysky District

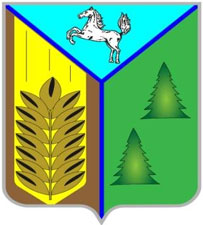
- Coat of arms
- Location of Pervomaysky District in Tomsk Oblast
- Coordinates: 57°04′N 86°14′E
- Country: Russia
- Federal subject: Tomsk Oblast
- Established: 1965
- Administrative center: Pervomayskoye

Area
  - Total: 15,600 km^{2} (6,000 sq mi)

Population (2010 Census)
  - Total: 18,947
  - Density: 1.21/km^{2} (3.15/sq mi)
  - Urban: 0%
  - Rural: 100%

Administrative structure
  - Inhabited localities: 43 rural localities

Municipal structure
  - Municipally incorporated as: Pervomaysky Municipal District
  - Municipal divisions: 0 urban settlements, 6 rural settlements
- Time zone: UTC+7 (MSK+4)
- OKTMO ID: 69648000
- Website: http://pmr.tomsk.ru/

Pervomaysky District (Russian: Первома́йский райо́н) is an administrative and municipal district (raion), one of the sixteen in Tomsk Oblast, Russia. It is located in the east of the oblast. The area of the district is 15,600 square kilometers (6,000 sq mi). Its administrative center is the rural locality (a selo) of Pervomayskoye. Population: 18,947 (2010 Census); 21,260 (2002 census); 23,350 (1989 Soviet census). The population of Pervomayskoye accounts for 29.8% of the district's total population.

== Administrative Divisions ==
The district is divided into six rural settlements: Komsomolsk, Kuyanovskoye [ru], Novomariinsky [ru], Pervomayskoye, Sergeevskoye [ru], and Ulu-Yulsky [ru]. These rural settlements are then further divided into 45 settlements.

== History ==
Prior to Russian settlement, the area of present-day Pervomaysky was inhabited largely by Chulyms. Unconfirmed stories suggest that the first Chulym village in the region was around 1600. The district was first established on June 22, 1939 as the Pyshkino-Troitsky District. The district was abolished on December 17, 1962, but was restored in January 1965 under its current name.

== Geography ==
Pervomaysky District is 15,554.18 square kilometers in area, of which, 83.5% is forest. The forests of Pervomaysky are composed primarily of birch and aspen trees, although cedar, spruce and fir trees are also common. The district sits on the eastern banks of the Chulym River, a tributary of the Ob River.

== Demographics ==
Pervomaysky District is rural in nature, home to four settlements with more than 1,000 people: Pervomayskoye, Komsomolsk, Belyay, and Ulu-Yul. Population decline is a threat to many smaller settlements in the area, with the district government recognizing 17 villages at risk. These villages, with populations of less than 100 people each, are also characterized by populations typically beyond the working age, as well as an absence, or under-developed social and economic infrastructure. The area is home to 11 villages which now lay abandoned due to population decline.

== Economy ==
Pervomaysky's economy is largely dependent on agriculture and logging. There are a number of kolkhoz in the district, as well as a number of lumber firms. The district is home to 23,600 hectares of cropland, which primarily grow cereals, legumes, potatoes and vegetables. The area is also home to some deposits of natural minerals, such as sand, gravel, clay, chalk, brown coal, peat, and limestone.

== Transport ==
The district is connected via rail to the nearby city of Asino.

== See also ==
- Frantsevo
