= Vasyugan Plain =

Plain in Russia

Coordinates: 57.34°N 75.39°E

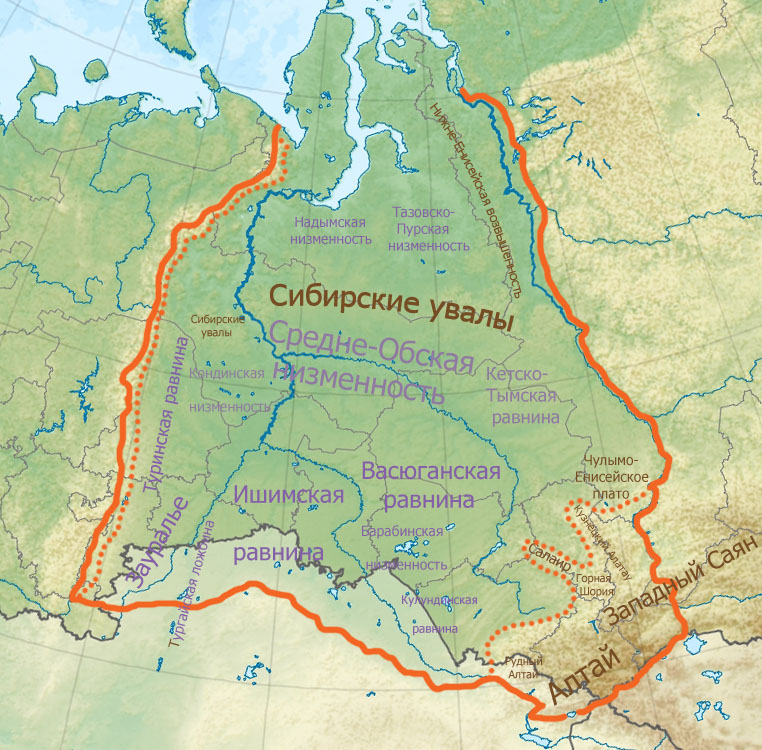
West Siberian Plain

The Vasyugan Plain or Vasyuganye (Russian: Васюганье) is the vast area of the Ob-Irtysh interfluve that covers the basin of the Vasyugan river. It is part of the West Siberian Plain and lies within the Novosibirsk, Omsk, and Tomsk oblasts of Russia. To the south it transitions into the Baraba Steppe (Baraba Lowland). Most of its territory is occupied the Vasyugan Swamp.

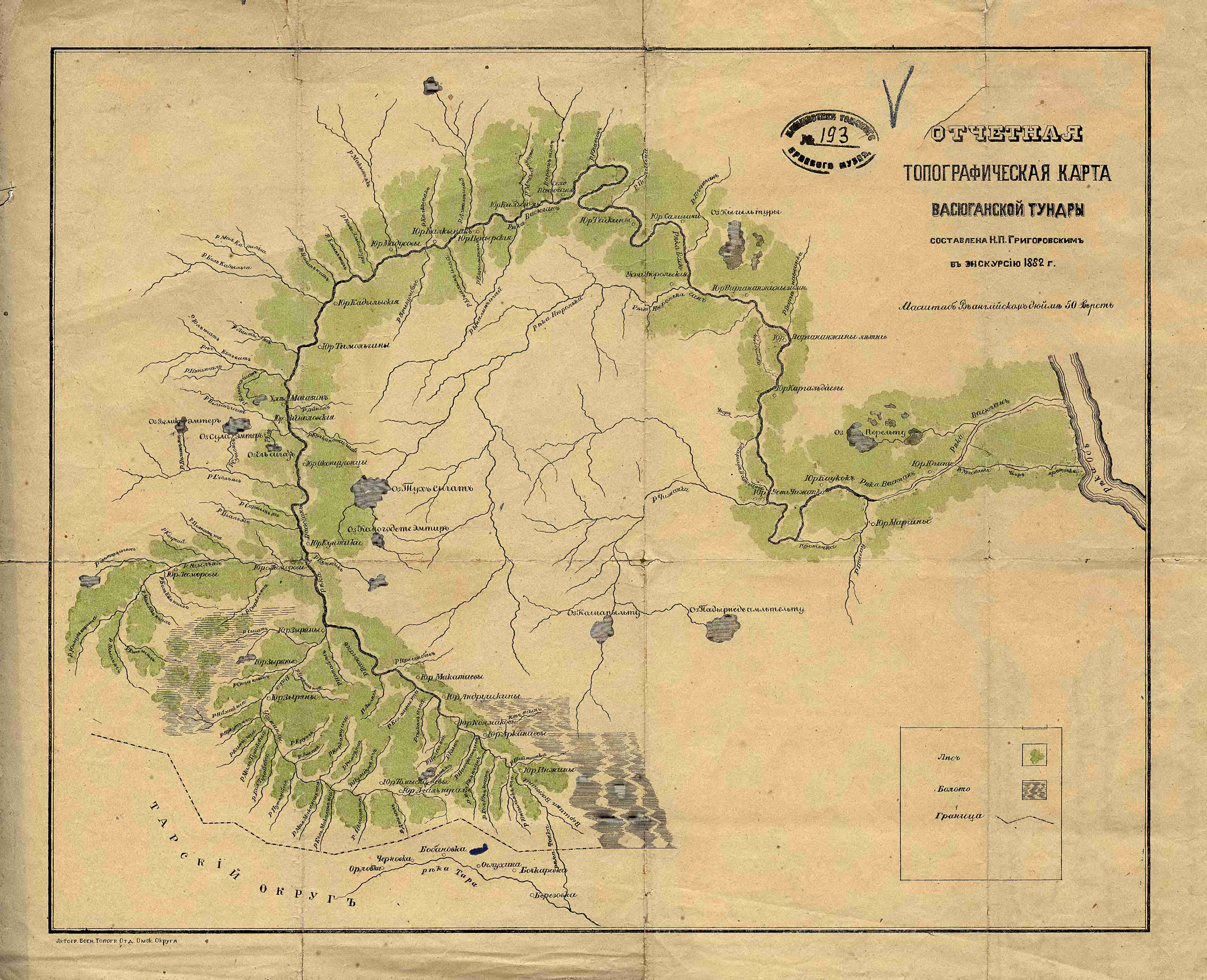
Vasyugan tundra

The nearly circular area around Vasyugan is known as Vasyugan steppe or Vasyugan tundra.

The Vasyugan nature reserve of area 614,803 hectares is in the middle of the plain, established on December 16, 2017. It includes areas of the Vasyugan Swamp.
