= Krivosheino =

Krivosheino (Russian: Кривошеино) is the name of several rural localities in Russia:

- Krivosheino, Kaluga Oblast, a village in Zhukovsky District of Kaluga Oblast
- Krivosheino, Moscow, a village in Pervomayskoye Settlement of Troitsky Administrative Okrug of the federal city of Moscow
- Krivosheino, Moscow Oblast, a village in Kolyubakinskoye Rural Settlement of Ruzsky District of Moscow Oblast
- Krivosheino, Novgorod Oblast, a village in Kabozhskoye Settlement of Khvoyninsky District of Novgorod Oblast
- Krivosheino, Tomsk Oblast, a selo in Krivosheinsky District of Tomsk Oblast
