= Krivosheinskaya =

Krivosheinskaya Кривошеинская
- Village
- Location within Vologda Oblast Location within Russia
- Coordinates: 60°37′N 43°14′E
- Country: Russia
- Region: Vologda Oblast
- District: Tarnogsky District
- Time zone: UTC+3:00

Krivosheinskaya (Russian: Кривошеинская) is a rural locality (a village) in Spasskoye Rural Settlement, Tarnogsky District, Vologda Oblast, Russia. The population was 13 as of 2002.

== Geography ==
Krivosheinskaya is located 27 km northwest of Tarnogsky Gorodok (the district's administrative centre) by road. Denisovskaya is the nearest rural locality.
