= Pervomayskoye, Tomsk Oblast =

Rural locality in Tomsk Oblast, Russia

Coordinates: 57°04′28″N 86°14′10″E

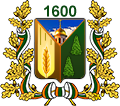
Coat of arms of Pervomayskoye

Pervomayskoye (Russian: Первомайское) is a rural locality (a selo) and the administrative center of Pervomaysky District, Tomsk Oblast, Russia. Population: 5,641 (2010 census); 5,800 (2002 census); 5,851 (1989 Soviet census).

== Climate ==
Climate data for Pervomayskoye (extremes 1936-present)
Month	Jan	Feb	Mar	Apr	May	Jun	Jul	Aug	Sep	Oct	Nov	Dec	Year
Record high °C (°F)	4.0 (39.2)	7.4 (45.3)	15.9 (60.6)	29.3 (84.7)	35.0 (95.0)	35.8 (96.4)	35.3 (95.5)	33.6 (92.5)	31.6 (88.9)	22.6 (72.7)	10.4 (50.7)	5.0 (41.0)	35.8 (96.4)
Mean daily maximum °C (°F)	−13.5 (7.7)	−9.0 (15.8)	−0.2 (31.6)	8.8 (47.8)	17.3 (63.1)	23.4 (74.1)	25.5 (77.9)	22.3 (72.1)	14.9 (58.8)	6.0 (42.8)	−5.0 (23.0)	−11.3 (11.7)	6.6 (43.9)
Daily mean °C (°F)	−17.9 (−0.2)	−14.2 (6.4)	−6.2 (20.8)	2.6 (36.7)	10.3 (50.5)	16.9 (62.4)	19.2 (66.6)	15.9 (60.6)	9.1 (48.4)	1.8 (35.2)	−8.7 (16.3)	−15.3 (4.5)	1.1 (34.0)
Mean daily minimum °C (°F)	−21.5 (−6.7)	−18.2 (−0.8)	−11.1 (12.0)	−2.3 (27.9)	4.7 (40.5)	11.2 (52.2)	13.6 (56.5)	10.9 (51.6)	4.9 (40.8)	−1.3 (29.7)	−11.8 (10.8)	−18.9 (−2.0)	−3.3 (26.0)
Record low °C (°F)	−52.0 (−61.6)	−52.6 (−62.7)	−41.0 (−41.8)	−30.1 (−22.2)	−12.2 (10.0)	−3.0 (26.6)	2.1 (35.8)	−2.4 (27.7)	−8.2 (17.2)	−27.0 (−16.6)	−50.8 (−59.4)	−52.0 (−61.6)	−52.6 (−62.7)
Average precipitation mm (inches)	20.5 (0.81)	16.8 (0.66)	17.6 (0.69)	25.1 (0.99)	41.8 (1.65)	58.4 (2.30)	66.9 (2.63)	58.0 (2.28)	49.0 (1.93)	38.2 (1.50)	41.5 (1.63)	31.0 (1.22)	464.8 (18.29)
Source: pogoda.ru.net
