= Vasyugan Swamp =

Large freshwater swamp in Siberia (Russia)

Coordinates: 57°14′N 76°30′E

Location in Russia

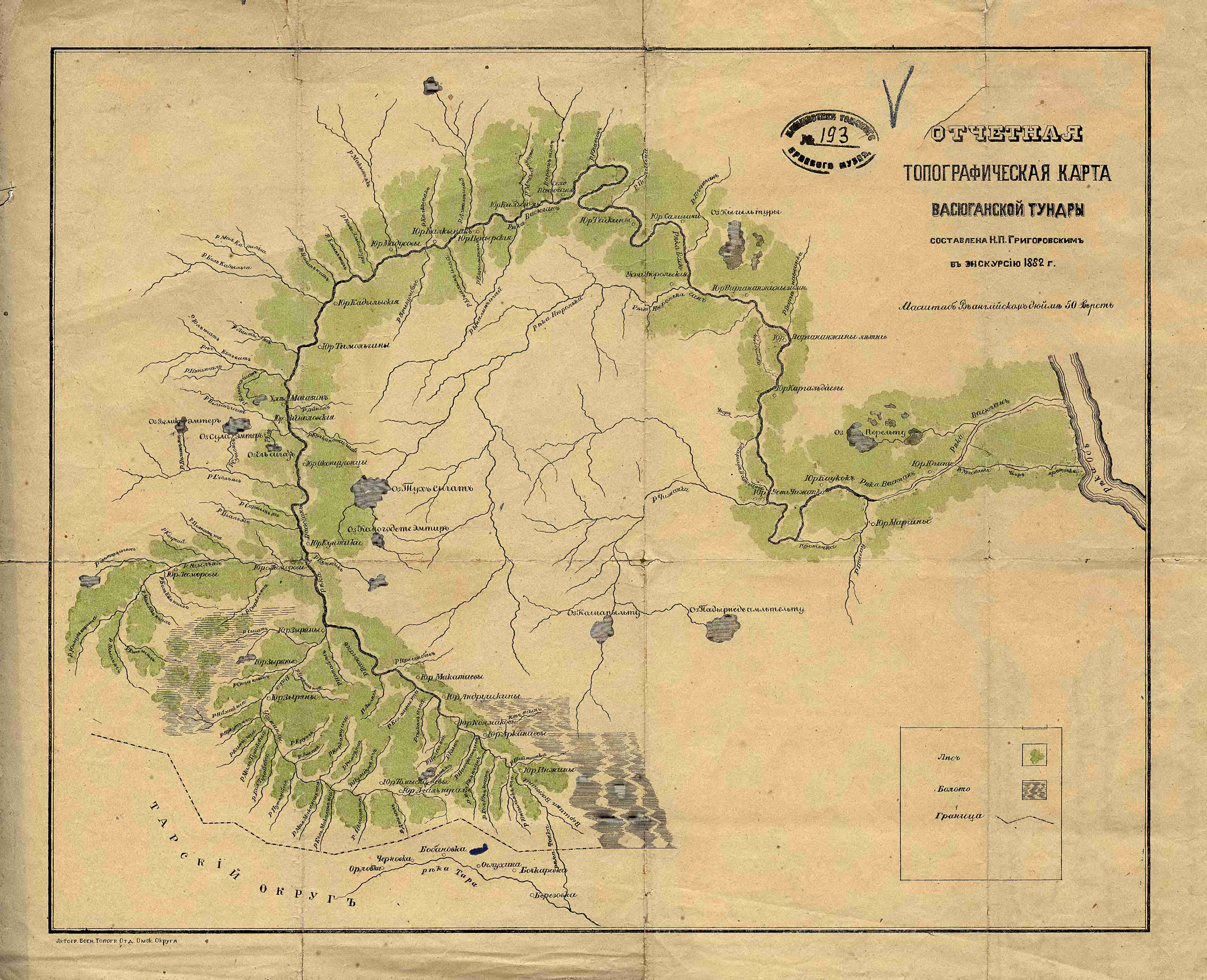
Map of Vasyugan tundra, 1882

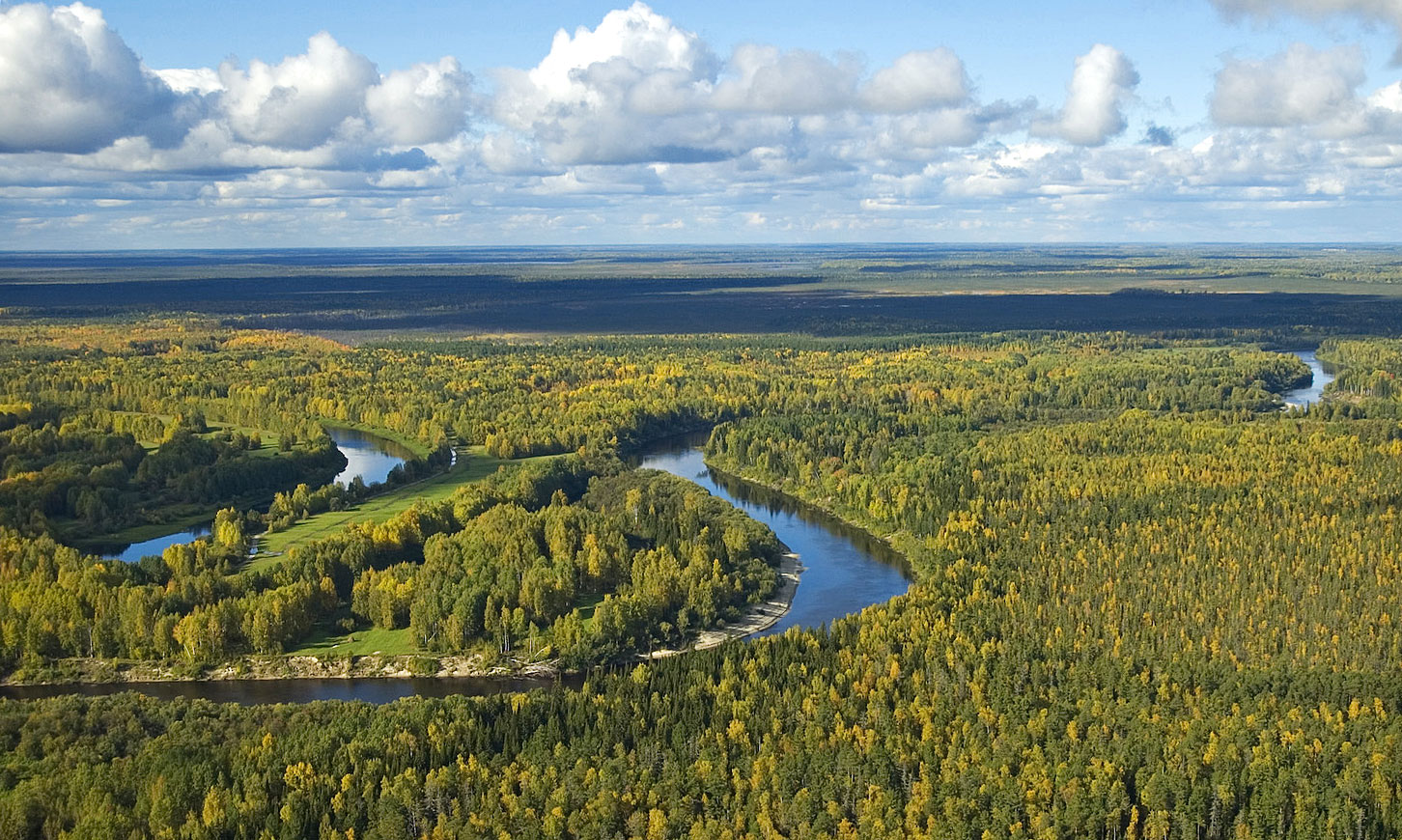
Vasyugan

The Vasyugan Swamp (Russian: Васюганские болота, romanized: Vasyuganskiye bolota), also called the Great Vasyugan Mire, is the largest swamp in the northern hemisphere as well as the largest peatland in the world. It is located in Russia, in southwestern Siberia. Covering most of the Vasyugan Plain, it occupies 53,000 km^{2} (13,000,000 acres), which is about 2% of the whole area of peat bogs of the world. The swamp is located in the Novosibirsk, Omsk, and Tomsk regions of Russia within the watershed of the Ob and Irtysh Rivers, and stretches between latitudes 55°35' and 58°40' North, and longitudes 74°30' and 83°30' East.

== History ==
It appeared nearly 10,000 years ago and from that time has constantly increased in size. 75% of the contemporary area became waterlogged less than 500 years ago.

== Environment ==
The swamp is a major reservoir of fresh water for the region, and the Vasyugan has its source there. It is home to a number of endangered species which is a concern among local environmentalists as the production of oil and gas has become a major industry in the region.

The swamp has a continental climate (Walter system) or taiga (WWF system), with long cold winters and short hot summers.
