= Aina (Russian band) =

Russian ethno-music group

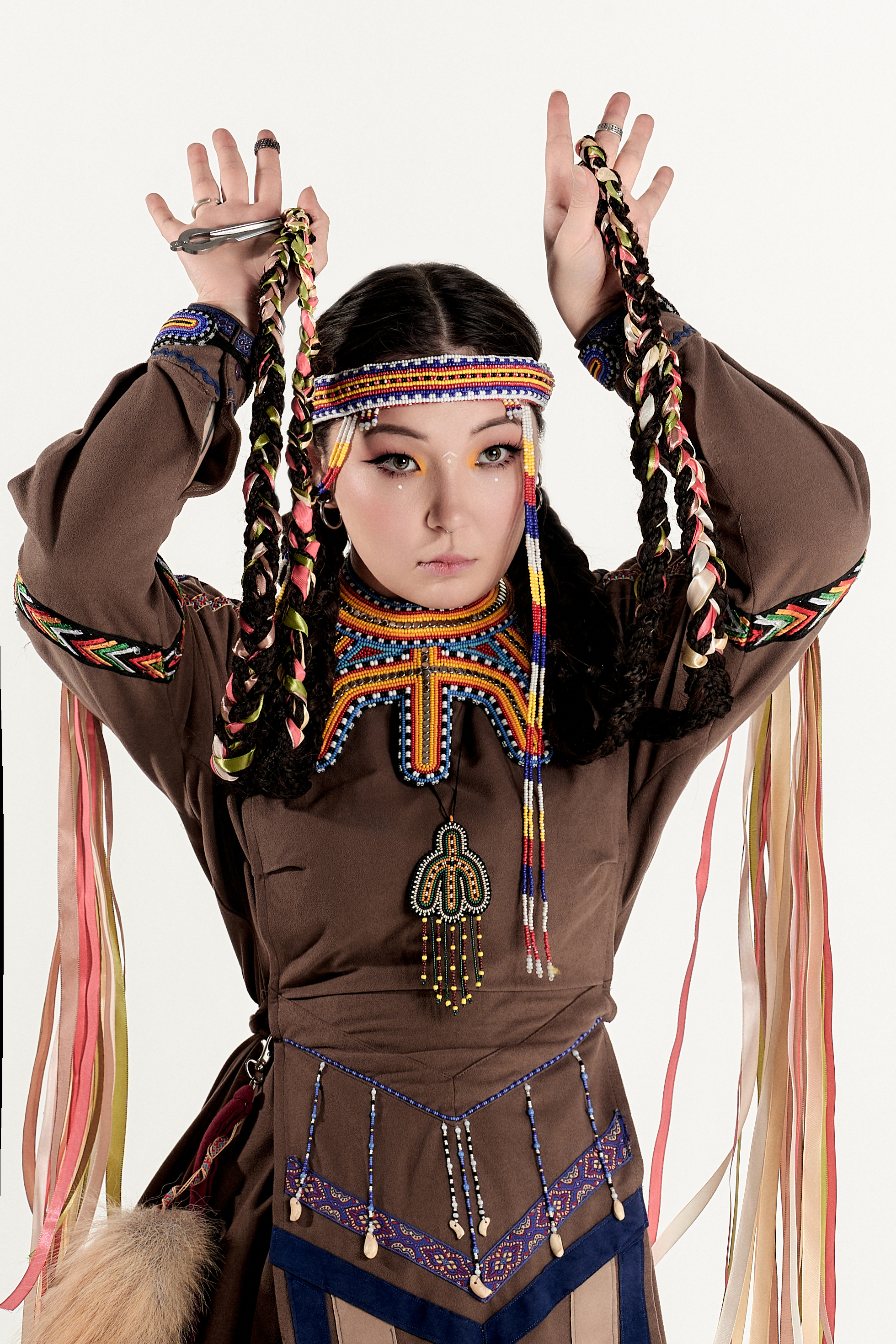
Kseniya Kruchinina, soloist of Aina

Aina (stylized as AINA) is a Russian ethno-music group founded in 2022 in Krasnoyarsk. They sing in Evenki and Russian.

The band sings both folk songs and their own compositions, including songs with lyrics of Evenki poets.

== Members ==
- Kseniya Kruchinina - vocals, throat singing, jaw harp
- Grigory Zelenko - bass guitar
- Yuliy Razborov - electric guitar
- Nikita Platonov - drums
- Artemy Novosyolov - sound producer
- Elina Kanzychakova - producer

=== Kseniya Kruchinina ===
The soloist of the band, Kseniya Kruchinina. Kruchinina was born in Tura, Krasnoyarsk Krai, the administrative center of Evenkiysky District. She is of Evenki ethnicity and Aina is her stage name meaning "[woman-]savior" in Evenki.

During 2017–2021, Kruchinina was a member of ethno-music group Otyken under the stage name Aisylu.

== Albums ==
- 2023: Nordstar
- 2024: Ekonda
