= Ust-Chizhapka =

Ust-Chizhapka Усть-Чижапка
- Selo
- Interactive map of Ust-Chizhapka
- Location of Ust-Chizhapka Ust-Chizhapka (Tomsk Oblast)
- Coordinates: 58°59′54″N 79°36′40″E
- Country: Russia
- Federal subject: Tomsk Oblast
- Administrative district: Kargasoksky District

Population
  - Estimate (2021): 32 )
- Time zone: UTC+7 (MSK+4)
- Postal code: 636730
- Dialing code: +7 38253
- OKTMO ID: 69624484106

Ust-Chizhapka (Russian: Усть-Чижапка) is a rural locality (a selo) in Kargasoksky District of Tomsk Oblast, Russia.

In December 1931, 114 families lived in Ust-Chizhapka.
