= Chaya (Ob) =

River in Tomsk Oblast, Russia

Chaya Чая
- Mouth location in Tomsk Oblast, Russia

Location
- Country: Russia

Physical characteristics
- Mouth: Ob
  - coordinates: 58°16′57″N 82°37′36″E
- Length: 194 km (121 mi)
- Basin size: 27,200 km^{2} (10,500 sq mi)

Basin features
- Progression: Ob→ Kara Sea

The Chaya (Russian: Чая) is a left tributary of the Ob river in Russia. The river is 194 kilometres (121 mi) long and has a catchment area of 27,200 square kilometres (10,500 sq mi).

== Course ==
The Chaya is formed by the confluence of the 320 km (200 mi) long Parbig and the 348 km (216 mi) long Bakchar rivers. It flows in a roughly northern or northeastern direction along its course. Finally it meets the left bank of the Ob 2,403 km (1,493 mi) from the Ob's mouth. The basin of the river is located in the Chainsky and Kolpashevsky districts of Tomsk Oblast.

=== Tributaries ===
The main tributaries of the Chaya are the 179 km (111 mi) long Nyursa (Нюрса) on the left, as well as the 430 km (270 mi) long Iksa (Икса) on the right.

== See also ==
- List of rivers of Russia
