= Samus (rural locality) =

Samus Самусь
- Settlement
- Interactive map of Samus
- Location of Samus Samus (Tomsk Oblast)
- Coordinates: 56°45′00″N 84°42′00″E
- Country: Russia
- Federal subject: Tomsk Oblast

Population (2010 Census)
  - Total: 5,797
  - Estimate (2021): 5,442 (−6.1%)

Administrative status
  - Subordinated to: Seversk City Under Oblast Jurisdiction
- Time zone: UTC+7 (MSK+4)
- Postal code: 634501
- OKTMO ID: 69741000116

Samus (Russian: Самусь) is a rural locality (a settlement) under the administrative jurisdiction of Seversk City Under Oblast Jurisdiction in Tomsk Oblast, Russia, located on the Tom River, 20 kilometers (12 mi) north of Seversk proper. Population: 5,797 (2010 census); 5,690 (2002 census); 5,837 (1989 Soviet census).
