= 86th Kvartal =

86th Kvartal 86-й Квартал
- Settlement
- Location within Tomsk Oblast Location within Russia
- Coordinates: 56.373611°N 84.558333°E
- Country: Russia
- Region: Tomsk Oblast
- District: Tomsky District
- Time zone: UTC+7:00

86th Kvartal (Russian: 86-й Квартал) is a rural locality (a settlement) in Zorkaltsevskoye Rural Settlement of Tomsky District, Russia. The population was 136 as of 2015.

== Streets ==
- Zelyonaya
- Lesnaya
- Shkolnaya
- Tsentralnaya
- Traktovaya
- Rabochaya
- Mira
- Zelyonyy Pereulok
- Sosnovaya

== Geography ==
86th Kvartal is located 38 km southwest of Tomsk (the district's administrative centre) by road. Yubileyny is the nearest rural locality.
