= Komsomolsk, Tomsk Oblast =

Komsomolsk Комсомольск
- Selo
- Interactive map of Komsomolsk
- Location of Komsomolsk Komsomolsk (Tomsk Oblast)
- Coordinates: 57°24′50″N 86°01′48″E
- Country: Russia
- Federal subject: Tomsk Oblast
- Founded: 1953

Population
  - Estimate (2015): 1,997 )
- Time zone: UTC+7 (MSK+4)
- Postal code: 636942
- OKTMO ID: 69648422101

Komsomolsk (Russian: Комсомольск) is a rural locality (a selo) in the Pervomaysky District of Tomsk Oblast, Russia. It is located on the Chulym River.

The population was 1,997 as of 1 January 2015.

Residents earn money in the summer by gathering Siberian cranberries in local forests and swamps.

== Transport ==
The Balagachevo Rail Station is located within the village of Balagachevo within Komsomolsk, and was also previously connected to the nearby Frantsevo via the Komsomol Narrow Gauge Rail, but said rail was demolished by the logging company that owned it as of 2015.
