= Teguldet =

Rural locality in Tomsk Oblast, Russia

Teguldet Тегульдет
- Selo

Other transcription(s)
  - Chulym: Тӧгілдет
- Interactive map of Teguldet
- Location of Teguldet
- Coordinates: 57°18′24″N 88°09′36″E
- Country: Russia
- Federal subject: Tomsk Oblast
- Administrative district: Teguldetsky District

Government
  - Head: Vladimir Semenovich Zhitnik

Population
  - Estimate (2021): 4,154 )
- Time zone: UTC+7 (MSK+4)
- Postal code: 636900
- OKTMO ID: 69652440101

Teguldet (Russian: Тегульдет, Chulym: Тӧгілдет) is a rural locality (a selo) and the administrative center of Teguldetsky District, Tomsk Oblast, Russia. Population: 4,385 (2010 census); 4,787 (2002 census); 5,193 (1989 Soviet census).
