= Krivosheino, Tomsk Oblast =

Rural locality in Tomsk Oblast, Russia

Krivosheino Кривошеино
- Town under district jurisdiction
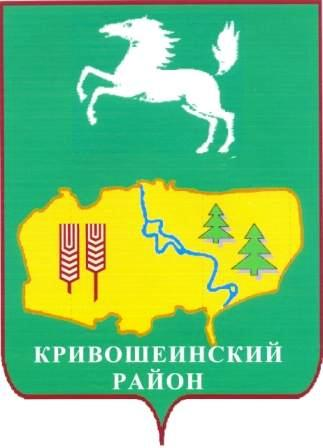
- Coat of arms
- Interactive map of Krivosheino
- Location of Krivosheino Krivosheino (Tomsk Oblast)
- Coordinates: 57°20′31″N 83°55′48″E
- Country: Russia
- Federal subject: Tomsk Oblast
- Administrative district: Krivosheinsky District
- First mentioned: 1826

Population (2010 Census)
  - Total: 5,469
  - Estimate (2021): 5,257

Administrative status
  - Capital of: Krivosheinsky District

Municipal status
  - Municipal district: Krivosheinsky Municipal District
  - Urban settlement: Krivosheinskoye Urban Settlement
  - Capital of: Krivosheinsky Municipal District, Krivosheinskoye Urban Settlement
- Time zone: UTC+7 (MSK+4)
- Postal code: 636300
- OKTMO ID: 69636405101

Krivosheino (Russian: Кривошеино) is a rural locality (a selo) and the administrative center of Krivosheinsky District, Tomsk Oblast, Russia. Population: 5,469 (2010 census); 5,993 (2002 census); 6,825 (1989 Soviet census).

== History ==
In 1926 the settlement had 51 households. After changing the course of the river Brovka by the decision of the Krivosheinsky District Executive Committee and changing the place of its confluence with the Ob river in 1970, active erosion of the left bank of the river and the collapse of the Krivosheinsky ravine began, which caused the destruction of the church building, according to the recollections of residents, in 1972–1973. The Soviet-Jewish dissident, Ida Nudel, was held in Krivosheno at the end of the 70s.
