= Parabelsky District =

Parabelsky District Парабельский район (Russian)
- District
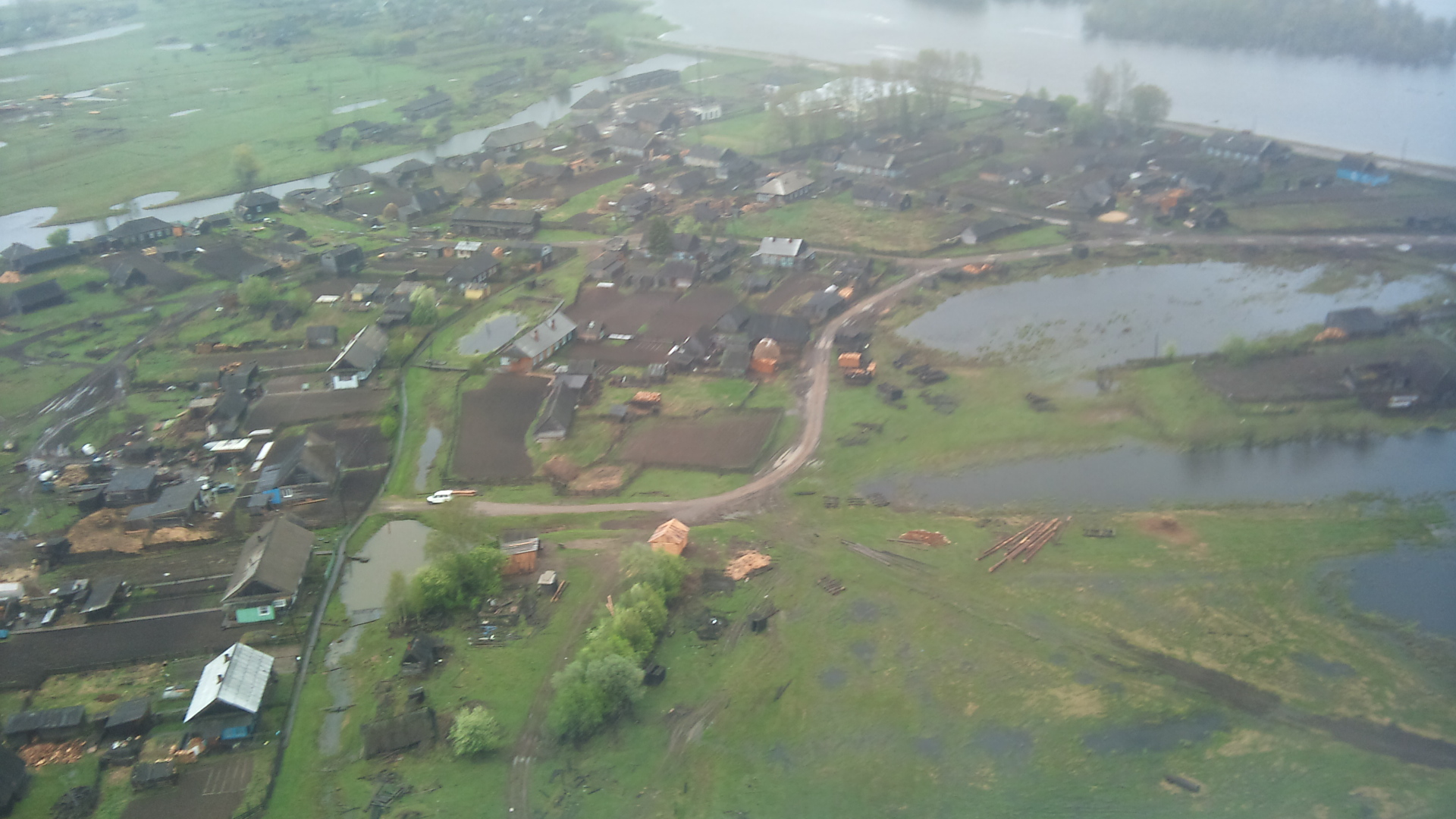
- Narym, in Parabelsky District

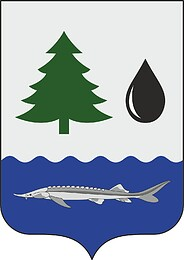
- Coat of arms
- Location of Parabelsky District in Tomsk Oblast
- Coordinates: 57°00′N 86°09′E
- Country: Russia
- Federal subject: Tomsk Oblast
- Established: September 1924
- Administrative center: Parabel

Area
  - Total: 35,845.69 km^{2} (13,840.10 sq mi)

Population (2010 Census)
  - Total: 12,595
  - Density: 0.35137/km^{2} (0.91004/sq mi)
  - Urban: 0%
  - Rural: 100%

Administrative structure
  - Inhabited localities: 34 rural localities

Municipal structure
  - Municipally incorporated as: Parabelsky Municipal District
  - Municipal divisions: 0 urban settlements, 5 rural settlements
- Time zone: UTC+7 (MSK+4)
- OKTMO ID: 69644000
- Website: http://www.parabel.tomsk.ru

Parabelsky District (Russian: Парабе́льский райо́н) is an administrative and municipal district (raion), one of the sixteen in Tomsk Oblast, Russia. It is located in the northern, central, and southwestern parts of the oblast. The area of the district is 35,846.69 square kilometers (13,840.48 sq mi). Its administrative center is the rural locality (a selo) of Parabel. Population: 12,595 (2010 Census); 13,533 (2002 census); 16,033 (1989 Soviet census). The population of Parabel accounts for 48.4% of the district's total population.
