= Chainsky District =

Chainsky District Чаинский район (Russian)
- District
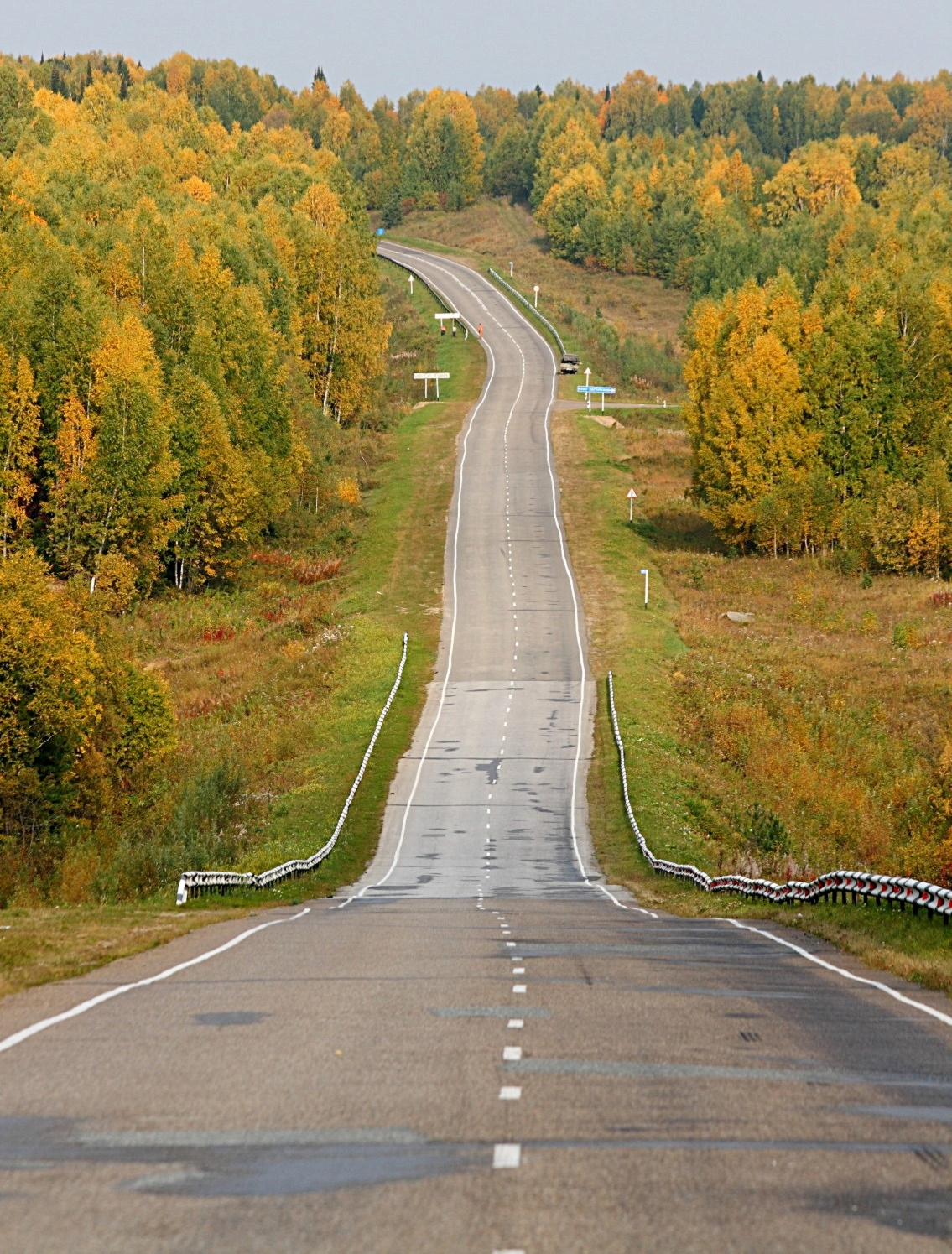
- Route R398, Chainsky District

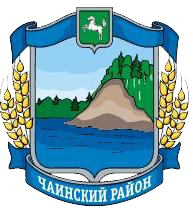
- Coat of arms
- Location of Chainsky District in Tomsk Oblast
- Coordinates: 57°47′N 82°39′E
- Country: Russia
- Federal subject: Tomsk Oblast
- Administrative center: Podgornoye

Area
  - Total: 7,242 km^{2} (2,796 sq mi)

Population (2010 Census)
  - Total: 12,920
  - Density: 1.784/km^{2} (4.621/sq mi)
  - Urban: 0%
  - Rural: 100%

Administrative structure
  - Inhabited localities: 36 rural localities

Municipal structure
  - Municipally incorporated as: Chainsky Municipal District
  - Municipal divisions: 0 urban settlements, 4 rural settlements
- Time zone: UTC+7 (MSK+4)
- OKTMO ID: 69656000
- Website: http://chainsk.tom.ru

Chainsky District (Russian: Ча́инский райо́н) is an administrative and municipal district (raion), one of the sixteen in Tomsk Oblast, Russia. It is located in the center of the oblast. The area of the district is 7,242 square kilometers (2,796 sq mi). Its administrative center is the rural locality (a selo) of Podgornoye. Population: 12,920 (2010 Census); 13,888 (2002 census); 17,325 (1989 Soviet census). The population of Podgornoye accounts for 38.6% of the district's total population.
