= Chulyms =

Turkic ethnic group of Russia

Татарлар

Regions with significant populations
- Russia: Krasnoyarsk Krai; Tomsk Oblast: 382

Languages
- Chulym, Russian

Religion
- Russian Orthodox, and Shamanism

Related ethnic groups
- Siberian Tatars, Khakas, Fuyu Kyrgyz, Shors, Chelkans, Kumandins, Tubalars

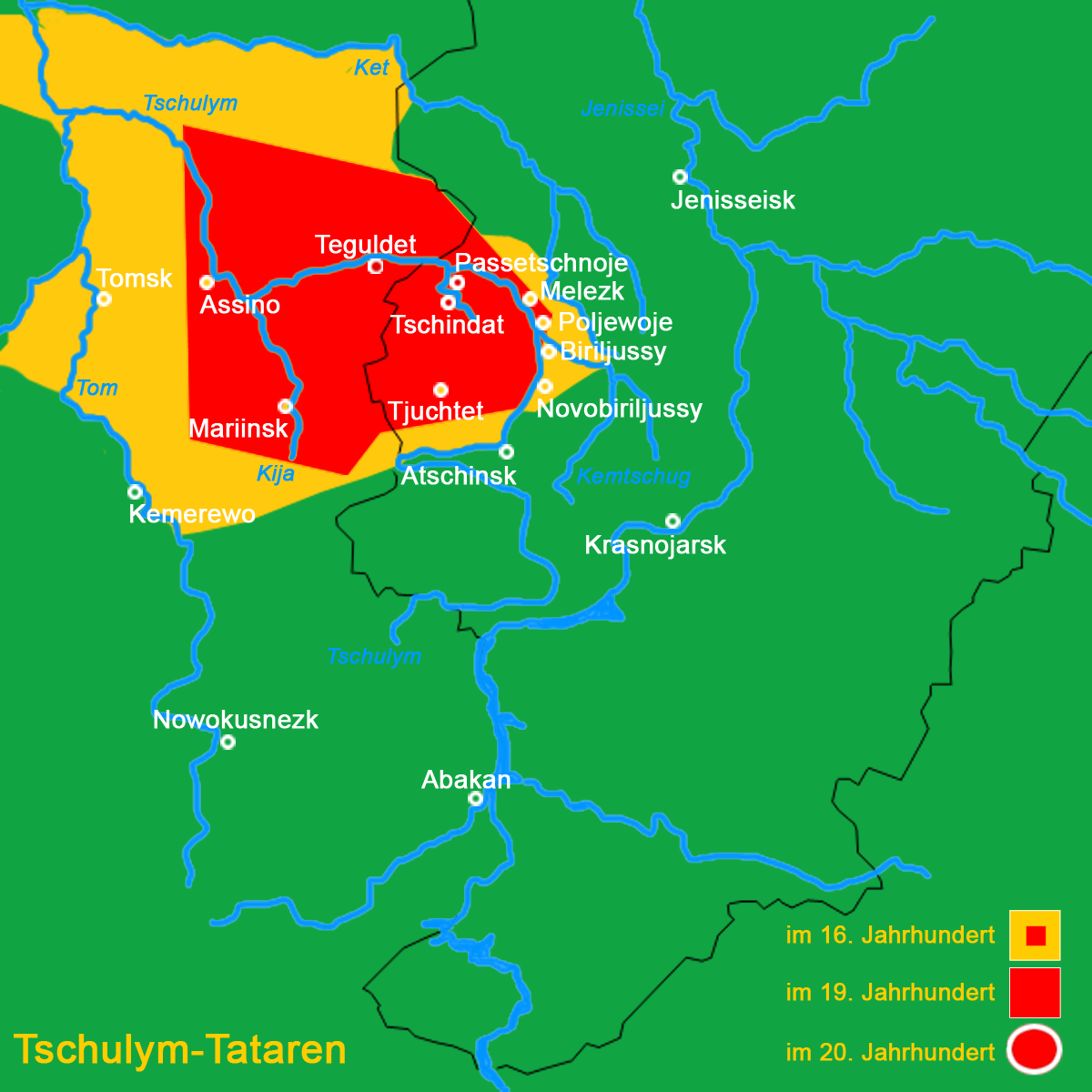
Distribution of Chulyms in 16th, 19th and 20th centuries

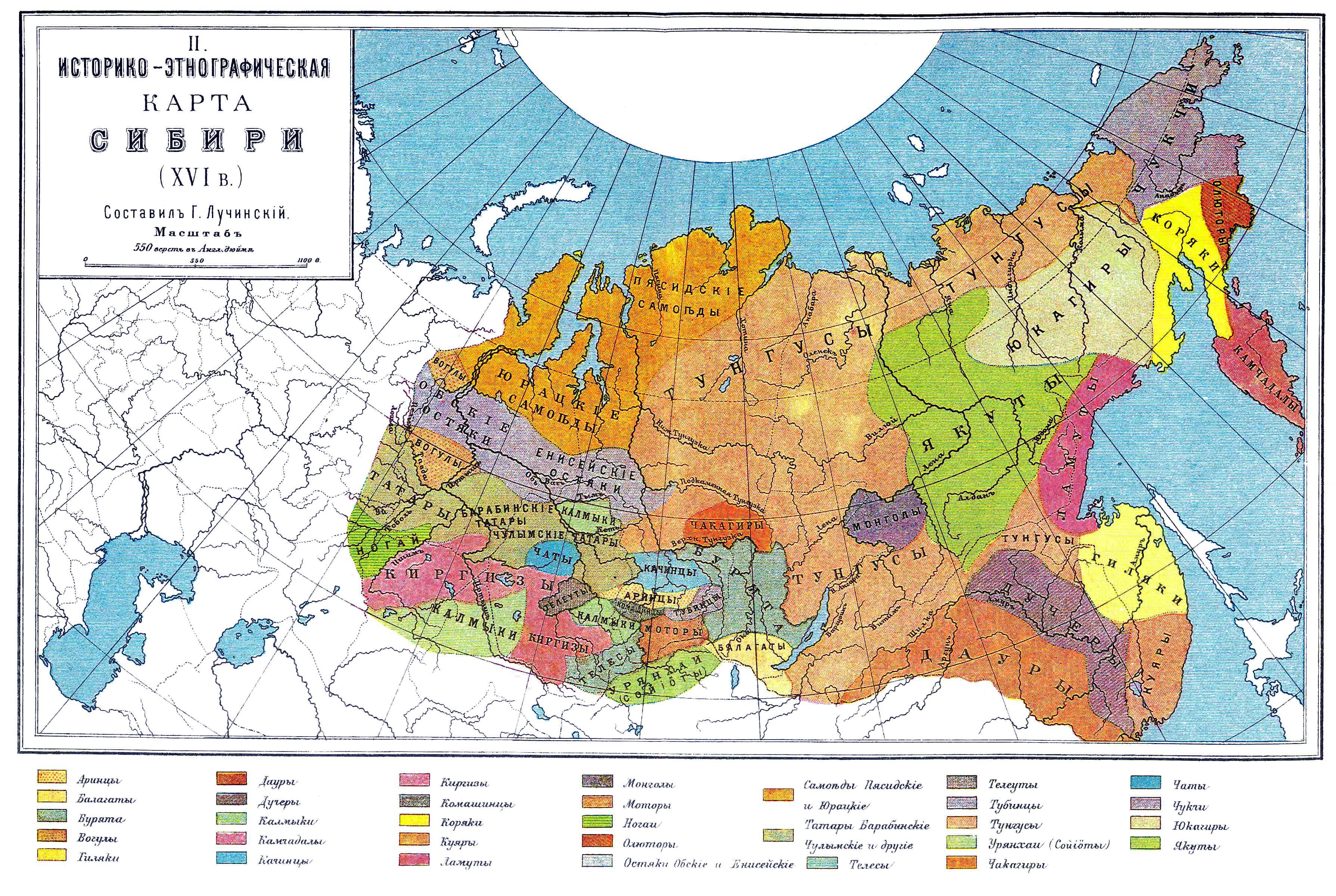
Peoples of Siberia in the 16th century.

The Chulyms, Chulym Tatars or Tom Karagas (Chulym: Татарлар, Tatarlar) are a Turkic people in the Tomsk Oblast and Krasnoyarsk Krai in Russia. In 2021, there were 382 Chulyms in Russia.

== History ==
The Chulym Tatars first came to the Chulym River when they were driven from their homes in the Sibir Khanate by the forces of Ermak Timofeevich. They used to live along the middle and lower reaches of the Chulym River (tributary of the Ob River). They call themselves the Chulymian Tatars. The Chulyms appeared in the 16th century as a result of mixing of some of the Turkic groups, who had migrated to the East after the fall of the Khanate of Sibir, partially Teleuts, Yenisei Kyrgyz and groups of Siberian Tatars.

During the 16th century, the Russians conquered the Chulyms and their newly settled land. In 1720, the Chulyms were forcefully converted to Christianity. In the early 19th century, the Chulyms were mandated by an edict from the Russian authorities to increase their productivity which further disenfranchised them as they were already burdened with heavy taxation. Under Soviet rule, the Chulyms were collectivized and forced to adopt a sedentary lifestyle. The ideologies of the Soviet government were also imposed upon the Chulyms and their culture. Most of the Chulyms' descendants blended with the Khakas and Russians.

== Culture ==
Chulyms speak Chulym and adhere to a syncretic form of Russian Orthodoxy and Shamanism.

The Chulyms were originally hunters and trappers. However, modernization has changed their livelihood and they mainly work in factories, tanneries and sawmills.

== See also ==
- Siberian Tatars
- Turkic peoples of Siberia
