= Parabel (rural locality) =

Rural locality in Tomsk Oblast, Russia

Coordinates: 58°42′48″N 81°29′57″E

Parabel (Russian: Парабель, Narym Selkup: Варӷ кара́) is a rural locality (a selo) and the administrative center of Parabelsky District, Tomsk Oblast, Russia. Population: 6,096 (2010 census); 6,209 (2002 census); 6,944 (1989 Soviet census).
