= Krivosheinsky District =

Krivosheinsky District Кривошеинский район (Russian)
- District
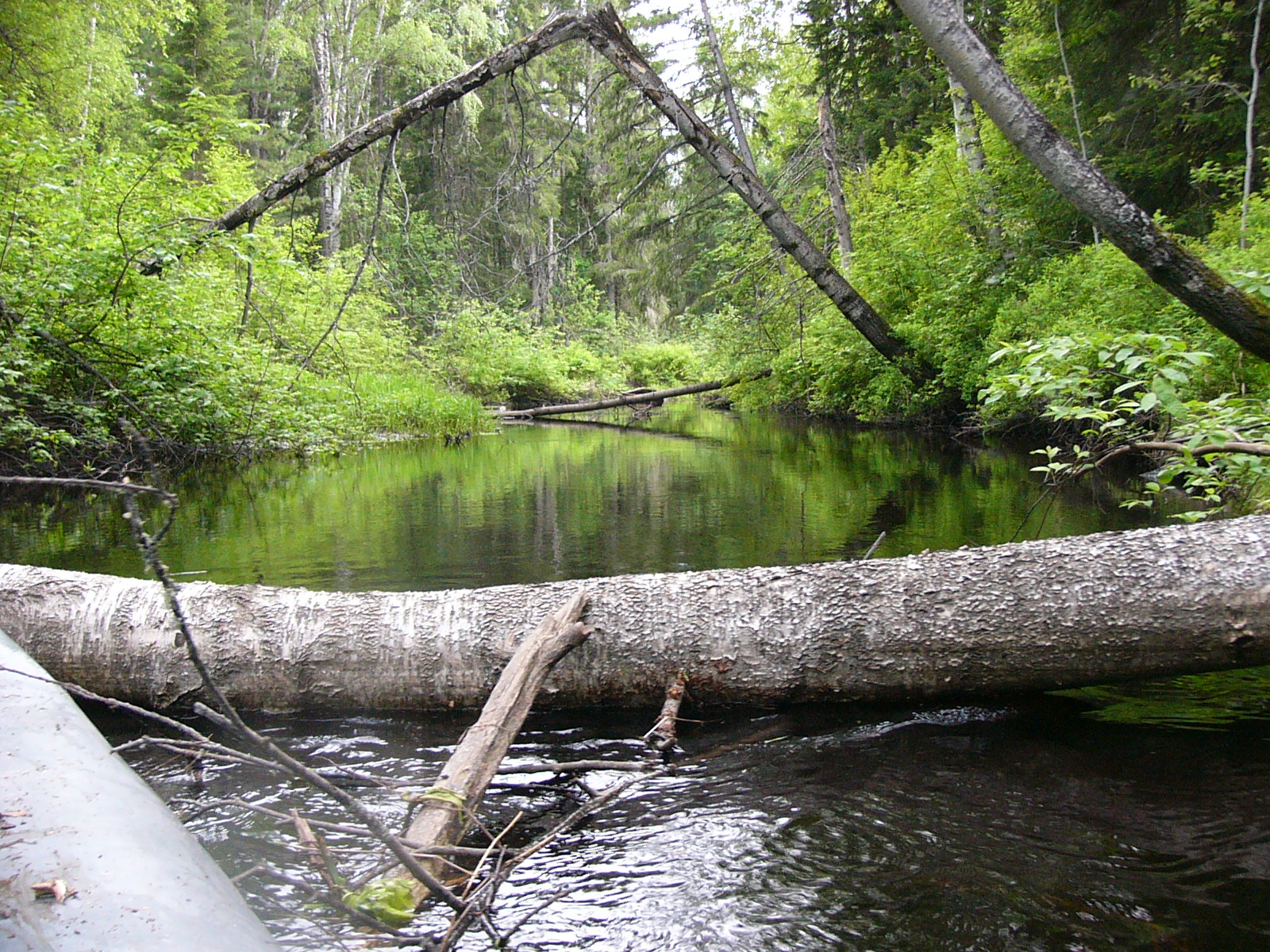
- Tatosh, Krivosheinsky District

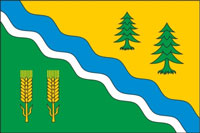
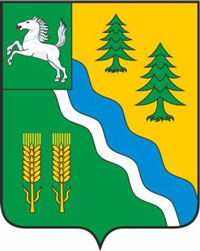
- Flag Coat of arms
- Location of Krivosheinsky District in Tomsk Oblast
- Coordinates: 57°21′N 83°56′E
- Country: Russia
- Federal subject: Tomsk Oblast
- Administrative center: Krivosheino

Area
  - Total: 4,380 km^{2} (1,690 sq mi)

Population (2010 Census)
  - Total: 13,285
  - Density: 3.03/km^{2} (7.86/sq mi)
  - Urban: 0%
  - Rural: 100%

Administrative structure
  - Inhabited localities: 22 rural localities

Municipal structure
  - Municipally incorporated as: Krivosheinsky Municipal District
  - Municipal divisions: 0 urban settlements, 7 rural settlements
- Time zone: UTC+7 (MSK+4)
- OKTMO ID: 69636000
- Website: http://kradm.tomsk.ru/

Krivosheinsky District (Russian: Кривоше́инский райо́н) is an administrative and municipal district (raion), one of the sixteen in Tomsk Oblast, Russia. It is located in the southeastern central part of the oblast. The area of the district is 4,380 square kilometers (1,690 sq mi). Its administrative center is the rural locality (a selo) of Krivosheino. Population: 13,285 (2010 Census); 15,848 (2002 census); 19,332 (1989 Soviet census). The population of Krivosheino accounts for 41.2% of the district's total population.
