= Kargasok =

Administrative center of Kargasoksky District, Tomsk Oblast, Russia

Coordinates: 59°04′N 80°52′E

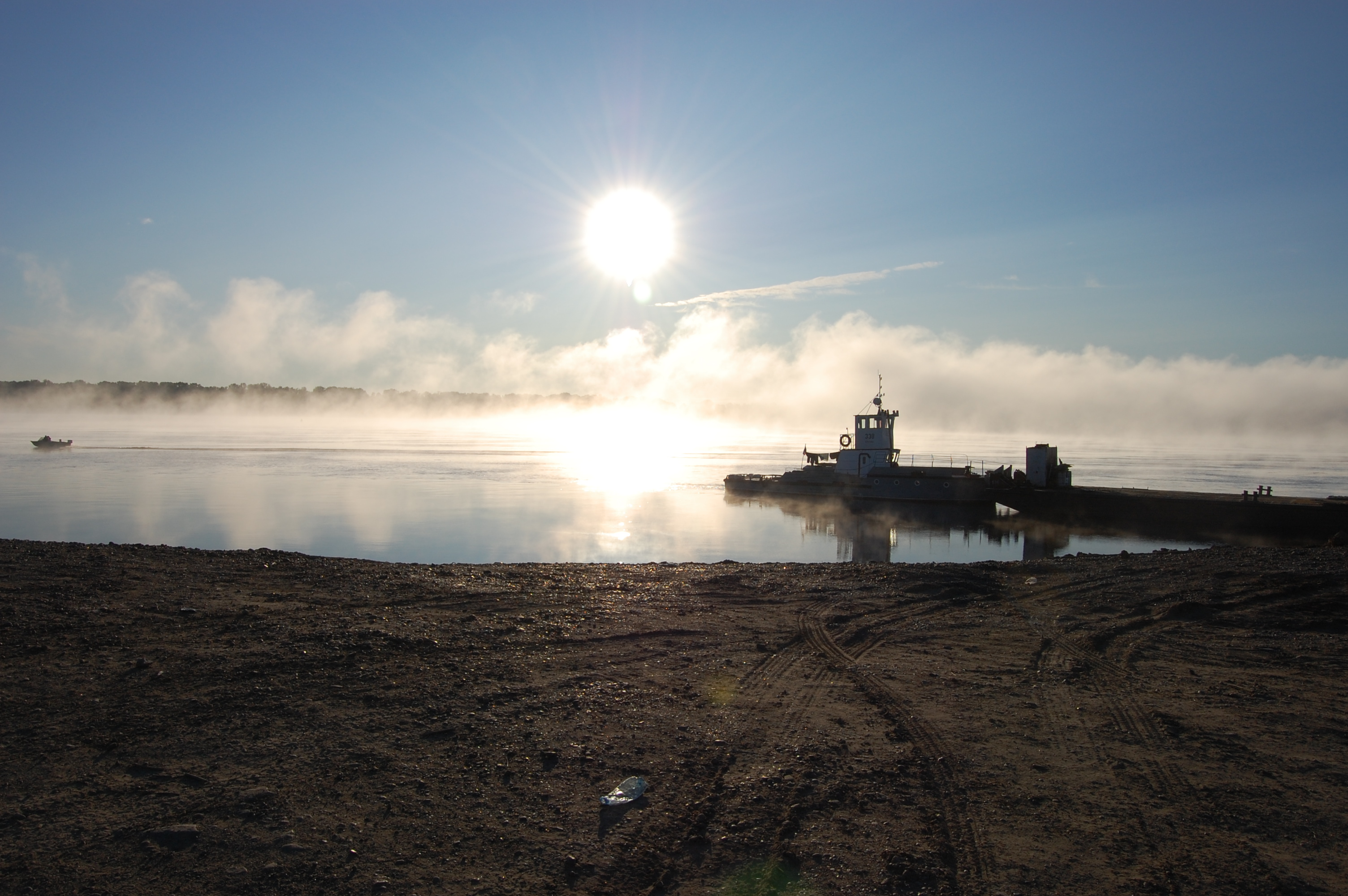
Sunrise over Ob River at the landing beach at Kargasok

Kargasok (Russian: Каргасок, Narym Selkup: Ӄорӷытсоӄ) is a rural locality (a selo) and the administrative center of Kargasoksky District of Tomsk Oblast, Russia, located on the left bank of the Ob River, 460 kilometers (290 mi) from Tomsk, the administrative center of the oblast. Population: 8,127 (2010 census); 8,547 (2002 census); 8,450 (1989 Soviet census).

== Etymology ==
Its name means the bear cape in Selkup.

== History ==
It was first mentioned in 1640. Originally, it was located on the left bank of the Panigadka River, but after the intense deforestation, the Panigadka became too shallow for large ships to approach, prompting Kargasok's move to its present location.
