= Kargasoksky District =

Kargasoksky District Каргасокский район (Russian)
- District
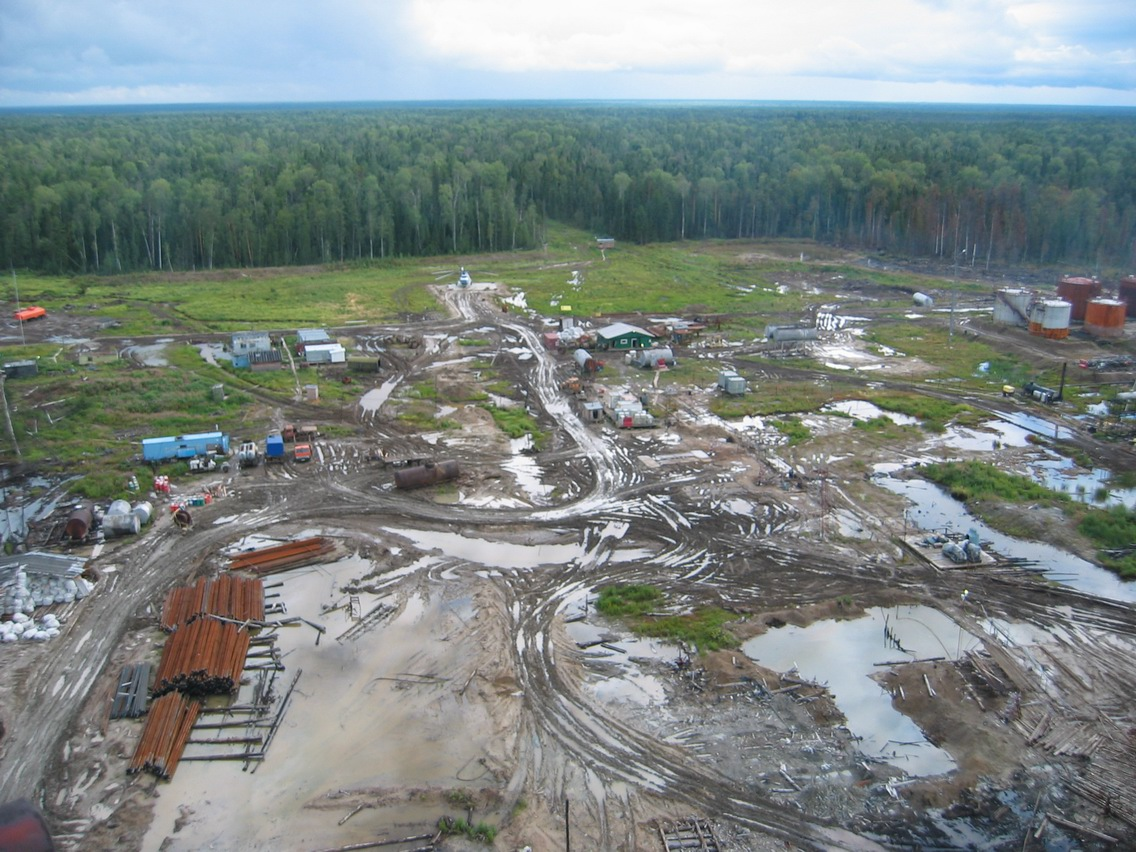
- Oil extraction in Kargasoksky District

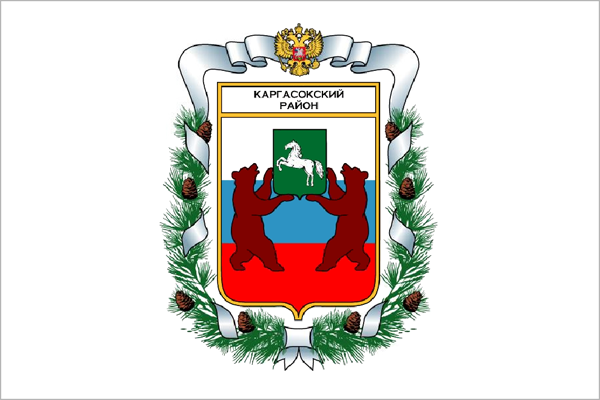
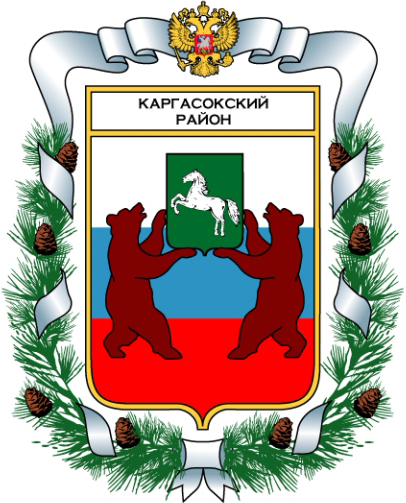
- Flag Coat of arms
- Location of Kargasoksky District in Tomsk Oblast
- Coordinates: 59°03′28″N 80°52′16″E
- Country: Russia
- Federal subject: Tomsk Oblast
- Established: 1959
- Administrative center: Kargasok

Area
  - Total: 86,900 km^{2} (33,600 sq mi)

Population (2010 Census)
  - Total: 21,814
  - Density: 0.251/km^{2} (0.650/sq mi)
  - Urban: 0%
  - Rural: 100%

Administrative structure
  - Inhabited localities: 31 rural localities

Municipal structure
  - Municipally incorporated as: Kargasoksky Municipal District
  - Municipal divisions: 0 urban settlements, 12 rural settlements
- Time zone: UTC+7 (MSK+4)
- OKTMO ID: 69624000
- Website: http://www.kargasok.ru/

Kargasoksky District (Russian: Каргасо́кский райо́н) is an administrative and municipal district (raion), one of the sixteen in Tomsk Oblast, Russia. It is located in the oblast's northern, western, and southwestern parts. The area of the district is 86,900 square kilometers (33,600 sq mi). Its administrative center is the rural locality (a selo) of Kargasok. Population: 21,814 (2010 Census); 24,756 (2002 census); 28,651 (1989 Soviet census). The population of Kargasok accounts for 37.3% of the district's total population.

== Geography ==
At 86,900 square kilometers (33,600 sq mi), it is the largest district by area in Tomsk Oblast, accounting for over a quarter of its total territory.

== History ==
In its present form, the district has existed since 1959.

== Demographics ==
95.7% of the population are ethnic Russians. Selkups at 2.1% and Khanty people at 0.6% represent the minorities.

== Economy ==
Natural resources include oil, peat and clay, sand. The district produces 60% of oil and all of the natural gas in Tomsk Oblast. 2008 oil production was at 7.4 million tons.
