= Kamenka, Russia =

Kamenka (Russian: Ка́менка) is the name of several inhabited localities in Russia.

== Modern localities ==
=== Altai Krai ===
As of 2012, three rural localities in Altai Krai bear this name:

- Kamenka, Krasnogorsky District, Altai Krai, a settlement in Souskanikhinsky Selsoviet of Krasnogorsky District; 52°37′N 86°1′E
- Kamenka, Kuryinsky District, Altai Krai, a settlement in Kazantsevsky Selsoviet of Kuryinsky District; 51°19′N 82°23′E
- Kamenka, Kytmanovsky District, Altai Krai, a selo in Semeno-Krasilovsky Selsoviet of Kytmanovsky District; 53°32′N 85°43′E

=== Amur Oblast ===
As of 2012, two rural localities in Amur Oblast bear this name:

- Kamenka, Arkharinsky District, Amur Oblast, a selo in Chernigovsky Rural Settlement of Arkharinsky District
- Kamenka, Mazanovsky District, Amur Oblast, a selo in Beloyarovsky Rural Settlement of Mazanovsky District

=== Arkhangelsk Oblast ===
As of 2012, two rural localities in Arkhangelsk Oblast bear this name:

- Kamenka, Kotlassky District, Arkhangelsk Oblast, a village in Koryazhemsky Selsoviet of Kotlassky District
- Kamenka, Mezensky District, Arkhangelsk Oblast, a settlement in Mezensky District

=== Republic of Bashkortostan ===
As of 2012, three rural localities in the Republic of Bashkortostan bear this name:

- Kamenka, Alsheyevsky District, Republic of Bashkortostan, a village in Chebenlinsky Selsoviet of Alsheyevsky District
- Kamenka, Aurgazinsky District, Republic of Bashkortostan, a village in Meselinsky Selsoviet of Aurgazinsky District
- Kamenka, Bizhbulyaksky District, Republic of Bashkortostan, a selo in Kamensky Selsoviet of Bizhbulyaksky District

=== Belgorod Oblast ===
As of 2012, one rural locality in Belgorod Oblast bears this name:

- Kamenka, Belgorod Oblast, a selo in Novoukolovsky Rural Okrug of Krasnensky District

=== Bryansk Oblast ===
As of 2012, three rural localities in Bryansk Oblast bear this name:

- Kamenka, Brasovsky District, Bryansk Oblast, a settlement under the administrative jurisdiction of Lokotskoy Settlement Administrative Okrug in Brasovsky District; 52°30′N 34°31′E
- Kamenka, Klimovsky District, Bryansk Oblast, a selo in Plavensky Rural Administrative Okrug of Klimovsky District; 52°28′N 32°22′E
- Kamenka, Krasnogorsky District, Bryansk Oblast, a settlement in Kolyudovsky Rural Administrative Okrug of Krasnogorsky District; 53°5′N 31°30′E

=== Chelyabinsk Oblast ===
As of 2012, two rural localities in Chelyabinsk Oblast bear this name:

- Kamenka, Kizilsky District, Chelyabinsk Oblast, a settlement in Bogdanovsky Selsoviet of Kizilsky District
- Kamenka, Troitsky District, Chelyabinsk Oblast, a settlement in Kosobrodsky Selsoviet of Troitsky District

=== Irkutsk Oblast ===
As of 2012, three rural localities in Irkutsk Oblast bear this name:

- Kamenka, Nizhneudinsky District, Irkutsk Oblast, a selo in Nizhneudinsky District
- Kamenka, Bayandayevsky District, Irkutsk Oblast, a settlement in Bayandayevsky District
- Kamenka, Bokhansky District, Irkutsk Oblast, a selo in Bokhansky District

=== Ivanovo Oblast ===
As of 2012, one urban locality in Ivanovo Oblast bears this name:

- Kamenka, Ivanovo Oblast, a settlement in Vichugsky District

=== Kabardino-Balkarian Republic ===
As of 2012, one rural locality in the Kabardino-Balkarian Republic bears this name:

- Kamenka, Kabardino-Balkarian Republic, a selo in Chegemsky District; 43°33′N 43°31′E

=== Kaliningrad Oblast ===
As of 2012, five rural localities in Kaliningrad Oblast bear this name:

- Kamenka, Bagrationovsky District, Kaliningrad Oblast, a settlement in Dolgorukovsky Rural Okrug of Bagrationovsky District
- Kamenka, Guryevsky District, Kaliningrad Oblast, a settlement in Lugovskoy Rural Okrug of Guryevsky District
- Kamenka, Polessky District, Kaliningrad Oblast, a settlement in Turgenevsky Rural Okrug of Polessky District
- Kamenka, Pravdinsky District, Kaliningrad Oblast, a settlement under the administrative jurisdiction of the urban-type settlement of district significance of Zheleznodorozhny in Pravdinsky District
- Kamenka, Zelenogradsky District, Kaliningrad Oblast, a settlement in Kovrovsky Rural Okrug of Zelenogradsky District

=== Kaluga Oblast ===
As of 2012, nine rural localities in Kaluga Oblast bear this name:

- Kamenka (Asmolovo Rural Settlement), Baryatinsky District, Kaluga Oblast, a village in Baryatinsky District; municipally, a part of Asmolovo Rural Settlement of that district
- Kamenka (Bakhmutovo Rural Settlement), Baryatinsky District, Kaluga Oblast, a village in Baryatinsky District; municipally, a part of Bakhmutovo Rural Settlement of that district
- Kamenka, Duminichsky District, Kaluga Oblast, a village in Duminichsky District
- Kamenka (selo Ferzikovo Rural Settlement), Ferzikovsky District, Kaluga Oblast, a village in Ferzikovsky District; municipally, a part of selo Ferzikovo Rural Settlement of that district
- Kamenka (Sugonovo Rural Settlement), Ferzikovsky District, Kaluga Oblast, a village in Ferzikovsky District; municipally, a part of Sugonovo Rural Settlement of that district
- Kamenka, Kozelsky District, Kaluga Oblast, a village in Kozelsky District
- Kamenka, Meshchovsky District, Kaluga Oblast, a village in Meshchovsky District
- Kamenka, Mosalsky District, Kaluga Oblast, a village in Mosalsky District
- Kamenka, Zhizdrinsky District, Kaluga Oblast, a village in Zhizdrinsky District

=== Kemerovo Oblast ===
As of 2012, two rural localities in Kemerovo Oblast bear this name:

- Kamenka, Krapivinsky District, Kemerovo Oblast, a selo in Kamenskaya Rural Territory of Krapivinsky District; 54°48′N 86°43′E
- Kamenka, Promyshlennovsky District, Kemerovo Oblast, a village in Pushkinskaya Rural Territory of Promyshlennovsky District; 54°50′N 85°33′E

=== Khabarovsk Krai ===
As of 2012, one rural locality in Khabarovsk Krai bears this name:

- Kamenka, Khabarovsk Krai, a hydrologic post in imeni Poliny Osipenko District

=== Kostroma Oblast ===
As of 2012, three rural localities in Kostroma Oblast bear this name:

- Kamenka, Buysky District, Kostroma Oblast, a village in Tsentralnoye Settlement of Buysky District; 58°39′N 42°5′E
- Kamenka, Nerekhtsky District, Kostroma Oblast, a village in Voskresenskoye Settlement of Nerekhtsky District; 57°27′N 40°37′E
- Kamenka, Vokhomsky District, Kostroma Oblast, a village in Belkovskoye Settlement of Vokhomsky District; 58°59′N 46°28′E

=== Krasnoyarsk Krai ===
As of 2012, four rural localities in Krasnoyarsk Krai bear this name:

- Kamenka, Abansky District, Krasnoyarsk Krai, a village in Apano-Klyuchinsky Selsoviet of Abansky District
- Kamenka, Achinsky District, Krasnoyarsk Krai, a village in Klyuchinsky Selsoviet of Achinsky District
- Kamenka, Boguchansky District, Krasnoyarsk Krai, a village in Boguchansky District
- Kamenka, Irbeysky District, Krasnoyarsk Krai, a village in Ust-Yarulsky Selsoviet of Irbeysky District

=== Kursk Oblast ===
As of 2012, four rural localities in Kursk Oblast bear this name:

- Kamenka, Dmitriyevsky District, Kursk Oblast, a settlement in Paltsevsky Selsoviet of Dmitriyevsky District
- Kamenka, Gorshechensky District, Kursk Oblast, a village in Znamensky Selsoviet of Gorshechensky District
- Kamenka, Oboyansky District, Kursk Oblast, a selo in Kamensky Selsoviet of Oboyansky District
- Kamenka, Zolotukhinsky District, Kursk Oblast, a khutor in Belokolodezsky Selsoviet of Zolotukhinsky District

=== Leningrad Oblast ===
As of 2012, seven rural localities in Leningrad Oblast bear this name:

- Kamenka, Luzhsky District, Leningrad Oblast, a village in Zaklinskoye Settlement Municipal Formation of Luzhsky District; 58°49′N 30°6′E
- Kamenka, Slantsevsky District, Leningrad Oblast, a village under the administrative jurisdiction of Slantsevskoye Settlement Municipal Formation in Slantsevsky District; 59°9′N 28°2′E
- Kamenka, Tosnensky District, Leningrad Oblast, a village in Lisinskoye Settlement Municipal Formation of Tosnensky District; 59°18′N 30°44′E
- Kamenka, Berezhkovskoye Settlement Municipal Formation, Volkhovsky District, Leningrad Oblast, a village in Berezhkovskoye Settlement Municipal Formation of Volkhovsky District; 59°43′N 32°20′E
- Kamenka, Kolchanovskoye Settlement Municipal Formation, Volkhovsky District, Leningrad Oblast, a village in Kolchanovskoye Settlement Municipal Formation of Volkhovsky District; 60°1′N 32°49′E
- Kamenka, Vsevolozhsky District, Leningrad Oblast, a village in Shcheglovskoye Settlement Municipal Formation of Vsevolozhsky District; 59°59′N 30°53′E
- Kamenka, Vyborgsky District, Leningrad Oblast, a settlement in Polyanskoye Settlement Municipal Formation of Vyborgsky District; 60°27′N 29°5′E

=== Lipetsk Oblast ===
As of 2012, six rural localities in Lipetsk Oblast bear this name:

- Kamenka, Dankovsky District, Lipetsk Oblast, a village in Yagodnovsky Selsoviet of Dankovsky District; 53°21′N 39°20′E
- Kamenka, Dolgorukovsky District, Lipetsk Oblast, a village in Veselovsky Selsoviet of Dolgorukovsky District; 52°21′N 38°7′E
- Kamenka, Izmalkovsky District, Lipetsk Oblast, a village in Petrovsky Selsoviet of Izmalkovsky District; 52°37′N 38°6′E
- Kamenka, Krasninsky District, Lipetsk Oblast, a village in Krasninsky Selsoviet of Krasninsky District; 52°54′N 38°50′E
- Kamenka, Terbunsky District, Lipetsk Oblast, a selo in Ozersky Selsoviet of Terbunsky District; 52°7′N 38°46′E
- Kamenka, Zadonsky District, Lipetsk Oblast, a selo in Kamensky Selsoviet of Zadonsky District; 52°23′N 38°46′E

=== Republic of Mordovia ===
As of 2012, four rural localities in the Republic of Mordovia bear this name:

- Kamenka, Atyashevsky District, Republic of Mordovia, a selo in Kamensky Selsoviet of Atyashevsky District; 54°43′N 45°59′E
- Kamenka, Atyuryevsky District, Republic of Mordovia, a selo in Kamensky Selsoviet of Atyuryevsky District; 54°17′N 43°19′E
- Kamenka, Chamzinsky District, Republic of Mordovia, a village in Sabur-Machkassky Selsoviet of Chamzinsky District; 54°30′N 45°51′E
- Kamenka, Romodanovsky District, Republic of Mordovia, a village in Konstantinovsky Selsoviet of Romodanovsky District; 54°27′N 45°23′E

=== Moscow ===
As of 2012, two rural localities in Troitsky Administrative Okrug of the federal city of Moscow bear this name:

- Kamenka, Rogovskoye Settlement, Troitsky Administrative Okrug, Moscow, a village in Rogovskoye Settlement
- Kamenka, Pervomayskoye Settlement, Troitsky Administrative Okrug, Moscow, a village in Pervomayskoye Settlement

=== Moscow Oblast ===
As of 2012, eleven rural localities in Moscow Oblast bear this name:

- Kamenka, Dmitrovsky District, Moscow Oblast, a village in Gabovskoye Rural Settlement of Dmitrovsky District
- Kamenka, Kashirsky District, Moscow Oblast, a village in Domninskoye Rural Settlement of Kashirsky District
- Kamenka, Khoroshovskoye Rural Settlement, Kolomensky District, Moscow Oblast, a village in Khoroshovskoye Rural Settlement of Kolomensky District
- Kamenka, Provodnikovskoye Rural Settlement, Kolomensky District, Moscow Oblast, a village in Provodnikovskoye Rural Settlement of Kolomensky District
- Kamenka, Mozhaysky District, Moscow Oblast, a village in Poretskoye Rural Settlement of Mozhaysky District
- Kamenka, Naro-Fominsky District, Moscow Oblast, a village under the administrative jurisdiction of the Town of Vereya in Naro-Fominsky District
- Kamenka, Ozyorsky District, Moscow Oblast, a village in Boyarkinskoye Rural Settlement of Ozyorsky District
- Kamenka, Serpukhovsky District, Moscow Oblast, a village in Vasilyevskoye Rural Settlement of Serpukhovsky District
- Kamenka, Aksinyinskoye Rural Settlement, Stupinsky District, Moscow Oblast, a village in Aksinyinskoye Rural Settlement of Stupinsky District
- Kamenka, Malino, Stupinsky District, Moscow Oblast, a village under the administrative jurisdiction of Malino Work Settlement in Stupinsky District
- Kamenka, Stupino, Stupinsky District, Moscow Oblast, a village under the administrative jurisdiction of the Town of Stupino in Stupinsky District

=== Nenets Autonomous Okrug ===
As of 2012, one rural locality in Nenets Autonomous Okrug bears this name:

- Kamenka, Nenets Autonomous Okrug, a village in Pustozersky Selsoviet of Zapolyarny District

=== Nizhny Novgorod Oblast ===
As of 2012, eleven rural localities in Nizhny Novgorod Oblast bear this name:

- Kamenka, Arzamassky District, Nizhny Novgorod Oblast, a selo in Abramovsky Selsoviet of Arzamassky District
- Kamenka, Kstovsky District, Nizhny Novgorod Oblast, a village in Chernukhinsky Selsoviet of Kstovsky District
- Kamenka, Lyskovsky District, Nizhny Novgorod Oblast, a selo in Berendeyevsky Selsoviet of Lyskovsky District
- Kamenka, Perevozsky District, Nizhny Novgorod Oblast, a village in Paletsky Selsoviet of Perevozsky District
- Kamenka, Pilninsky District, Nizhny Novgorod Oblast, a selo in Medyansky Selsoviet of Pilninsky District
- Kamenka, Pelya-Khovansky Selsoviet, Pochinkovsky District, Nizhny Novgorod Oblast, a village in Pelya-Khovansky Selsoviet of Pochinkovsky District
- Kamenka, Rizovatovsky Selsoviet, Pochinkovsky District, Nizhny Novgorod Oblast, a settlement in Rizovatovsky Selsoviet of Pochinkovsky District
- Kamenka, Sergachsky District, Nizhny Novgorod Oblast, a village in Staroberezovsky Selsoviet of Sergachsky District
- Kamenka, Vetluzhsky District, Nizhny Novgorod Oblast, a village in Kruttsovsky Selsoviet of Vetluzhsky District
- Kamenka, Vorotynsky District, Nizhny Novgorod Oblast, a selo in Kamensky Selsoviet of Vorotynsky District
- Kamenka, Voskresensky District, Nizhny Novgorod Oblast, a village in Vladimirsky Selsoviet of Voskresensky District

=== Novgorod Oblast ===
As of 2012, fourteen rural localities in Novgorod Oblast bear this name:

- Kamenka, Pesotskoye Settlement, Demyansky District, Novgorod Oblast, a village in Pesotskoye Settlement of Demyansky District
- Kamenka, Zhirkovskoye Settlement, Demyansky District, Novgorod Oblast, a village in Zhirkovskoye Settlement of Demyansky District
- Kamenka, Krasnoborskoye Settlement, Kholmsky District, Novgorod Oblast, a village in Krasnoborskoye Settlement of Kholmsky District
- Kamenka, Togodskoye Settlement, Kholmsky District, Novgorod Oblast, a village in Togodskoye Settlement of Kholmsky District
- Kamenka, Khvoyninsky District, Novgorod Oblast, a village in Ostakhnovskoye Settlement of Khvoyninsky District
- Kamenka, Novorakhinskoye Settlement, Krestetsky District, Novgorod Oblast, a village in Novorakhinskoye Settlement of Krestetsky District
- Kamenka, Zaytsevskoye Settlement, Krestetsky District, Novgorod Oblast, a village in Zaytsevskoye Settlement of Krestetsky District
- Kamenka, Lyubytinsky District, Novgorod Oblast, a village under the administrative jurisdiction of the settlement of Lyubytinskoye in Lyubytinsky District
- Kamenka, Malovishersky District, Novgorod Oblast, a village in Burginskoye Settlement of Malovishersky District
- Kamenka, Pestovsky District, Novgorod Oblast, a village in Pestovskoye Settlement of Pestovsky District
- Kamenka, Poddorsky District, Novgorod Oblast, a village in Belebelkovskoye Settlement of Poddorsky District
- Kamenka, Dubrovskoye Settlement, Soletsky District, Novgorod Oblast, a village in Dubrovskoye Settlement of Soletsky District
- Kamenka, Gorskoye Settlement, Soletsky District, Novgorod Oblast, a village in Gorskoye Settlement of Soletsky District
- Kamenka, Starorussky District, Novgorod Oblast, a village in Novoselskoye Settlement of Starorussky District

=== Novosibirsk Oblast ===
As of 2012, four rural localities in Novosibirsk Oblast bear this name:

- Kamenka, Iskitimsky District, Novosibirsk Oblast, a settlement in Iskitimsky District
- Kamenka, Moshkovsky District, Novosibirsk Oblast, a settlement in Moshkovsky District
- Kamenka, Novosibirsky District, Novosibirsk Oblast, a selo in Novosibirsky District
- Kamenka, Ubinsky District, Novosibirsk Oblast, a village in Ubinsky District

=== Omsk Oblast ===
As of 2012, one rural locality in Omsk Oblast bears this name:

- Kamenka, Omsk Oblast, a village in Yeremeyevsky Rural Okrug of Poltavsky District

=== Orenburg Oblast ===
As of 2012, five rural localities in Orenburg Oblast bear this name:

- Kamenka, Alexandrovsky District, Orenburg Oblast, a selo in Zhdanovsky Selsoviet of Alexandrovsky District
- Kamenka, Grachyovsky District, Orenburg Oblast, a selo in Grachevsky Selsoviet of Grachyovsky District
- Kamenka, Oktyabrsky District, Orenburg Oblast, a selo in Maryevsky Selsoviet of Oktyabrsky District
- Kamenka, Sakmarsky District, Orenburg Oblast, a selo in Kamensky Selsoviet of Sakmarsky District
- Kamenka, Sorochinsky District, Orenburg Oblast, a selo in Mikhaylovsky Vtoroy Selsoviet of Sorochinsky District

=== Oryol Oblast ===
As of 2012, twelve rural localities in Oryol Oblast bear this name:

- Kamenka, Bolkhovsky District, Oryol Oblast, a settlement in Novosinetsky Selsoviet of Bolkhovsky District
- Kamenka, Glazunovsky District, Oryol Oblast, a village in Medvedevsky Selsoviet of Glazunovsky District
- Kamenka, Krasnozorensky District, Oryol Oblast, a village in Krasnozorensky Selsoviet of Krasnozorensky District
- Kamenka, Leninsky Selsoviet, Maloarkhangelsky District, Oryol Oblast, a village in Leninsky Selsoviet of Maloarkhangelsky District
- Kamenka, Lukovsky Selsoviet, Maloarkhangelsky District, Oryol Oblast, a village in Lukovsky Selsoviet of Maloarkhangelsky District
- Kamenka, Mtsensky District, Oryol Oblast, a village in Bashkatovsky Selsoviet of Mtsensky District
- Kamenka, Orlovsky District, Oryol Oblast, a selo in Zhilyayevsky Selsoviet of Orlovsky District
- Kamenka, Pokrovsky District, Oryol Oblast, a village in Mokhovskoy Selsoviet of Pokrovsky District
- Kamenka, Russko-Brodsky Selsoviet, Verkhovsky District, Oryol Oblast, a village in Russko-Brodsky Selsoviet of Verkhovsky District
- Kamenka, Turovsky Selsoviet, Verkhovsky District, Oryol Oblast, a selo in Turovsky Selsoviet of Verkhovsky District
- Kamenka, Zalegoshchensky District, Oryol Oblast, a village in Lomovsky Selsoviet of Zalegoshchensky District
- Kamenka, Znamensky District, Oryol Oblast, a village in Koptevsky Selsoviet of Znamensky District

=== Penza Oblast ===
As of 2012, five inhabited localities in Penza Oblast bear this name:

Urban localities

- Kamenka, Kamensky District, Penza Oblast, a town in Kamensky District

Rural localities

- Kamenka, Bashmakovsky District, Penza Oblast, a selo in Boyarovsky Selsoviet of Bashmakovsky District
- Kamenka, Kuznetsky District, Penza Oblast, a selo in Yasnopolyansky Selsoviet of Kuznetsky District
- Kamenka, Tamalinsky District, Penza Oblast, a selo in Ulyanovsky Selsoviet of Tamalinsky District
- Kamenka, Vadinsky District, Penza Oblast, a village in Bolshelukinsky Selsoviet of Vadinsky District

=== Perm Krai ===
As of 2012, five rural localities in Perm Krai bear this name:

- Kamenka, Kungursky District, Perm Krai, a village in Kungursky District
- Kamenka, Osinsky District, Perm Krai, a village in Osinsky District
- Kamenka, Sivinsky District, Perm Krai, a village in Sivinsky District
- Kamenka, Suksunsky District, Perm Krai, a village in Suksunsky District
- Kamenka, Vereshchaginsky District, Perm Krai, a village in Vereshchaginsky District

=== Primorsky Krai ===
As of 2012, two rural localities in Primorsky Krai bear this name:

- Kamenka, Dalnegorsk, Primorsky Krai, a selo under the administrative jurisdiction of Dalnegorsk Town Under Krai Jurisdiction
- Kamenka, Chuguyevsky District, Primorsky Krai, a selo in Chuguyevsky District

=== Pskov Oblast ===
As of 2012, twenty-four rural localities in Pskov Oblast bear this name:

- Kamenka, Bezhanitsky District, Pskov Oblast, a village in Bezhanitsky District
- Kamenka, Dedovichsky District, Pskov Oblast, a village in Dedovichsky District
- Kamenka, Dnovsky District, Pskov Oblast, a village in Dnovsky District
- Kamenka, Gdovsky District, Pskov Oblast, a village in Gdovsky District
- Kamenka (Podberezinskaya Rural Settlement), Loknyansky District, Pskov Oblast, a village in Loknyansky District; municipally, a part of Podberezinskaya Rural Settlement of that district
- Kamenka (Miritinitskaya Rural Settlement), Loknyansky District, Pskov Oblast, a village in Loknyansky District; municipally, a part of Miritinitskaya Rural Settlement of that district
- Kamenka, Nevelsky District, Pskov Oblast, a village in Nevelsky District
- Kamenka (Makushinskaya Rural Settlement), Opochetsky District, Pskov Oblast, a village in Opochetsky District; municipally, a part of Makushinskaya Rural Settlement of that district
- Kamenka (Varyginskaya Rural Settlement), Opochetsky District, Pskov Oblast, a village in Opochetsky District; municipally, a part of Varyginskaya Rural Settlement of that district
- Kamenka (Vorontsovskaya Rural Settlement), Ostrovsky District, Pskov Oblast, a village in Ostrovsky District; municipally, a part of Vorontsovskaya Rural Settlement of that district
- Kamenka (Gorayskaya Rural Settlement), Ostrovsky District, Pskov Oblast, a village in Ostrovsky District; municipally, a part of Gorayskaya Rural Settlement of that district
- Kamenka (Volkovskaya Rural Settlement), Ostrovsky District, Pskov Oblast, a village in Ostrovsky District; municipally, a part of Volkovskaya Rural Settlement of that district
- Kamenka (Kuleyskaya Rural Settlement), Pechorsky District, Pskov Oblast, a village in Pechorsky District; municipally, a part of Kuleyskaya Rural Settlement of that district
- Kamenka (Izborskaya Rural Settlement), Pechorsky District, Pskov Oblast, a village in Pechorsky District; municipally, a part of Izborskaya Rural Settlement of that district
- Kamenka, Plyussky District, Pskov Oblast, a village in Plyussky District
- Kamenka (Tugotinskaya Rural Settlement), Porkhovsky District, Pskov Oblast, a village in Porkhovsky District; municipally, a part of Tugotinskaya Rural Settlement of that district
- Kamenka (Slavkovskaya Rural Settlement), Porkhovsky District, Pskov Oblast, a village in Porkhovsky District; municipally, a part of Slavkovskaya Rural Settlement of that district
- Kamenka (Polonskaya Rural Settlement), Porkhovsky District, Pskov Oblast, a village in Porkhovsky District; municipally, a part of Polonskaya Rural Settlement of that district
- Kamenka, Pskovsky District, Pskov Oblast, a village in Pskovsky District
- Kamenka (Zabelskaya Rural Settlement), Pustoshkinsky District, Pskov Oblast, a village in Pustoshkinsky District; municipally, a part of Zabelskaya Rural Settlement of that district
- Kamenka (Shchukinskaya Rural Settlement), Pustoshkinsky District, Pskov Oblast, a village in Pustoshkinsky District; municipally, a part of Shchukinskaya Rural Settlement of that district
- Kamenka (Cherpesskaya Rural Settlement), Velikoluksky District, Pskov Oblast, a village in Velikoluksky District; municipally, a part of Cherpesskaya Rural Settlement of that district
- Kamenka (Lychevskaya Rural Settlement), Velikoluksky District, Pskov Oblast, a village in Velikoluksky District; municipally, a part of Lychevskaya Rural Settlement of that district
- Kamenka (Bukrovskaya Rural Settlement), Velikoluksky District, Pskov Oblast, a village in Velikoluksky District; municipally, a part of Bukrovskaya Rural Settlement of that district

=== Rostov Oblast ===
As of 2012, three rural localities in Rostov Oblast bear this name:

- Kamenka, Bokovsky District, Rostov Oblast, a khutor in Krasnokutskoye Rural Settlement of Bokovsky District
- Kamenka, Kasharsky District, Rostov Oblast, a selo in Popovskoye Rural Settlement of Kasharsky District
- Kamenka, Millerovsky District, Rostov Oblast, a khutor in Krivorozhskoye Rural Settlement of Millerovsky District

=== Ryazan Oblast ===
As of 2012, four rural localities in Ryazan Oblast bear this name:

- Kamenka, Korablinsky District, Ryazan Oblast, a village in Nikitinsky Rural Okrug of Korablinsky District
- Kamenka, Pitelinsky District, Ryazan Oblast, a village in Petsky Rural Okrug of Pitelinsky District
- Kamenka, Sasovsky District, Ryazan Oblast, a village in Pridorozhny Rural Okrug of Sasovsky District
- Kamenka, Spassky District, Ryazan Oblast, a village in Ogorodnikovsky Rural Okrug of Spassky District

=== Samara Oblast ===
As of 2012, two rural localities in Samara Oblast bear this name:

- Kamenka, Isaklinsky District, Samara Oblast, a settlement in Isaklinsky District
- Kamenka, Shentalinsky District, Samara Oblast, a selo in Shentalinsky District

=== Saratov Oblast ===
As of 2012, six rural localities in Saratov Oblast bear this name:

- Kamenka, Krasnoarmeysky District, Saratov Oblast, a selo in Krasnoarmeysky District
- Kamenka, Marksovsky District, Saratov Oblast, a selo in Marksovsky District
- Kamenka, Pugachyovsky District, Saratov Oblast, a selo in Pugachyovsky District
- Kamenka, Rtishchevsky District, Saratov Oblast, a selo in Rtishchevsky District
- Kamenka, Samoylovsky District, Saratov Oblast, a selo in Samoylovsky District
- Kamenka, Turkovsky District, Saratov Oblast, a selo in Turkovsky District

=== Smolensk Oblast ===
As of 2012, eleven rural localities in Smolensk Oblast bear this name:

- Kamenka, Demidovsky District, Smolensk Oblast, a village in Kartsevskoye Rural Settlement of Demidovsky District
- Kamenka, Dukhovshchinsky District, Smolensk Oblast, a village in Bulgakovskoye Rural Settlement of Dukhovshchinsky District
- Kamenka, Gagarinsky District, Smolensk Oblast, a village in Pokrovskoye Rural Settlement of Gagarinsky District
- Kamenka, Glinkovsky District, Smolensk Oblast, a village in Boltutinskoye Rural Settlement of Glinkovsky District
- Kamenka, Kardymovsky District, Smolensk Oblast, a village in Kamenskoye Rural Settlement of Kardymovsky District
- Kamenka, Roslavlsky District, Smolensk Oblast, a village in Kostyrevskoye Rural Settlement of Roslavlsky District
- Kamenka, Rudnyansky District, Smolensk Oblast, a village in Ponizovskoye Rural Settlement of Rudnyansky District
- Kamenka, Smolensky District, Smolensk Oblast, a village in Novoselskoye Rural Settlement of Smolensky District
- Kamenka, Ugransky District, Smolensk Oblast, a village in Kholmovskoye Rural Settlement of Ugransky District
- Kamenka, Meshcherskoye Rural Settlement, Vyazemsky District, Smolensk Oblast, a village in Meshcherskoye Rural Settlement of Vyazemsky District
- Kamenka, Tumanovskoye Rural Settlement, Vyazemsky District, Smolensk Oblast, a village in Tumanovskoye Rural Settlement of Vyazemsky District

=== Stavropol Krai ===
As of 2012, one rural locality in Stavropol Krai bears this name:

- Kamenka, Stavropol Krai, a settlement in Kamennobalkovsky Selsoviet of Blagodarnensky District

=== Sverdlovsk Oblast ===
As of 2012, seven rural localities in Sverdlovsk Oblast bear this name:

- Kamenka, Krasnouralsk, Sverdlovsk Oblast, a settlement in Dachny Selsoviet under the administrative jurisdiction of the Town of Krasnouralsk
- Kamenka, Pervouralsk, Sverdlovsk Oblast, a village in Nizhneselsky Selsoviet under the administrative jurisdiction of the City of Pervouralsk
- Kamenka, Artyomovsky District, Sverdlovsk Oblast, a settlement in Lebedkinsky Selsoviet of Artyomovsky District
- Kamenka, Beloyarsky District, Sverdlovsk Oblast, a settlement in Rezhikovsky Selsoviet of Beloyarsky District
- Kamenka, Novolyalinsky District, Sverdlovsk Oblast, a settlement under the administrative jurisdiction of the Town of Novaya Lyalya in Novolyalinsky District
- Kamenka, Rezhevskoy District, Sverdlovsk Oblast, a selo in Klevakinsky Selsoviet of Rezhevsky District
- Kamenka, Sysertsky District, Sverdlovsk Oblast, a settlement under the administrative jurisdiction of the Town of Sysert in Sysertsky District

=== Tambov Oblast ===
As of 2012, one rural locality in Tambov Oblast bears this name:

- Kamenka, Tambov Oblast, a selo in Kamensky Selsoviet of Rzhaksinsky District

=== Republic of Tatarstan ===
As of 2012, two rural localities in the Republic of Tatarstan bear this name:

- Kamenka, Almetyevsky District, Republic of Tatarstan, a settlement in Almetyevsky District
- Kamenka, Aznakayevsky District, Republic of Tatarstan, a village in Aznakayevsky District

=== Tula Oblast ===
As of 2012, eleven rural localities in Tula Oblast bear this name:

- Kamenka, Belyovsky District, Tula Oblast, a village in Rovensky Rural Okrug of Belyovsky District
- Kamenka, Bogoroditsky District, Tula Oblast, a village in Korsakovsky Rural Okrug of Bogoroditsky District
- Kamenka, Kimovsky District, Tula Oblast, a village in Krasnopolsky Rural Okrug of Kimovsky District
- Kamenka, Kireyevsky District, Tula Oblast, a village in Bolshekalmyksky Rural Okrug of Kireyevsky District
- Kamenka, Prishnenskaya Rural Administration, Shchyokinsky District, Tula Oblast, a village in Prishnenskaya Rural Administration of Shchyokinsky District
- Kamenka, Zherdevskaya Rural Administration, Shchyokinsky District, Tula Oblast, a selo in Zherdevskaya Rural Administration of Shchyokinsky District
- Kamenka, Uzlovsky District, Tula Oblast, a selo in Kamenskaya Rural Administration of Uzlovsky District
- Kamenka, Venyovsky District, Tula Oblast, a village in Mordvessky Rural Okrug of Venyovsky District
- Kamenka, Yasnogorsky District, Tula Oblast, a village in Arkhangelskaya Rural Territory of Yasnogorsky District
- Kamenka, Yefremovsky District, Tula Oblast, a village in Stepnokhutorskoy Rural Okrug of Yefremovsky District
- Kamenka, Zaoksky District, Tula Oblast, a selo in Pakhomovsky Rural Okrug of Zaoksky District

=== Tver Oblast ===
As of 2012, fifteen rural localities in Tver Oblast bear this name:

- Kamenka, Firovsky District, Tver Oblast, a village in Rozhdestvenskoye Rural Settlement of Firovsky District
- Kamenka, Kalininsky District, Tver Oblast, a village in Burashevskoye Rural Settlement of Kalininsky District
- Kamenka, Kalyazinsky District, Tver Oblast, a village in Alferovskoye Rural Settlement of Kalyazinsky District
- Kamenka, Krasnokholmsky District, Tver Oblast, a village in Barbinskoye Rural Settlement of Krasnokholmsky District
- Kamenka, Lesnoy District, Tver Oblast, a village in Medvedkovskoye Rural Settlement of Lesnoy District
- Kamenka, Maksatikhinsky District, Tver Oblast, a village in Kamenskoye Rural Settlement of Maksatikhinsky District
- Kamenka, Molokovsky District, Tver Oblast, a village in Deledinskoye Rural Settlement of Molokovsky District
- Kamenka, Nelidovsky District, Tver Oblast, a village in Selyanskoye Rural Settlement of Nelidovsky District
- Kamenka, Gusevskoye Rural Settlement, Oleninsky District, Tver Oblast, a village in Gusevskoye Rural Settlement of Oleninsky District
- Kamenka, Kholmetskoye Rural Settlement, Oleninsky District, Tver Oblast, a village in Kholmetskoye Rural Settlement of Oleninsky District
- Kamenka, Rameshkovsky District, Tver Oblast, a village in Nekrasovo Rural Settlement of Rameshkovsky District
- Kamenka, Selizharovsky District, Tver Oblast, a village in Berezugskoye Rural Settlement of Selizharovsky District
- Kamenka, Toropetsky District, Tver Oblast, a village in Rechanskoye Rural Settlement of Toropetsky District
- Kamenka, Udomelsky District, Tver Oblast, a village in Porozhkinskoye Rural Settlement of Udomelsky District
- Kamenka, Vesyegonsky District, Tver Oblast, a village in Romanovskoye Rural Settlement of Vesyegonsky District

=== Tyumen Oblast ===
As of 2012, two rural localities in Tyumen Oblast bear this name:

- Kamenka, Tyumensky District, Tyumen Oblast, a selo in Kamensky Rural Okrug of Tyumensky District
- Kamenka, Zavodoukovsky District, Tyumen Oblast, a village in Zavodoukovsky District

=== Ulyanovsk Oblast ===
As of 2012, one rural locality in Ulyanovsk Oblast bears this name:

- Kamenka, Ulyanovsk Oblast, a settlement under the administrative jurisdiction of Leninsky City District of the city of oblast significance of Ulyanovsk

=== Vladimir Oblast ===
As of 2012, three rural localities in Vladimir Oblast bear this name:

- Kamenka, Alexandrovsky District, Vladimir Oblast, a village in Alexandrovsky District
- Kamenka, Melenkovsky District, Vladimir Oblast, a village in Melenkovsky District
- Kamenka, Yuryev-Polsky District, Vladimir Oblast, a selo in Yuryev-Polsky District

=== Volgograd Oblast ===
As of 2012, three rural localities in Volgograd Oblast bear this name:

- Kamenka, Novonikolayevsky District, Volgograd Oblast, a khutor in Serpo-Molotsky Selsoviet of Novonikolayevsky District
- Kamenka, Oktyabrsky District, Volgograd Oblast, a selo in Kovalevsky Selsoviet of Oktyabrsky District
- Kamenka, Uryupinsky District, Volgograd Oblast, a khutor in Olshansky Selsoviet of Uryupinsky District

=== Vologda Oblast ===
As of 2012, five rural localities in Vologda Oblast bear this name:

- Kamenka, Kamensky Selsoviet, Gryazovetsky District, Vologda Oblast, a settlement in Kamensky Selsoviet of Gryazovetsky District
- Kamenka, Vokhtogsky Selsoviet, Gryazovetsky District, Vologda Oblast, a village in Vokhtogsky Selsoviet of Gryazovetsky District
- Kamenka, Krasnopolyansky Selsoviet, Nikolsky District, Vologda Oblast, a village in Krasnopolyansky Selsoviet of Nikolsky District
- Kamenka, Milofanovsky Selsoviet, Nikolsky District, Vologda Oblast, a village in Milofanovsky Selsoviet of Nikolsky District
- Kamenka, Verkhovazhsky District, Vologda Oblast, a settlement in Chushevitsky Selsoviet of Verkhovazhsky District

=== Voronezh Oblast ===
As of 2012, four inhabited localities in Voronezh Oblast bear this name:

Urban localities

- Kamenka, Kamensky District, Voronezh Oblast, an urban-type settlement in Kamensky District

Rural localities

- Kamenka, Povorinsky District, Voronezh Oblast, a selo in Baychurovskoye Rural Settlement of Povorinsky District
- Kamenka, Semiluksky District, Voronezh Oblast, a khutor in Starovedugskoye Rural Settlement of Semiluksky District
- Kamenka, Vorobyovsky District, Voronezh Oblast, a selo in Solonetskoye Rural Settlement of Vorobyovsky District

=== Yaroslavl Oblast ===
As of 2012, three rural localities in Yaroslavl Oblast bear this name:

- Kamenka, Poshekhonsky District, Yaroslavl Oblast, a village in Fedorkovsky Rural Okrug of Poshekhonsky District
- Kamenka, Tutayevsky District, Yaroslavl Oblast, a village in Nikolo-Edomsky Rural Okrug of Tutayevsky District
- Kamenka, Yaroslavsky District, Yaroslavl Oblast, a village in Kuznechikhinsky Rural Okrug of Yaroslavsky District

=== Zabaykalsky Krai ===
As of 2012, one rural locality in Zabaykalsky Krai bears this name:

- Kamenka, Zabaykalsky Krai, a settlement in Chitinsky District

== Abolished localities ==
- Kamenka, Bolshesosnovsky District, Perm Krai, a village in Bolshesosnovsky District of Perm Krai; abolished in December 2011

== Renamed localities ==
- Kamenka, name of Novaya Kamenka, a village in Zaytsevskoye Settlement of Krestetsky District in Novgorod Oblast, before June 2011
- Kamenka, name of Staraya Kamenka, a village in Dubrovskoye Settlement of Soletsky District in Novgorod Oblast, before June 2011

== Alternative names ==
- Kamenka, alternative name of Kamennaya Lyvka, a village in Pavinskoye Settlement of Pavinsky District in Kostroma Oblast; 59°7′N 46°14′E
- Kamenka, alternative name of Bolshaya Kamenka, a village in Noskovskoye Settlement of Pyshchugsky District in Kostroma Oblast; 59°3′N 45°36′E
- Kamenka, alternative name of Kamenka (v tom chisle razyezd Svechinsky), a village in Tulsky Selsoviet of Terbunsky District in Lipetsk Oblast; 52°13′N 38°20′E
- Kamenka, alternative name of Vtoraya Kamenka, a selo in Vtorokamensky Selsoviet of Loktevsky District in Altai Krai; 51°3′N 81°45′E
- Kamenka, alternative name of Pervokamenka, a selo in Pervokamensky Selsoviet of Tretyakovsky District in Altai Krai; 50°58′N 82°16′E
- Kamenka, alternative name of Kamennoye, a selo in Bolshesamovetsky Selsoviet of Gryazinsky District in Lipetsk Oblast; 52°31′N 39°53′E
