= Domikan =

Domikan (Russian: Домикан) is the name of several rural localities in Russia:

- Domikan (village), a selo in Novospassky Selsoviet of Arkharinsky District of Amur Oblast
- Domikan (station), a selo in Chernigovsky Selsoviet of Arkharinsky District of Amur Oblast
