= Krasnoye Razdolye =

Krasnoye Razdolye Красное Раздолье
- Settlement
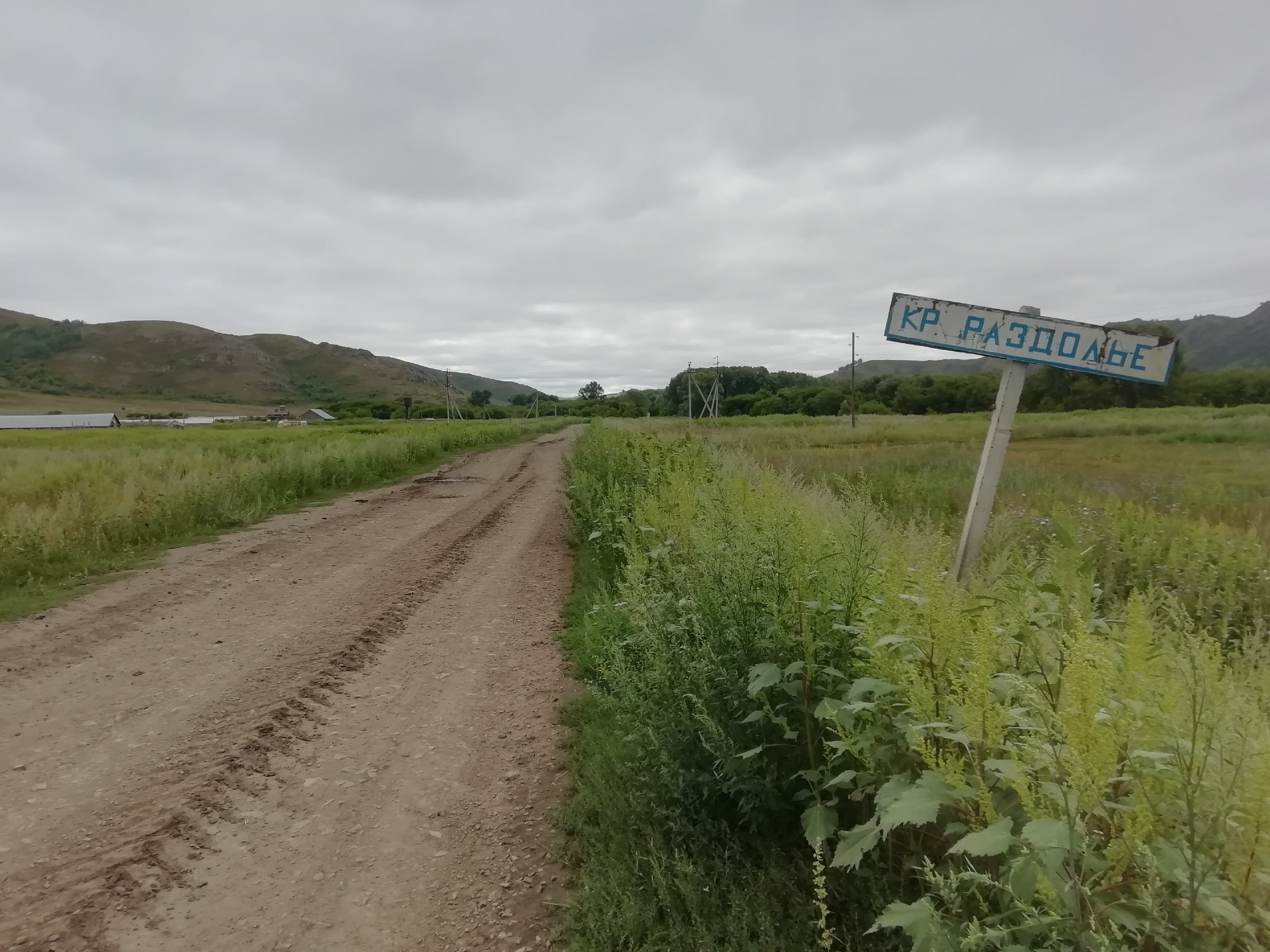

- Location within Altai Krai Location within Russia
- Coordinates: 50°54′N 82°20′E
- Country: Russia
- Region: Altai Krai
- District: Tretyakovsky District
- Time zone: UTC+7:00

Krasnoye Razdolye (Russian: Красное Раздолье) is a rural locality (a settlement) in Shipunikhinsky Selsoviet, Tretyakovsky District, Altai Krai, Russia. The population was 13 as of 2013. There is 1 street.

== Geography ==
Krasnoye Razdolye is located 39 km southeast of Staroaleyskoye (the district's administrative centre) by road. Pervokamenka is the nearest rural locality.
