= Novoznamenka, Kuryinsky District, Altai Krai =

Novoznamenka Новознаменка
- Settlement
- Location within Altai Krai Location within Russia
- Coordinates: 51°39′N 82°16′E
- Country: Russia
- Region: Altai Krai
- District: Kuryinsky District
- Time zone: UTC+7:00

Novoznamenka (Russian: Новознаменка) is a rural locality (a settlement) in Krasnoznamensky Selsoviet, Kuryinsky District, Altai Krai, Russia. The population was 41 as of 2013. There is 1 street.

== Geography ==
Novoznamenka is located 10 km north of Kurya (the district's administrative centre) by road. Krasnoznamenka is the nearest rural locality.
