= Kulustay =

Kulustay Кулустай
- Station
- Location within Amur Oblast Location within Russia
- Coordinates: 49°45′N 129°54′E
- Country: Russia
- Region: Amur Oblast
- District: Arkharinsky District
- Time zone: UTC+9:00

Kulustay (Russian: Кулустай) is a rural locality (a station) in Chernigovsky Selsoviet of Arkharinsky District, Amur Oblast, Russia. The population was 4 as of 2018.

== Geography ==
Kulustay is located near the left bank of the Bureya River, 57 km north of Arkhara (the district's administrative centre) by road. Kamenka is the nearest rural locality.
