= Novoaleyskoye =

Novoaleyskoye Новоалейское
- Selo
- Location within Altai Krai Location within Russia
- Coordinates: 50°50′N 82°24′E
- Country: Russia
- Region: Altai Krai
- District: Tretyakovsky District
- Time zone: UTC+7:00

Novoaleyskoye (Russian: Новоалейское) is a rural locality (a selo) and the administrative center of Novoaleysky Selsoviet, Tretyakovsky District, Altai Krai, Russia. The population was 469 as of 2013. There are 3 streets.

== Geography ==
Novoaleyskoye is located 53 km southeast of Staroaleyskoye (the district's administrative centre) by road. Verkh-Aleyka is the nearest rural locality.
