= Ruchyovo =

Ruchyovo Ручьёво
- Selo
- Location within Altai Krai Location within Russia
- Coordinates: 51°24′N 82°20′E
- Country: Russia
- Region: Altai Krai
- District: Kuryinsky District
- Time zone: UTC+7:00

Ruchyovo (Russian: Ручьёво) is a rural locality (a selo) in Kazantsevsky Selsoviet, Kuryinsky District, Altai Krai, Russia. The population was 182 as of 2013. There are 4 streets.

== Geography ==
Ruchyovo is located 29 km south of Kurya (the district's administrative centre) by road. Kazantsevo is the nearest rural locality.
