= Novospassk =

Novospassk Новоспасск
- Selo
- Location within Amur Oblast Location within Russia
- Coordinates: 49°39′N 129°47′E
- Country: Russia
- Region: Amur Oblast
- District: Arkharinsky District
- Time zone: UTC+9:00

Novospassk (Russian: Новоспасск) is a rural locality (a selo) and the administrative center of Novosergeyevsky Selsoviet of Arkharinsky District, Amur Oblast, Russia. The population was 195 as of 2018. There are 6 streets.

== Geography ==
Novospassk is located on the left bak of the Bureya River, 63 km northwest of Arkhara (the district's administrative centre) by road. Domikan is the nearest rural locality.
