= Levy Bereg =

Levy Bereg Левый Берег
- Selo
- Location within Amur Oblast Location within Russia
- Coordinates: 49°47′N 129°52′E
- Country: Russia
- Region: Amur Oblast
- District: Arkharinsky District
- Time zone: UTC+9:00

Levy Bereg (Russian: Левый Берег) is a rural locality (a selo) in Chernigovsky Selsoviet of Arkharinsky District, Amur Oblast, Russia. The population was 1 as of 2018. There is 1 street.

== Geography ==
Levy Bereg is located on the left bank of the Bureya River, 59 km north of Arkhara (the district's administrative centre) by road. Novobureysky is the nearest rural locality.
