= Pepelyshi =

Pepelyshi Пепелыши
- Village
- Location within Perm Krai Location within Russia
- Coordinates: 57°11′N 57°29′E
- Country: Russia
- Region: Perm Krai
- District: Suksunsky District
- Time zone: UTC+5:00

Pepelyshi (Russian: Пепелыши) is a rural locality (a village) in Suksunsky District, Perm Krai, Russia. The population was 180 as of 2010. There are 4 streets.

== Geography ==
Pepelyshi is located 12 km northeast of Suksun (the district's administrative centre) by road. Sasykovo is the nearest rural locality.
