= Novogalstovka =

Novogalstovka Новогальцовка
- Settlement
- Location within Altai Krai Location within Russia
- Coordinates: 50°58′N 82°02′E
- Country: Russia
- Region: Altai Krai
- District: Tretyakovsky District
- Time zone: UTC+7:00

Novogalstovka (Russian: Новогальцовка) is a rural locality (a settlement) in Staroaleysky Selsoviet, Tretyakovsky District, Altai Krai, Russia. The population was 129 as of 2013. There is 1 street.

== Geography ==
Novogalstovka is located 5 km southeast of Staroaleyskoye (the district's administrative centre) by road. Staroaleyskoye is the nearest rural locality.
