= Yerakhta =

Yerakhta Ерахта
- Selo
- Interactive map of Yerakhta
- Location of Yerakhta Yerakhta (Amur Oblast)
- Coordinates: 49°24′54″N 130°17′27″E
- Country: Russia
- Federal subject: Amur Oblast
- Administrative district: Arkharinsky District
- SelsovietSelsoviet: Gribovsky Selsoviet

Population
  - Estimate (2018): 5 )
- Time zone: UTC+9 (MSK+6)
- Postal code: 676742
- OKTMO ID: 10605412111

Yerakhta (Russian: Ерахта) is a rural locality (a selo) in Arkharinsky District, Amur Oblast, Russia. The locality's population is 5 as of 2018.

== Geography ==
Yerakhta is located on the left bank of the Arkhara River, 20 km east of Arkhara (the district's administrative centre) by road. Zarechnoye is the nearest rural locality.
