= Gornovka =

Gornovka Горновка
- Settlement
- Location within Altai Krai Location within Russia
- Coordinates: 51°30′N 82°05′E
- Country: Russia
- Region: Altai Krai
- District: Kuryinsky District
- Time zone: UTC+7:00

Gornovka (Russian: Горновка) is a rural locality (a settlement) in Ivanovsky Selsoviet, Kuryinsky District, Altai Krai, Russia. The population was 168 as of 2013. There are 4 streets.

== Geography ==
Gornovka is located on the Milovanovka River, 25 km southwest of Kurya (the district's administrative centre) by road. Ivanovka is the nearest rural locality.
