= Tatakan =

Tatakan Северное
- Railway station
- Location within Amur Oblast Location within Russia
- Coordinates: 49°20′N 130°09′E
- Country: Russia
- Region: Amur Oblast
- District: Arkharinsky District
- Time zone: UTC+9:00

Tatakan (Russian: Татакан) is a rural locality (a railway station) in Otvazhnensky Selsoviet of Arkharinsky District, Amur Oblast, Russia. The population was 85 as of 2018. There is 1 street.

== Geography ==
Tatakan is located near the left bank of the Arkhara River, 11 km southeast of Arkhara (the district's administrative centre) by road. Otvazhnoye is the nearest rural locality.
