= Yadrino =

Yadrino Ядрино
- Selo
- Location within Amur Oblast Location within Russia
- Coordinates: 48°58′N 131°01′E
- Country: Russia
- Region: Amur Oblast
- District: Arkharinsky District
- Time zone: UTC+9:00

Yadrino (Russian: Ядрино) is a rural locality (a selo) and the administrative center of Chernigovsky Selsoviet of Arkharinsky District, Amur Oblast, Russia. The population was 475 as of 2018. There are 29 streets.

== Geography ==
Yadrino is located on the right bank of the Khingan River, 98 km southeast of Arkhara (the district's administrative centre) by road. Obluchye is the nearest rural locality.
