= Posyolok imeni 8 Marta =

Posyolok imeni 8 Marta Посёлок имени 8 Марта
- Settlement
- Location within Altai Krai Location within Russia
- Coordinates: 51°18′N 82°38′E
- Country: Russia
- Region: Altai Krai
- District: Kuryinsky District
- Time zone: UTC+7:00

Posyolok imeni 8 Marta (Russian: Посёлок имени 8 Марта) is a rural locality (a settlement) in Kolyvansky Selsoviet, Kuryinsky District, Altai Krai, Russia. The population was 152 as of 2013. There are 4 streets.

== Geography ==
Posyolok imeni 8 Marta is located 58 km southeast of Kurya (the district's administrative centre) by road. Kolyvan is the nearest rural locality.
