= Lopatinka =

Lopatinka Лопатинка
- Settlement
- Location within Altai Krai Location within Russia
- Coordinates: 50°54′N 82°05′E
- Country: Russia
- Region: Altai Krai
- District: Tretyakovsky District
- Time zone: UTC+7:00

Lopatinka (Russian: Лопатинка) is a rural locality (a settlement) in Yekaterininsky Selsoviet, Tretyakovsky District, Altai Krai, Russia. The population was 104 as of 2013. There is 1 street.

== Geography ==
Lopatinka is located 23 km southeast of Staroaleyskoye (the district's administrative centre) by road. Novokamyshenka is the nearest rural locality.
