= Sasykovo =

Sasykovo Сасыково
- Village
- Location within Perm Krai Location within Russia
- Coordinates: 57°11′N 57°27′E
- Country: Russia
- Region: Perm Krai
- District: Suksunsky District
- Time zone: UTC+5:00

Sasykovo (Russian: Сасыково) is a rural locality (a village) in Suksunsky District, Perm Krai, Russia. The population was 124 as of 2010. There are six streets.

== Geography ==
Sasykovo is located 8 km northeast of Suksun (the district's administrative centre) by road. Pepelyshi is the nearest rural locality.
