= Klyuchi, Suksunsky District, Perm Krai =

Klyuchi Ключи
- Selo
- Location within Perm Krai Location within Russia
- Coordinates: 57°00′N 57°24′E
- Country: Russia
- Region: Perm Krai
- District: Suksunsky District
- Time zone: UTC+5:00

Klyuchi (Russian: Ключи) is a rural locality (a selo) and the administrative center of Klyuchevskoye Rural Settlement, Suksunsky District, Perm Krai, Russia. The population was 1,671 as of 2010. There are 14 streets.

== Geography ==
Klyuchi is located 16 km south of Suksun (the district's administrative centre) by road. Bryokhovo is the nearest rural locality.
