= Gribovka =

Gribovka Грибовка
- Selo
- Interactive map of Gribovka
- Location of Gribovka Gribovka (Amur Oblast)
- Coordinates: 49°28′12″N 130°22′22″E
- Country: Russia
- Federal subject: Amur Oblast
- Administrative district: Arkharinsky District
- SelsovietSelsoviet: Gribovsky Selsoviet

Population
  - Estimate (2018): 182 )

Administrative status
  - Capital of: Gribovsky Selsoviet
- Time zone: UTC+9 (MSK+6)
- Postal code: 676745
- OKTMO ID: 10605412101

Gribovka (Russian: Грибовка) is a rural locality (a selo) and the administrative center of Gribovsky Selsoviet of Arkharinsky District of Amur Oblast, Russia. Population: 182 as of 2018.

== Geography ==
Gribovka is located on the right bank of the Arkhara River, 25 km east of Arkhara (the district's administrative centre) by road. Mogilyovka is the nearest rural locality.
