= Yesaulovka =

Yesaulovka Есауловка
- Station
- Interactive map of Yesaulovka
- Location of Yesaulovka Yesaulovka (Amur Oblast)
- Coordinates: 49°00′14″N 130°54′49″E
- Country: Russia
- Federal subject: Amur Oblast
- Administrative district: Arkharinsky District
- SelsovietSelsoviet: Yadrinsky Selsoviet

Population
  - Estimate (2018): 2 )
- Time zone: UTC+9 (MSK+6)
- Postal code: 676767
- OKTMO ID: 10605472106

Yesaulovka (Russian: Есауловка) is a rural locality (a station) in Arkharinsky District, Amur Oblast, Russia. The locality's population is 2 as of 2018.

== Geography ==
Yesaulovka is located near the right bank of the Khingan River, 85 km southeast of Arkhara (the district's administrative centre) by road. Yadrino and Kazachy are the nearest rural localities.
