= Verkh-Aleyka =

Verkh-Aleyka Верх-Алейка
- Selo
- Location within Altai Krai Location within Russia
- Coordinates: 50°51′N 82°26′E
- Country: Russia
- Region: Altai Krai
- District: Tretyakovsky District
- Time zone: UTC+7:00

Verkh-Aleyka (Russian: Верх-Алейка) is a rural locality (a selo) in Novoaleysky Selsoviet, Tretyakovsky District, Altai Krai, Russia. The population was 234 as of 2013. There are 4 streets.

== Geography ==
Verkh-Aleyka is located 57 km southeast of Staroaleyskoye (the district's administrative centre) by road. Novoaleyskoye is the nearest rural locality.
