= Gulikovka =

Gulikovka Гуликовка
- Selo
- Interactive map of Gulikovka
- Location of Gulikovka Gulikovka (Amur Oblast)
- Coordinates: 49°43′21″N 129°51′50″E
- Country: Russia
- Federal subject: Amur Oblast
- Administrative district: Arkharinsky District
- SelsovietSelsoviet: Chernigovsky Selsoviet

Population
  - Estimate (2018): 14 )
- Time zone: UTC+9 (MSK+6)
- Postal code: 676740
- OKTMO ID: 10605468116

Gulikovka (Russian: Гуликовка) is a rural locality (a selo) in Arkharinsky District, Amur Oblast, Russia. Population: 14 as of 2018.

== Geography ==
Gulikovka is located on the left bank of the Bureya River, 58 km north of Arkhara (the district's administrative centre) by road. Domikan (village) is the nearest rural locality.
