= Novokamyshenka =

Novokamyshenka Новокамышенка
- Settlement
- Location within Altai Krai Location within Russia
- Coordinates: 50°56′N 82°06′E
- Country: Russia
- Region: Altai Krai
- District: Tretyakovsky District
- Time zone: UTC+7:00

Novokamyshenka (Russian: Новокамышенка) is a rural locality (a settlement) in Yekaterininsky Selsoviet, Tretyakovsky District, Altai Krai, Russia. The population was 276 as of 2013. There are 2 streets.

== Geography ==
Novokamyshenka is located 16 km southeast of Staroaleyskoye (the district's administrative centre) by road. Lopatinka is the nearest rural locality.
