= Novodomikan =

Novodomikan Новодомикан
- Selo
- Location within Amur Oblast Location within Russia
- Coordinates: 49°40′N 129°57′E
- Country: Russia
- Region: Amur Oblast
- District: Arkharinsky District
- Time zone: UTC+9:00

Novodomikan (Russian: Новодомикан) is a rural locality (a selo) in Chernigovsky Selsoviet of Arkharinsky District, Amur Oblast, Russia. The population was 62 as of 2018. There are 3 streets.

== Geography ==
Novodomikan is located on the left bank of the Domikan River, 45 km north of Arkhara (the district's administrative centre) by road. Domikan is the nearest rural locality.
