= Zhuravlyovka =

Zhuravlyovka (Russian: Журавлёвка) is the name of several inhabited localities in Russia:

- Zhuravlyovka, Amur Oblast, a selo in Kasatkinsky Selsoviet, Arkharinsky District, Amur Oblast
- Zhuravlyovka, Belgorod Oblast, a selo in Belgorodsky District, Belgorod Oblast
- Zhuravlyovka, Republic of Bashkortostan, a village in Meselinsky Selsoviet, Aurgazinsky District, Bashkortostan
