= Kuryinsky =

Kuryinsky (masculine), Kuryinskaya (feminine), or Kuryinskoye (neuter) may refer to:

- Kuryinsky District, a district of Altai Krai, Russia
- Kuryinsky (rural locality), a rural locality (a settlement) in Novosibirsk Oblast, Russia
