= Zhuravlyovka, Amur Oblast =

Zhuravlyovka Журавлёвка
- Village
- Location within Amur Oblast Location within Russia
- Coordinates: 49°04′N 129°59′E
- Country: Russia
- Region: Amur Oblast
- District: Arkharinsky District
- Time zone: UTC+9:00

Zhuravlyovka (Russian: Журавлёвка) is a rural locality (a selo) in Kasatkinsky Selsoviet of Arkharinsky District, Amur Oblast, Russia. The population was 171 in 2018. There are 2 streets.

== Geography ==
Zhuravlyovka is located 53 km south of Arkhara (the district's administrative centre) by road. Kasatkino is the nearest rural locality.
