= Kamenka, Kuryinsky District, Altai Krai =

Kamenka Каменка
- Settlement
- Location within Altai Krai Location within Russia
- Coordinates: 51°19′N 82°22′E
- Country: Russia
- Region: Altai Krai
- District: Kuryinsky District
- Time zone: UTC+7:00

Kamenka (Russian: Каменка) is a rural locality (a settlement) in Kazantsevsky Selsoviet, Kuryinsky District, Altai Krai, Russia. The population was 58 as of 2013. There are 6 streets.

== Geography ==
Kamenka is located 39 km south of Kurya (the district's administrative centre) by road. Kazantsevo is the nearest rural locality.
