= Svobodnoye, Amur Oblast =

Svobodnoye Свободное
- Selo
- Location within Amur Oblast Location within Russia
- Coordinates: 49°31′N 129°35′E
- Country: Russia
- Region: Amur Oblast
- District: Arkharinsky District
- Time zone: UTC+9:00

Svobodnoye (Russian: Свободное) is a rural locality (a selo) in Kasatkinsky Selsoviet of Arkharinsky District, Amur Oblast, Russia. The population was 4 as of 2018. There is 1 street.

== Geography ==
Svobodnoye is located near the left bank of the Bureya River, 67 km northwest of Arkhara (the district's administrative centre) by road. Ukrainka is the nearest rural locality.
