= Novofirsovo =

Novofirsovo Новофирсово
- Selo
- Location within Altai Krai Location within Russia
- Coordinates: 51°45′N 82°11′E
- Country: Russia
- Region: Altai Krai
- District: Kuryinsky District
- Time zone: UTC+7:00

Novofirsovo (Russian: Новофирсово) is a rural locality (a selo) in Kuryinsky District, Altai Krai, Russia. The population was 532 as of 2013. There are 11 streets.

== Geography ==
Novofirsovo is located 21 km north of Kurya (the district's administrative centre) by road. Krasnoznamenka and Nikolayevka are the nearest rural localities.
