= Kamenka, Arkharinsky District, Amur Oblast =

Kamenka Каменка
- Village
- Location within Amur Oblast Location within Russia
- Coordinates: 49°46′N 129°54′E
- Country: Russia
- Region: Amur Oblast
- District: Arkharinsky District
- Time zone: UTC+9:00

Kamenka (Russian: Каменка) is a rural locality (a selo) in Chernigosky Selsoviet of Arkharinsky District, Amur Oblast, Russia. The population was 27 in 2018. There are 3 streets.

== Geography ==
Kamenka is located near the left bank of the Bureya River, 58 km north of Arkhara (the district's administrative centre) by road. Kulustay is the nearest rural locality.
