= Domikan (village) =

Rural locality in Arkharinsky District, Amur Oblast, Russia

Domikan Домикан
- Selo
- Interactive map of Domikan
- Location of Domikan Domikan (Amur Oblast)
- Coordinates: 49°41′16″N 129°52′09″E
- Country: Russia
- Federal subject: Amur Oblast
- Administrative district: Arkharinsky District
- SelsovietSelsoviet: Novospassky Selsoviet

Population
  - Estimate (2018): 176 )
- Time zone: UTC+9 (MSK+6)
- Postal code: 676740
- OKTMO ID: 10605452106

Domikan (Russian: Домикан) is a rural locality (a selo) in Arkharinsky District, Amur Oblast, Russia. Its population was 176 as of 2018.

== Geography ==
Domikan is located on the left bank of the Domikan River, 56 km north of Arkhara (the district's administrative centre) by road. Gulikovka is the nearest rural locality.
