= Domikan (station) =

Rural locality in Arkharinsky District, Amur Oblast, Russia

Domikan Домикан
- Station
- Interactive map of Domikan
- Location of Domikan Domikan (Amur Oblast)
- Coordinates: 49°39′10″N 129°56′00″E
- Country: Russia
- Federal subject: Amur Oblast
- Administrative district: Arkharinsky District
- SelsovietSelsoviet: Chernigovsky Selsoviet

Population
  - Estimate (2018): 59 )
- Time zone: UTC+9 (MSK+6)
- Postal code: 676770
- OKTMO ID: 10605468131

Domikan (Russian: Домикан) is a rural locality (a station) in Arkharinsky District, Amur Oblast, Russia. Population: 59 as of 2018.

== Geography ==
The station is located near the left bank of the Domikan River, 47 km north of Arkhara (the district's administrative centre) by road. Novodomikan is the nearest rural locality.
