= Kamenka, Suksunsky District, Perm Krai =

Kamenka Каменка
- Village
- Location within Perm Krai Location within Russia
- Coordinates: 57°10′N 57°47′E
- Country: Russia
- Region: Perm Krai
- District: Suksunsky District
- Time zone: UTC+5:00

Kamenka (Russian: Каменка) is a rural locality (a village) in Suksunsky District, Perm Krai, Russia. The population was 188 as of 2010. There are 5 streets.

== Geography ==
Kamenka is located 39 km east of Suksun (the district's administrative centre) by road. Krasny Lug is the nearest rural locality.
