= Svobodny (inhabited locality) =

Svobodny (Russian: Свобо́дный; masculine), Svobodnaya (Свобо́дная; feminine), or Svobodnoye (Свобо́дное; neuter) is the name of several inhabited localities in Russia.

== Republic of Adygea ==
As of 2010, one rural locality in the Republic of Adygea bears this name:

- Svobodny, Republic of Adygea, a settlement in Krasnogvardeysky District

== Altai Krai ==
As of 2010, one rural locality in Altai Krai bears this name:

- Svobodny, Altai Krai, a settlement in Zavodskoy Selsoviet of Tyumentsevsky District

== Amur Oblast ==
As of 2010, two inhabited localities in Amur Oblast bear this name:

- Svobodny, Amur Oblast, a town
- Svobodnoye, Amur Oblast, a selo in Novospassky Rural Settlement of Arkharinsky District

== Chechen Republic ==
As of 2010, one rural locality in the Chechen Republic bears this name:

- Svobodnoye, Chechen Republic, a selo in Naursky District

== Chelyabinsk Oblast ==
As of 2010, one rural locality in Chelyabinsk Oblast bears this name:

- Svobodny, Chelyabinsk Oblast, a settlement in Svobodnensky Selsoviet of Oktyabrsky District

== Kaliningrad Oblast ==
As of 2010, three rural localities in Kaliningrad Oblast bear this name:

- Svobodny, Kaliningrad Oblast, a settlement in Turgenevsky Rural Okrug of Polessky District
- Svobodnoye, Guryevsky District, Kaliningrad Oblast, a settlement in Kutuzovsky Rural Okrug of Guryevsky District
- Svobodnoye, Pravdinsky District, Kaliningrad Oblast, a settlement in Domnovsky Rural Okrug of Pravdinsky District

== Kemerovo Oblast ==
As of 2010, one rural locality in Kemerovo Oblast bears this name:

- Svobodny, Kemerovo Oblast, a settlement in Safonovskaya Rural Territory of Novokuznetsky District

== Khabarovsk Krai ==
As of 2010, one rural locality in Khabarovsk Krai bears this name:

- Svobodnoye, Khabarovsk Krai, a selo in Nikolayevsky District

== Kursk Oblast ==
As of 2010, one rural locality in Kursk Oblast bears this name:

- Svobodny, Kursk Oblast, a khutor in Kolbasovsky Selsoviet of Pristensky District

== Leningrad Oblast ==
As of 2010, one rural locality in Leningrad Oblast bears this name:

- Svobodnoye, Leningrad Oblast, a logging depot settlement under the administrative jurisdiction of Kamennogorskoye Settlement Municipal Formation of Vyborgsky District

== Lipetsk Oblast ==
As of 2010, one rural locality in Lipetsk Oblast bears this name:

- Svobodnaya, Lipetsk Oblast, a village in Ishcheinsky Selsoviet of Krasninsky District

== Republic of Mordovia ==
As of 2010, two rural localities in the Republic of Mordovia bear this name:

- Svobodny, Kochkurovsky District, Republic of Mordovia, a settlement in Voyevodsky Selsoviet of Kochkurovsky District
- Svobodny, Yelnikovsky District, Republic of Mordovia, a settlement in Bolsheurkatsky Selsoviet of Yelnikovsky District

== Nizhny Novgorod Oblast ==
As of 2010, four rural localities in Nizhny Novgorod Oblast bear this name:

- Svobodny, Naryshkinsky Selsoviet, Voznesensky District, Nizhny Novgorod Oblast, a settlement in Naryshkinsky Selsoviet of Voznesensky District
- Svobodny, Sarminsky Selsoviet, Voznesensky District, Nizhny Novgorod Oblast, a settlement in Sarminsky Selsoviet of Voznesensky District
- Svobodnoye, Nizhny Novgorod Oblast, a village in Krasnoslobodsky Selsoviet of Bor, Nizhny Novgorod Oblast
- Svobodnaya, Nizhny Novgorod Oblast, a village in Bolshetumanovsky Selsoviet of Arzamassky District

== Orenburg Oblast ==
As of 2010, one rural locality in Orenburg Oblast bears this name:

- Svobodny, Orenburg Oblast, a settlement in Novoorenburgsky Selsoviet of Kvarkensky District

== Primorsky Krai ==
As of 2010, one rural locality in Primorsky Krai bears this name:

- Svobodnoye, Primorsky Krai, a selo in Lazovsky District

== Rostov Oblast ==
As of 2010, four rural localities in Rostov Oblast bear this name:

- Svobodny, Kuybyshevsky District, Rostov Oblast, a khutor in Kuybyshevskoye Rural Settlement of Kuybyshevsky District
- Svobodny, Tatsinsky District, Rostov Oblast, a khutor in Yermakovskoye Rural Settlement of Tatsinsky District
- Svobodny, Tselinsky District, Rostov Oblast, a khutor in Kirovskoye Rural Settlement of Tselinsky District
- Svobodnoye, Rostov Oblast, a selo in Fedoseyevskoye Rural Settlement of Zavetinsky District

== Ryazan Oblast ==
As of 2010, two rural localities in Ryazan Oblast bear this name:

- Svobodny, Kadomsky District, Ryazan Oblast, a settlement in Voskhodsky Rural Okrug of Kadomsky District
- Svobodny, Ukholovsky District, Ryazan Oblast, a settlement in Solovachevsky Rural Okrug of Ukholovsky District

== Samara Oblast ==
As of 2010, one rural locality in Samara Oblast bears this name:

- Svobodny, Samara Oblast, a settlement in Kinelsky District

== Saratov Oblast ==
As of 2010, two inhabited localities in Saratov Oblast bear this name:

- Svobodny, Bazarno-Karabulaksky District, Saratov Oblast, an urban locality (a work settlement) in Bazarno-Karabulaksky District
- Svobodny, Dergachyovsky District, Saratov Oblast, a rural locality (a settlement) in Dergachyovsky District

== Sverdlovsk Oblast ==
As of 2010, one urban locality in Sverdlovsk Oblast bears this name:

- Svobodny, Sverdlovsk Oblast, an urban-type settlement
