= Svobodny =

Svobodny (masculine), Svobodnaya (feminine), or Svobodnoye (neuter) may refer to:

- Svobodny (inhabited locality) (Svobodnaya, Svobodnoye), name of several inhabited localities in Russia
- Svobodny Urban Okrug, name of several urban okrugs in Russia
- Svobodny Cosmodrome, a rocket launch site in Russia
