= Svobodny Urban Okrug =

Location of Amur Oblast in Russia

Location of Sverdlovsk Oblast in Russia

Svobodny Urban Okrug is the name of several municipal formations in Russia. The following administrative divisions are incorporated as such:

- Svobodny Urban Okrug, Amur Oblast
- Closed Administrative-Territorial Formation of Svobodny, Sverdlovsk Oblast

== See also ==
- Svobodny (disambiguation)
