= Kamenka, Uryupinsky District, Volgograd Oblast =

Kamenka Каменка
- Khutor
- Location within Volgograd Oblast Location within Russia
- Coordinates: 50°44′N 42°02′E
- Country: Russia
- Region: Volgograd Oblast
- District: Uryupinsky District
- Time zone: UTC+4:00

Kamenka (Russian: Каменка) is a rural locality (a khutor) in Dyakonovskoye Rural Settlement, Uryupinsky District, Volgograd Oblast, Russia. The population was 51 as of 2010.

== Geography ==
Kamenka is located on the left bank of the Kamenka River, 10 km southeast of Uryupinsk (the district's administrative centre) by road. 2-y Dyakonovsky is the nearest rural locality.
