= Pervokamenka =

Pervokamenka Первокаменка
- Village
- Location within Altai Krai Location within Russia
- Coordinates: 50°58′N 82°16′E
- Country: Russia
- Region: Altai Krai
- District: Tretyakovsky District
- Time zone: UTC+7:00

Pervokamenka (Russian: Первокаменка) is a rural locality (a selo) and the administrative center of Pervokamensky Selsoviet of Tretyakovsky District, Altai Krai, Russia. The population was 575 in 2016. There are 15 streets.

== Geography ==
Pervokamenka is located 27 km east of Staroaleyskoye (the district's administrative centre) by road. Shipunikha is the nearest rural locality.
