= Kamenka, Semiluksky District, Voronezh Oblast =

Kamenka Каменка
- Khutor
- Location within Voronezh Oblast Location within Russia
- Coordinates: 51°50′N 38°27′E
- Country: Russia
- Region: Voronezh Oblast
- District: Semiluksky District
- Time zone: UTC+3:00

Kamenka (Russian: Каменка) is a rural locality (a khutor) in Starovedugskoye Rural Settlement, Semiluksky District, Voronezh Oblast, Russia. The population was 120 as of 2010. There are 2 streets.

== Geography ==
Kamenka is located 57 km northwest of Semiluki (the district's administrative centre) by road. Staraya Veduga is the nearest rural locality.
