= Kamenka, Aurgazinsky District, Republic of Bashkortostan =

Kamenka Каменка
- Village
- Location within Bashkortostan Location within Russia
- Coordinates: 53°48′N 55°47′E
- Country: Russia
- Region: Bashkortostan
- District: Aurgazinsky District
- Time zone: UTC+5:00

Kamenka (Russian: Каменка) is a rural locality (a village) in Meselinsky Selsoviet, Aurgazinsky District, Bashkortostan, Russia. The population was 66 as of 2010. There is 1 street.

== Geography ==
Kamenka is located 33 km south of Tolbazy (the district's administrative centre) by road. Krasny Vostok is the nearest rural locality.
