= Zhuravlyovka, Republic of Bashkortostan =

Zhuravlyovka Журавлёвка
- Village
- Location within Bashkortostan Location within Russia
- Coordinates: 53°51′N 55°51′E
- Country: Russia
- Region: Bashkortostan
- District: Aurgazinsky District
- Time zone: UTC+5:00

Zhuravlyovka (Russian: Журавлёвка) is a rural locality (a village) in Meselinsky Selsoviet, Aurgazinsky District, Bashkortostan, Russia. The population was 19 as of 2010. There is 1 street.

== Geography ==
Zhuravlyovka is located 33 km south of Tolbazy (the district's administrative centre) by road. Meseli is the nearest rural locality.
