= Kamenka, Alexandrovsky District, Vladimir Oblast =

Kamenka Каменка
- Village
- Location within Vladimir Oblast Location within Russia
- Coordinates: 56°18′N 38°28′E
- Country: Russia
- Region: Vladimir Oblast
- District: Alexandrovsky District
- Time zone: UTC+3:00

Kamenka (Russian: Каменка) is a rural locality (a village) in Karinskoye Rural Settlement, Alexandrovsky District, Vladimir Oblast, Russia. The population was 9 as of 2010. There are 2 streets.

== Geography ==
The village is located 17 km south-west from Bolshoye Karinskoye, 21 km south-west from Alexandrov.
