= Kamenka, Mazanovsky District, Amur Oblast =

Kamenka Каменка
- Selo
- Location within Amur Oblast Location within Russia
- Coordinates: 51°33′N 128°41′E
- Country: Russia
- Region: Amur Oblast
- District: Mazanovsky District
- Time zone: UTC+9:00

Kamenka (Russian: Каменка) is a rural locality (a selo) in Beloyarovsky Selsoviet of Mazanovsky District, Amur Oblast, Russia. The population was 11 as of 2018. There are 3 streets.

== Geography ==
Kamenka is located 69 km southeast of Novokiyevsky Uval (the district's administrative centre) by road.
