= Kamenka, Brasovsky District, Bryansk Oblast =

Kamenka Каменка
- Settlement
- Location within Bryansk Oblast Location within Russia
- Coordinates: 52°29′N 34°31′E
- Country: Russia
- Region: Bryansk Oblast
- District: Brasovsky District
- Time zone: UTC+3:00

Kamenka (Russian: Каменка) is a rural locality (a settlement) in Brasovsky District, Bryansk Oblast, Russia. The population was 1,734 as of 2013.

== Geography ==
Kamenka is located 12 km southwest of Lokot (the district's administrative centre) by road. Trostnaya is the nearest rural locality.
