= Kamenka, Bizhbulyaksky District, Republic of Bashkortostan =

Kamenka Каменка
- Selo
- Location within Bashkortostan Location within Russia
- Coordinates: 53°35′N 53°59′E
- Country: Russia
- Region: Bashkortostan
- District: Bizhbulyaksky District
- Time zone: UTC+5:00

Kamenka (Russian: Каменка) is a rural locality (a selo) and the administrative centre of Kamensky Selsoviet, Bizhbulyaksky District, Bashkortostan, Russia. The population was 512 as of 2010. There are 8 streets.

== Geography ==
Kamenka is located 28 km southwest of Bizhbulyak (the district's administrative centre) by road. Progress is the nearest rural locality.
