= Vtoraya Kamenka =

Vtoraya Kamenka Вторая Каменка
- Selo
- Location within Altai Krai Location within Russia
- Coordinates: 51°03′N 81°45′E
- Country: Russia
- Region: Altai Krai
- District: Loktevsky District
- Time zone: UTC+7:00

Vtoraya Kamenka (Russian: Вторая Каменка) is a rural locality (a selo) and the administrative center of Vtorokamensky Selsoviet, Loktevsky District, Altai Krai, Russia. The population was 707 as of 2013. There are 6 streets.

== Geography ==
Vtoraya Kamenka is located on the Kamenka River, 27 km northeast of Gornyak (the district's administrative centre) by road. Mezhdurechye is the nearest rural locality.
