= Kamenka, Yuryev-Polsky District, Vladimir Oblast =

Kamenka Каменка
- Selo
- Location within Vladimir Oblast Location within Russia
- Coordinates: 56°40′N 39°22′E
- Country: Russia
- Region: Vladimir Oblast
- District: Yuryev-Polsky District
- Time zone: UTC+3:00

Kamenka (Russian: Каменка) is a rural locality (a selo) in Simskoye Rural Settlement, Yuryev-Polsky District, Vladimir Oblast, Russia. The population was 85 as of 2010.

== Geography ==
Kamenka is located on the Shosa River, 37 km northwest of Yuryev-Polsky (the district's administrative centre) by road. Maymor is the nearest rural locality.
