= Dyakonovsky 2-y =

Dyakonovsky 2-y Дьяконовский 2-й
- Khutor
- Location within Volgograd Oblast Location within Russia
- Coordinates: 50°45′N 42°04′E
- Country: Russia
- Region: Volgograd Oblast
- District: Uryupinsky District
- Time zone: UTC+4:00

Dyakonovsky 2-y (Russian: Дьяконовский 2-й) is a rural locality (a khutor) and the administrative center of Dyakonovskoye Rural Settlement, Uryupinsky District, Volgograd Oblast, Russia. The population was 904 as of 2010. There are 10 streets.

== Geography ==
Dyakonovsky 2-y is located in steppe, 8 km southeast of Uryupinsk (the district's administrative centre) by road. Kamenka is the nearest rural locality.
