= Kamenka, Melenkovsky District, Vladimir Oblast =

Kamenka Каменка
- Village
- Location within Vladimir Oblast Location within Russia
- Coordinates: 55°16′N 41°17′E
- Country: Russia
- Region: Vladimir Oblast
- District: Melenkovsky District
- Time zone: UTC+3:00

Kamenka (Russian: Каменка) is a rural locality (a village) in Danilovskoye Rural Settlement, Melenkovsky District, Vladimir Oblast, Russia. The population was 13 as of 2010.

== Geography ==
Kamenka is located on the Kamenka River, 37 km (23 mi) southwest of Melenki (the district's administrative centre) by road. Mildevo is the nearest rural locality.
