= Kamenka, Zabaykalsky Krai =

Kamenka Каменка
- Settlement
- Location within Zabaykalsky Krai Location within Russia
- Coordinates: 51°52′N 113°39′E
- Country: Russia
- Region: Zabaykalsky Krai
- District: Chitinsky District
- Time zone: UTC+9:00

Kamenka (Russian: Каменка) is a rural locality (a settlement) in Chitinsky District, Zabaykalsky Krai, Russia. Population: 12 (2021 census); 93 (2010 census); There are 2 streets in this settlement.

== Geography ==
This rural locality is located 21 km from Chita (the district's administrative centre and capital of Zabaykalsky Krai) and 5,238 km from Moscow. Atamanovka is the nearest rural locality.
