= Kamenka, Oktyabrsky District, Volgograd Oblast =

Kamenka Каменка
- Selo
- Location within Volgograd Oblast Location within Russia
- Coordinates: 47°59′N 43°48′E
- Country: Russia
- Region: Volgograd Oblast
- District: Oktyabrsky District
- Time zone: UTC+4:00

Kamenka (Russian: Каменка) is a rural locality (a selo) in Kovalyovskoye Rural Settlement, Oktyabrsky District, Volgograd Oblast, Russia. The population was 129 as of 2010. There are 3 streets.

== Geography ==
The village is located in steppe, on Yergeni, 150 km from Volgograd, 23 km from Oktyabrsky, 9 km from Zhutovo-1.
