= Kamenka, Povorinsky District, Voronezh Oblast =

Kamenka Каменка
- Selo
- Location within Voronezh Oblast Location within Russia
- Coordinates: 51°19′N 42°45′E
- Country: Russia
- Region: Voronezh Oblast
- District: Povorinsky District
- Time zone: UTC+3:00

Kamenka (Russian: Каменка) is a rural locality (a selo) in Baychurovskoye Rural Settlement, Povorinsky District, Voronezh Oblast, Russia. The population was 397 as of 2010. There are 3 streets.

== Geography ==
Kamenka is located 48 km northeast of Povorino (the district's administrative centre) by road. Baychurovo is the nearest rural locality.
