= Kamenka, Alsheyevsky District, Republic of Bashkortostan =

Kamenka Каменка
- Village
- Location within Bashkortostan Location within Russia
- Coordinates: 53°50′N 54°54′E
- Country: Russia
- Region: Bashkortostan
- District: Alsheyevsky District
- Time zone: UTC+5:00

Kamenka (Russian: Каменка) is a rural locality (a village) in Chebenlinsky Selsoviet, Alsheyevsky District, Bashkortostan, Russia. The population was 54 as of 2010. There is 1 street.

== Geography ==
Kamenka is located 38 km south of Rayevsky (the district's administrative centre) by road. Abishevo is the nearest rural locality.
