= Kamenka, Vorobyovsky District, Voronezh Oblast =

Kamenka Каменка
- Selo
- Location within Voronezh Oblast Location within Russia
- Coordinates: 50°37′N 40°39′E
- Country: Russia
- Region: Voronezh Oblast
- District: Vorobyovsky District
- Time zone: UTC+3:00

Kamenka (Russian: Каменка) is a rural locality (a selo) in Solonetskoye Rural Settlement, Vorobyovsky District, Voronezh Oblast, Russia. The population was 307 as of 2010. There are 7 streets.

== Geography ==
Kamenka is located 25 km west of Vorobyovka (the district's administrative centre) by road. Solontsy is the nearest rural locality.
