= Kamenka, Verkhovazhsky District, Vologda Oblast =

Kamenka Каменка
- Settlement
- Location within Vologda Oblast Location within Russia
- Coordinates: 60°27′N 41°46′E
- Country: Russia
- Region: Vologda Oblast
- District: Verkhovazhsky District
- Time zone: UTC+3:00

Kamenka (Russian: Каменка) is a rural locality (a settlement) in Chushevitskoye Rural Settlement, Verkhovazhsky District, Vologda Oblast, Russia. The population was 560 as of 2002. There are 8 streets.

== Geography ==
Kamenka is located 49 km southwest of Verkhovazhye (the district's administrative centre) by road. Podsosenye is the nearest rural locality.
