= Suksun =

Suksun Суксун
- Urban-type settlement
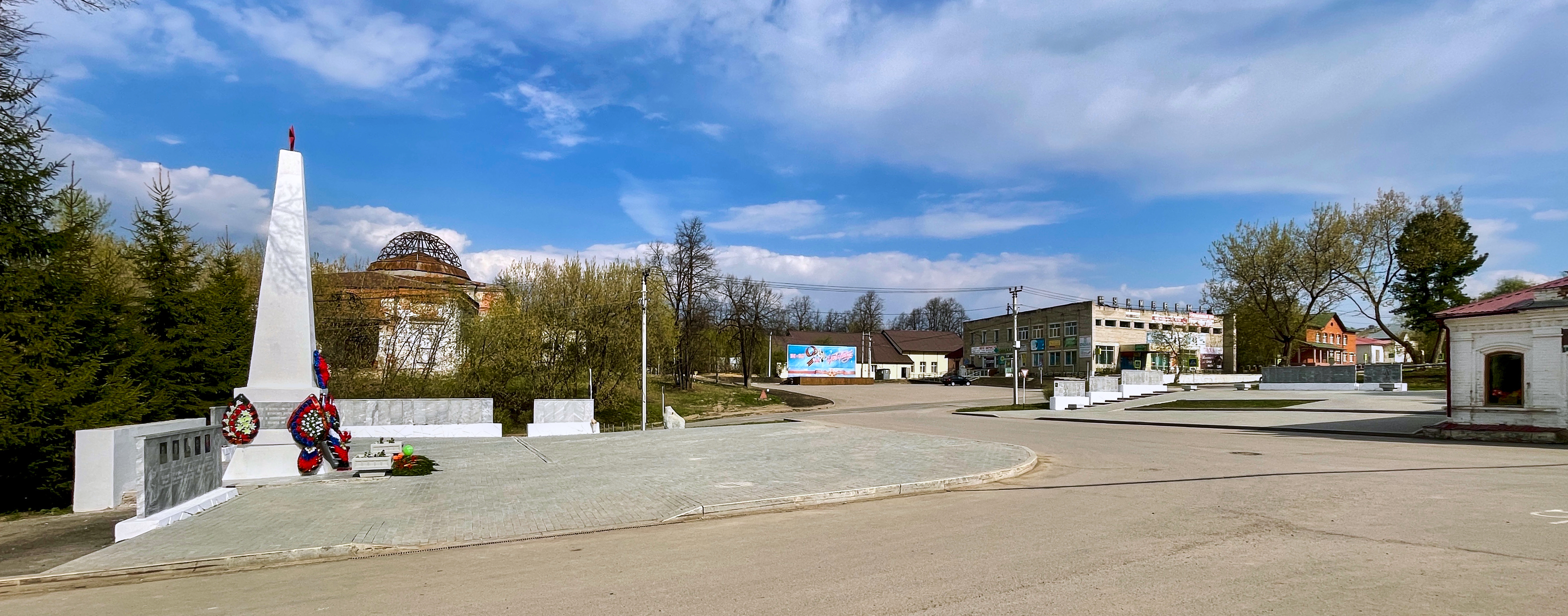
- Main square and war memorial, Suksun

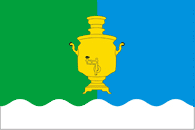
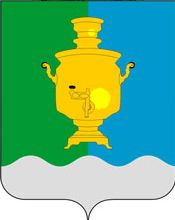
- Flag Coat of arms
- Interactive map of Suksun
- Location of Suksun Suksun (Perm Krai)
- Coordinates: 57°09′N 57°23′E
- Country: Russia
- Federal subject: Perm Krai
- Administrative district: Suksunsky District
- Founded: 1651

Population (2010 Census)
  - Total: 8,022
  - Estimate (2023): 8,298 (+3.4%)
- Time zone: UTC+5 (MSK+2)
- Postal code: 617560
- OKTMO ID: 57731000051

Suksun (Russian: Суксун) is an urban locality (a work settlement) and the administrative center of Suksunsky District of Perm Krai, Russia, located on the left bank of the Sylva River (a tributary of the Chusovaya River), 150 kilometers (93 mi) from the city of Perm. Population: 8,022 (2010 census); 8,495 (2002 census); 8,882 (1989 Soviet census).

== Etymology ==
The name is of Turkic origin and means cold water.

== History ==
Suksun was first mentioned as a settlement in 1651. The town grew around the copper smelting and iron works plant built by Akinfiy Demidov in 1727–1729. Urban-type settlement status was granted to it on June 20, 1933.

In the mid 18th century, due to the presence of copper, the town became known for the production of copper utensils and Samovars. While copper is no longer mined in Suksun, Samovars are still being manufactured there.
