= Suksunsky District =

Suksunsky District Суксунский район (Russian)
- District
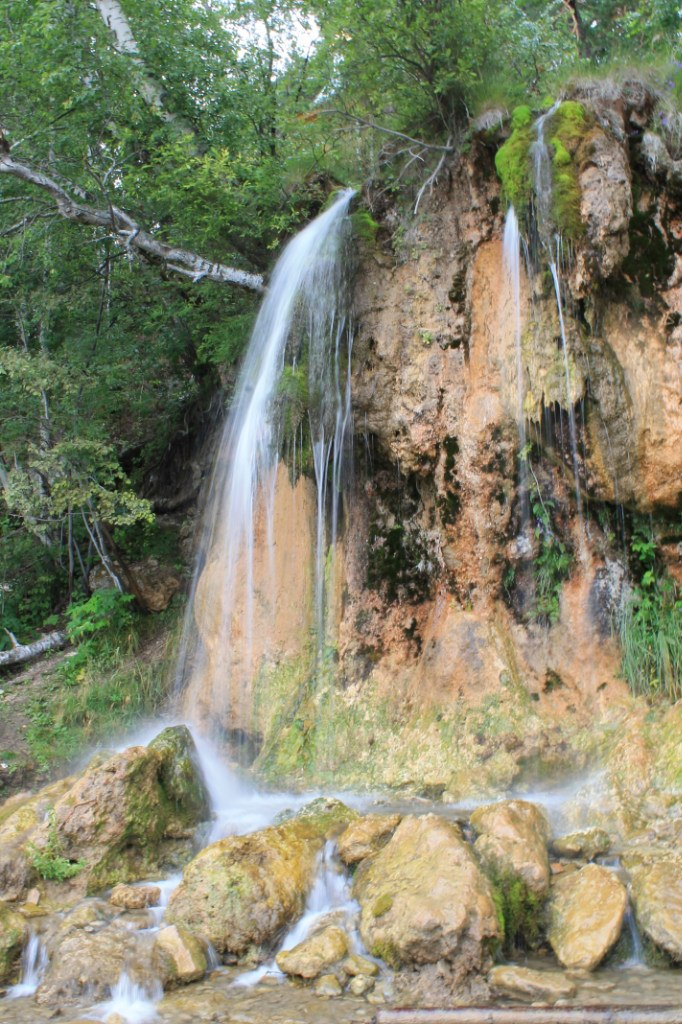
- Plakun Waterfall, a protected area of Russia in Suksunsky District

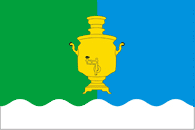
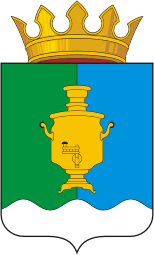
- Flag Coat of arms
- Location of Suksunsky District in Perm Krai
- Coordinates: 57.068°N 57.546°E
- Country: Russia
- Federal subject: Perm Krai
- Established: February 27, 1924 (first), 1935 (second), 1964 (third)
- Administrative center: Suksun

Area
  - Total: 1,977 km^{2} (763 sq mi)

Population (2010 Census)
  - Total: 20,099
  - Density: 10.17/km^{2} (26.33/sq mi)
  - Urban: 39.9%
  - Rural: 60.1%

Administrative structure
  - Inhabited localities: 1 urban-type settlements, 62 rural localities

Municipal structure
  - Municipally incorporated as: Suksunsky Municipal District
  - Municipal divisions: 1 urban settlements, 3 rural settlements
- Time zone: UTC+5 (MSK+2)
- OKTMO ID: 57651000
- Website: http://www.suksun.ru

Suksunsky District (Russian: Суксунский райо́н) is an administrative district (raion) of Perm Krai, Russia; one of the thirty-three in the krai. Municipally, it is incorporated as Suksunsky Municipal District. It is located in the southeast of the krai. The area of the district is 1,977 square kilometers (763 sq mi). Its administrative center is the urban locality (a work settlement) of Suksun. Population: 20,099 (2010 census); 21,925 (2002 census); 23,654 (1989 Soviet census). The population of Suksun accounts for 39.9% of the district's total population.

== History ==
The district was established on February 27, 1924, but was abolished between 1932 and 1935 and then again between 1963 and 1964.

== Demographics ==
Ethnic composition (as of the 2002 Census):

- Russians: 83.4%
- Tatars: 8%
- Mari people: 6.9%

== Sources ==
- Законодательное собрание Пермской области. Закон №416-67 от 28 февраля 1996 г. «Об административно-территориальном устройстве Пермского края», в ред. Закона №504-ПК от 9 июля 2015 г. «О внесении изменений в Закон Пермской области "Об административно-территориальном устройстве Пермского края"». Вступил в силу с момента опубликования. Опубликован: "Звезда", №38, 12 марта 1996 г. (Legislative Assembly of Perm Oblast. Law #416-67 of February 28, 1996 On the Administrative-Territorial Structure of Perm Krai, as amended by the Law #504-PK of July 9, 2015 On Amending the Law of Perm Oblast "On the Administrative-Territorial Structure of Perm Krai". Effective as of the moment of publication.).
- Законодательное собрание Пермской области. Закон №1719-349 от 10 ноября 2004 г. «Об утверждении границ и о наделении статусом муниципальных образований Суксунского района Пермского края», в ред. Закона №542-ПК от 6 октября 2015 г. «О внесении изменений в Закон Пермской области "Об утверждении границ и о наделении статусом муниципальных образований Суксунского района Пермского края"». Вступил в силу через десять дней со дня официального опубликования. Опубликован: "Бюллетень Законодательного Собрания и администрации Пермской области", №12, I часть, 9 декабря 2004 г. (Legislative Assembly of Perm Oblast. Law #1719-349 of November 10, 2004 On Establishing the Borders and on Granting the Status to the Municipal Formations of Suksunsky District of Perm Krai, as amended by the Law #542-PK of October 6, 2015 On Amending the Law of Perm Oblast "On Establishing the Borders and on Granting the Status to the Municipal Formations of Suksunsky District of Perm Krai". Effective as of the day which is ten days following the day of the official publication.).
