= Staroaleyskoye =

Rural locality in Tretyakovsky District, Russia

Coordinates: 51°00′N 82°00′E

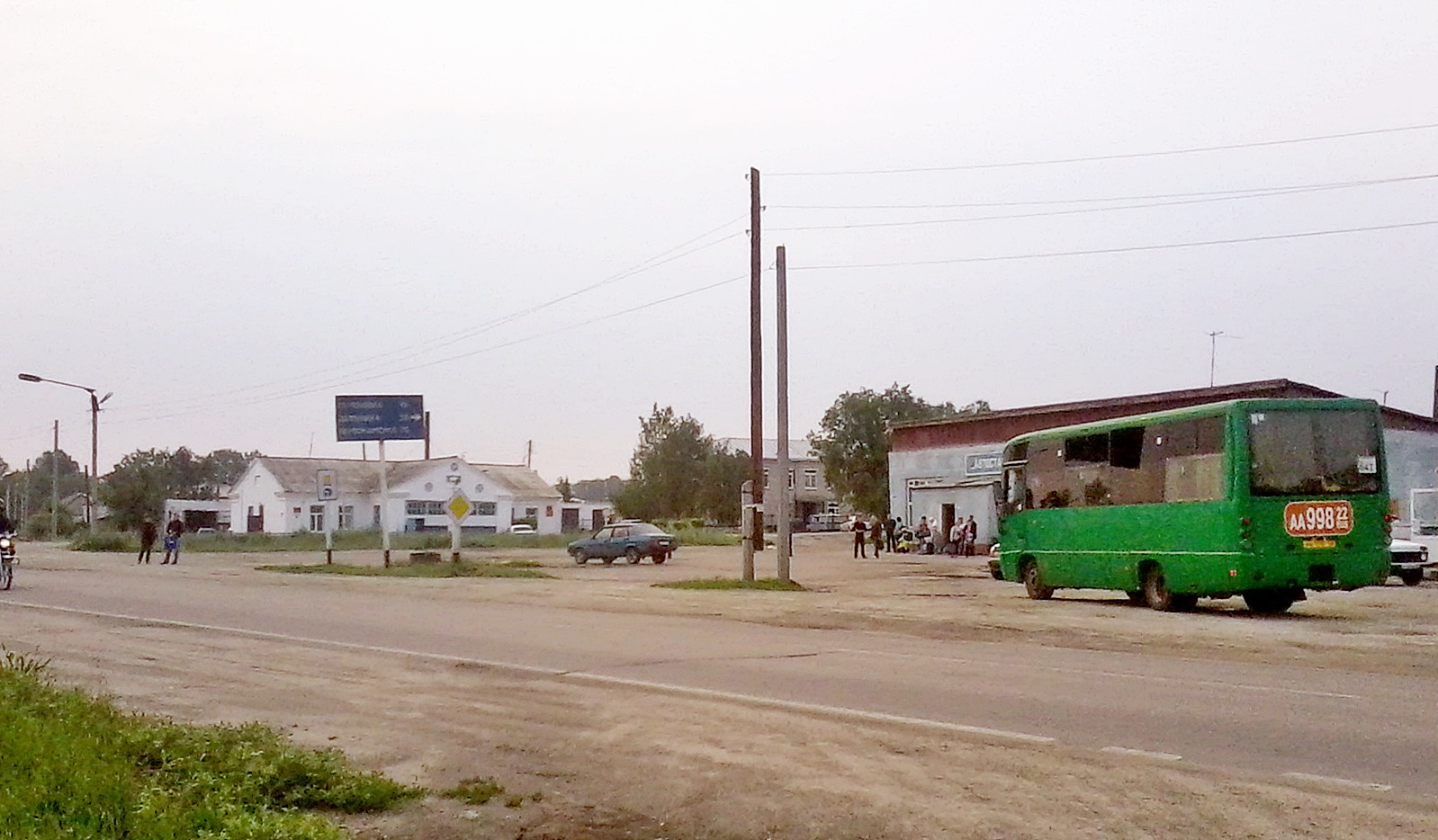
Bus station

Staroaleyskoye (Russian: Староалейское) is a rural locality (a selo) and the administrative center of Tretyakovsky District of Altai Krai, Russia. Population: 4,769 (2010 census); 5,002 (2002 census); 4,594 (1989 Soviet census).
