= Kurya, Kuryinsky District, Altai Krai =

Kurya Курья
- Selo
- Interactive map of Kurya
- Location of Kurya Kurya (Altai Krai)
- Coordinates: 51°36′06″N 82°17′22″E
- Country: Russia
- Federal subject: Altai Krai
- Administrative district: Kuryinsky District
- SelsovietSelsoviet: Kuryinsky Selsoviet
- Founded: 1749

Population (2010 Census)
  - Total: 3,835
  - Estimate (2025): 3,305 (−13.8%)

Administrative status
  - Capital of: Kuryinsky District, Kuryinsky Selsoviet

Municipal status
  - Municipal district: Kuryinsky Municipal District
  - Rural settlement: Kuryinsky Selsoviet Rural Settlement
  - Capital of: Kuryinsky Municipal District, Kuryinsky Selsoviet Rural Settlement
- Time zone: UTC+7 (MSK+4)
- Postal code: 658320
- OKTMO ID: 01623466101

Kurya (Russian: Курья) is a rural locality (a selo) and the administrative center of Kuryinsky District of Altai Krai, Russia. Population: 3,835 (2010 census); 4,292 (2002 census); 4,394 (1989 Soviet census).

It is the place of birth of Mikhail Kalashnikov. In November 2013 a museum dedicated to him was opened in the town, in a century-old wooden school house where Kalashnikov used to study. Kalashnikov, who turned 94 years old at the time of the opening, said he was unable to attend the opening ceremony due to poor health (he died only the following month). Kalashnikov had donated numerous personal items to the museum, including an honorary professor's robe from Harvard University and a letter from late Venezuelan President, Hugo Chavez, who traveled to Russia in 2009 to personally congratulate Kalashnikov on his 90th birthday.
