= Tretyakovsky District =

Tretyakovsky District Третьяковский район (Russian)
- District
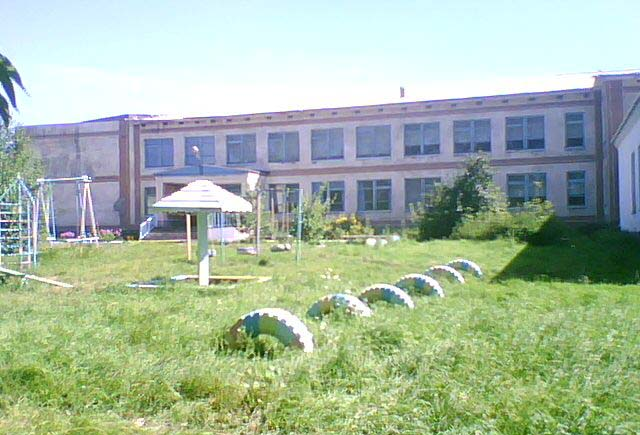
- Tretyakov High School, Tretyakovsky District
- Location of Tretyakovsky District in Altai Krai
- Coordinates: 51°N 82°E
- Country: Russia
- Federal subject: Altai Krai
- Established: 1944
- Administrative center: Staroaleyskoye

Area
  - Total: 1,998 km^{2} (771 sq mi)

Population (2010 Census)
  - Total: 14,197
  - Density: 7.106/km^{2} (18.40/sq mi)
  - Urban: 0%
  - Rural: 100%

Administrative structure
  - Administrative divisions: 9 selsoviet
  - Inhabited localities: 23 rural localities

Municipal structure
  - Municipally incorporated as: Tretyakovsky Municipal District
  - Municipal divisions: 0 urban settlements, 9 rural settlements
- Time zone: UTC+7 (MSK+4)
- OKTMO ID: 01650000
- Website: http://третьяковский-район.рф/

Tretyakovsky District (Russian: Третьяко́вский райо́н) is an administrative and municipal district (raion), one of the fifty-nine in Altai Krai, Russia. It is located in the south of the krai. The area of the district is 1,998 square kilometers (771 sq mi). Its administrative center is the rural locality (a selo) of Staroaleyskoye. Population: 14,197 (2010 census); 16,787 (2002 census); 15,408 (1989 Soviet census). The population of Staroaleyskoye accounts for 33.6% of the district's total population.
