= Kuryinsky District =

Kuryinsky District Курьинский район (Russian)
- District
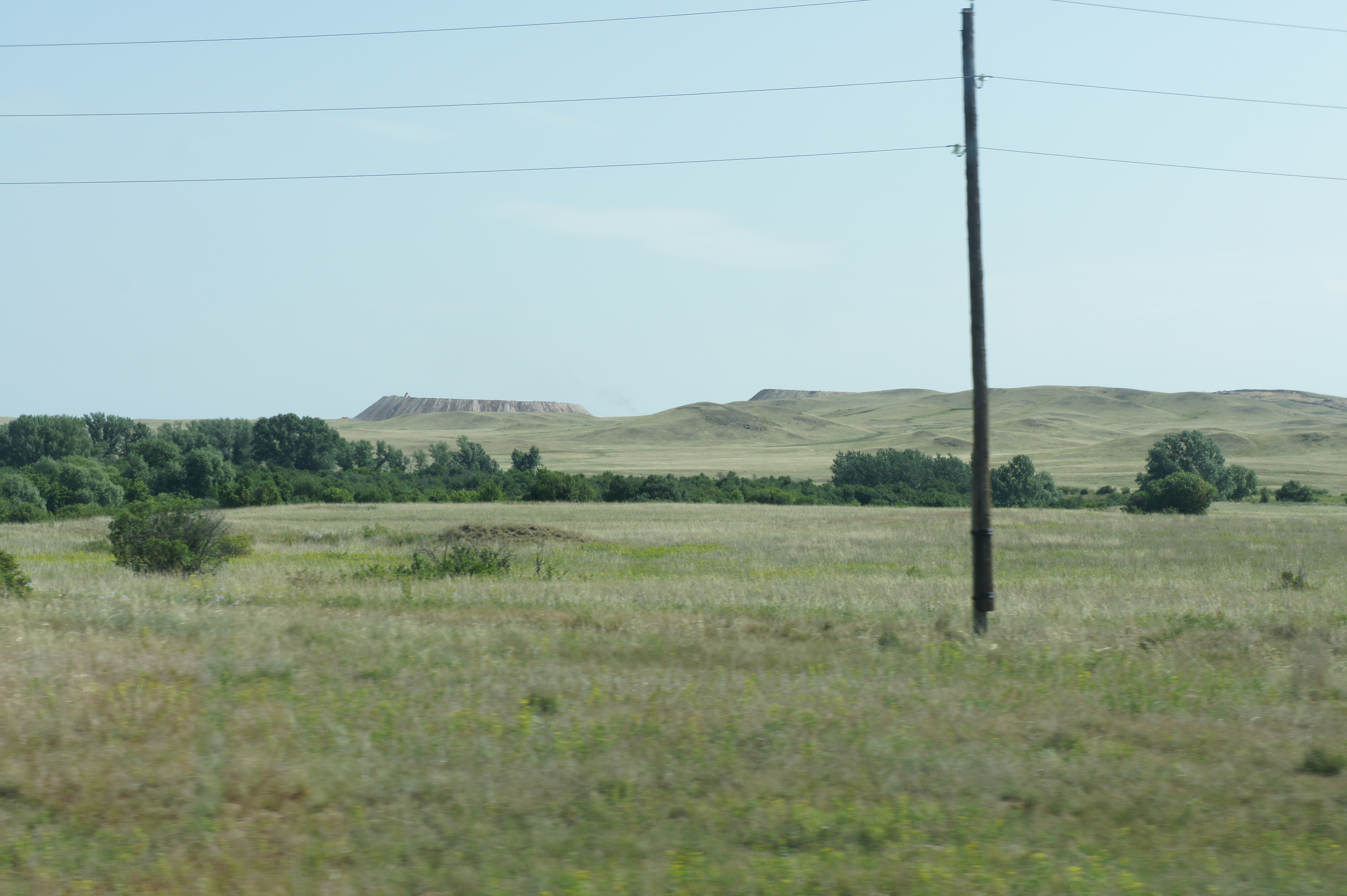
- A gold mine near the selo of Novofirsovo in Kuryinsky District

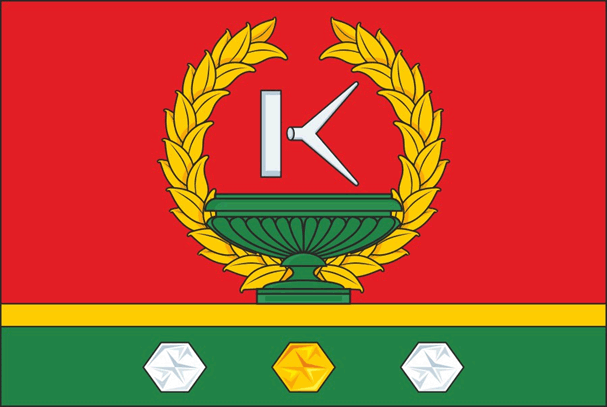
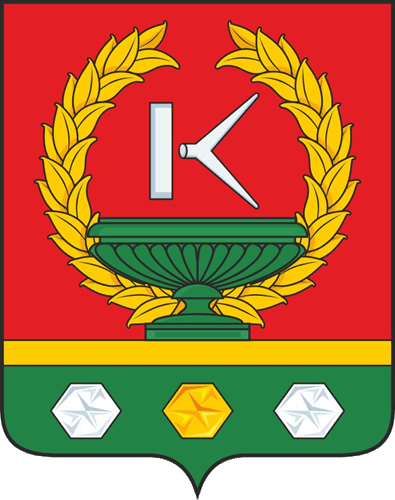
- Flag Coat of arms
- Location of Kuryinsky District in Altai Krai
- Coordinates: 51°36′N 82°18′E
- Country: Russia
- Federal subject: Altai Krai
- Established: 1924
- Administrative center: Kurya

Area
  - Total: 2,500 km^{2} (970 sq mi)

Population (2010 Census)
  - Total: 11,079
  - Density: 4.4/km^{2} (11/sq mi)
  - Urban: 0%
  - Rural: 100%

Administrative structure
  - Administrative divisions: 10 selsoviet
  - Inhabited localities: 22 rural localities

Municipal structure
  - Municipally incorporated as: Kuryinsky Municipal District
  - Municipal divisions: 0 urban settlements, 10 rural settlements
- Time zone: UTC+7 (MSK+4)
- OKTMO ID: 01623000
- Website: https://kurya.ru/

Kuryinsky District (Russian: Курьи́нский райо́н) is an administrative and municipal district (raion), one of the fifty-nine in Altai Krai, Russia. It is located in the south of the krai. The area of the district is 2,500 square kilometers (970 sq mi). Its administrative center is the rural locality (a selo) of Kurya. Population: 11,079 (2010 census); 13,492 (2002 census); 14,012 (1989 Soviet census). The population of Kurya accounts for 34.6% of the district's total population.
