= Arkhara =

Arkhara Архара
- Settlement
- Interactive map of Arkhara
- Location of Arkhara Arkhara (Amur Oblast)
- Coordinates: 49°25′00″N 130°05′00″E
- Country: Russia
- Federal subject: Amur Oblast
- Founded: 1911
- Elevation: 161 m (528 ft)

Population (2010 Census)
  - Total: 9,585
  - Estimate (2023): 7,580 (−20.9%)

Administrative status
  - Subordinated to: Arkharinsky District
- Time zone: UTC+9 (MSK+6)
- Postal code: 676740–676742
- OKTMO ID: 10605151051

Arkhara (Russian: Архара́) is an urban-type settlement and the administrative center of the Arkharinsky District in Amur Oblast, Russia. It is located at the junction of the Transbaikal Railway and the Far Eastern Railway. The Arkhara River flows near the town. Population: 9,585 (2010 census); 10,847 (2002 census);

== Climate ==
Arkhara has a typical Amur basin extreme dry-winter humid continental climate (Köppen Dwb) featuring frigid, dry winters alongside very warm, humid and wet summers.

Climate data for Arkhara (1991–2020, extremes 1936–present)
Month	Jan	Feb	Mar	Apr	May	Jun	Jul	Aug	Sep	Oct	Nov	Dec	Year
Record high °C (°F)	−4.9 (23.2)	4.2 (39.6)	19.8 (67.6)	30.5 (86.9)	34.1 (93.4)	37.1 (98.8)	35.7 (96.3)	34.1 (93.4)	31.6 (88.9)	27.0 (80.6)	14.3 (57.7)	2.6 (36.7)	37.1 (98.8)
Mean daily maximum °C (°F)	−18.1 (−0.6)	−11.7 (10.9)	−1.4 (29.5)	10.9 (51.6)	19.4 (66.9)	24.3 (75.7)	26.9 (80.4)	24.9 (76.8)	19.1 (66.4)	9.3 (48.7)	−5.2 (22.6)	−16.7 (1.9)	6.8 (44.2)
Daily mean °C (°F)	−24.9 (−12.8)	−19.4 (−2.9)	−8.4 (16.9)	4.4 (39.9)	12.6 (54.7)	18.1 (64.6)	21.4 (70.5)	19.2 (66.6)	12.3 (54.1)	2.8 (37.0)	−11.1 (12.0)	−23.0 (−9.4)	0.3 (32.6)
Mean daily minimum °C (°F)	−31.3 (−24.3)	−27.2 (−17.0)	−15.9 (3.4)	−1.8 (28.8)	5.7 (42.3)	12.1 (53.8)	16.4 (61.5)	14.1 (57.4)	6.3 (43.3)	−3.0 (26.6)	−16.6 (2.1)	−28.9 (−20.0)	−5.8 (21.5)
Record low °C (°F)	−47.3 (−53.1)	−43.9 (−47.0)	−37.1 (−34.8)	−20.8 (−5.4)	−9.3 (15.3)	−0.8 (30.6)	3.2 (37.8)	2.6 (36.7)	−7.9 (17.8)	−26.2 (−15.2)	−38.5 (−37.3)	−44.8 (−48.6)	−47.3 (−53.1)
Average precipitation mm (inches)	9 (0.4)	7 (0.3)	14 (0.6)	34 (1.3)	66 (2.6)	93 (3.7)	143 (5.6)	129 (5.1)	74 (2.9)	38 (1.5)	19 (0.7)	15 (0.6)	641 (25.3)
Source: Pogoda.ru.net
