= Arkharinsky District =

Arkharinsky District Архаринский район (Russian)
- District
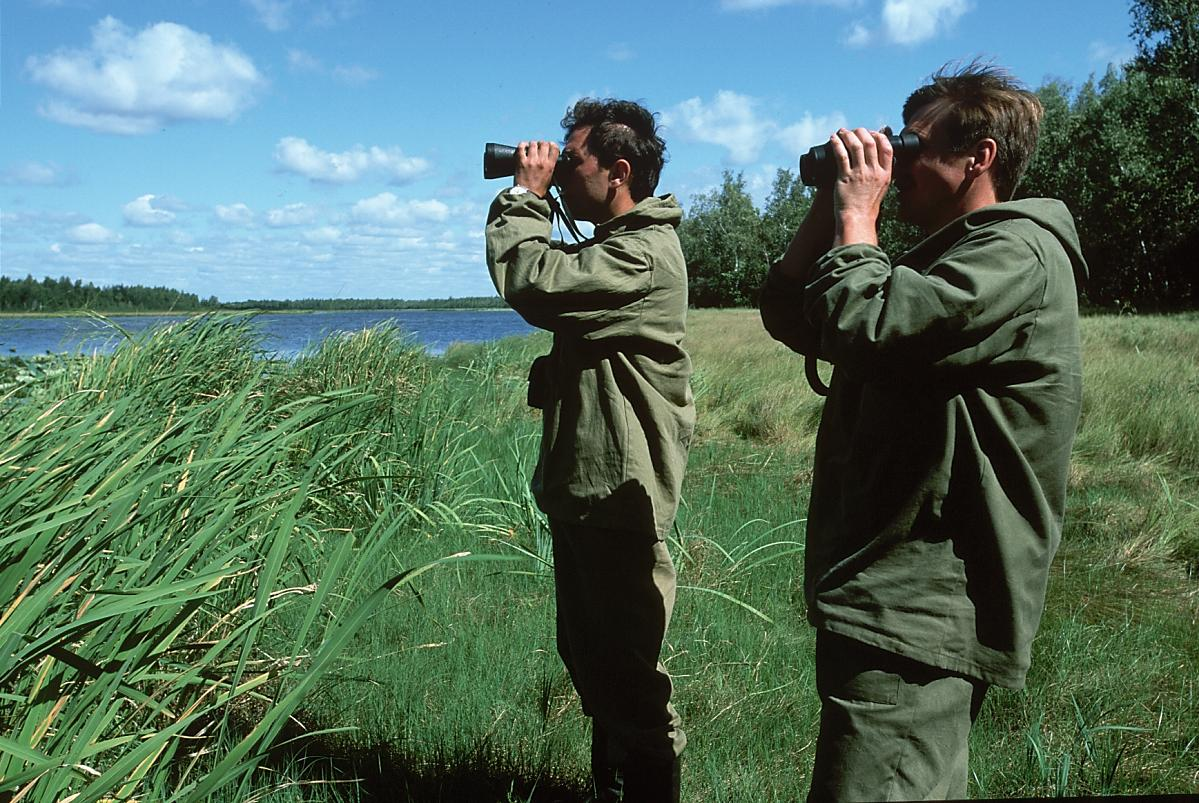
- Khingansky Nature Reserve in Arkharinsky District

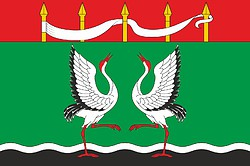
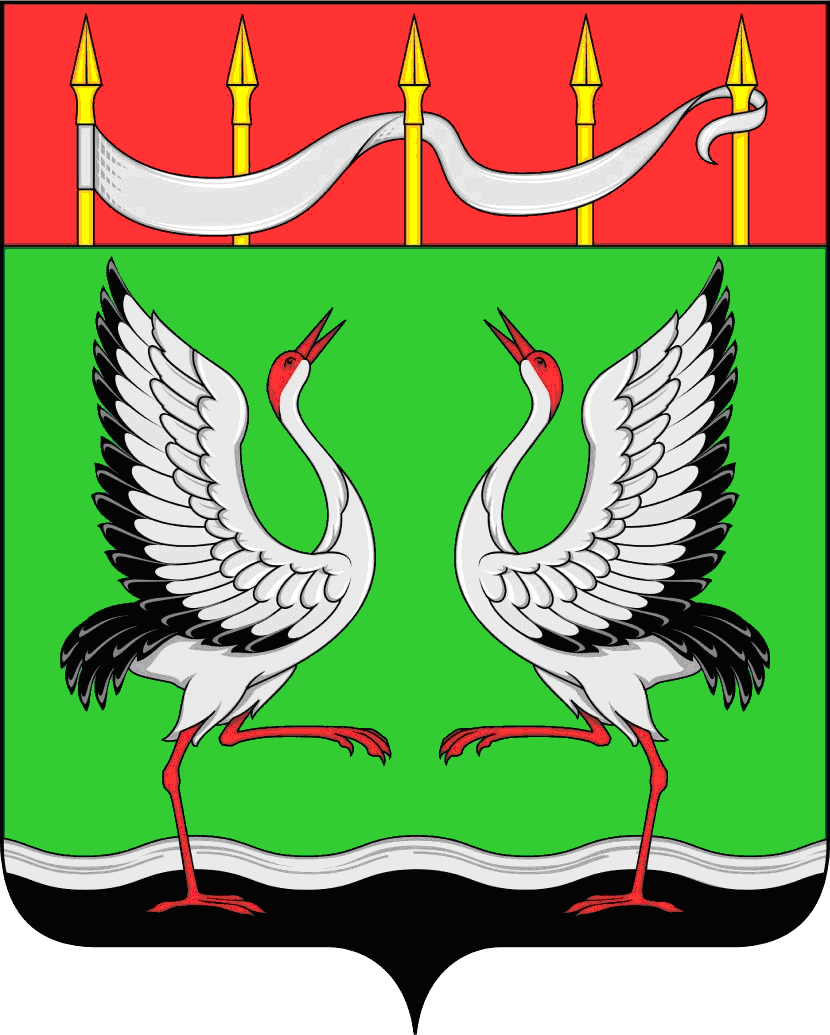
- Flag Coat of arms
- Location of Arkharinsky District in Amur Oblast
- Coordinates: 49°25′32″N 130°04′41″E
- Country: Russia
- Federal subject: Amur Oblast
- Established: 4 January 1926
- Administrative center: Arkhara

Area
  - Total: 14,355 km^{2} (5,542 sq mi)

Population (2010 Census)
  - Total: 17,186
  - Density: 1.1972/km^{2} (3.1008/sq mi)
  - Urban: 55.8%
  - Rural: 44.2%

Administrative structure
  - Administrative divisions: 1 Urban settlements, 15 Rural settlements
  - Inhabited localities: 1 urban-type settlements, 48 rural localities

Municipal structure
  - Municipally incorporated as: Arkharinsky Municipal District
  - Municipal divisions: 1 urban settlements, 15 rural settlements
- Time zone: UTC+9 (MSK+6)
- OKTMO ID: 10605000
- Website: http://www.arh-adm.ru/

Arkharinsky District (Russian: Архари́нский райо́н) is an administrative and municipal district (raion), one of the twenty in Amur Oblast, Russia. The area of the district is 14,355 square kilometers (5,542 sq mi). Its administrative center is the urban locality (a work settlement) of Arkhara. Population: 17,186 (2010 census); 21,068 (2002 Census); 27,537 (1989 Soviet census). The population of Arkhara accounts for 55.8% of the district's total population.

== Geography ==
There is a wide floodplain by the Amur River in the district, to the northeast there is a terraced lowland plain, followed by the hills and plains of the Arkhara River basin, a tributary of the Amur River. To the north rises the southern end of the Turan Range.
