= Samsonovo (disambiguation) =

Samsonovo (Russian: Самсоново), rural localities in Russia, may refer to:

- Samsonovo, Altai Krai, a selo
- Samsonovo, Arkhangelsk Oblast, a village
- Samsonovo, Ivanovo Oblast, a village
- Samsonovo, Kaluga Oblast, a village
- Samsonovo, Kursk Oblast, a village
- Samsonovo, Omsk Oblast, a selo
- Samsonovo, Pskov Oblast, a village
- Samsonovo, Smolensk Oblast, a village
- Samsonovo, Toropetsky District, Tver Oblast, a village
- Samsonovo, Udomelsky District, Tver Oblast, a village
- Samsonovo, Vologda Oblast, a village

See also

- Samsonov
