= 2nd Pereverzevka =

Rural locality in Kursk Oblast, Russia

2nd Pereverzevka 2-я Переверзевка
- Village
- Interactive map of 2nd Pereverzevka
- Location of 2nd Pereverzevka 2nd Pereverzevka (Kursk Oblast)
- Coordinates: 51°26′51″N 35°54′28″E
- Country: Russia
- Federal subject: Kursk Oblast
- Administrative district: Medvensky District
- SelsovietSelsoviet: Vysoksky

Population (2010 Census)
  - Total: 14
  - Estimate (2010): 14 (0%)

Municipal status
  - Municipal district: Medvensky Municipal District
  - Rural settlement: Vysoksky Selsoviet Rural Settlement
- Time zone: UTC+3 (MSK)
- Postal code: 307040
- Dialing code: +7 47146
- OKTMO ID: 38624408136
- Website: visoksk.rkursk.ru

2nd Pereverzevka or Vtoraya Pereverzevka (Russian: 2-я Переверзевка, Вторая Переверзевка) is a rural locality (Russian: деревня, lit. 'village') in Vysoksky Selsoviet Rural Settlement, Medvensky District, Kursk Oblast, Russia. Population: 14 (2010 census); 22 (2002 census);

== Geography ==
The village is located on the Reut River (a left tributary of the Seym), 56 km (35 mi) from the Russia–Ukraine border, 34 km (21 mi) south-west of Kursk, 13 km (8.1 mi) north-west of the district center – the urban-type settlement Medvenka, 5 km (3.1 mi) from the selsoviet center – Vysokoye.

Climate

2nd Pereverzevka has a warm-summer humid continental climate (Dfb in the Köppen climate classification).

== Transport ==
2nd Pereverzevka is located 12 km (7.5 mi) from the federal route M-2 Crimea Highway (a part of the European route E105), on the road of intermunicipal significance 38H-061 (1st Gostomlya – Svidnoye – Spasskoye), 22.5 km (14.0 mi) from the nearest railway station Dyakonovo (railway line Lgov I — Kursk).

The rural locality is situated 43 km (27 mi) from Kursk Vostochny Airport, 100 km (62 mi) from Belgorod International Airport and 233 km (145 mi) from Voronezh Peter the Great Airport.
