= Svidnoye =

Rural locality in Kursk Oblast, Russia

Svidnoye Свидное
- Village
- Interactive map of Svidnoye
- Location of Svidnoye Svidnoye (Kursk Oblast)
- Coordinates: 51°27′01″N 35°52′57″E
- Country: Russia
- Federal subject: Kursk Oblast
- Administrative district: Medvensky District
- SelsovietSelsoviet: Gostomlyansky

Population (2010 Census)
  - Total: 121
  - Estimate (2010): 121 (0%)

Municipal status
  - Municipal district: Medvensky Municipal District
  - Rural settlement: Gostomlyansky Selsoviet Rural Settlement
- Time zone: UTC+3 (MSK)
- Postal code: 307041
- Dialing code: +7 47146
- OKTMO ID: 38624420121
- Website: gostomlja.ru

Svidnoye (Russian: Свидное) is a rural locality (Russian: деревня, lit. 'village') in Gostomlyansky Selsoviet Rural Settlement, Medvensky District, Kursk Oblast, Russia. Population: 121 (2010 census); 180 (2002 census);

== Geography ==
The village is located on the Reut River (a left tributary of the Seym), 56 km (35 mi) from the Russia–Ukraine border, 34.5 km (21.4 mi) south-west of Kursk, 15 km (9.3 mi) west of the district center – the urban-type settlement Medvenka, at the еаstern border of the selsoviet center – 1st Gostomlya.

Climate

Svidnoye has a warm-summer humid continental climate (Dfb in the Köppen climate classification).

== Transport ==
Svidnoye is located 13.5 km (8.4 mi) from the federal route M-2 Crimea Highway (a part of the European route E105), 8 km (5.0 mi) from the road of regional importance 38K-004 (Dyakonovo – Sudzha – border with Ukraine), 2 km (1.2 mi) from the road 38K-009 (M2 Crimea Highway – 38K-004), on the roads of intermunicipal significance 38H-202 (38K-009 – 2nd Gostomlya) and 38H-061 (1st Gostomlya – Svidnoye – Spasskoye), 21 km (13 mi) from the nearest railway halt 439 km (railway line Lgov I — Kursk).

The rural locality is situated 43.5 km (27.0 mi) from Kursk Vostochny Airport, 101 km (63 mi) from Belgorod International Airport and 235 km (146 mi) from Voronezh Peter the Great Airport.
