= Novoseledebny =

Rural locality in Kursk Oblast, Russia

Novoseledebny Новоселедебный
- Village
- Interactive map of Novoseledebny
- Location of Novoseledebny Novoseledebny (Kursk Oblast)
- Coordinates: 51°32′41″N 36°25′59″E
- Country: Russia
- Federal subject: Kursk Oblast
- Administrative district: Medvensky District
- SelsovietSelsoviet: Kitayevsky

Population (2010 Census)
  - Total: 8
  - Estimate (2010): 8 (0%)

Municipal status
  - Municipal district: Medvensky Municipal District
  - Rural settlement: Kitayevsky Selsoviet Rural Settlement
- Time zone: UTC+3 (MSK)
- Postal code: 307051
- Dialing code: +7 47146
- OKTMO ID: 38624424136
- Website: kitayss.rkursk.ru

Novoseledebny (Russian: Новоселедебный) is a rural locality (Russian: деревня, lit. 'village') in Kitayevsky Selsoviet Rural Settlement, Medvensky District, Kursk Oblast, Russia. Population: 8 (2010 census); 20 (2002 census);

== Geography ==
The village is located on the Polnaya River (a left tributary of the Seym), 91 km (57 mi) from the Russia–Ukraine border, 25 km (16 mi) south-east of Kursk, 25 km (16 mi) north-east of the district center – the urban-type settlement Medvenka, 9 km (5.6 mi) from the selsoviet center – 2nd Kitayevka.

Climate

Novoseledebny has a warm-summer humid continental climate (Dfb in the Köppen climate classification).

== Transport ==
Novoseledebny is located 24 km (15 mi) from the federal route M-2 Crimea Highway (a part of the European route E105), 2.5 km (1.6 mi) from the road of intermunicipal significance 38H-236 (M2 "Crimea Highway" – Polevaya), on the road 38H-237 (M2 "Crimea Highway" – Polny – 38N-236), 8.5 km (5.3 mi) from the nearest railway station Polevaya (railway line Klyukva — Belgorod).

The rural locality is situated 25 km (16 mi) from Kursk Vostochny Airport, 100 km (62 mi) from Belgorod International Airport and 196 km (122 mi) from Voronezh Peter the Great Airport.
