= Verkhnyaya Kamyshevka =

Rural locality in Kursk Oblast, Russia

Verkhnyaya Kamyshevka Верхняя Камышевка
- Khutor
- Interactive map of Verkhnyaya Kamyshevka
- Location of Verkhnyaya Kamyshevka Verkhnyaya Kamyshevka (Kursk Oblast)
- Coordinates: 51°29′40″N 36°22′00″E
- Country: Russia
- Federal subject: Kursk Oblast
- Administrative district: Medvensky District
- SelsovietSelsoviet: Kitayevsky

Population (2010 Census)
  - Total: 37
  - Estimate (2010): 37 (0%)

Municipal status
  - Municipal district: Medvensky Municipal District
  - Rural settlement: Kitayevsky Selsoviet Rural Settlement
- Time zone: UTC+3 (MSK)
- Postal code: 307052
- Dialing code: +7 47146
- OKTMO ID: 38624424156
- Website: kitayss.rkursk.ru

Verkhnyaya Kamyshevka (Russian: Верхняя Камышевка) is a rural locality (a khutor) in Kitayevsky Selsoviet Rural Settlement, Medvensky District, Kursk Oblast, Russia. Population: 37 (2010 census); 60 (2002 census);

== Geography ==
The khutor is located 83 km (52 mi) from the Russia–Ukraine border, 27.5 km (17.1 mi) south-east of Kursk, 17 km (11 mi) north-east of the district center – the urban-type settlement Medvenka, 1 km (0.62 mi) from the selsoviet center – 2nd Kitayevka.

Climate

Verkhnyaya Kamyshevka has a warm-summer humid continental climate (Dfb in the Köppen climate classification).

== Transport ==
Verkhnyaya Kamyshevka is located 16.5 km (10.3 mi) from the federal route M-2 Crimea Highway (a part of the European route E105), 6.5 km (4.0 mi) from the road of intermunicipal significance 38H-236 (M2 "Crimea Highway" – Polevaya), on the road 38H-237 (M2 "Crimea Highway" – Polny – 38N-236), 16 km (9.9 mi) from the nearest railway station Polevaya (railway line Klyukva — Belgorod).

The rural locality is situated 29 km (18 mi) from Kursk Vostochny Airport, 95 km (59 mi) from Belgorod International Airport and 201 km (125 mi) from Voronezh Peter the Great Airport.
