= Zybovka, Kursk Oblast =

Rural locality in Kursk Oblast, Russia

Zybovka Зыбовка
- Village
- Interactive map of Zybovka
- Location of Zybovka Zybovka (Kursk Oblast)
- Coordinates: 51°26′52″N 36°16′18″E
- Country: Russia
- Federal subject: Kursk Oblast
- Administrative district: Medvensky District
- SelsovietSelsoviet: Kitayevsky

Population (2010 Census)
  - Total: 59
  - Estimate (2010): 59 (0%)

Municipal status
  - Municipal district: Medvensky Municipal District
  - Rural settlement: Kitayevsky Selsoviet Rural Settlement
- Time zone: UTC+3 (MSK)
- Postal code: 307043
- Dialing code: +7 47146
- OKTMO ID: 38624424176
- Website: kitayss.rkursk.ru

Zybovka (Russian: Зыбовка) is a rural locality (Russian: деревня, lit. 'village') in Kitayevsky Selsoviet Rural Settlement, Medvensky District, Kursk Oblast, Russia. Population: 59 (2010 census); 83 (2002 census);

== Geography ==
The village is located in the Polnaya River basin (a left tributary of the Seym), 75 km (47 mi) from the Russia–Ukraine border, 30 km (19 mi) south-east of Kursk, 9.5 km (5.9 mi) north-east of the district center – the urban-type settlement Medvenka, 6.5 km (4.0 mi) from the selsoviet center – 2nd Kitayevka.

Climate

Zybovka has a warm-summer humid continental climate (Dfb in the Köppen climate classification).

== Transport ==
Zybovka is located 9.5 km (5.9 mi) from the federal route M-2 Crimea Highway (a part of the European route E105), 6.5 km (4.0 mi) from the road of intermunicipal significance 38H-236 (M2 "Crimea Highway" – Polevaya), on the road 38H-237 (M2 "Crimea Highway" – Polny – 38N-236), 23.5 km (14.6 mi) from the nearest railway halt Kolodnoye (railway line Klyukva — Belgorod).

The rural locality is situated 34 km (21 mi) from Kursk Vostochny Airport, 91 km (57 mi) from Belgorod International Airport and 209 km (130 mi) from Voronezh Peter the Great Airport.
