= Nizhnyaya Kamyshevka =

Rural locality in Kursk Oblast, Russia

Nizhnyaya Kamyshevka Нижняя Камышевка
- Khutor
- Interactive map of Nizhnyaya Kamyshevka
- Location of Nizhnyaya Kamyshevka Nizhnyaya Kamyshevka (Kursk Oblast)
- Coordinates: 51°30′05″N 36°22′43″E
- Country: Russia
- Federal subject: Kursk Oblast
- Administrative district: Medvensky District
- SelsovietSelsoviet: Kitayevsky

Population (2010 Census)
  - Total: 32
  - Estimate (2010): 32 (0%)

Municipal status
  - Municipal district: Medvensky Municipal District
  - Rural settlement: Kitayevsky Selsoviet Rural Settlement
- Time zone: UTC+3 (MSK)
- Postal code: 307052
- Dialing code: +7 47146
- OKTMO ID: 38624424206
- Website: kitayss.rkursk.ru

Nizhnyaya Kamyshevka (Russian: Нижняя Камышевка) is a rural locality (a khutor) in Kitayevsky Selsoviet Rural Settlement, Medvensky District, Kursk Oblast, Russia. Population: 32 (2010 census); 48 (2002 census);

== Geography ==
The khutor is located 85 km (53 mi) from the Russia–Ukraine border, 27 km (17 mi) south-east of Kursk, 19 km (12 mi) north-east of the district center – the urban-type settlement Medvenka, 3 km (1.9 mi) from the selsoviet center – 2nd Kitayevka.

Climate

Nizhnyaya Kamyshevka has a warm-summer humid continental climate (Dfb in the Köppen climate classification).

== Transport ==
Nizhnyaya Kamyshevka is located 18 km (11 mi) from the federal route M-2 Crimea Highway (a part of the European route E105), 5 km (3.1 mi) from the road of intermunicipal significance 38H-236 (M2 "Crimea Highway" – Polevaya), on the road 38H-237 (M2 "Crimea Highway" – Polny – 38N-236), 14.5 km (9.0 mi) from the nearest railway station Polevaya (railway line Klyukva — Belgorod).

The rural locality is situated 28 km (17 mi) from Kursk Vostochny Airport, 96 km (60 mi) from Belgorod International Airport and 200 km (120 mi) from Voronezh Peter the Great Airport.
