= 1st Kitayevka =

Rural locality in Kursk Oblast, Russia

1st Kitayevka 1-я Китаевка
- Selo
- Interactive map of 1st Kitayevka
- Location of 1st Kitayevka 1st Kitayevka (Kursk Oblast)
- Coordinates: 51°29′27″N 36°20′53″E
- Country: Russia
- Federal subject: Kursk Oblast
- Administrative district: Medvensky District
- SelsovietSelsoviet: Kitayevsky
- Elevation: 176 m (577 ft)

Population (2010 Census)
  - Total: 108
  - Estimate (2010): 108 (0%)

Municipal status
  - Municipal district: Medvensky Municipal District
  - Rural settlement: Kitayevsky Selsoviet Rural Settlement
- Time zone: UTC+3 (MSK)
- Postal code: 307052
- Dialing code: +7 47146
- OKTMO ID: 38624424181
- Website: kitayss.rkursk.ru

1st Kitayevka or Pervaya Kitayevka (Russian: 1-я Китаевка, Первая Китаевка) is a rural locality (Russian: село, lit. 'village') in Kitayevsky Selsoviet Rural Settlement, Medvensky District, Kursk Oblast, Russia. Population: 108 (2010 census); 109 (2002 census);

== Geography ==
The village is located on the Galichy Brook (a left tributary of the Polnaya in the basin of the Seym), 82 km (51 mi) from the Russia–Ukraine border, 27 km (17 mi) south-east of Kursk, 16.5 km (10.3 mi) north-east of the district center – the urban-type settlement Medvenka, at the еаstern border of the selsoviet center – 2nd Kitayevka.

Climate

1st Kitayevka has a warm-summer humid continental climate (Dfb in the Köppen climate classification).

Climate data for 1st Kitayevka
Month	Jan	Feb	Mar	Apr	May	Jun	Jul	Aug	Sep	Oct	Nov	Dec	Year
Mean daily maximum °C (°F)	−4.1 (24.6)	−3.1 (26.4)	2.8 (37.0)	13 (55)	19.3 (66.7)	22.6 (72.7)	25.3 (77.5)	24.6 (76.3)	18.2 (64.8)	10.6 (51.1)	3.4 (38.1)	−1.2 (29.8)	11.0 (51.7)
Daily mean °C (°F)	−6.2 (20.8)	−5.7 (21.7)	−0.8 (30.6)	8.2 (46.8)	14.7 (58.5)	18.3 (64.9)	20.9 (69.6)	20 (68)	14 (57)	7.2 (45.0)	1.1 (34.0)	−3.2 (26.2)	7.4 (45.3)
Mean daily minimum °C (°F)	−8.7 (16.3)	−8.9 (16.0)	−4.9 (23.2)	2.6 (36.7)	9 (48)	12.9 (55.2)	15.7 (60.3)	14.8 (58.6)	9.6 (49.3)	3.9 (39.0)	−1.2 (29.8)	−5.3 (22.5)	3.3 (37.9)
Average precipitation mm (inches)	50 (2.0)	43 (1.7)	46 (1.8)	48 (1.9)	60 (2.4)	68 (2.7)	70 (2.8)	54 (2.1)	57 (2.2)	57 (2.2)	45 (1.8)	48 (1.9)	646 (25.5)
Source: https://en.climate-data.org/asia/russian-federation/kursk-oblast/1-я-китаевка-681744/

== Transport ==
1st Kitayevka is located 16 km (9.9 mi) from the federal route M-2 Crimea Highway (a part of the European route E105), 7 km (4.3 mi) from the road of intermunicipal significance 38H-236 (M2 "Crimea Highway" – Polevaya), on the road 38H-237 (M2 "Crimea Highway" – Polny – 38N-236), 17 km (11 mi) from the nearest railway station Polevaya (railway line Klyukva — Belgorod).

The rural locality is situated 29 km (18 mi) from Kursk Vostochny Airport, 95 km (59 mi) from Belgorod International Airport and 202 km (126 mi) from Voronezh Peter the Great Airport.
