= Zelyonaya Step =

Rural locality in Kursk Oblast, Russia

Zelyonaya Step Зелёная Степь
- Khutor
- Interactive map of Zelyonaya Step
- Location of Zelyonaya Step Zelyonaya Step (Kursk Oblast)
- Coordinates: 51°30′02″N 36°17′56″E
- Country: Russia
- Federal subject: Kursk Oblast
- Administrative district: Medvensky District
- SelsovietSelsoviet: Kitayevsky

Population (2010 Census)
  - Total: 19
  - Estimate (2010): 19 (0%)

Municipal status
  - Municipal district: Medvensky Municipal District
  - Rural settlement: Kitayevsky Selsoviet Rural Settlement
- Time zone: UTC+3 (MSK)
- Postal code: 307043
- Dialing code: +7 47146
- OKTMO ID: 38624424171
- Website: kitayss.rkursk.ru

Zelyonaya Step (Russian: Зелёная Степь) is a rural locality (a khutor) in Kitayevsky Selsoviet Rural Settlement, Medvensky District, Kursk Oblast, Russia. Population: 19 (2010 census); 28 (2002 census);

== Geography ==
The khutor is located on the Galichy Brook (a left tributary of the Polnaya in the basin of the Seym), 80 km (50 mi) from the Russia–Ukraine border, 25 km (16 mi) south-east of Kursk, 14.5 km (9.0 mi) north-east of the district center – the urban-type settlement Medvenka, 2 km (1.2 mi) from the selsoviet center – 2nd Kitayevka.

Climate

Zelyonaya Step has a warm-summer humid continental climate (Dfb in the Köppen climate classification).

== Transport ==
Zelyonaya Step is located 13.5 km (8.4 mi) from the federal route M-2 Crimea Highway (a part of the European route E105), 5 km (3.1 mi) from the road of intermunicipal significance 38H-236 (M2 "Crimea Highway" – Polevaya), 2.5 km (1.6 mi) from the road 38H-237 (M2 "Crimea Highway" – Polny – 38N-236), on the road 38H-244 (38N-237 – 2nd Kitayevka – Zelyonaya Step), 17.5 km (10.9 mi) from the nearest railway halt Kolodnoye (railway line Klyukva — Belgorod).

The rural locality is situated 28 km (17 mi) from Kursk Vostochny Airport, 96 km (60 mi) from Belgorod International Airport and 206 km (128 mi) from Voronezh Peter the Great Airport.
