= 1st Nikolskoye =

Rural locality in Kursk Oblast, Russia

1st Nikolskoye 1-е Никольское
- Village
- Interactive map of 1st Nikolskoye
- Location of 1st Nikolskoye 1st Nikolskoye (Kursk Oblast)
- Coordinates: 51°29′06″N 36°22′19″E
- Country: Russia
- Federal subject: Kursk Oblast
- Administrative district: Medvensky District
- SelsovietSelsoviet: Kitayevsky

Population (2010 Census)
  - Total: 7
  - Estimate (2010): 7 (0%)

Municipal status
  - Municipal district: Medvensky Municipal District
  - Rural settlement: Kitayevsky Selsoviet Rural Settlement
- Time zone: UTC+3 (MSK)
- Postal code: 307051
- Dialing code: +7 47146
- OKTMO ID: 38624424126
- Website: kitayss.rkursk.ru

1st Nikolskoye or Pervoye Nikolskoye (Russian: 1-е Никольское, Первое Никольское) is a rural locality (Russian: деревня, lit. 'village') in Kitayevsky Selsoviet Rural Settlement, Medvensky District, Kursk Oblast, Russia. Population: 7 (2010 census); 15 (2002 census);

== Geography ==
The village is located on the Polnaya River (a left tributary of the Seym), 83 km (52 mi) from the Russia–Ukraine border, 29 km (18 mi) south-east of Kursk, 18 km (11 mi) north-east of the district center – the urban-type settlement Medvenka, 2 km (1.2 mi) from the selsoviet center – 2nd Kitayevka.

Climate

1st Nikolskoye has a warm-summer humid continental climate (Dfb in the Köppen climate classification).

== Transport ==
1st Nikolskoye is located 17 km (11 mi) from the federal route M-2 Crimea Highway (a part of the European route E105), 7.5 km (4.7 mi) from the road of intermunicipal significance 38H-236 (M2 "Crimea Highway" – Polevaya), 1.5 km (0.93 mi) from the road 38H-237 (M2 "Crimea Highway" – Polny – 38N-236), 16.5 km (10.3 mi) from the nearest railway station Polevaya (railway line Klyukva — Belgorod).

The rural locality is situated 30 km (19 mi) from Kursk Vostochny Airport, 94 km (58 mi) from Belgorod International Airport and 201 km (125 mi) from Voronezh Peter the Great Airport.
