= Solomykovskiye Dvory =

Rural locality in Kursk Oblast, Russia

Solomykovskiye Dvory Соломыковские Дворы
- Khutor
- Interactive map of Solomykovskiye Dvory
- Location of Solomykovskiye Dvory Solomykovskiye Dvory (Kursk Oblast)
- Coordinates: 51°27′58″N 36°05′48″E
- Country: Russia
- Federal subject: Kursk Oblast
- Administrative district: Medvensky District
- SelsovietSelsoviet: Nizhnereutchansky
- Elevation: 250 m (820 ft)

Population (2010 Census)
  - Total: 55
  - Estimate (2010): 55 (0%)

Municipal status
  - Municipal district: Medvensky Municipal District
  - Rural settlement: Nizhnereutchansky Selsoviet Rural Settlement
- Time zone: UTC+3 (MSK)
- Postal code: 307030
- Dialing code: +7 47146
- OKTMO ID: 38624436161
- Website: nizhnezeut.rkursk.ru

Solomykovskiye Dvory (Russian: Соломыковские Дворы) is a rural locality (a khutor) in Nizhnereutchansky Selsoviet Rural Settlement, Medvensky District, Kursk Oblast, Russia. Population: 55 (2010 census); 73 (2002 census);

== Geography ==
The khutor is located 67 km from the Russia–Ukraine border, 28 km south-west of Kursk, 3 km north of the district center – the urban-type settlement Medvenka, 12 km from the selsoviet center – Nizhny Reutets.

Climate

Solomykovskiye Dvory has a warm-summer humid continental climate (Dfb in the Köppen climate classification).

== Transport ==
Solomykovskiye Dvory is located on the federal route M-2 Crimea Highway (a part of the European route E105), on the road of intermunicipal significance 38H-236 (M2 "Crimea Highway" – Polevaya), 20 km from the nearest railway halt 457 km (railway line Lgov I — Kursk).

The rural locality is situated 35 km from Kursk Vostochny Airport, 96 km from Belgorod International Airport and 220 km from Voronezh Peter the Great Airport.
