= Nizhny Dubovets =

Rural locality in Kursk Oblast, Russia

Nizhny Dubovets Нижний Дубовец
- Village
- Interactive map of Nizhny Dubovets
- Location of Nizhny Dubovets Nizhny Dubovets (Kursk Oblast)
- Coordinates: 51°25′37″N 36°18′21″E
- Country: Russia
- Federal subject: Kursk Oblast
- Administrative district: Medvensky District
- SelsovietSelsoviet: Chermoshnyansky

Population (2010 Census)
  - Total: 218
  - Estimate (2010): 218 (0%)

Administrative status
  - Capital of: Chermoshnyansky Selsoviet

Municipal status
  - Municipal district: Medvensky Municipal District
  - Rural settlement: Chermoshnyansky Selsoviet Rural Settlement
  - Capital of: Chermoshnyansky Selsoviet Rural Settlement
- Time zone: UTC+3 (MSK)
- Postal code: 307050
- Dialing code: +7 47146
- OKTMO ID: 38624456101
- Website: kitayss.rkursk.ru

Nizhny Dubovets (Russian: Нижний Дубовец) is a rural locality (Russian: деревня, lit. 'village') and the administrative center of Chermoshnyansky Selsoviet Rural Settlement, Medvensky District, Kursk Oblast, Russia. Population: 218 (2010 census); 228 (2002 census);

== Geography ==
The village is located on the Dubovets Brook (a right tributary of the Polnaya in the basin of the Seym), 76 km (47 mi) from the Russia–Ukraine border, 33 km (21 mi) south-east of Kursk, 11 km (6.8 mi) north-east of the district center – the urban-type settlement Medvenka.

Climate

Nizhny Dubovets has a warm-summer humid continental climate (Dfb in the Köppen climate classification).

== Transport ==
Nizhny Dubovets is located 11.5 km (7.1 mi) from the federal route M-2 Crimea Highway (a part of the European route E105), 11 km (6.8 mi) from the road of intermunicipal significance 38H-236 (M2 "Crimea Highway" – Polevaya), 2.5 km (1.6 mi) from the road 38H-237 (M2 "Crimea Highway" – Polny – 38N-236), on the road 38H-240 (38N-237 – Vyshny Dubovets – border with Oboyansky District), 24.5 km (15.2 mi) from the nearest railway station Polevaya (railway line Klyukva — Belgorod).

The rural locality is situated 36 km (22 mi) from Kursk Vostochny Airport, 88 km (55 mi) from Belgorod International Airport and 207 km (129 mi) from Voronezh Peter the Great Airport.
