= Domra, Kursk Oblast =

Rural locality in Kursk Oblast, Russia

Domra Домра
- Khutor
- Interactive map of Domra
- Location of Domra Domra (Kursk Oblast)
- Coordinates: 51°30′21″N 35°48′43″E
- Country: Russia
- Federal subject: Kursk Oblast
- Administrative district: Medvensky District
- SelsovietSelsoviet: Gostomlyansky

Population (2010 Census)
  - Total: 3
  - Estimate (2010): 3 (0%)

Municipal status
  - Municipal district: Medvensky Municipal District
  - Rural settlement: Gostomlyansky Selsoviet Rural Settlement
- Time zone: UTC+3 (MSK)
- Postal code: 307042
- Dialing code: +7 47146
- OKTMO ID: 38624420156
- Website: gostomlja.ru

Domra (Russian: Домра) is a rural locality (a khutor) in Gostomlyansky Selsoviet Rural Settlement, Medvensky District, Kursk Oblast, Russia. Population: 3 (2010 census); 12 (2002 census);

== Geography ==
The khutor is located 56 km (35 mi) from the Russia–Ukraine border, 32 km (20 mi) south-west of Kursk, 22 km (14 mi) north-west of the district center – the urban-type settlement Medvenka, 7 km (4.3 mi) from the selsoviet center – 1st Gostomlya.

Climate

Domra has a warm-summer humid continental climate (Dfb in the Köppen climate classification).

== Transport ==
Domra is located 16.5 km (10.3 mi) from the federal route M-2 Crimea Highway (a part of the European route E105), 0.5 km (0.31 mi) from the road of regional importance 38K-004 (Dyakonovo – Sudzha – border with Ukraine), on the road 38K-009 (M2 Crimea Highway – 38K-004), 15 km (9.3 mi) from the nearest railway halt 439 km (railway line Lgov I — Kursk).

The rural locality is situated 43 km (27 mi) from Kursk Vostochny Airport, 109 km (68 mi) from Belgorod International Airport and 239 km (149 mi) from Voronezh Peter the Great Airport.
