= 2nd Plesy =

Rural locality in Kursk Oblast, Russia

2nd Plesy 2-е Плесы
- Village
- Interactive map of 2nd Plesy
- Location of 2nd Plesy 2nd Plesy (Kursk Oblast)
- Coordinates: 51°25′34″N 35°49′12″E
- Country: Russia
- Federal subject: Kursk Oblast
- Administrative district: Medvensky District
- SelsovietSelsoviet: Gostomlyansky

Population (2010 Census)
  - Total: 7
  - Estimate (2010): 7 (0%)

Municipal status
  - Municipal district: Medvensky Municipal District
  - Rural settlement: Gostomlyansky Selsoviet Rural Settlement
- Time zone: UTC+3 (MSK)
- Postal code: 307042
- Dialing code: +7 47146
- OKTMO ID: 38624420181
- Website: gostomlja.ru

2nd Plesy or Vtorye Plesy (Russian: 2-е Плесы, Вторые Плесы) is a rural locality (Russian: деревня, lit. 'village') in Gostomlyansky Selsoviet Rural Settlement, Medvensky District, Kursk Oblast, Russia. Population: 7 (2010 census); 20 (2002 census);

== Geography ==
The village is located on the Lyubach River (a left tributary of the Reut River in the Seym basin), 50 km (31 mi) from the Russia–Ukraine border, 39.5 km (24.5 mi) south-west of Kursk, 19 km (12 mi) west of the district center – the urban-type settlement Medvenka, 2.5 km (1.6 mi) from the selsoviet center – 1st Gostomlya.

Climate

2nd Plesy has a warm-summer humid continental climate (Dfb in the Köppen climate classification).

== Transport ==
2nd Plesy is located 18.5 km (11.5 mi) from the federal route M-2 Crimea Highway (a part of the European route E105), 8 km (5.0 mi) from the road of regional importance 38K-004 (Dyakonovo – Sudzha – border with Ukraine), 14.5 km (9.0 mi) from the road of intermunicipal significance 38H-185 (M2 "Crimea Highway" – Gakhovo), 1 km (0.62 mi) from the road 38H-195 (38N-185 – 38K-004), 23.5 km (14.6 mi) from the nearest railway halt 439 km (railway line Lgov I — Kursk).

The rural locality is situated 49 km (30 mi) from Kursk Vostochny Airport, 100 km (62 mi) from Belgorod International Airport and 240 km (150 mi) from Voronezh Peter the Great Airport.
