= Krasnaya Nov, Medvensky District, Kursk Oblast =

Rural locality in Kursk Oblast, Russia

Krasnaya Nov Красная Новь
- Khutor
- Interactive map of Krasnaya Nov
- Location of Krasnaya Nov Krasnaya Nov (Kursk Oblast)
- Coordinates: 51°28′05″N 36°04′47″E
- Country: Russia
- Federal subject: Kursk Oblast
- Administrative district: Medvensky District
- SelsovietSelsoviet: Nizhnereutchansky

Population (2010 Census)
  - Total: 39
  - Estimate (2010): 39 (0%)

Municipal status
  - Municipal district: Medvensky Municipal District
  - Rural settlement: Nizhnereutchansky Selsoviet Rural Settlement
- Time zone: UTC+3 (MSK)
- Postal code: 307030
- Dialing code: +7 47146
- OKTMO ID: 38624436141
- Website: nizhnezeut.rkursk.ru

Krasnaya Nov (Russian: Красная Новь) is a rural locality (a khutor) in Nizhnereutchansky Selsoviet Rural Settlement, Medvensky District, Kursk Oblast, Russia. Population: 39 (2010 census); 68 (2002 census);

== Geography ==
The khutor is located 66 km from the Russia–Ukraine border, 27 km south-west of Kursk, 5 km north-west of the district center – the urban-type settlement Medvenka, 11.5 km from the selsoviet center – Nizhny Reutets.

Climate

Krasnaya Nov has a warm-summer humid continental climate (Dfb in the Köppen climate classification).

== Transport ==
Krasnaya Nov is located 0.5 km from the federal route M-2 Crimea Highway (a part of the European route E105), 20 km from the nearest railway halt and passing loop 454 km (railway line Lgov I — Kursk).

The rural locality is situated 35 km from Kursk Vostochny Airport, 96 km from Belgorod International Airport and 221 km from Voronezh Peter the Great Airport.
