= Spokoyevka =

Rural locality in Kursk Oblast, Russia

Spokoyevka Спокоевка
- Khutor
- Interactive map of Spokoyevka
- Location of Spokoyevka Spokoyevka (Kursk Oblast)
- Coordinates: 51°30′11″N 35°58′26″E
- Country: Russia
- Federal subject: Kursk Oblast
- Administrative district: Medvensky District
- SelsovietSelsoviet: Vysoksky

Population (2010 Census)
  - Total: 9
  - Estimate (2010): 9 (0%)

Municipal status
  - Municipal district: Medvensky Municipal District
  - Rural settlement: Vysoksky Selsoviet Rural Settlement
- Time zone: UTC+3 (MSK)
- Postal code: 307043
- Dialing code: +7 47146
- OKTMO ID: 38624408166
- Website: visoksk.rkursk.ru

Spokoyevka (Russian: Спокоевка) is a rural locality (a khutor) in Vysoksky Selsoviet Rural Settlement, Medvensky District, Kursk Oblast, Russia. Population: 9 (2010 census); 7 (2002 census);

== Geography ==
The khutor is located 64 km from the Russia–Ukraine border, 26 km south-west of Kursk, 12 km north-west of the district center – the urban-type settlement Medvenka, 8 km from the selsoviet center – Vysokoye.

Climate

Spokoyevka has a warm-summer humid continental climate (Dfb in the Köppen climate classification).

== Transport ==
Spokoyevka is located 5.5 km from the federal route M-2 Crimea Highway (a part of the European route E105), 10.5 km from the road of regional importance 38K-004 (Dyakonovo – Sudzha – border with Ukraine), 3 km from the road 38K-009 (M2 Crimea Highway – 38K-004), 16 km from the nearest railway station Dyakonovo (railway line Lgov I — Kursk).

The rural locality is situated 35 km from Kursk Vostochny Airport, 103 km from Belgorod International Airport and 228 km from Voronezh Peter the Great Airport.
