= Spasskiye Vyselki, Kursk Oblast =

Rural locality in Kursk Oblast, Russia

Spasskiye Vyselki Спасские Выселки
- Khutor
- Interactive map of Spasskiye Vyselki
- Location of Spasskiye Vyselki Spasskiye Vyselki (Kursk Oblast)
- Coordinates: 51°26′27″N 35°55′46″E
- Country: Russia
- Federal subject: Kursk Oblast
- Administrative district: Medvensky District
- SelsovietSelsoviet: Vysoksky

Population (2010 Census)
  - Total: 73
  - Estimate (2010): 73 (0%)

Municipal status
  - Municipal district: Medvensky Municipal District
  - Rural settlement: Vysoksky Selsoviet Rural Settlement
- Time zone: UTC+3 (MSK)
- Postal code: 307040
- Dialing code: +7 47146
- OKTMO ID: 38624408141
- Website: visoksk.rkursk.ru

Spasskiye Vyselki (Russian: Спасские Выселки) is a rural locality (a khutor) in Vysoksky Selsoviet Rural Settlement, Medvensky District, Kursk Oblast, Russia. Population: 73 (2010 census); 98 (2002 census);

== Geography ==
The khutor is located on the Reut River (a left tributary of the Seym), 57 km (35 mi) from the Russia–Ukraine border, 34 km (21 mi) south-west of Kursk, 11 km (6.8 mi) north-west of the district center – the urban-type settlement Medvenka, 4.5 km (2.8 mi) from the selsoviet center – Vysokoye.

Climate

Spasskiye Vyselki has a warm-summer humid continental climate (Dfb in the Köppen climate classification).

== Transport ==
Spasskiye Vyselki is located 10.5 km (6.5 mi) from the federal route M-2 Crimea Highway (a part of the European route E105), on the road of intermunicipal significance 38H-588 (Spasskoye – Spasskiye Vyselki – Kondratyevskiye Vyselki), 23 km (14 mi) from the nearest railway station Dyakonovo (railway line Lgov I — Kursk).

The rural locality is situated 42 km (26 mi) from Kursk Vostochny Airport, 98 km (61 mi) from Belgorod International Airport and 232 km (144 mi) from Voronezh Peter the Great Airport.
