= 1st Pereverzevka =

Rural locality in Kursk Oblast, Russia

1st Pereverzevka 1-я Переверзевка
- Village
- Interactive map of 1st Pereverzevka
- Location of 1st Pereverzevka 1st Pereverzevka (Kursk Oblast)
- Coordinates: 51°26′17″N 35°54′03″E
- Country: Russia
- Federal subject: Kursk Oblast
- Administrative district: Medvensky District
- SelsovietSelsoviet: Vysoksky

Population (2010 Census)
  - Total: 71
  - Estimate (2010): 71 (0%)

Municipal status
  - Municipal district: Medvensky Municipal District
  - Rural settlement: Vysoksky Selsoviet Rural Settlement
- Time zone: UTC+3 (MSK)
- Postal code: 307040
- Dialing code: +7 47146
- OKTMO ID: 38624408131
- Website: visoksk.rkursk.ru

1st Pereverzevka or Pervaya Pereverzevka (Russian: 1-я Переверзевка, Первая Переверзевка) is a rural locality (Russian: деревня, lit. 'village') in Vysoksky Selsoviet Rural Settlement, Medvensky District, Kursk Oblast, Russia. Population: 71 (2010 census); 75 (2002 census);

== Geography ==
The village is located on the Reut River (a left tributary of the Seym), 56 km (35 mi) from the Russia–Ukraine border, 35 km (22 mi) south-west of Kursk, 13 km (8.1 mi) north-west of the district center – the urban-type settlement Medvenka, 6.5 km (4.0 mi) from the selsoviet center – Vysokoye.

Climate

1st Pereverzevka has a warm-summer humid continental climate (Dfb in the Köppen climate classification).

== Transport ==
1st Pereverzevka is located 12.5 km (7.8 mi) from the federal route M-2 Crimea Highway (a part of the European route E105), 10.5 km (6.5 mi) from the road of regional importance 38K-004 (Dyakonovo – Sudzha – border with Ukraine), 10.5 km (6.5 mi) from the road of intermunicipal significance 38H-185 (M2 "Crimea Highway" – Gakhovo), on the road 38H-195 (38N-185 – 38K-004), 23.5 km (14.6 mi) from the nearest railway station Dyakonovo (railway line Lgov I — Kursk).

The rural locality is situated 43 km (27 mi) from Kursk Vostochny Airport, 99 km (62 mi) from Belgorod International Airport and 233 km (145 mi) from Voronezh Peter the Great Airport.
