= 1st Plesy =

Rural locality in Kursk Oblast, Russia

1st Plesy 1-е Плесы
- Village
- Interactive map of 1st Plesy
- Location of 1st Plesy 1st Plesy (Kursk Oblast)
- Coordinates: 51°26′28″N 35°49′01″E
- Country: Russia
- Federal subject: Kursk Oblast
- Administrative district: Medvensky District
- SelsovietSelsoviet: Gostomlyansky

Population (2010 Census)
  - Total: 59
  - Estimate (2010): 59 (0%)

Municipal status
  - Municipal district: Medvensky Municipal District
  - Rural settlement: Gostomlyansky Selsoviet Rural Settlement
- Time zone: UTC+3 (MSK)
- Postal code: 307041
- Dialing code: +7 47146
- OKTMO ID: 38624420111
- Website: gostomlja.ru

1st Plesy or Pervye Plesy (Russian: 1-е Плесы, Первые Плесы) is a rural locality (Russian: деревня, lit. 'village') in Gostomlyansky Selsoviet Rural Settlement, Medvensky District, Kursk Oblast, Russia. Population: 59 (2010 census); 109 (2002 census);

== Geography ==
The village is located on the Reut River (a left tributary of the Seym), 52 km (32 mi) from the Russia–Ukraine border, 38 km (24 mi) south-west of Kursk, 19 km (12 mi) west of the district center – the urban-type settlement Medvenka, 2 km (1.2 mi) from the selsoviet center – 1st Gostomlya.

Climate

1st Plesy has a warm-summer humid continental climate (Dfb in the Köppen climate classification).

== Transport ==
1st Plesy is located 18 km (11 mi) from the federal route M-2 Crimea Highway (a part of the European route E105), 6.5 km (4.0 mi) from the road of regional importance 38K-004 (Dyakonovo – Sudzha – border with Ukraine), 5 km (3.1 mi) from the road 38K-009 (M2 Crimea Highway – 38K-004), 15.5 km (9.6 mi) from the road of intermunicipal significance 38H-185 (M2 "Crimea Highway" – Gakhovo), on the road 38H-195 (38N-185 – 38K-004), 22 km (14 mi) from the nearest railway halt 439 km (railway line Lgov I — Kursk).

The rural locality is situated 47.5 km (29.5 mi) from Kursk Vostochny Airport, 102 km (63 mi) from Belgorod International Airport and 240 km (150 mi) from Voronezh Peter the Great Airport.
