= Drachyovka =

Rural locality in Kursk Oblast, Russia

Drachyovka Драчёвка
- Selo
- Interactive map of Drachyovka
- Location of Drachyovka Drachyovka (Kursk Oblast)
- Coordinates: 51°20′35″N 36°13′05″E
- Country: Russia
- Federal subject: Kursk Oblast
- Administrative district: Medvensky District
- SelsovietSelsoviet: Panikinsky
- Elevation: 195 m (640 ft)

Population (2010 Census)
  - Total: 332
  - Estimate (2010): 332 (0%)

Municipal status
  - Municipal district: Medvensky Municipal District
  - Rural settlement: Panikinsky Selsoviet Rural Settlement
- Time zone: UTC+3 (MSK)
- Postal code: 307054
- Dialing code: +7 47146
- OKTMO ID: 38624440106
- Website: panikiss.rkursk.ru

Drachyovka (Russian: Драчёвка) is a rural locality (Russian: село, lit. 'village') in Panikinsky Selsoviet Rural Settlement, Medvensky District, Kursk Oblast, Russia. Population: 332 (2010 census); 362 (2002 census);

== Geography ==
The village is located on the Paniki Brook (a left tributary of the Polnaya in the basin of the Seym), 66 km (41 mi) from the Russia–Ukraine border, 41 km (25 mi) south of Kursk, 9.5 km (5.9 mi) south-east of the district center – the urban-type settlement Medvenka, 2.5 km (1.6 mi) from the selsoviet center – Paniki.

Climate

Drachyovka has a warm-summer humid continental climate (Dfb in the Köppen climate classification).

Climate data for Drachyovka
Month	Jan	Feb	Mar	Apr	May	Jun	Jul	Aug	Sep	Oct	Nov	Dec	Year
Mean daily maximum °C (°F)	−4 (25)	−2.9 (26.8)	3.1 (37.6)	13.1 (55.6)	19.5 (67.1)	22.8 (73.0)	25.4 (77.7)	24.8 (76.6)	18.4 (65.1)	10.7 (51.3)	3.4 (38.1)	−1.1 (30.0)	11.1 (52.0)
Daily mean °C (°F)	−6.1 (21.0)	−5.6 (21.9)	−0.6 (30.9)	8.3 (46.9)	14.8 (58.6)	18.5 (65.3)	21 (70)	20.2 (68.4)	14.1 (57.4)	7.3 (45.1)	1.2 (34.2)	−3.1 (26.4)	7.5 (45.5)
Mean daily minimum °C (°F)	−8.6 (16.5)	−8.7 (16.3)	−4.7 (23.5)	2.8 (37.0)	9.1 (48.4)	13.1 (55.6)	15.9 (60.6)	15 (59)	9.8 (49.6)	4 (39)	−1.1 (30.0)	−5.3 (22.5)	3.4 (38.2)
Average precipitation mm (inches)	50 (2.0)	44 (1.7)	48 (1.9)	49 (1.9)	62 (2.4)	69 (2.7)	73 (2.9)	53 (2.1)	57 (2.2)	57 (2.2)	46 (1.8)	50 (2.0)	658 (25.8)
Source: https://en.climate-data.org/asia/russian-federation/kursk-oblast/драчевка-681732/

== Transport ==
Drachyovka is located 3 km (1.9 mi) from the federal route M-2 Crimea Highway (a part of the European route E105), on the roads of intermunicipal significance 38H-229 ("Crimea Highway" – Paniki – Drachyovka) and 38H-230 ("Crimea Highway" – Drachyovka), 35 km (22 mi) from the nearest railway halt 457 km (railway line Lgov I — Kursk).

The rural locality is situated 46 km (29 mi) from Kursk Vostochny Airport, 81 km (50 mi) from Belgorod International Airport and 215 km (134 mi) from Voronezh Peter the Great Airport.
