= Bolshaya Radina =

Rural locality in Kursk Oblast, Russia

Bolshaya Radina Большая Радина
- Khutor
- Interactive map of Bolshaya Radina
- Location of Bolshaya Radina Bolshaya Radina (Kursk Oblast)
- Coordinates: 51°23′31″N 36°05′26″E
- Country: Russia
- Federal subject: Kursk Oblast
- Administrative district: Medvensky District
- SelsovietSelsoviet: Nizhnereutchansky

Population (2010 Census)
  - Total: 77
  - Estimate (2010): 77 (0%)

Municipal status
  - Municipal district: Medvensky Municipal District
  - Rural settlement: Nizhnereutchansky Selsoviet Rural Settlement
- Time zone: UTC+3 (MSK)
- Postal code: 307047
- Dialing code: +7 47146
- OKTMO ID: 38624436116
- Website: nizhnezeut.rkursk.ru

Bolshaya Radina (Russian: Большая Радина) is a rural locality (a khutor) in Nizhnereutchansky Selsoviet Rural Settlement, Medvensky District, Kursk Oblast, Russia. Population: 77 (2010 census); 63 (2002 census);

== Geography ==
The khutor is located on the Reut River (a left tributary of the Seym), 61 km from the Russia–Ukraine border, 36 km south-west of Kursk, 3 km south-west of the district center – the urban-type settlement Medvenka, 5 km from the selsoviet center – Nizhny Reutets.

Climate

Bolshaya Radina has a warm-summer humid continental climate (Dfb in the Köppen climate classification).

== Transport ==
Bolshaya Radina is located 4 km from the federal route M-2 Crimea Highway (a part of the European route E105), 1.5 km from the road of intermunicipal significance 38H-185 (M2 "Crimea Highway" – Gakhovo), 28.5 km from the nearest railway halt 457 km (railway line Lgov I — Kursk).

The rural locality is situated 43 km from Kursk Vostochny Airport, 89 km from Belgorod International Airport and 222 km from Voronezh Peter the Great Airport.
