= Vyshny Dubovets =

Rural locality in Kursk Oblast, Russia

Vyshny Dubovets Вышний Дубовец
- Selo
- Interactive map of Vyshny Dubovets
- Location of Vyshny Dubovets Vyshny Dubovets (Kursk Oblast)
- Coordinates: 51°24′43″N 36°21′58″E
- Country: Russia
- Federal subject: Kursk Oblast
- Administrative district: Medvensky District
- SelsovietSelsoviet: Chermoshnyansky

Population (2010 Census)
  - Total: 256
  - Estimate (2010): 256 (0%)

Municipal status
  - Municipal district: Medvensky Municipal District
  - Rural settlement: Chermoshnyansky Selsoviet Rural Settlement
- Time zone: UTC+3 (MSK)
- Postal code: 307053
- Dialing code: +7 47146
- OKTMO ID: 38624456131
- Website: kitayss.rkursk.ru

Vyshny Dubovets (Russian: Вышний Дубовец) is a rural locality (Russian: село, lit. 'village') in Chermoshnyansky Selsoviet Rural Settlement, Medvensky District, Kursk Oblast, Russia. Population: 256 (2010 census); 251 (2002 census);

== Geography ==
The village is located on the Dubovets Brook (a right tributary of the Polnaya in the basin of the Seym), 78 km (48 mi) from the Russia–Ukraine border, 35.5 km (22.1 mi) south-east of Kursk, 15.5 km (9.6 mi) east of the district center – the urban-type settlement Medvenka, 4.5 km (2.8 mi) from the selsoviet center – Nizhny Dubovets.

Climate

Vyshny Dubovets has a warm-summer humid continental climate (Dfb in the Köppen climate classification).

Climate data for Vyshny Dubovets
Month	Jan	Feb	Mar	Apr	May	Jun	Jul	Aug	Sep	Oct	Nov	Dec	Year
Mean daily maximum °C (°F)	−4.2 (24.4)	−3.1 (26.4)	2.8 (37.0)	12.9 (55.2)	19.3 (66.7)	22.6 (72.7)	25.3 (77.5)	24.7 (76.5)	18.2 (64.8)	10.5 (50.9)	3.3 (37.9)	−1.3 (29.7)	10.9 (51.6)
Daily mean °C (°F)	−6.2 (20.8)	−5.7 (21.7)	−0.8 (30.6)	8.1 (46.6)	14.7 (58.5)	18.3 (64.9)	20.9 (69.6)	20 (68)	14 (57)	7.2 (45.0)	1.1 (34.0)	−3.2 (26.2)	7.4 (45.2)
Mean daily minimum °C (°F)	−8.8 (16.2)	−8.9 (16.0)	−5 (23)	2.6 (36.7)	8.9 (48.0)	12.9 (55.2)	15.7 (60.3)	14.8 (58.6)	9.6 (49.3)	3.8 (38.8)	−1.2 (29.8)	−5.4 (22.3)	3.3 (37.9)
Average precipitation mm (inches)	50 (2.0)	43 (1.7)	46 (1.8)	48 (1.9)	60 (2.4)	68 (2.7)	70 (2.8)	54 (2.1)	57 (2.2)	57 (2.2)	45 (1.8)	48 (1.9)	646 (25.5)
Source: https://en.climate-data.org/asia/russian-federation/kursk-oblast/вышнии-дубовец-681656/

== Transport ==
Vyshny Dubovets is located 15.5 km (9.6 mi) from the federal route M-2 Crimea Highway (a part of the European route E105), 15.5 km (9.6 mi) from the road of intermunicipal significance 38H-236 (M2 "Crimea Highway" – Polevaya), 7 km (4.3 mi) from the road 38H-237 (M2 "Crimea Highway" – Polny – 38N-236), on the road 38H-240 (38N-237 – Vyshny Dubovets – border with Oboyansky District), 22.5 km (14.0 mi) from the nearest railway station Shumakovo (railway line Klyukva — Belgorod).

The rural locality is situated 38 km (24 mi) from Kursk Vostochny Airport, 86 km (53 mi) from Belgorod International Airport and 203 km (126 mi) from Voronezh Peter the Great Airport.
