= Andrianovka, Medvensky District, Kursk Oblast =

Rural locality in Kursk Oblast, Russia

Andrianovka Андриановка
- Village
- Interactive map of Andrianovka
- Location of Andrianovka Andrianovka (Kursk Oblast)
- Coordinates: 51°31′21″N 35°55′26″E
- Country: Russia
- Federal subject: Kursk Oblast
- Administrative district: Medvensky District
- SelsovietSelsoviet: Vysoksky

Population (2010 Census)
  - Total: 0
  - Estimate (2010): 0 )

Municipal status
  - Municipal district: Medvensky Municipal District
  - Rural settlement: Vysoksky Selsoviet Rural Settlement
- Time zone: UTC+3 (MSK)
- Postal code: 307040
- Dialing code: +7 47146
- OKTMO ID: 38624408111
- Website: visoksk.rkursk.ru

Andrianovka (Russian: Андриановка) is a rural locality (Russian: деревня, lit. 'village') in Vysoksky Selsoviet Rural Settlement, Medvensky District, Kursk Oblast, Russia. Population: 0 (2010 census); 16 (2002 census);

== Geography ==
The village is located on the Vorobzha River (a left tributary of the Seym River), 64 km from the Russia–Ukraine border, 26 km south-west of Kursk, 17 km north-west of the district center – the urban-type settlement Medvenka, 12 km from the selsoviet center – Vysokoye.

Climate

Andrianovka has a warm-summer humid continental climate (Dfb in the Köppen climate classification).

== Transport ==
Andrianovka is located 8.5 km from the federal route M-2 Crimea Highway (a part of the European route E105), 7 km from the road of regional importance 38K-004 (Dyakonovo – Sudzha – border with Ukraine), 1 km from the road of intermunicipal significance 38H-094 (38K-004 – Plotava), 14 km from the nearest railway station Dyakonovo (railway line Lgov I — Kursk).

The rural locality is situated 35.5 km from Kursk Vostochny Airport, 107 km from Belgorod International Airport and 231 km from Voronezh Peter the Great Airport.
