= Alexandrovka, Nizhnereutchansky Selsoviet, Medvensky District, Kursk Oblast =

Rural locality in Kursk Oblast, Russia

Alexandrovka Александровка
- Khutor
- Interactive map of Alexandrovka
- Location of Alexandrovka Alexandrovka (Kursk Oblast)
- Coordinates: 51°23′35″N 36°00′04″E
- Country: Russia
- Federal subject: Kursk Oblast
- Administrative district: Medvensky District
- SelsovietSelsoviet: Nizhnereutchansky

Population (2010 Census)
  - Total: 49
  - Estimate (2010): 49 (0%)

Municipal status
  - Municipal district: Medvensky Municipal District
  - Rural settlement: Nizhnereutchansky Selsoviet Rural Settlement
- Time zone: UTC+3 (MSK)
- Postal code: 307047
- Dialing code: +7 47146
- OKTMO ID: 38624436106
- Website: nizhnezeut.rkursk.ru

Alexandrovka (Russian: Александровка) is a rural locality (a khutor) in Nizhnereutchansky Selsoviet Rural Settlement, Medvensky District, Kursk Oblast, Russia. Population: 49 (2010 census); 57 (2002 census);

== Geography ==
The khutor is located on the Reutets River (a left tributary of the Reut River in the Seym basin), 57 km from the Russia–Ukraine border, 37 km south-west of Kursk, 7 km south-west of the district center – the urban-type settlement Medvenka, at the northern border of the selsoviet center – Nizhny Reutets.

Climate

Alexandrovka has a warm-summer humid continental climate (Dfb in the Köppen climate classification).

== Transport ==
Alexandrovka is located 9.5 km from the federal route M-2 Crimea Highway (a part of the European route E105), 2 km from the road of intermunicipal significance 38H-185 (M2 "Crimea Highway" – Gakhovo), on the road 38H-186 (38N-185 – Aleksandrowka), 28.5 km from the nearest railway halt and passing loop 454 km (railway line Lgov I — Kursk).

The rural locality is situated 45 km from Kursk Vostochny Airport, 91 km from Belgorod International Airport and 229 km from Voronezh Peter the Great Airport.
