= Kosilov =

Kosilov (Russian: Косилов) is a Russian surname. Notable people with the surname include:

- Nikolay Ivanovich Kosilov (1937–2009), Russian scientist and inventor, mechanical engineer, doctor of technical sciences, professor
- Sergey Alexeyevich Kosilov (born 1982), Russian canoeist
- Sergey Sergeyevich Kosilov (born 1979), Russian football player

Also

- Kosilov, Kursk Oblast, a khoetor in Medvensky District of Kursk Oblast
