= Church of Saint Olga, Göytepe =

The Church of Saint Olga
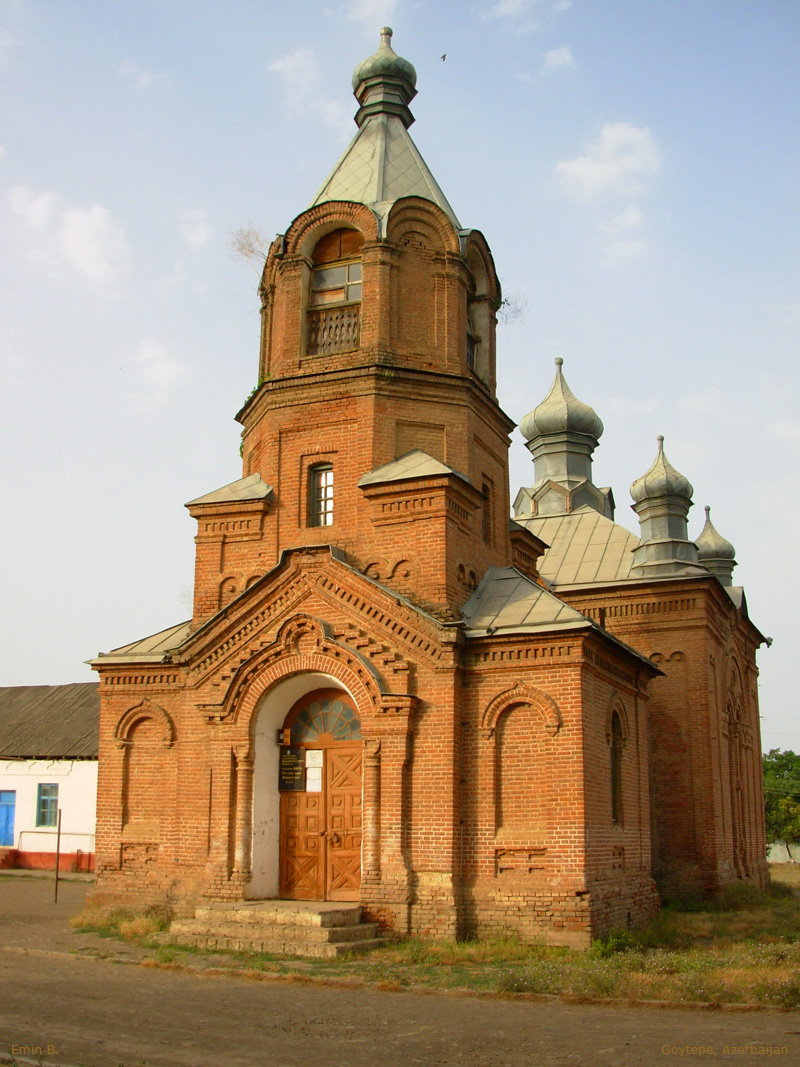
- Type: Church
- Location: Jalilabad District (Azerbaijan), Göytəpə, Jalilabad
- Area: Azerbaijan
- Built: 1878

The Church of Saint Olga is an Orthodox church in the city of Göytepe, Jalilabad District, Azerbaijan, which was built in 1878.

The church was included in the list of immovable historical and cultural monuments of local significance by Decision No. 132 of the Cabinet of Ministers of the Republic of Azerbaijan dated August 2, 2001.

== History ==
After the Russian Empire occupied the Azerbaijani khanates in the 19th century, it began relocating Christians to the region in order to establish a social base of support. In the territory of present-day Jalilabad District, Orthodox peasants were resettled from Russia, and villages such as Astrakhanovka, Tatyanovka, Nikolayevka, Petrovka, and Privolnaya were established for them.In the 1840s, Molokans from the village of Prishib in the Astrakhan Governorate came to the Göytəpə area and founded the village of Prishib here.

In 1864, the relocation of the 33rd Guards Regiment to the Göytəpə area led to the establishment of the village of Mikhaylovskaya, where the regiment’s officers resided. To meet their religious needs, a wooden church was first built in the village. On April 30, 1868, during the celebration of Easter, construction began on a new and larger red-brick church on the site of the wooden one. The foundation-laying ceremony was attended by Mikhail Romanov, the Viceroy of the Caucasus representing the Russian Tsar, and his wife, Olga Fyodorovna. The village of Mikhaylovskaya was later renamed Pravoslavnoye. On June 8, 1898, the villages of Prishib and Pravoslavnoye were merged.

After the Soviet occupation, an official campaign against religion began in Azerbaijan in 1928. Many mosques, churches, and synagogues were handed over to local clubs to be used for educational purposes. The Church of Saint Olga was also closed to worship in 1933.

The church building was later used as a military warehouse and later as a school storage facility.

After Azerbaijan regained its independence, restoration work was carried out at the church between 1995 and 1999. By a resolution of the Cabinet of Ministers of the Republic of Azerbaijan dated August 2, 2001, No. 132, the church was included in the list of immovable historical and cultural monuments of local significance.

The first floor of the church currently houses the Göytepe city library.

== Architecture ==
The church, consisting of six domes, was built by local architects. There once existed an underground passage leading from the church to the priest’s house. However, since it had not been used for a long time, the passage eventually collapsed.

== Sources ==
- Bağırov, Fikrət (2009). Переселенческая политика царизма в Азербайджане. 1830-1914 гг [The resettlement policy of tsarism in Azerbaijan. 1830-1914.] (in Russian). Moskva: Издательство «Маросейка». p. 704.
- Nəsiroğlu, Sabir (2014). Muğan salnaməsi [Mughan Chronicle] (in Azerbaijani). Baku: Alatoran nəşriyyatı. p. 80.
- Yunitski, Aleksandr (1906). История церквей и приходов Бакинской губернии (1815-1905 г. г.) [History of churches and parishes of the Baku province (1815-1905)] (in Russian). Baku: Издание Бакинского Братства законоучителей. p. 192.
- Yunusov, Arif (2004). Azərbaycanda İslam [Islam in Azerbaijan] (PDF) (in Azerbaijani). Baku: Zaman. p. 364. ISBN 9952-8052-2-5. Archived (PDF) from the original on 2023-07-05.
