= Ilyichyovsky =

Ilyichyovsky (Russian: Ильичёвский), rural localities in Russia, may refer to:

- Ilyichyovsky, Kursk Oblast, a khutor
- Ilyichyovsky, Samara Oblast, a settlement
- Ilyichyovsky, Tambov Oblast, a settlement
- Ilyichyovsky, Tatarstan, a settlement

== See also ==
- Ilyichyovka
