= Kuvshinovka =

Kuvshinovka (Russian: Кувшиновка), rural localities in Russia, may refer to:

- Kuvshinovka, Kursk Oblast, a village
- Kuvshinovka, Ulyanovsk Oblast, a village

Also

- Kuvshinovka (river), a tributary of Oklan in the basin of the Penzhina

See also

- Kuvshinovo
