= 2nd Gostomlya =

Rural locality in Kursk Oblast, Russia

2nd Gostomlya 2-я Гостомля
- Village
- Interactive map of 2nd Gostomlya
- Location of 2nd Gostomlya 2nd Gostomlya (Kursk Oblast)
- Coordinates: 51°26′08″N 35°51′46″E
- Country: Russia
- Federal subject: Kursk Oblast
- Administrative district: Medvensky District
- SelsovietSelsoviet: Gostomlyansky

Population (2010 Census)
  - Total: 137
  - Estimate (2010): 137 (0%)

Municipal status
  - Municipal district: Medvensky Municipal District
  - Rural settlement: Gostomlyansky Selsoviet Rural Settlement
- Time zone: UTC+3 (MSK)
- Postal code: 307041
- Dialing code: +7 47146
- OKTMO ID: 38624420106
- Website: gostomlja.ru

2nd Gostomlya or Vtoraya Gostomlya (Russian: 2-я Гостомля, Вторая Гостомля) is a rural locality (Russian: деревня, lit. 'village') in Gostomlyansky Selsoviet Rural Settlement, Medvensky District, Kursk Oblast, Russia. Population: 137 (2010 census); 193 (2002 census);

== Geography ==
The village is located on the Reut River (a left tributary of the Seym), 53 km (33 mi) from the Russia–Ukraine border, 37 km (23 mi) south-west of Kursk, 16 km (9.9 mi) west of the district center – the urban-type settlement Medvenka, 0.8 km (0.50 mi) from the selsoviet center – 1st Gostomlya.

Climate

2nd Gostomlya has a warm-summer humid continental climate (Dfb in the Köppen climate classification).

== Transport ==
2nd Gostomlya is located 15 km (9.3 mi) from the federal route M-2 Crimea Highway (a part of the European route E105), 9 km (5.6 mi) from the road of regional importance 38K-004 (Dyakonovo – Sudzha – border with Ukraine), 4 km (2.5 mi) from the road 38K-009 (M2 Crimea Highway – 38K-004), 12.5 km (7.8 mi) from the road of intermunicipal significance 38H-185 (M2 "Crimea Highway" – Gakhovo), on the roads 38H-195 (38N-185 – 38K-004) and 38H-202 (38K-009 – 2nd Gostomlya), 22.5 km (14.0 mi) from the nearest railway halt 439 km (railway line Lgov I — Kursk).

The rural locality is situated 46 km (29 mi) from Kursk Vostochny Airport, 100 km (62 mi) from Belgorod International Airport and 236 km (147 mi) from Voronezh Peter the Great Airport.
