= Shirokoye =

Shirokoye (Russian: Широкое, 'wide'), rural localities in Russia, may refer to:

- Shirokoye, Arkhangelsk Oblast, a settlement
- Shirokoye, Belgorod Oblast, a selo
- Shirokoye, Kaliningrad Oblast, a settlement
- Shirokoye, Kursk Oblast, a village
- Shirokoye, Orenburg Oblast, a selo
- Shirokoye, Saratov Oblast, a selo
- Shirokoye, Tver Oblast, a village
