= Vorobzha =

Vorobzha (Russian: Воробжа), rural localities in Russia, may refer to:

- Vorobzha, Medvensky District, Kursk Oblast, a khutor
- Vorobzha, Sudzhansky District, Kursk Oblast, a selo

Also

- Vorobzha (river), a left tributary of the Seym River
