= Kondratyevka =

Kondratyevka (Russian: Кондратьевка), rural localities in Russia, may refer to:

- Kondratyevka, Kursk Oblast, a village
- Kondratyevka, Khabarovsk Krai, a selo

See also

- Kondratyev
