= Leninskaya Iskra =

Leninskaya Iskra (Russian: Ленинская Искра), rural localities in Russia, may refer to:

- Leninskaya Iskra, Kirov Oblast, a settlement
- Leninskaya Iskra, Kursk Oblast, a selo
- Leninskaya Iskra, Nizhny Novgorod Oblast, a settlement

== See also ==
- Leninskaya Line
- Leninskaya Sloboda
