= Rozhnovka =

Rozhnovka (Russian: Рожновка), rural localities in Russia, may refer to:

- Rozhnovka, Kursk Oblast, a khutor
- Rozhnovka, Moscow Oblast, a khutor
- Rozhnovka, Yaroslavl Oblast, a village
- Rozhnovka, Voronezh Oblast, a settlement
