= St. Olga's Church =

St. Olga's Church may refer to:

- Church of Saint Olga, Göytepe, Azerbaijan
- St Olga Ukrainian Catholic Church, Peterborough, England
- St. Olga's Church, Warsaw, Poland
