= Spasskoye, Kursk Oblast =

Rural locality in Kursk Oblast, Russia

Spasskoye Спасское
- Village
- Interactive map of Spasskoye
- Location of Spasskoye Spasskoye (Kursk Oblast)
- Coordinates: 51°26′56″N 35°55′26″E
- Country: Russia
- Federal subject: Kursk Oblast
- Administrative district: Medvensky District
- SelsovietSelsoviet: Vysoksky

Population (2010 Census)
  - Total: 328
  - Estimate (2010): 328 (0%)

Municipal status
  - Municipal district: Medvensky Municipal District
  - Rural settlement: Vysoksky Selsoviet Rural Settlement
- Time zone: UTC+3 (MSK)
- Postal code: 307040
- Dialing code: +7 47146
- OKTMO ID: 38624408106
- Website: visoksk.rkursk.ru

Spasskoye (Russian: Спасское) is a rural locality (Russian: деревня, lit. 'village') in Vysoksky Selsoviet Rural Settlement, Medvensky District, Kursk Oblast, Russia. Population: 328 (2010 census); 734 (2002 census);

== Geography ==
The village is located on the Reut River (a left tributary of the Seym), 57 km from the Russia–Ukraine border, 33 km south-west of Kursk, 12 km north-west of the district center – the urban-type settlement Medvenka, 6 km from the selsoviet center – Vysokoye.

Climate

Spasskoye has a warm-summer humid continental climate (Dfb in the Köppen climate classification).

Climate data for Spasskoye
Month	Jan	Feb	Mar	Apr	May	Jun	Jul	Aug	Sep	Oct	Nov	Dec	Year
Mean daily maximum °C (°F)	−4 (25)	−2.9 (26.8)	3 (37)	13 (55)	19.4 (66.9)	22.7 (72.9)	25.2 (77.4)	24.7 (76.5)	18.2 (64.8)	10.6 (51.1)	3.5 (38.3)	−1.1 (30.0)	11.0 (51.8)
Daily mean °C (°F)	−6.1 (21.0)	−5.5 (22.1)	−0.6 (30.9)	8.2 (46.8)	14.7 (58.5)	18.4 (65.1)	20.9 (69.6)	20 (68)	14 (57)	7.3 (45.1)	1.2 (34.2)	−3.1 (26.4)	7.5 (45.4)
Mean daily minimum °C (°F)	−8.5 (16.7)	−8.6 (16.5)	−4.6 (23.7)	2.8 (37.0)	9.1 (48.4)	13 (55)	15.8 (60.4)	14.9 (58.8)	9.7 (49.5)	4 (39)	−1.1 (30.0)	−5.3 (22.5)	3.4 (38.1)
Average precipitation mm (inches)	51 (2.0)	44 (1.7)	47 (1.9)	49 (1.9)	62 (2.4)	69 (2.7)	73 (2.9)	55 (2.2)	57 (2.2)	57 (2.2)	46 (1.8)	49 (1.9)	659 (25.8)
Source: https://en.climate-data.org/asia/russian-federation/kursk-oblast/спасское-681734/

== Transport ==
Spasskoye is located 11 km from the federal route M-2 Crimea Highway (a part of the European route E105), 10 km from the road of regional importance 38K-004 (Dyakonovo – Sudzha – border with Ukraine), 2 km from the road 38K-009 (M2 Crimea Highway – 38K-004), on the roads of intermunicipal significance: 38H-207 (38K-009 – Spasskoye), 38H-061 (1st Gostomlya – Svidnoye – Spasskoye), 38H-587 (Spasskoye – Konstantinovka) and 38H-588 (Spasskoye – Spasskiye Vyselki – Kondratyevskiye Vyselki), 22 km from the nearest railway station Dyakonovo (railway line Lgov I — Kursk).

The rural locality is situated 42 km from Kursk Vostochny Airport, 100 km from Belgorod International Airport and 232 km from Voronezh Peter the Great Airport.
