= Vorobzha, Medvensky District, Kursk Oblast =

Rural locality in Kursk Oblast, Russia

Vorobzha Воробжа
- Khutor
- Interactive map of Vorobzha
- Location of Vorobzha Vorobzha (Kursk Oblast)
- Coordinates: 51°30′34″N 35°56′05″E
- Country: Russia
- Federal subject: Kursk Oblast
- Administrative district: Medvensky District
- SelsovietSelsoviet: Vysoksky

Population (2010 Census)
  - Total: 0
  - Estimate (2010): 0 )

Municipal status
  - Municipal district: Medvensky Municipal District
  - Rural settlement: Vysoksky Selsoviet Rural Settlement
- Time zone: UTC+3 (MSK)
- Postal code: 307040
- Dialing code: +7 47146
- OKTMO ID: 38624408116
- Website: visoksk.rkursk.ru

Vorobzha (Russian: Воробжа) is a rural locality (a khutor) in Vysoksky Selsoviet Rural Settlement, Medvensky District, Kursk Oblast, Russia. Population: 0 (2010 census); 26 (2002 census);

== Geography ==
The khutor is located on the Vorobzha River (a left tributary of the Seym River), 63 km from the Russia–Ukraine border, 27 km south-west of Kursk, 16 km north-west of the district center – the urban-type settlement Medvenka, 10 km from the selsoviet center – Vysokoye.

Climate

Vorobzha has a warm-summer humid continental climate (Dfb in the Köppen climate classification).

== Transport ==
Vorobzha is located 8 km from the federal route M-2 Crimea Highway (a part of the European route E105), 7.5 km from the road of regional importance 38K-004 (Dyakonovo – Sudzha – border with Ukraine), 4 km from the road 38K-009 (M2 Crimea Highway – 38K-004), on the road of intermunicipal significance 38H-203 (38K-009 – Vorobzha), 15.5 km from the nearest railway station Dyakonovo (railway line Lgov I — Kursk).

The rural locality is situated 36 km from Kursk Vostochny Airport, 105 km from Belgorod International Airport and 231 km from Voronezh Peter the Great Airport.
