= Krasnovka =

Krasnovka (Russian: Красновка), rural localities in Russia, may refer to:

- Krasnovka, Bryansk Oblast, a village
- Krasnovka, Kursk Oblast, a khutor
- Krasnovka, Krasnoyarsk Krai, a village
- Krasnovka, Chernyakhovsky District, Kaliningrad Oblast, a settlement
- Krasnovka, Zelenogradsky District, Kaliningrad Oblast, a settlement
- Krasnovka, Lebedyansky District, Lipetsk Oblast, a village
- Krasnovka, Terbunsky District, Lipetsk Oblast, a village
- Krasnovka, Kulebaksky District, Nizhny Novgorod Oblast, a village
- Krasnovka, Sharangsky District, Nizhny Novgorod Oblast, a village
- Krasnovka, Chulymsky District, Novosibirsk Oblast, a settlement
- Krasnovka, Kuybyshevsky District, Novosibirsk Oblast, a village
- Krasnovka, Kamensky District, Rostov Oblast, a khutor
- Krasnovka, Tarasovsky District, Rostov Oblast, a khutor
- Krasnovka, Samara Oblast, a village
- Krasnovka, Tambov Oblast, a village
