= Lieutenant prose =

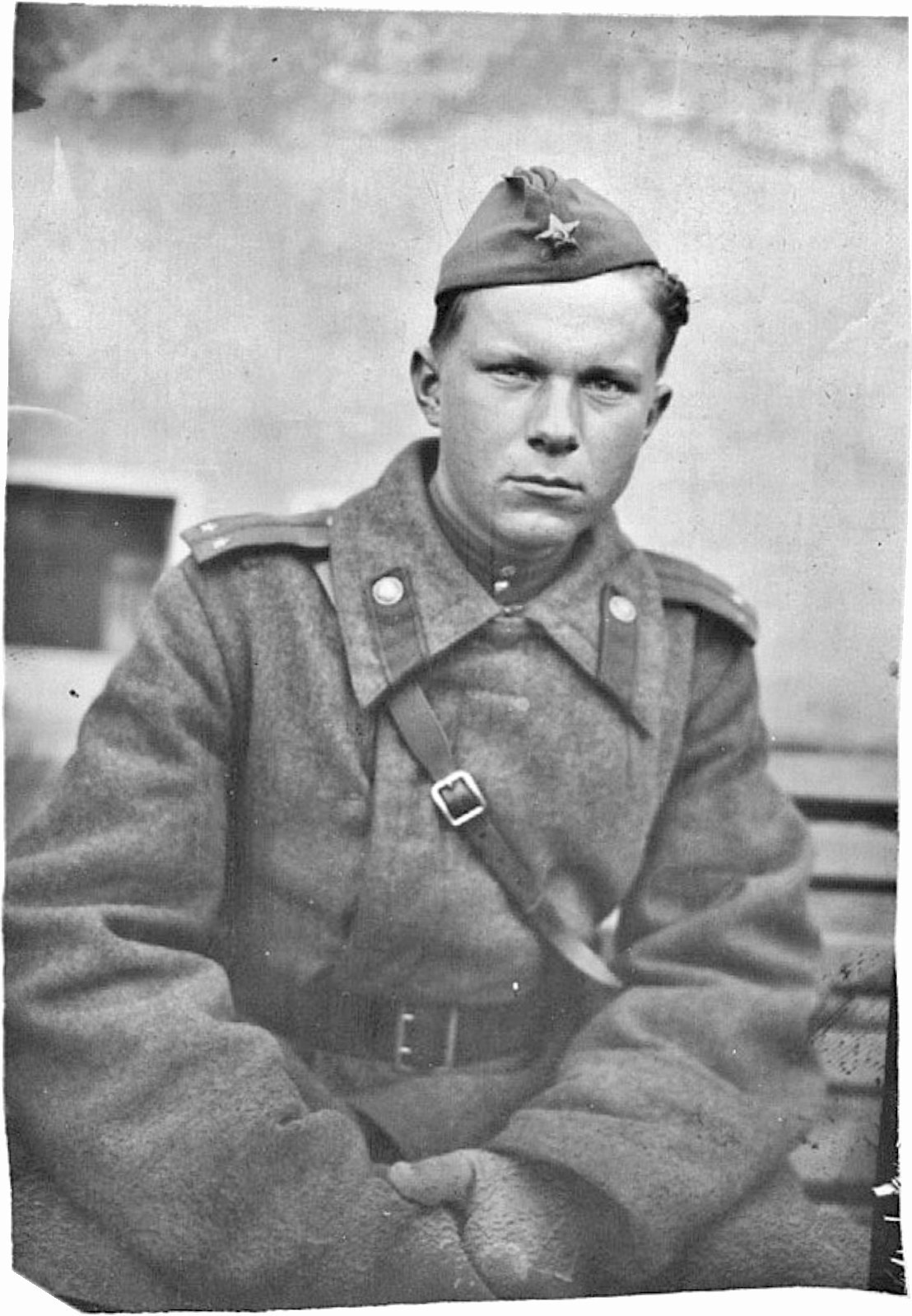
Photograph of Vasil Bykov in 1944

Lieutenant prose (Russian: лейтенантская проза) is the body of Russian military fiction penned by former junior officers of the Red Army who drew on their personal experiences during World War II. In "lieutenant prose" protagonists were often (though not always) the junior officers. The war is shown without the semi-official pathos and smoothing of sharp points. "Lieutenant prose" emphasizes not the scale of military actions, panoramic battles with many nameless faces and figures of military leaders, but places individual junior officers in the foreground, often depicting their great courage in extreme situations.

The main representatives of the "lieutenant prose" include Viktor Nekrasov, Grigory Baklanov, Yuri Bondarev, Vasil Bykov, Konstantin Vorobyov, Vyacheslav Kondratyev, Viktor Kurochkin, Boris Vasilyev.
