= Konstantin Vorobyov (writer) =

Konstantin Dmitrievich Vorobyov
- Born: September 24, 1919; Nizhny Reutets, Kursk Governorate, Russian SFSR
- Died: March 2, 1975 (aged 55); Vilnius, Lithuanian SSR, Soviet Union
- Writing career
- Period: mid-1940s – 1970s
- Genres: fiction, memoirs, lieutenant prose
- Subject: Great Patriotic War
- Notable works: The Scream (1962); Slain Near Moscow (1963)

Konstantin Dmitrievich Vorobyov (Russian: Константи́н Дми́триевич Воробьёв; September 24, 1919, Nizhny Reutets – March 2, 1975, Vilnius) was a Soviet writer, a War hero and a major exponent of the lieutenant prose movement in the Soviet war literature. Vorobyov, who was born in the Kursk region, Soviet Russia but spent most of his life in Vilnius, Lithuania (then in the USSR; also his death place), wrote 10 short novels (best known is Slain Near Moscow, 1963) and 30 short stories, many of which were either unpublished in his lifetime or suffered greatly from massive censorial cuts. According to the poet, critic and literature historian Dmitry Bykov, Vorobyov was "the most American of all Russian writers, a strange mix of Hemingway and Capote".

== Select bibliography ==
- And Now Enters the Giant (Vot prishol velikan, Вот пришел великан, 1971)
- Genka, Brother of Mine (Genka, brat moi, Генка, брат мой, 1969)
- ...And to All of Your Kin (...I vsemu rodu tvoyemu, ...И всему роду твоему, 1975, unfinished)
- The Scream (Krik, Крик, 1962)
- In One Breath (Odnim dykhaniyev, Одним дыханием, 1948, published in 1967)
- How Much Is Joy in Ratikny (Pochom v Rakitnom radosti, Почём в Ракитном радости, 1964)
- Slain Near Moscow (Ubity pod Moskvoi, Убиты под Москвой, 1963)
- Here We Are, My Lord!.. (Eto mi, Gospodi!.., Это мы, господи!.., 1986, posthumously)
