= Sadovy, Nizhnereutchansky Selsoviet, Medvensky District, Kursk Oblast =

Rural locality in Kursk Oblast, Russia

Sadovy Садовый
- Khutor
- Interactive map of Sadovy
- Location of Sadovy Sadovy (Kursk Oblast)
- Coordinates: 51°24′39″N 36°10′02″E
- Country: Russia
- Federal subject: Kursk Oblast
- Administrative district: Medvensky District
- SelsovietSelsoviet: Nizhnereutchansky

Population (2010 Census)
  - Total: 82
  - Estimate (2010): 82 (0%)

Municipal status
  - Municipal district: Medvensky Municipal District
  - Rural settlement: Nizhnereutchansky Selsoviet Rural Settlement
- Time zone: UTC+3 (MSK)
- Postal code: 307030
- Dialing code: +7 47146
- OKTMO ID: 38624436156
- Website: nizhnezeut.rkursk.ru

Sadovy (Russian: Садовый) is a rural locality (a khutor) in Nizhnereutchansky Selsoviet Rural Settlement, Medvensky District, Kursk Oblast, Russia. Population: 82 (2010 census); 111 (2002 census);

== Geography ==
The khutor is located on the Medvenka (a.k.a. Medvensky Kolodez) Brook (a left tributary of the Polnaya in the basin of the Seym), 67 km from the Russia–Ukraine border, 33 km south of Kursk, 1 km east of the district center – the urban-type settlement Medvenka, 10.5 km from the selsoviet center – Nizhny Reutets.

Climate

Sadovy has a warm-summer humid continental climate (Dfb in the Köppen climate classification).

== Transport ==
Sadovy is located 2 km from the federal route M-2 Crimea Highway (a part of the European route E105), on the road of intermunicipal significance 38H-251 (M2 "Crimea Highway" – Sadovy), 27 km from the nearest railway halt 457 km (railway line Lgov I — Kursk).

The rural locality is situated 39 km from Kursk Vostochny Airport, 89 km from Belgorod International Airport and 216 km from Voronezh Peter the Great Airport.
