= Paniki, Kursk Oblast =

Rural locality in Kursk Oblast, Russia

Paniki Паники
- Selo
- Interactive map of Paniki
- Location of Paniki Paniki (Kursk Oblast)
- Coordinates: 51°22′04″N 36°11′37″E
- Country: Russia
- Federal subject: Kursk Oblast
- Administrative district: Medvensky District
- SelsovietSelsoviet: Panikinsky

Population (2010 Census)
  - Total: 841
  - Estimate (2010): 841 (0%)

Administrative status
  - Capital of: Panikinsky Selsoviet

Municipal status
  - Municipal district: Medvensky Municipal District
  - Rural settlement: Panikinsky Selsoviet Rural Settlement
  - Capital of: Panikinsky Selsoviet Rural Settlement
- Time zone: UTC+3 (MSK)
- Postal code: 307054
- Dialing code: +7 47146
- OKTMO ID: 38624440101
- Website: panikiss.rkursk.ru

Paniki (Russian: Паники) is a rural locality (Russian: село, lit. 'village') and the administrative center of Panikinsky Selsoviet Rural Settlement, Medvensky District, Kursk Oblast, Russia. Population: 841 (2010 census); 868 (2002 census);

== Geography ==
The village is located on the Paniki Brook (a left tributary of the Polnaya in the basin of the Seym), 65 km (40 mi) from the Russia–Ukraine border, 38 km (24 mi) south of Kursk, 6.5 km (4.0 mi) south-east of the district center – the urban-type settlement Medvenka.

Streets

There are the following streets in the locality: 1st Brigada, 3rd Brigada, 5th Brigada, 6th Brigada, 7th Brigada, Koptevka, Molodyozhnaya and Shelkovskaya (381 houses).

Climate

Paniki has a warm-summer humid continental climate (Dfb in the Köppen climate classification).

Climate data for Paniki
Month	Jan	Feb	Mar	Apr	May	Jun	Jul	Aug	Sep	Oct	Nov	Dec	Year
Mean daily maximum °C (°F)	−4.1 (24.6)	−3 (27)	2.9 (37.2)	13 (55)	19.3 (66.7)	22.6 (72.7)	25.3 (77.5)	24.6 (76.3)	18.2 (64.8)	10.6 (51.1)	3.4 (38.1)	−1.2 (29.8)	11.0 (51.7)
Daily mean °C (°F)	−6.2 (20.8)	−5.7 (21.7)	−0.8 (30.6)	8.2 (46.8)	14.7 (58.5)	18.3 (64.9)	20.9 (69.6)	20 (68)	14 (57)	7.2 (45.0)	1.1 (34.0)	−3.1 (26.4)	7.4 (45.3)
Mean daily minimum °C (°F)	−8.7 (16.3)	−8.8 (16.2)	−4.9 (23.2)	2.7 (36.9)	9 (48)	12.9 (55.2)	15.7 (60.3)	14.8 (58.6)	9.7 (49.5)	3.9 (39.0)	−1.2 (29.8)	−5.3 (22.5)	3.3 (38.0)
Average precipitation mm (inches)	50 (2.0)	44 (1.7)	48 (1.9)	49 (1.9)	62 (2.4)	69 (2.7)	73 (2.9)	53 (2.1)	57 (2.2)	57 (2.2)	46 (1.8)	50 (2.0)	658 (25.8)
Source: https://en.climate-data.org/asia/russian-federation/kursk-oblast/паники-290762/

== Transport ==
Paniki is located 2 km (1.2 mi) from the federal route M-2 Crimea Highway (a part of the European route E105), on the roads of intermunicipal significance 38H-229 ("Crimea Highway" – Paniki – Drachyovka) and 38H-231 ("Crimea Highway" – Paniki – 38N-229), 32 km (20 mi) from the nearest railway halt 457 km (railway line Lgov I — Kursk).

The rural locality is situated 43 km (27 mi) from Kursk Vostochny Airport, 84 km (52 mi) from Belgorod International Airport and 216 km (134 mi) from Voronezh Peter the Great Airport.
