= Leninskaya Iskra, Kursk Oblast =

Rural locality in Kursk Oblast, Russia

Leninskaya Iskra Ленинская Искра
- Selo
- Interactive map of Leninskaya Iskra
- Location of Leninskaya Iskra Leninskaya Iskra (Kursk Oblast)
- Coordinates: 51°24′58″N 36°02′54″E
- Country: Russia
- Federal subject: Kursk Oblast
- Administrative district: Medvensky District
- SelsovietSelsoviet: Vysoksky

Population (2010 Census)
  - Total: 112
  - Estimate (2010): 112 (0%)

Municipal status
  - Municipal district: Medvensky Municipal District
  - Rural settlement: Vysoksky Selsoviet Rural Settlement
- Time zone: UTC+3 (MSK)
- Postal code: 307043
- Dialing code: +7 47146
- OKTMO ID: 38624408156
- Website: visoksk.rkursk.ru

Leninskaya Iskra (Russian: Ленинская Искра) is a rural locality (Russian: село, lit. 'village') in Vysoksky Selsoviet Rural Settlement, Medvensky District, Kursk Oblast, Russia. Population: 112 (2010 census); 146 (2002 census);

== Geography ==
The village is located on the Reut River (a left tributary of the Seym), 61 km from the Russia–Ukraine border, 33.5 km south-west of Kursk, 4 km west of the district center – the urban-type settlement Medvenka, 2.5 km from the selsoviet center – Vysokoye.

Climate

Leninskaya Iskra has a warm-summer humid continental climate (Dfb in the Köppen climate classification).

== Transport ==
Leninskaya Iskra is located 6 km from the federal route M-2 Crimea Highway (a part of the European route E105), on the road of intermunicipal significance 38H-223 (M2 "Crimea Highway" – Leninskaya Iskra – Vysokoye), 25.5 km from the nearest railway halt and passing loop 454 km (railway line Lgov I — Kursk).

The rural locality is situated 41 km from Kursk Vostochny Airport, 93 km from Belgorod International Airport and 225 km from Voronezh Peter the Great Airport.
