= Viktor Nekrasov =

Soviet writer, journalist and editor

Viktor Platonovich Nekrasov
- Виктор Платонович Некрасов
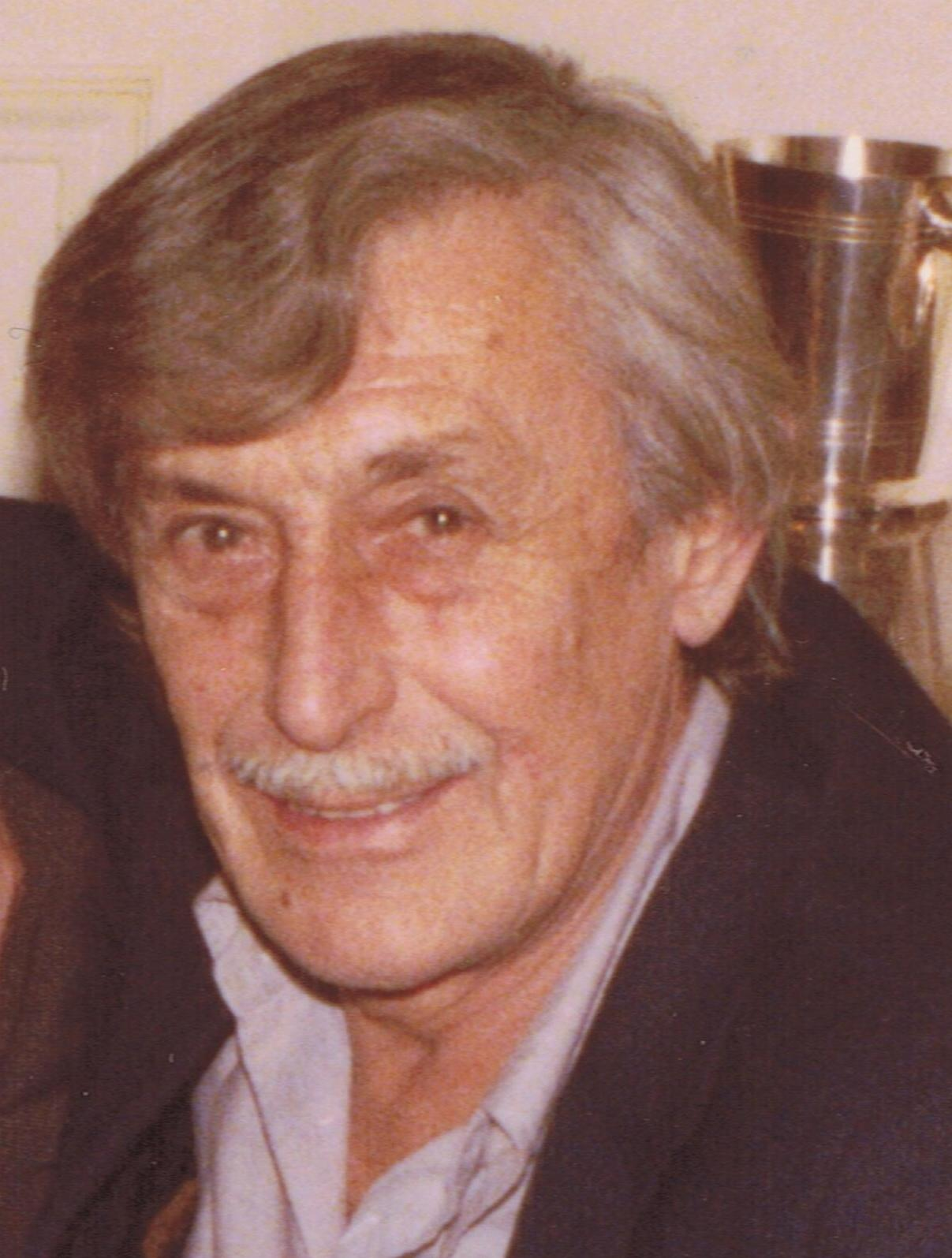
- Nekrasov in 1978
- Born: June 17, 1911; Kiev, Russian Empire
- Died: September 3, 1987 (aged 76); Paris, France
- Writing career
- Language: Russian
- Notable awards: USSR State Prize
- Literary movement: Lieutenant Prose

Viktor Platonovich Nekrasov (Russian: Ви́ктор Плато́нович Некра́сов, Viktor Platonovič Nekrasov; 17 June 1911, in Kiev – 3 September 1987, in Paris) was a Soviet writer, journalist and editor.

== Biography ==
Nekrasov was born in Kiev and graduated with a degree in architecture in 1936. Between 1937 and 1941, he was an actor and set designer with the Kiev Russian Drama Theater. During World War II, he served in the Red Army (1941–1944), reaching the rank of captain, and fought in the Battle of Stalingrad. As for many writers of his generation, the war was a formative experience for Nekrasov: in addition to combat, the close comradeship he observed there among soldiers of different backgrounds and classes changed his understanding of Soviet society. As Michael Falchikov writes, "Nekrasov 'discovered' the peasantry by fighting alongside them." After the war he became a journalist and based his first book Front-line Stalingrad (V okopakh Stalingrada, literal translation In the trenches of Stalingrad, 1946) on his experiences there. The novel was awarded the USSR State Prize for literature in 1947.

After Joseph Stalin's death in 1953, Nekrasov took advantage of the first wave of destalinization to publish In the Home Town (1954), a novel which marked a departure from the Stalin-era socialist realism in Soviet literature. His later works, especially his novel Kira Georgievna (1961), are markedly anti-Stalinist. In 1959 he was the first Soviet writer to openly call for a monument to be built at Baby Yar. A travelogue of his experiences in Italy in 1957 and the United States in 1960, Both Sides of the Ocean, which was unusually open for its time, was published in 1962 and denounced by Nikita Khrushchev in 1963.

After Khruschev's ouster in October 1964, Nekrasov joined other Soviet intellectuals in protesting what he saw as the new government's gradual restoration of Stalinism. He signed numerous open letters protesting government policies in 1966-1973 and was expelled from the Communist Party of the Soviet Union in 1973. In 1974 he emigrated to France, where he became an associate editor of the emigre magazine Kontinent. While in exile, he wrote an autobiography, Newspaper of a Peculiar One (1976), and a novel, Those of the Front (1978). In 1979, after he had made some ironic marks on Brezhnev's trilogy, Nekrasov's Soviet citizenship was revoked. He died in Paris and was buried in Sainte-Geneviève-des-Bois Russian Cemetery, in the southern suburbs of Paris.

== Works in English translation ==
- Kira Georgievna. Tr. Walter N. Vickery, New York, Pantheon Books [1962], 183p.
- Front-line Stalingrad. Tr. David Floyd, London, Harvill Press, [1962], 320 p.
- The Perch. Tr. Vic Shneerson, in The Third Flare: Three War Stories, Moscow, Foreign Languages Pub. House, [1963], 229p.
- Both Sides of the Ocean; a Russian Writer's Travels in Italy and the United States, New York, Holt, Rinehart and Winston, [1964], xv, 191p.
- Postscripts, Tr. Michael G. Falchikov; Quartet Books/Namara Group, London, [1991], 201p.

== Sources ==
- "Nekrasov, Viktor" in Encyclopedia of Ukraine, Vol. 3, Toronto, University of Toronto Press, 1993.
- De Boer, S. P.; Driessen, Evert; Verhaar, Hendrik (1982). "Nekrasov, Viktor Platonovič". Biographical dictionary of dissidents in the Soviet Union: 1956–1975. The Hague: Martinus Nijhoff Publishers. pp. 391–392. ISBN 9024725380.
