= Göytəpə, Jalilabad =

Göytəpə
- Municipality
- Location within Azerbaijan
- Coordinates: 39°07′00″N 48°35′43″E
- Country: Azerbaijan
- Rayon: Jalilabad

Population (2025)
  - Total: 15,200
- Time zone: UTC+4 (AZT)

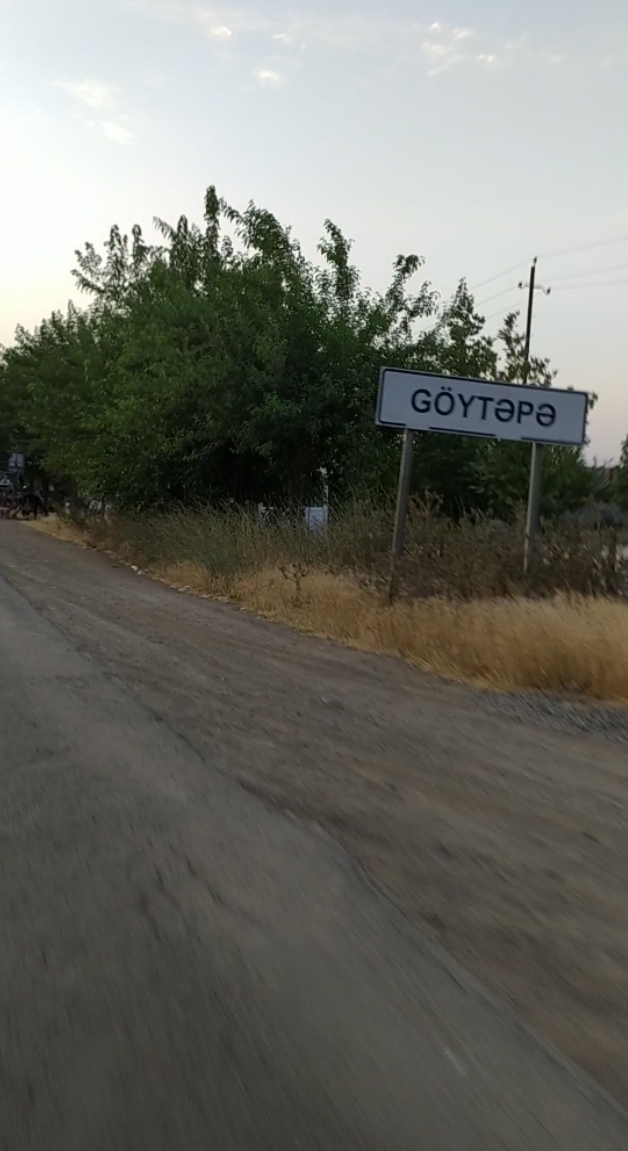
Road sign at the entrance to Göytəpə

Göytəpə (also, Goytepe, Göytäpä, Prišib, Prishib, Prishibinsk, Prishibinskoe, and Prishibinskoye) — is a city and the second most populous municipality, after the capital Cəlilabad, in the Jalilabad District of Azerbaijan. As of 2025, it has a population of 15,200. Renamed in 1992, "Göytəpə" in Azerbaijani means "Blue Hill."

== Notable natives ==
- Vugar Mursalov — National Hero of Azerbaijan.

== Wildlife ==
The Caspian tiger was historically found in the Caucasus, before the end of the 20th century. In particular, an "immense" tiger—as documented by Heptner and Sludskii ( in 1972)—was killed in Prishibinsk in 1899.

== See also ==
- Trans-Caucasus
- Jalilabad District (Azerbaijan)
