= Samsonovo, Ivanovo Oblast =

Samsonovo Самсоново
- Village
- Location within Ivanovo Oblast Location within Russia
- Coordinates: 56°52′N 41°02′E
- Country: Russia
- Region: Ivanovo Oblast
- District: Ivanovsky District
- Time zone: UTC+3:00

Samsonovo (Russian: Самсоново) is a rural locality (a village) in Ivanovsky District, Ivanovo Oblast, Russia. Population: 17 (2010 census);

== Geography ==
This rural locality is located 14 kilometres (8.7 mi) from Ivanovo (the district's administrative centre and capital of Ivanovo Oblast) and 242 kilometres (150 mi) from Moscow. Stromikhino is the nearest rural locality.
