= Tatyanovka, Republic of Bashkortostan =

Tatyanovka Татьяновка
- Village
- Location within Bashkortostan Location within Russia
- Coordinates: 53°20′N 56°13′E
- Country: Russia
- Region: Bashkortostan
- District: Ishimbaysky District
- Time zone: UTC+5:00

Tatyanovka (Russian: Татья́новка) is a rural locality (a village) in Itkulovsky Selsoviet, Ishimbaysky District, Bashkortostan, Russia. The population was 15 as of 2010. There are 3 streets.

== Geography ==
Tatyanovka is located 27 km southeast of Ishimbay (the district's administrative centre) by road. Osipovka is the nearest rural locality.
