= Samsonovo =

Samsonovo Самсоново
- Selo
- Location within Altai Krai Location within Russia
- Coordinates: 52°07′N 82°42′E
- Country: Russia
- Region: Altai Krai
- District: Shipunovsky District
- Time zone: UTC+7:00

Samsonovo (Russian: Самсоново) is a rural locality (a selo) and the administrative center of Samsonovsky Selsoviet, Shipunovsky District, Altai Krai, Russia. The population was 750 as of 2013. There are 11 streets.

== Geography ==
Samsonovo is located 41 km ESE of Shipunovo (the district's administrative centre) by road. Chupino is the nearest rural locality.
