= Ilyichyovka =

Ilyichyovka Ильичёво
- Settlement
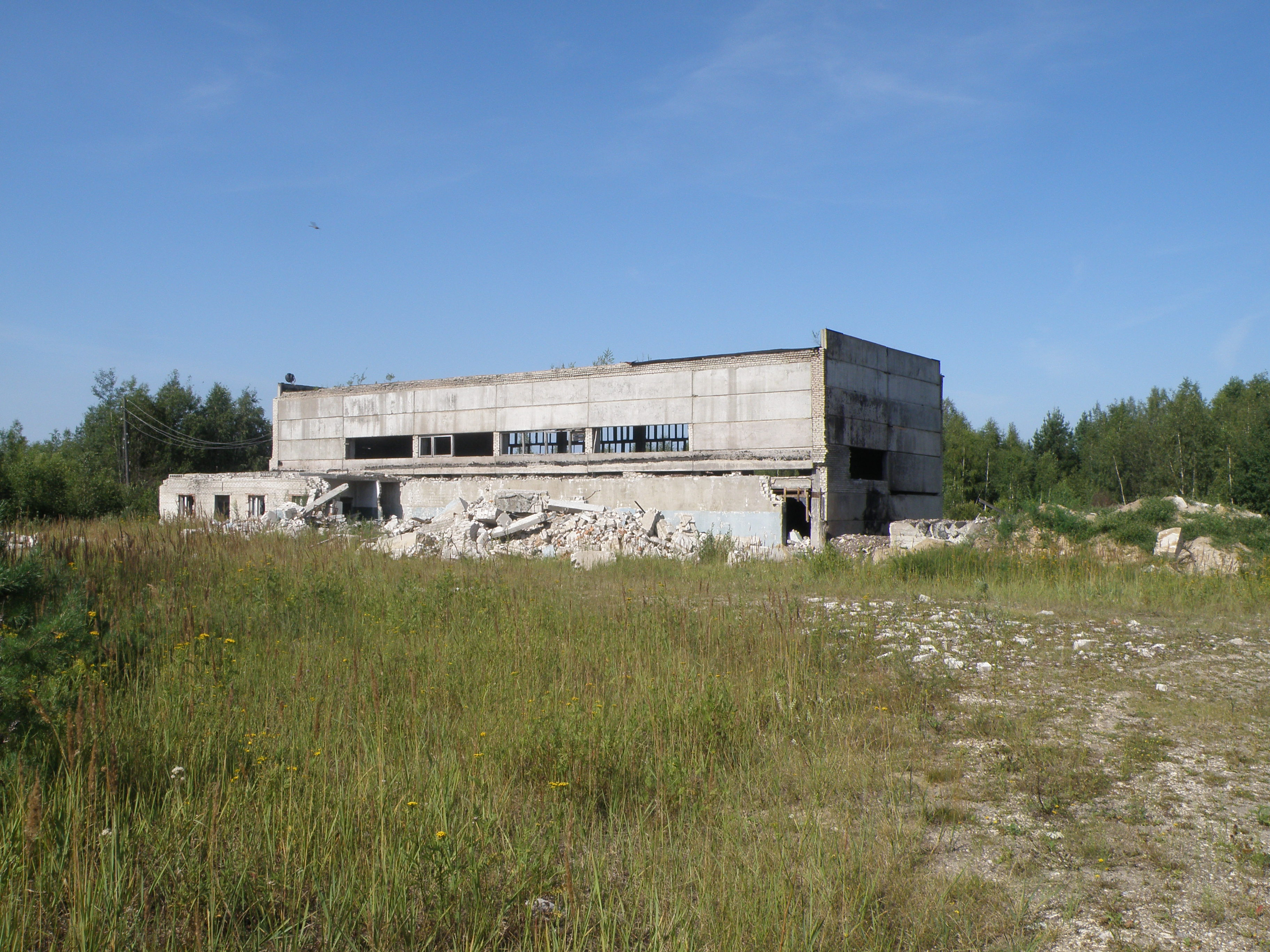
- Ilyichyovka ruin.jpg

- Location within Vladimir Oblast Location within Russia
- Coordinates: 55°30′N 40°18′E
- Country: Russia
- Region: Vladimir Oblast
- District: Gus-Khrustalny District
- Time zone: UTC+3:00

Ilyichyovka (Russian: Ильичёво) is a rural locality (a settlement) in Demidovskoye Rural Settlement, Gus-Khrustalny District, Vladimir Oblast, Russia. The population was 222 as of 2010.

== Geography ==
Ilyichyovka is located 36 km southwest of Gus-Khrustalny (the district's administrative centre) by road. Kuzmino is the nearest rural locality.
