= Samsonov =

Samsonov (Russian: Самсо́нов) and Samsonova (Russian: Самсо́нова; feminine) is a Russian surname derived from the name Samson. Currently, there are many variations in the name including Samsonov, Samsonenko, Samsonychev, Samsonyan, Samsikov, Samsonkin, and Samsononychev. In the United States, it is often spelled Samsonoff.

Notable people with the surname include:

- Alexander Samsonov (1859–1914), Russian military commander during World War I
- Aleksandr Samsonov (born 1953), Russian Olympic swimmer
- Artyom Samsonov (footballer, born 1994), Russian footballer
- Artyom Samsonov (footballer, born 1989), Russian footballer
- Daniil Samsonov (born 2005), Russian figure skater
- Ilya Samsonov (born 1997), Russian ice hockey player
- Liudmila Samsonova (born 1998), Russian female tennis player
- Oleg Samsonov (born 1987), Russian soccer player
- Samson Samsonov (1921–2002), Soviet and Russian film director and screenwriter
- Sergei Samsonov (born 1978), professional ice hockey player
- Tamara Samsonova (born 1947), Russian murderer and suspected serial killer
- Viktor Samsonov (1941-2024), acting Chief of the General Staff of the Armed Forces of the Russian Federation in 1996
- Vladimir Samsonov (born 1976), Belarusian professional table tennis player
- Yevgeny Samsonov (1926–2014), Soviet rower
- Zinaida Samsonova (1924–1944), medic and posthumous Hero of the Soviet Union
