= Samsonovo, Vologda Oblast =

Samsonovo Самсоново
- Village
- Location within Vologda Oblast Location within Russia
- Coordinates: 58°44′N 36°07′E
- Country: Russia
- Region: Vologda Oblast
- District: Ustyuzhensky District
- Time zone: UTC+3:00

Samsonovo (Russian: Самсоново) is a rural locality (a village) in Zalesskoye Rural Settlement, Ustyuzhensky District, Vologda Oblast, Russia. The population was 3 as of 2002.

== Geography ==
Samsonovo is located 30 km (19 mi) southwest of Ustyuzhna (the district's administrative centre) by road. Glukhovo-1 is the nearest rural locality.
