= 1st Gostomlya =

Rural locality in Kursk Oblast, Russia

1st Gostomlya 1-я Гостомля
- Selo
- Interactive map of 1st Gostomlya
- Location of 1st Gostomlya 1st Gostomlya (Kursk Oblast)
- Coordinates: 51°26′40″N 35°51′14″E
- Country: Russia
- Federal subject: Kursk Oblast
- Administrative district: Medvensky District
- SelsovietSelsoviet: Gostomlyansky

Population (2010 Census)
  - Total: 290
  - Estimate (2010): 290 (0%)

Administrative status
  - Capital of: Gostomlyansky Selsoviet

Municipal status
  - Municipal district: Medvensky Municipal District
  - Rural settlement: Gostomlyansky Selsoviet Rural Settlement
  - Capital of: Gostomlyansky Selsoviet Rural Settlement
- Time zone: UTC+3 (MSK)
- Postal code: 307041
- Dialing code: +7 47146
- OKTMO ID: 38624420101
- Website: gostomlja.ru

1st Gostomlya or Pervaya Gostomlya (Russian: 1-я Гостомля, Первая Гостомля) is a rural locality (Russian: село, lit. 'village') and the administrative center of Gostomlyansky Selsoviet Rural Settlement, Medvensky District, Kursk Oblast, Russia. Population: 290 (2010 census); 354 (2002 census);

== Geography ==
The village is located on the Reut River (a left tributary of the Seym), 54 km (34 mi) from the Russia–Ukraine border, 36 km (22 mi) south-west of Kursk, 17 km (11 mi) north-west of the district center – the urban-type settlement Medvenka.

Climate

1st Gostomlya has a warm-summer humid continental climate (Dfb in the Köppen climate classification).

Climate data for 1st Gostomlya
Month	Jan	Feb	Mar	Apr	May	Jun	Jul	Aug	Sep	Oct	Nov	Dec	Year
Mean daily maximum °C (°F)	−4 (25)	−2.9 (26.8)	3 (37)	13 (55)	19.4 (66.9)	22.7 (72.9)	25.2 (77.4)	24.7 (76.5)	18.2 (64.8)	10.6 (51.1)	3.5 (38.3)	−1.1 (30.0)	11.0 (51.8)
Daily mean °C (°F)	−6.1 (21.0)	−5.5 (22.1)	−0.6 (30.9)	8.2 (46.8)	14.7 (58.5)	18.4 (65.1)	20.9 (69.6)	20 (68)	14 (57)	7.3 (45.1)	1.2 (34.2)	−3.1 (26.4)	7.5 (45.4)
Mean daily minimum °C (°F)	−8.5 (16.7)	−8.6 (16.5)	−4.6 (23.7)	2.8 (37.0)	9.1 (48.4)	13 (55)	15.8 (60.4)	14.9 (58.8)	9.7 (49.5)	4 (39)	−1.1 (30.0)	−5.3 (22.5)	3.4 (38.1)
Average precipitation mm (inches)	52 (2.0)	44 (1.7)	48 (1.9)	50 (2.0)	64 (2.5)	71 (2.8)	75 (3.0)	56 (2.2)	58 (2.3)	58 (2.3)	47 (1.9)	49 (1.9)	672 (26.5)
Source: https://en.climate-data.org/asia/russian-federation/kursk-oblast/1-я-гостомля-681740/

== Transport ==
1st Gostomlya is located 16 km (9.9 mi) from the federal route M-2 Crimea Highway (a part of the European route E105), 8 km (5.0 mi) from the road of regional importance 38K-004 (Dyakonovo – Sudzha – border with Ukraine), 3.5 km (2.2 mi) from the road 38K-009 (M2 Crimea Highway – 38K-004), on the roads of intermunicipal significance 38H-202 (38K-009 – 2nd Gostomlya) and 38H-061 (1st Gostomlya – Svidnoye – Spasskoye), 21.5 km (13.4 mi) from the nearest railway halt 439 km (railway line Lgov I — Kursk).

The rural locality is situated 45 km (28 mi) from Kursk Vostochny Airport, 102 km (63 mi) from Belgorod International Airport and 237 km (147 mi) from Voronezh Peter the Great Airport.
