= Nizhny Reutets =

Rural locality in Kursk Oblast, Russia

Nizhny Reutets Нижний Реутец
- Selo
- Interactive map of Nizhny Reutets
- Location of Nizhny Reutets Nizhny Reutets (Kursk Oblast)
- Coordinates: 51°22′45″N 36°01′36″E
- Country: Russia
- Federal subject: Kursk Oblast
- Administrative district: Medvensky District
- SelsovietSelsoviet: Nizhnereutchansky

Population (2010 Census)
  - Total: 423
  - Estimate (2010): 423 (0%)

Administrative status
  - Capital of: Nizhnereutchansky Selsoviet

Municipal status
  - Municipal district: Medvensky Municipal District
  - Rural settlement: Nizhnereutchansky Selsoviet Rural Settlement
  - Capital of: Nizhnereutchansky Selsoviet Rural Settlement
- Time zone: UTC+3 (MSK)
- Postal code: 307047
- Dialing code: +7 47146
- OKTMO ID: 38624436101
- Website: nizhnezeut.rkursk.ru

Nizhny Reutets (Russian: Нижний Реутец) is a rural locality (Russian: село, lit. 'village') and the administrative center of Nizhnereutchansky Selsoviet Rural Settlement, Medvensky District, Kursk Oblast, Russia. Population: 423 (2010 census); 449 (2002 census);

== Geography ==
The village is located on the Reutets River (a left tributary of the Reut River in the Seym basin), 57 km from the Russia–Ukraine border, 38 km south-west of Kursk, 6.5 km south-west of the district center – the urban-type settlement Medvenka.

Climate

Nizhny Reutets has a warm-summer humid continental climate (Dfb in the Köppen climate classification).

== Transport ==
Nizhny Reutets is located 8 km from the federal route M-2 Crimea Highway (a part of the European route E105), on the roads of intermunicipal significance: 38H-185 (M2 "Crimea Highway" – Gakhovo), 38H-186 (38N-185 – Alexandrowka), 38H-187 (38N-186 – the estate of the writer Konstantin Vorobyov) and 38H-190 (38N-185 – Ilyichyovsky), 30 km from the nearest railway halt and passing loop 454 km (railway line Lgov I — Kursk).

The rural locality is situated 45 km from Kursk Vostochny Airport, 89 km from Belgorod International Airport and 227 km from Voronezh Peter the Great Airport.

== Born in the selo ==
- Konstantin Dmitrievich Vorobyov (1919–1975) – a Soviet writer, a war hero and a major exponent of the lieutenant prose movement in the Soviet war literature.
