= 2nd Kitayevka =

Rural locality in Kursk Oblast, Russia

2nd Kitayevka 2-я Китаевка
- Village
- Interactive map of 2nd Kitayevka
- Location of 2nd Kitayevka 2nd Kitayevka (Kursk Oblast)
- Coordinates: 51°29′24″N 36°20′26″E
- Country: Russia
- Federal subject: Kursk Oblast
- Administrative district: Medvensky District
- SelsovietSelsoviet: Kitayevsky

Population (2010 Census)
  - Total: 85
  - Estimate (2010): 85 (0%)

Administrative status
  - Capital of: Kitayevsky Selsoviet

Municipal status
  - Municipal district: Medvensky Municipal District
  - Rural settlement: Kitayevsky Selsoviet Rural Settlement
  - Capital of: Kitayevsky Selsoviet Rural Settlement
- Time zone: UTC+3 (MSK)
- Postal code: 307052
- Dialing code: +7 47146
- OKTMO ID: 38624424101
- Website: kitayss.rkursk.ru

2nd Kitayevka or Vtoraya Kitayevka (Russian: 2-я Китаевка, Вторая Китаевка) is a rural locality (Russian: деревня, lit. 'village') and the administrative center of Kitayevsky Selsoviet Rural Settlement, Medvensky District, Kursk Oblast, Russia. Population: 85 (2010 census); 100 (2002 census);

== Geography ==
The village is located on the Galichy Brook (a left tributary of the Polnaya in the basin of the Seym), 82 km (51 mi) from the Russia–Ukraine border, 27 km (17 mi) south-east of Kursk, 16 km (9.9 mi) north-east of the district center – the urban-type settlement Medvenka.

Climate

2nd Kitayevka has a warm-summer humid continental climate (Dfb in the Köppen climate classification).

== Transport ==
2nd Kitayevka is located 15.5 km (9.6 mi) from the federal route M-2 Crimea Highway (a part of the European route E105), 7 km (4.3 mi) from the road of intermunicipal significance 38H-236 (M2 "Crimea Highway" – Polevaya), on the road 38H-237 (M2 "Crimea Highway" – Polny – 38N-236), 17.5 km (10.9 mi) from the nearest railway halt Kolodnoye (railway line Klyukva — Belgorod).

The rural locality is situated 29 km (18 mi) from Kursk Vostochny Airport, 95 km (59 mi) from Belgorod International Airport and 203 km (126 mi) from Voronezh Peter the Great Airport.
