= Vysokoye, Medvensky District, Kursk Oblast =

Rural locality in Kursk Oblast, Russia

Vysokoye Высокое
- Selo
- Interactive map of Vysokoye
- Location of Vysokoye Vysokoye (Kursk Oblast)
- Coordinates: 51°26′00″N 35°59′10″E
- Country: Russia
- Federal subject: Kursk Oblast
- Administrative district: Medvensky District
- SelsovietSelsoviet: Vysoksky

Population (2010 Census)
  - Total: 457
  - Estimate (2010): 457 (0%)

Administrative status
  - Capital of: Vysoksky Selsoviet

Municipal status
  - Municipal district: Medvensky Municipal District
  - Rural settlement: Vysoksky Selsoviet Rural Settlement
  - Capital of: Vysoksky Selsoviet Rural Settlement
- Time zone: UTC+3 (MSK)
- Postal code: 307043
- Dialing code: +7 47146
- OKTMO ID: 38624408101
- Website: visoksk.rkursk.ru

Vysokoye (Russian: Высокое) is a rural locality (Russian: село, lit. 'village') and the administrative center of Vysoksky Selsoviet Rural Settlement, Medvensky District, Kursk Oblast, Russia. Population: 457 (2010 census); 495 (2002 census);

== Geography ==
The village is located on the Reut River (a left tributary of the Seym), 59 km from the Russia–Ukraine border, 33.5 km south-west of Kursk, 7 km west of the district center – the urban-type settlement Medvenka.

Climate

Vysokoye has a warm-summer humid continental climate (Dfb in the Köppen climate classification).

== Transport ==
Vysokoye is located 8 km from the federal route M-2 Crimea Highway (a part of the European route E105), 15 km from the road of regional importance 38K-004 (Dyakonovo – Sudzha – border with Ukraine), 5 km from the road 38K-009 (M2 Crimea Highway – 38K-004), on the road of intermunicipal significance 38H-223 (M2 "Crimea Highway" – Leninskaya Iskra – Vysokoye), on the road 38H-204 (38K-009 – Vysokoye), 24 km from the nearest railway station Dyakonovo (railway line Lgov I — Kursk).

The rural locality is situated 41 km from Kursk Vostochny Airport, 96 km from Belgorod International Airport and 228 km from Voronezh Peter the Great Airport.
