= Polny =

Rural locality in Kursk Oblast, Russia

Polny Полный
- Khutor
- Interactive map of Polny
- Location of Polny Polny (Kursk Oblast)
- Coordinates: 51°33′10″N 36°26′53″E
- Country: Russia
- Federal subject: Kursk Oblast
- Administrative district: Medvensky District
- SelsovietSelsoviet: Kitayevsky

Population (2010 Census)
  - Total: 52
  - Estimate (2010): 52 (0%)

Municipal status
  - Municipal district: Medvensky Municipal District
  - Rural settlement: Kitayevsky Selsoviet Rural Settlement
- Time zone: UTC+3 (MSK)
- Postal code: 307051
- Dialing code: +7 47146
- OKTMO ID: 38624424141
- Website: kitayss.rkursk.ru

Polny (Russian: Полный) is a rural locality (a khutor) in Kitayevsky Selsoviet Rural Settlement, Medvensky District, Kursk Oblast, Russia. Population: 52 (2010 census); 63 (2002 census);

== Geography ==
The khutor is located on the Polnaya River (a left tributary of the Seym), 92 km (57 mi) from the Russia–Ukraine border, 25 km (16 mi) south-east of Kursk, 26 km (16 mi) north-east of the district center – the urban-type settlement Medvenka, 10 km (6.2 mi) from the selsoviet center – 2nd Kitayevka.

Climate

Polny has a warm-summer humid continental climate (Dfb in the Köppen climate classification).

== Transport ==
Polny is located 25 km (16 mi) from the federal route M-2 Crimea Highway (a part of the European route E105), 2 km (1.2 mi) from the road of intermunicipal significance 38H-236 (M2 "Crimea Highway" – Polevaya), on the road 38H-237 (M2 "Crimea Highway" – Polny – 38N-236), 7 km (4.3 mi) from the nearest railway station Polevaya (railway line Klyukva — Belgorod).

The rural locality is situated 25 km (16 mi) from Kursk Vostochny Airport, 100 km (62 mi) from Belgorod International Airport and 194 km (121 mi) from Voronezh Peter the Great Airport.
