= Medvenka, Kursk Oblast =

Medvenka Медвенка
- Urban-type settlement
- Interactive map of Medvenka
- Location of Medvenka Medvenka (Kursk Oblast)
- Coordinates: 51.4172°N 36.1194°E
- Country: Russia
- Federal subject: Kursk Oblast
- Administrative district: Medvensky District

Population (2010 Census)
  - Total: 4,398
  - Estimate (2025): 4,271 (−2.9%)
- Time zone: UTC+3 (MSK)
- Postal code: 307030
- OKTMO ID: 38624151051

Medvenka (Russian: Медвенка) is an urban locality (an urban-type settlement) in Medvensky District of Kursk Oblast, Russia. Population: 4,498 (2021 census); 4,398 (2010 census); 4,595 (2002 census); 4,446 (1989 Soviet census).

== Geography ==
The settlement is located on the Medvenka (a.k.a. Medvensky Kolodez) Brook (a left tributary of the Polnaya in the basin of the Seym), 65 km from the Russia–Ukraine border, 33 km south of Kursk.

Streets

There are the following streets in the locality: 1st Maya, Beryozovaya, Cheptsova, pereulok F. Engelsa, Gagarina, pereulok Gazovy, Ivana Kozheduba, K. Marksa, Kirova, Kolkhoznaya, Komsomolskaya, pereulok Kooperativny, pereulok Kutuzova, pereulok Lenina, Lenina, M. Gorkogo, Magistralnaya, Marata, Molodyozhnaya, pereulok Nakhimova, Parkovaya, Pevneva, Ploshchad Geroyev, Polevaya, 2nd Polevaya, Pochtovaya, Proletarskaya, Promyshlennaya, 2nd Promyshlennaya, pereulok Promyshlenny, Raduzhnaya, Sadovaya, pereulok Shkolny, Sovetskaya, Sovkhoznaya, Solnechnaya, pereulok Suvorova, Uspenskaya, pereulok Vatutina, Konstantina Vorobyova, Yuzhnaya, pereulok Zavodskoy and Zelyonaya (1464 houses).

Climate

Medvenka has a warm-summer humid continental climate (Dfb in the Köppen climate classification).

Climate data for Medvenka
Month	Jan	Feb	Mar	Apr	May	Jun	Jul	Aug	Sep	Oct	Nov	Dec	Year
Mean daily maximum °C (°F)	−4.1 (24.6)	−3 (27)	2.9 (37.2)	13 (55)	19.4 (66.9)	22.6 (72.7)	25.3 (77.5)	24.6 (76.3)	18.2 (64.8)	10.6 (51.1)	3.4 (38.1)	−1.2 (29.8)	11.0 (51.8)
Daily mean °C (°F)	−6.2 (20.8)	−5.6 (21.9)	−0.7 (30.7)	8.2 (46.8)	14.7 (58.5)	18.3 (64.9)	20.9 (69.6)	20 (68)	14 (57)	7.2 (45.0)	1.2 (34.2)	−3.1 (26.4)	7.4 (45.3)
Mean daily minimum °C (°F)	−8.7 (16.3)	−8.8 (16.2)	−4.8 (23.4)	2.7 (36.9)	9 (48)	13 (55)	15.8 (60.4)	14.9 (58.8)	9.7 (49.5)	3.9 (39.0)	−1.1 (30.0)	−5.3 (22.5)	3.4 (38.0)
Average precipitation mm (inches)	51 (2.0)	44 (1.7)	47 (1.9)	49 (1.9)	62 (2.4)	69 (2.7)	73 (2.9)	55 (2.2)	57 (2.2)	57 (2.2)	46 (1.8)	49 (1.9)	659 (25.8)
Source: https://en.climate-data.org/asia/russian-federation/kursk-oblast/medvenka-32760/

== Transport ==
Medvenka is located on the federal route M-2 Crimea Highway (a part of the European route E105), on the roads of intermunicipal significance: 38H-185 (M2 "Crimea Highway" – Gakhovo), 38H-223 (M2 "Crimea Highway" – Leninskaya Iskra – Vysokoye), 38H-236 (M2 "Crimea Highway" – Polevaya), 38H-237 (M2 "Crimea Highway" – Polny – 38N-236) and 38H-251 (M2 "Crimea Highway" – Sadovy), 26 km from the nearest railway halt 457 km (railway line Lgov I — Kursk).

The locality is situated 39.5 km from Kursk Vostochny Airport, 91 km from Belgorod International Airport and 220 km from Voronezh Peter the Great Airport.
