= Medvensky District =

Medvensky District Медвенский район (Russian)
- District
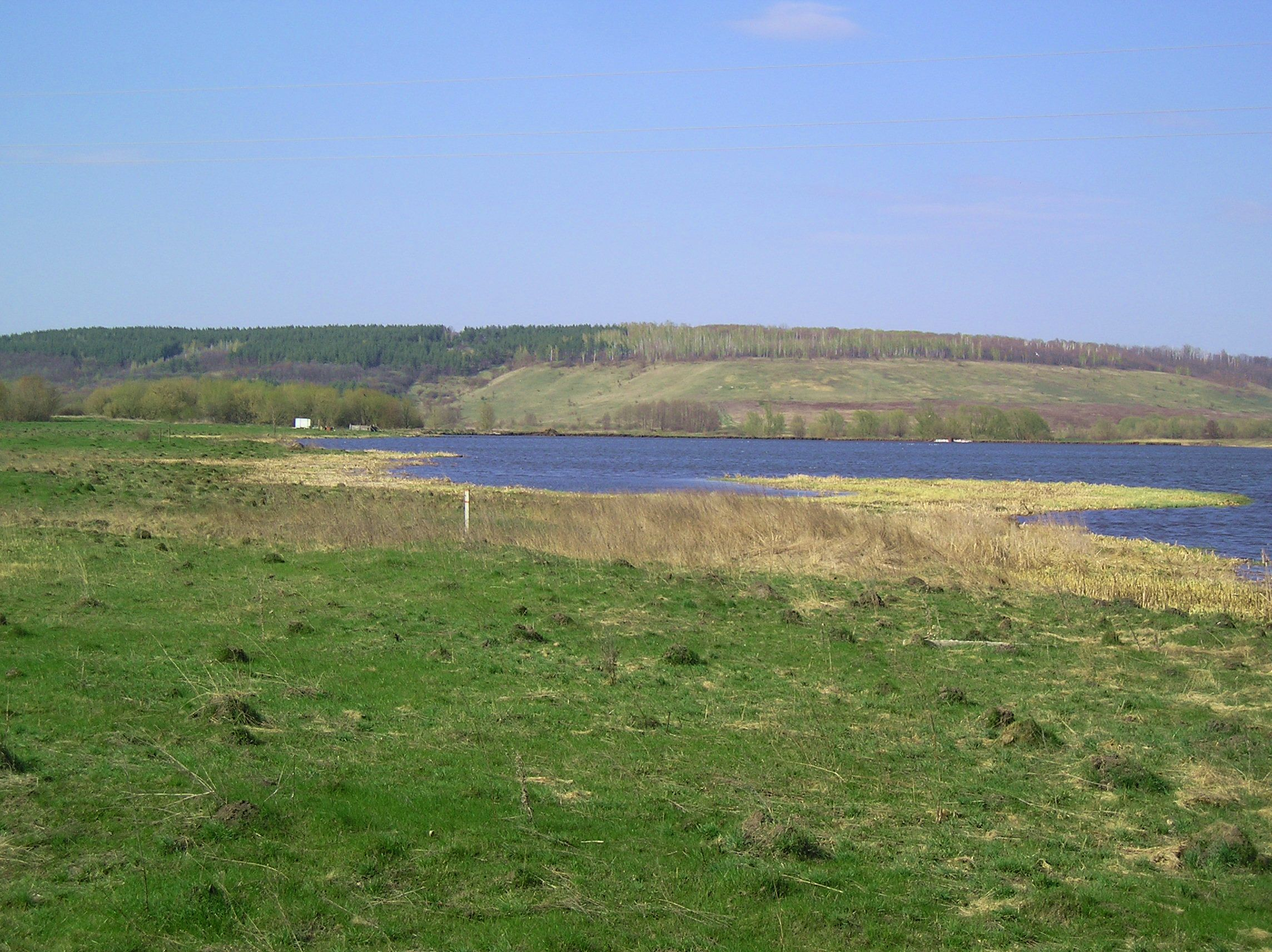
- Lake in Medvensky District

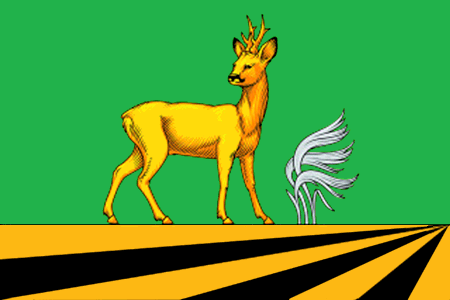
- Flag Coat of arms
- Location of Medvensky District in Kursk Oblast
- Coordinates: 51°24′59″N 36°06′46″E
- Country: Russia
- Federal subject: Kursk Oblast
- Established: 1970
- Administrative center: Medvenka

Area
  - Total: 1,090 km^{2} (420 sq mi)

Population (2010 Census)
  - Total: 16,558
  - Density: 15.2/km^{2} (39.3/sq mi)
  - Urban: 26.6%
  - Rural: 73.4%

Administrative structure
  - Administrative divisions: 1 Work settlements, 15 Selsoviets
  - Inhabited localities: 1 urban-type settlements, 146 rural localities

Municipal structure
  - Municipally incorporated as: Medvensky Municipal District
  - Municipal divisions: 1 urban settlements, 10 rural settlements
- Time zone: UTC+3 (MSK)
- OKTMO ID: 38624000
- Website: http://medvenka.rkursk.ru/

Medvensky District (Russian: Ме́двенский райо́н) is an administrative and municipal district (raion), one of the twenty-eight in Kursk Oblast, Russia. It is located in the southern central part of the oblast. The area of the district is 1,090 square kilometers (420 sq mi). Its administrative center is the urban locality (a work settlement) of Medvenka. Population: 16,324 (2021 census); 16,558 (2010 census); 19,220 (2002 Census); 21,528 (1989 Soviet census). The population of Medvenka accounts for 27.6% of the district's total population.

== Geography ==
Medvensky District is located in the south central region of Kursk Oblast. The terrain is hilly plain on the Central Russian Upland. There are no major rivers through the district. The district is 15 km south of the city of Kursk and 480 km southwest of Moscow. The area measures 25 km (north-south), and 50 km (west-east). The administrative center is the town of Medvenka. The district is bordered on the north by Kursky District, on the east by Solntsevsky District, on the south by Oboyansky District, and on the west by Bolshesoldatsky District.

== Administrative division of the district ==
The district is divided into 10 administrative units: the urban-type settlement Medvenka as a municipal urban settlement and 9 selsoviets:

Sielsoviet	The seat of the unit	Number of localities	Population (2010)	Area [km²]	Website
Amosovsky	Amosovka	17	1168	67.53	amos.rkursk.ru
Chermoshnyansky	Nizhny Dubovets	17	1440	164.72	chermoshnoe.rkursk.ru
Gostomlyansky	1st Gostomlya	17	1077	127.3	www.rusprofile.ru
Kitayevsky	2nd Kitayevka	25	1294	152	kitayss.rkursk.ru
Nizhnereutchansky	Nizhny Reutets	14	1190	105.95	nizhnezeut.rkursk.ru
Panikinsky	Paniki	3	1189	73	panikiss.rkursk.ru
Paninsky	1st Panino	9	1593	83.88	panino.rkursk.ru
Vyshnereutchansky	Verkhny Reutets	30	1751	173.24	vishereut.rkursk.ru
Vysoksky	Vysokoye	14	1458	124.35	visoksk.rkursk.ru

There are one urban-type settlement and 146 rural localities within the district, including 19 unpopulated ones:

Locality	Original name	Sielsoviet	Population (2002)	Coordinates
2nd Petropavlovskiye Vyselki	2-е Петропавловские Выселки	Amosovsky	2	51°32′23″N 36°13′03″E
Andrianovka	Андриановка	Vysoksky	16	51°31′21″N 35°55′26″E
Krasnovka	Красновка	Gostomlyansky	0	51°29′19″N 35°43′02″E
Mokry	Мокрый	Chermoshnyansky	0	51°28′09″N 36°12′28″E
Osinovy	Осиновый	Chermoshnyansky	0	51°27′44″N 36°13′56″E
Polyana	Поляна	Vyshnereutchansky	0	51°20′16″N 35°48′47″E
Ptina	Птина	Vyshnereutchansky	2	51°24′32″N 35°58′09″E
Raykhutor	Райхутор	Kitayevsky	0	51°28′22″N 36°19′23″E
Romanovka	Романовка	Kitayevsky	5	51°26′06″N 36°15′04″E
Rozhnovka	Рожновка	Vyshnereutchansky	0	51°20′57″N 35°55′05″E
Shirokoye	Широкое	Vyshnereutchansky	9	51°23′54″N 35°50′40″E
Spartak	Спартак	Amosovsky	1	51°33′53″N 36°14′40″E
Step	Степь	Gostomlyansky	14	51°30′28″N 35°55′21″E
Step (a selo)	Степь	Vyshnereutchansky	7	51°24′13″N 35°50′25″E
Step (a khutor)	Степь	Vyshnereutchansky	8	51°21′03″N 35°56′17″E
Step-Khmelevoye	Степь-Хмелевое	Vyshnereutchansky	3	51°20′24″N 35°55′27″E
Vorobzha	Воробжа	Vysoksky	26	51°30′34″N 35°56′05″E
Zamelenky	Замаленький	Vyshnereutchansky	0	51°24′09″N 35°56′59″E
Zayegoryevsky	Заегорьевский	Vyshnereutchansky	2	51°23′46″N 35°57′17″E

== Economy ==
In the Medvensky District, the leading economic sector is agriculture. As of 2017, there are 128 peasant farms and 11 agricultural enterprises that are engaged in agricultural production. This region is a major producer and distributor of grain crops, sugar beets, milk, and meat.
