= Polyana =

Polyana (Russian: Поля́на) may refer to:

== Russia ==
- Polyana, Amur Oblast, a selo
- Polyana, Astrakhan Oblast, a settlement
- Polyana, Republic of Bashkortostan, a settlement
- Polyana, Klintsovsky District, Bryansk Oblast, a settlement
- Polyana, Medvensky District, Kursk Oblast, a khutor
- Polyana, Vologda Oblast, a village

== Ukraine ==
- Polyana, a village in Turiatka, Chernivtsi Oblast
- a transliteration variant of Poliana, a village in Dniester Raion, Chernivtsi Oblast

== See also ==
- Polyana-D4
- Bolshaya Polyana, a list of Russian localities
- Krasnaya Polyana, a list of Russian localities
- Russkaya Polyana, a list of Russian localities
- Yasnaya Polyana (disambiguation)
