= Lipovac =

Lipovac is a Serbo-Croatian toponym and surname. It may refer to:

== Places ==
- Lipovac (Čelinac), a village in Republika Srpska, Bosnia and Herzegovina
- Lipovac (Srebrenica), a village in Republika Srpska, Bosnia and Herzegovina
- Lipovac, Vukovar-Syrmia County, a village near Nijemci, Croatia
- Lipovac, Virovitica-Podravina County, a village near Gradina, Croatia
- Lipovac, Karlovac County, a village near Rakovica, Croatia
- Lipovac (Aleksinac), a village in Serbia
- Lipovac (Gornji Milanovac), a village in Serbia
- Lipovac (Kruševac), a village in Serbia
- Lipovac (Ražanj), a village in Serbia
- Lipovac (Topola), a village in Serbia
- Lipovac (Vranje), a village in Serbia
- Srednji Lipovac, a village near Nova Kapela, Croatia

== See also ==
- Lipovec (disambiguation)
- Lypovets
- Lipovača (disambiguation)
- Lipovo (disambiguation)
- Lipovci, a village in Slovenia
- Gornji Lipovac (disambiguation), villages in Serbia and Croatia
- Donji Lipovac (disambiguation), villages in Serbia and Croatia
