= Krasnaya Polyana =

Krasnaya Polyana (Russian: Кра́сная Поля́на) meaning "Red Meadow" is the name of several inhabited localities in Russia:

== Modern localities ==
=== Amur Oblast ===
As of 2012, one rural locality in Amur Oblast bears this name:

- Krasnaya Polyana, Amur Oblast, a selo in Tomsky Rural Settlement of Seryshevsky District

=== Republic of Bashkortostan ===
As of 2012, one rural locality in the Republic of Bashkortostan bears this name:

- Krasnaya Polyana, Republic of Bashkortostan, a village in Mikyashevsky Selsoviet of Davlekanovsky District

=== Belgorod Oblast ===
As of 2012, three rural localities in Belgorod Oblast bear this name:

- Krasnaya Polyana, Chernyansky District, Belgorod Oblast, a settlement in Chernyansky District
- Krasnaya Polyana, Ivnyansky District, Belgorod Oblast, a khutor in Ivnyansky District
- Krasnaya Polyana, Shebekinsky District, Belgorod Oblast, a selo in Shebekinsky District

=== Bryansk Oblast ===
As of 2012, two rural localities in Bryansk Oblast bear this name:

- Krasnaya Polyana, Karachevsky District, Bryansk Oblast, a settlement under the administrative jurisdiction of Karachev Urban Administrative Okrug in Karachevsky District; 53°9′N 34°55′E
- Krasnaya Polyana, Surazhsky District, Bryansk Oblast, a settlement in Nivnyansky Rural Administrative Okrug of Surazhsky District; 53°9′N 32°31′E

=== Kabardino-Balkarian Republic ===
As of 2012, one rural locality in the Kabardino-Balkarian Republic bears this name:

- Krasnaya Polyana, Kabardino-Balkarian Republic, a selo in Maysky District; 43°39′N 44°0′E

=== Kemerovo Oblast ===
As of 2012, two rural localities in Kemerovo Oblast bear this name:

- Krasnaya Polyana, Leninsk-Kuznetsky District, Kemerovo Oblast, a settlement in Demyanovskaya Rural Territory of Leninsk-Kuznetsky District; 54°44′N 86°12′E
- Krasnaya Polyana, Prokopyevsky District, Kemerovo Oblast, a settlement in Safonovskaya Rural Territory of Prokopyevsky District; 53°55′N 86°28′E

=== Kirov Oblast ===
As of 2012, two inhabited localities in Kirov Oblast bear this name:

Urban localities

- Krasnaya Polyana, Vyatskopolyansky District, Kirov Oblast, an urban-type settlement in Vyatskopolyansky District; 56°15′N 51°10′E

Rural localities

- Krasnaya Polyana, Shabalinsky District, Kirov Oblast, a village in Gostovsky Rural Okrug of Shabalinsky District; 58°19′N 46°39′E

=== Kostroma Oblast ===
As of 2012, one rural locality in Kostroma Oblast bears this name:

- Krasnaya Polyana, Kostroma Oblast, a settlement in Klevantsovskoye Settlement of Ostrovsky District; 57°52′N 42°9′E

=== Krasnodar Krai ===
As of 2012, five inhabited localities in Krasnodar Krai bear this name:

Urban localities

- Krasnaya Polyana, Sochi, Krasnodar Krai, an urban-type settlement in Krasnopolyansky Settlement Okrug under the administrative jurisdiction of Adlersky City District under the administrative jurisdiction of the City of Sochi; 43°41′N 40°12′E

Rural localities

- Krasnaya Polyana, Armavir, Krasnodar Krai (also spelled "Krasnaya polyana"), a khutor in Prirechensky Rural Okrug under the administrative jurisdiction of the City of Armavir; 45°3′N 41°6′E
- Krasnaya Polyana, Bryukhovetsky District, Krasnodar Krai, a khutor in Bryukhovetsky Rural Okrug of Bryukhovetsky District; 45°47′N 39°2′E
- Krasnaya Polyana, Gulkevichsky District, Krasnodar Krai, a khutor in Ventsy-Zarya Rural Okrug of Gulkevichsky District; 45°21′N 40°52′E
- Krasnaya Polyana, Kushchyovsky District, Krasnodar Krai, a khutor in Bolshekozinsky Rural Okrug of Kushchyovsky District; 46°39′N 39°23′E

=== Krasnoyarsk Krai ===
As of 2012, one rural locality in Krasnoyarsk Krai bears this name:

- Krasnaya Polyana, Krasnoyarsk Krai, a selo in Krasnopolyansky Selsoviet of Nazarovsky District

=== Kursk Oblast ===
As of 2012, three rural localities in Kursk Oblast bear this name:

- Krasnaya Polyana, Cheremisinovsky District, Kursk Oblast, a selo in Cheremisinovsky District
- Krasnaya Polyana, Khomutovsky District, Kursk Oblast, a village in Olkhovsky Selsoviet of Khomutovsky District
- Krasnaya Polyana, Medvensky District, Kursk Oblast, a khutor in Petrovsky Selsoviet of Medvensky District
- Krasnaya Polyana, Oboyansky District, Kursk Oblast, a khutor in Bashkatovsky Selsoviet of Oboyansky District
- Krasnaya Polyana, Zolotukhinsky District, Kursk Oblast, a village in Zolotukhinsky District

=== Lipetsk Oblast ===
As of 2012, one rural locality in Lipetsk Oblast bears this name:

- Krasnaya Polyana, Lipetsk Oblast, a selo in Bolshepolyansky Selsoviet of Terbunsky District; 52°7′N 38°40′E

=== Mari El Republic ===
As of 2012, one rural locality in the Mari El Republic bears this name:

- Krasnaya Polyana, Mari El Republic, a village in Alexeyevsky Rural Okrug of Sovetsky District

=== Moskvasky Oblast ===
- Krasnaya Polyana, Moscow Oblast, now part of Lobnya, taken by Germany, briefly on November 30, 1941, in the Battle of Moscow (Bitya za Moskva).

=== Republic of Mordovia ===
As of 2012, five rural localities in the Republic of Mordovia bear this name:

- Krasnaya Polyana, Bolshebereznikovsky District, Republic of Mordovia, a settlement in Chernopromzinsky Selsoviet of Bolshebereznikovsky District
- Krasnaya Polyana, Insarsky District, Republic of Mordovia, a village in Mordovsko-Payevsky Selsoviet of Insarsky District
- Krasnaya Polyana, Kovylkinsky District, Republic of Mordovia, a settlement in Krasnoshadymsky Selsoviet of Kovylkinsky District
- Krasnaya Polyana, Staroshaygovsky District, Republic of Mordovia, a settlement in Staroshaygovsky Selsoviet of Staroshaygovsky District
- Krasnaya Polyana, Torbeyevsky District, Republic of Mordovia, a village in Khilkovsky Selsoviet of Torbeyevsky District

=== Nizhny Novgorod Oblast ===
As of 2012, two rural localities in Nizhny Novgorod Oblast bear this name:

- Krasnaya Polyana, Arzamassky District, Nizhny Novgorod Oblast, a village in Chernukhinsky Selsoviet of Arzamassky District
- Krasnaya Polyana, Lukoyanovsky District, Nizhny Novgorod Oblast, a selo in Bolshemaresyevsky Selsoviet of Lukoyanovsky District

=== Omsk Oblast ===
As of 2012, one rural locality in Omsk Oblast bears this name:

- Krasnaya Polyana, Omsk Oblast, a selo in Krasnopolyansky Rural Okrug of Gorkovsky District

=== Orenburg Oblast ===
As of 2012, three rural localities in Orenburg Oblast bear this name:

- Krasnaya Polyana, Matveyevsky District, Orenburg Oblast, a settlement in Matveyevsky Selsoviet of Matveyevsky District
- Krasnaya Polyana, Novosergiyevsky District, Orenburg Oblast, a settlement in Krasnopolyansky Selsoviet of Novosergiyevsky District
- Krasnaya Polyana, Orenburgsky District, Orenburg Oblast, a khutor in Sergiyevsky Selsoviet of Orenburgsky District

=== Oryol Oblast ===
As of 2012, six rural localities in Oryol Oblast bear this name:

- Krasnaya Polyana, Glazunovsky District, Oryol Oblast, a village in Medvedevsky Selsoviet of Glazunovsky District
- Krasnaya Polyana, Khotynetsky District, Oryol Oblast, a settlement in Abolmasovsky Selsoviet of Khotynetsky District
- Krasnaya Polyana, Kromskoy District, Oryol Oblast, a settlement in Apalkovsky Selsoviet of Kromskoy District
- Krasnaya Polyana, Livensky District, Oryol Oblast, a village in Nikolsky Selsoviet of Livensky District
- Krasnaya Polyana, Novoderevenkovsky District, Oryol Oblast, a village in Glebovsky Selsoviet of Novoderevenkovsky District
- Krasnaya Polyana, Novosilsky District, Oryol Oblast, a settlement in Golunsky Selsoviet of Novosilsky District

=== Penza Oblast ===
As of 2012, one rural locality in Penza Oblast bears this name:

- Krasnaya Polyana, Penza Oblast, a selo in Rakhmanovsky Selsoviet of Vadinsky District

=== Rostov Oblast ===
As of 2012, two rural localities in Rostov Oblast bear this name:

- Krasnaya Polyana, Azovsky District, Rostov Oblast, a khutor in Alexandrovskoye Rural Settlement of Azovsky District
- Krasnaya Polyana, Peschanokopsky District, Rostov Oblast, a selo in Krasnopolyanskoye Rural Settlement of Peschanokopsky District

=== Ryazan Oblast ===
As of 2012, two rural localities in Ryazan Oblast bear this name:

- Krasnaya Polyana, Kipchakovsky Rural Okrug, Korablinsky District, Ryazan Oblast, a village in Kipchakovsky Rural Okrug of Korablinsky District
- Krasnaya Polyana, Krasnensky Rural Okrug, Korablinsky District, Ryazan Oblast, a village in Krasnensky Rural Okrug of Korablinsky District

=== Samara Oblast ===
As of 2012, one rural locality in Samara Oblast bears this name:

- Krasnaya Polyana, Samara Oblast, a selo in Pestravsky District

=== Saratov Oblast ===
As of 2012, one rural locality in Saratov Oblast bears this name:

- Krasnaya Polyana, Saratov Oblast, a selo in Marksovsky District

=== Stavropol Krai ===
As of 2012, two rural localities in Stavropol Krai bear this name:

- Krasnaya Polyana, Ipatovsky District, Stavropol Krai, a selo in Lesnodachnensky Selsoviet of Ipatovsky District
- Krasnaya Polyana, Turkmensky District, Stavropol Krai, a settlement in Ovoshchinsky Selsoviet of Turkmensky District

=== Sverdlovsk Oblast ===
As of 2012, one rural locality in Sverdlovsk Oblast bears this name:

- Krasnaya Polyana, Sverdlovsk Oblast, a village in Krasnoufimsky District

=== Tambov Oblast ===
As of 2012, one rural locality in Tambov Oblast bears this name:

- Krasnaya Polyana, Tambov Oblast, a village in Bezukladovsky Selsoviet of Tokaryovsky District

=== Republic of Tatarstan ===
As of 2012, two rural localities in the Republic of Tatarstan bear this name:

- Krasnaya Polyana, Cheremshansky District, Republic of Tatarstan, a village in Cheremshansky District
- Krasnaya Polyana, Tetyushsky District, Republic of Tatarstan, a village in Tetyushsky District

=== Ulyanovsk Oblast ===
As of 2012, three rural localities in Ulyanovsk Oblast bear this name:

- Krasnaya Polyana, Baryshsky District, Ulyanovsk Oblast, a selo under the administrative jurisdiction of Leninsky Settlement Okrug in Baryshsky District
- Krasnaya Polyana, Pavlovsky District, Ulyanovsk Oblast, a village in Shakhovsky Rural Okrug of Pavlovsky District
- Krasnaya Polyana, Staromaynsky District, Ulyanovsk Oblast, a settlement in Krasnorechensky Rural Okrug of Staromaynsky District

=== Voronezh Oblast ===
As of 2012, one rural locality in Voronezh Oblast bears this name:

- Krasnaya Polyana, Voronezh Oblast, a khutor in Rossoshanskoye Rural Settlement of Repyovsky District

== Historical localities ==
- Krasnaya Polyana, Moscow Oblast, former village in Moscow Oblast and location of a major action during the Battle of Moscow; now a part of the town of Lobnya

== Alternative names ==
- Krasnaya Polyana, alternative name of Polyana, a settlement in Velikotopalsky Rural Administrative Okrug of Klintsovsky District in Bryansk Oblast; 52°33′N 32°17′E
