= Blizhny =

Blizhny (Russian: Ближний), rural localities in Russia, may refer to:

- Blizhny, Chelyabinsk Oblast, a settlement
- Blizhny, Kemerovo Oblast, a settlement
- Blizhny, Krasnodar Krai, a settlement
- Blizhny, Kursk Oblast, a khutor
- Blizhny, Orenburg Oblast, a settlement
- Blizhny, Alexandrov-Gaysky District, Saratov Oblast, a khutor
- Blizhny, Novouzensky District, Saratov Oblast, a khutor
- Blizhny, Volgograd Oblast, a khutor

== See also ==
- Blizhny Sakhalin
