= Lipovo, Russia =

Lipovo (Russian: Ли́пово) is the name of several rural localities in Russia:

- Lipovo, Cheboksarsky District, Chuvash Republic, a village in Atlashevskoye Rural Settlement of Cheboksarsky District of the Chuvash Republic
- Lipovo, Kozlovsky District, Chuvash Republic, a village in Yemetkinskoye Rural Settlement of Kozlovsky District of the Chuvash Republic
- Lipovo, Kaliningrad Oblast, a settlement under the administrative jurisdiction of Gusev Town of District Significance, Gusevsky District, Kaliningrad Oblast
- Lipovo, Oktyabrsky District, Kostroma Oblast, a village in Novinskoye Settlement of Oktyabrsky District of Kostroma Oblast
- Lipovo, Pavinsky District, Kostroma Oblast, a village in Pavinskoye Settlement of Pavinsky District of Kostroma Oblast
- Lipovo, Leningrad Oblast, a village in Ust-Luzhskoye Settlement Municipal Formation of Kingiseppsky District of Leningrad Oblast
- Lipovo, Dobryanka, Perm Krai, a village under the administrative jurisdiction of the town of krai significance of Dobryanka, Perm Krai
- Lipovo, Kungursky District, Perm Krai, a village in Kungursky District, Perm Krai
- Lipovo, Smolensk Oblast, a village in Gusinskoye Rural Settlement of Krasninsky District of Smolensk Oblast
- Lipovo, Tula Oblast, a selo in Lipovskaya Rural Administration of Shchyokinsky District of Tula Oblast
- Lipovo, Kirillovsky District, Vologda Oblast, a village in Lipovsky Selsoviet of Kirillovsky District of Vologda Oblast
- Lipovo, Nikolsky District, Vologda Oblast, a village in Permassky Selsoviet of Nikolsky District of Vologda Oblast
