= Belousovka =

Belousovka Белоусовка
- Selo
- Location within Amur Oblast Location within Russia
- Coordinates: 50°59′N 128°06′E
- Country: Russia
- Region: Amur Oblast
- District: Seryshevsky District
- Time zone: UTC+9:00

Belousovka (Russian: Белоусовка) is a rural locality (a selo) in Lebyazhyevsky Selsoviet of Seryshevsky District, Amur Oblast, Russia. The population was 41 as of 2018. There are three streets.

== Geography ==
Belousovka is located on the Tom River, 28 km southwest of Seryshevo (the district's administrative centre) by road. Lebyazhye is the nearest rural locality.
