= Klyuchiki, Amur Oblast =

Klyuchiki Ключики
- Selo
- Location within Amur Oblast Location within Russia
- Coordinates: 50°56′N 128°10′E
- Country: Russia
- Region: Amur Oblast
- District: Seryshevsky District
- Time zone: UTC+9:00

Klyuchiki (Russian: Ключики) is a rural locality (a selo) in Bolshesazansky Selsoviet of Seryshevsky District, Amur Oblast, Russia. The population was 166, as of 2018. There are four streets.

== Geography ==
Klyuchiki is located on the Zeya River, 28 km north of Seryshevo (the district's administrative centre) by road. Ozornoye is the nearest rural locality.
