= Sasek =

Sasek may refer to:

== People ==
- Amanda Sasek (born 1991), American beauty pageant titleholder

== Places ==
- Sasek Mały
- Sasek Wielki
