= Udarnoye, Amur Oblast =

Udarnoye Ударное
- Selo
- Location within Amur Oblast Location within Russia
- Coordinates: 51°05′N 128°19′E
- Country: Russia
- Region: Amur Oblast
- District: Seryshevsky District
- Time zone: UTC+9:00

Udarnoye (Russian: Ударное) is a rural locality (a selo) in Polyansky Selsoviet of Seryshevsky District, Amur Oblast, Russia. The population was 370 as of 2018. There are 7 streets.

== Geography ==
Udarnoye is located 7 km west of Seryshevo (the district's administrative centre) by road. Seryshevo is the nearest rural locality.
