= Bolshaya =

Bolshaya (Russian language for "big") may refer to:

- Bolshaya, Arkhangelsk, a village
- Bolshaya chistka, "Great Purge", the 1936–1938 Soviet purge
- Bolshaya Izhora, an urban locality in the Lomonosovsky District of Leningrad Oblast
- Bolshaya Muksalma, one of the Solovetsky Islands
- Bolshaya Polyana, the name of several locations in Russia
- Bolshaya Pyora River (Amur Oblast), a river in the Amur Oblast
- Bolshaya (river) a river on the Kamchatka Peninsula
- Bolshaya Udina, a volcanic massif in the Kamchatka Peninsula
- Bolshaya Gora, former Russian name of Denali (Mount McKinley)
