= Klyuchiki =

Klyuchiki (Russian: Палева) is the name of several rural localities in Russia:

- Klyuchiki, Amur Oblast, a selo in Seryshevsky District, Amur Oblast
- Klyuchiki (Kultayevskoye Rural Settlement), Permsky District, Perm Krai, a village in Permsky District, Perm Krai
