= Vodorazdelnoye =

Vodorazdelnoye Водораздельное
- Selo
- Location within Amur Oblast Location within Russia
- Coordinates: 51°04′N 128°55′E
- Country: Russia
- Region: Amur Oblast
- District: Seryshevsky District
- Time zone: UTC+9:00

Vodorazdelnoye (Russian: Водораздельное) is a rural locality (a selo) and the administrative center of Vodorazdelnensky Selsoviet of Seryshevsky District, Amur Oblast, Russia. The population was 230 as of 2018. There are 6 streets.

== Geography ==
Vodorazdelnoye is located 51 km east of Seryshevo (the district's administrative centre) by road. Milekhino is the nearest rural locality.
