= Birma, Amur Oblast =

Birma Бирма
- Selo
- Location within Amur Oblast Location within Russia
- Coordinates: 51°25′N 128°42′E
- Country: Russia
- Region: Amur Oblast
- District: Seryshevsky District
- Time zone: UTC+9:00

Birma (Russian: Бирма) is a rural locality (a selo) in Lermontovsky Selsoviet of Seryshevsky District, Amur Oblast, Russia. The population was 45 as of 2018. There are 2 streets.

== Geography ==
Birma is located on the Birma River, 54 km northeast of Seryshevo (the district's administrative centre) by road. Alexeyevka is the nearest rural locality.
