= Lipovka, Seryshevsky District, Amur Oblast =

Lipovka Липовка
- Selo
- Location within Amur Oblast Location within Russia
- Coordinates: 51°03′N 128°13′E
- Country: Russia
- Region: Amur Oblast
- District: Seryshevsky District
- Time zone: UTC+9:00

Lipovka (Russian: Липовка) is a rural locality (a selo) in Kazansky Selsoviet of Seryshevsky District, Amur Oblast, Russia. The population was 71 as of 2018. There is 1 street.

== Geography ==
Lipovka is located 14 km southwest of Seryshevo (the district's administrative centre) by road. Seryshevo is the nearest rural locality.
