= Derzhavinka =

Derzhavinka Державинка
- Selo
- Location within Amur Oblast Location within Russia
- Coordinates: 51°09′N 128°51′E
- Country: Russia
- Region: Amur Oblast
- District: Seryshevsky District
- Time zone: UTC+9:00

Derzhavinka (Russian: Державинка) is a rural locality (a selo) in Sosnovsky Selsoviet of Seryshevsky District, Amur Oblast, Russia. The population was 118 as of 2018. There are 3 streets.

== Geography ==
Derzhavinka is located 39 km east of Seryshevo (the district's administrative centre) by road. Sosnovka is the nearest rural locality.
