= Sretenka, Amur Oblast =

Sretenka Сретенка
- Selo
- Location within Amur Oblast Location within Russia
- Coordinates: 51°04′N 127°53′E
- Country: Russia
- Region: Amur Oblast
- District: Seryshevsky District
- Time zone: UTC+9:00

Sretenka (Russian: Сретенка) is a rural locality (a selo) in Kazansky Selsoviet of Seryshevsky District, Amur Oblast, Russia. The population was 40 as of 2018. There is 1 street.

== Geography ==
Sretenka is located 42 km west of Seryshevo (the district's administrative centre) by road. Kazanka is the nearest rural locality.
