= Khitrovka, Amur Oblast =

Khitrovka Хитровка
- Selo
- Location within Amur Oblast Location within Russia
- Coordinates: 50°56′N 128°33′E
- Country: Russia
- Region: Amur Oblast
- District: Seryshevsky District
- Time zone: UTC+9:00

Khitrovka (Russian: Хитровка) is a rural locality (a selo) in Tomsky Selsoviet of Seryshevsky District, Amur Oblast, Russia. The population was 115 as of 2018. There are 3 streets.

== Geography ==
Khitrovka is located on the Tom River, 25 km southeast of Seryshevo (the district's administrative centre) by road. Belogorka is the nearest rural locality.
