= Lipowiec =

Lipowiec may refer to:

- Lipowiec, Kuyavian-Pomeranian Voivodeship (north-central Poland)
- Lipowiec, Biłgoraj County in Lublin Voivodeship (east Poland)
- Lipowiec, Lower Silesian Voivodeship (south-west Poland)
- Lipowiec, Gmina Tyszowce, Tomaszów County in Lublin Voivodeship (east Poland)
- Lipowiec, Masovian Voivodeship (east-central Poland)
- Lipówiec, Masovian Voivodeship (east-central Poland)
- Lipowiec, Greater Poland Voivodeship (west-central Poland)
- Lipowiec, Silesian Voivodeship (south Poland)
- Lipowiec, Kartuzy County in Pomeranian Voivodeship (north Poland)
- Lipowiec, Subcarpathian Voivodeship (south-east Poland)
- Lipowiec, Nowe Miasto County in Warmian-Masurian Voivodeship (north Poland)
- Lipowiec, Ostróda County in Warmian-Masurian Voivodeship (north Poland)
- Lipowiec, Szczytno County in Warmian-Masurian Voivodeship (north Poland)
- Gmina Lipowiec Kościelny
- Lipowiec Kościelny
- Lipowiec Mały
- Lipowiec-Kolonia
- Nowy Lipowiec
- Stary Lipowiec
- Lipowiec, Ustroń

== See also ==
- Majdan Lipowiecki, a village
- Lipovec (disambiguation)
- Lipowice
