= Polyana, Amur Oblast =

Polyana Поляна
- Selo
- Location within Amur Oblast Location within Russia
- Coordinates: 51°03′N 128°24′E
- Country: Russia
- Region: Amur Oblast
- District: Seryshevsky District
- Time zone: UTC+9:00

Polyana (Russian: Поляна) is a rural locality (a selo) and the administrative center of Polyansky Selsoviet of Seryshevsky District, Amur Oblast, Russia. The population was 836 as of 2018.

== Geography ==
Polyana is located 4 km southeast of Seryshevo (the district's administrative centre) by road. Seryshevo is the nearest rural locality.
