= Lipovec =

Lipovec may refer to places:

== Croatia ==
- Lipovec, Krapina-Zagorje County, a village near Zlatar-Bistrica

== Czech Republic ==
- Lipovec (Blansko District), a municipality and village in the South Moravian Region
- Lipovec (Chrudim District), a municipality and village in the Pardubice Region

== Slovakia ==
- Lipovec, Martin District, a village in the Žilina Region
- Lipovec, Rimavská Sobota District, a village in the Banská Bystrica Region

== Slovenia ==
- Lipovec, Ribnica, a village
- Lipovec, Semič, a settlement
- Lipovec, Šmarje pri Jelšah, a settlement
- Lipovec pri Kostelu, a village
- Lipovec pri Škofji Vasi, a village

== See also ==
- Lypovets, a village in Ukraine
- Lipovets, Kursk Oblast in Russia
- Lipovac (disambiguation)
- Lipowiec (disambiguation)
