= Tomsky (inhabited locality) =

Tomsky (Russian: Томский; masculine), Tomskaya (Томская; feminine), or Tomskoye (Томское; neuter) is the name of several rural localities in Russia:

- Tomsky (rural locality), a settlement in Taborinsky District of Sverdlovsk Oblast
- Tomskoye, Amur Oblast, a selo in Tomsky Rural Settlement of Seryshevsky District of Amur Oblast
- Tomskoye, Kemerovo Oblast, a selo in Safonovskaya Rural Territory of Prokopyevsky District of Kemerovo Oblast
- Tomskoye, Khabarovsk Krai, a selo in Khabarovsky District of Khabarovsk Krai
- Tomskoye, Tomsk Oblast, a selo in Tomsky District of Tomsk Oblast
- Tomskaya, Omutinsky District, Tyumen Oblast, a village in Bolshekrasnoyarsky Rural Okrug of Omutinsky District of Tyumen Oblast
- Tomskaya, Vagaysky District, Tyumen Oblast, a village in Ptitsky Rural Okrug of Vagaysky District of Tyumen Oblast
