= Tomsky =

Tomsky (masculine), Tomskaya (feminine), or Tomskoye (neuter) may refer to:

- Mikhail Tomsky (1880–1936), Russian Bolshevik leader
- Nikolai Tomsky (1900–1984), Russian sculptor
- Tomsky District, a district of Tomsk Oblast, Russia
- Tomsky (inhabited locality) (Tomskaya, Tomskoye), several rural localities in Russia
- Tomsk Oblast (Tomskaya oblast), a federal subject of Russia
