= Dobryanka, Amur Oblast =

Dobryanka Добрянка
- Selo
- Location within Amur Oblast Location within Russia
- Coordinates: 51°12′N 128°23′E
- Country: Russia
- Region: Amur Oblast
- District: Seryshevsky District
- Time zone: UTC+9:00

Dobryanka (Russian: Добрянка) is a rural locality (a selo) in Ozyornensky Selsoviet of Seryshevsky District, Amur Oblast, Russia. The population was 181 as of 2018. There are 4 streets.

== Geography ==
Dobryanka is located 20 km north of Seryshevo (the district's administrative centre) by road. Belonogovo is the nearest rural locality.
