= Ozyornoye, Amur Oblast =

Ozyornoye, Amur Oblast Озёрное
- Selo
- Location within Amur Oblast Location within Russia
- Coordinates: 51°14′N 128°16′E
- Country: Russia
- Region: Amur Oblast
- District: Seryshevsky District
- Time zone: UTC+9:00

Ozyornoye (Russian: Озёрное) is a rural locality (a selo) and the administrative center of the Ozyornensky Selsoviet of Seryshevsky District, Amur Oblast, Russia. The population was 560 as of 2018. There are 11 streets in the locality.

== Geography ==
Ozyornoye is located 23 km north of Seryshevo (the district's administrative centre) by road. Arga is the nearest rural locality.
