= Dobryanka =

Dobryanka (Russian: Добрянка) is the name of several inhabited localities in Russia.

Urban localities

- Dobryanka, Perm Krai, a town in Perm Krai

Rural localities

- Dobryanka, Amur Oblast, a selo in Ozernensky Rural Settlement of Seryshevsky District in Amur Oblast
- Dobryanka, Omsk Oblast, a village in Volnovsky Rural Okrug of Poltavsky District in Omsk Oblast
- Dobryanka, Ryazan Oblast, a village in Lakashinsky Rural Okrug of Spassky District in Ryazan Oblast
