= Tomskoye, Amur Oblast =

Tomskoye Томское
- Selo
- Location within Amur Oblast Location within Russia
- Coordinates: 50°57′N 128°26′E
- Country: Russia
- Region: Amur Oblast
- District: Seryshevsky District
- Time zone: UTC+9:00

Tomskoye (Russian: Томское) is a rural locality (a selo) and the administrative center of Tomsky Selsoviet of Seryshevsky District, Amur Oblast, Russia. The population was 2,014 as of 2018. There are 14 streets.

== Geography ==
Tomskoye is located on the Tom River, 21 km south of Seryshevo (the district's administrative centre) by road. Bochkaryovka is the nearest rural locality.
