= Blizhny Sakhalin =

Blizhny Sakhalin Ближний Сахалин
- Selo
- Location within Amur Oblast Location within Russia
- Coordinates: 51°18′N 128°30′E
- Country: Russia
- Region: Amur Oblast
- District: Seryshevsky District
- Time zone: UTC+9:00

Blizhny Sakhalin (Russian: Ближний Сахалин) is a rural locality (a selo) in Lermontovsky Selsoviet of Seryshevsky District, Amur Oblast, Russia. The population was 35 as of 2018. There are 2 streets.

== Geography ==
Blizhny Sakhalin is located 34 km north of Seryshevo (the district's administrative centre) by road. Lermontovo is the nearest rural locality.
