= Krasnaya Polyana, Amur Oblast =

Krasnaya Polyana Красная Поляна
- Selo
- Location within Amur Oblast Location within Russia
- Coordinates: 50°59′N 128°26′E
- Country: Russia
- Region: Amur Oblast
- District: Seryshevsky District
- Time zone: UTC+9:00

Krasnaya Polyana (Russian: Красная Поляна) is a rural locality (a selo) in Tomsky Selsoviet of Seryshevsky District, Amur Oblast, Russia. The population was 154 as of 2018. There are 6 streets.

== Geography ==
Krasnaya Polyana is located 18 km south of Seryshevo (the district's administrative centre) by road. Ukraina is the nearest rural locality.
