= Olszyny, Warmian-Masurian Voivodeship =

Olszyny
- Village
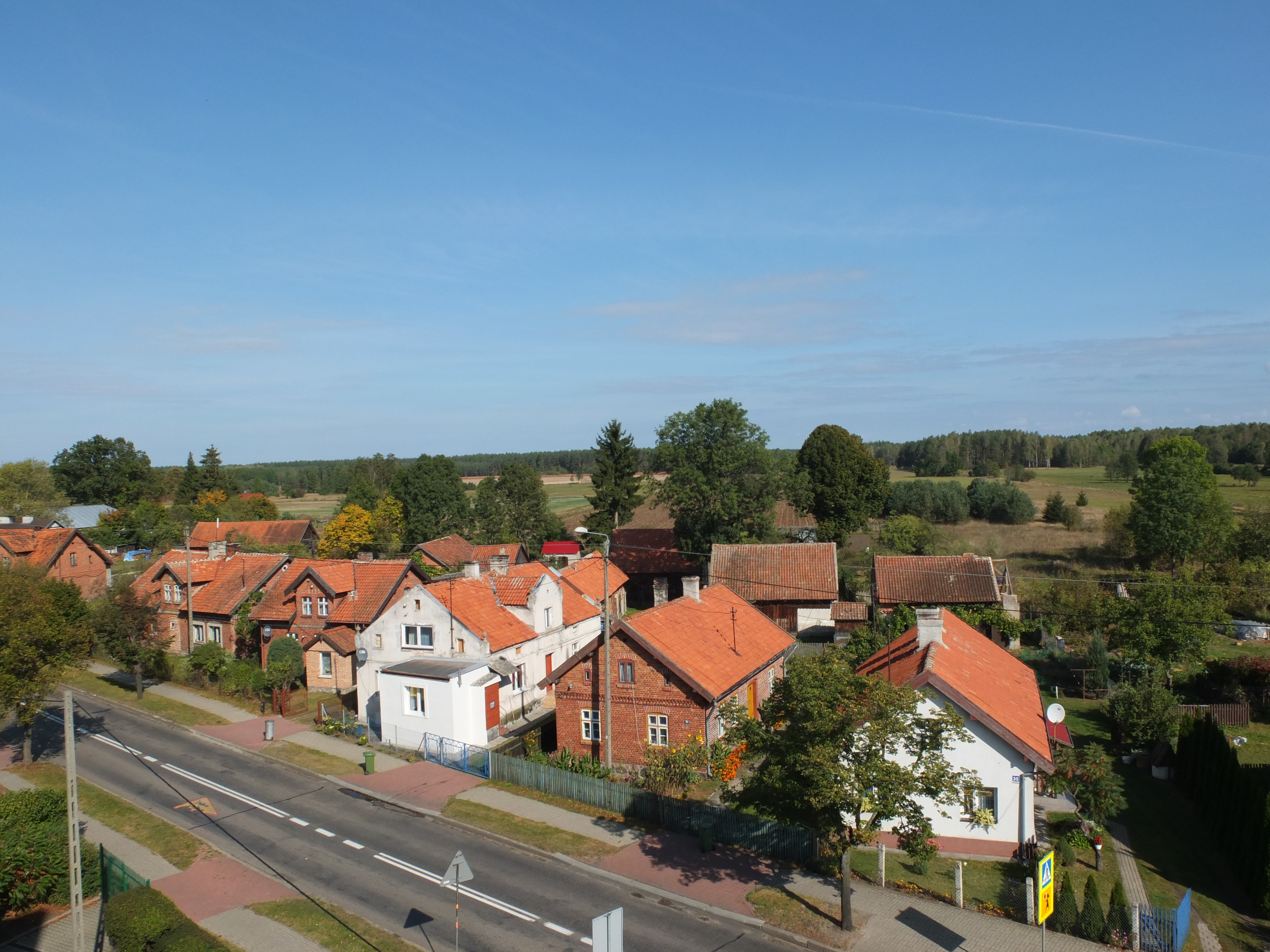

- Location within Poland
- Coordinates: 53°34′N 21°7′E
- Country: Poland
- Voivodeship: Warmian-Masurian
- County: Szczytno
- Gmina: Szczytno

Olszyny [ɔlˈʂɨnɨ] (German: Olschienen; 1938-45: Ebendorf) is a village in the administrative district of Gmina Szczytno, within Szczytno County, Warmian-Masurian Voivodeship, in northern Poland.
