= Yasnaya Polyana (disambiguation) =

Yasnaya Polyana may refer to:

- Yasnaya Polyana, the former estate of the writer Leo Tolstoy
- Yasnaya Polyana, Tula Oblast, a village in Tula Oblast, Russia, where Tolstoy's former estate is located
- Yasnaya Polyana, Altai Krai, a village in Altai Krai, Russia
- Yasnaya Polyana, Republic of Dagestan, a village in the Republic of Dagestan, Russia
- Yasnaya Polyana, Kaliningrad Oblast, a settlement in Kaliningrad Oblast, Russia
- Yasnaya Polyana, Kemerovo Oblast, a settlement in Kemerovo Oblast, Russia
- Yasnaya Polyana, Kurgan Oblast, a village in Kurgan Oblast, Russia
- Yasnaya Polyana, Orenburg Oblast, a settlement in Orenburg Oblast, Russia
- Yasnaya Polyana, Oryol Oblast, a settlement in Oryol Oblast, Russia
- Yasnaya Polyana, Anuchinsky District, Primorsky Krai, a village (selo) in Anuchinsky District of Primorsky Krai, Russia
- Yasnaya Polyana, Dalnerechensky District, Primorsky Krai, a village (selo) in Dalnerechensky District of Primorsky Krai, Russia
- Yasnaya Polyana, Stavropol Krai, a settlement in Stavropol Krai, Russia
- Yasnaya Polyana, Yaroslavl Oblast, a village in Yaroslavl Oblast, Russia
- Yasnaya Polyana, name of several other rural localities in Russia

== See also ==
- Yasnye Polyany, a settlement in Chelyabinsk Oblast, Russia
- Yasna polyana, a village in Burgas Province, Bulgaria named after Leo Tolstoy's birthplace
- Jasna Polana, an estate turned golf course, near Princeton, NJ (the name is originally Polish with the same meaning as in Russian)
- Yasnaia Poliana, pseudonym of Spanish writer Consuelo Berges (1899–1988)
