= Czarkowy Grąd =

- Village
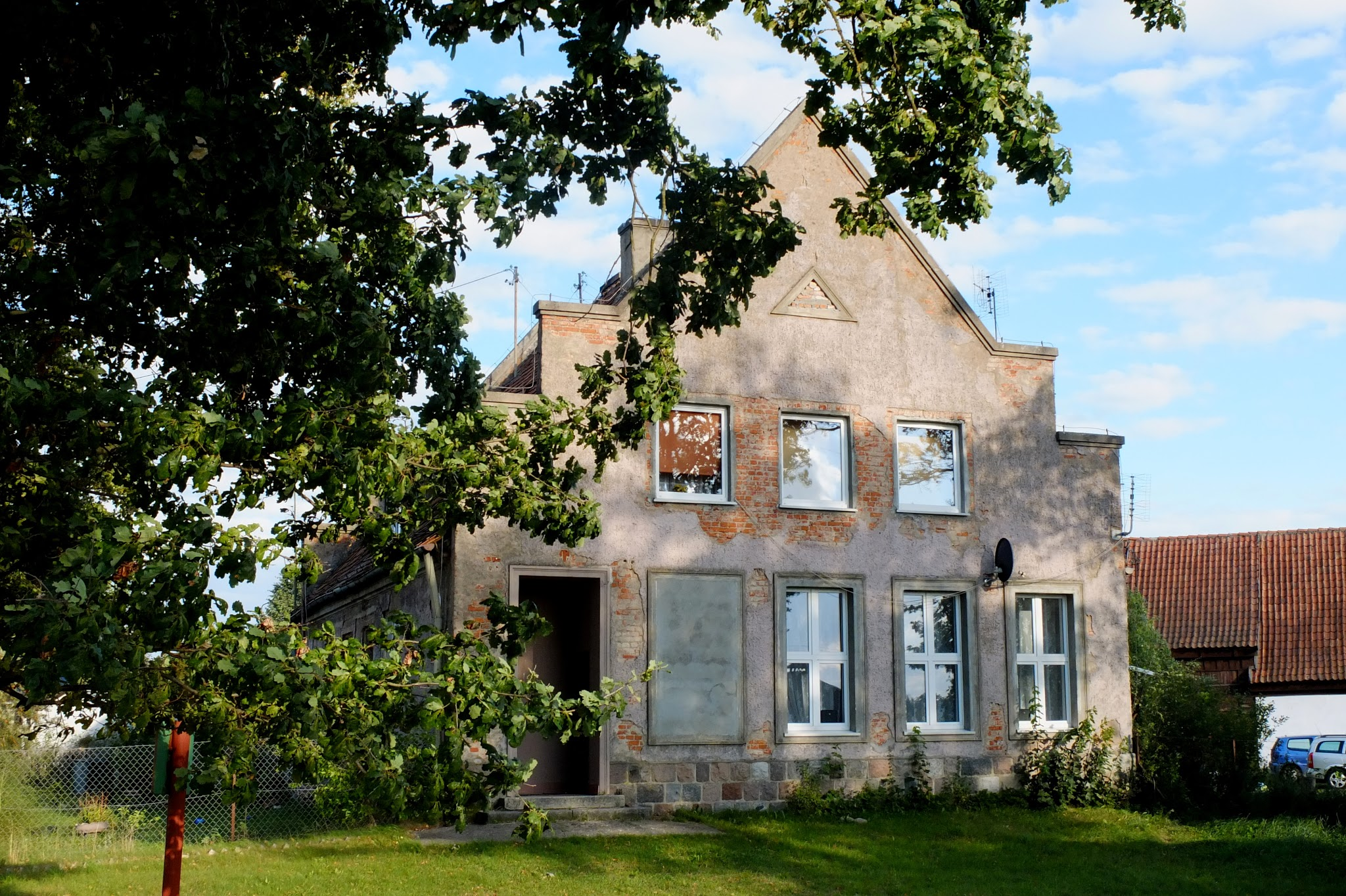

- Location within Poland
- Coordinates: 53°31′N 21°4′E
- Country: Poland
- Voivodeship: Warmian-Masurian
- County: Szczytno
- Gmina: Szczytno

Czarkowy Grąd [t͡ʂarˈkɔvɨ ˈɡrɔnt] (German: Worfengrund) is a village in the administrative district of Gmina Szczytno, within Szczytno County, Warmian-Masurian Voivodeship, in northern Poland.
