= Lipowa Góra Zachodnia =

- Village
- Location within Poland
- Coordinates: 53°35′07″N 20°58′51″E
- Country: Poland
- Voivodeship: Warmian-Masurian
- County: Szczytno
- Gmina: Szczytno

Lipowa Góra Zachodnia [liˈpɔva ˈɡura zaˈxɔdɲa] (German: Lindenberg) is a village in the administrative district of Gmina Szczytno, within Szczytno County, Warmian-Masurian Voivodeship, in northern Poland.
