= Gmina Szczytno =

Gmina Szczytno Szczytno Commune
- Gmina
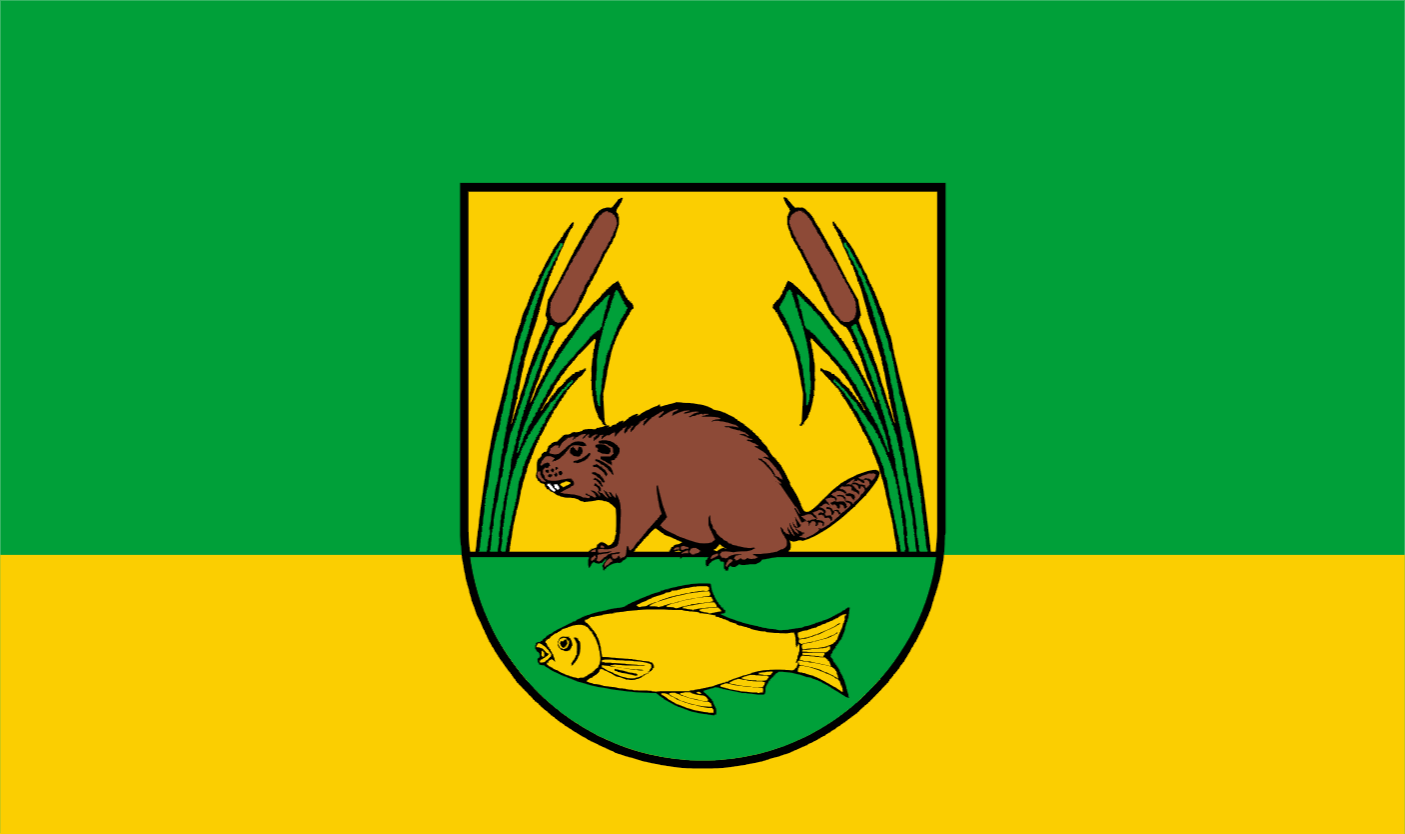
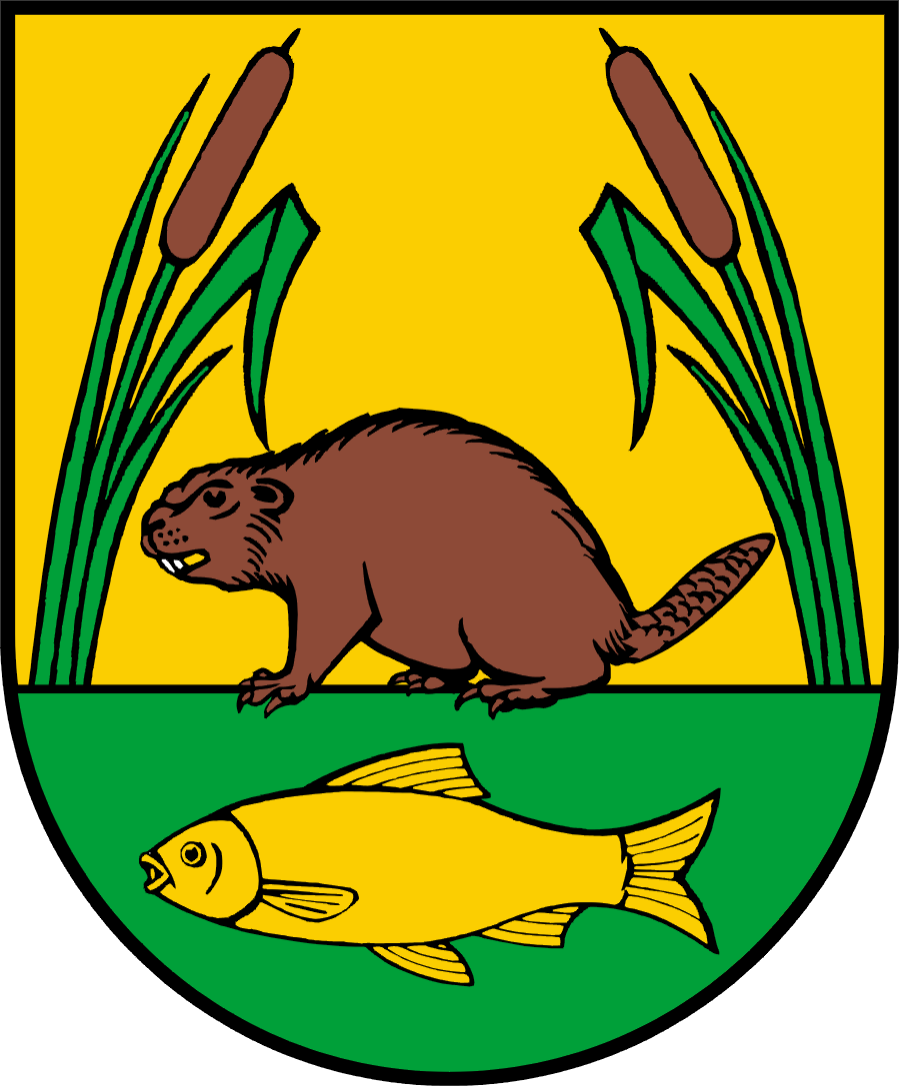
- Flag Coat of arms
- Interactive map of Gmina Szczytno
- Coordinates (Szczytno): 53°33′46″N 20°59′7″E
- Country: Poland
- Voivodeship: Warmian-Masurian
- County: Szczytno
- Seat: Szczytno

Area
  - Total: 347.26 km^{2} (134.08 sq mi)

Population (2006)
  - Total: 10,454
  - Density: 30.104/km^{2} (77.970/sq mi)
- Website: http://www.ug.szczytno.pl

Gmina Szczytno is a rural gmina (administrative district) in Szczytno County, Warmian-Masurian Voivodeship, in northern Poland. Its seat is the town of Szczytno, although the town is not part of the territory of the gmina.

The gmina covers an area of 347.26 square kilometres (134.1 sq mi), and as of 2006 its total population is 10,454.

== Villages ==
Gmina Szczytno contains the villages and settlements of Czarkowy Grąd, Dębówko, Gawrzyjałki, Jęcznik, Kamionek, Kaspry, Kobyłocha, Korpele, Lemany, Leśny Dwór, Lipowa Góra Wschodnia, Lipowa Góra Zachodnia, Lipowiec, Lipowiec Mały, Małdaniec, Marksewo, Niedźwiedzie, Nowe Dłutówko, Nowe Gizewo, Nowiny, Ochódno, Olszyny, Piece, Piecuchy, Płozy, Prusowy Borek, Puzary, Romany, Rudka, Sasek Mały, Sasek Wielki, Sędańsk, Siódmak, Stare Kiejkuty, Szczycionek, Szymany, Trelkówko, Trelkowo, Ulążki, Wałpusz, Wały, Wawrochy, Wólka Szczycieńska and Zielonka.

== Neighbouring gminas ==
Gmina Szczytno is bordered by the town of Szczytno and by the gminas of Dźwierzuty, Jedwabno, Pasym, Rozogi, Świętajno and Wielbark.
