= Siódmak, Szczytno County =

Siódmak
- Village
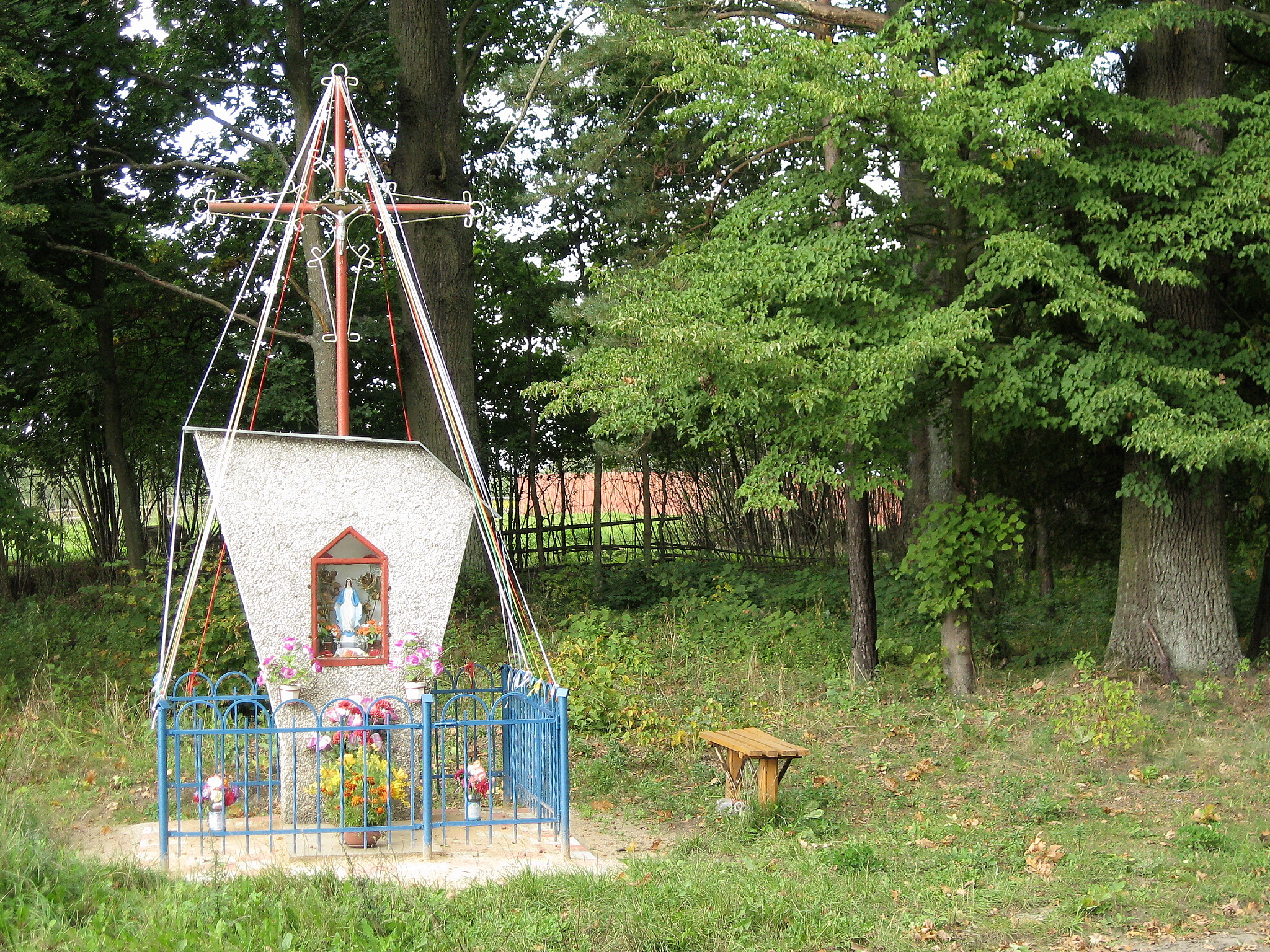

- Location within Poland
- Coordinates: 53°32′N 20°58′E
- Country: Poland
- Voivodeship: Warmian-Masurian
- County: Szczytno
- Gmina: Szczytno

Siódmak [ˈɕudmak] (German: Schodmack) is a village in the administrative district of Gmina Szczytno, within Szczytno County, Warmian-Masurian Voivodeship, in northern Poland.
