= Ulążki =

- Village
- Location within Poland
- Coordinates: 53°36′34″N 20°55′16″E
- Country: Poland
- Voivodeship: Warmian-Masurian
- County: Szczytno
- Gmina: Szczytno

Ulążki [uˈlɔ̃ʂki] (German: Ulonsk; 1938-45: Kleinrehbruch) is a village in the administrative district of Gmina Szczytno, within Szczytno County, Warmian-Masurian Voivodeship, in northern Poland.
