= Małdaniec =

- Village
- Location within Poland
- Coordinates: 53°29′N 21°3′E
- Country: Poland
- Voivodeship: Warmian-Masurian
- County: Szczytno
- Gmina: Szczytno
- Time zone: UTC+1 (CET)
  - Summer (DST): UTC+2 (CEST)
- Vehicle registration: NSZ
- Primary airport: Olsztyn-Mazury Airport

Małdaniec [mau̯ˈdaɲɛt͡s] (German: Maldanietz; 1938-45: Maldanen) is a village in the administrative district of Gmina Szczytno, within Szczytno County, Warmian-Masurian Voivodeship, in northern Poland. It is located in the historic region of Masuria.

== History ==
In the past, the territory was at various times part of Poland, Prussia and Germany. In 1938, the Nazi government of Germany renamed the village to Maldanen to erase traces of Polish origin. In 1945, following Germany's defeat in World War II, the region became again part of Poland and the historic name of the village was restored.
