= Szczycionek =

- Village
- Location within Poland
- Coordinates: 53°35′01″N 20°56′48″E
- Country: Poland
- Voivodeship: Warmian-Masurian
- County: Szczytno
- Gmina: Szczytno
- Population (approx.): 250

Szczycionek [ʂt͡ʂɨˈt͡ɕɔnɛk] (German: Waldsee) is a village in the administrative district of Gmina Szczytno, within Szczytno County, Warmian-Masurian Voivodeship, in northern Poland.

The village has an approximate population of 250.
