= Kaspry =

- Village
- Location within Poland
- Coordinates: 53°38′N 21°2′E
- Country: Poland
- Voivodeship: Warmian-Masurian
- County: Szczytno
- Gmina: Szczytno

Kaspry [ˈkasprɨ] (German: Kaspersguth) is a village in the administrative district of Gmina Szczytno, within Szczytno County, Warmian-Masurian Voivodeship, in northern Poland.
