= Nowe Gizewo =

- Village
- Location within Poland
- Coordinates: 53°32′46″N 21°01′02″E
- Country: Poland
- Voivodeship: Warmian-Masurian
- County: Szczytno
- Gmina: Szczytno

Nowe Gizewo [ˈnɔvɛ ɡiˈzɛvɔ] (German: Neu Gisöwen) is a village in the administrative district of Gmina Szczytno, within Szczytno County, Warmian-Masurian Voivodeship, in northern Poland.
