= Kobyłocha =

- Village
- Location within Poland
- Coordinates: 53°38′N 20°56′E
- Country: Poland
- Voivodeship: Warmian-Masurian
- County: Szczytno
- Gmina: Szczytno

Kobyłocha [kɔbɨˈwɔxa] (German: Kobbelhals) is a village in the administrative district of Gmina Szczytno, within Szczytno County, Warmian-Masurian Voivodeship, in northern Poland.
