= Wawrochy =

- Village
- Location within Poland
- Coordinates: 53°32′N 21°6′E
- Country: Poland
- Voivodeship: Warmian-Masurian
- County: Szczytno
- Gmina: Szczytno

Wawrochy [vaˈvrɔxɨ] (German: Wawrochen; 1938–45: Deutschheide) is a village in the administrative district of Gmina Szczytno, within Szczytno County, Warmian-Masurian Voivodeship, in northern Poland.
