= Donji Lipovac =

Donji Lipovac may refer to:

- Donji Lipovac, Croatia, a village near Nova Kapela
- Donji Lipovac, Serbia, a village near Brus

== See also ==
- Lipovac (disambiguation)
