= Romany, Warmian-Masurian Voivodeship =

Romany
- Village
- Location within Poland
- Coordinates: 53°37′N 21°1′E
- Country: Poland
- Voivodeship: Warmian-Masurian
- County: Szczytno
- Gmina: Szczytno

Romany [rɔˈmanɨ] (German: Rohmanen) is a village in the administrative district of Gmina Szczytno, within Szczytno County, Warmian-Masurian Voivodeship, in northern Poland.
