= Wólka Szczycieńska =

- Village
- Location within Poland
- Coordinates: 53°31′49″N 20°57′15″E
- Country: Poland
- Voivodeship: Warmian-Masurian
- County: Szczytno
- Gmina: Szczytno

Wólka Szczycieńska [ˈvulka ʂt͡ʂɨˈt͡ɕɛɲska] (German: Lentzienen) is a village in the administrative district of Gmina Szczytno, within Szczytno County, Warmian-Masurian Voivodeship, in northern Poland.
