= Lipovača =

Lipovača may refer to:

- Lipovača, Vukovar-Syrmia County, a village near Vukovar, Croatia, population 426
- Lipovača, Karlovac County, a village near Rakovica, Croatia, population 195
- Lipovača, Šipovo, a village near Šipovo, Bosnia and Herzegovina
- Gornja Lipovača, a village near Bosanska Gradiška, Bosnia and Herzegovina

== See also ==
- Lipovac (disambiguation)
- Lipovica (disambiguation)
