= Ochódno =

- Village
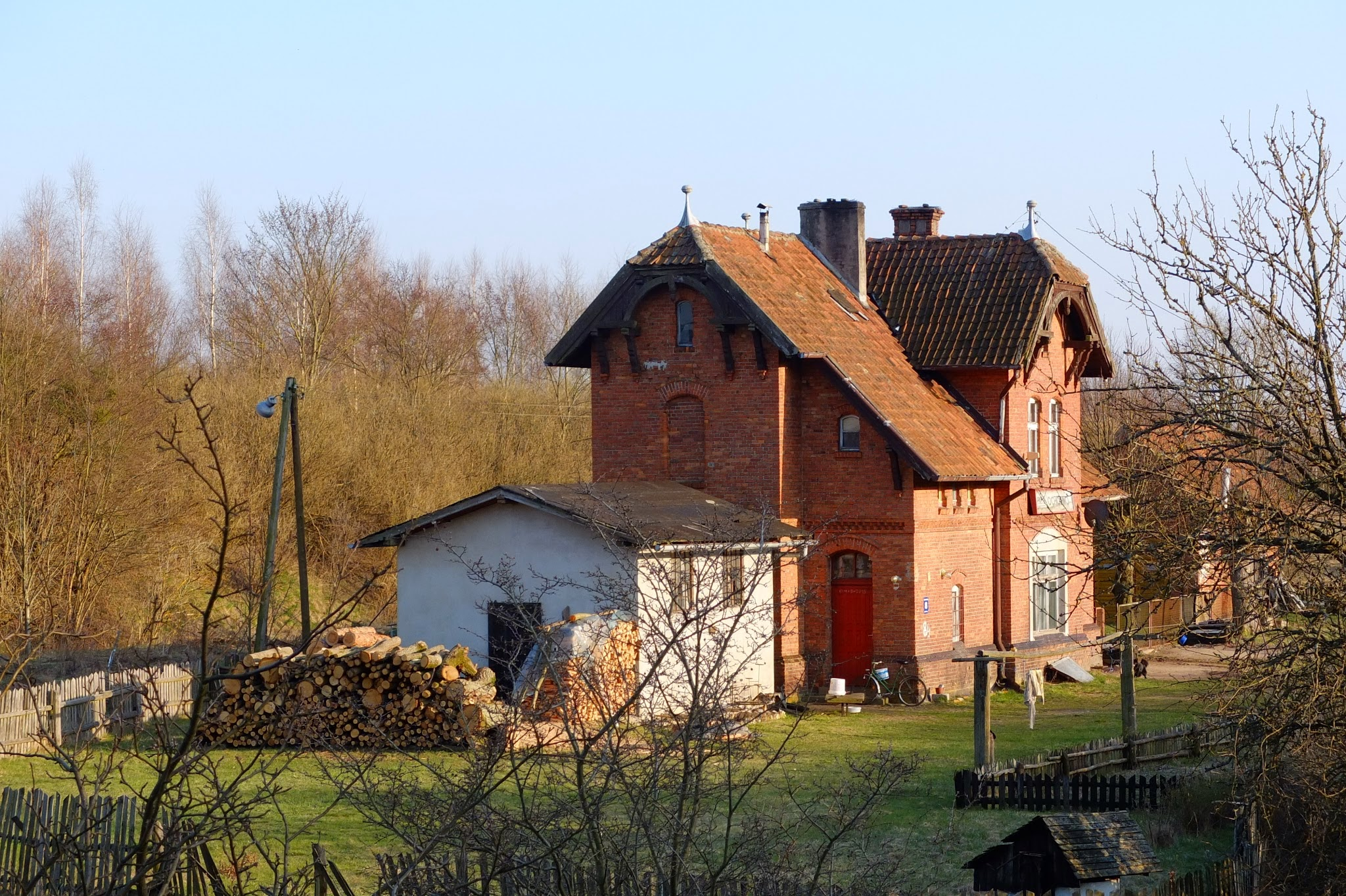
- Former train station

- Location within Poland
- Coordinates: 53°36′49″N 21°2′51″E
- Country: Poland
- Voivodeship: Warmian-Masurian
- County: Szczytno
- Gmina: Szczytno

Population
  - Total: 20

Ochódno [ɔˈxudnɔ] (German: Achodden; 1938-45: Neuvölklingen) is a village in the administrative district of Gmina Szczytno, within Szczytno County, Warmian-Masurian Voivodeship, in northern Poland.

The village has a population of 20.
