= Nowiny, Szczytno County =

Nowiny
- Village
- Location within Poland
- Coordinates: 53°30′13″N 20°58′08″E
- Country: Poland
- Voivodeship: Warmian-Masurian
- County: Szczytno
- Gmina: Szczytno
- Time zone: UTC+01:00 (CET)
  - Summer (DST): UTC+02:00 (CEST)

Nowiny [nɔˈvinɨ] (German: Neu Schiemanen) is a village in the administrative district of Gmina Szczytno, within Szczytno County, Warmian-Masurian Voivodeship, in northern Poland.
