= Lipovo =

Lipovo may refer to:

- Lipovo, Montenegro, a village in northern Montenegro
- Lipovo, Russia, name of several rural localities in Russia
