= Prusowy Borek =

- Village
- Location within Poland
- Coordinates: 53°32′N 21°5′E
- Country: Poland
- Voivodeship: Warmian-Masurian
- County: Szczytno
- Gmina: Szczytno

Prusowy Borek [pruˈsɔvɨ ˈbɔrɛk] (German: Preußenwalde) is a village in the administrative district of Gmina Szczytno, within Szczytno County, Warmian-Masurian Voivodeship, in northern Poland.
