= Wały, Szczytno County =

Wały
- Village
- Location within Poland
- Coordinates: 53°30′N 21°1′E
- Country: Poland
- Voivodeship: Warmian-Masurian
- County: Szczytno
- Gmina: Szczytno
- Population: 424

Wały [ˈvawɨ] (German: Wallendorf) is a village in the administrative district of Gmina Szczytno, within Szczytno County, Warmian-Masurian Voivodeship, in northern Poland.

The village has a population of 424.
