= Płozy, Gmina Szczytno =

Płozy
- Village
- Location within Poland
- Coordinates: 53°33′N 21°5′E
- Country: Poland
- Voivodeship: Warmian-Masurian
- County: Szczytno
- Gmina: Szczytno

Płozy [ˈpwɔzɨ] (German: Plohsen) is a village in the administrative district of Gmina Szczytno, within Szczytno County, Warmian-Masurian Voivodeship, in northern Poland.
