= Puzary =

- Village
- Location within Poland
- Coordinates: 53°29′00″N 21°11′06″E
- Country: Poland
- Voivodeship: Warmian-Masurian
- County: Szczytno
- Gmina: Szczytno

Puzary [puˈzarɨ] (German: Gut Wilhelmsthal) is a village in the administrative district of Gmina Szczytno, within Szczytno County, Warmian-Masurian Voivodeship, in northern Poland.

== People ==
- Kuno von der Goltz (1817–1897), prussian general

Weblinks
