= Jęcznik =

- Village
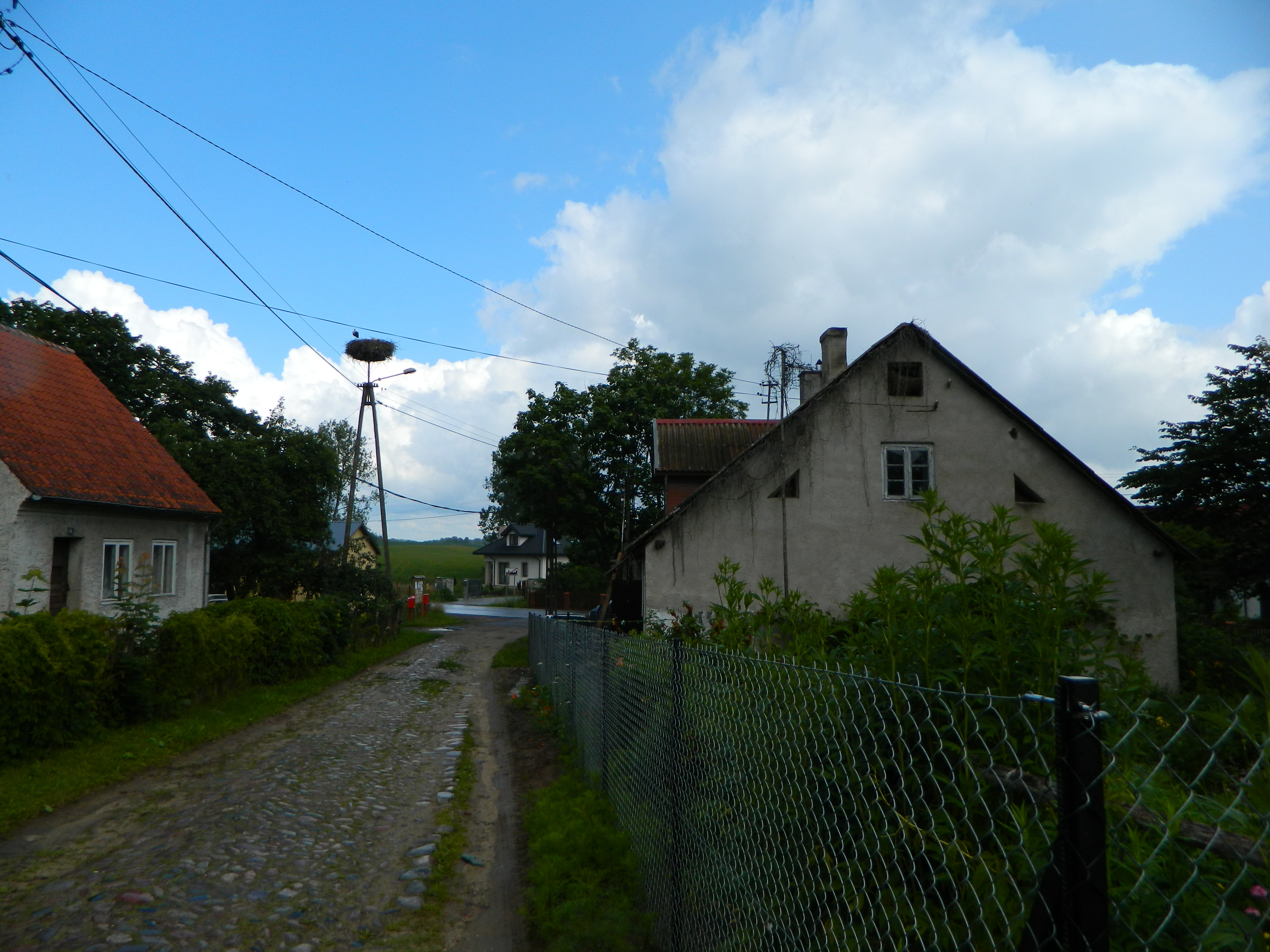
- Stork's nest in Jęcznik

- Location within Poland
- Coordinates: 53°36′20″N 20°53′41″E
- Country: Poland
- Voivodeship: Warmian-Masurian
- County: Szczytno
- Gmina: Szczytno
- Time zone: UTC+1 (CET)
  - Summer (DST): UTC+2 (CEST)
- Postal code: 12-100
- Vehicle registration: NSZ

Jęcznik [ˈjɛnt͡ʂnik] is a village in the administrative district of Gmina Szczytno, within Szczytno County, Warmian-Masurian Voivodeship, in northern Poland. It is situated on the southern shore of Sasek Wielki Lake in the region of Masuria.

The village was founded before 1684.
