= Rudka, Warmian-Masurian Voivodeship =

Rudka
- Village
- Location within Poland
- Coordinates: 53°33′N 21°3′E
- Country: Poland
- Voivodeship: Warmian-Masurian
- County: Szczytno
- Gmina: Szczytno
- Population: 440

Rudka [ˈrutka] (German: Hamerudau) is a village in the administrative district of Gmina Szczytno, within Szczytno County, Warmian-Masurian Voivodeship, in northern Poland.

The village has a population of 440.
