= Trelkowo =

- Village
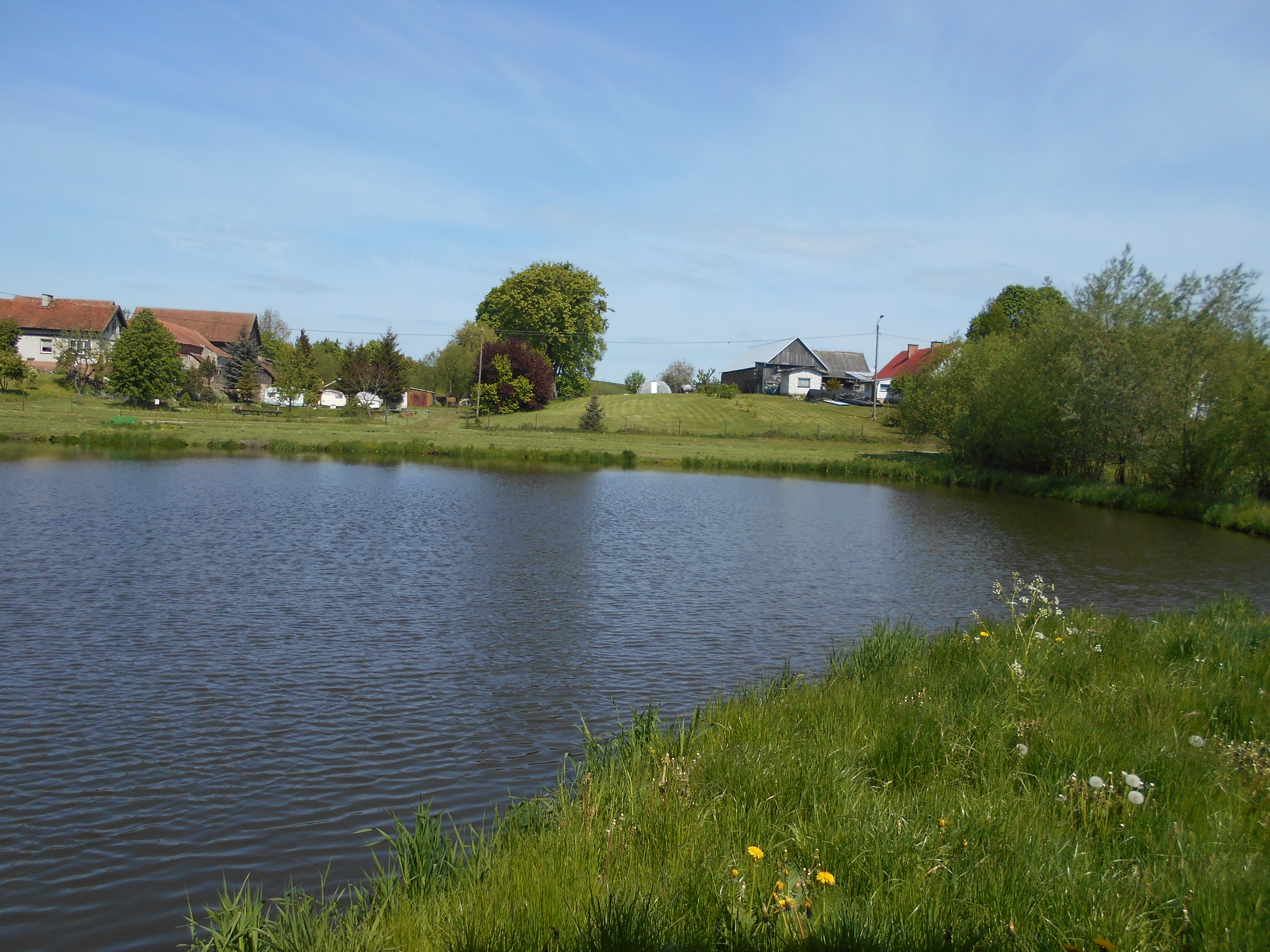
- Interactive map of Trelkowo
- Location within Poland
- Coordinates: 53°39′N 20°59′E
- Country: Poland
- Voivodeship: Warmian-Masurian
- County: Szczytno
- Gmina: Szczytno

Trelkowo [trɛlˈkɔvɔ] (German: Gross Schöndamerau) is a village in the administrative district of Gmina Szczytno, within Szczytno County, Warmian-Masurian Voivodeship, in northern Poland.
