= Piece, Warmian-Masurian Voivodeship =

Piece
- Village
- Location within Poland
- Coordinates: 53°36′4″N 20°54′29″E
- Country: Poland
- Voivodeship: Warmian-Masurian
- County: Szczytno
- Gmina: Szczytno
- Population: 180
- Time zone: UTC+1 (CET)
  - Summer (DST): UTC+2 (CEST)
- Vehicle registration: NSZ
- Primary airport: Olsztyn-Mazury Airport

Piece [ˈpjɛt͡sɛ] (German: Ulonskofen, 1938-45: Schobendorf) is a village in the administrative district of Gmina Szczytno, within Szczytno County, Warmian-Masurian Voivodeship, in northern Poland. It is located in the historic region of Masuria.

The village has a population of 180.

== History ==
At various times in the past, the village was part of Poland, Prussia and Germany. It became part of Poland once more following Germany's defeat in World War II in 1945.
