= Lemany, Warmian-Masurian Voivodeship =

Lemany
- Village
- Location within Poland
- Coordinates: 53°36′N 21°1′E
- Country: Poland
- Voivodeship: Warmian-Masurian
- County: Szczytno
- Gmina: Szczytno
- Time zone: UTC+1 (CET)
  - Summer (DST): UTC+2 (CEST)
- Vehicle registration: NSZ

Lemany [lɛˈmanɨ] is a village in the administrative district of Gmina Szczytno, within Szczytno County, Warmian-Masurian Voivodeship, in northern Poland.

It is located in Masuria.

== History ==
The village was founded by Polish settlers by 1414. As of 1602 the population was predominantly Polish.
