= Gawrzyjałki =

- Village
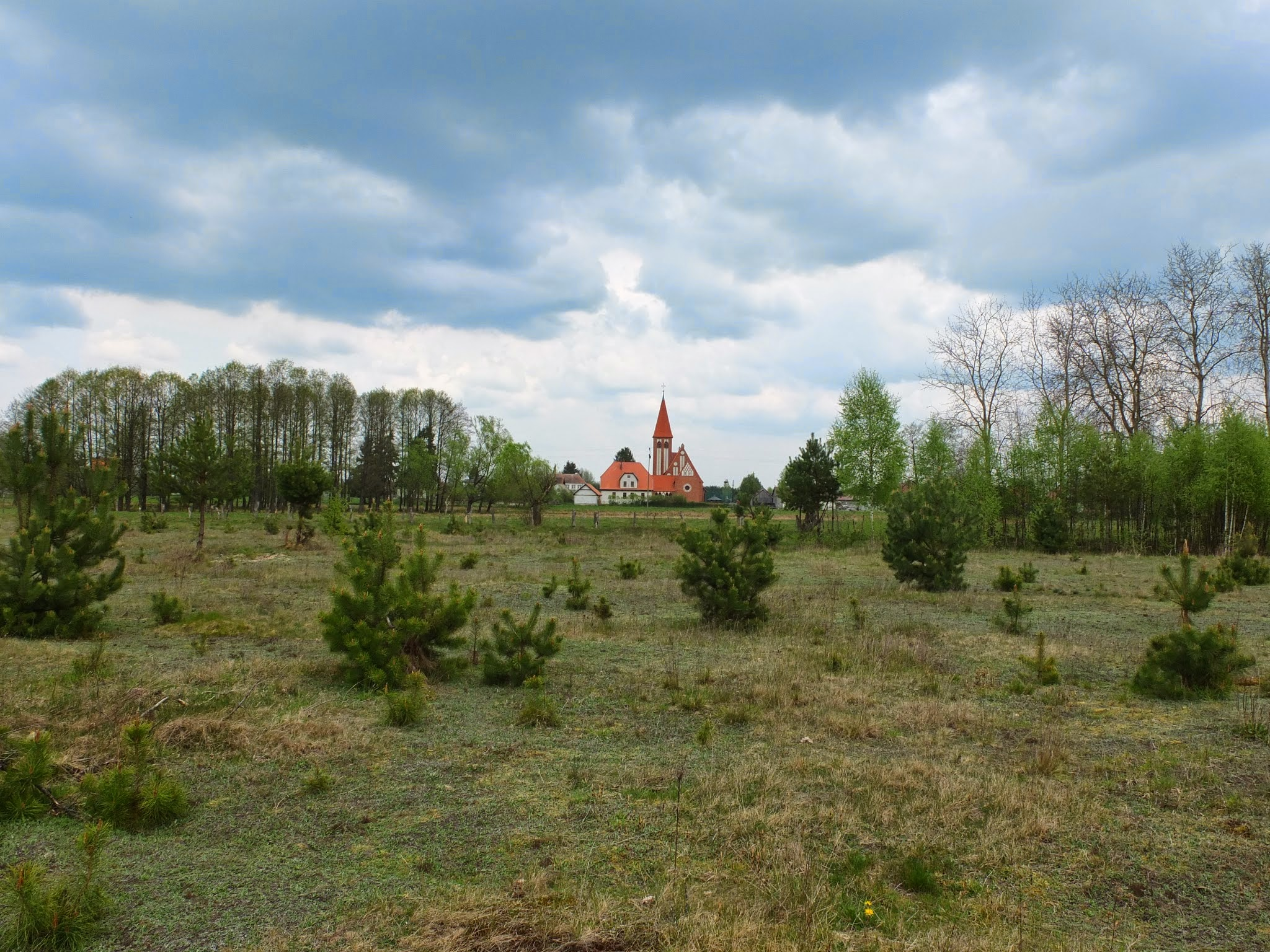

- Location within Poland
- Coordinates: 53°30′N 21°10′E
- Country: Poland
- Voivodeship: Warmian-Masurian
- County: Szczytno
- Gmina: Szczytno
- Population: 303

Gawrzyjałki [ɡavʐɨˈjau̯ki] (German: Wilhelmstal) is a village in the administrative district of Gmina Szczytno, within Szczytno County, Warmian-Masurian Voivodeship, in northern Poland.

The village has a population of 303.
