= Wałpusz =

- Village
- Location within Poland
- Coordinates: 53°35′49″N 21°03′42″E
- Country: Poland
- Voivodeship: Warmian-Masurian
- County: Szczytno
- Gmina: Szczytno
- Postal code: 12-100

Wałpusz [ˈvau̯puʂ] (German: Waldpusch) is a village in the administrative district of Gmina Szczytno, within Szczytno County, Warmian-Masurian Voivodeship, in northern Poland.

About 1785 there have been 12 households.
