= Leśny Dwór, Szczytno County =

Leśny Dwór
- Village
- Location within Poland
- Coordinates: 53°32′54″N 20°59′08″E
- Country: Poland
- Voivodeship: Warmian-Masurian
- County: Szczytno
- Gmina: Szczytno

Leśny Dwór [ˈlɛɕnɨ ˈdvur] is a village in the administrative district of Gmina Szczytno, within Szczytno County, Warmian-Masurian Voivodeship, in northern Poland.
