= Lipowa Góra Wschodnia =

- Village
- Location within Poland
- Coordinates: 53°34′41″N 21°00′19″E
- Country: Poland
- Voivodeship: Warmian-Masurian
- County: Szczytno
- Gmina: Szczytno

Lipowa Góra Wschodnia [liˈpɔva ˈɡura ˈfsxɔdɲa] (German: Lindenberg) is a village in the administrative district of Gmina Szczytno, within Szczytno County, Warmian-Masurian Voivodeship, in northern Poland.
