= Zielonka, Szczytno County =

Zielonka
- Village
- Location within Poland
- Coordinates: 53°37′N 21°3′E
- Country: Poland
- Voivodeship: Warmian-Masurian
- County: Szczytno
- Gmina: Szczytno

Zielonka [ʑɛˈlɔnka] (German: Seelonken) is a village in the administrative district of Gmina Szczytno, within Szczytno County, Warmian-Masurian Voivodeship, in northern Poland.
