= Dębówko, Warmian-Masurian Voivodeship =

Dębówko
- Village
- Location within Poland
- Coordinates: 53°36′N 20°57′E
- Country: Poland
- Voivodeship: Warmian-Masurian
- County: Szczytno
- Gmina: Szczytno
- Population: 144

Dębówko [dɛmˈbufkɔ] (German: Eichtal) is a village in the administrative district of Gmina Szczytno, within Szczytno County, Warmian-Masurian Voivodeship, in northern Poland.

The village has a population of 144.
