= Kamionek, Warmian-Masurian Voivodeship =

Kamionek
- Village
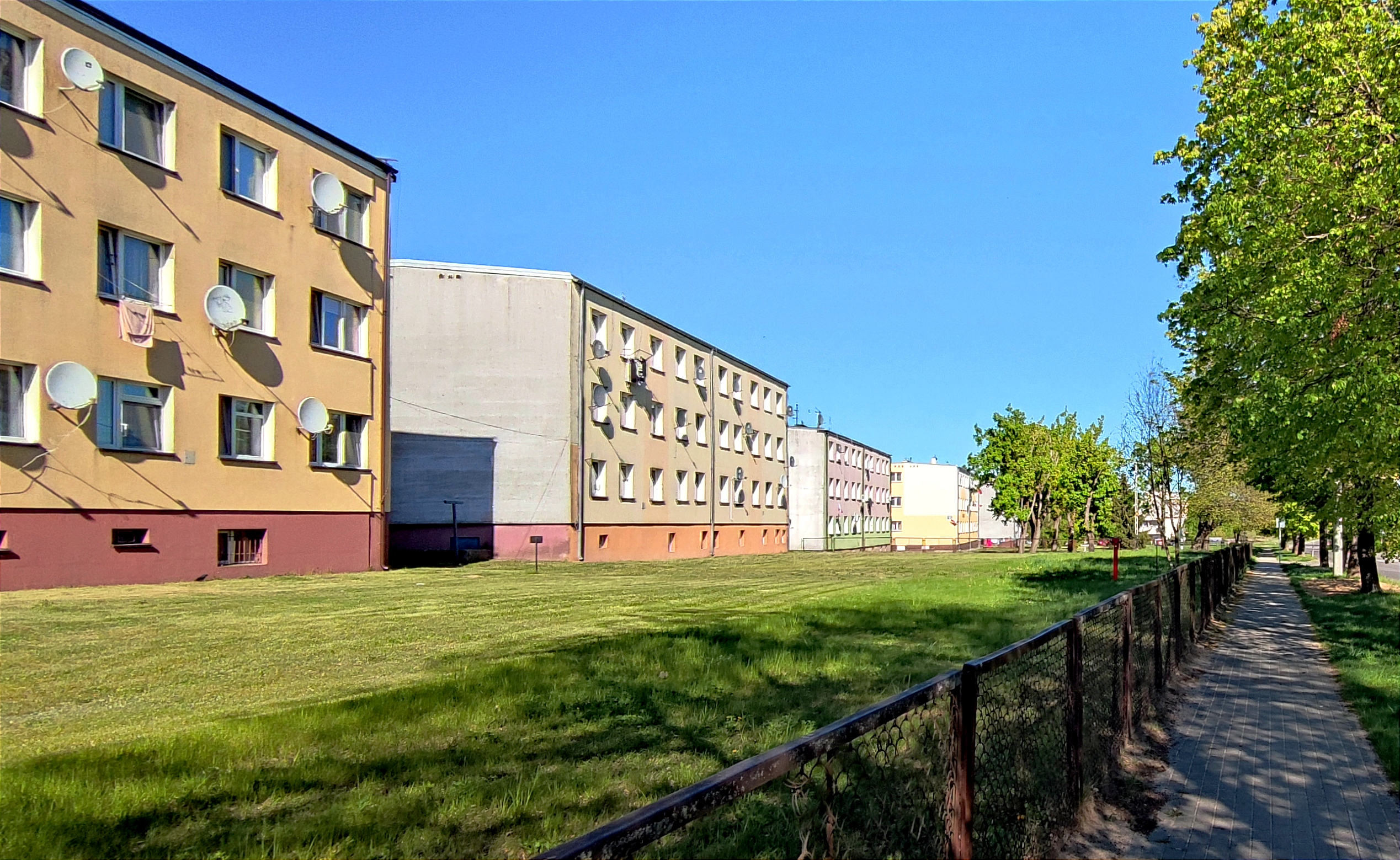
- Apartment buildings as seen from Podgórna street in May 2025

- Location within Poland
- Coordinates: 53°34′24″N 20°58′18″E
- Country: Poland
- Voivodeship: Warmian-Masurian
- County: Szczytno
- Gmina: Szczytno
- Population (2022): 1,098

Kamionek [kaˈmjɔnɛk] (German: Steinberg) is a village in the administrative district of Gmina Szczytno, within Szczytno County, Warmian-Masurian Voivodeship, in northern Poland. It borders Szczytno to the east and lake Długie to the south.

== Urban development ==
Kamionek was built as a residential estate of the Kamienna Góra state-owned farm, located west of Szczytno. The estate is located in the eastern part of the settlement and consists of several apartment blocks. Its core consists of nine blocks remaining from the state-owned farm. Two more blocks were built on the north side in the 2000s. The newest blocks were built on the eastern border in 2013. The estate also has sports fields and a library.

In the central part of the settlement, warehouses and industrial buildings are located, as well as many dilapidated farm buildings.

In the south, along the lake shore, single-family houses and allotment gardens dominate.

The western part also consists of single-family houses, but is characterized by larger plots. Its development is ongoing.

== Economy ==
The estate is a typical remnant of a defunct state-owned farm, experiencing lack of employment options.

A concrete plant, two wholesalers, two grocery stores, and a municipal waste sorting facility are located on its territory.

== Gallery ==
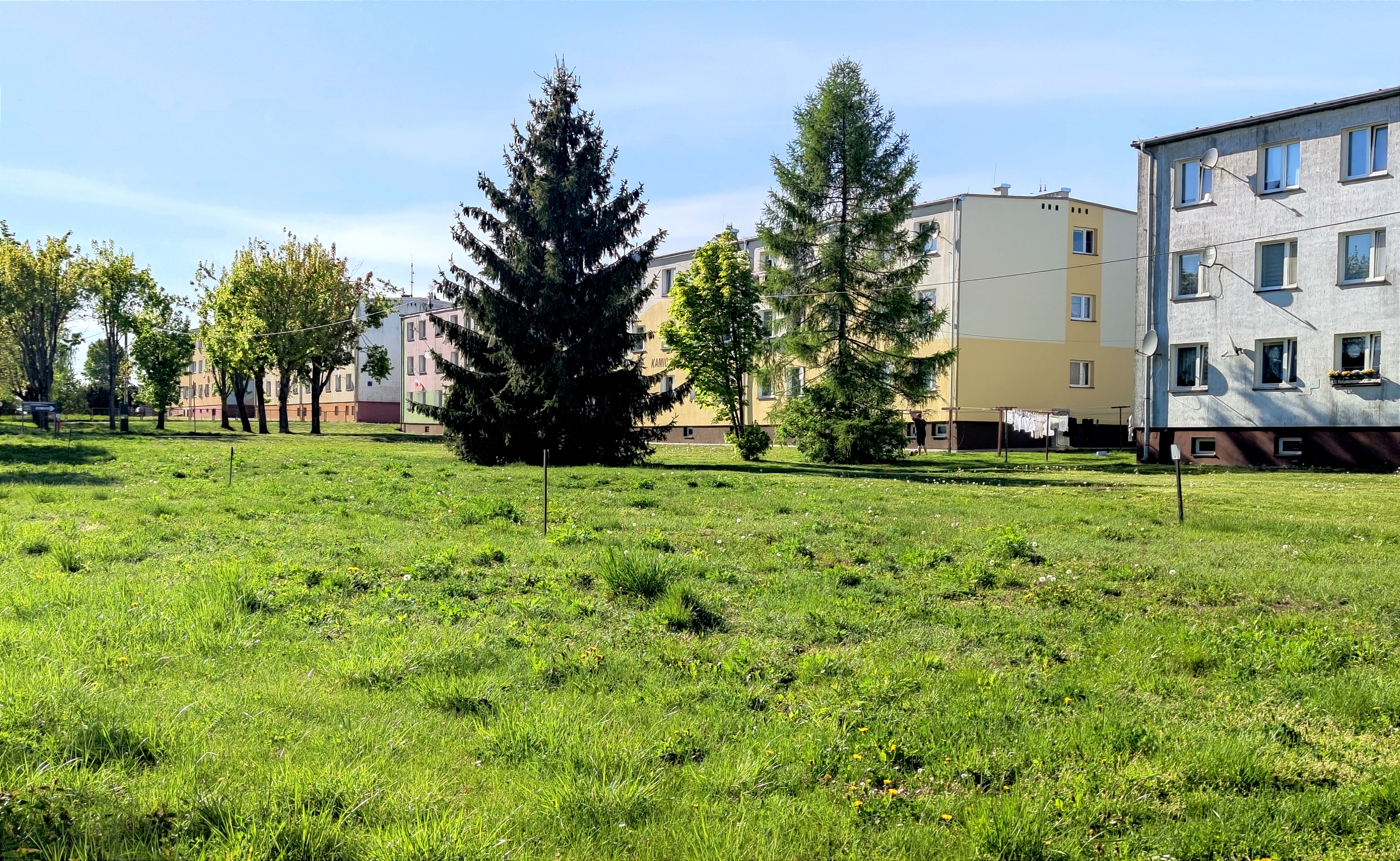
Apartment buildings in Kamionek as seen from SE

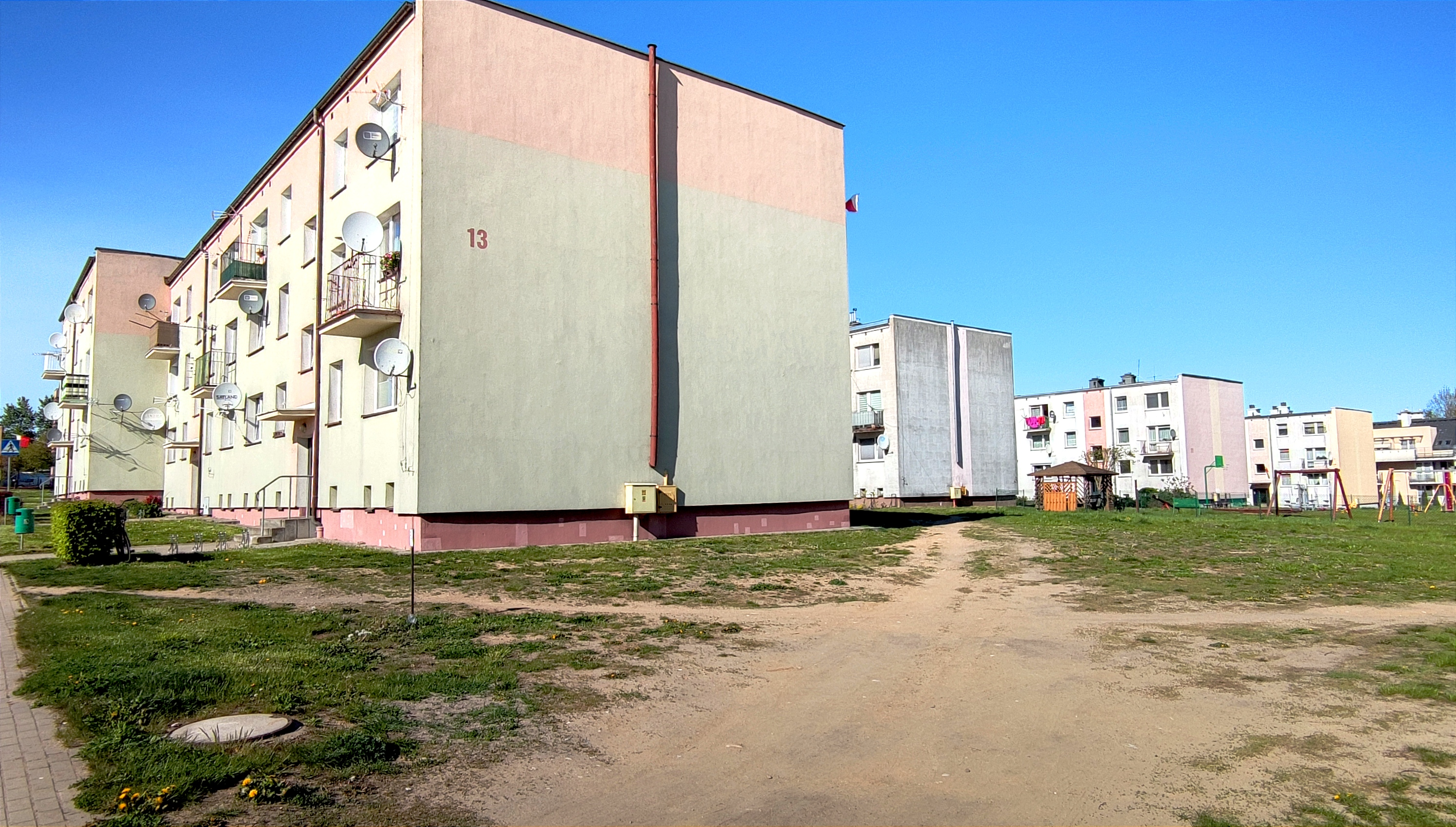
Residential estate backyards

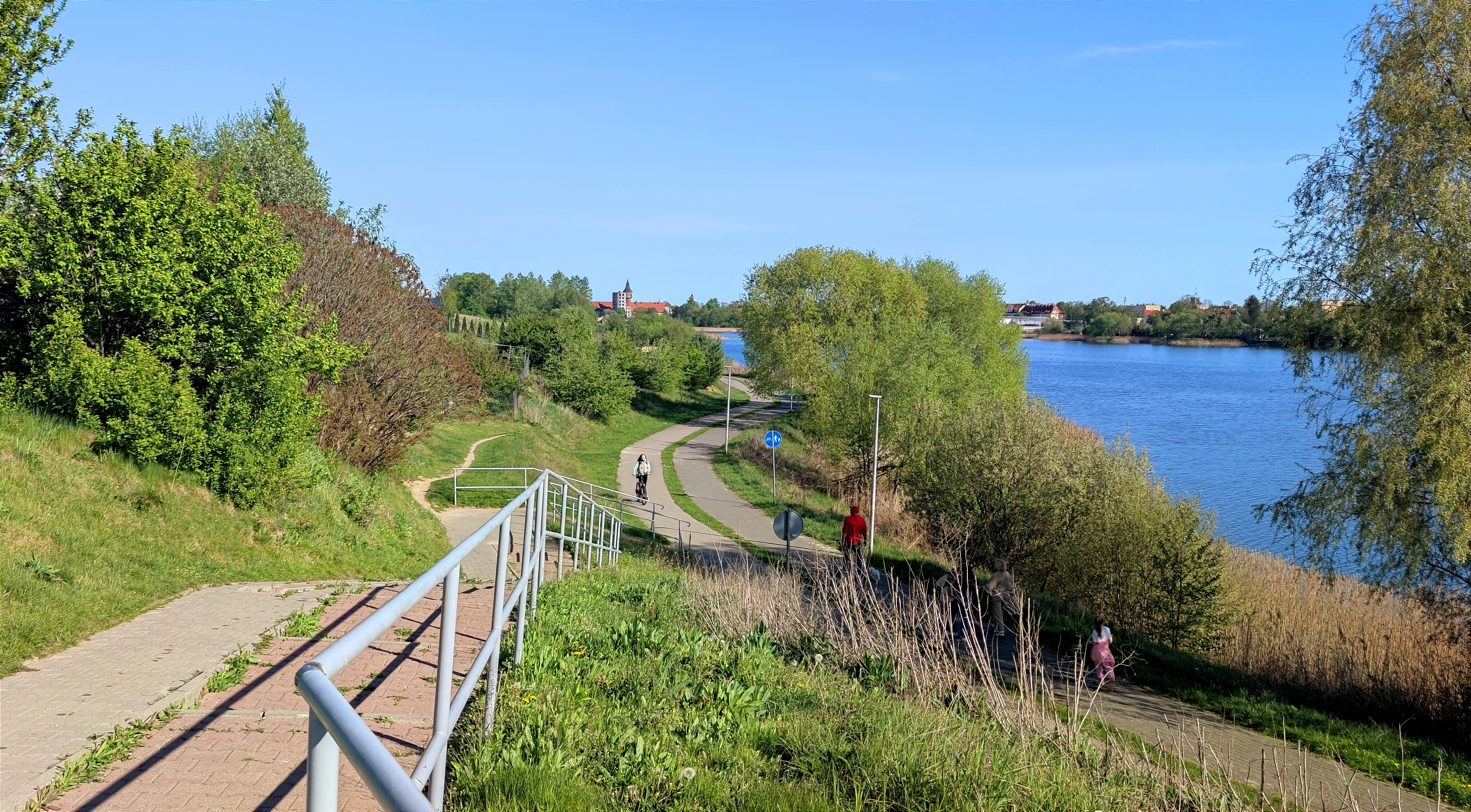
Długie Lake as seen from Kamionek
