= Nowe Dłutówko =

- Village
- Location within Poland
- Coordinates: 53°28′30″N 20°59′32″E
- Country: Poland
- Voivodeship: Warmian-Masurian
- County: Szczytno
- Gmina: Szczytno

Nowe Dłutówko [ˈnɔvɛ dwuˈtufkɔ] (German: Dlotowken) is a village in the administrative district of Gmina Szczytno, within Szczytno County, Warmian-Masurian Voivodeship, in northern Poland.
