= Niedźwiedzie, Szczytno County =

Niedźwiedzie
- Village
- Location within Poland
- Coordinates: 53°31′3″N 21°8′40″E
- Country: Poland
- Voivodeship: Warmian-Masurian
- County: Szczytno
- Gmina: Szczytno

Niedźwiedzie [ɲɛd͡ʑˈvjɛd͡ʑɛ] (German: Bärenbruch) is a village in the administrative district of Gmina Szczytno, within Szczytno County, Warmian-Masurian Voivodeship, in northern Poland.
