= Korpele =

- Village
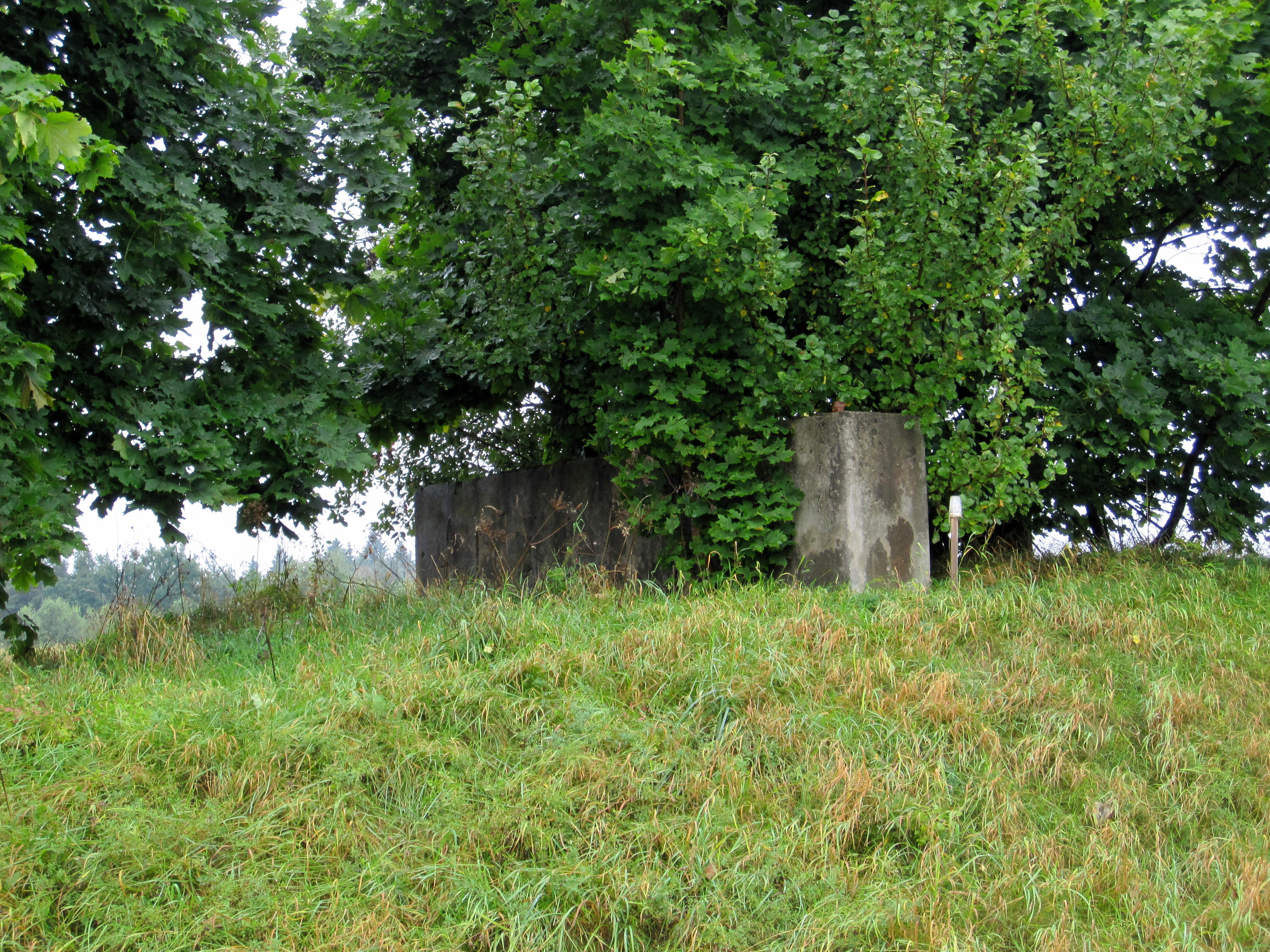

- Location within Poland
- Coordinates: 53°34′N 20°56′E
- Country: Poland
- Voivodeship: Warmian-Masurian
- County: Szczytno
- Gmina: Szczytno

Korpele [kɔrˈpɛlɛ] (German: Korpellen) is a village in the administrative district of Gmina Szczytno, within Szczytno County, Warmian-Masurian Voivodeship, in northern Poland.
