= Trelkówko =

- Village
- Interactive map of Trelkówko
- Location within Poland
- Coordinates: 53°39′37″N 20°57′22″E
- Country: Poland
- Voivodeship: Warmian-Masurian
- County: Szczytno
- Gmina: Szczytno
- Population: 160

Trelkówko [trɛlˈkufkɔ] (German: Klein Schöndamerau) is a village in the administrative district of Gmina Szczytno, within Szczytno County, Warmian-Masurian Voivodeship, in northern Poland.

The village has a population of 160.
