= Sędańsk =

- Village
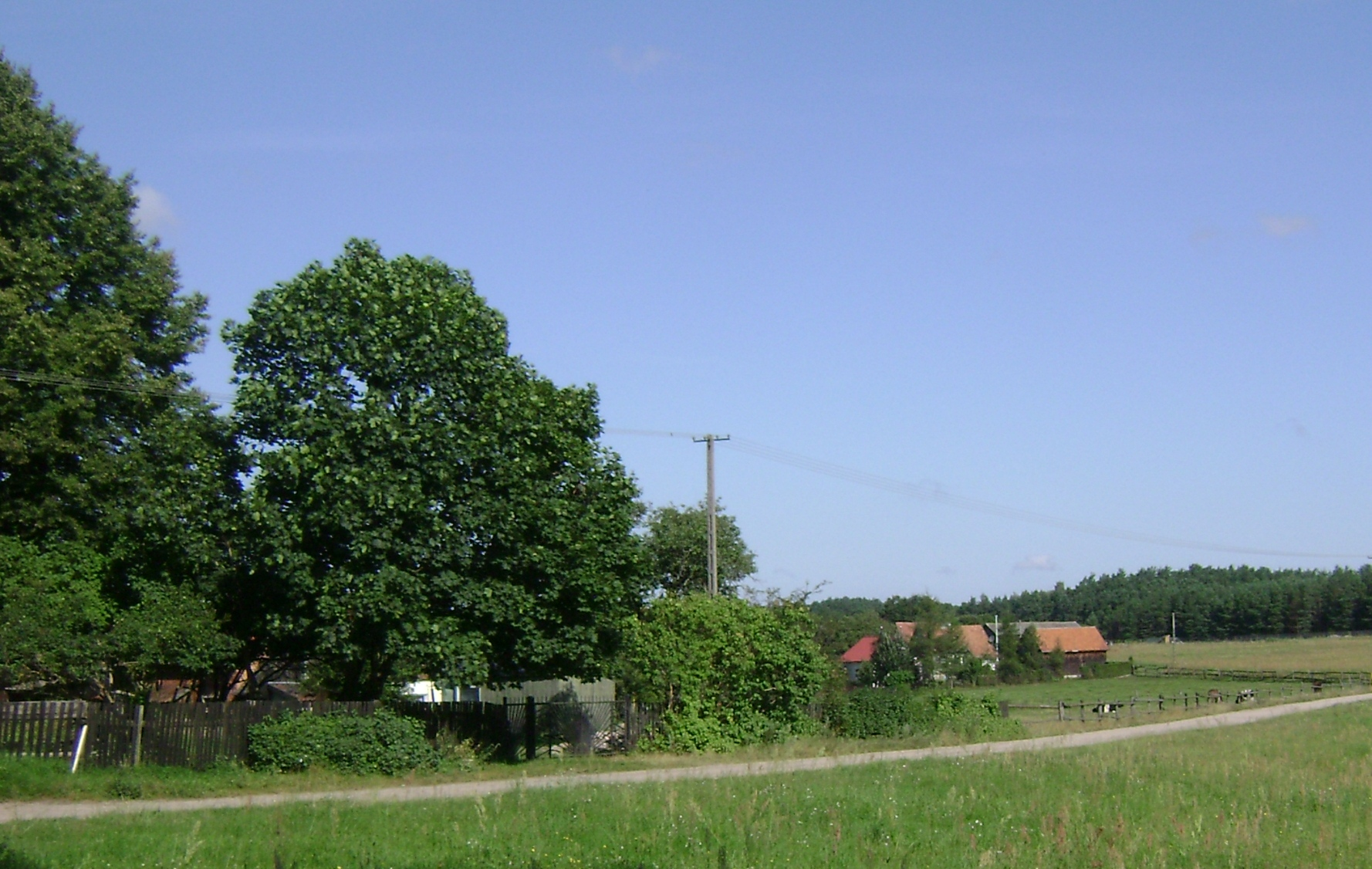

- Location within Poland
- Coordinates: 53°34′N 20°55′E
- Country: Poland
- Voivodeship: Warmian-Masurian
- County: Szczytno
- Gmina: Szczytno

Sędańsk [ˈsɛndaɲsk] (German: Seedanzig) is a village in the administrative district of Gmina Szczytno, within Szczytno County, Warmian-Masurian Voivodeship, in northern Poland.
