= Lipovo, Tula Oblast =

Rural locality in Shchyokinsky District, Tula Oblast, Russia

Coordinates: 53°43′26″N 37°30′15″E

Lipovo (Russian: Ли́пово) is a village (selo) in Shchyokinsky District of Tula Oblast, Russia.
