= Blizhny, Volgograd Oblast =

Blizhny Ближний
- Khutor
- Location within Volgograd Oblast Location within Russia
- Coordinates: 49°51′N 42°58′E
- Country: Russia
- Region: Volgograd Oblast
- District: Kumylzhensky District
- Time zone: UTC+4:00

Blizhny (Russian: Ближний) is a rural locality (a khutor) in Glazunovskoye Rural Settlement, Kumylzhensky District, Volgograd Oblast, Russia. The population was 2 as of 2010.

== Geography ==
Blizhny is located in forest steppe, on Khopyorsko-Buzulukskaya Plain, 33 km east of Kumylzhenskaya (the district's administrative centre) by road. Stoylovsky is the nearest rural locality.
