= Klyuchiki (Kultayevskoye Rural Settlement), Permsky District, Perm Krai =

Klyuchiki Ключики
- Village
- Location within Perm Krai Location within Russia
- Coordinates: 57°47′N 55°45′E
- Country: Russia
- Region: Perm Krai
- District: Permsky District
- Time zone: UTC+5:00

Klyuchiki (Russian: Ключики) is a rural locality (a village) in Kultayevskoye Rural Settlement, Permsky District, Perm Krai, Russia. The total population was 85 as of 2010. There are 11 streets.

== Geography ==
Klyuchiki is located 50 km south of Perm (the district's administrative centre) by road. Kukushtan is the nearest rural locality.
