= Sasek Mały =

- Village
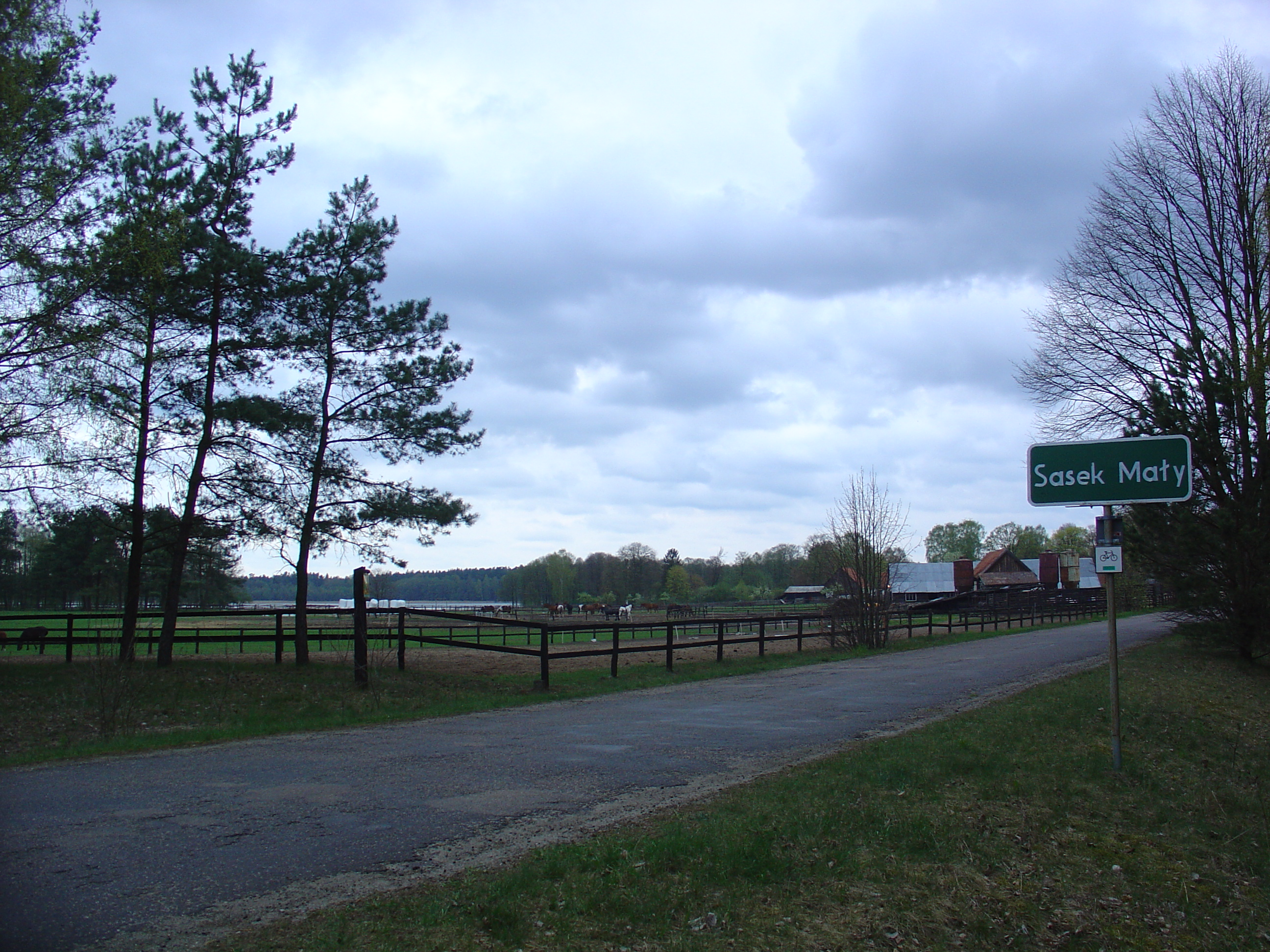

- Location within Poland
- Coordinates: 53°30′N 20°53′E
- Country: Poland
- Voivodeship: Warmian-Masurian
- County: Szczytno
- Gmina: Szczytno

Sasek Mały [ˈsasɛk ˈmawɨ] (German: Paterschobensee) is a village in the administrative district of Gmina Szczytno, within Szczytno County, Warmian-Masurian Voivodeship, in northern Poland.
