= Blizhny, Kursk Oblast =

Rural locality in Kursk Oblast, Russia

Blizhny Ближний
- Khutor
- Interactive map of Blizhny
- Location of Blizhny Blizhny (Kursk Oblast)
- Coordinates: 51°22′23″N 36°05′39″E
- Country: Russia
- Federal subject: Kursk Oblast
- Administrative district: Medvensky District
- SelsovietSelsoviet: Nizhnereutchansky

Population (2010 Census)
  - Total: 50
  - Estimate (2010): 50 (0%)

Municipal status
  - Municipal district: Medvensky Municipal District
  - Rural settlement: Nizhnereutchansky Selsoviet Rural Settlement
- Time zone: UTC+3 (MSK)
- Postal code: 307047
- Dialing code: +7 47146
- OKTMO ID: 38624436111
- Website: nizhnezeut.rkursk.ru

Blizhny (Russian: Ближний) is a rural locality (a khutor) in Nizhnereutchansky Selsoviet Rural Settlement, Medvensky District, Kursk Oblast, Russia. Population: 50 (2010 census); 61 (2002 census);

== Geography ==
The khutor is located on the Reut River (a left tributary of the Seym), 60 km from the Russia–Ukraine border, 37 km south-west of Kursk, 4.5 km south-west of the district center – the urban-type settlement Medvenka, 4 km from the selsoviet center – Nizhny Reutets.

Climate

Blizhny has a warm-summer humid continental climate (Dfb in the Köppen climate classification).

== Transport ==
Blizhny is located 4 km from the federal route M-2 Crimea Highway (a part of the European route E105), 2.5 km from the road of intermunicipal significance 38H-185 (M2 "Crimea Highway" – Gakhovo), 30.5 km from the nearest railway halt 457 km (railway line Lgov I — Kursk).

The rural locality is situated 44 km from Kursk Vostochny Airport, 86 km from Belgorod International Airport and 223 km from Voronezh Peter the Great Airport.
