= Sasek Wielki =

- Village
- Location within Poland
- Coordinates: 53°31′N 20°55′E
- Country: Poland
- Voivodeship: Warmian-Masurian
- County: Szczytno
- Gmina: Szczytno

Sasek Wielki (Polish pronunciation: [ˈsasɛɡ ˈvjɛlkʲi]; German: Materschobensee) is a village in the administrative district of Gmina Szczytno, within Szczytno County, Warmian-Masurian Voivodeship, in northern Poland.
