= Lipovo, Nikolsky District, Vologda Oblast =

Lipovo Липово
- Village
- Location within Vologda Oblast Location within Russia
- Coordinates: 59°22′N 45°33′E
- Country: Russia
- Region: Vologda Oblast
- District: Nikolsky District
- Time zone: UTC+3:00

Lipovo (Russian: Липово) is a rural locality (a village) in Permasskoye Rural Settlement, Nikolsky District, Vologda Oblast, Russia. The population was 40 as of 2002.

== Geography ==
Lipovo is located 25 km south of Nikolsk (the district's administrative centre) by road. Storozhevaya is the nearest rural locality.
