= Lipovo, Dobryanka, Perm Krai =

Lipovo Липово
- Village
- Location within Perm Krai Location within Russia
- Coordinates: 58°32′N 56°17′E
- Country: Russia
- Region: Perm Krai
- District: Dobryansky District
- Time zone: UTC+5:00

Lipovo (Russian: Липово) is a rural locality (a village) in Dobryansky District, Perm Krai, Russia. The population was 264 as of 2010. There are 8 streets.

== Geography ==
Lipovo is located 18 km northwest of Dobryanka (the district's administrative centre) by road. Rogovik is the nearest rural locality.
