= Krasnaya Polyana, Republic of Bashkortostan =

Krasnaya Polyana Красная Поляна
- Village
- Location within Bashkortostan Location within Russia
- Coordinates: 54°15′N 54°49′E
- Country: Russia
- Region: Bashkortostan
- District: Davlekanovsky District
- Time zone: UTC+5:00

Krasnaya Polyana (Russian: Красная Поляна) is a rural locality (a village) in Mikyashevsky Selsoviet, Davlekanovsky District, Bashkortostan, Russia. The population was 66 as of 2010. There are 2 streets.

== Geography ==
Krasnaya Polyana is located 17 km west of Davlekanovo (the district's administrative centre) by road. Kirovo is the nearest rural locality.
