= Gornji Lipovac =

Gornji Lipovac may refer to:

- Gornji Lipovac, Serbia, a village near Brus
- Gornji Lipovac, Croatia, a village near Nova Kapela
