= Polyana, Republic of Bashkortostan =

Polyana Поляна
- Settlement
- Location within Bashkortostan Location within Russia
- Coordinates: 54°31′N 55°55′E
- Country: Russia
- Region: Bashkortostan
- District: Ufa
- Time zone: UTC+5:00

Polyana (Russian: Поляна) is a rural locality (a settlement) in Ufa, Bashkortostan, Russia. The population was 54 as of 2010. There is 1 street.

== Geography ==
Polyana is located 27 km south of Ufa. Iskinois the nearest rural locality.
