= Polyana, Astrakhan Oblast =

Polyana Поляна
- Settlement
- Location within Astrakhan Oblast Location within Russia
- Coordinates: 46°19′N 48°06′E
- Country: Russia
- Region: Astrakhan Oblast
- District: Privolzhsky District
- Time zone: UTC+4:00

Polyana (Russian: Поляна) is a rural locality (a settlement) in Tryokhprotoksky Selsoviet, Privolzhsky District, Astrakhan Oblast, Russia. The population was 48 as of 2010. There are 6 streets.

== Geography ==
Polyana is located 9 km southwest of Nachalovo (the district's administrative centre) by road. Tri Protoka is the nearest rural locality.
