= Yasnaya Polyana, Republic of Dagestan =

Rural locality in Russia

Yasnaya Polyana Ясная Поляна
- Selo
- Location within Republic of Dagestan Location within Russia
- Coordinates: 43°57′N 46°46′E
- Country: Russia
- Region: Republic of Dagestan
- District: Kizlyarsky District
- Time zone: UTC+3:00

Yasnaya Polyana (Russian: Ясная Поляна) is a rural locality (a selo) and the administrative centre of Yasnopolyansky Selsoviet, Kizlyarsky District, Republic of Dagestan, Russia. The population was 1,671 as of 2010. There are 8 streets.

== Geography ==
Yasnaya Polyana is located 13 km northeast of Kizlyar (the district's administrative centre) by road. Dalneye and Kenafnyy Zavod are the nearest rural localities.

== Nationalities ==
Avars live there.
