= Bolshaya, Arkhangelsk =

Bolshaya Большая
- Village
- Location within Arkhangelsk Oblast Location within Russia
- Coordinates: 61°38′N 45°37′E
- Country: Russia
- Region: Arkhangelsk Oblast
- District: Krasnoborsky District
- Time zone: UTC+3:00

Bolshaya (Russian: Большая) is a rural locality (a village) and the administrative center of Permogorskoye Rural Settlement, Krasnoborsky District, Arkhangelsk Oblast, Russia. The population was 416 as of 2010. There are 16 streets.

== Geography ==
Bolshaya is located 20 km northwest of Krasnoborsk (the district's administrative centre) by road. Pridvornye Mesta is the nearest rural locality.
