= Lipowiec, Szczytno County =

Lipowiec
- Village
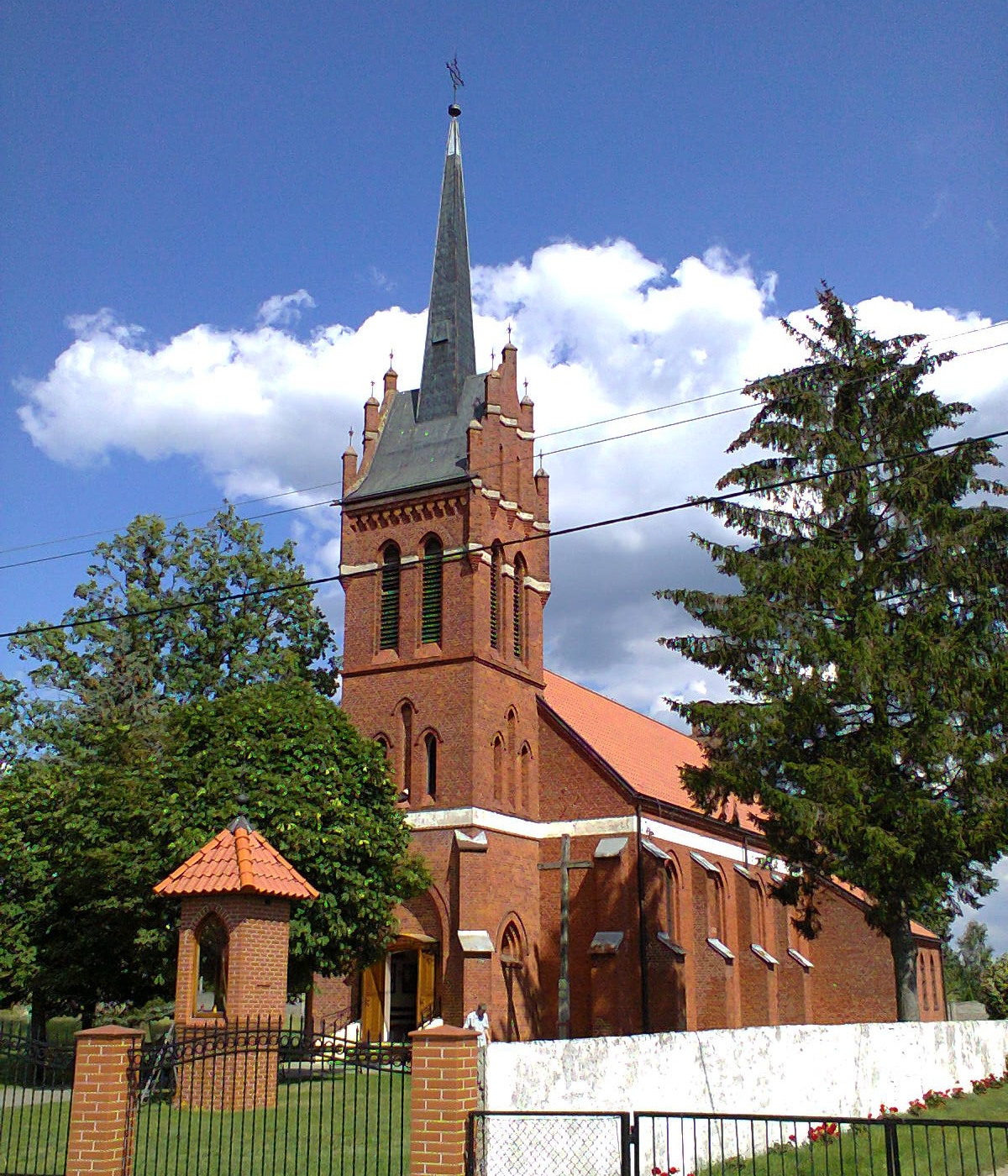
- Saint Valentine church in Lipowiec

- Location within Poland
- Coordinates: 53°28′N 21°8′E
- Country: Poland
- Voivodeship: Warmian-Masurian
- County: Szczytno
- Gmina: Szczytno
- Population: 863
- Time zone: UTC+1 (CET)
  - Summer (DST): UTC+2 (CEST)
- Vehicle registration: NSZ
- Primary airport: Olsztyn-Mazury Airport

Lipowiec [liˈpɔvjɛt͡s] (German: Lipowitz; 1933-45: Lindenort) is a village in the administrative district of Gmina Szczytno, within Szczytno County, Warmian-Masurian Voivodeship, in northern Poland. It is located in the historic region of Masuria.

The village has a population of 863.

== History ==
In the past, the territory was at various times part of Poland, Prussia and Germany. In 1933, the German administration renamed the village to Lindenort to erase traces of Polish origin. In 1945, following Germany's defeat in World War II, the region became again part of Poland and the historic name of the village was restored.
