= Lipovec, Rimavská Sobota District =

Lipovec Gömörlipóc
- Municipality
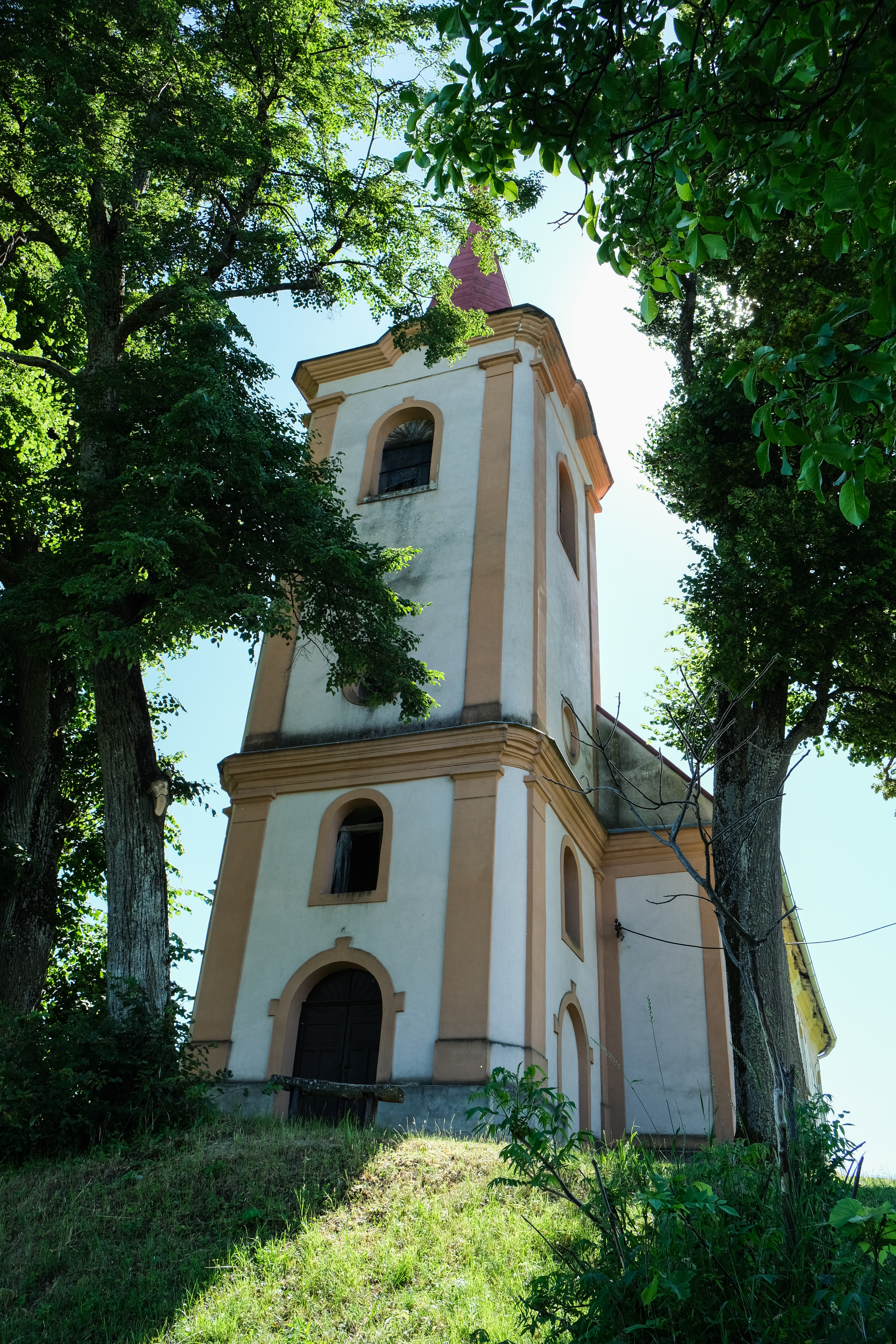

- Flag

- Location of Lipovec in the Banská Bystrica Region Location of Lipovec in Slovakia
- Coordinates: 48°33′00″N 20°03′53″E
- Country: Slovakia
- Region: Banská Bystrica Region
- District: Rimavská Sobota District
- First mentioned: 1413

Area
  - Total: 4.09 km^{2} (1.58 sq mi)
- Elevation: 510 m (1,670 ft)

Population (2025)
  - Total: 86
- Time zone: UTC+1 (CET)
  - Summer (DST): UTC+2 (CEST)
- Postal code: 980 23
- Area code: +421 47
- Vehicle registration plate (until 2022): RS
- Website: www.obeclipovec.sk

Lipovec (Hungarian: Gömörlipóc) is a village and municipality in the Rimavská Sobota District of the Banská Bystrica Region of southern Slovakia.

== Population ==
Population statistic (10 years)
Year	1995	2005	2015	2025
Count	85	75	105	86
Difference		−11.76%	+40%	−18.09%

Population statistic
Year	2024	2025
Count	90	86
Difference		−4.44%

It has a population of 86 people (31 December 2025).

=== Ethnicity ===
Census 2021 (1+ %)
Ethnicity	Number	Fraction
Slovak	86	95.55%
Hungarian	6	6.66%
Not found out	3	3.33%
Czech	1	1.11%
Romani	1	1.11%
Total	90	

In year 2021 was 90 people by ethnicity 86 as Slovak, 6 as Hungarian, 3 as Not found out, 1 as Czech and 1 as Romani.

Note on population: The difference values of population numbers in the table "Population statistic" and in the sections "Ethnicity" & "Religion" is caused by the use of various statistical methods.

=== Religion ===
Census 2021 (1+ %)
Religion	Number	Fraction
Roman Catholic Church	68	75.56%
None	12	13.33%
Evangelical Church	8	8.89%
Not found out	2	2.22%
Total	90	

In year 2021 was 90 people by religion 68 from Roman Catholic Church, 12 from None, 8 from Evangelical Church and 2 from Not found out.
