= Bolshaya Polyana =

Bolshaya Polyana (Russian: Больша́я Поля́на) is the name of several rural localities in Russia:

- Bolshaya Polyana, Kaliningrad Oblast, a settlement in Znamensky Rural Okrug of Gvardeysky District in Kaliningrad Oblast
- Bolshaya Polyana, Lipetsk Oblast (or Bolshaya polyana), a selo in Bolshepolyansky Selsoviet of Terbunsky District in Lipetsk Oblast; 52°8′N 38°41′E
- Bolshaya Polyana, Republic of Mordovia, a selo in Bolshepolyansky Selsoviet of Kadoshkinsky District in the Republic of Mordovia; 54°0′N 44°19′E
- Bolshaya Polyana, Novosibirsk Oblast, a settlement in Kochenyovsky District of Novosibirsk Oblast
- Bolshaya Polyana, Rostov Oblast, a settlement in Gashunskoye Rural Settlement of Zimovnikovsky District in Rostov Oblast
- Bolshaya Polyana, Republic of Tatarstan, a village in Alkeyevsky District of the Republic of Tatarstan
