= Polyana, Klintsovsky District, Bryansk Oblast =

Polyana Поляна
- Settlement
- Location within Bryansk Oblast Location within Russia
- Coordinates: 52°33′N 32°17′E
- Country: Russia
- Region: Bryansk Oblast
- District: Klintsovsky District
- Time zone: UTC+3:00

Polyana (Russian: Поляна) is a rural locality (a settlement) in Klintsovsky District, Bryansk Oblast, Russia. The population was 43 as of 2010. There is 1 street.

== Geography ==
Polyana is located 28 km south of Klintsy (the district's administrative centre) by road. Malaya Topal is the nearest rural locality.
