= Seryshevo =

Seryshevo Серышево
- work settlement
- Interactive map of Seryshevo
- Location of Seryshevo Seryshevo (Amur Oblast)
- Coordinates: 51°05′37″N 128°22′47″E
- Country: Russia
- Federal subject: Amur Oblast
- Administrative district: Seryshevsky District
- Founded: 1935

Government
  - Head: Denis Yakunin
- Elevation: 150 m (490 ft)

Population (2010 Census)
  - Total: 10,816
  - Estimate (2025): 9,253 (−14.5%)

Administrative status
  - Capital of: Seryshevsky District

Municipal status
  - Municipal district: Seryshevsky Municipal District
  - Urban settlement: Work Settlement Seryshevo Urban Settlement
  - Capital of: Seryshevsky Municipal District, Work Settlement Seryshevo Urban Settlement
- Time zone: UTC+9 (MSK+6)
- Postal code: 676350–676355
- OKTMO ID: 10647151051

Seryshevo (Russian: Се́рышево) is an urban locality (a work settlement) and the administrative center of Seryshevsky District of Amur Oblast, Russia. Population: 10,816 (2010 census); 12,186 (2002 census); 13,456 (1989 Soviet census).
