= Seryshevsky District =

Seryshevsky District Серышевский район (Russian)
- District
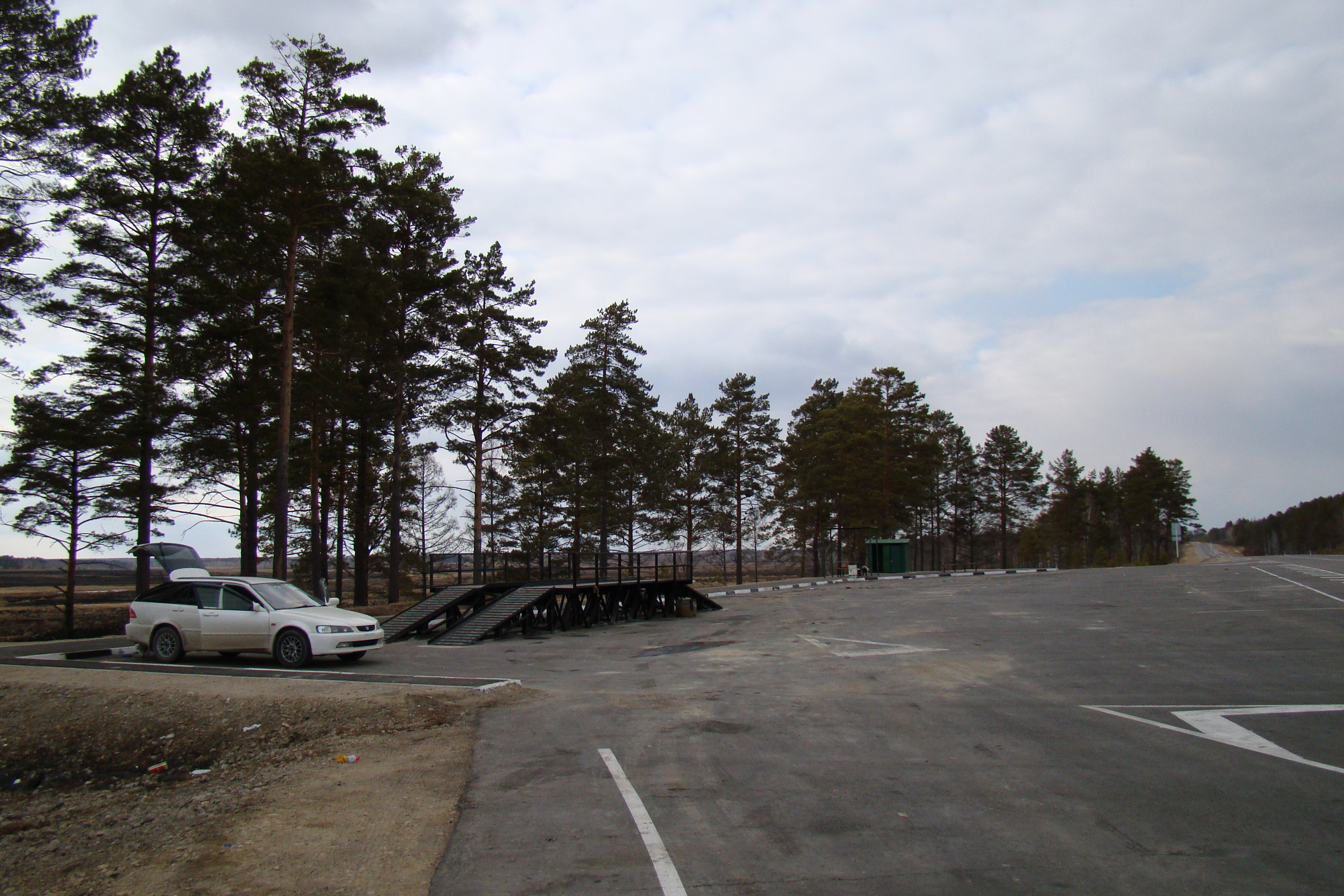
- Road rest stop in Seryshevsky District

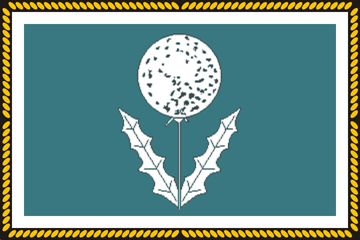
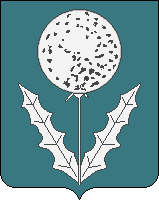
- Flag Coat of arms
- Location of Seryshevsky District in Amur Oblast
- Coordinates: 51°06′N 128°22′E
- Country: Russia
- Federal subject: Amur Oblast
- Established: 1935
- Administrative center: Seryshevo

Area
  - Total: 3,805 km^{2} (1,469 sq mi)

Population (2010 Census)
  - Total: 25,725
  - Density: 6.761/km^{2} (17.51/sq mi)
  - Urban: 42.0%
  - Rural: 58.0%

Administrative structure
  - Administrative divisions: 1 Urban settlements, 14 Rural settlements
  - Inhabited localities: 1 urban-type settlements, 47 rural localities

Municipal structure
  - Municipally incorporated as: Seryshevsky Municipal District
  - Municipal divisions: 1 urban settlements, 14 rural settlements
- Time zone: UTC+9 (MSK+6)
- OKTMO ID: 10647000
- Website: http://admser.e-stile.ru

Seryshevsky District (Russian: Се́рышевский райо́н) is an administrative and municipal district (raion), one of the twenty in Amur Oblast, Russia. The area of the district is 3,805 square kilometers (1,469 sq mi). Its administrative center is the urban locality (a work settlement) of Seryshevo. Population: 25,725 (2010 census); 29,440 (2002 Census); 35,969 (1989 Soviet census). The population of Seryshevo accounts for 42.0% of the district's population.
