= Stanisław Zarzecki =

Corporal pilot of the Polish Armed Forces

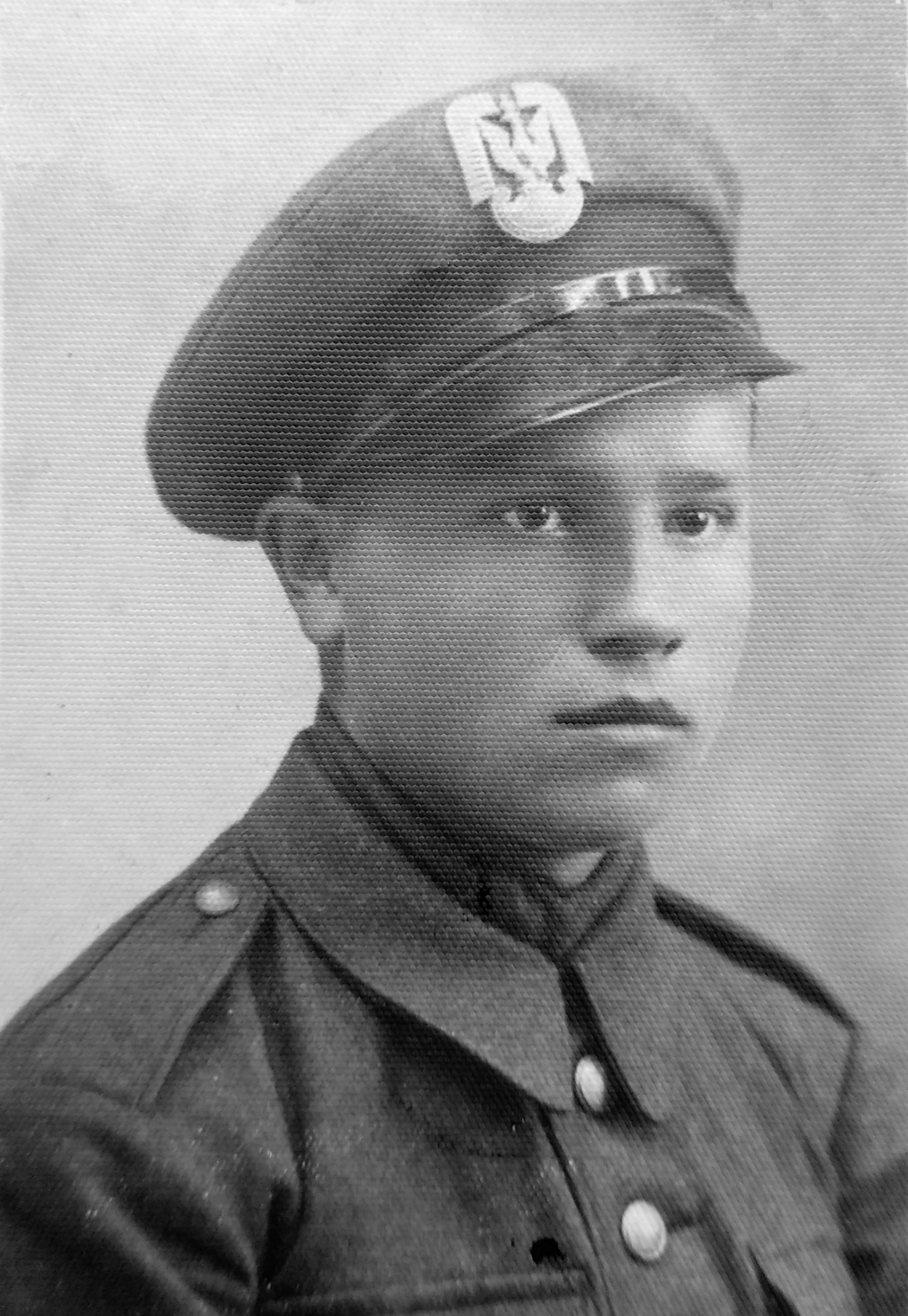
- S. Zarzecki as a private in 1937
- Born: 5 June 1915; Kumiałka
- Died: 7 September 1939 (aged 24); Nowe Grabie
- Military career
- Allegiance: Polish Armed Forces
- Branch: Air Force
- Service years: 1937–1939
- Rank: Corporal Pilot
- Units: Polish Air Force; 51st Reconnaissance Squadron; 55th Independent Bomber Squadron
- Commands: Pilot
- Conflicts: World War II: Invasion of Poland
- Awards: Cross of Valour, Cross of Merit

Stanisław Zarzecki (born 5 June 1915 in Kumiałka, died 7 September 1939 near Nowe Grabie) was a corporal pilot of the Polish Armed Forces, a participant in the Invasion of Poland. He perished during a combat mission piloting a PZL.23 Karaś aircraft. He was awarded the Bronze Cross of Merit in 1938 and the Cross of Valour posthumously in 1947.

== Biography ==
Stanisław Zarzecki was born on 5 June 1915 in Kumiałka near Janów. He was the son of Antoni and Zofia (née Ostapowicz). He completed four grades at a primary school in Rudawka and three grades in Janów. He continued his education in Vilnius, graduating from the three-year State Vocational and Industrial School. There, as part of the Aviation Military Training, he completed glider training and initial aircraft pilot training at a glider aerodrome in nearby Auksztagiry.

=== Peacetime military service ===
Due to his participation in the pilot training course, Zarzecki was called up for military service in the 5th Air Regiment only after its completion, arriving in Lida on 2 January 1937. From 3 January to 10 April, he trained at the regimental Aircraft Maintenance School, then joined the Pilot Training Squadron within the 5th Air Regiment's Training Squadron. He completed the advanced phase of military pilot training on Potez 25 and PWS-18 aircraft between August and September 1937. On 15 September 1937, he was promoted to private first class. He then completed a two-month advanced pilot training course at the Aviation School of Gunnery and Bombing in Grudziądz and was assigned to the 51st Reconnaissance Squadron, recently equipped with new PZL.23 Karaś reconnaissance-bomber aircraft. On 19 March 1938, Stanisław Zarzecki was promoted to corporal.

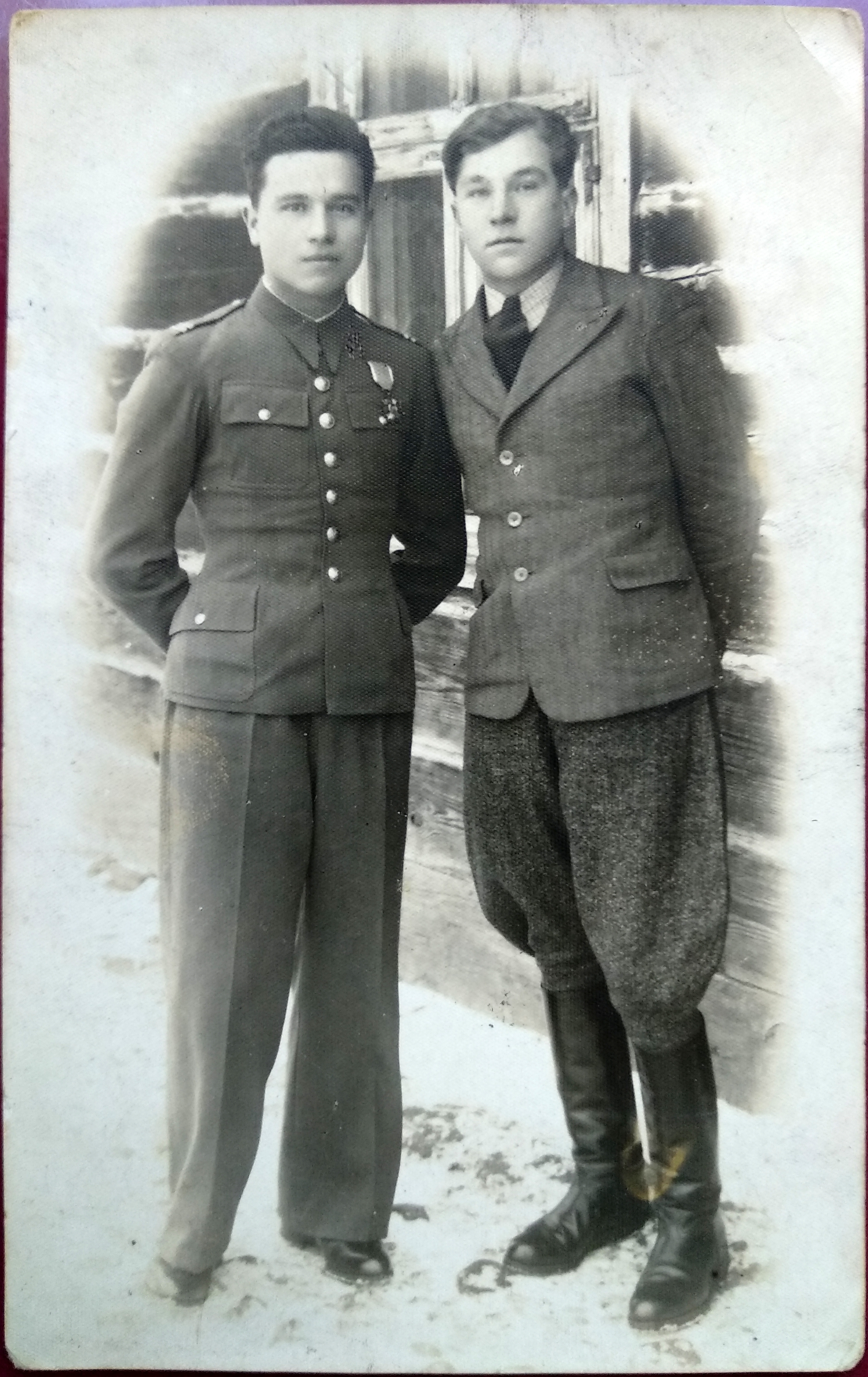
Stanisław Zarzecki (left) with the Bronze Cross of Merit on his chest

On 5 May 1938, during a group flight, two PZL.23 Karaś aircraft (one piloted by Corporal Stanisław Zarzecki and Corporal Ferdynand Micel, the other by Corporal Marian Wasiak and Second Lieutenant Observer Hieronim Kulbacki) collided wingtips. (Note: Szymanowski (2015, p. 15) and Rogusz (2012, p. 83) state that the collision occurred on 8 May 1938.) Despite the damage, both crews safely landed their aircraft, saving themselves and the valuable machines. For this, all four airmen were awarded the Bronze Cross of Merit on 8 July 1938 by decision of Prime Minister Felicjan Sławoj Składkowski. (Note: Pawlak (1989, p. 328) and Rogusz (2012, pp. 74, 83) state that the awards were presented in September 1938.) On 20 November 1938, Corporal Zarzecki was transferred to the 55th Independent Bomber Squadron of the 5th Air Regiment.

=== Mobilization and the invasion of Poland ===
As part of the mobilization announced on 23 August 1939, 55th Independent Bomber Squadron was assigned to the Bomber Brigade. Initially, the airmen were stationed on alert at their home base in Lida, but on 31 August, between 11:00 AM and 2:00 PM, they flew to an airstrip in Marynin, located 3 km southeast of Radzyń Podlaski. The squadron's ground transport arrived at the airstrip on 1 September at 5:00 AM, after the outbreak of hostilities.

During the first two days of the war, the 55th Independent Bomber Squadron did not engage in combat due to a lack of orders. On the morning of 3 September, orders from the Bomber Brigade headquarters directed the squadron to conduct reconnaissance and then bomb a large German armored unit near Radomsko and Częstochowa. The Karaś crew, consisting of Second Lieutenant Observer Stanisław Pytlakowski, Corporal Pilot Stanisław Zarzecki, and Private Air Gunner Antoni Iwaniuk, took off as part of the third and final three-aircraft flight from the 55th Squadron that day, successfully bombing an enemy armored column moving south of Radomsko and returning safely to the airstrip.

The second combat mission of the Karaś piloted by Zarzecki took place on 7 September, after receiving orders in the afternoon to conduct reconnaissance of enemy forces between Łódź and Częstochowa, deliver a weighted report to Warsaw, and then continue reconnaissance on the northern front. The aircraft, which took off from Marynin between 2:00 PM and 3:00 PM, successfully completed the first part of the mission, dropping the report in front of the Ministry of Military Affairs at 6 Sierpnia Street in Warsaw (the report reached the Bomber Brigade commander, Colonel Władysław Eugeniusz Heller). During the second part of the mission, the PZL.23 was shot down by Messerschmitt Bf 109 fighters over Nowe Grabie, and the entire crew perished. According to eyewitness accounts, none of the airmen attempted to escape the burning aircraft by parachute, suggesting they were killed or severely wounded during the German fighter attack.

In 1947, by order of the Commander-in-Chief of the Polish Armed Forces in the West, Corporal Pilot Stanisław Zarzecki was posthumously awarded the Cross of Valour.

== Commemoration ==
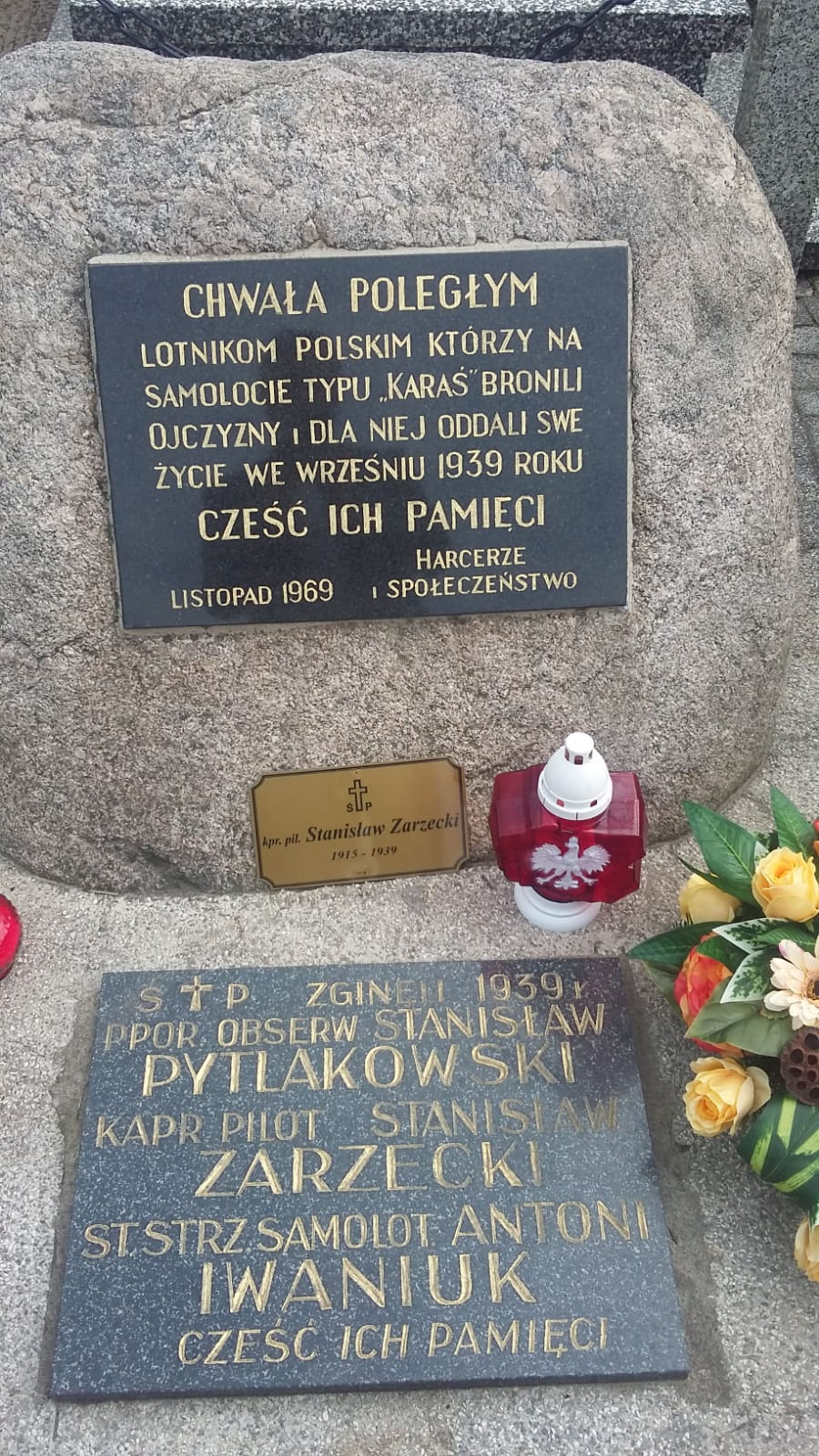
Plaques at the grave of the fallen airmen

The fallen airmen were initially buried in an unmarked grave approximately 100 meters from the crash site. Between 1939 and 1941, their remains were transferred to the parish cemetery in Poświętne. A cross was erected at the grave with a plaque reading: "Here rest the airmen who died fighting for Polish soil". In the 1960s, Czesław Adamiuk, a teacher and leader of the 57th Polish Scouting and Guiding Association troop named after Janek Krasicki in Poświętne, initiated the "Płyta" campaign to restore the grave and identify the buried airmen. In November 1969, a 2.5-ton stone, funded by the monument construction committee, was placed at the grave. At the time, the airmen's identities were unknown (confirmed only in 1977 through historian Adam Popiel's efforts), so the plaque read: "Glory to the fallen Polish airmen who, on a ‘Karaś' aircraft, defended the Homeland and gave their lives for it in September 1939. Scouts and the community". After the identities were established, Bolesław Kowalski, a stonemason from Kobyłka, crafted a new plaque with the airmen's names and refurbished the grave. Annual patriotic ceremonies at the grave of the September 1939 soldiers have since gathered schoolchildren and local residents.

In April 2014, members of the Wizna 1939 Association, led by president Dariusz Szymanowski, began efforts to locate the Karaś crash site and recover aircraft parts buried in the ground. After discovering aircraft fragments, resumed searches on 25 May included a television crew from the program Było, nie minęło with editor Adam Sikorski, youth from the Wołomin branch of the Riflemen's Association, and local volunteers and history enthusiasts.

On 7 July 2014, researchers found a box at a depth of about 1 meter containing human remains wrapped in a parachute. During the exhumation, they recovered fragments of a uniform, a pilot's cap, a tie, charred buttons, and a medallion with the image of the Black Madonna of Częstochowa, indicating the burial of a Karaś crew member. However, the parish cemetery in Poświętne already contained a grave for three airmen killed in the 1939 crash. Interviews with the oldest local residents revealed that only two airmen were buried in Poświętne during the war. The identity of the exhumed remains was confirmed by shoulder insignia on a uniform with traces of two bars, uniquely identifying Corporal Stanisław Zarzecki, the only crew member with the rank of corporal.

=== Reburial ===
With support from the Mazovian Voivode's services, a funeral ceremony was held on 21 September 2014. The ceremony began at noon with a Mass in memory of the crew at the Field Cathedral of the Polish Army in Warsaw, followed by the reburial of Corporal Pilot Stanisław Zarzecki's remains at 3:00 PM in the common grave of the Karaś crew in Poświętne. The event drew hundreds of attendees, including the pilot's family, Polish Armed Forces representatives, the Office for War Veterans and Victims of Oppression, the Institute of National Remembrance, local authorities, historical reenactment groups, veterans, schools, and community organizations. Participants included a representative of the Podlaskie Voivodeship, members of the 23rd Air Base from Mińsk Mazowiecki, the Wizna 1939 Association, and the Było, nie minęło program team. The pilot's remains were buried with honors, accompanied by standard-bearers and a salvo from the Polish Army Honour Guard Company, followed by an aircraft flyover above the cemetery.

Annual commemorative ceremonies are held in May at the Poświętne cemetery (e.g., 14 May 2017 and 13 May 2018). In 2019, the ceremony took place on 12 May, featuring a field Mass, speeches, an Appeal for the Fallen, and wreath-laying at the airmen's grave. Additional attractions included air shows by the AT3 Formation, Extra EA-300 and Piper J-3 Cub aircraft, an autogyro, and an ultralight trike.

== Bibliography ==
- Szymanowski, Dariusz, ed. (2014). "Karaś" nad Wołominem ["Karaś" over Wołomin] (in Polish). Wołomin: Wizna 1939. ISBN 978-83-931959-3-0.
- Pawlak, Jerzy (1989). Polskie eskadry w latach 1918–1939 [Polish Squadrons in the Years 1918–1939] (in Polish). Warsaw: Wydawnictwa Komunikacji i Łączności. ISBN 83-206-0760-4.
- Pawlak, Jerzy (1991). Polskie eskadry w wojnie obronnej 1939 [Polish Squadrons in the Defensive War of 1939] (in Polish). Warsaw: Wydawnictwa Komunikacji i Łączności. ISBN 8320607957.
- Rogusz, Marek (2012). "Tragedia "Karasia" z tygrysiej eskadry" [The Tragedy of the "Karaś" from the Tiger Squadron]. Rocznik Wołomiński (in Polish). VIII. Wołomin: Urząd Miejski w Wołominie. ISSN 1734-7815.
- Szymanowski, Dariusz, ed. (2015). Tragedia "Karasia" z 55 eskadry pod Wołominem [The Tragedy of the "Karaś" from the 55th Squadron near Wołomin] (in Polish). Wołomin: Wizna 1939. ISBN 978-83-931959-5-4.
