= Denisovka, Russia =

Denisovka (Russian: Денисовка) is the name of several rural localities in Russia.

== Modern localities ==
- Denisovka, Dyatkovsky District, Bryansk Oblast, a village in Slobodishchensky Selsoviet of Dyatkovsky District of Bryansk Oblast
- Denisovka, Suzemsky District, Bryansk Oblast, a selo in Denisovsky Selsoviet of Suzemsky District of Bryansk Oblast
- Denisovka, Kemerovo Oblast, a village in Padunskaya Rural Territory of Promyshlennovsky District of Kemerovo Oblast
- Denisovka, Komi Republic, a village in Mutny Materik Selo Administrative Territory of the town of republic significance of Usinsk in the Komi Republic
- Denisovka, Krasnoyarsk Krai, a village in Ustyansky Selsoviet of Abansky District of Krasnoyarsk Krai
- Denisovka, Medvensky District, Kursk Oblast, a village in Kitayevsky Selsoviet of Medvensky District of Kursk Oblast
- Denisovka, Shchigrovsky District, Kursk Oblast, a village in Troitskokrasnyansky Selsoviet of Shchigrovsky District of Kursk Oblast
- Denisovka, Lipetsk Oblast, a selo in Urusovsky Selsoviet of Chaplyginsky District of Lipetsk Oblast
- Denisovka, Mari El Republic, a village in Maryinsky Rural Okrug of Yurinsky District of the Mari El Republic
- Denisovka, Omsk Oblast, a village in Sedelnikovsky Rural Okrug of Sedelnikovsky District of Omsk Oblast
- Denisovka, Kolpnyansky District, Oryol Oblast, a village in Akhtyrsky Selsoviet of Kolpnyansky District of Oryol Oblast
- Denisovka, Pokrovsky District, Oryol Oblast, a village in Verkhnezhernovsky Selsoviet of Pokrovsky District of Oryol Oblast
- Denisovka, Perm Krai, a village in Vereshchaginsky District of Perm Krai
- Denisovka, Pskov Oblast, a village in Kunyinsky District of Pskov Oblast
- Denisovka, Rostov Oblast, a khutor in Ryazhenskoye Rural Settlement of Matveyevo-Kurgansky District of Rostov Oblast
- Denisovka, Monastyrshchinsky District, Smolensk Oblast, a village in Novomikhaylovskoye Rural Settlement of Monastyrshchinsky District of Smolensk Oblast
- Denisovka, Roslavlsky District, Smolensk Oblast, a village in Syrokorenskoye Rural Settlement of Roslavlsky District of Smolensk Oblast
- Denisovka, Vladimir Oblast, a village in Kovrovsky District of Vladimir Oblast
- Denisovka, Voronezh Oblast, a settlement in Mosolovskoye Rural Settlement of Anninsky District of Voronezh Oblast

== Renamed localities ==
- Denisovka, former name of Lomonosovo, a selo in Kholmogorsky District of Arkhangelsk Oblast
