= 2nd Nikolskoye (disambiguation) =

2nd Nikolskoye (Russian: 2-е Никольское) is a selo in Voronezh Oblast, Russia.

2nd Nikolskoye may also refer to:

- 2nd Nikolskoye, Medvensky District, Kursk Oblast, a village in Russia

== See also ==
- Nikolskoye 2-ye
- Nikolsky (inhabited locality)
