= Lubyanka (populated place) =

Lubyanka (Russian: Лубянка, Belarusian: Лубянка) may refer to the following localities in Belarus and Russia:

== Belarus ==
- Lubyanka, Gomel Oblast, a village
- Lubyanka, Smarhon' District, Grodno Oblast, a village
- Lubyanka, Svislach District, Grodno Oblast, a village
- Lubyanka, Bykhaw District, Mogilev Oblast, a village
- Lubyanka, Klimavichy District, Mogilev Oblast, a village

== Russia ==
- Lubyanka, Kaloega Oblast, a village
- Lubyanka, Kursk Oblast, a village
- Lubyanka, Orjol Oblast, a village
- Lubyanka, Perm Krai, a village
- Lubyanka, Primorsky Krai, a village
- Lubyanka, Mikhaylovsky District, Ryazan Oblast, a village
- Lubyanka, Miloslavsky District, Ryazan Oblast, a village
- Lubyanka, Sverdlovsk Oblast, a settlement
- Lubyanka, Tula Oblast, a village

== See also ==
- Łubianka (disambiguation)
- Lubianka (disambiguation)
