= Barybin =

Barybin (Russian: Барыбин) is a Russian surname. Notable people with the surname include:

- Olexandr Mykolayovych Barybin (born 1951), a Ukrainian politician
- Andriy Mykolayovych Barybin (born 1965), a Soviet and Ukrainian Paralympian
- Konstantin Sergeyevich Barybin (1908–1994), a Soviet and Russian mathematician and educator

Also

- Barybin, Kursk Oblast, a khoetor in Medvensky District of Kursk Oblast
