= Denisovka =

Denisovka may refer to:

- Denisovka, Kazakhstan, a settlement in Kostanay Region of Kazakhstan
- Denisovka, Russia, name of several rural localities in Russia
- the former name of Birdik, Ysyk-Ata, a village in Chuy Region of Kyrgyzstan
