= Shumovka =

Shumovka (Russian: Шумовка), rural localities in Russia, may refer to:

- Shumovka, Kostroma Oblast, a locality (rus. kordon)
- Shumovka, Kursk Oblast, a village
- Shumovka (settlement), Smolensk Oblast, a settlement
- Shumovka (village), Smolensk Oblast, a village
- Shumovka, Uljanovsk Oblast, a selo
