= Lubyanka =

Lubyanka may refer to:

- Lubyanka Square, Moscow
- Lubyanka Building, former KGB headquarters at Lubyanka Square, Moscow
  - Lubyanka Prison within the building
  - Metonymically, the Soviet and Russian security services (NKVD, KGB, FSB, etc.)
- Bolshaya Lubyanka Street, Moscow
- Malaya Lubyanka Street, Moscow
- Lubyanka (Metro), a metro station in Moscow
- Lubyanka (populated place), a number of rural localities in Belarus and Russia

== See also ==
- Lubianka (disambiguation)
- Łubianka (disambiguation)
