= Nowowola =

- Village
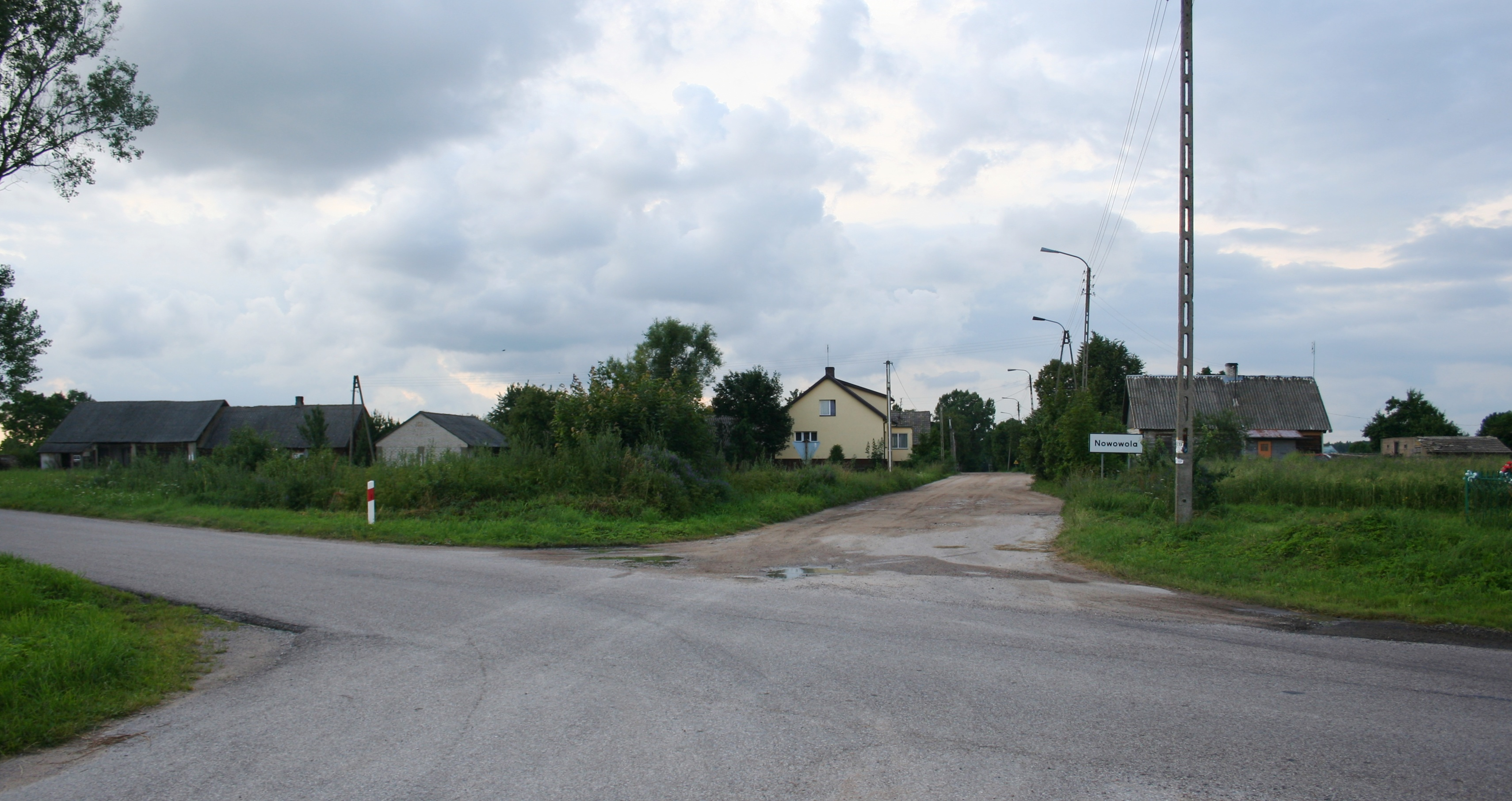

- Location within Poland
- Coordinates: 53°29′N 23°24′E
- Country: Poland
- Voivodeship: Podlaskie
- County: Sokółka
- Gmina: Janów

Nowowola [nɔvɔˈvɔla] is a village in the administrative district of Gmina Janów, within Sokółka County, Podlaskie Voivodeship, in north-eastern Poland.
