= Teolin, Podlaskie Voivodeship =

Teolin
- Village
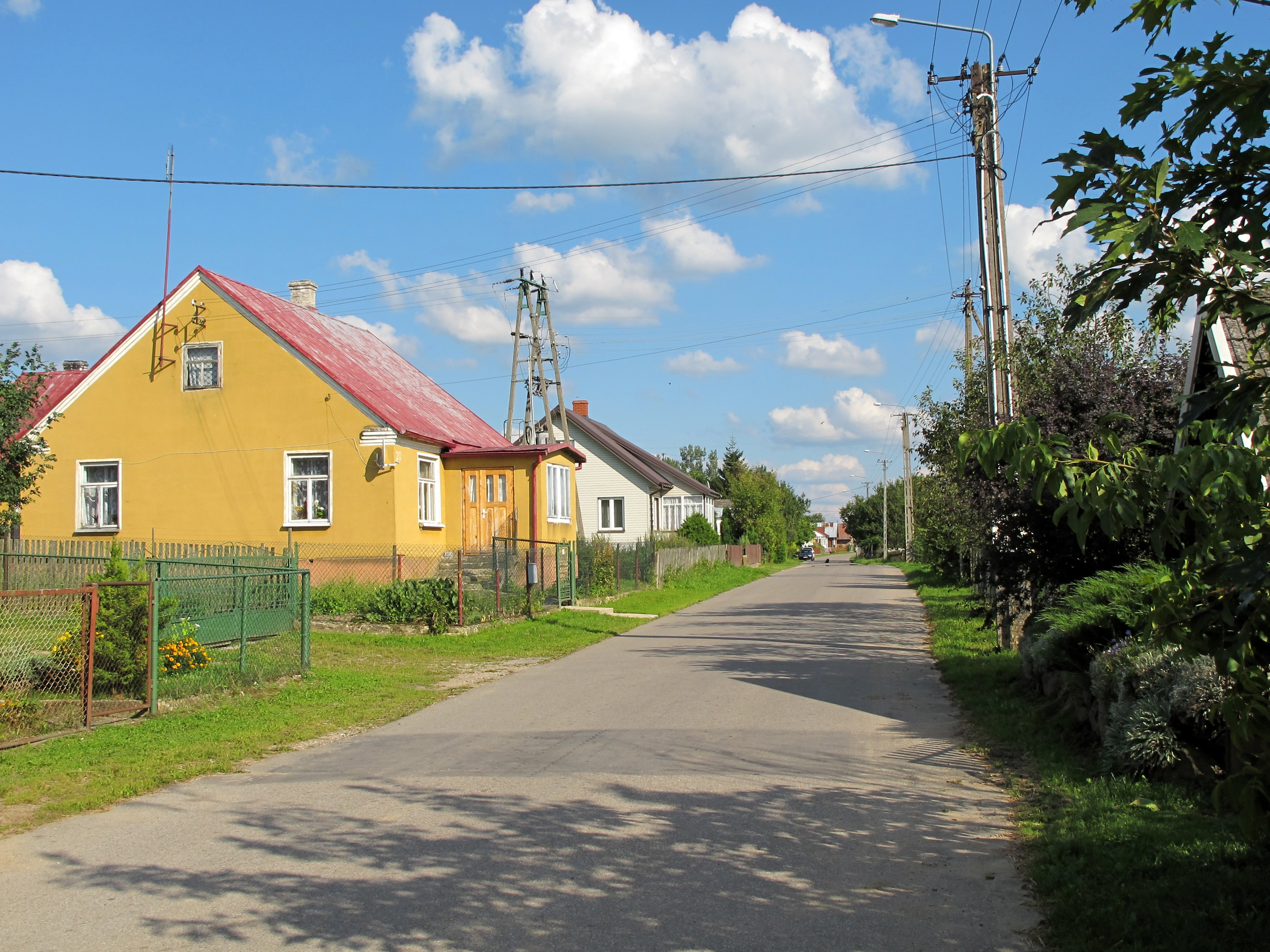

- Location within Poland
- Coordinates: 53°25′47″N 23°13′51″E
- Country: Poland
- Voivodeship: Podlaskie
- County: Sokółka
- Gmina: Janów
- Population: 190

Teolin [tɛˈɔlin] is a village in the administrative district of Gmina Janów, within Sokółka County, Podlaskie Voivodeship, in north-eastern Poland.
