= Cieśnisk Mały =

- Village
- Location within Poland
- Coordinates: 53°30′42″N 23°17′0″E
- Country: Poland
- Voivodeship: Podlaskie
- County: Sokółka
- Gmina: Janów
- Population: 100

Cieśnisk Mały (Polish pronunciation: [ˈtɕɛɕɲisk ˈmawɨ]) is a village in the administrative district of Gmina Janów, within Sokółka County, Podlaskie Voivodeship, in north-eastern Poland.
