= Łubianka =

Łubianka, rural localities in Poland, may refer to:

- Łubianka, Greater Poland Voivodeship (central Poland)
- Łubianka, Kuyavian-Pomeranian Voivodeship (north-central Poland)
- Łubianka, Masovian Voivodeship (east-central Poland)
- Łubianka, Augustów County, in Podlaskie Voivodeship (north-east Poland)
- Łubianka, Sokółka County, in Podlaskie Voivodeship (north-east Poland)
- Łubianka, Pomeranian Voivodeship (north Poland)
- Łubianka, West Pomeranian Voivodeship (north-west Poland)

== See also ==
- Lubianka (disambiguation)
- Lubyanka (disambiguation)
