= Nowy Janów, Podlaskie Voivodeship =

Nowy Janów
- Village
- Location within Poland
- Coordinates: 53°28′N 23°14′E
- Country: Poland
- Voivodeship: Podlaskie
- County: Sokółka
- Gmina: Janów

Nowy Janów [ˈnɔvɨ ˈjanuf] is a village in the administrative district of Gmina Janów, within Sokółka County, Podlaskie Voivodeship, in north-eastern Poland.
