= Studzieńczyna =

Village in Gmina Janów, Poland

- Village
- Location within Poland
- Coordinates: 53°30′29″N 23°17′09″E
- Country: Poland
- Voivodeship: Podlaskie
- County: Sokółka
- Gmina: Janów

Studzieńczyna [stud͡ʑɛɲˈt͡ʂɨna] is a village in the administrative district of Gmina Janów, within Sokółka County, Podlaskie Voivodeship, in north-eastern Poland.
