= Cieśnisk Wielki =

- Village
- Location within Poland
- Coordinates: 53°32′N 23°16′E
- Country: Poland
- Voivodeship: Podlaskie
- County: Sokółka
- Gmina: Janów

Cieśnisk Wielki (Polish pronunciation: [ˈtɕɛɕɲisk ˈfjɛlkʲi]) is a village in the administrative district of Gmina Janów, within Sokółka County, Podlaskie Voivodeship, in north-eastern Poland.
