= Sosnowe Bagno =

- Village
- Location within Poland
- Coordinates: 53°24′48″N 23°16′51″E
- Country: Poland
- Voivodeship: Podlaskie
- County: Sokółka
- Gmina: Janów

Sosnowe Bagno [sɔsˈnɔvɛ ˈbaɡnɔ] is a village in the administrative district of Gmina Janów, within Sokółka County, Podlaskie Voivodeship, in north-eastern Poland.
