= Szczuki, Podlaskie Voivodeship =

Szczuki
- Village
- Location within Poland
- Coordinates: 53°31′N 23°13′E
- Country: Poland
- Voivodeship: Podlaskie
- County: Sokółka
- Gmina: Janów

Szczuki [ˈʂt͡ʂuki] is a village in the administrative district of Gmina Janów, within Sokółka County, Podlaskie Voivodeship, in north-eastern Poland.
