= Białousy =

- Village
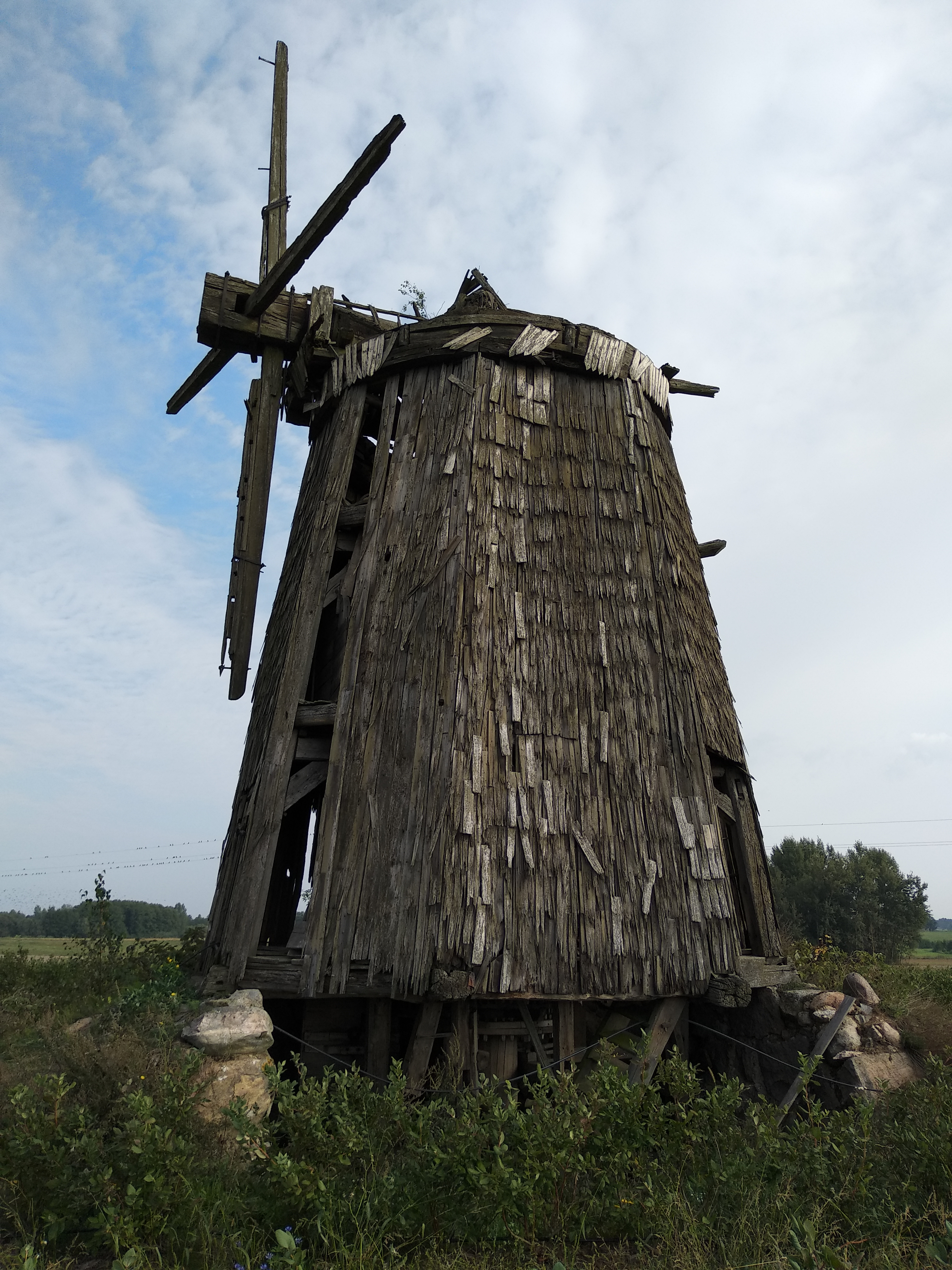
- A windmill in Białousy

- Location within Poland
- Coordinates: 53°25′N 23°14′E
- Country: Poland
- Voivodeship: Podlaskie
- County: Sokółka
- Gmina: Janów
- Population (2011): 249

Białousy [bjawɔˈusɨ] is a village in the administrative district of Gmina Janów, within Sokółka County, Podlaskie Voivodeship, in north-eastern Poland.

The name of the village was first mentioned in 1709 as Wólka Białousów in a church certificate. The name comes from the surname of the family who first came to the area.

== Notable landmarks ==
- A wooden windmill, made in 1880, registration number 431 from March 20, 1979.
