= Kamienica, Podlaskie Voivodeship =

Kamienica
- Village
- Location within Poland
- Coordinates: 53°29′25″N 23°15′54″E
- Country: Poland
- Voivodeship: Podlaskie
- County: Sokółka
- Gmina: Janów
- Population: 200

Kamienica [kamjɛˈnit͡sa] is a village in the administrative district of Gmina Janów, within Sokółka County, Podlaskie Voivodeship, in north-eastern Poland.
