= Gabrylewszczyzna =

- Village
- Location within Poland
- Coordinates: 53°30′21″N 23°15′24″E
- Country: Poland
- Voivodeship: Podlaskie
- County: Sokółka
- Gmina: Janów

Gabrylewszczyzna [ɡabrɨlɛfʂˈt͡ʂɨzna] is a village in the administrative district of Gmina Janów, within Sokółka County, Podlaskie Voivodeship, in north-eastern Poland.
