= Krasne, Sokółka County =

Krasne
- Village
- Location within Poland
- Coordinates: 53°30′30″N 23°17′12″E
- Country: Poland
- Voivodeship: Podlaskie
- County: Sokółka
- Gmina: Janów

Krasne [ˈkrasnɛ] is a village in the administrative district of Gmina Janów, within Sokółka County, Podlaskie Voivodeship, in north-eastern Poland.
