= Gmina Janów, Podlaskie Voivodeship =

Gmina Janów Janów Commune
- Gmina
- Coat of arms

- Gmina Janów within the Sokółka County
- Coordinates (Janów): 53°28′N 23°13′E
- Country: Poland
- Voivodeship: Podlaskie
- County: Sokółka
- Seat: Janów

Area
  - Total: 207.84 km^{2} (80.25 sq mi)

Population (2006)
  - Total: 4,427
  - Density: 21.30/km^{2} (55.17/sq mi)

Gmina Janów is a rural gmina (administrative district) in Sokółka County, Podlaskie Voivodeship, in north-eastern Poland. Its seat is the village of Janów, which lies approximately 21 kilometres (13 mi) west of Sokółka and 39 km (24 mi) north of the regional capital Białystok.

The gmina covers an area of 207.84 square kilometres (80.2 sq mi), and as of 2006 its total population is 4,427.

The gmina contains part of the protected area called Knyszyń Forest Landscape Park.

== History ==
Since 13th age to 1795 Gmina Janów was part of Grand Duchy of Lithuania.

== Population ==
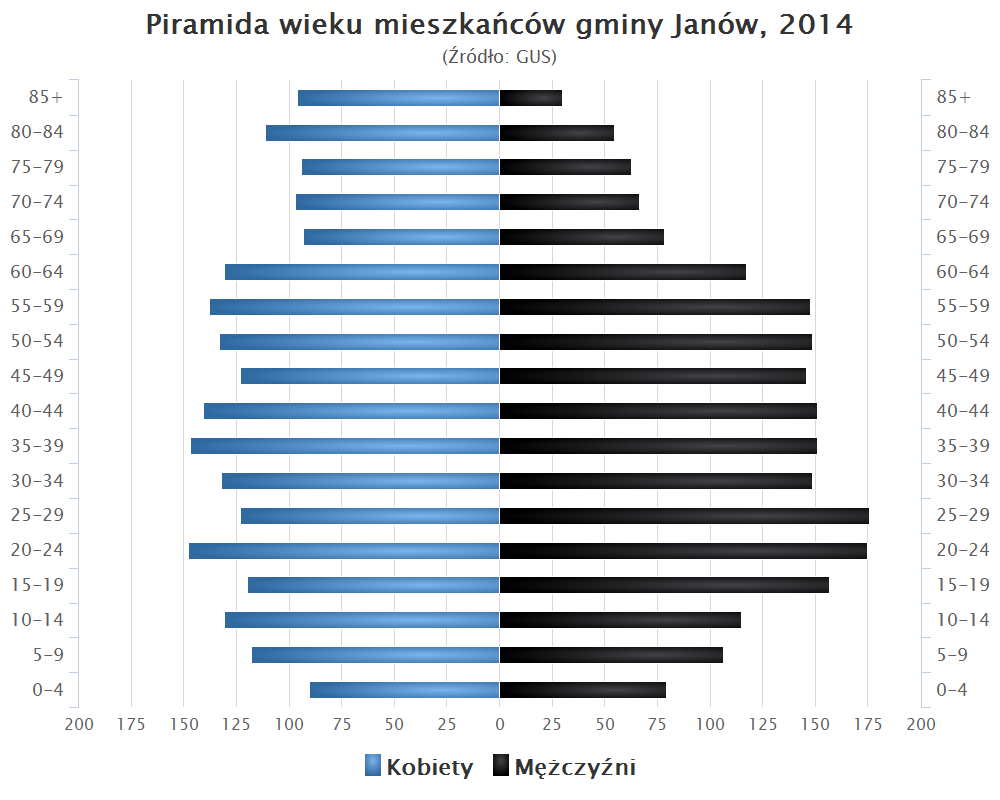
Population pyramid of the Janow gmina, 2014

== Villages ==
Gmina Janów contains the villages and settlements of Białousy, Brzozowe Błoto, Budno, Budzisk-Bagno, Budzisk-Strużka, Chorążycha, Cieśnisk Mały, Cieśnisk Wielki, Cimoszka, Dąbrówka, Franckowa Buda, Gabrylewszczyzna, Giełozicha, Janów, Jasionowa Dolina, Kamienica, Kizielany, Kizielewszczyzna, Kładziewo, Krasne, Kumiałka, Kuplisk, Kwasówka, Łubianka, Marchelówka, Nowokolno, Nowowola, Nowy Janów, Ostrynka, Podbudno, Podłubianka, Podtrzcianka, Przystawka, Rudawka, Sitawka, Sitkowo, Skidlewo, Soroczy Mostek, Sosnowe Bagno, Studzieńczyna, Szczuki, Teolin, Trofimówka, Trzcianka, Wasilówka and Zielony Gaj.

== Neighbouring gminas ==
Gmina Janów is bordered by the gminas of Czarna Białostocka, Dąbrowa Białostocka, Korycin, Sidra, Sokółka and Suchowola.
