= Trzcianka, Sokółka County =

Trzcianka
- Village
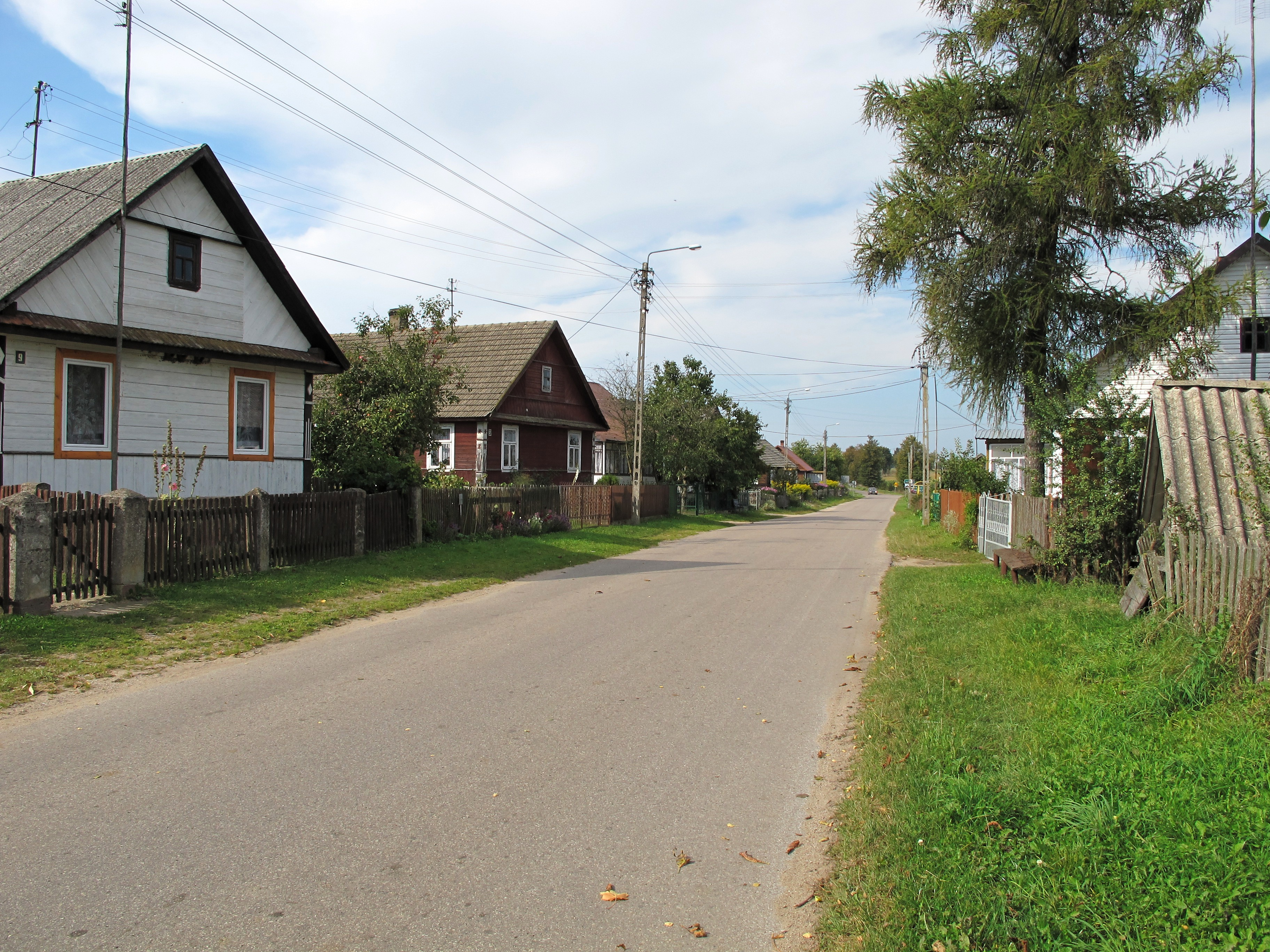

- Location within Poland
- Coordinates: 53°28′9″N 23°21′15″E
- Country: Poland
- Voivodeship: Podlaskie
- County: Sokółka
- Gmina: Janów

Trzcianka [ˈtʂt͡ɕaŋka] is a village in the administrative district of Gmina Janów, within Sokółka County, Podlaskie Voivodeship, in north-eastern Poland.
