= Kwasówka, Podlaskie Voivodeship =

Kwasówka
- Settlement
- Location within Poland
- Coordinates: 53°23′23″N 23°13′58″E
- Country: Poland
- Voivodeship: Podlaskie
- County: Sokółka
- Gmina: Janów

Kwasówka [kfaˈsufka] is a settlement in the administrative district of Gmina Janów, within Sokółka County, Podlaskie Voivodeship, in north-eastern Poland.
