= Zielony Gaj, Sokółka County =

Zielony Gaj
- Village
- Location within Poland
- Coordinates: 53°31′13″N 23°16′10″E
- Country: Poland
- Voivodeship: Podlaskie
- County: Sokółka
- Gmina: Janów
- Elevation: 150 m (490 ft)

Zielony Gaj (Polish pronunciation: [ʑɛˈlɔnɨ ˈɡaj]; until 1950: Karlsdorf) is a village in the administrative district of Gmina Janów, within Sokółka County, Podlaskie Voivodeship, in north-eastern Poland.
