= Budzisk-Strużka =

Settlement in Gmina Janów, Poland

- Settlement
- Location within Poland
- Coordinates: 53°30′20″N 23°17′00″E
- Country: Poland
- Voivodeship: Podlaskie
- County: Sokółka
- Gmina: Janów

Budzisk-Strużka [ˈbud͡ʑisk ˈstruʂka] is a settlement in the administrative district of Gmina Janów, within Sokółka County, Podlaskie Voivodeship, in north-eastern Poland.
