= Kładziewo =

- Settlement
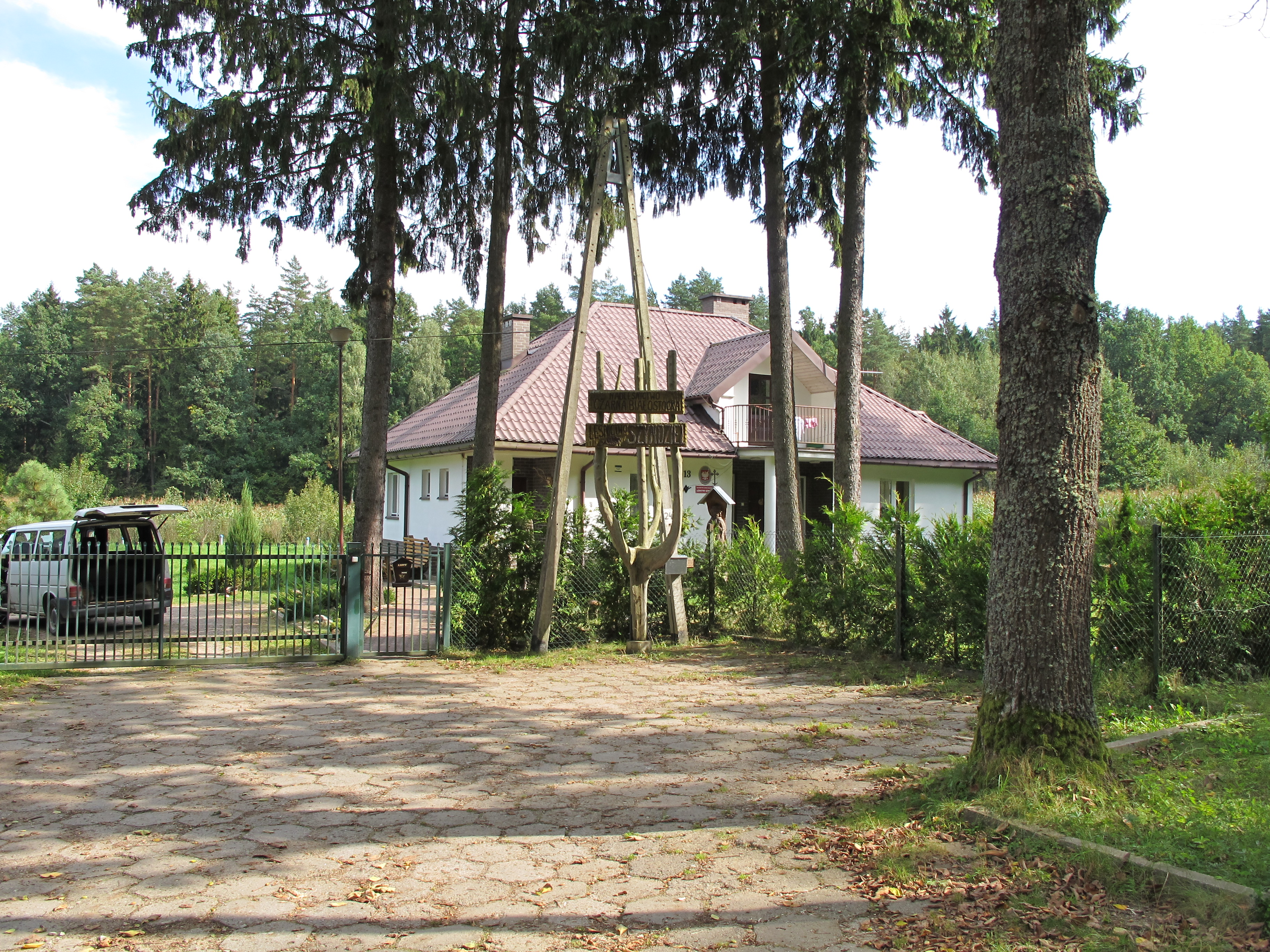

- Location within Poland
- Coordinates: 53°27′15″N 23°21′38″E
- Country: Poland
- Voivodeship: Podlaskie
- County: Sokółka
- Gmina: Janów

Kładziewo [kwaˈd͡ʑɛvɔ] is a settlement in the administrative district of Gmina Janów, within Sokółka County, Podlaskie Voivodeship, in north-eastern Poland.
