= Wasilówka, Sokółka County =

Wasilówka
- Village
- Location within Poland
- Coordinates: 53°28′N 23°17′E
- Country: Poland
- Voivodeship: Podlaskie
- County: Sokółka
- Gmina: Janów

Wasilówka [vaɕiˈlufka] is a village in the administrative district of Gmina Janów, within Sokółka County, Podlaskie Voivodeship, in north-eastern Poland.
