= Jasionowa Dolina =

- Village
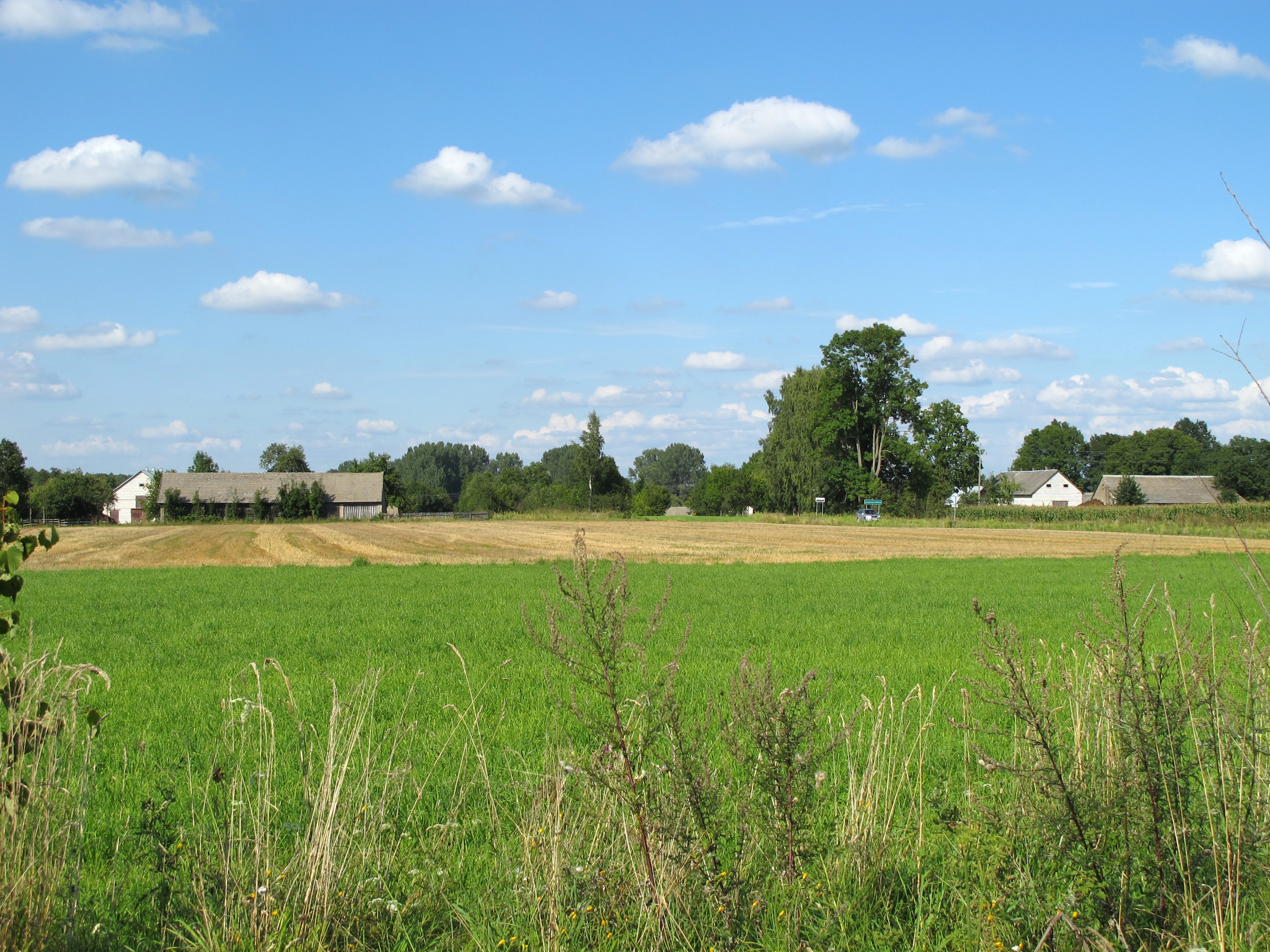

- Location within Poland
- Coordinates: 53°29′N 23°12′E
- Country: Poland
- Voivodeship: Podlaskie
- County: Sokółka
- Gmina: Janów

Jasionowa Dolina [jaɕɔˈnɔva dɔˈlina] is a village in the administrative district of Gmina Janów, within Sokółka County, Podlaskie Voivodeship, in north-eastern Poland.
