= Brzozowe Błoto =

- Village
- Location within Poland
- Coordinates: 53°23′38″N 23°14′28″E
- Country: Poland
- Voivodeship: Podlaskie
- County: Sokółka
- Gmina: Janów

Brzozowe Błoto [bʐɔˈzɔvɛ ˈbwɔtɔ] is a village in the administrative district of Gmina Janów, within Sokółka County, Podlaskie Voivodeship, in north-eastern Poland.
