= Chorążycha =

- Village
- Location within Poland
- Coordinates: 53°27′49″N 23°13′44″E
- Country: Poland
- Voivodeship: Podlaskie
- County: Sokółka
- Gmina: Janów

Chorążycha [xɔrɔ̃ˈʐɨxa] is a village in the administrative district of Gmina Janów, within Sokółka County, Podlaskie Voivodeship, in north-eastern Poland.
