= Podłubianka =

Village in Gmina Janów, Poland

- Village
- Location within Poland
- Coordinates: 53°30′53″N 23°17′35″E
- Country: Poland
- Voivodeship: Podlaskie
- County: Sokółka
- Gmina: Janów

Podłubianka [pɔdwuˈbjaŋka] is a village in the administrative district of Gmina Janów, within Sokółka County, Podlaskie Voivodeship, in north-eastern Poland.
