= Dąbrówka, Gmina Janów =

Dąbrówka
- Settlement
- Location within Poland
- Coordinates: 53°27′13″N 23°22′41″E
- Country: Poland
- Voivodeship: Podlaskie
- County: Sokółka
- Gmina: Janów

Dąbrówka [dɔmˈbrufka] is a settlement in the administrative district of Gmina Janów, within Sokółka County, Podlaskie Voivodeship, in north-eastern Poland.
