= Nikolskoye 2-ye =

Nikolskoye 2-ye Никольское 2-е
- Selo
- Location within Voronezh Oblast Location within Russia
- Coordinates: 50°36′N 41°09′E
- Country: Russia
- Region: Voronezh Oblast
- District: Vorobyovsky District
- Time zone: UTC+3:00

Nikolskoye 2-ye (Russian: Никольское 2-е) is a rural locality (a selo) in Nikolskoye 1-ye Rural Settlement, Vorobyovsky District, Voronezh Oblast, Russia. The population was 583 as of 2010. There are 13 streets.

== Geography ==
Nikolskoye 2-ye is located 21 km southeast of Vorobyovka (the district's administrative centre) by road. Nikolskoye 1-ye is the nearest rural locality.
