= Denisovka, Vladimir Oblast =

Denisovka Денисовка
- Village
- Location within Vladimir Oblast Location within Russia
- Coordinates: 56°06′N 41°32′E
- Country: Russia
- Region: Vladimir Oblast
- District: Kovrovsky District
- Time zone: UTC+3:00

Denisovka (Russian: Денисовка) is a rural locality (a village) in Ivanovskoye Rural Settlement, Kovrovsky District, Vladimir Oblast, Russia. The population was 33 as of 2010.

== Geography ==
Denisovka is located 34 km south of Kovrov (the district's administrative centre) by road. Voskhod is the nearest rural locality.
