= Denisovka, Perm Krai =

Denisovka Денисовка
- Village
- Location within Perm Krai Location within Russia
- Coordinates: 58°02′N 54°24′E
- Country: Russia
- Region: Perm Krai
- District: Vereshchaginsky District
- Time zone: UTC+5:00

Denisovka (Russian: Денисовка) is a rural locality (a village) in Vereshchaginsky District, Perm Krai, Russia. The population was 16 as of 2010.

== Geography ==
Denisovka is located 19 km west of Vereshchagino (the district's administrative centre) by road. Zapolye is the nearest rural locality.
