= 2nd Nikolskoye =

2nd Nikolskoye 2-е Никольское
- Selo
- Location within Voronezh Oblast Location within Russia
- Coordinates: 51.125°N 39.816389°E
- Country: Russia
- Region: Voronezh Oblast
- District: Bobrovsky District
- Time zone: UTC+03:00

2nd Nikolskoye (Russian: 2-е Никольское) is a rural locality (a selo) and the administrative center of Nikolaskoye Rural Settlement of Bobrovsky District, Russia. The population was 675 as of 2010.

== Streets ==
- Belyachki
- Mira
- Molodezhnaya
- Sovetskaya
- Shkolnaya

== Geography ==
2nd Nikolskoye is located 24 km west of Bobrov (the district's administrative centre) by road. Razdolny is the nearest rural locality.
