= Denisovka, Voronezh Oblast =

Denisovka Денисовка
- Settlement
- Location within Voronezh Oblast Location within Russia
- Coordinates: 51°36′N 40°25′E
- Country: Russia
- Region: Voronezh Oblast
- District: Anninsky District
- Time zone: UTC+3:00

Denisovka (Russian: Денисовка) is a rural locality (a settlement) in Mosolovskoye Rural Settlement, Anninsky District, Voronezh Oblast, Russia. The population was 1 as of 2010.

== Geography ==
Denisovka is located 16 km north of Anna (the district's administrative centre) by road. Mikhaylovka 1-ya is the nearest rural locality.
