= Lubianka =

Lubianka (Ukrainian: Луб'янка), rural localities and hydronyms in Poland and Ukraine, may refer to:

== Places ==
=== Poland ===
- Lubianka, Warmian-Masurian Voivodeship (north Poland)
- Lubianka, West Pomeranian Voivodeship (north-west Poland)

=== Ukraine ===
- Lubianka, Dnipropetrovsk Oblast, a village
- Lubianka, Bila Tserkva Raion, Kyiv Oblast, a village
- Lubianka, Bucha Raion, Kyiv Oblast, a village
- Lubianka, Vasylkiv Raion, Kyiv Oblast, a village
- Lubianka, Luhansk Oblast, a village
- Lubianka, Mykolaiv Oblast, a village

== Hydronyms ==
- Lubianka (lake) (north-west Poland)
- Lubianka (reservoir) (east-central Poland)
- Lubianka River (Świętokrzyskie Voivodeship) (east-central Poland)
- Lubianka River (Warmian-Masurian Voivodeship) (north-east Poland)

== See also ==
- Łubianka (disambiguation)
- Lubyanka (disambiguation)
