= Alexander Barybin =

Russian politician

Alexander Barybin (born in Oryol, Russian SFSR, Soviet Union) is a Ukrainian politician. He served as the acting Mayor of Melitopol from February 8, 2013, to June 7, 2013, as Secretary of the Melitopol City Council.

== Biography ==
Barybin moved to Melitopol in 1954. In 1968, he graduated from secondary school No. 25, entered the MIMSKH (now TGATU), he received his degree in mechanical engineering. In 1973–74. worked in Gulyai-Pole repair plant. In 1974 he returned to Melitopol and worked on the station "South", first master, then the senior master and chief engineer, and. o. director. From 1981 he worked at the engine plant manager, deputy head of the assembly shop, head of guarantee-maintenance, factory director of STR. In 1998 he opened his own car repair shop. In April 2006, headed the commission on land relations and the environment. June 7, 2013 at a meeting of city council members changed Melitopol Secretary. Instead Barybina Alexander, head of the city and the city council was Andrew Chappa. Also, from the hands of the deputy governor of Zaporizhzhya region Yuri Pelykh Alexander Barybin received the Order "For Services to the edge of Zaporozhye»
