= Nowe Grabie, Wołomin County =

Nowe Grabie
- Village
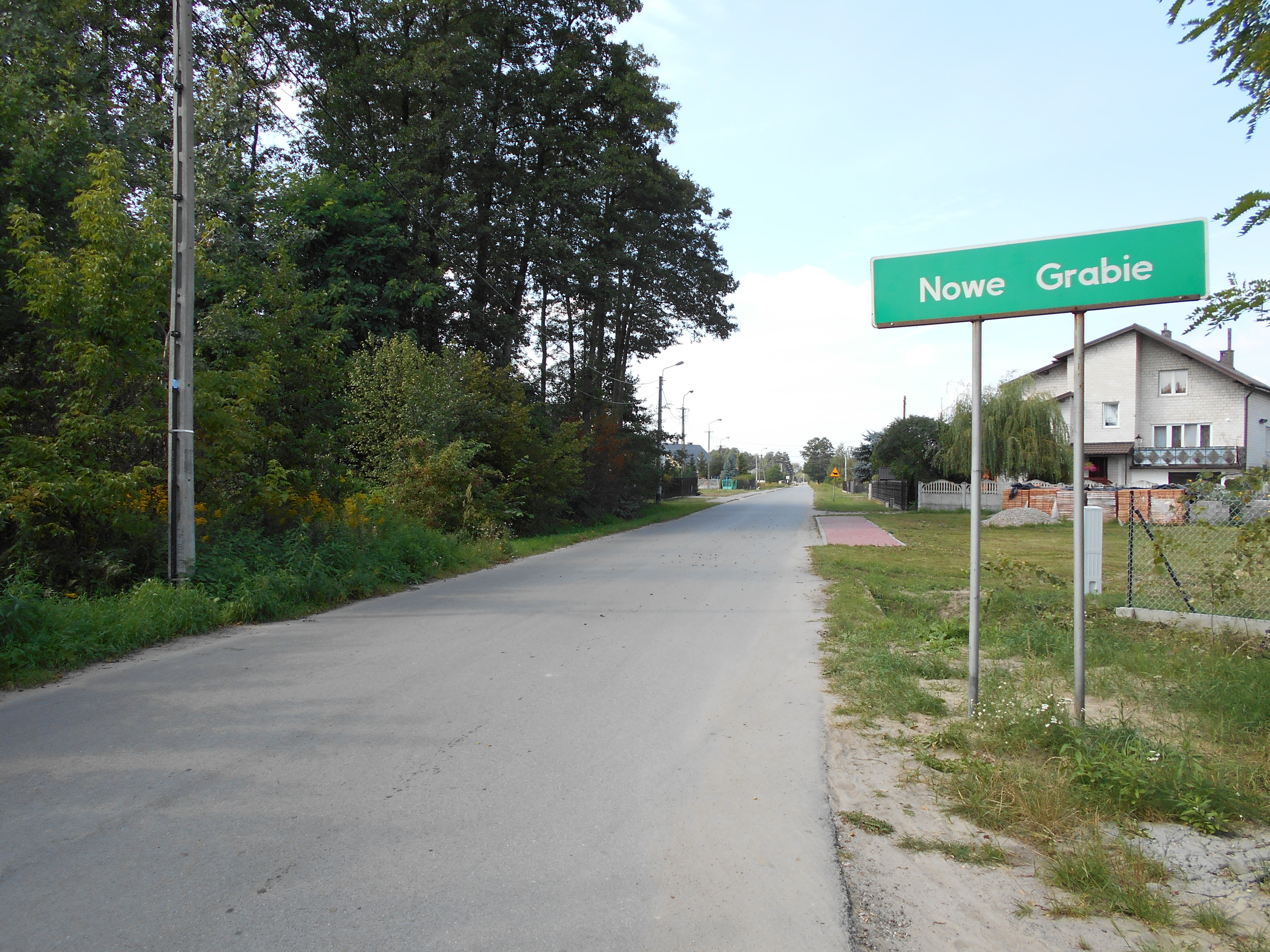

- Location within Poland
- Coordinates: 52°21′17″N 21°18′29″E
- Country: Poland
- Voivodeship: Masovian
- County: Wołomin
- Gmina: Wołomin

Nowe Grabie [ˈnɔvɛ ˈɡrabjɛ] is a village in the administrative district of Gmina Wołomin, within Wołomin County, Masovian Voivodeship, in east-central Poland.
