= Łubianka, Sokółka County =

Łubianka
- Village
- Location within Poland
- Coordinates: 53°23′48″N 23°13′38″E
- Country: Poland
- Voivodeship: Podlaskie
- County: Sokółka
- Gmina: Janów

Łubianka [wuˈbjaŋka] is a village in the administrative district of Gmina Janów, within Sokółka County, Podlaskie Voivodeship, in north-eastern Poland.
