= Janów, Podlaskie Voivodeship =

Janów
- Village
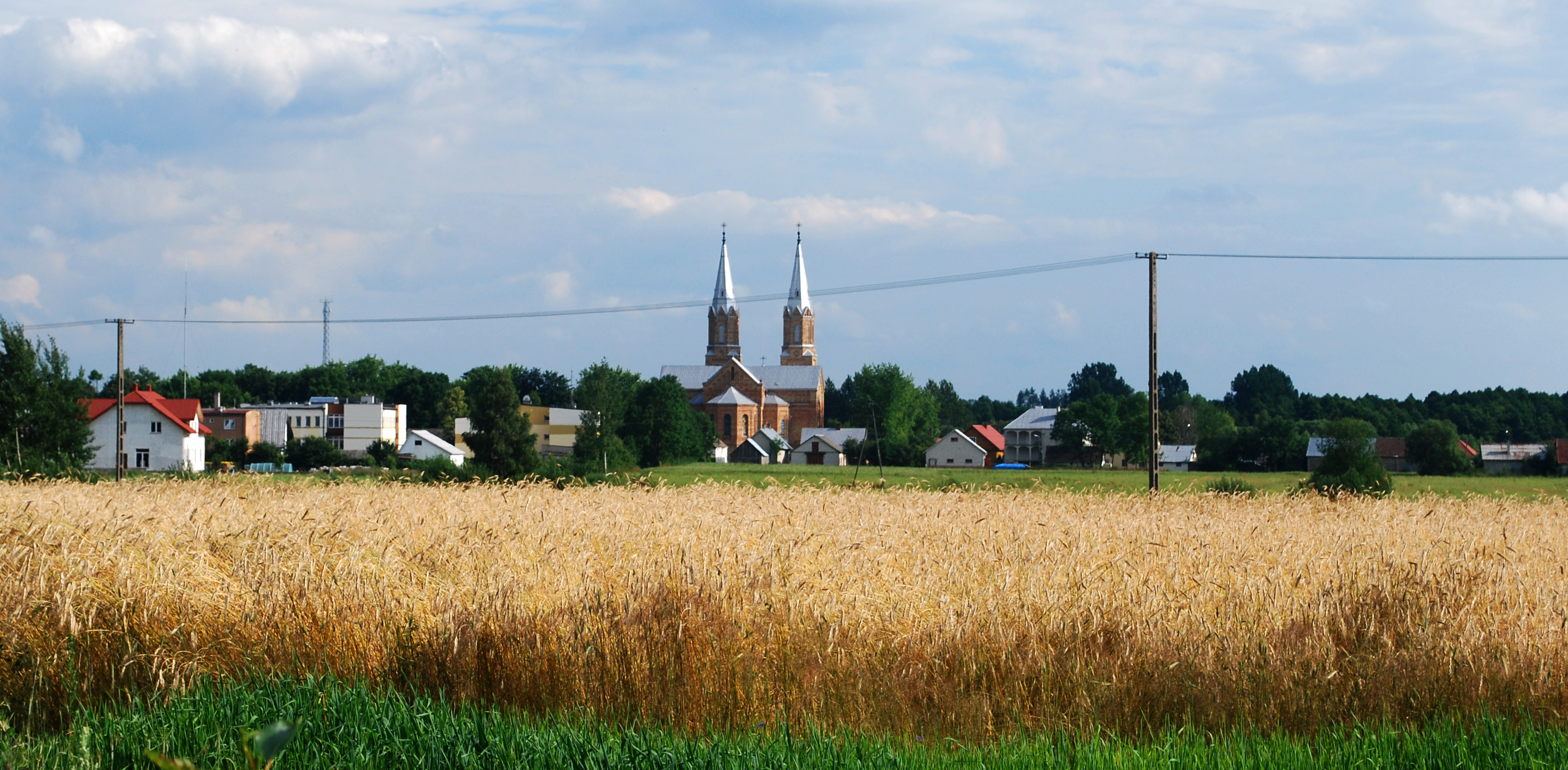
- General view

- Location within Poland
- Coordinates: 53°28′N 23°13′E
- Country: Poland
- Voivodeship: Podlaskie
- County: Sokółka
- Gmina: Janów

Janów [ˈjanuf] is a village in Sokółka County, Podlaskie Voivodeship, in north-eastern Poland. It is the seat of the gmina (administrative district) called Gmina Janów.
