= Lyubimovka, Medvensky District, Kursk Oblast =

Rural locality in Kursk Oblast, Russia

Lyubimovka Любимовка
- Khutor
- Interactive map of Lyubimovka
- Location of Lyubimovka Lyubimovka (Kursk Oblast)
- Coordinates: 51°32′04″N 36°26′39″E
- Country: Russia
- Federal subject: Kursk Oblast
- Administrative district: Medvensky District
- SelsovietSelsoviet: Kitayevsky

Population (2010 Census)
  - Total: 36
  - Estimate (2010): 36 (0%)

Municipal status
  - Municipal district: Medvensky Municipal District
  - Rural settlement: Kitayevsky Selsoviet Rural Settlement
- Time zone: UTC+3 (MSK)
- Postal code: 307051
- Dialing code: +7 47146
- OKTMO ID: 38624424121
- Website: kitayss.rkursk.ru

Lyubimovka (Russian: Любимовка) is a rural locality (a khutor) in Kitayevsky Selsoviet Rural Settlement, Medvensky District, Kursk Oblast, Russia. Population: 36 (2010 census); 48 (2002 census);

== Geography ==
The khutor is located on the Polnaya River (a left tributary of the Seym), 90 km (56 mi) from the Russia–Ukraine border, 27 km (17 mi) south-east of Kursk, 25 km (16 mi) north-east of the district center – the urban-type settlement Medvenka, 9 km (5.6 mi) from the selsoviet center – 2nd Kitayevka.

Climate

Lyubimovka has a warm-summer humid continental climate (Dfb in the Köppen climate classification).

== Transport ==
Lyubimovka is located 24 km (15 mi) from the federal route M-2 Crimea Highway (a part of the European route E105), 4 km (2.5 mi) from the road of intermunicipal significance 38H-236 (M2 "Crimea Highway" – Polevaya), 1.5 km (0.93 mi) from the road 38H-237 (M2 "Crimea Highway" – Polny – 38N-236), on the road 38H-248 (38N-237 – Shumovka with the access road to Lyubimovka), 9 km (5.6 mi) from the nearest railway station Polevaya (railway line Klyukva — Belgorod).

The rural locality is situated 26 km (16 mi) from Kursk Vostochny Airport, 98 km (61 mi) from Belgorod International Airport and 195 km (121 mi) from Voronezh Peter the Great Airport.
