= Shumovka, Kursk Oblast =

Rural locality in Kursk Oblast, Russia

Shumovka Шумовка
- Village
- Interactive map of Shumovka
- Location of Shumovka Shumovka (Kursk Oblast)
- Coordinates: 51°29′58″N 36°26′40″E
- Country: Russia
- Federal subject: Kursk Oblast
- Administrative district: Medvensky District
- SelsovietSelsoviet: Kitayevsky

Population (2010 Census)
  - Total: 6
  - Estimate (2010): 6 (0%)

Municipal status
  - Municipal district: Medvensky Municipal District
  - Rural settlement: Kitayevsky Selsoviet Rural Settlement
- Time zone: UTC+3 (MSK)
- Postal code: 307051
- Dialing code: +7 47146
- OKTMO ID: 38624424146
- Website: kitayss.rkursk.ru

Shumovka (Russian: Шумовка) is a rural locality (Russian: деревня, lit. 'village') in Kitayevsky Selsoviet Rural Settlement, Medvensky District, Kursk Oblast, Russia. Population: 6 (2010 census); 10 (2002 census);

== Geography ==
The village is located on the Dunayets Brook (a right tributary of the Polnaya in the basin of the Seym), 89 km (55 mi) from the Russia–Ukraine border, 30 km (19 mi) south-east of Kursk, 23 km (14 mi) north-east of the district center – the urban-type settlement Medvenka, 7.5 km (4.7 mi) from the selsoviet center – 2nd Kitayevka.

Climate

Shumovka has a warm-summer humid continental climate (Dfb in the Köppen climate classification).

== Transport ==
Shumovka is located 22.5 km (14.0 mi) from the federal route M-2 Crimea Highway (a part of the European route E105), 7 km (4.3 mi) from the road of intermunicipal significance 38H-236 (M2 "Crimea Highway" – Polevaya), 4 km (2.5 mi) from the road 38H-237 (M2 "Crimea Highway" – Polny – 38N-236), on the road 38H-248 (38N-237 – Shumovka with the access road to Lyubimovka), 12.5 km (7.8 mi) from the nearest railway halt 574 km (railway line Klyukva — Belgorod).

The rural locality is situated 30 km (19 mi) from Kursk Vostochny Airport, 94 km (58 mi) from Belgorod International Airport and 196 km (122 mi) from Voronezh Peter the Great Airport.
