= Muzalevka, Kursk Oblast =

Rural locality in Kursk Oblast, Russia

Muzalevka Музалевка
- Selo
- Interactive map of Muzalevka
- Location of Muzalevka Muzalevka (Kursk Oblast)
- Coordinates: 52°11′16″N 35°52′28″E
- Country: Russia
- Federal subject: Kursk Oblast
- Administrative district: Fatezhsky District
- SelsovietSelsoviet: Baninsky

Population (2010 Census)
  - Total: 46
  - Estimate (2010): 46 (0%)

Municipal status
  - Municipal district: Fatezhsky Municipal District
  - Rural settlement: Baninsky Selsoviet Rural Settlement
- Time zone: UTC+3 (MSK)
- Postal code: 307128
- Dialing code: +7 47144
- OKTMO ID: 38644402141
- Website: мобанинский.рф

Muzalevka (Russian: Музалевка) is a rural locality (Russian: село, lit. 'village') in Baninsky Selsoviet Rural Settlement, Fatezhsky District, Kursk Oblast, Russia. The population as of 2010 is 46.

== Geography ==
The village is located in the Rzhavets River basin (a tributary of the Krasavka River in the Svapa River basin), 107 km from the Russia–Ukraine border, 54 km north-west of Kursk, 9 km north-east of the district center – the town Fatezh, 6 km from the selsoviet center – Chermoshnoy.

=== Climate ===
Muzalevka has a warm-summer humid continental climate (Dfb in the Köppen climate classification).

== Transport ==
Muzalevka is located 2.5 km from the federal route M-2 Crimea Highway as part of the European route E105, 5.5 km from the road of regional importance 38K-002 (Verkhny Lyubazh – Ponyri), 1 km from the road of intermunicipal significance 38H-252 (M2 "Crimea Highway" – Sotnikovo), 27.5 km from the nearest railway station Vozy (railway line Oryol – Kursk).

The rural locality is situated 55 km from Kursk Vostochny Airport, 177 km from Belgorod International Airport and 234 km from Voronezh Peter the Great Airport.
