= Shchekatikhino =

Rural locality in Kursk Oblast, Russia

Shchekatikhino Щекатихино
- Khutor
- Interactive map of Shchekatikhino
- Location of Shchekatikhino Shchekatikhino (Kursk Oblast)
- Coordinates: 52°09′36″N 35°56′54″E
- Country: Russia
- Federal subject: Kursk Oblast
- Administrative district: Fatezhsky District
- SelsovietSelsoviet: Baninsky

Population (2010 Census)
  - Total: 5
  - Estimate (2010): 5 (0%)

Municipal status
  - Municipal district: Fatezhsky Municipal District
  - Rural settlement: Baninsky Selsoviet Rural Settlement
- Time zone: UTC+3 (MSK)
- Postal code: 307108
- Dialing code: +7 47144
- OKTMO ID: 38644402161
- Website: мобанинский.рф

Shchekatikhino (Russian: Щекатихино) is a rural locality (a khutor) in Baninsky Selsoviet Rural Settlement, Fatezhsky District, Kursk Oblast, Russia. Population: 5 (2010 census); 15 (2002 census);

== Geography ==
The khutor is located on the Gnilovodchik River (a link tributary of the Usozha in the basin of the Svapa), 112 km from the Russia–Ukraine border, 49 km north-west of Kursk, 9 km north-east of the district center – the town Fatezh, 7.5 km from the selsoviet center – Chermoshnoy.

Climate

Shchekatikhino has a warm-summer humid continental climate (Dfb in the Köppen climate classification).

== Transport ==
Shchekatikhino is located 7.5 km from the federal route M-2 Crimea Highway as part of the European route E105, 8 km from the road of regional importance 38K-002 (Verkhny Lyubazh – Ponyri), 0.5 km from the road of intermunicipal significance 38H-252 (M2 "Crimea Highway" – Sotnikovo), 22 km from the nearest railway station Vozy (railway line Oryol – Kursk).

The rural locality is situated 50 km from Kursk Vostochny Airport, 172 km from Belgorod International Airport and 228 km from Voronezh Peter the Great Airport.
