= Gorki, Russia =

Gorki is the name of several inhabited localities in Russia:

- Alternative spelling of Gorky, former name (during the Soviet Union, 1932-1990) of Nizhny Novgorod, currently the sixth-largest city in Russia
- Gorki Leninskiye, an urban-type settlement in Moscow Oblast, Russia
- Gorki-2, a settlement in Moscow Oblast, Russia
- Gorki-5, a village in Moscow Oblast, Russia
- Gorki-10, a settlement in Moscow Oblast, Russia
- Gorki Sukharyovskiye, a village in Moscow Oblast, Russia
- Gorki, name of about 160 rural localities in Russia, including:
  - Gorki, Baninsky selsovet, Fatezhsky District, Kursk Oblast, a selo
  - Gorki, Bolshezhirovsky selsovet, Fatezhsky District, Kursk Oblast, a khutor
  - Gorki, Soldatsky selsovet, Fatezhsky District, Kursk Oblast, a khutor
  - Gorki, Medvensky District, Kursk Oblast, a khutor.
