= Novaya Golovinka =

Rural locality in Kursk Oblast, Russia

Novaya Golovinka Новая Головинка
- Village
- Interactive map of Novaya Golovinka
- Location of Novaya Golovinka Novaya Golovinka (Kursk Oblast)
- Coordinates: 52°15′24″N 35°47′55″E
- Country: Russia
- Federal subject: Kursk Oblast
- Administrative district: Fatezhsky District
- SelsovietSelsoviet: Verkhnelyubazhsky

Population (2010 Census)
  - Total: 18
  - Estimate (2010): 18 (0%)

Municipal status
  - Municipal district: Fatezhsky Municipal District
  - Rural settlement: Verkhnelyubazhsky Selsoviet Rural Settlement
- Time zone: UTC+3 (MSK)
- Postal code: 307129
- Dialing code: +7 47144
- OKTMO ID: 38644416146
- Website: моверхнелюбажский.рф

Novaya Golovinka (Russian: Новая Головинка) is a rural locality (Russian: деревня, lit. 'village') in Verkhnelyubazhsky Selsoviet Rural Settlement, Fatezhsky District, Kursk Oblast, Russia. The population as of 2010 is 18.

== Geography ==
The village is located in the Yasenok River basin (a right tributary of the Svapa River), 106 km from the Russia–Ukraine border, 63 km north-west of Kursk, 18 km north-west of the district center – the town Fatezh, 4 km from the selsoviet center – Verkhny Lyubazh.

=== Climate ===
Novaya Golovinka has a warm-summer humid continental climate (Dfb in the Köppen climate classification).

== Transport ==
Novaya Golovinka is located 1.5 km from the federal route M-2 Crimea Highway (a part of the European route E105), 24.5 km from the route A-142 (a part of the European route E93), 2 km from the road of intermunicipal significance 38H-256 (M2 "Crimea Highway" – Yasenok), 25.5 km from the nearest railway station Kurbakinskaya (railway line Arbuzovo – Luzhki-Orlovskiye).

The rural locality is situated 65 km from Kursk Vostochny Airport, 186 km from Belgorod International Airport and 240 km from Voronezh Peter the Great Airport.
