= Staraya Golovinka =

Rural locality in Kursk Oblast, Russia

Staraya Golovinka Старая Головинка
- Village
- Interactive map of Staraya Golovinka
- Location of Staraya Golovinka Staraya Golovinka (Kursk Oblast)
- Coordinates: 52°16′28″N 35°45′48″E
- Country: Russia
- Federal subject: Kursk Oblast
- Administrative district: Fatezhsky District
- SelsovietSelsoviet: Verkhnelyubazhsky

Population (2010 Census)
  - Total: 46
  - Estimate (2010): 46 (0%)

Municipal status
  - Municipal district: Fatezhsky Municipal District
  - Rural settlement: Verkhnelyubazhsky Selsoviet Rural Settlement
- Time zone: UTC+3 (MSK)
- Postal code: 307129
- Dialing code: +7 47144
- OKTMO ID: 38644416166
- Website: моверхнелюбажский.рф

Staraya Golovinka (Russian: Старая Головинка) is a rural locality (Russian: деревня, lit. 'village') in Verkhnelyubazhsky Selsoviet Rural Settlement, Fatezhsky District, Kursk Oblast, Russia. Population: 46 (2010 census); 59 (2002 census);

== Geography ==
The village is located on the Svapa River (a right tributary of the Seym River), 105 km from the Russia–Ukraine border, 66 km north-west of Kursk, 21 km north-west of the district center – the town Fatezh, 7.5 km from the selsoviet center – Verkhny Lyubazh.

Climate

Staraya Golovinka has a warm-summer humid continental climate (Dfb in the Köppen climate classification).

== Transport ==
Staraya Golovinka is located 3.5 km from the federal route M-2 Crimea Highway (a part of the European route E105), 20 km from the route A-142 (a part of the European route E93), 1.5 km from the road of intermunicipal significance 38H-256 (M2 "Crimea Highway" – Yasenok), 22.5 km from the nearest railway station Kurbakinskaya (railway line Arbuzovo – Luzhki-Orlovskiye).

The rural locality is situated 68 km from Kursk Vostochny Airport, 188 km from Belgorod International Airport and 242 km from Voronezh Peter the Great Airport.
