= Khmelevoye, Kursk Oblast =

Rural locality in Kursk Oblast, Russia

Khmelevoye Хмелевое
- Selo
- Interactive map of Khmelevoye
- Location of Khmelevoye Khmelevoye (Kursk Oblast)
- Coordinates: 52°11′24″N 36°00′20″E
- Country: Russia
- Federal subject: Kursk Oblast
- Administrative district: Fatezhsky District
- SelsovietSelsoviet: Molotychevsky
- Elevation: 225 m (738 ft)

Population (2010 Census)
  - Total: 548
  - Estimate (2010): 548 (0%)

Municipal status
  - Municipal district: Fatezhsky Municipal District
  - Rural settlement: Molotychevsky Selsoviet Rural Settlement
- Time zone: UTC+3 (MSK)
- Postal code: 307125
- Dialing code: +7 47144
- OKTMO ID: 38644448106
- Website: момолотычевский.рф

Khmelevoye (Russian: Хмелевое) is a rural locality (Russian: село, lit. 'village') in Molotychevsky Selsoviet Rural Settlement, Fatezhsky District, Kursk Oblast, Russia. Population: 548 (2010 census); 801 (2002 census);

== Geography ==
The village is located on the Gnilovodchik Brook (a right tributary of the Usozha in the basin of the Svapa), 116 km from the Russia–Ukraine border, 49 km north-west of Kursk, 13 km north-east of the district center – the town Fatezh, 6 km from the selsoviet center – Molotychi.

Climate

Khmelevoye has a warm-summer humid continental climate (Dfb in the Köppen climate classification).

Climate data for Khmelevoye
Month	Jan	Feb	Mar	Apr	May	Jun	Jul	Aug	Sep	Oct	Nov	Dec	Year
Mean daily maximum °C (°F)	−4.6 (23.7)	−3.7 (25.3)	2 (36)	12.4 (54.3)	18.9 (66.0)	22.1 (71.8)	24.8 (76.6)	24 (75)	17.6 (63.7)	10 (50)	2.9 (37.2)	−1.6 (29.1)	10.4 (50.7)
Daily mean °C (°F)	−6.6 (20.1)	−6.2 (20.8)	−1.5 (29.3)	7.6 (45.7)	14.3 (57.7)	17.9 (64.2)	20.5 (68.9)	19.5 (67.1)	13.5 (56.3)	6.8 (44.2)	0.8 (33.4)	−3.5 (25.7)	6.9 (44.5)
Mean daily minimum °C (°F)	−9.1 (15.6)	−9.2 (15.4)	−5.5 (22.1)	2.2 (36.0)	8.7 (47.7)	12.6 (54.7)	15.5 (59.9)	14.5 (58.1)	9.4 (48.9)	3.6 (38.5)	−1.5 (29.3)	−5.7 (21.7)	3.0 (37.3)
Average precipitation mm (inches)	52 (2.0)	45 (1.8)	46 (1.8)	51 (2.0)	62 (2.4)	75 (3.0)	79 (3.1)	59 (2.3)	62 (2.4)	60 (2.4)	48 (1.9)	50 (2.0)	689 (27.1)
Source: https://en.climate-data.org/asia/russian-federation/kursk-oblast/khmelevoye-229293/

== Transport ==
Khmelevoye is located 11 km from the federal route M-2 Crimea Highway as part of the European route E105, 3 km from the road of regional importance 38K-002 (Verkhny Lyubazh – Ponyri), on the road of intermunicipal significance 38Н-039 (38K-002 – Khmelevoye), 17 km from the nearest railway station Vozy (railway line Oryol – Kursk).

The rural locality is situated 51 km from Kursk Vostochny Airport, 174 km from Belgorod International Airport and 224 km from Voronezh Peter the Great Airport.
