= Dvoriki, Fatezhsky District, Kursk Oblast =

Rural locality in Kursk Oblast, Russia

Dvoriki Дворики
- Village
- Interactive map of Dvoriki
- Location of Dvoriki Dvoriki (Kursk Oblast)
- Coordinates: 52°15′58″N 35°49′10″E
- Country: Russia
- Federal subject: Kursk Oblast
- Administrative district: Fatezhsky District
- SelsovietSelsoviet: Verkhnelyubazhsky

Population (2010 Census)
  - Total: 57
  - Estimate (2010): 57 (0%)

Municipal status
  - Municipal district: Fatezhsky Municipal District
  - Rural settlement: Verkhnelyubazhsky Selsoviet Rural Settlement
- Time zone: UTC+3 (MSK)
- Postal code: 307129
- Dialing code: +7 47144
- OKTMO ID: 38644416141
- Website: моверхнелюбажский.рф

Dvoriki (Russian: Дворики) is a rural locality (Russian: деревня, lit. 'village') in Verkhnelyubazhsky Selsoviet Rural Settlement, Fatezhsky District, Kursk Oblast, Russia. Population: 57 (2010 census); 58 (2002 census);

== Geography ==
The village is located on the Yasenok River (a right tributary of the Svapa River), 108 km from the Russia–Ukraine border, 64 km north-west of Kursk, 19 km north of the district center – the town Fatezh, 5 km from the selsoviet center – Verkhny Lyubazh.

Climate

Dvoriki has a warm-summer humid continental climate (Dfb in the Köppen climate classification).

== Transport ==
Dvoriki is located on the federal route M-2 Crimea Highway (a part of the European route E105), 22.5 km from the route A-142 (a part of the European route E93), 1 km from the road of intermunicipal significance 38H-256 (M2 "Crimea Highway" – Yasenok), 26 km from the nearest railway station Kurbakinskaya (railway line Arbuzovo – Luzhki-Orlovskiye).

The rural locality is situated 65 km from Kursk Vostochny Airport, 186 km from Belgorod International Airport and 238 km from Voronezh Peter the Great Airport.
