= Gorki, Baninsky selsovet, Fatezhsky District, Kursk Oblast =

Rural locality in Kursk Oblast, Russia

Gorki Горки
- Selo
- Interactive map of Gorki
- Location of Gorki Gorki (Kursk Oblast)
- Coordinates: 52°10′51″N 35°52′14″E
- Country: Russia
- Federal subject: Kursk Oblast
- Administrative district: Fatezhsky District
- SelsovietSelsoviet: Baninsky

Population (2010 Census)
  - Total: 75
  - Estimate (2010): 75 (0%)

Municipal status
  - Municipal district: Fatezhsky Municipal District
  - Rural settlement: Baninsky Selsoviet Rural Settlement
- Time zone: UTC+3 (MSK)
- Postal code: 307128
- Dialing code: +7 47144
- OKTMO ID: 38644402126
- Website: мобанинский.рф

Gorki (Russian: Горки) is a rural locality (Russian: село, lit. 'village') in Baninsky Selsoviet Rural Settlement, Fatezhsky District, Kursk Oblast, Russia. Population: 75 (2010 census); 114 (2002 census);

== Geography ==
The village is located on the Rzhavets River (a tributary of the Krasavka in the Svapa River basin), 107 km from the Russia–Ukraine border, 54 km north-west of Kursk, 8 km north of the district center – the town Fatezh, 2.5 km from the selsoviet center – Chermoshnoy.

Climate

Gorki has a warm-summer humid continental climate (Dfb in the Köppen climate classification).

== Transport ==
Gorki is located 2 km from the federal route M-2 Crimea Highway as part of the European route E105, 5 km from the road of regional importance 38K-002 (Verkhny Lyubazh – Ponyri), on the road of intermunicipal significance 38H-252 (M2 "Crimea Highway" – Sotnikovo), 28 km from the nearest railway station Vozy (railway line Oryol – Kursk).

The rural locality is situated 55 km from Kursk Vostochny Airport, 176 km from Belgorod International Airport and 234 km from Voronezh Peter the Great Airport.
