= Korenevka =

Korenevka (Russian: Кореневка), rural localities in Russia, may refer to:

- Korenevka, Fatezhsky District, Kursk Oblast, a khutor
- Korenevka, Medvensky District, Kursk Oblast, a village
- Korenevka, Tula Oblast, a village
