= Krasny May, Kursk Oblast =

Rural locality in Kursk Oblast, Russia

Krasny May Красный Май
- Khutor
- Interactive map of Krasny May
- Location of Krasny May Krasny May (Kursk Oblast)
- Coordinates: 51°20′46″N 35°54′50″E
- Country: Russia
- Federal subject: Kursk Oblast
- Administrative district: Medvensky District
- SelsovietSelsoviet: Vyshnereutchansky

Population (2010 Census)
  - Total: 2
  - Estimate (2010): 2 (0%)

Municipal status
  - Municipal district: Medvensky Municipal District
  - Rural settlement: Vyshnereutchansky Selsoviet Rural Settlement
- Time zone: UTC+3 (MSK)
- Postal code: 307046
- Dialing code: +7 47146
- OKTMO ID: 38624448136
- Website: vishereut.rkursk.ru

Krasny May (Russian: Красный Май) is a rural locality (a khutor) in Vyshnereutchansky Selsoviet Rural Settlement, Medvensky District, Kursk Oblast, Russia. Population: 2 (2010 census); 5 (2002 census);

== Geography ==
The khutor is located in the Lyubach River basin (a left tributary of the Reut River in the Seym basin), 49 km (30 mi) from the Russia–Ukraine border, 44 km (27 mi) south-west of Kursk, 15 km (9.3 mi) south-west of the district center – the urban-type settlement Medvenka, 5 km (3.1 mi) from the selsoviet center – Verkhny Reutets.

Climate

Krasny May has a warm-summer humid continental climate (Dfb in the Köppen climate classification).

== Transport ==
Krasny May is located 16.5 km (10.3 mi) from the federal route M-2 Crimea Highway (a part of the European route E105), 3 km (1.9 mi) from the road of intermunicipal significance 38H-185 (M2 "Crimea Highway" – Gakhovo), 2 km (1.2 mi) from the road 38H-192 (38N-185 – 1st Lipovets — border with Oboyansky District), 0.5 km (0.31 mi) from the road 38H-193 (38N-192 – Rozhnovka), 33 km (21 mi) from the nearest railway halt 439 km (railway line Lgov I — Kursk).

The rural locality is situated 52 km (32 mi) from Kursk Vostochny Airport, 90 km (56 mi) from Belgorod International Airport and 235 km (146 mi) from Voronezh Peter the Great Airport.
