= Kartashovka, Medvensky District, Kursk Oblast =

Rural locality in Kursk Oblast, Russia

Kartashovka Карташовка
- Khutor
- Interactive map of Kartashovka
- Location of Kartashovka Kartashovka (Kursk Oblast)
- Coordinates: 51°20′16″N 36°01′19″E
- Country: Russia
- Federal subject: Kursk Oblast
- Administrative district: Medvensky District
- SelsovietSelsoviet: Vyshnereutchansky

Population (2010 Census)
  - Total: 8
  - Estimate (2010): 8 (0%)

Municipal status
  - Municipal district: Medvensky Municipal District
  - Rural settlement: Vyshnereutchansky Selsoviet Rural Settlement
- Time zone: UTC+3 (MSK)
- Postal code: 307048
- Dialing code: +7 47146
- OKTMO ID: 38624416126
- Website: vishereut.rkursk.ru

Kartashovka (Russian: Карташовка) is a rural locality (a khutor) in Vyshnereutchansky Selsoviet Rural Settlement, Medvensky District, Kursk Oblast, Russia. Population: 8 (2010 census); 25 (2002 census);

== Geography ==
The khutor is located in the Reutets River basin (a left tributary of the Reut River in the Seym basin), 54 km (34 mi) from the Russia–Ukraine border, 42 km (26 mi) south-west of Kursk, 10 km (6.2 mi) south-west of the district center – the urban-type settlement Medvenka, at the еаstern border of the selsoviet center – Verkhny Reutets.

Climate

Kartashovka has a warm-summer humid continental climate (Dfb in the Köppen climate classification).

== Transport ==
Kartashovka is located 9.5 km (5.9 mi) from the federal route M-2 Crimea Highway (a part of the European route E105), 2.5 km (1.6 mi) from the road of intermunicipal significance 38H-185 (M2 "Crimea Highway" – Gakhovo), 1.5 km (0.93 mi) from the road 38H-188 (38N-185 – Verkhny Reutets – Reutchansky), 34.5 km (21.4 mi) from the nearest railway halt and passing loop 454 km (railway line Lgov I — Kursk).

The rural locality is situated 50 km (31 mi) from Kursk Vostochny Airport, 86 km (53 mi) from Belgorod International Airport and 228 km (142 mi) from Voronezh Peter the Great Airport.
