= Krasny May (disambiguation) =

Krasny May (Russian: Красный Май), rural localities in Russia, may refer to:

- Krasny May, Charyshsky District, Altai Krai, a selo
- Krasny May, Pavlovsky District, Altai Krai, a settlement
- Krasny May, Belgorod Oblast, a khutor
- Krasny May, Kursk Oblast, a khutor
- Krasny May, Mari El, a settlement
- Krasny May, Nizhny Novgorod Oblast, a village
- Krasny May, Ryazan Oblast, a settlement
- Krasny May, Kashinsky District, Tver Oblast, a settlement
- Krasny May, Udomelsky District, Tver Oblast, a settlement
