= Kurasy =

Rural locality in Kursk Oblast, Russia

Kurasy Курасы
- Khutor
- Interactive map of Kurasy
- Location of Kurasy Kurasy (Kursk Oblast)
- Coordinates: 51°22′57″N 35°52′33″E
- Country: Russia
- Federal subject: Kursk Oblast
- Administrative district: Medvensky District
- SelsovietSelsoviet: Vyshnereutchansky

Population (2010 Census)
  - Total: 16
  - Estimate (2010): 16 (0%)

Municipal status
  - Municipal district: Medvensky Municipal District
  - Rural settlement: Vyshnereutchansky Selsoviet Rural Settlement
- Time zone: UTC+3 (MSK)
- Postal code: 307046
- Dialing code: +7 47146
- OKTMO ID: 38624448141
- Website: vishereut.rkursk.ru

Kurasy (Russian: Курасы) is a rural locality (a khutor) in Vyshnereutchansky Selsoviet Rural Settlement, Medvensky District, Kursk Oblast, Russia. Population: 16 (2010 census); 33 (2002 census);

== Geography ==
The khutor is located on the Lyubach River (a left tributary of the Reut River in the Seym basin), 50 km (31 mi) from the Russia–Ukraine border, 41 km (25 mi) south-west of Kursk, 15.5 km (9.6 mi) south-west of the district center – the urban-type settlement Medvenka, 9 km (5.6 mi) from the selsoviet center – Verkhny Reutets.

Climate

Kurasy has a warm-summer humid continental climate (Dfb in the Köppen climate classification).

== Transport ==
Kurasy is located 18 km (11 mi) from the federal route M-2 Crimea Highway (a part of the European route E105), 1 km (0.62 mi) from the road of intermunicipal significance 38H-185 (M2 "Crimea Highway" – Gakhovo), 28.5 km (17.7 mi) from the nearest railway halt 439 km (railway line Lgov I — Kursk).

The rural locality is situated 50 km (31 mi) from Kursk Vostochny Airport, 95 km (59 mi) from Belgorod International Airport and 237 km (147 mi) from Voronezh Peter the Great Airport.
