= Lomovka =

Name of several rural localities in Russia

Lomovka (Russian: Ломовка) is the name of several rural localities in Russia:

- Lomovka, Republic of Bashkortostan, a selo in Lomovsky Selsoviet of Beloretsky District of the Republic of Bashkortostan
- Lomovka, Kursk Oblast, a khutor in Baninsky Selsoviet of Fatezhsky District of Kursk Oblast
- Lomovka (selo), Arzamassky District, Nizhny Novgorod Oblast, a selo in Lomovsky Selsoviet of Arzamassky District of Nizhny Novgorod Oblast
- Lomovka (settlement), Arzamassky District, Nizhny Novgorod Oblast, a settlement in Lomovsky Selsoviet of Arzamassky District of Nizhny Novgorod Oblast
- Lomovka, Kulebaksky District, Nizhny Novgorod Oblast, a selo in Teplovsky Selsoviet of Kulebaksky District of Nizhny Novgorod Oblast
- Lomovka, Penza Oblast, a selo in Lomovsky Selsoviet of Luninsky District of Penza Oblast
- Lomovka, Perm Krai, a settlement under the administrative jurisdiction of the city of krai significance of Lysva, Perm Krai
- Lomovka, Samara Oblast, a selo in Pestravsky District of Samara Oblast
- Lomovka, Saratov Oblast, a village in Atkarsky District of Saratov Oblast
- Lomovka, Tambov Oblast, a selo in Maryevsky Selsoviet of Inzhavinsky District of Tambov Oblast
- Lomovka, Republic of Tatarstan, a village in Verkhneuslonsky District of the Republic of Tatarstan
- Lomovka, Bogoroditsky District, Tula Oblast, a selo in Lomovsky Rural Okrug of Bogoroditsky District of Tula Oblast
- Lomovka, Shchyokinsky District, Tula Oblast, a village in Lazarevskaya Rural Administration of Shchyokinsky District of Tula Oblast
- Lomovka, Tver Oblast, a village in Spirovsky District of Tver Oblast
