= Zherdevo, Fatezhsky District, Kursk Oblast =

Rural locality in Kursk Oblast, Russia

Zherdevo Жердево
- Village
- Interactive map of Zherdevo
- Location of Zherdevo Zherdevo (Kursk Oblast)
- Coordinates: 52°11′58″N 35°53′33″E
- Country: Russia
- Federal subject: Kursk Oblast
- Administrative district: Fatezhsky District
- SelsovietSelsoviet: Baninsky

Population (2010 Census)
  - Total: 159
  - Estimate (2010): 159 (0%)

Municipal status
  - Municipal district: Fatezhsky Municipal District
  - Rural settlement: Baninsky Selsoviet Rural Settlement
- Time zone: UTC+3 (MSK)
- Postal code: 307128
- Dialing code: +7 47144
- OKTMO ID: 38644402136
- Website: мобанинский.рф

Zherdevo (Russian: Жердево) is a rural locality (Russian: деревня, lit. 'village') in Baninsky Selsoviet Rural Settlement, Fatezhsky District, Kursk Oblast, Russia. Population: 159 (2010 census); 224 (2002 census);

== Geography ==
The village is located in the Rzhavets River basin (a tributary of the Krasavka in the Svapa River basin), 110 km from the Russia–Ukraine border, 55 km north-west of Kursk, 11 km north-east of the district center – the town Fatezh, 8.5 km from the selsoviet center – Chermoshnoy.

Climate

Zherdevo has a warm-summer humid continental climate (Dfb in the Köppen climate classification).

== Transport ==
Zherdevo is located 4 km from the federal route M-2 Crimea Highway as part of the European route E105, 3.5 km from the road of regional importance 38K-002 (Verkhny Lyubazh – Ponyri), on the road of intermunicipal significance 38H-747 (M2 "Crimea Highway" – Zherdevo), 26 km from the nearest railway station Vozy (railway line Oryol – Kursk).

The rural locality is situated 56 km from Kursk Vostochny Airport, 178 km from Belgorod International Airport and 233 km from Voronezh Peter the Great Airport.
