= Rzhava, Fatezhsky District, Kursk Oblast =

Rural locality in Kursk Oblast, Russia

Rzhava Ржава
- Village
- Interactive map of Rzhava
- Location of Rzhava Rzhava (Kursk Oblast)
- Coordinates: 52°09′17″N 35°51′40″E
- Country: Russia
- Federal subject: Kursk Oblast
- Administrative district: Fatezhsky District
- SelsovietSelsoviet: Baninsky

Population (2010 Census)
  - Total: 400
  - Estimate (2010): 400 (0%)

Municipal status
  - Municipal district: Fatezhsky Municipal District
  - Rural settlement: Baninsky Selsoviet Rural Settlement
- Time zone: UTC+3 (MSK)
- Postal code: 307128
- Dialing code: +7 47144
- OKTMO ID: 38644402146
- Website: мобанинский.рф

Rzhava (Russian: Ржава) is a rural locality (Russian: деревня, lit. 'village') in Baninsky Selsoviet Rural Settlement, Fatezhsky District, Kursk Oblast, Russia. The population as of 2010 is 400.

== Geography ==
The village is located on the Rzhavets River (a tributary of the Krasavka in the Svapa River basin), 105 km from the Russia–Ukraine border, 51 km north-west of Kursk, 6 km north of the district center – the town Fatezh, 2 km from the selsoviet center – Chermoshnoy.

=== Climate ===
Rzhava has a warm-summer humid continental climate (Dfb in the Köppen climate classification).

Climate data for Rzhava
| Month | Jan | Feb | Mar | Apr | May | Jun | Jul | Aug | Sep | Oct | Nov | Dec | Year |
|---|---|---|---|---|---|---|---|---|---|---|---|---|---|
| Mean daily maximum °C (°F) | −4.5 (23.9) | −3.7 (25.3) | 2.1 (35.8) | 12.5 (54.5) | 18.9 (66.0) | 22.2 (72.0) | 24.9 (76.8) | 24.1 (75.4) | 17.7 (63.9) | 10.1 (50.2) | 2.9 (37.2) | −1.5 (29.3) | 10.5 (50.9) |
| Daily mean °C (°F) | −6.6 (20.1) | −6.1 (21.0) | −1.4 (29.5) | 7.7 (45.9) | 14.3 (57.7) | 18 (64) | 20.6 (69.1) | 19.6 (67.3) | 13.6 (56.5) | 6.9 (44.4) | 0.8 (33.4) | −3.4 (25.9) | 7.0 (44.6) |
| Mean daily minimum °C (°F) | −9.1 (15.6) | −9.1 (15.6) | −5.4 (22.3) | 2.2 (36.0) | 8.8 (47.8) | 12.6 (54.7) | 15.6 (60.1) | 14.5 (58.1) | 9.5 (49.1) | 3.7 (38.7) | −1.5 (29.3) | −5.6 (21.9) | 3.0 (37.4) |
| Average precipitation mm (inches) | 52 (2.0) | 45 (1.8) | 46 (1.8) | 51 (2.0) | 62 (2.4) | 75 (3.0) | 80 (3.1) | 59 (2.3) | 62 (2.4) | 60 (2.4) | 49 (1.9) | 50 (2.0) | 691 (27.1) |
Source: https://en.climate-data.org/asia/russian-federation/kursk-oblast/ржава-472679/

== Transport ==
Rzhava is located 1 km from the federal route M-2 Crimea Highway as part of the European route E105, 6 km from the road of regional importance 38K-038 (Fatezh – Dmitriyev), 1 km from the road of intermunicipal significance 38H-233 (M2 "Crimea Highway" – 1st Banino), on the road 38H-825 (38N-233 – Rzhava), 28 km from the nearest railway station Vozy (railway line Oryol – Kursk).

The rural locality is situated 52 km from Kursk Vostochny Airport, 174 km from Belgorod International Airport and 234 km from Voronezh Peter the Great Airport.
