= Golyevka =

Rural locality in Kursk Oblast, Russia

Golyevka Гольевка
- Village
- Interactive map of Golyevka
- Location of Golyevka Golyevka (Kursk Oblast)
- Coordinates: 51°23′10″N 35°51′42″E
- Country: Russia
- Federal subject: Kursk Oblast
- Administrative district: Medvensky District
- SelsovietSelsoviet: Vyshnereutchansky

Population (2010 Census)
  - Total: 7
  - Estimate (2010): 7 (0%)

Municipal status
  - Municipal district: Medvensky Municipal District
  - Rural settlement: Vyshnereutchansky Selsoviet Rural Settlement
- Time zone: UTC+3 (MSK)
- Postal code: 307045
- Dialing code: +7 47146
- OKTMO ID: 38624448116
- Website: vishereut.rkursk.ru

Golyevka (Russian: Гольевка) is a rural locality (Russian: деревня, lit. 'village') in Vyshnereutchansky Selsoviet Rural Settlement, Medvensky District, Kursk Oblast, Russia.

Population: 7 (2010 census); 16 (2002 census); about 50 (1981). In 2002, 94 % of all residents were Russians.

== Geography ==
The village is located on the Kholodny Brook (a left tributary of the Lyubach River in the Seym basin), 49.5 km (30.8 mi) from the Russia–Ukraine border, 41 km (25 mi) south-west of Kursk, 16.5 km (10.3 mi) south-west of the district center – the urban-type settlement Medvenka, 10.5 km (6.5 mi) from the selsoviet center – Verkhny Reutets.

Climate

Golyevka has a warm-summer humid continental climate (Dfb in the Köppen climate classification).

== Transport ==
Golyevka is located 18.5 km (11.5 mi) from the federal route M-2 Crimea Highway (a part of the European route E105), 2 km (1.2 mi) from the road of intermunicipal significance 38H-185 (M2 "Crimea Highway" – Gakhovo), 28 km (17 mi) from the nearest railway halt 439 km (railway line Lgov I — Kursk).

The rural locality is situated 50 km (31 mi) from Kursk Vostochny Airport, 96 km (60 mi) from Belgorod International Airport and 238 km (148 mi) from Voronezh Peter the Great Airport.
