= Petroselki =

Rural locality in Kursk Oblast, Russia

Petroselki Петроселки
- Village
- Interactive map of Petroselki
- Location of Petroselki Petroselki (Kursk Oblast)
- Coordinates: 52°16′30″N 35°53′32″E
- Country: Russia
- Federal subject: Kursk Oblast
- Administrative district: Fatezhsky District
- SelsovietSelsoviet: Verkhnelyubazhsky

Population (2010 Census)
  - Total: 26
  - Estimate (2010): 26 (0%)

Municipal status
  - Municipal district: Fatezhsky Municipal District
  - Rural settlement: Verkhnelyubazhsky Selsoviet Rural Settlement
- Time zone: UTC+3 (MSK)
- Postal code: 307123
- Dialing code: +7 47144
- OKTMO ID: 38644416156
- Website: моверхнелюбажский.рф

Petroselki (Russian: Петроселки) is a rural locality (Russian: деревня, lit. 'village') in Verkhnelyubazhsky Selsoviet Rural Settlement, Fatezhsky District, Kursk Oblast, Russia. The population as of 2010 is 26.

== Geography ==
The village is located in the Svapa River basin (a right tributary of the Seym River), 113 km from the Russia–Ukraine border, 62 km north-west of Kursk, 19.5 km north-east of the district center – the town Fatezh, 7.5 km from the selsoviet center – Verkhny Lyubazh.

=== Climate ===
Petroselki has a warm-summer humid continental climate (Dfb in the Köppen climate classification).

== Transport ==
Petroselki is located 5 km from the federal route M-2 Crimea Highway (a part of the European route E105), 4.5 km from the road of regional importance 38K-002 (Verkhny Lyubazh – Ponyri), on the road of intermunicipal significance 38H-232 (M2 "Crimea Highway" – Petroselki), 26 km from the nearest railway halt 487 km (railway line Oryol – Kursk).

The rural locality is situated 64 km from Kursk Vostochny Airport, 186 km from Belgorod International Airport and 234 km from Voronezh Peter the Great Airport.
