= Kofanovka =

Kofanovka (Russian: Кофановка), rural localities in Russia, may refer to:

- Kofanovka, Fatezhsky District, Kursk Oblast, a village
- Kofanovka, Medvensky District, Kursk Oblast, a khutor
