= Molotychi =

Rural locality in Kursk Oblast, Russia

Molotychi Молотычи
- Selo
- Interactive map of Molotychi
- Location of Molotychi Molotychi (Kursk Oblast)
- Coordinates: 52°15′04″N 35°57′27″E
- Country: Russia
- Federal subject: Kursk Oblast
- Administrative district: Fatezhsky District
- SelsovietSelsoviet: Molotychevsky
- Elevation: 211 m (692 ft)

Population (2010 Census)
  - Total: 442
  - Estimate (2010): 442 (0%)

Administrative status
  - Capital of: Molotychevsky Selsoviet

Municipal status
  - Municipal district: Fatezhsky Municipal District
  - Rural settlement: Molotychevsky Selsoviet Rural Settlement
  - Capital of: Molotychevsky Selsoviet Rural Settlement
- Time zone: UTC+3 (MSK)
- Postal code: 307124
- Dialing code: +7 47144
- OKTMO ID: 38644448101
- Website: момолотычевский.рф

Molotychi (Russian: Молотычи) is a rural locality (Russian: село, lit. 'village') and the administrative center of Molotychevsky Selsoviet Rural Settlement, Fatezhsky District, Kursk Oblast, Russia. The population as of 2010 is 442.

== Geography ==
The village is located on the Molotychi Brook (a left tributary of the Svapa River), 115 km from the Russia–Ukraine border, 58 km north-west of Kursk, 18 km north-east of the district center – the town Fatezh.

=== Climate ===
Molotychi has a warm-summer humid continental climate (Dfb in the Köppen climate classification).

Climate data for Molotychi
Month	Jan	Feb	Mar	Apr	May	Jun	Jul	Aug	Sep	Oct	Nov	Dec	Year
Mean daily maximum °C (°F)	−4.6 (23.7)	−3.8 (25.2)	1.9 (35.4)	12.3 (54.1)	18.9 (66.0)	22.1 (71.8)	24.8 (76.6)	24 (75)	17.5 (63.5)	10 (50)	2.9 (37.2)	−1.6 (29.1)	10.4 (50.6)
Daily mean °C (°F)	−6.7 (19.9)	−6.2 (20.8)	−1.5 (29.3)	7.6 (45.7)	14.2 (57.6)	17.9 (64.2)	20.5 (68.9)	19.4 (66.9)	13.5 (56.3)	6.8 (44.2)	0.7 (33.3)	−3.5 (25.7)	6.9 (44.4)
Mean daily minimum °C (°F)	−9.2 (15.4)	−9.3 (15.3)	−5.5 (22.1)	2.1 (35.8)	8.6 (47.5)	12.5 (54.5)	15.5 (59.9)	14.4 (57.9)	9.3 (48.7)	3.6 (38.5)	−1.5 (29.3)	−5.7 (21.7)	2.9 (37.2)
Average precipitation mm (inches)	52 (2.0)	45 (1.8)	46 (1.8)	51 (2.0)	62 (2.4)	75 (3.0)	79 (3.1)	59 (2.3)	62 (2.4)	60 (2.4)	48 (1.9)	50 (2.0)	689 (27.1)
Source: https://en.climate-data.org/asia/russian-federation/kursk-oblast/молотычи-660894/

== Transport ==
Molotychi is located 8 km from the federal route M-2 Crimea Highway as part of the European route E105, 1.5 km from the road of regional importance 38K-002 (Verkhny Lyubazh – Ponyri), on the road of intermunicipal significance 38Н-037 (38K-002 – Molotychi), 18.5 km from the nearest railway halt 474 km (railway line Oryol – Kursk).

The rural locality is situated 58 km from Kursk Vostochny Airport, 182 km from Belgorod International Airport and 228 km from Voronezh Peter the Great Airport.
