= Kofanovka, Medvensky District, Kursk Oblast =

Rural locality in Kursk Oblast, Russia

Kofanovka Кофановка
- Khutor
- Interactive map of Kofanovka
- Location of Kofanovka Kofanovka (Kursk Oblast)
- Coordinates: 51°23′33″N 35°52′32″E
- Country: Russia
- Federal subject: Kursk Oblast
- Administrative district: Medvensky District
- SelsovietSelsoviet: Vyshnereutchansky

Population (2010 Census)
  - Total: 29
  - Estimate (2010): 29 (0%)

Municipal status
  - Municipal district: Medvensky Municipal District
  - Rural settlement: Vyshnereutchansky Selsoviet Rural Settlement
- Time zone: UTC+3 (MSK)
- Postal code: 307044
- Dialing code: +7 47146
- OKTMO ID: 38624448131
- Website: vishereut.rkursk.ru

Kofanovka (Russian: Кофановка) is a rural locality (a khutor) in Vyshnereutchansky Selsoviet Rural Settlement, Medvensky District, Kursk Oblast, Russia. Population: 29 (2010 census); 52 (2002 census);

== Geography ==
The khutor is located on the Lyubach River (a left tributary of the Reut River in the Seym basin), 50 km (31 mi) from the Russia–Ukraine border, 40 km (25 mi) south-west of Kursk, 15 km (9.3 mi) south-west of the district center – the urban-type settlement Medvenka, 10 km (6.2 mi) from the selsoviet center – Verkhny Reutets.

Climate

Kofanovka has a warm-summer humid continental climate (Dfb in the Köppen climate classification).

== Transport ==
Kofanovka is located 17 km (11 mi) from the federal route M-2 Crimea Highway (a part of the European route E105), 2.5 km (1.6 mi) from the road of intermunicipal significance 38H-185 (M2 "Crimea Highway" – Gakhovo), 27.5 km (17.1 mi) from the nearest railway halt 439 km (railway line Lgov I — Kursk).

The rural locality is situated 49 km (30 mi) from Kursk Vostochny Airport, 96 km (60 mi) from Belgorod International Airport and 237 km (147 mi) from Voronezh Peter the Great Airport.
