= Lyubach =

Lyubach (Russian: Любач), rural localities in Belarus and Russia, may refer to:

- Lyubach, Minsk Oblast, a village
- Lyubach, Kursk Oblast, a settlement
- Lyubach, Novgorod Oblast, a village
