= Lomovka, Kursk Oblast =

Rural locality in Kursk Oblast, Russia

Lomovka Ломовка
- Khutor
- Interactive map of Lomovka
- Location of Lomovka Lomovka (Kursk Oblast)
- Coordinates: 52°09′37″N 35°54′12″E
- Country: Russia
- Federal subject: Kursk Oblast
- Administrative district: Fatezhsky District
- SelsovietSelsoviet: Baninsky

Population (2010 Census)
  - Total: 6
  - Estimate (2010): 6 (0%)

Municipal status
  - Municipal district: Fatezhsky Municipal District
  - Rural settlement: Baninsky Selsoviet Rural Settlement
- Time zone: UTC+3 (MSK)
- Postal code: 307109
- Dialing code: +7 47144
- OKTMO ID: 38644402111
- Website: мобанинский.рф

Lomovka (Russian: Ломовка) is a rural locality (a khutor) in Baninsky Selsoviet Rural Settlement, Fatezhsky District, Kursk Oblast, Russia. The population as of 2010 is 6.

== Geography ==
The khutor is located in the Gnilovodchik River basin (a link tributary of the Usozha in the basin of the Svapa), 109 km from the Russia–Ukraine border, 51 km north-west of Kursk, 7 km north-east of the district center – the town Fatezh, 5 km from the selsoviet center – Chermoshnoy.

=== Climate ===
Lomovka has a warm-summer humid continental climate (Dfb in the Köppen climate classification).

== Transport ==
Lomovka is located 4.5 km from the federal route M-2 Crimea Highway as part of the European route E105, 8 km from the road of regional importance 38K-038 (Fatezh – Dmitriyev), 1 km from the road of intermunicipal significance 38H-233 (M2 "Crimea Highway" – 1st Banino), 25.5 km from the nearest railway station Vozy (railway line Oryol – Kursk).

The rural locality is situated 52 km from Kursk Vostochny Airport, 173 km from Belgorod International Airport and 231 km from Voronezh Peter the Great Airport.
