= Kartashovka =

Kartashovka (Russian: Карташовка), rural localities in Russia, may refer to:

- Kartashovka, Cheremisinovsky District, Kursk Oblast, a village
- Kartashovka, Medvensky District, Kursk Oblast, a khutor
- Kartashovka, Shchigrovsky District, Kursk Oblast, a village
- Kartashovka, Lipetsk Oblast, a village
- Kartashovka, Oryol Oblast, a village
