= Lyubach, Kursk Oblast =

Rural locality in Kursk Oblast, Russia

Lyubach Любач
- Settlement
- Interactive map of Lyubach
- Location of Lyubach Lyubach (Kursk Oblast)
- Coordinates: 51°21′55″N 35°52′25″E
- Country: Russia
- Federal subject: Kursk Oblast
- Administrative district: Medvensky District
- SelsovietSelsoviet: Vyshnereutchansky

Population (2010 Census)
  - Total: 248
  - Estimate (2010): 248 (0%)

Municipal status
  - Municipal district: Medvensky Municipal District
  - Rural settlement: Vyshnereutchansky Selsoviet Rural Settlement
- Time zone: UTC+3 (MSK)
- Postal code: 307044
- Dialing code: +7 47146
- OKTMO ID: 38624448101
- Website: vishereut.rkursk.ru

Lyubach (Russian: Любач) is a rural locality (a settlement) in Vyshnereutchansky Selsoviet Rural Settlement, Medvensky District, Kursk Oblast, Russia. Population: 248 (2010 census); 289 (2002 census);

== Geography ==
The settlement is located 48 km (30 mi) from the Russia–Ukraine border, 43 km (27 mi) south-west of Kursk, 16 km (9.9 mi) south-west of the district center – the urban-type settlement Medvenka, 8 km (5.0 mi) from the selsoviet center – Verkhny Reutets.

Climate

Lyubach has a warm-summer humid continental climate (Dfb in the Köppen climate classification).

Climate data for Lyubach
| Month | Jan | Feb | Mar | Apr | May | Jun | Jul | Aug | Sep | Oct | Nov | Dec | Year |
|---|---|---|---|---|---|---|---|---|---|---|---|---|---|
| Mean daily maximum °C (°F) | −4 (25) | −2.9 (26.8) | 3 (37) | 13 (55) | 19.4 (66.9) | 22.7 (72.9) | 25.2 (77.4) | 24.7 (76.5) | 18.2 (64.8) | 10.6 (51.1) | 3.5 (38.3) | −1.1 (30.0) | 11.0 (51.8) |
| Daily mean °C (°F) | −6.1 (21.0) | −5.5 (22.1) | −0.6 (30.9) | 8.2 (46.8) | 14.7 (58.5) | 18.4 (65.1) | 20.9 (69.6) | 20 (68) | 14 (57) | 7.3 (45.1) | 1.2 (34.2) | −3.1 (26.4) | 7.5 (45.4) |
| Mean daily minimum °C (°F) | −8.5 (16.7) | −8.6 (16.5) | −4.6 (23.7) | 2.8 (37.0) | 9.1 (48.4) | 13 (55) | 15.8 (60.4) | 14.9 (58.8) | 9.7 (49.5) | 4 (39) | −1.1 (30.0) | −5.3 (22.5) | 3.4 (38.1) |
| Average precipitation mm (inches) | 51 (2.0) | 44 (1.7) | 49 (1.9) | 50 (2.0) | 63 (2.5) | 68 (2.7) | 73 (2.9) | 54 (2.1) | 56 (2.2) | 56 (2.2) | 47 (1.9) | 50 (2.0) | 661 (26.1) |
Source: https://en.climate-data.org/asia/russian-federation/kursk-oblast/любач-681739/

== Transport ==
Lyubach is located 19 km (12 mi) from the federal route M-2 Crimea Highway (a part of the European route E105), on the road of intermunicipal significance 38H-185 (M2 "Crimea Highway" – Gakhovo), 30.5 km (19.0 mi) from the nearest railway halt 439 km (railway line Lgov I — Kursk).

The rural locality is situated 52 km (32 mi) from Kursk Vostochny Airport, 93 km (58 mi) from Belgorod International Airport and 238 km (148 mi) from Voronezh Peter the Great Airport.
