= 1st Lipovets =

Rural locality in Kursk Oblast, Russia

1st Lipovets 1-й Липовец
- Selo
- Interactive map of 1st Lipovets
- Location of 1st Lipovets 1st Lipovets (Kursk Oblast)
- Coordinates: 51°20′08″N 35°53′32″E
- Country: Russia
- Federal subject: Kursk Oblast
- Administrative district: Medvensky District
- SelsovietSelsoviet: Vyshnereutchansky

Population (2010 Census)
  - Total: 178
  - Estimate (2010): 178 (0%)

Municipal status
  - Municipal district: Medvensky Municipal District
  - Rural settlement: Vyshnereutchansky Selsoviet Rural Settlement
- Time zone: UTC+3 (MSK)
- Postal code: 307046
- Dialing code: +7 47146
- OKTMO ID: 38624448146
- Website: vishereut.rkursk.ru

1st Lipovets or Pervy Lipovets (Russian: 1-й Липовец, Первый Липовец) is a rural locality (Russian: село, lit. 'village') in Vyshnereutchansky Selsoviet Rural Settlement, Medvensky District, Kursk Oblast, Russia. Population: 178 (2010 census); 251 (2002 census);

== Geography ==
The village is located on the Lyubach River (a left tributary of the Reut River in the Seym basin), 47 km (29 mi) from the Russia–Ukraine border, 45 km (28 mi) south-west of Kursk, 16 km (9.9 mi) south-west of the district center – the urban-type settlement Medvenka, 7 km (4.3 mi) from the selsoviet center – Verkhny Reutets.

Climate

1st Lipovets has a warm-summer humid continental climate (Dfb in the Köppen climate classification).

Climate data for 1st Lipovets
Month	Jan	Feb	Mar	Apr	May	Jun	Jul	Aug	Sep	Oct	Nov	Dec	Year
Mean daily maximum °C (°F)	−3.9 (25.0)	−2.8 (27.0)	3.2 (37.8)	13.1 (55.6)	19.4 (66.9)	22.8 (73.0)	25.3 (77.5)	24.7 (76.5)	18.3 (64.9)	10.7 (51.3)	3.5 (38.3)	−1.1 (30.0)	11.1 (52.0)
Daily mean °C (°F)	−6 (21)	−5.4 (22.3)	−0.5 (31.1)	8.3 (46.9)	14.8 (58.6)	18.4 (65.1)	20.9 (69.6)	20.1 (68.2)	14.1 (57.4)	7.3 (45.1)	1.3 (34.3)	−3 (27)	7.5 (45.6)
Mean daily minimum °C (°F)	−8.5 (16.7)	−8.6 (16.5)	−4.6 (23.7)	2.8 (37.0)	9.1 (48.4)	13.1 (55.6)	15.8 (60.4)	14.9 (58.8)	9.8 (49.6)	4 (39)	−1.1 (30.0)	−5.2 (22.6)	3.5 (38.2)
Average precipitation mm (inches)	51 (2.0)	44 (1.7)	48 (1.9)	50 (2.0)	63 (2.5)	69 (2.7)	73 (2.9)	53 (2.1)	56 (2.2)	56 (2.2)	47 (1.9)	50 (2.0)	660 (26.1)
Source: https://en.climate-data.org/asia/russian-federation/kursk-oblast/1-и-липовец-681738/

== Transport ==
1st Lipovets is located 18 km (11 mi) from the federal route M-2 Crimea Highway (a part of the European route E105), 4 km (2.5 mi) from the road of intermunicipal significance 38H-185 (M2 "Crimea Highway" – Gakhovo), on the road 38H-192 (38N-185 – 1st Lipovets — border with Oboyansky District), 33.5 km (20.8 mi) from the nearest railway halt 439 km (railway line Lgov I — Kursk).

The rural locality is situated 54 km (34 mi) from Kursk Vostochny Airport, 90 km (56 mi) from Belgorod International Airport and 237 km (147 mi) from Voronezh Peter the Great Airport.
