= Igino, Kursk Oblast =

Rural locality in Kursk Oblast, Russia

Igino Игино
- Selo
- Interactive map of Igino
- Location of Igino Igino (Kursk Oblast)
- Coordinates: 52°13′49″N 35°41′56″E
- Country: Russia
- Federal subject: Kursk Oblast
- Administrative district: Fatezhsky District
- SelsovietSelsoviet: Verkhnelyubazhsky
- Elevation: 189 m (620 ft)

Population (2010 Census)
  - Total: 119
  - Estimate (2010): 119 (0%)

Municipal status
  - Municipal district: Fatezhsky Municipal District
  - Rural settlement: Verkhnelyubazhsky Selsoviet Rural Settlement
- Time zone: UTC+3 (MSK)
- Postal code: 307122
- Dialing code: +7 47144
- OKTMO ID: 38644416116
- Website: моверхнелюбажский.рф

Igino (Russian: Игино) is a rural locality (Russian: село, lit. 'village') in Verkhnelyubazhsky Selsoviet Rural Settlement, Fatezhsky District, Kursk Oblast, Russia. Population: 119 (2010 census); 185 (2002 census);
