= Reutchansky =

Rural locality in Kursk Oblast, Russia

Reutchansky Реутчанский
- Settlement
- Interactive map of Reutchansky
- Location of Reutchansky Reutchansky (Kursk Oblast)
- Coordinates: 51°18′56″N 36°00′50″E
- Country: Russia
- Federal subject: Kursk Oblast
- Administrative district: Medvensky District
- SelsovietSelsoviet: Vyshnereutchansky

Population (2010 Census)
  - Total: 173
  - Estimate (2010): 173 (0%)

Municipal status
  - Municipal district: Medvensky Municipal District
  - Rural settlement: Vyshnereutchansky Selsoviet Rural Settlement
- Time zone: UTC+3 (MSK)
- Postal code: 307048
- Dialing code: +7 47146
- OKTMO ID: 38624416136
- Website: vishereut.rkursk.ru

Reutchansky (Russian: Реутчанский) is a rural locality (a settlement) in Vyshnereutchansky Selsoviet Rural Settlement, Medvensky District, Kursk Oblast, Russia. Population: 173 (2010 census); 218 (2002 census);

== Geography ==
The settlement is located 52 km (32 mi) from the Russia–Ukraine border, 45 km (28 mi) south-west of Kursk, 12.5 km (7.8 mi) south-west of the district center – the urban-type settlement Medvenka, 3 km (1.9 mi) from the selsoviet center – Verkhny Reutets.

Climate

Reutchansky has a warm-summer humid continental climate (Dfb in the Köppen climate classification).

== Transport ==
Reutchansky is located 10.5 km (6.5 mi) from the federal route M-2 Crimea Highway (a part of the European route E105), 4.5 km (2.8 mi) from the road of intermunicipal significance 38H-185 (M2 "Crimea Highway" – Gakhovo), on the road 38H-188 (38N-185 – Verkhny Reutets – Reutchansky), 37 km (23 mi) from the nearest railway halt and passing loop 454 km (railway line Lgov I — Kursk).

The rural locality is situated 52 km (32 mi) from Kursk Vostochny Airport, 83 km (52 mi) from Belgorod International Airport and 230 km (140 mi) from Voronezh Peter the Great Airport.
