= Gorki, Soldatsky selsovet, Fatezhsky District, Kursk Oblast =

Rural locality in Kursk Oblast, Russia

Gorki Горки
- Khutor
- Interactive map of Gorki
- Location of Gorki Gorki (Kursk Oblast)
- Coordinates: 51°59′17″N 35°44′50″E
- Country: Russia
- Federal subject: Kursk Oblast
- Administrative district: Fatezhsky District
- SelsovietSelsoviet: Soldatsky

Population (2010 Census)
  - Total: 3
  - Estimate (2010): 3 (0%)

Municipal status
  - Municipal district: Fatezhsky Municipal District
  - Rural settlement: Soldatsky Selsoviet Rural Settlement
- Time zone: UTC+3 (MSK)
- Postal code: 307111
- Dialing code: +7 47144
- OKTMO ID: 38644468176
- Website: мосолдатский.рф

Gorki (Russian: Горки) is a rural locality (a khutor) in Soldatsky Selsoviet Rural Settlement, Fatezhsky District, Kursk Oblast, Russia. Population: 3 (2010 census); 5 (2002 census); 23 (1989 Soviet census).

== Geography ==
The khutor is located on the Nikovets River (a right tributary of the Ruda in the basin of the Svapa), 94 km from the Russia–Ukraine border, 41 km north-west of Kursk, 13 km south-west of the district center – the town Fatezh, 9.5 km from the selsoviet center – Soldatskoye.

Climate

Gorki has a warm-summer humid continental climate (Dfb in the Köppen climate classification).

== Transport ==
Gorki is located 11 km from the federal route M-2 Crimea Highway as part of the European route E105, 12.5 km from the road of regional importance 38K-038 (Fatezh – Dmitriyev), 4 km from the road of intermunicipal significance 38Н-679 (38K-038 – Soldatskoye – Shuklino), 0.3 km from the road 38Н-680 (38N-679 – Alisovo), 32 km from the nearest railway halt 552 km (railway line Navlya – Lgov-Kiyevsky).

The rural locality is situated 45 km from Kursk Vostochny Airport, 159 km from Belgorod International Airport and 240 km from Voronezh Peter the Great Airport.
