= Yasenok, Kursk Oblast =

Rural locality in Kursk Oblast, Russia

Yasenok Ясенок
- Village
- Interactive map of Yasenok
- Location of Yasenok Yasenok (Kursk Oblast)
- Coordinates: 52°16′46″N 35°47′00″E
- Country: Russia
- Federal subject: Kursk Oblast
- Administrative district: Fatezhsky District
- SelsovietSelsoviet: Verkhnelyubazhsky

Population (2010 Census)
  - Total: 80
  - Estimate (2010): 80 (0%)

Municipal status
  - Municipal district: Fatezhsky Municipal District
  - Rural settlement: Verkhnelyubazhsky Selsoviet Rural Settlement
- Time zone: UTC+3 (MSK)
- Postal code: 307129
- Dialing code: +7 47144
- OKTMO ID: 38644416136
- Website: моверхнелюбажский.рф

Yasenok (Russian: Ясенок) is a rural locality (Russian: деревня, lit. 'village') in Verkhnelyubazhsky Selsoviet Rural Settlement, Fatezhsky District, Kursk Oblast, Russia. Population: 80 (2010 census); 158 (2002 census);

== Geography ==
The village is located on the Yasenok River (a right tributary of the Svapa River), 106 km from the Russia–Ukraine border, 66 km north-west of Kursk, 21 km north-west of the district center – the town Fatezh, 7 km from the selsoviet center – Verkhny Lyubazh.

Climate

Yasenok has a warm-summer humid continental climate (Dfb in the Köppen climate classification).

== Transport ==
Yasenok is located 1.5 km from the federal route M-2 Crimea Highway (a part of the European route E105), 20 km from the route A-142 (a part of the European route E93), on the road of intermunicipal significance 38H-256 (M2 "Crimea Highway" – Yasenok), 23 km from the nearest railway station Kurbakinskaya (railway line Arbuzovo – Luzhki-Orlovskiye).

The rural locality is situated 67.5 km from Kursk Vostochny Airport, 188 km from Belgorod International Airport and 241 km from Voronezh Peter the Great Airport.
