= Lomovka, Republic of Bashkortostan =

Lomovka Ломовка
- Village
- Location within Bashkortostan Location within Russia
- Coordinates: 53°55′15″N 58°22′6″E
- Country: Russia
- Region: Bashkortostan
- District: Beloretsky District

Population (2010)
  - Total: 2,620
- Time zone: UTC+5:00

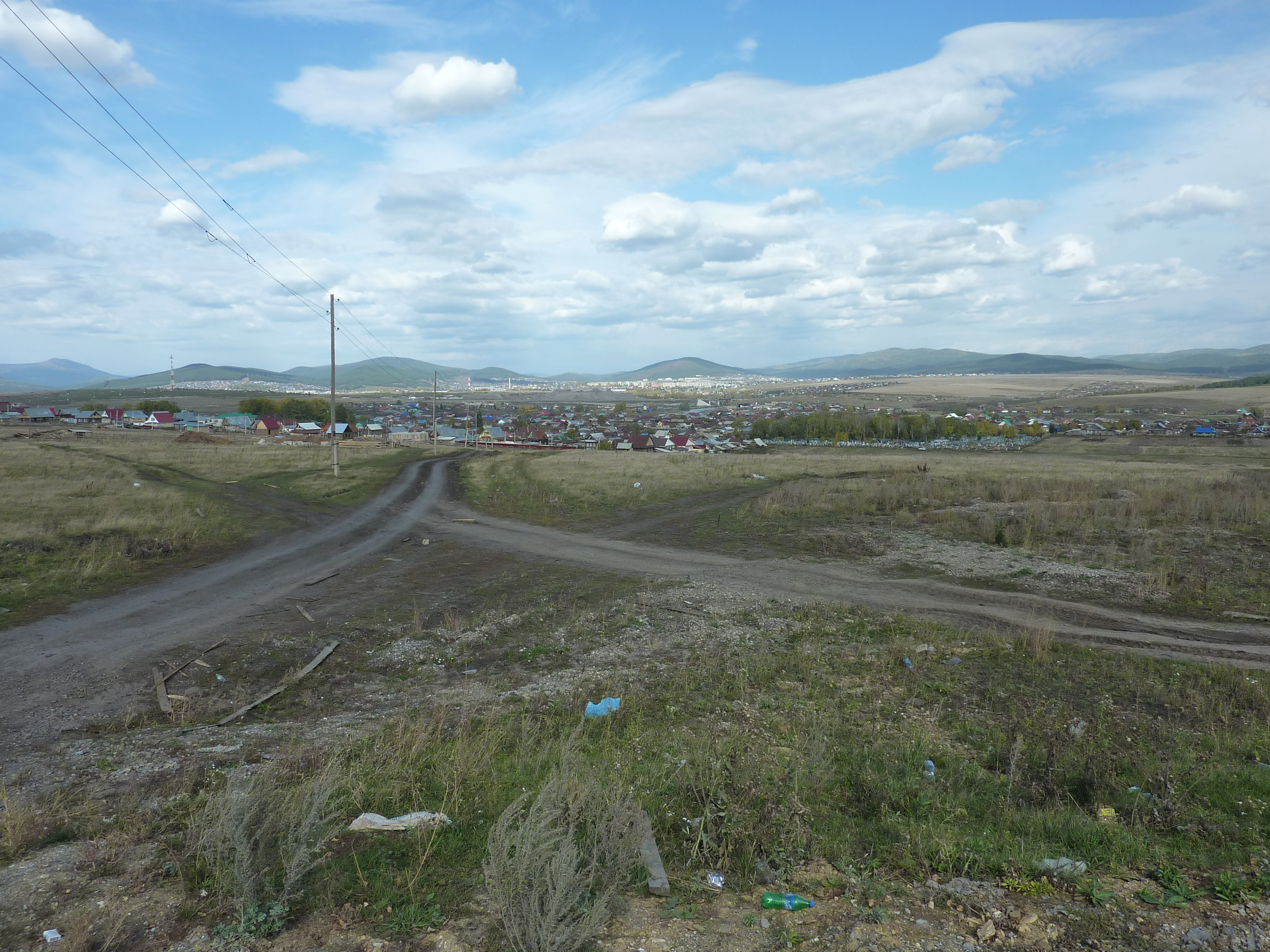

Lomovka (Russian: Ломовка) is a rural locality (a selo) in Lomovsky Selsoviet of Beloretsky District of the Republic of Bashkortostan, Russia. Population: 2,620 (2010 census); 3,172 (2002 census); 4,918 (1989 Soviet census).

== Geography ==
It is located 5 km from Beloretsk.
