= Korenevka, Fatezhsky District, Kursk Oblast =

Rural locality in Kursk Oblast, Russia

Korenevka Кореневка
- Khutor
- Interactive map of Korenevka
- Location of Korenevka Korenevka (Kursk Oblast)
- Coordinates: 51°55′00″N 35°45′15″E
- Country: Russia
- Federal subject: Kursk Oblast
- Administrative district: Fatezhsky District
- SelsovietSelsoviet: Bolshezhirovsky

Population (2010 Census)
  - Total: 32
  - Estimate (2010): 32 (0%)

Municipal status
  - Municipal district: Fatezhsky Municipal District
  - Rural settlement: Bolshezhirovsky Selsoviet Rural Settlement
- Time zone: UTC+3 (MSK)
- Postal code: 307113
- Dialing code: +7 47144
- OKTMO ID: 38644412196
- Website: мобольшежировский.рф

Korenevka (Russian: Кореневка) is a rural locality (a khutor) in Bolshezhirovsky Selsoviet Rural Settlement, Fatezhsky District, Kursk Oblast, Russia. Population: 32 (2010 census); 33 (2002 census);

== Geography ==
The khutor is located on the Gryaznaya Rudka Brook (a right tributary of the Ruda in the basin of the Svapa), 88 km from the Russia–Ukraine border, 36 km north-west of Kursk, 20 km south-west of the district center – the town Fatezh, 15.5 km from the selsoviet center – Bolshoye Zhirovo.

Climate

Korenevka has a warm-summer humid continental climate (Dfb in the Köppen climate classification).

== Transport ==
Korenevka is located 15 km from the federal route M-2 Crimea Highway as part of the European route E105, 28 km from the road of regional importance 38K-017 (Kursk – Lgov – Rylsk – border with Ukraine) as part of the European route E38, on the road of intermunicipal significance 38H-221 (M2 "Crimea Highway" – Kromskaya), 29.5 km from the nearest railway halt 433 km (railway line Lgov I — Kursk).

The rural locality is situated 40.5 km from Kursk Vostochny Airport, 151 km from Belgorod International Airport and 239 km from Voronezh Peter the Great Airport.
