= Krasny May =

Krasny May Красный Май
- Settlement
- Location within Altai Krai Location within Russia
- Coordinates: 53°20′N 83°06′E
- Country: Russia
- Region: Altai Krai
- District: Pavlovsky District
- Time zone: UTC+7:00

Krasny May (Russian: Красный Май) is a rural locality (a settlement) in Pavlozavodsky Selsoviet, Pavlovsky District, Altai Krai, Russia. The population was 219 as of 2013. There are 3 streets.

== Geography ==
Krasny May is located 13 km east of Pavlovsk (the district's administrative centre) by road. Sibirskiye Ogni and Chernopyatovo are the nearest rural localities.
