= Gorki, Bolshezhirovsky selsovet, Fatezhsky District, Kursk Oblast =

Rural locality in Kursk Oblast, Russia

Gorki Горки
- Khutor
- Interactive map of Gorki
- Location of Gorki Gorki (Kursk Oblast)
- Coordinates: 51°56′45″N 35°48′54″E
- Country: Russia
- Federal subject: Kursk Oblast
- Administrative district: Fatezhsky District
- SelsovietSelsoviet: Bolshezhirovsky

Population (2010 Census)
  - Total: 12
  - Estimate (2010): 12 (0%)

Municipal status
  - Municipal district: Fatezhsky Municipal District
  - Rural settlement: Bolshezhirovsky Selsoviet Rural Settlement
- Time zone: UTC+3 (MSK)
- Postal code: 307114
- Dialing code: +7 47144
- OKTMO ID: 38644412286
- Website: мобольшежировский.рф

Gorki (Russian: Горки) is a rural locality (a khutor) in Bolshezhirovsky Selsoviet Rural Settlement, Fatezhsky District, Kursk Oblast, Russia. Population: 12 (2010 census); 19 (2002 census);

== Geography ==
The khutor is located in the Nikovets Brook basin (a right tributary of the Ruda in the basin of the Svapa), 93 km from the Russia–Ukraine border, 35 km north-west of Kursk, 16 km south-west of the district center – the town Fatezh, 11 km from the selsoviet center – Bolshoye Zhirovo.

Climate

Gorki has a warm-summer humid continental climate (Dfb in the Köppen climate classification).

== Transport ==
Gorki is located 9.5 km from the federal route M-2 Crimea Highway as part of the European route E105, 17 km from the road of regional importance 38K-038 (Fatezh – Dmitriyev), 0.6 km from the road of intermunicipal significance 38H-221 (M2 "Crimea Highway" – Kromskaya), 33 km from the nearest railway halt 433 km (railway line Lgov I — Kursk).

The rural locality is situated 39 km from Kursk Vostochny Airport, 153 km from Belgorod International Airport and 235 km from Voronezh Peter the Great Airport.
