= 1st Banino =

Rural locality in Kursk Oblast, Russia

1st Banino 1-е Банино
- Selo
- Interactive map of 1st Banino
- Location of 1st Banino 1st Banino (Kursk Oblast)
- Coordinates: 52°08′10″N 35°55′41″E
- Country: Russia
- Federal subject: Kursk Oblast
- Administrative district: Fatezhsky District
- SelsovietSelsoviet: Baninsky
- Elevation: 213 m (699 ft)

Population (2010 Census)
  - Total: 164
  - Estimate (2010): 164 (0%)

Municipal status
  - Municipal district: Fatezhsky Municipal District
  - Rural settlement: Baninsky Selsoviet Rural Settlement
- Time zone: UTC+3 (MSK)
- Postal code: 307109
- Dialing code: +7 47144
- OKTMO ID: 38644402121
- Website: мобанинский.рф

1st Banino or Pervoye Banino (Russian: 1-е Банино, Первое Банино) is a rural locality (Russian: село, lit. 'village') in Baninsky Selsoviet Rural Settlement, Fatezhsky District, Kursk Oblast, Russia. Population: 164 (2010 census); 184 (2002 census);

== Geography ==
The village is located on the Gnilovodchik River (a link tributary of the Usozha in the basin of the Svapa), 109 km from the Russia–Ukraine border, 37 km north-west of Kursk, 4.5 km (15 km by road) north-east of the district center – the town Fatezh, 5 km from the selsoviet center – Chermoshnoy. There are no streets with titles.

Climate

1st Banino has a warm-summer humid continental climate (Dfb in the Köppen climate classification).

== Transport ==
1st Banino is located 6 km from the federal route M-2 Crimea Highway as part of the European route E105, 6.5 km from the road of regional importance 38K-038 (Fatezh – Dmitriyev), on the road of intermunicipal significance 38H-233 (M2 "Crimea Highway" – 1st Banino), 24.5 km from the nearest railway station Vozy (railway line Oryol – Kursk).

The rural locality is situated 47 km from Kursk Vostochny Airport, 170 km from Belgorod International Airport and 229 km from Voronezh Peter the Great Airport.
