= European route E93 =

Road in trans-European E-road network

E93

Location

Highway system
- International E-road network; A Class; B Class

European route E 93 is an obsolete route of the United Nations international E-road network. It was reclassified as the route E95.
