= Chermoshnoy, Fatezhsky District, Kursk Oblast =

Rural locality in Kursk Oblast, Russia

Chermoshnoy Чермошной
- Settlement
- Interactive map of Chermoshnoy
- Location of Chermoshnoy Chermoshnoy (Kursk Oblast)
- Coordinates: 52°07′46″N 35°50′53″E
- Country: Russia
- Federal subject: Kursk Oblast
- Administrative district: Fatezhsky District
- SelsovietSelsoviet: Baninsky

Population (2010 Census)
  - Total: 286
  - Estimate (2010): 286 (0%)

Administrative status
  - Capital of: Baninsky Selsoviet

Municipal status
  - Municipal district: Fatezhsky Municipal District
  - Rural settlement: Baninsky Selsoviet Rural Settlement
  - Capital of: Baninsky Selsoviet Rural Settlement
- Time zone: UTC+3 (MSK)
- Postal code: 307109
- Dialing code: +7 47144
- OKTMO ID: 38644402101
- Website: мобанинский.рф

Chermoshnoy (Russian: Чермошной) is a rural locality (a settlement) and the administrative center of Baninsky Selsoviet Rural Settlement, Fatezhsky District, Kursk Oblast, Russia. Population: 286 (2010 census); 309 (2002 census);

== Geography ==
The settlement is located in the Usozha River basin (a left tributary of the Svapa in the basin of the Seym), 104 km from the Russia–Ukraine border, 49 km north-west of Kursk, 4 km north of the district center – the town Fatezh.

Climate

Chermoshnoy has a warm-summer humid continental climate (Dfb in the Köppen climate classification).

== Transport ==
Chermoshnoy is located on the federal route M-2 Crimea Highway as part of the European route E105, 3 km from the road of regional importance 38K-038 (Fatezh – Dmitriyev), on the road of intermunicipal significance 38H-233 (M2 "Crimea Highway" – 1st Banino), 30 km from the nearest railway station Vozy (railway line Oryol – Kursk).

The rural locality is situated 51 km from Kursk Vostochny Airport, 170 km from Belgorod International Airport and 235 km from Voronezh Peter the Great Airport.
