= Verkhny Lyubazh =

Rural locality in Kursk Oblast, Russia

Verkhny Lyubazh Верхний Любаж
- Selo
- Interactive map of Verkhny Lyubazh
- Location of Verkhny Lyubazh Verkhny Lyubazh (Kursk Oblast)
- Coordinates: 52°12′58″N 35°50′03″E
- Country: Russia
- Federal subject: Kursk Oblast
- Administrative district: Fatezhsky District
- SelsovietSelsoviet: Verkhnelyubazhsky
- Elevation: 199 m (653 ft)

Population (2010 Census)
  - Total: 1,674
  - Estimate (2010): 1,674 (0%)

Administrative status
  - Capital of: Verkhnelyubazhsky Selsoviet

Municipal status
  - Municipal district: Fatezhsky Municipal District
  - Rural settlement: Verkhnelyubazhsky Selsoviet Rural Settlement
  - Capital of: Verkhnelyubazhsky Selsoviet Rural Settlement
- Time zone: UTC+3 (MSK)
- Postal code: 307120
- Dialing code: +7 47144
- OKTMO ID: 38644416101
- Website: моверхнелюбажский.рф

Verkhny Lyubazh (Russian: Верхний Любаж) is a rural locality (Russian: село, lit. 'village') and the administrative center of Verkhnelyubazhsky Selsoviet Rural Settlement, Fatezhsky District, Kursk Oblast, Russia. Population: 1,674 (2010 census); 1,925 (2002 census);

== Geography ==
The village is located on the Lyubazh River (a right tributary of the Zhelen in the basin of the Svapa), 107 km from the Russia–Ukraine border, 58 km north-west of Kursk, 13.5 km north of the district center – the town Fatezh.

Climate

Verkhny Lyubazh has a warm-summer humid continental climate (Dfb in the Köppen climate classification).

Climate data for Verkhny Lyubazh
Month	Jan	Feb	Mar	Apr	May	Jun	Jul	Aug	Sep	Oct	Nov	Dec	Year
Mean daily maximum °C (°F)	−4.5 (23.9)	−3.6 (25.5)	2.2 (36.0)	12.5 (54.5)	19 (66)	22.2 (72.0)	24.9 (76.8)	24.1 (75.4)	17.7 (63.9)	10.1 (50.2)	3 (37)	−1.5 (29.3)	10.5 (50.9)
Daily mean °C (°F)	−6.5 (20.3)	−6 (21)	−1.3 (29.7)	7.8 (46.0)	14.4 (57.9)	18 (64)	20.6 (69.1)	19.6 (67.3)	13.7 (56.7)	6.9 (44.4)	0.8 (33.4)	−3.4 (25.9)	7.1 (44.6)
Mean daily minimum °C (°F)	−9 (16)	−9 (16)	−5.3 (22.5)	2.4 (36.3)	8.8 (47.8)	12.7 (54.9)	15.6 (60.1)	14.6 (58.3)	9.5 (49.1)	3.8 (38.8)	−1.4 (29.5)	−5.6 (21.9)	3.1 (37.6)
Average precipitation mm (inches)	52 (2.0)	45 (1.8)	46 (1.8)	51 (2.0)	62 (2.4)	75 (3.0)	80 (3.1)	59 (2.3)	62 (2.4)	60 (2.4)	49 (1.9)	50 (2.0)	691 (27.1)
Source: https://en.climate-data.org/asia/russian-federation/kursk-oblast/verkhniy-lyubazh-229289/

== Transport ==
Verkhny Lyubazh is located on the federal route M-2 Crimea Highway as part of the European route E105, 28 km from the route A-142 (Trosna – M3 highway), 93 km from the route M-3 Ukraine Highway as part of the European route E101, 1.5 km from the road of regional importance 38K-002 (Verkhny Lyubazh – Ponyri), 12.5 km from the road 38K-038 (Fatezh – Dmitriyev), 26 km from the road 38K-035 (A-142 – 38K-038), 1.5 km from the road 38K-011 (M2 Crimea Highway – Igino – 38K-035), 1.5 km from the road of intermunicipal significance 38H-747 (M2 "Crimea Highway" – Zherdevo), 27 km from the nearest railway halt 34 km (railway line Arbuzovo – Luzhki-Orlovskiye).

The rural locality is situated 60 km from Kursk Vostochny Airport, 181 km from Belgorod International Airport and 237 km from Voronezh Peter the Great Airport.
