= Verkhny Reutets =

Rural locality in Kursk Oblast, Russia

Verkhny Reutets Верхний Реутец
- Selo
- Interactive map of Verkhny Reutets
- Location of Verkhny Reutets Verkhny Reutets (Kursk Oblast)
- Coordinates: 51°20′51″N 36°00′13″E
- Country: Russia
- Federal subject: Kursk Oblast
- Administrative district: Medvensky District
- SelsovietSelsoviet: Vyshnereutchansky

Population (2010 Census)
  - Total: 669
  - Estimate (2010): 669 (0%)

Administrative status
  - Capital of: Vyshnereutchansky Selsoviet

Municipal status
  - Municipal district: Medvensky Municipal District
  - Rural settlement: Vyshnereutchansky Selsoviet Rural Settlement
  - Capital of: Vyshnereutchansky Selsoviet Rural Settlement
- Time zone: UTC+3 (MSK)
- Postal code: 307048
- Dialing code: +7 47146
- OKTMO ID: 38624416101
- Website: vishereut.rkursk.ru

Verkhny Reutets (Russian: Верхний Реутец) is a rural locality (Russian: село, lit. 'village') and the administrative center of Vyshnereutchansky Selsoviet Rural Settlement, Medvensky District, Kursk Oblast, Russia. Population: 669 (2010 census); 886 (2002 census);

== Geography ==
The village is located on the Reutets River (a left tributary of the Reut River in the Seym basin), 54 km (34 mi) from the Russia–Ukraine border, 42 km (26 mi) south-west of Kursk, 9 km (5.6 mi) south-west of the district center – the urban-type settlement Medvenka.

Streets

There are the following streets in the locality: Babinka, Beloborodovka, Bolshoye, Bugor, Domiki, Gavrilovka, Grunt, Istomovka, Klyuchik, Lebedinovka, Lomanovka, Magazinnaya, Mordashovka, Nizhnevka, Podturshchina, Ragozevka, Voronovka and Zalozhenka (415 houses).

Climate

Verkhny Reutets has a warm-summer humid continental climate (Dfb in the Köppen climate classification).

Climate data for Verkhny Reutets
| Month | Jan | Feb | Mar | Apr | May | Jun | Jul | Aug | Sep | Oct | Nov | Dec | Year |
|---|---|---|---|---|---|---|---|---|---|---|---|---|---|
| Mean daily maximum °C (°F) | −4 (25) | −2.9 (26.8) | 3.1 (37.6) | 13.1 (55.6) | 19.5 (67.1) | 22.8 (73.0) | 25.4 (77.7) | 24.8 (76.6) | 18.3 (64.9) | 10.7 (51.3) | 3.5 (38.3) | −1.1 (30.0) | 11.1 (52.0) |
| Daily mean °C (°F) | −6.1 (21.0) | −5.5 (22.1) | −0.5 (31.1) | 8.3 (46.9) | 14.8 (58.6) | 18.5 (65.3) | 21 (70) | 20.1 (68.2) | 14.1 (57.4) | 7.3 (45.1) | 1.2 (34.2) | −3.1 (26.4) | 7.5 (45.5) |
| Mean daily minimum °C (°F) | −8.6 (16.5) | −8.6 (16.5) | −4.6 (23.7) | 2.8 (37.0) | 9.1 (48.4) | 13.1 (55.6) | 15.9 (60.6) | 15 (59) | 9.8 (49.6) | 4 (39) | −1.1 (30.0) | −5.3 (22.5) | 3.5 (38.2) |
| Average precipitation mm (inches) | 51 (2.0) | 44 (1.7) | 48 (1.9) | 50 (2.0) | 63 (2.5) | 69 (2.7) | 73 (2.9) | 53 (2.1) | 56 (2.2) | 56 (2.2) | 47 (1.9) | 50 (2.0) | 660 (26.1) |
Source: https://en.climate-data.org/asia/russian-federation/kursk-oblast/verkhniy-reutets-229481/

== Transport ==
Verkhny Reutets is located 9.5 km (5.9 mi) from the federal route M-2 Crimea Highway (a part of the European route E105), on the roads of intermunicipal significance 38H-185 (M2 "Crimea Highway" – Gakhovo) and 38H-188 (38N-185 – Verkhny Reutets – Reutchansky), 33.5 km (20.8 mi) from the nearest railway halt and passing loop 454 km (railway line Lgov I — Kursk).

The rural locality is situated 49 km (30 mi) from Kursk Vostochny Airport, 87 km (54 mi) from Belgorod International Airport and 229 km (142 mi) from Voronezh Peter the Great Airport.
