= Gakhovo =

Rural locality in Kursk Oblast, Russia

Gakhovo Гахово
- Selo
- Interactive map of Gakhovo
- Location of Gakhovo Gakhovo (Kursk Oblast)
- Coordinates: 51°21′42″N 35°50′16″E
- Country: Russia
- Federal subject: Kursk Oblast
- Administrative district: Medvensky District
- SelsovietSelsoviet: Vyshnereutchansky

Population (2010 Census)
  - Total: 212
  - Estimate (2010): 212 (0%)

Municipal status
  - Municipal district: Medvensky Municipal District
  - Rural settlement: Vyshnereutchansky Selsoviet Rural Settlement
- Time zone: UTC+3 (MSK)
- Postal code: 307044
- Dialing code: +7 47146
- OKTMO ID: 38624448111
- Website: vishereut.rkursk.ru

Gakhovo (Russian: Гахово) is a rural locality (Russian: село, lit. 'village') in Vyshnereutchansky Selsoviet Rural Settlement, Medvensky District, Kursk Oblast, Russia. Population: 212 (2010 census); 298 (2002 census);

== Geography ==
The village is located on the Gakhov Kolodez River (a left tributary of the Lyubach River in the Seym basin), 46 km (29 mi) from the Russia–Ukraine border, 45 km (28 mi) south-west of Kursk, 19 km (12 mi) south-west of the district center – the urban-type settlement Medvenka, 11 km (6.8 mi) from the selsoviet center – Verkhny Reutets.

Climate

Gakhovo has a warm-summer humid continental climate (Dfb in the Köppen climate classification).

Climate data for Gakhovo
Month	Jan	Feb	Mar	Apr	May	Jun	Jul	Aug	Sep	Oct	Nov	Dec	Year
Mean daily maximum °C (°F)	−4 (25)	−2.9 (26.8)	3.1 (37.6)	13 (55)	19.4 (66.9)	22.7 (72.9)	25.2 (77.4)	24.6 (76.3)	18.2 (64.8)	10.6 (51.1)	3.5 (38.3)	−1.1 (30.0)	11.0 (51.8)
Daily mean °C (°F)	−6 (21)	−5.4 (22.3)	−0.5 (31.1)	8.3 (46.9)	14.8 (58.6)	18.4 (65.1)	20.9 (69.6)	20 (68)	14 (57)	7.3 (45.1)	1.3 (34.3)	−3 (27)	7.5 (45.5)
Mean daily minimum °C (°F)	−8.5 (16.7)	−8.5 (16.7)	−4.6 (23.7)	2.8 (37.0)	9.2 (48.6)	13.1 (55.6)	15.8 (60.4)	14.9 (58.8)	9.8 (49.6)	4 (39)	−1 (30)	−5.2 (22.6)	3.5 (38.2)
Average precipitation mm (inches)	51 (2.0)	44 (1.7)	49 (1.9)	50 (2.0)	63 (2.5)	68 (2.7)	73 (2.9)	54 (2.1)	56 (2.2)	56 (2.2)	47 (1.9)	50 (2.0)	661 (26.1)
Source: https://en.climate-data.org/asia/russian-federation/kursk-oblast/гахово-681736/

== Transport ==
Gakhovo is located 22 km (14 mi) from the federal route M-2 Crimea Highway (a part of the European route E105), on the road of intermunicipal significance 38H-185 (M2 "Crimea Highway" – Gakhovo), 31 km (19 mi) from the nearest railway halt 439 km (railway line Lgov I — Kursk).

The rural locality is situated 54 km (34 mi) from Kursk Vostochny Airport, 94 km (58 mi) from Belgorod International Airport and 240 km (150 mi) from Voronezh Peter the Great Airport.
